= 1900 United States House of Representatives elections =

House elections for the 57th U.S. Congress

- June 4, September 4, September 10, and November 6, 1900 (Note: Regulars only, not including specials)

All 357 seats in the United States House of Representatives 179 seats needed for a majority
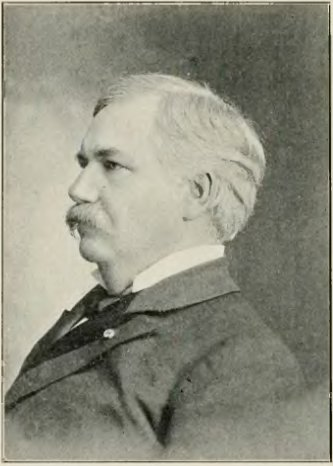

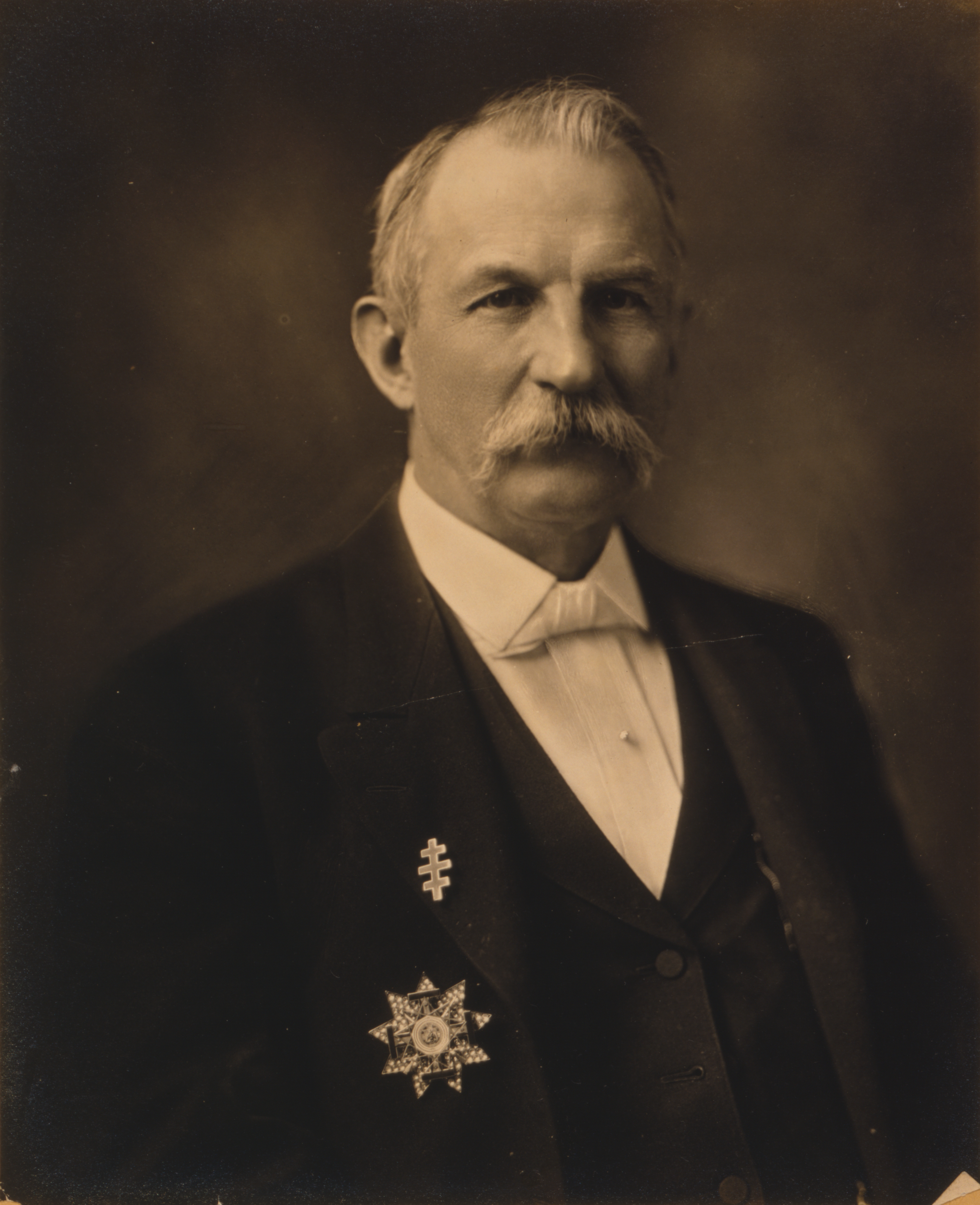
	Majority party	Minority party
Leader	David Henderson	James Richardson
Party	Republican	Democratic
Leader since	March 4, 1899	March 4, 1899
Leader's seat	Iowa 3rd	Tennessee 5th
Last election	187 seats	161 seats
Seats won	200	151
Seat change	▲13	▼10
Popular vote	6,929,305	6,081,813
Percentage	50.65%	44.45%
Swing	▲2.10pp	▲0.27pp
	Third party	Fourth party
Party	Populist	Silver Republican
Last election	5 seats	2
Seats won	5	1
Seat change	Steady	▼1
Popular vote	321,908	54,591
Percentage	2.35%	0.40%
Swing	▼1.89pp	▼0.16pp
	Fifth party
Party	Independent
Last election	1
Seats won	0
Seat change	▼1
Popular vote	44,982
Percentage	0.33%
Swing	▼0.55pp
- Results: Democratic gain Republican gain Democratic hold Republican hold Populist gain Populist hold Silver Republican hold
Speaker before election
David Henderson
Republican
Elected Speaker
David Henderson
Republican

The 1900 United States House of Representatives elections were held for the most part on November 6, 1900, with Oregon, Maine, and Vermont holding theirs early in either June or September. They coincided with the re-election of President William McKinley. Elections were held for 357 seats of the United States House of Representatives, representing 45 states, to serve in the 57th United States Congress. Special elections were also held throughout the year.

McKinley's Republican Party gained thirteen seats from the Democratic Party and minor parties, cementing their majority. A reassertion of Republican control in the Mid-Atlantic was key in the gain of new seats. However, with an improved economy, especially in the industrial sector, the election cycle featured no keystone issue, resulting in a general support for the status quo. The fading Populist Party held on to five House seats, while the sole member of the Silver Party changed parties to Democratic. This was the last time a third party headed into house elections with a party leader. All subsequent third parties to serve in the House would not select a party leader.

== Election summaries ==
↓
151	6	200
Democrat	(Note: There was 1 Silver Republican and 5 Populists.)	Republican

State	Type	Total seats	Democratic		Populist		Republican		Silver/ Silver Republican	
State	Type	Total seats	Seats	Change	Seats	Change	Seats	Change	Seats	Change
Alabama	District	9	9	▲1	0	Steady	0	▼1	0	Steady
Arkansas	District	6	6	Steady	0	Steady	0	Steady	0	Steady
California	District	7	0	▼1	0	Steady	7	▲1	0	Steady
Colorado	District	2	0	Steady	1	Steady	0	Steady	1 (Note: Includes 1 member of the Silver Republican faction, John F. Shafroth, of CO-01.)	Steady
Connecticut	District	4	0	Steady	0	Steady	4	Steady	0	Steady
Delaware	At-large	1	0	Steady	0	Steady	1	Steady	0	Steady
Florida	District	2	2	Steady	0	Steady	0	Steady	0	Steady
Georgia	District	11	11	Steady	0	Steady	0	Steady	0	Steady
Idaho	At-large	1	0	Steady	1	▲1	0	Steady	0	▼1 (Note: Previous election had 1 member from the Silver Republican Party faction.)
Illinois	District	22	11	▲3	0	Steady	11	▼3	0	Steady
Indiana	District	13	4	Steady	0	Steady	9	Steady	0	Steady
Iowa	District	11	0	Steady	0	Steady	11	Steady	0	Steady
Kansas	District +at-large	8	1	▲1	0	▼1	7	Steady	0	Steady
Kentucky	District	11	8	▼1	0	Steady	3	▲1	0	Steady
Louisiana	District	6	6	Steady	0	Steady	0	Steady	0	Steady
Maine (Note: Elections held early.)	District	4	0	Steady	0	Steady	4	Steady	0	Steady
Maryland	District	6	0	▼2	0	Steady	6	▲2	0	Steady
Massachusetts	District	13	3	Steady	0	Steady	10	Steady	0	Steady
Michigan	District	12	0	Steady	0	Steady	12	Steady	0	Steady
Minnesota	District	7	0	Steady	0	Steady	7	Steady	0	Steady
Mississippi	District	7	7	Steady	0	Steady	0	Steady	0	Steady
Missouri	District	15	12	Steady	0	Steady	3 (Note: Elections in Missouri's 12th congressional district were contested multiple times, and the seat was considered vacant for much of the 57th Congress – Republican George C. Wagoner was finally seated just before the end of the 57th Congress.)	Steady	0	Steady
Montana	At-large	1	0	▼1	1	▲1	0	Steady	0	Steady
Nebraska	District	6	2	▲1	2	▼1	2	Steady	0	Steady
Nevada	At-large	1	1	▲1	0	Steady	0	Steady	0	▼1 (Note: Previous election had 1 member from the Silver Party.)
New Hampshire	District	2	0	Steady	0	Steady	2	Steady	0	Steady
New Jersey	District	8	2	Steady	0	Steady	6	Steady	0	Steady
New York	District	34	13	▼5	0	Steady	21	▲5	0	Steady
North Carolina	District	9	7	▲1	0	▼1	2	Steady	0	Steady
North Dakota	At-large	1	0	Steady	0	Steady	1	Steady	0	Steady
Ohio	District	21	4	▼2	0	Steady	17	▲2	0	Steady
Oregon	District	2	0	Steady	0	Steady	2	Steady	0	Steady
Pennsylvania	District +2 at-large	30	4	▼6	0	Steady	26	▲6	0	Steady
Rhode Island	District	2	0	Steady	0	Steady	2	Steady	0	Steady
South Carolina	District	7	7	Steady	0	Steady	0	Steady	0	Steady
South Dakota	At-large	2	0	Steady	0	Steady	2	Steady	0	Steady
Tennessee	District	10	8	Steady	0	Steady	2	Steady	0	Steady
Texas	District	13	13	▲1	0	Steady	0	▼1	0	Steady
Utah	At-large	1	0	▼1	0	Steady	1	▲1	0	Steady
Vermont	District	2	0	Steady	0	Steady	2	Steady	0	Steady
Virginia	District	10	10	Steady	0	Steady	0	Steady	0	Steady
Washington	At-large	2	0	Steady	0	Steady	2	Steady	0	Steady
West Virginia	District	4	0	▼1	0	Steady	4	▲1	0	Steady
Wisconsin	District	10	0	Steady	0	Steady	10	Steady	0	Steady
Wyoming	At-large	1	0	Steady	0	Steady	1	Steady	0	Steady
Total		357	151 42.3%	▼10	5 1.4%	▼1	200 56.0%	▲13	1 0.3%	▼2

Popular vote
Republican	50.65%
Democratic	44.45%
Populist	2.35%
Silver Republican	0.40%
Independent	0.33%
Others	1.82%

House seats
Republican	56.02%
Democratic	42.30%
Populist	1.40%
Silver Republican	0.28%

The previous election of 1898 saw the election of 6 Populists, 2 Silver Republicans, and a Silver Party member.

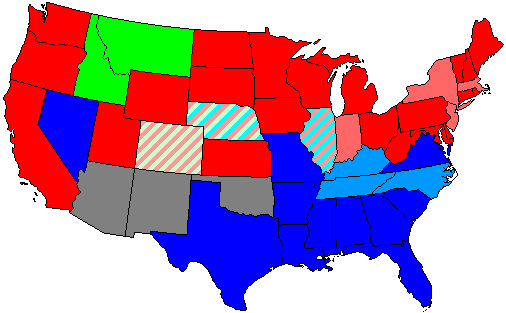
House seats by party holding plurality in state: 80+% Democratic / 80+% Populist / 80+% Republican; 60+ to 80% Democratic / / 60+ to 80% Republican; Up to 60% Democratic / Up to 60% Populist / Up to 60% Republican

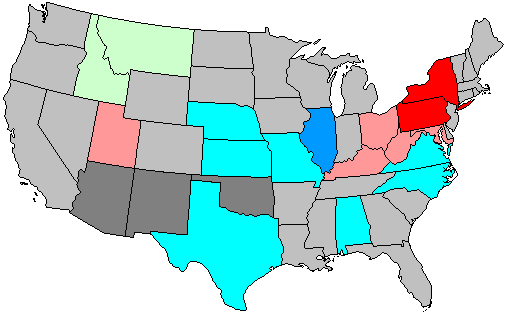
Net gain in party representation: 6+ Democratic gain / / 6+ Republican gain; 3–5 Democratic gain / / 3–5 Republican gain; 1–2 Democratic gain / 1–2 Populist gain / 1–2 Republican gain; no net change

== Election dates ==
All the states held their elections November 6, 1900, except for 3 states, with 8 seats among them:

- June 4: Oregon
- September 4: Vermont
- September 10: Maine

== Special elections ==
District	Incumbent			This race	
District	Member	Party	First elected	Results	Candidates
Maryland 1	John Walter Smith	Democratic	1898	Incumbent resigned January 12, 1900. New member elected November 6, 1900. Republican gain.	▌ ✓ Josiah Kerr (Republican) 50.88%; ▌Edwin H. Brown (Democratic) 49.12%
Pennsylvania 5	Alfred C. Harmer	Republican	1876	Incumbent died March 6, 1900. Republican hold.	▌ ✓ Edward de Veaux Morrell (Republican) 100.0%; unopposed
Alabama 8	Joseph Wheeler	Democratic	1884	Incumbent resigned April 20, 1900. Democratic hold.	▌ ✓ William Richardson (Democratic); [data missing]
Delaware at-large	John H. Hoffecker	Republican	1898	Incumbent died June 16, 1900. New member elected November 6, 1900. Republican hold.	▌ ✓ Walter O. Hoffecker (Republican) 53.50%; ▌Edward Fowler (Democratic) 45.43%; ▌Lewis M. Price (Prohibition) 0.94%; ▌John P. Mettler (Social Democratic) 0.13%
New Jersey 7	William D. Daly	Democratic	1898	Incumbent died July 31, 1900. New member elected November 6, 1900. Democratic hold.	▌ ✓ Allan L. McDermott (Democratic) 52.65%; ▌Marshall Van Winkle (Republican) 47.32%; ▌James Hickey (Independent Workers) 0.03%
California 2	Marion De Vries	Democratic	1896	Incumbent resigned August 20, 1900. New member elected November 6, 1900. Republican gain.	▌ ✓ Samuel D. Woods (Republican) 50.99%; ▌J. D. Sproul (Democratic) 49.01%
Utah at-large	William H. King	Democratic	1896	Incumbent's term expired March 3, 1899. Representative-elect B. H. Roberts was refused his seat in Congress. Incumbent re-elected to serve the unexpired term on April 2, 1900. Democratic hold.	▌ ✓ William H. King (Democratic) 53.05%; ▌James T. Hammond (Republican) 45.89%; ▌John H. Hamlin (Socialist Labor) 1.06%
Virginia 4	Sydney P. Epes	Democratic	1896	Incumbent died March 3, 1900. New member elected April 28, 1900. Democratic hold.	▌ ✓ Francis R. Lassiter (Democratic) 98.65%

J. William Stokes (Democratic) of South Carolina's 7th congressional district died in office on July 6, 1901, and was replaced in a special election by Asbury F. Lever (Democratic)

== Alabama ==
District	Incumbent			This race	
District	Member	Party	First elected	Results	Candidates
Alabama 1	George W. Taylor	Democratic	1896	Incumbent re-elected.	▌ ✓ George W. Taylor (Democratic) 82.7%; ▌ John W. Schell (Republican) 17.3%
Alabama 2	Jesse F. Stallings	Democratic	1892	Incumbent retired. Democratic hold.	▌ ✓ Ariosto A. Wiley (Democratic) 98.3%
Alabama 3	Henry D. Clayton Jr.	Democratic	1896	Incumbent re-elected.	▌ ✓ Henry D. Clayton Jr. (Democratic) 80.2%; ▌ William Oscar Mulkey (Populist/Republican) 19.0%; ▌ T. P. Hudson (Prohibition) 0.8%
Alabama 4	William F. Aldrich	Republican	1894	Incumbent retired. Democratic gain.	▌ ✓ Sydney J. Bowie (Democratic) 97.3%
Alabama 5	Willis Brewer	Democratic	1896	Incumbent lost renomination. Democratic hold.	▌ ✓ C. W. Thompson (Democratic) 66.9%; ▌ Andrew J. Milstead (Republican) 33.0%
Alabama 6	John H. Bankhead	Democratic	1886	Incumbent re-elected.	▌ ✓ John H. Bankhead (Democratic) 65.7%; ▌ Thomas B. Morton (Republican) 34.3%
Alabama 7	John L. Burnett	Democratic	1898	Incumbent re-elected.	▌ ✓ John L. Burnett (Democratic) 51.8%; ▌ Napoleon Bonaparte Spears (Populist/Republican) 48.2%
Alabama 8	Joseph Wheeler	Democratic	1884	Incumbent resigned. Winner also elected to finish term. Democratic hold.	▌ ✓ William Richardson (Democratic) 59.7%; ▌ A. N. Holland (Republican) 40.3%
Alabama 9	Oscar Underwood	Democratic	1894	Incumbent re-elected.	▌ ✓ Oscar Underwood (Democratic) 99.9%

== Arkansas ==
District	Incumbent			This race	
District	Member	Party	First elected	Results	Candidates
Arkansas 1	Philip D. McCulloch Jr.	Democratic	1892	Incumbent re-elected.	▌ ✓ Philip D. McCulloch Jr. (Democratic) 72.4%; ▌ T. O. Fitzpatrick (Republican) 27.6%
Arkansas 2	John S. Little	Democratic	1894	Incumbent re-elected.	▌ ✓ John S. Little (Democratic) 67.9%; ▌ E. H. Vance Jr. (Republican) 32.1%
Arkansas 3	Thomas C. McRae	Democratic	1885	Incumbent re-elected.	▌ ✓ Thomas C. McRae (Democratic) 63.3%; ▌ B. M. Foreman (Republican) 36.7%
Arkansas 4	William L. Terry	Democratic	1890	Incumbent lost renomination. Democratic hold.	▌ ✓ Charles C. Reid (Democratic) 65.3%; ▌ Sam Davis (Republican) 34.7%
Arkansas 5	Hugh A. Dinsmore	Democratic	1892	Incumbent re-elected.	▌ ✓ Hugh A. Dinsmore (Democratic) 61.1%; ▌ Ulysses Simpson Bratton (Republican) 39.0%
Arkansas 6	Stephen Brundidge Jr.	Democratic	1896	Incumbent re-elected.	▌ ✓ Stephen Brundidge Jr. (Democratic) 68.9%; ▌ C. F. Cole (Republican) 31.1%

== California ==
District	Incumbent			This race	
District	Member	Party	First elected	Results	Candidates
California 1	John All Barham	Republican	1894	Incumbent retired. Republican hold.	▌ ✓ Frank Coombs (Republican) 55.3%; ▌James F. Farraher (Democratic) 42.4%; ▌William Morgan (Socialist Labor) 1.6%; ▌Charles T. Clark (Prohibition) 0.8%
California 2	Marion De Vries	Democratic	1896	Incumbent resigned August 20, 1900, to accept a judicial position. Republican gain.	▌ ✓ Samuel D. Woods (Note: Also won special election to 56th Congress.) (Republican) 50.4%; ▌J. D. Sproul (Democratic) 47.9%; ▌W. F. Lockwood (Social Democratic) 0.9%; ▌W. H. Barron (Prohibition) 0.8%
California 3	Victor H. Metcalf	Republican	1898	Incumbent re-elected.	▌ ✓ Victor H. Metcalf (Republican) 58.3%; ▌Frank Freeman (Democratic) 38%; ▌R. A. Dague (Social Democratic) 2.6%; ▌Alvin W. Holt (Prohibition) 1.1%
California 4	Julius Kahn	Republican	1898	Incumbent re-elected.	▌ ✓ Julius Kahn (Republican) 55.7%; ▌R. Porter Ashe (Democratic) 38.2%; ▌Charles C. O'Donnell (Independent) 3.6%; ▌G. B. Benham (Social Democratic) 2.2%; ▌Joseph Rowell (Prohibition) 0.3%
California 5	Eugene F. Loud	Republican	1890	Incumbent re-elected.	▌ ✓ Eugene F. Loud (Republican) 55.7%; ▌J. H. Henry (Democratic) 41.3%; ▌Cameron H. King Sr. (Social Democratic) 2.2%; ▌Fred E. Caton (Prohibition) 0.8%
California 6	Russell J. Waters	Republican	1898	Incumbent retired. Republican hold	▌ ✓ James McLachlan (Republican) 51.8%; ▌William Graves (Democratic) 37.9%; ▌H. G. Wilshire (Social Democratic) 7.0%; ▌James Campbell (Prohibition) 3.2%
California 7	James C. Needham	Republican	1898	Incumbent re-elected.	▌ ✓ James C. Needham (Republican) 52.4%; ▌W. D. Crichton (Democratic) 42.4%; ▌Noble A. Richardson (Social Democratic) 3.1%; ▌A. H. Hensley (Prohibition) 2.1%

== Colorado ==
District	Incumbent			This race	
District	Member	Party	First elected	Results	Candidates
Colorado 1	John F. Shafroth	Silver Republican	1894	Incumbent re-elected.	▌ ✓ John F. Shafroth (Fusion) 55.32%; ▌Robert W. Bonynge (Republican) 42.07%; ▌S. H. Shellenger (Prohibition) 1.95%; Others: ▌Joseph Smith (Socialist Labor) 0.33%; ▌Charles M. Davis (Social Democratic) 0.32%
Colorado 2	John C. Bell	Populist	1892	Incumbent re-elected.	▌ ✓ John C. Bell (Fusion) 55.99%; ▌Herschel M. Hogg (Republican) 43.27%; Others: ▌William H. Leonard (Social Democratic) 0.41%; ▌Nixon Elliott (Socialist Labor) 0.33%

== Connecticut ==
District	Incumbent			This race	
District	Member	Party	First elected	Results	Candidates
Connecticut 1	E. Stevens Henry	Republican	1894	Incumbent re-elected.	▌ ✓ E. Stevens Henry (Republican) 58.2%; ▌Joseph P. Tuttle (Democratic) 39.1%; Others: ▌James I. Bartholomew (Prohibition) 1.1%; ▌John Doyle (Soc. Dem.) 0.8%; ▌George Tourtelotte (Soc. Labor) 0.7%
Connecticut 2	Nehemiah D. Sperry	Republican	1894	Incumbent re-elected.	▌ ✓ Nehemiah D. Sperry (Republican) 52.9%; ▌Oliver Gildersleeve (Democratic) 45.2%; Others: ▌Joseph Bearhalter (Soc. Dem.) 0.9%; ▌Milton R. Kerr (Prohibition) 0.6%; ▌Robert T. Grant (Soc. Labor) 0.5%
Connecticut 3	Charles A. Russell	Republican	1886	Incumbent re-elected.	▌ ✓ Charles A. Russell (Republican) 60.4%; ▌James H. Potter (Democratic) 38.1%; Others: ▌George S. Smith (Prohibition) 1.2%; ▌Michael Heibel (Soc. Labor) 0.2%; ▌Henry Dorkin (Soc. Dem.) 0.1%
Connecticut 4	Ebenezer J. Hill	Republican	1894	Incumbent re-elected.	▌ ✓ Ebenezer J. Hill (Republican) 58.2%; ▌Charles P. Lyman (Democratic) 40.4%; Others: ▌Abel S. Beardsley (Prohibition) 0.8%; ▌Henry H. Harris (Soc. Labor) 0.4%; ▌George W. Scott (Soc. Dem.) 0.2%

== Delaware ==
District	Incumbent			This race	
District	Member	Party	First elected	Results	Candidates
Delaware at-large	Walter O. Hoffecker	Republican	1900	Incumbent retired. Republican hold	▌ ✓ L. Heisler Ball (Republican) 53.08%; ▌Alexander M. Daly (Democratic) 45.49%; ▌Lewis M. Brosius (Prohibition) 1.30%; ▌Nathan Shtofman (Social Democratic) 0.13%

== Florida ==
District	Incumbent			This race	
District	Member	Party	First elected	Results	Candidates
Florida 1	Stephen M. Sparkman	Democratic	1894	Incumbent re-elected.	▌ ✓ Stephen M. Sparkman (Democratic) 87.0%; ▌G. Brown Patterson (Republican) 13.0%
Florida 2	Robert Wyche Davis	Democratic	1896	Incumbent re-elected.	▌ ✓ Robert Wyche Davis (Democratic) 80.0%; ▌John M. Cheney (Republican) 20.0%

== Georgia ==
District	Incumbent			This race	
District	Member	Party	First elected	Results	Candidates
Georgia 1	Rufus E. Lester	Democratic	1888	Incumbent re-elected.	▌ ✓ Rufus E. Lester (Democratic) 64.0%; ▌ William R. Leaken (Republican) 36.0%
Georgia 2	James M. Griggs	Democratic	1896	Incumbent re-elected.	▌ ✓ James M. Griggs (Democratic) 99.7%
Georgia 3	Elijah B. Lewis	Democratic	1896	Incumbent re-elected.	▌ ✓ Elijah B. Lewis (Democratic) 99.9%
Georgia 4	William C. Adamson	Democratic	1896	Incumbent re-elected.	▌ ✓ William C. Adamson (Democratic) 76.0%; ▌ A. H. Freeman (Republican) 23.5%
Georgia 5	Leonidas F. Livingston	Democratic	1890	Incumbent re-elected.	▌ ✓ Leonidas F. Livingston (Democratic) 76.6%; ▌ Charles I. Brannan (Independent) 23.3%
Georgia 6	Charles L. Bartlett	Democratic	1894	Incumbent re-elected.	▌ ✓ Charles L. Bartlett (Democratic) 94.1%; ▌ J. T. Dickey (Populist) 5.7%
Georgia 7	John W. Maddox	Democratic	1892	Incumbent re-elected.	▌ ✓ John W. Maddox (Democratic) 62.0%; ▌ S. J. McKnight (Populist) 31.1%; ▌ J. J. Hamilton (Republican) 6.9%
Georgia 8	William M. Howard	Democratic	1896	Incumbent re-elected.	▌ ✓ William M. Howard (Democratic) 92.0%; ▌ S. P. Bond (Populist) 7.9%
Georgia 9	Farish Tate	Democratic	1892	Incumbent re-elected.	▌ ✓ Farish Tate (Democratic) 83.6%; ▌ H. L. Peeples (Populist) 15.5%
Georgia 10	William H. Fleming	Democratic	1896	Incumbent re-elected.	▌ ✓ William H. Fleming (Democratic) 92.2%
Georgia 11	William G. Brantley	Democratic	1896	Incumbent re-elected.	▌ ✓ William G. Brantley (Democratic) 66.8%; ▌ W. H. Marston (Republican) 33.2%

== Idaho ==
District	Incumbent			This race	
District	Member	Party	First elected	Results	Candidates
Idaho at-large	Edgar Wilson	Silver Republican	1898	Incumbent retired. Populist gain.	▌ ✓ Thomas L. Glenn (Populist - Democrat) 51.11%; ▌John T. Morrison (Republican) 48.89%

== Illinois ==
District	Incumbent			This race	
District	Member	Party	First elected	Results	Candidates
Illinois 1	James Robert Mann	Republican	1896	Incumbent re-elected.	▌ ✓ James Robert Mann (Republican) 63.0%; ▌ Leon Hornstein (Democratic) 34.5%; ▌ William H. Collins (Social Democratic) 1.4%; ▌ Edward Loewenthal (Prohibition) 1.1%
Illinois 2	William Lorimer	Republican	1894	Incumbent lost re-election. Democratic gain.	▌ ✓ John J. Feely (Democratic) 50.1%; ▌ William Lorimer (Republican) 47.2%; ▌ Nicholas Krump (Social Democratic) 1.5%; ▌ Raymond T. Cookingham (Prohibition) 1.1%; ▌ William H. Bannigan (Populist) 0.1%
Illinois 3	George Peter Foster	Democratic	1898	Incumbent re-elected.	▌ ✓ George Peter Foster (Democratic) 55.4%; ▌ William E. O'Neill (Republican) 42.9%; ▌ H. C. Dreisvogt (Social Democratic) 0.9%; ▌ Charles A. Kelley (Prohibition) 0.6%; ▌ John S. McGrath (Single Tax) 0.1%; ▌ Edward Mulloy (Populist) 0.1%
Illinois 4	Thomas Cusack	Democratic	1898	Incumbent retired. Democratic hold.	▌ ✓ James McAndrews (Democratic) 54.4%; ▌ Daniel W. Mills (Republican) 43.1%; ▌ Braman Loveless (Prohibition) 1.9%; ▌ A. M. Simons (Social Democratic) 0.6%
Illinois 5	Edward Thomas Noonan	Democratic	1898	Incumbent retired. Democratic hold.	▌ ✓ William F. Mahoney (Democratic) 53.8%; ▌ Charles C. Carnahan (Republican) 43.8%; ▌ John Collins (Social Democratic) 1.6%; ▌ Horace H. Maddock (Prohibition) 0.8%
Illinois 6	Henry Sherman Boutell	Republican	1897	Incumbent re-elected.	▌ ✓ Henry Sherman Boutell (Republican) 49.5%; ▌ Emil Hoechster (Democratic) 48.3%; ▌ Ira J. Mason (Prohibition) 0.6%
Illinois 7	George E. Foss	Republican	1894	Incumbent re-elected	▌ ✓ George E. Foss (Republican) 57.5%; ▌ William Peacock (Democratic) 39.3%; ▌ J. W. Bartels (Social Democratic) 2.3%; ▌ Harlan P. Davidson (Prohibition) 0.9%
Illinois 8	Albert J. Hopkins	Republican	1885	Incumbent re-elected	▌ ✓ Albert J. Hopkins (Republican) 68.5%; ▌ John W. Leonard (Democratic) 28.9%; ▌ Benjamin R. Morse (Prohibition) 2.6%
Illinois 9	Robert R. Hitt	Republican	1882	Incumbent re-elected.	▌ ✓ Robert R. Hitt (Republican) 65.7%; ▌ Hiram A. Brooks (Democratic) 31.6%; ▌ Joseph H. Keagle (Prohibition) 2.7%
Illinois 10	George W. Prince	Republican	1895	Incumbent re-elected.	▌ ✓ George W. Prince (Republican) 65.2%; ▌ Lavergne B. DeForest (Democratic) 32.6%; ▌ Charles L. Logan (Prohibition) 2.2%
Illinois 11	Walter Reeves	Republican	1894	Incumbent re-elected.	▌ ✓ Walter Reeves (Republican) 56.1%; ▌ Edgar P. Holley (Democratic) 41.6%; ▌ John H. Wilson (Prohibition) 2.3%
Illinois 12	Joseph Gurney Cannon	Republican	1892	Incumbent re-elected.	▌ ✓ Joseph Gurney Cannon (Republican) 60.2%; ▌ C. M. Briggs (Democratic) 37.8%; ▌ Jacob M. Gaiser (Prohibition) 2.0%
Illinois 13	Vespasian Warner	Republican	1894	Incumbent re-elected.	▌ ✓ Vespasian Warner (Republican) 56.2%; ▌ John Eddy (Democratic) 40.6%; ▌ William P. Allen (Prohibition) 3.2%
Illinois 14	Joseph V. Graff	Republican	1894	Incumbent re-elected.	▌ ✓ Joseph V. Graff (Republican) 49.5%; ▌ Jesse Black Jr. (Democratic) 48.7%; ▌ George W. Warner (Prohibition) 1.2%; ▌ J. E. Edwards (Social Democratic) 0.6%
Illinois 15	Benjamin F. Marsh	Republican	1876	Incumbent lost re-election. Democratic gain.	▌ ✓ J. Ross Mickey (Democratic) 49.5%; ▌ Benjamin F. Marsh (Republican) 48.8%; ▌ Norton M. Rigg (Prohibition) 1.7%
Illinois 16	William E. Williams	Democratic	1898	Incumbent retired. Democratic hold.	▌ ✓ Thomas J. Selby (Democratic) 55.7%; ▌ Thomas Worthington (Republican) 42.3%; ▌ John W. Webb (Prohibition) 1.3%; ▌ G. W. Riley (Social Democratic) 0.5%; ▌ Joseph W. McGlothlin (Populist) 0.2%
Illinois 17	Ben F. Caldwell	Democratic	1898	Incumbent re-elected.	▌ ✓ Ben F. Caldwell (Democratic) 51.2%; ▌ David Ross (Republican) 47.2%; ▌ Edward D. Henry (Prohibition) 1.5%; ▌ Francis B. Bullard (Populist) 0.1%
Illinois 18	Thomas M. Jett	Democratic	1896	Incumbent re-elected.	▌ ✓ Thomas M. Jett (Democratic) 50.8%; ▌ John J. Brenholt (Republican) 47.2%; ▌ Charles J. Upton (Prohibition) 1.7%; ▌ Diedrich Balster (Populist) 0.3%
Illinois 19	Joseph B. Crowley	Democratic	1898	Incumbent re-elected.	▌ ✓ Joseph B. Crowley (Democratic) 50.7%; ▌ Horace S. Clark (Republican) 47.6%; ▌ Daniel B. Turney (Prohibition) 1.5%; ▌ Charles E. Palmer (Populist) 0.2%
Illinois 20	James R. Williams	Democratic	1898	Incumbent re-elected.	▌ ✓ James R. Williams (Democratic) 51.8%; ▌ Alexander M. Funkhouser (Republican) 46.4%; ▌ William H. Hughes (Prohibition) 1.8%
Illinois 21	William A. Rodenberg	Republican	1898	Incumbent lost re-election. Democratic gain.	▌ ✓ Fred J. Kern (Democratic) 49.8%; ▌ William A. Rodenberg (Republican) 48.8%; ▌ Henry D. East (Prohibition) 0.9%; ▌ G. A. Jennings (Social Democrat) 0.5%
Illinois 22	George Washington Smith	Republican	1888	Incumbent re-elected.	▌ ✓ George Washington Smith (Republican) 55.5%; ▌ Lindorf O. Whitnel (Democratic) 43.6%; ▌ Joseph L. Meads (Prohibition) 0.9%

== Indiana ==
District	Incumbent			This race	
District	Member	Party	First elected	Results	Candidates
Indiana 1	James A. Hemenway	Republican	1894	Incumbent re-elected.	▌ ✓ James A. Hemenway (Republican) 49.7%; ▌ Alfred Dale Owen (Democratic) 49.3%; ▌ George W. Norman (Prohibition) 1.0%
Indiana 2	Robert W. Miers	Democratic	1896	Incumbent re-elected.	▌ ✓ Robert W. Miers (Democratic) 51.8%; ▌ Peter R. Wadsworth (Republican) 46.3%; ▌ William Crowder (Prohibition) 1.4%; ▌ Charles Pressler (Populist) 0.5%
Indiana 3	William T. Zenor	Democratic	1896	Incumbent re-elected.	▌ ✓ William T. Zenor (Democratic) 54.9%; ▌ Hugh T. O'Conner (Republican) 44.4%; ▌ George W. Speedy (Prohibition) 0.7%
Indiana 4	Francis M. Griffith	Democratic	1897	Incumbent re-elected.	▌ ✓ Francis M. Griffith (Democratic) 51.2%; ▌ Nathan Powell (Republican) 47.8%; ▌ George Church (Prohibition) 1.0%; ▌ J. L. Hammond (Populist) 0.1%
Indiana 5	George W. Faris	Republican	1894	Incumbent retired. Republican hold.	▌ ✓ Elias S. Holliday (Republican) 50.6%; ▌ Frank A. Horner (Democratic) 47.3%; ▌ Lindley H. Wells (Prohibition) 1.5%; ▌ [FNU] Hoar (Social Democratic) 0.5%; ▌ [FNU] Allen (Populist) 0.1%
Indiana 6	James E. Watson	Republican	1898	Incumbent re-elected.	▌ ✓ James E. Watson (Republican) 52.0%; ▌ David W. McKee (Democratic) 45.8%; ▌ Henry C. Pitts (Prohibition) 2.1%; ▌ John Nipp (Populist) 0.1%
Indiana 7	Jesse Overstreet	Republican	1894	Incumbent re-elected.	▌ ✓ Jesse Overstreet (Republican) 52.4%; ▌ Frank B. Burke (Democratic) 45.7%; ▌ Basil L. Allen (Prohibition) 1.3%; ▌ Hugo Miller (Social Democratic) 0.3%; ▌ Henry Kuerst (Populist) 0.3%
Indiana 8	George W. Cromer	Republican	1898	Incumbent re-elected.	▌ ✓ George W. Cromer (Republican) 51.7%; ▌ Joseph T. Day (Democratic) 45.6%; ▌ Dalley Powell (Prohibition) 2.4%; ▌ William E. Hurley (Populist) 0.2%; ▌ Peter Brock (Social Democratic) 0.1%
Indiana 9	Charles B. Landis	Republican	1896	Incumbent re-elected.	▌ ✓ Charles B. Landis (Republican) 50.3%; ▌ David F. Allen (Democratic) 47.1%; ▌ Lindley T. Van Cleve (Prohibition) 2.2%; ▌ W. B. Gill (Populist) 0.4%
Indiana 10	Edgar D. Crumpacker	Republican	1896	Incumbent re-elected.	▌ ✓ Edgar D. Crumpacker (Republican) 55.5%; ▌ John Ross (Democratic) 43.3%; ▌ Charles W. Bone (Prohibition) 1.2%
Indiana 11	George Washington Steele	Republican	1894	Incumbent re-elected.	▌ ✓ George Washington Steele (Republican) 53.3%; ▌ William J. Houck (Democratic) 43.2%; ▌ Nathan Johnson (Prohibition) 3.5%
Indiana 12	James M. Robinson	Democratic	1896	Incumbent re-elected.	▌ ✓ James M. Robinson (Democratic) 49.7%; ▌ Robert B. Hanna (Republican) 48.4%; ▌ Thomas J. Mawhorter (Prohibition) 1.7%
Indiana 13	Abraham L. Brick	Republican	1898	Incumbent re-elected.	▌ ✓ Abraham L. Brick (Republican) 51.1%; ▌ Charles C. Bower (Democratic) 46.8%; ▌ Barney Uline (Prohibition) 2.1%; ▌ J. Wiley (Social Democratic) 0.1%

== Iowa ==
District	Incumbent			This race	
District	Member	Party	First elected	Results	Candidates
Iowa 1	Thomas Hedge	Republican	1898	Incumbent re-elected	▌ ✓ Thomas Hedge (Republican) 53.1%; ▌ D. J. O'Connell (Democratic) 44.8%; ▌ J. S. Tussey (Prohibition) 1.5%; ▌ E. V. Stevens (Socialist Labor) 0.6%
Iowa 2	Joseph R. Lane	Republican	1898	Incumbent retired. Republican hold.	▌ ✓ John N. W. Rumple (Republican) 50.4%; ▌ Henry Vollmer (Democratic) 47.2%; ▌ C. L. Brecken (Social Democratic) 1.6%; ▌ J. E. Hart (Prohibition) 0.6%; ▌ W. A. Westphall (Socialist Labor) 0.2%
Iowa 3	David B. Henderson	Republican	1882	Incumbent re-elected.	▌ ✓ David B. Henderson (Republican) 61.4%; ▌ Willis N. Birdsall (Democratic) 38.3%; ▌ R. M. Howe (Social Democratic) 0.2%; ▌ E. J. Dean (Independent) 0.1%
Iowa 4	Gilbert N. Haugen	Republican	1898	Incumbent re-elected.	▌ ✓ Gilbert N. Haugen (Republican) 61.2%; ▌ John Foley (Democratic) 37.1%; ▌ V. B. Pool (Prohibition) 1.3%; ▌ J. E. Anderson (Populist) 0.4%
Iowa 5	Robert G. Cousins	Republican	1892	Incumbent re-elected.	▌ ✓ Robert G. Cousins (Republican) 59.5%; ▌ Daniel Kerr (Democratic) 40.1%; ▌ George Slade (Social Democratic) 0.4%
Iowa 6	John F. Lacey	Republican	1892	Incumbent re-elected.	▌ ✓ John F. Lacey (Republican) 53.2%; ▌ A. C. Steck (Democratic/Populist) 45.9%; ▌ F. L. Rice (Social Democratic) 0.7%; ▌ J. R. Norman (Middle of the Road Populist) 0.1%; ▌ Abner Branson (Prohibition) 0.1%
Iowa 7	John A. T. Hull	Republican	1890	Incumbent re-elected.	▌ ✓ John A. T. Hull (Republican) 61.6%; ▌ George C. Crozier (Democratic/Populist) 35.4%; ▌ D. S. Grossman (Prohibition) 2.6%; ▌ L. B. Patterson (Middle of the Road Populist) 0.4%
Iowa 8	William P. Hepburn	Republican	1892	Incumbent re-elected.	▌ ✓ William P. Hepburn (Republican) 54.7%; ▌ V. R. McGinnis (Democratic) 43.6%; ▌ A. B. Wray (Prohibition) 1.7%
Iowa 9	Smith McPherson	Republican	1898	Incumbent resigned when appointed judge for the U.S. District Court for the Southern District of Iowa. Winner also elected to finish term. Republican hold.	▌ ✓ Walter I. Smith (Republican) 56.8%; ▌ S. B. Wadsworth (Democratic) 42.3%; ▌ B. S. Taylor (Prohibition) 0.9%
Iowa 10	Jonathan P. Dolliver	Republican	1888	Incumbent resigned after being appointed to the U.S. Senate. Winner also elected to finish term. Republican hold.	▌ ✓ James P. Conner (Republican) 62.9%; ▌ Robert F. Dale (Democratic) 35.5%; ▌ P. G. Shaw (Prohibition) 1.6%
Iowa 11	Lot Thomas	Republican	1898	Incumbent re-elected.	▌ ✓ Lot Thomas (Republican) 60.2%; ▌ William Muloaney (Democratic) 37.8%; ▌ H. A. Malthy (Prohibition) 2.0%

== Kansas ==
District	Incumbent			This race	
District	Member	Party	First elected	Results	Candidates
Kansas 1	Charles Curtis	Republican	1892	Incumbent re-elected.	▌ ✓ Charles Curtis (Republican) 59.1%; ▌ George Washington Glick (Democratic/Populist) 40.9%
Kansas 2	Justin De Witt Bowersock	Republican	1898	Incumbent re-elected.	▌ ✓ Justin De Witt Bowersock (Republican) 52.3%; ▌ Mason S. Peters (Democratic/Populist) 47.7%
Kansas 3	Edwin R. Ridgely	Populist	1896	Incumbent retired. Democratic gain	▌ ✓ Alfred Metcalf Jackson (Democratic/Populist) 50.0%; ▌ George W. Wheatley (Republican) 49.5%
Kansas 4	James Monroe Miller	Republican	1898	Incumbent re-elected.	▌ ✓ James Monroe Miller (Republican) 53.8%; ▌ Thomas H. Grisham (Democratic/Populist) 46.2%
Kansas 5	William A. Calderhead	Republican	1898	Incumbent re-elected.	▌ ✓ William A. Calderhead (Republican) 53.9%; ▌ William D. Vincent (Democratic/Populist) 46.1%
Kansas 6	William A. Reeder	Republican	1898	Incumbent re-elected.	▌ ✓ William A. Reeder (Republican) 48.9%; ▌ John B. Dykes (Populist) 37.6%; ▌ Tully Scott (Democratic) 13.5%
Kansas 7	Chester I. Long	Republican	1898	Incumbent re-elected.	▌ ✓ Chester I. Long (Republican) 51.2%; ▌ Claude Duval (Democratic/Populist) 48.8%
Kansas at-large	Willis J. Bailey	Republican	1898	Incumbent retired. Republican hold.	▌ ✓ Charles Frederick Scott (Republican) 52.3%; ▌ Jeremiah D. Botkin (Democratic/Populist) 46.7%; ▌ [FNU] Hoyt (Prohibition) 0.7%; ▌ [FNU] Miller (Social Democratic) 0.3%

== Kentucky ==
District	Incumbent			This race	
District	Member	Party	First elected	Results	Candidates
Kentucky 1	Charles K. Wheeler	Democratic	1896	Incumbent re-elected.	▌ ✓ Charles K. Wheeler (Democratic) 59.6%; ▌ Ben C. Keys (Republican/Populist) 39.7%; ▌ James Pile (Prohibition) 0.7%
Kentucky 2	Henry D. Allen	Democratic	1898	Incumbent re-elected.	▌ ✓ Henry D. Allen (Democratic) 53.9%; ▌ William Lynch (Republican) 45.6%; ▌ John Holmes (Populist) 0.5%
Kentucky 3	John S. Rhea	Democratic	1896	Incumbent re-elected.	▌ ✓ John S. Rhea (Democratic) 50.0%; ▌ J. McKenzie Moss (Republican) 49.6%; ▌ J. Glenn (Independent) 0.4%
Kentucky 3	John S. Rhea	Democratic	1896	Election successfully contested. Republican gain.	▌ ✓ J. McKenzie Moss (Republican); ▌ John S. Rhea (Democratic)
Kentucky 4	David Highbaugh Smith	Democratic	1896	Incumbent re-elected.	▌ ✓ David Highbaugh Smith (Democratic) 53.2%; ▌ R. M. Jolly (Republican) 46.8%
Kentucky 5	Oscar Turner	Democratic	1898	Incumbent retired. Republican gain.	▌ ✓ Harvey Samuel Irwin (Republican) 53.7%; ▌ J. P. Gregory (Democratic) 45.8%; ▌ N. F. Parker (Populist) 0.1%
Kentucky 6	Albert S. Berry	Democratic	1892	Incumbent lost renomination. Democratic hold.	▌ ✓ Daniel Linn Gooch (Democratic) 56.7%; ▌ [FNU] Shaw (Republican) 42.3%; ▌ S. E. Leeds (Independent) 1.0%
Kentucky 7	June Ward Gayle	Democratic	1899	Incumbent retired. Democratic hold.	▌ ✓ South Trimble (Democratic) 54.7%; ▌ R. P. Stoll (Republican) 45.3%
Kentucky 8	George G. Gilbert	Democratic	1898	Incumbent re-elected.	▌ ✓ George G. Gilbert (Democratic) 51.2%; ▌ John Mason Williams (Republican) 48.1%; ▌ R. L. Courtney (Prohibition) 0.7%
Kentucky 9	Samuel J. Pugh	Republican	1894	Incumbent lost re-election. Democratic gain.	▌ ✓ James N. Kehoe (Democratic) 50.3%; ▌ Samuel J. Pugh (Republican) 49.7%
Kentucky 10	Thomas Y. Fitzpatrick	Democratic	1896	Incumbent retired. Democratic hold.	▌ ✓ James Bamford White (Democratic) 51.8%; ▌ N. T. Hopkins (Republican) 48.2%
Kentucky 11	Vincent Boreing	Republican	1898	Incumbent re-elected.	▌ ✓ Vincent Boreing (Republican) 69.2%; ▌ Benjamin Smith (Democratic) 30.8%

== Louisiana ==
District	Incumbent			This race	
District	Member	Party	First elected	Results	Candidates
Louisiana 1	Adolph Meyer	Democratic	1890	Incumbent re-elected.	▌ ✓ Adolph Meyer (Democratic) 81.0%; ▌William Brophy (Republican) 18.9%
Louisiana 2	Robert C. Davey	Democratic	1896	Incumbent re-elected.	▌ ✓ Robert C. Davey (Democratic) 77.8%; ▌ Samuel C. Heaslip (Republican) 22.0%
Louisiana 3	Robert F. Broussard	Democratic	1896	Incumbent re-elected.	▌ ✓ Robert F. Broussard (Democratic) 62.3%; ▌Frank B. Williams (Republican) 37.7%
Louisiana 4	Phanor Breazeale	Democratic	1898	Incumbent re-elected	▌ ✓ Phanor Breazeale (Democratic) 86.9%; ▌ F. M. Welch (Republican) 13.1%
Louisiana 5	Joseph E. Ransdell	Democratic	1899	Incumbent re-elected.	▌ ✓ Joseph E. Ransdell (Democratic) 90.8%; ▌ Henry E. Hardtner (Republican) 9.2%
Louisiana 6	Samuel M. Robertson	Democratic	1887	Incumbent re-elected.	▌ ✓ Samuel M. Robertson (Democratic) 83.6%; ▌ James H. Ducote (Republican) 16.4%

== Maine ==
District	Incumbent			This race	
District	Member	Party	First elected	Results	Candidates
Maine 1	Amos L. Allen	Republican	1899	Incumbent re-elected.	▌ ✓ Amos L. Allen (Republican) 60.3%; ▌ John J. Lynch (Democratic) 34.0%; ▌ Daniel P. Parker (Prohibition) 5.2%; ▌ Clinton Simonton (Social Democratic) 0.5%
Maine 2	Charles E. Littlefield	Republican	1899	Incumbent re-elected	▌ ✓ Charles E. Littlefield (Republican) 61.0%; ▌ H. H. Monroe (Democratic) 36.3%; ▌ Oren S. French (Prohibition) 2.3%; ▌ A. L. Carlton (Social Democratic) 0.4%
Maine 3	Edwin C. Burleigh	Republican	1897	Incumbent re-elected.	▌ ✓ Edwin C. Burleigh (Republican) 60.7%; ▌ A. F. Gerald (Democratic) 36.4%; ▌ William S. Thompson (Prohibition) 1.9%; ▌ Charles L. Nye (Social Democratic) 1.0%
Maine 4	Charles A. Boutelle	Republican	1882	Incumbent re-elected but resigned before the start of the new term.	▌ ✓ Charles A. Boutelle (Republican) 66.3%; ▌ Thomas White (Democratic) 30.9%; ▌ Timothy P. Humphrey (Prohibition) 2.6%

== Maryland ==
District	Incumbent			This race	
District	Member	Party	First elected	Results	Candidates
Maryland 1	John Walter Smith	Democratic	1898	Incumbent resigned January 12, 1900, upon being elected Governor. Republican gain.	▌ ✓ William H. Jackson (Republican) 50.2% (Note: Josiah Kerr (Republican) elected on same date to fill remainder of the term in the 56th Congress.); ▌ John P. Moore (Democratic) 46.3%; ▌George A. Cox (Prohibition) 3.4%; ▌George W. Covington (Independent) 0.0%
Maryland 2	William Benjamin Baker	Republican	1894	Incumbent retired. Republican hold	▌ ✓ Albert Blakeney (Republican) 48.7%; ▌J. Frederick C. Talbott (Democratic) 48.2%; ▌John W. Angell (Prohibition) 1.8%; ▌Nicholas W. Steele (Ind. Democratic) 1.3%
Maryland 3	Frank C. Wachter	Republican	1898	Incumbent re-elected.	▌ ✓ Frank C. Wachter (Republican) 51.8%; ▌Robert Fulton Leach, Jr. (Democratic) 46.8%; Others: ▌Henry Louis Hillegeist (Prohibition) 0.7%; ▌Henry F. Magness (Union Reform) 0.1%; ▌Levin Thomas Jones (Social Democratic) 0.6%
Maryland 4	James W. Denny	Democratic	1898	Incumbent lost re-election. Republican gain.	▌ ✓ Charles R. Schirm (Republican) 50.7%; ▌James W. Denny (Democratic) 45.9%; ▌Charles C. O'Donnell (Independent) 3.6%; Others: ▌William Gisriel (Prohibition) 0.7%; ▌Charles B. Backman (Social Democratic) 0.1%
Maryland 5	Sydney E. Mudd I	Republican	1896	Incumbent re-elected.	▌ ✓ Sydney E. Mudd I (Republican) 54.2%; ▌Benjamin H. Camalier (Democratic) 44.8%; ▌William H. Thompson (Prohibition) 0.9%
Maryland 6	George A. Pearre	Republican	1898	Incumbent re-elected	▌ ✓ George A. Pearre (Republican) 53.0%; ▌Charles A. Little (Democratic) 45.4%; ▌Samuel M. Hockman (Prohibition) 1.6%; Others: ▌George M. Fisher (Ind. Republican) 0.1%; ▌Robert W. Stevens (Independent) 0.0%; ▌Charles T. Little (Unknown) 0.0%

== Massachusetts ==
District	Incumbent			This race	
District	Member	Party	First elected	Results	Candidates
Massachusetts 1	George P. Lawrence	Republican	1897 (special)	Incumbent re-elected.	▌ ✓ George P. Lawrence (Republican) 58.0%; ▌James H. Bryan (Democratic) 38.4%; ▌Theodore Koehler (Social Democratic) 1.9%; ▌Kermann Koepke (Socialist Labor) 1.7%
Massachusetts 2	Frederick H. Gillett	Republican	1892	Incumbent re-elected.	▌ ✓ Frederick H. Gillett (Republican) 60.8%; ▌Thomas W. Keneflick (Democratic) 36.9%; ▌Charles Rawbone (Social Democratic) 2.3%
Massachusetts 3	John R. Thayer	Democratic	1898	Incumbent re-elected.	▌ ✓ John R. Thayer (Democratic) 50.2%; ▌Charles G. Washburn (Republican) 49.8%
Massachusetts 4	George W. Weymouth	Republican	1892	Incumbent retired. Republican hold.	▌ ✓ Charles Q. Tirrell (Republican) 65.3%; ▌Charles D. Lewis (Democratic) 34.7%
Massachusetts 5	William S. Knox	Republican	1894	Incumbent re-elected.	▌ ✓ William S. Knox (Republican) 49.4%; ▌Joseph J. Flynn (Democratic) 48.1%; ▌Orion L. Woodbury (Socialist Labor) 1.3%; ▌William S. Searle (Prohibition) 1.0%; ▌Charles Franklin Jackman (People's) 0.4%
Massachusetts 6	William H. Moody	Republican	1895 (special)	Incumbent re-elected.	▌ ✓ William H. Moody (Republican) 64.6%; ▌Daniel N. Crowley (Democratic) 23.0%; ▌Albert L. Gillen (Social Democratic) 9.6%; ▌Ernest C. Peabody (Socialist Labor) 2.7%
Massachusetts 7	Ernest W. Roberts	Republican	1898	Incumbent re-elected.	▌ ✓ Ernest W. Roberts (Republican) 60.3%; ▌Henry Winn (Democratic) 33.3%; ▌Michael D. Fitzgerald (Socialist Labor) 3.3%; ▌John Cramb (Social Democratic) 3.2%
Massachusetts 8	Samuel W. McCall	Republican	1892	Incumbent re-elected.	▌ ✓ Samuel W. McCall (Republican) 69.4%; ▌Philip T. Nickerson (Democratic) 27.8%; ▌William E. Stacey (Socialist Labor) 2.8%
Massachusetts 9	John F. Fitzgerald	Democratic	1894	Incumbent retired. Democratic hold.	▌ ✓ Joseph A. Conry (Democratic) 66.7%; ▌Charles T. Witt (Republican) 30.1%; ▌John W. Sherman (Social Democratic) 3.3%
Massachusetts 10	Henry F. Naphen	Democratic	1898	Incumbent re-elected.	▌ ✓ Henry F. Naphen (Democratic) 59.0%; ▌George B. Pierce (Republican) 41.0%
Massachusetts 11	Charles F. Sprague	Republican	1892	Incumbent retired. Republican hold.	▌ ✓ Samuel L. Powers (Republican) 60.0%; ▌William H. Baker (Democratic) 30.0%; ▌Moorfield Storey (Independent) 7.9%; ▌John A. McIsaac (Social Democratic) 2.0%
Massachusetts 12	William C. Lovering	Republican	1896	Incumbent re-elected.	▌ ✓ William C. Lovering (Republican) 76.9%; ▌Charles F. King (Democratic) 25.7%; ▌Charles E. Lowell (Social Democratic) 8.3%; ▌George J. Hunt (Socialist Labor) 2.9%; ▌Herman T. Regnell (Prohibition) 1.7%
Massachusetts 13	William S. Greene	Republican	1898 (special)	Incumbent re-elected.	▌ ✓ William S. Greene (Republican) 69.1%; ▌Charles T. Luce (Democratic) 25.2%; ▌Herbert L. Chipman (Prohibition) 3.7%; ▌William Swindlehurst (Socialist Labor) 2.0%

== Michigan ==
District	Incumbent			This race	
District	Member	Party	First elected	Results	Candidates
Michigan 1	John Blaisdell Corliss	Republican	1894	Incumbent re-elected.	▌ ✓ John Blaisdell Corliss (Republican) 54.0%; ▌ Rufus W. Jacklin (Democratic) 44.2%; ▌ F. W. Herbertz (Social Democratic) 0.6%; ▌ Will W. Tracy (Prohibition) 0.6%; ▌ Anthony Louwett (Socialist Labor) 0.6%
Michigan 2	Henry C. Smith	Republican	1898	Incumbent re-elected.	▌ ✓ Henry C. Smith (Republican) 52.4%; ▌ Martin G. Loennecker (Democratic) 45.5%; ▌ F. W. Corbett (Prohibition) 2.1%
Michigan 3	Washington Gardner	Republican	1898	Incumbent re-elected.	▌ ✓ Washington Gardner (Republican) 53.3%; ▌ Stephen D. Williams (Democratic) 43.6%; ▌ Oliver H. Perry (Prohibition) 2.1%; ▌ George H. West (Social Democratic) 1.0%
Michigan 4	Edward L. Hamilton	Republican	1896	Incumbent re-elected.	▌ ✓ Edward L. Hamilton (Republican) 55.6%; ▌ Roman I. Jarvis (Democratic) 42.4%; ▌ Charles A. Sayler (Prohibition) 2.0%
Michigan 5	William Alden Smith	Republican	1894	Incumbent re-elected.	▌ ✓ William Alden Smith (Republican) 55.6%; ▌ William F. McKnight (Democratic) 42.8%
Michigan 6	Samuel W. Smith	Republican	1896	Incumbent re-elected.	▌ ✓ Samuel W. Smith (Republican) 53.9%; ▌ Everett L. Bray (Democratic) 43.4%; ▌ Nathan Norton Clark (Prohibition) 2.7%
Michigan 7	Edgar Weeks	Republican	1898	Incumbent re-elected.	▌ ✓ Edgar Weeks (Republican) 57.7%; ▌ Justin R. Whiting (Democratic) 40.1%; ▌ Julian S. West (Prohibition) 2.2%
Michigan 8	Joseph W. Fordney	Republican	1898	Incumbent re-elected.	▌ ✓ Joseph W. Fordney (Republican) 53.5%; ▌ Wellington R. Burt (Democratic) 42.8%; ▌ H. E. Fraser (Prohibition) 1.7%; ▌ John Kortan (Social Democratic) 1.1%; ▌ P. R. Crosby (Populist) 0.2%
Michigan 9	Roswell P. Bishop	Republican	1894	Incumbent re-elected.	▌ ✓ Roswell P. Bishop (Republican) 62.4%; ▌ Frank W. Fowler (Democratic) 35.5%; ▌ Edwin S. Palmiter (Prohibition) 2.1%
Michigan 10	Rousseau O. Crump	Republican	1894	Incumbent re-elected.	▌ ✓ Rousseau O. Crump (Republican) 59.3%; ▌ Lee E. Joslyn (Democratic) 38.8%; ▌ Joseph Leighton (Prohibition) 1.9%
Michigan 11	William S. Mesick	Republican	1896	Incumbent lost renomination. Republican hold.	▌ ✓ Archibald B. Darragh (Republican) 66.1%; ▌ George Killeen (Democratic) 33.7%; ▌ Edward J. McMullen (Prohibition) 0.2%
Michigan 12	Carlos D. Shelden	Republican	1896	Incumbent re-elected.	▌ ✓ Carlos D. Shelden (Republican) 72.7%; ▌ Edward F. Legendre (Democratic) 24.8%; ▌ John Kaminen (Prohibition) 2.5%

== Minnesota ==
District	Incumbent			This race	
District	Member	Party	First elected	Results	Candidates
Minnesota 1	James A. Tawney	Republican	1892	Incumbent re-elected.	▌ ✓ James A. Tawney (Republican) 56.0%; ▌L. L. Brown (Democratic/Populist) 44.0%
Minnesota 2	James McCleary	Republican	1892	Incumbent re-elected.	▌ ✓ James McCleary (Republican) 59.8%; ▌Marvin E. Mathews (Democratic/Populist) 37.1%; ▌Samuel D. Works (Prohibition) 3.1%
Minnesota 3	Joel Heatwole	Republican	1894	Incumbent re-elected.	▌ ✓ Joel Heatwole (Republican) 57.7%; ▌Albert Schaller (Democratic/Populist) 41.2%; ▌John R. Lowe (Midroad Populist) 1.1%
Minnesota 4	Frederick Stevens	Republican	1896	Incumbent re-elected.	▌ ✓ Frederick Stevens (Republican) 57.7%; ▌Alexander Stone (Democratic/Populist) 40.3%; ▌Charles Scanlon (Prohibition) 1.9%
Minnesota 5	Loren Fletcher	Republican	1892	Incumbent re-elected.	▌ ✓ Loren Fletcher (Republican) 55.4%; ▌Sylvanus Stockwell (Democratic) 34.3%; ▌John W. Johnson (Socialist Labor) 2.4%; ▌Edwin Phillips (Ind. Prohibition) 2.2%; ▌Adolph Hirschfield (Social Democratic) 1.7%
Minnesota 6	Page Morris	Republican	1896	Incumbent re-elected.	▌ ✓ Page Morris (Republican) 55.5%; ▌Henry Truelson (Democratic/Populist) 42.3%; ▌Peter J. Seberger (Midroad Populist) 1.2%; ▌John P. Johnson (Socialist Labor) 1.1%
Minnesota 7	Frank Eddy	Republican	1894	Incumbent re-elected.	▌ ✓ Frank Eddy (Republican) 51.8%; ▌Michael J. Daly (Democratic/Populist) 42.3%; ▌Hans H. Aaker (Prohibition) 5.0%; ▌Haldor E. Boen (Referendum) 0.9%

== Mississippi ==
District	Incumbent			This race	
District	Member	Party	First elected	Results	Candidates
Mississippi 1	John M. Allen	Democratic	1884	Incumbent retired. Democratic hold.	▌ ✓ Ezekiel S. Candler Jr. (Democratic) 95.35%; ▌J. M. Dickey (Republican) 4.65%
Mississippi 2	Thomas Spight	Democratic	1898 (special)	Incumbent re-elected.	▌ ✓ Thomas Spight (Democratic) 93.79%; ▌John S. Burton (Republican) 6.21%
Mississippi 3	Thomas C. Catchings	Democratic	1884	Incumbent retired. Democratic hold	▌ ✓ Pat Henry (Democratic) 100%
Mississippi 4	Andrew F. Fox	Democratic	1896	Incumbent re-elected.	▌ ✓ Andrew F. Fox (Democratic) 85.96%; ▌W. D. Frazee (Republican) 7.20%; ▌Ralph Brewer (Populist) 6.84%
Mississippi 5	John S. Williams	Democratic	1892	Incumbent re-elected.	▌ ✓ John S. Williams (Democratic) 100%
Mississippi 6	Frank A. McLain	Democratic	1898 (special)	Incumbent re-elected.	▌ ✓ Frank A. McLain (Democratic) 87.03%; ▌H. C. Turley (Republican) 12.97%
Mississippi 7	Patrick Henry	Democratic	1896	Incumbent lost renomination. Democratic hold.	▌ ✓ Charles E. Hooker (Democratic) 92.60%; ▌N. M. Hollingsworth (Midroad-Populist) 7.40%

== Missouri ==
District	Incumbent			This race	
District	Member	Party	First elected	Results	Candidates
Missouri 1	James T. Lloyd	Democratic	1897	Incumbent re-elected.	▌ ✓ James T. Lloyd (Democratic) 55.4%; ▌ Samuel M. Pickler (Republican) 44.5%
Missouri 2	William W. Rucker	Democratic	1898	Incumbent re-elected.	▌ ✓ William W. Rucker (Democratic) 57.4%; ▌ William C. Irwin (Republican) 42.4%
Missouri 3	John Dougherty	Democratic	1898	Incumbent re-elected.	▌ ✓ John Dougherty (Democratic) 54.5%; ▌ William S. Leeper (Republican) 45.3%
Missouri 4	Charles F. Cochran	Democratic	1896	Incumbent re-elected.	▌ ✓ Charles F. Cochran (Democratic) 53.1%; ▌ John Kennish (Republican) 46.9%
Missouri 5	William S. Cowherd	Democratic	1896	Incumbent re-elected.	▌ ✓ William S. Cowherd (Democratic) 52.7%; ▌ William D. Brown (Republican) 46.4%; ▌ H. C. Marfording (Social Democratic) 0.9%
Missouri 6	David A. De Armond	Democratic	1890	Incumbent re-elected.	▌ ✓ David A. De Armond (Democratic) 53.9%; ▌ Samuel W. Jurden (Republican) 44.0%; ▌ William O. Atkeson (Populist) 2.1%
Missouri 7	James Cooney	Democratic	1896	Incumbent re-elected.	▌ ✓ James Cooney (Democratic) 55.4%; ▌ Harry H. Parsons (Republican) 44.6%
Missouri 8	Dorsey W. Shackleford	Democratic	1899	Incumbent re-elected.	▌ ✓ Dorsey W. Shackleford (Democratic) 53.4%; ▌ James T. Moore (Republican) 46.5%
Missouri 9	Champ Clark	Democratic	1896	Incumbent re-elected.	▌ ✓ Champ Clark (Democratic) 53.9%; ▌ Daniel S. Flagg (Republican) 46.1%
Missouri 10	Richard Bartholdt	Republican	1892	Incumbent re-elected.	▌ ✓ Richard Bartholdt (Republican) 55.2%; ▌ August Bolte (Democratic) 40.7%; ▌ T. M. Putnam (Social Democratic) 3.2%; ▌ J. J. Ernst (Socialist Labor) 0.8%
Missouri 11	Charles F. Joy	Republican	1894	Incumbent re-elected.	▌ ✓ Charles F. Joy (Republican) 51.7%; ▌ Patrick O'Malley (Democratic) 46.6%; ▌ Charles F. Gebelin (Social Democratic) 1.2%; ▌ Henry J. Poelling (Prohibition) 0.5%
Missouri 12	Charles E. Pearce	Republican	1896	Incumbent retired. Democratic gain.	▌ ✓ James Joseph Butler (Democratic) 53.2%; ▌ William M. Horton (Republican) 44.7%; ▌ Charles Specht (Socialist Labor) 1.7%; ▌ William Billsbarrow (Social Democratic) 0.4%
Missouri 12	Charles E. Pearce	Republican	1896	Election successfully contested. Seat declared vacant June 28, 1902.	
Missouri 13	Edward Robb	Democratic	1896	Incumbent re-elected.	▌ ✓ Edward Robb (Democratic) 53.7%; ▌ John H. Reppy (Republican) 46.23%
Missouri 14	Willard Duncan Vandiver	Democratic	1896	Incumbent re-elected.	▌ ✓ Willard Duncan Vandiver (Democratic) 53.0%; ▌ Norman A. Mozley (Republican) 46.8%
Missouri 15	Maecenas E. Benton	Democratic	1896	Incumbent re-elected.	▌ ✓ Maecenas E. Benton (Democratic) 53.5%; ▌ John R. Holmes (Republican) 45.3%; ▌ R. Doliver (Social Democratic) 1.1%

== Montana ==
District	Incumbent			This race	
District	Member	Party	First elected	Results	Candidates
Montana at-large	Albert J. Campbell	Democratic	1898	Incumbent retired. Populist gain.	▌ ✓ Caldwell Edwards (Populist/Democratic) 45.82%; ▌Samuel G. Murray (Republican) 37.80%; ▌Cornelius F. Kelley (Ind. Democratic) 15.38%; ▌Martin J. Elliott (Social Democratic) 1.00%

== Nebraska ==
District	Incumbent			This race	
District	Member	Party	First elected	Results	Candidates
Nebraska 1	Elmer Burkett	Republican	1898	Incumbent re-elected.	▌ ✓ Elmer Burkett (Republican) 53.07%; ▌George W. Berge (Democratic/Populist) 45.16%; ▌S. T. Davies (Prohibition) 1.30%; Others: ▌G. W. Brewster (Midroad-Populist) 0.23%; Scattering 0.25%
Nebraska 2	David H. Mercer	Republican	1892	Incumbent re-elected.	▌ ✓ David H. Mercer (Republican) 51.76%; ▌Edgar Howard (Democratic/Populist) 47.08%; Others: ▌George E. Baird (Social Democratic) 0.89%; ▌John Jeffcoat (Midroad-Populist) 0.27%
Nebraska 3	John S. Robinson	Democratic	1898	Incumbent re-elected.	▌ ✓ John S. Robinson (Democratic/Populist) 49.39%; ▌John R. Hays (Republican) 49.00%; ▌Isaiah Lightner (Prohibition) 1.21%; ▌Eugene A. Crum (Midroad-Populist) 0.41%
Nebraska 4	William L. Stark	Populist	1896	Incumbent re-elected.	▌ ✓ William L. Stark (Populist/Democratic) 49.88%; ▌John D. Pope (Republican) 48.46%; ▌Paul C. Burhaus (Prohibition) 1.66%
Nebraska 5	Roderick D. Sutherland	Populist	1896	Incumbent retired. Democratic gain.	▌ ✓ Ashton C. Shallenberger (Democratic/Populist) 49.35%; ▌Webster L. Morlan (Republican) 48.21%; ▌James A. Armstrong (Prohibition) 1.52%; ▌James K. Stevens (Midroad-Populist) 0.91%
Nebraska 6	William Neville	Populist	1899 (special)	Incumbent re-elected.	▌ ✓ William Neville (Populist/Democratic) 48.72%; ▌Moses Kinkaid (Republican) 48.17%; ▌P. W. Hannible (Prohibition) 1.85%; ▌C. T. Holliday (Midroad-Populist) 1.27%

== Nevada ==
District	Incumbent			This race	
District	Member	Party	First elected	Results	Candidates
Nevada at-large	Francis G. Newlands	Democratic	1892	Incumbent re-elected.	▌ ✓ Francis G. Newlands (Dem./Silver) 58.8%; ▌Edward S. Farrington (Republican) 41.2%

== New Hampshire ==
District	Incumbent			This race	
District	Member	Party	First elected	Results	Candidates
New Hampshire 1	Cyrus A. Sulloway	Republican	1894	Incumbent re-elected.	▌ ✓ Cyrus A. Sulloway (Republican) 58.6%; ▌ Timothy J. Howard (Democratic) 39.1%; ▌ Charles T. Wiggan (Prohibition) 1.3%; ▌ S. F. Clafin (Social Democratic) 1.0%
New Hampshire 2	Frank G. Clarke	Republican	1896	Incumbent retired and died before next term began. Republican hold.	▌ ✓ Frank D. Currier (Republican) 60.0%; ▌ George E. Bales (Democratic) 38.3%; ▌ Henry O. Jackson (Prohibition) 1.2%; ▌ Harris Towle (Social Democratic) 0.5%

== New Jersey ==
District	Incumbent			This race	
District	Member	Party	First elected	Results	Candidates
New Jersey 1	Henry C. Loudenslager	Republican	1892	Incumbent re-elected.	▌ ✓ Henry C. Loudenslager (Republican) 59.7%; ▌ George Pfeiffer Jr. (Democratic) 35.8%; ▌ George J. Haven (Prohibition) 3.6%; ▌ Paul E. Eberding (Social Democratic) 0.7%; ▌ Louis L. Weilenback (Socialist Labor) 0.2%
New Jersey 2	John J. Gardner	Republican	1892	Incumbent re-elected.	▌ ✓ John J. Gardner (Republican) 62.0%; ▌ Thomas J. Prickett (Democratic) 34.3%; ▌ Harry S. Powell (Prohibition) 2.8%; ▌ J. Louis Pancoast (Social Democratic) 0.8%; ▌ Emil F. Wegener (Socialist Labor) 0.1%
New Jersey 3	Benjamin F. Howell	Republican	1894	Incumbent re-elected.	▌ ✓ Benjamin F. Howell (Republican) 55.0%; ▌ James J. Bergen (Democratic) 42.6%; ▌ Charles F. Garrison (Prohibition) 1.7%; ▌ Morris Freedman (Social Democratic) 0.5%; ▌ George P. Herrschaft (Socialist Labor) 0.2%
New Jersey 4	Joshua S. Salmon	Democratic	1898	Incumbent re-elected.	▌ ✓ Joshua S. Salmon (Democratic) 50.1%; ▌ H. Burdett Herr (Republican) 45.9%; ▌ William B. Osborn (Prohibition) 3.2%; ▌ George H. Strobell (Social Democratic) 0.7%; ▌ Frank W. Wilson (Socialist Labor) 0.2%
New Jersey 5	James F. Stewart	Republican	1894	Incumbent re-elected.	▌ ✓ James F. Stewart (Republican) 53.6%; ▌ John Johnson (Democratic) 43.4%; ▌ W. H. Wyatt (Social Democratic) 1.1%; ▌ Benjamin S. Dormida (Prohibition) 1.0%; ▌ L. A. Magnet (Socialist Labor) 0.9%
New Jersey 6	Richard W. Parker	Republican	1894	Incumbent re-elected.	▌ ✓ Richard W. Parker (Republican) 60.7%; ▌ George H. Lambert (Democratic) 36.0%; ▌ Thomas A. Jones (Social Democratic) 1.6%; ▌ Moritz Hoffman (Socialist Labor) 1.0%; ▌ Richardson Gray (Prohibition) 0.7%
New Jersey 7	William D. Daly	Democratic	1898	Incumbent died. Winner also elected to finish term. Democratic hold.	▌ ✓ Allan L. McDermott (Democratic) 50.4%; ▌ Marshall Van Winkle (Republican) 45.5%; ▌ Frederick Kraft (Social Democratic) 2.1%; ▌ Thomas Jacob (Socialist Labor) 1.5%; ▌ Joel W. Brown (Prohibition) 0.5%
New Jersey 8	Charles N. Fowler	Republican	1894	Incumbent re-elected.	▌ ✓ Charles N. Fowler (Republican) 58.8%; ▌ Edward A. S. Man (Democratic) 37.9%; ▌ Paul Koch (Social Democratic) 1.5%; ▌ Thomas J. Kennedy (Prohibition) 1.1%; ▌ Jacob Grief (Socialist Labor) 0.7%

== New York ==
District	Incumbent			This race	
District	Member	Party	First elected	Results	Candidates
New York 1	Townsend Scudder	Democratic	1898	Incumbent retired. Republican gain.	▌ ✓ Frederic Storm (Republican) 51.2%; ▌ Rowland Miles (Democratic) 46.9%; ▌ Gustav J. Talleur (Prohibition) 1.3%; ▌ Leslie E. Stiles (Socialist Labor) 0.6%
New York 2	John J. Fitzgerald	Democratic	1898	Incumbent re-elected.	▌ ✓ John J. Fitzgerald (Democratic) 50.1%; ▌ Henry B. Ketcham (Republican) 49.2%; ▌ Kimball H. Stiles (Socialist Labor) 0.4%; ▌ Adolph O. Carson (Prohibition) 0.3%
New York 3	Edmund H. Driggs	Democratic	1897	Incumbent lost re-election. Republican gain.	▌ ✓ Henry Bristow (Republican) 51.4%; ▌ Edmund H. Driggs (Democratic) 47.7%; ▌ Stephen J. Mummery (Socialist Labor) 0.5%; ▌ Henry Thompson (Prohibition) 0.4%
New York 4	Bertram T. Clayton	Democratic	1898	Incumbent lost re-election. Republican gain.	▌ ✓ Harry A. Hanbury (Republican) 50.8%; ▌ Bertram T. Clayton (Democratic) 47.9%; ▌ Hugo Vogt (Socialist Labor) 1.0%; ▌ Edward R. Keeler (Prohibition) 0.3%
New York 5	Frank E. Wilson	Democratic	1898	Incumbent re-elected.	▌ ✓ Frank E. Wilson (Democratic) 49.1%; ▌ Jacob Worth (Republican) 47.1%; ▌ William Hagen (Social Democratic) 2.5%; ▌ Charles S. Vander Porten (Socialist Labor) 1.1%; ▌ Henry T. Hinsch (Prohibition) 0.2%
New York 6	Mitchell May	Democratic	1898	Incumbent retired. Democratic hold.	▌ ✓ George H. Lindsay (Democratic) 54.7%; ▌ Bert Reiss (Republican) 43.8%; ▌ Frederick Frederickson (Socialist Labor) 1.0%; ▌ Oscar J. Copeland (Prohibition) 0.3%; ▌ George H. McVey (Social Democratic) 0.2%
New York 7	Nicholas Muller	Democratic	1898	Incumbent re-elected.	▌ ✓ Nicholas Muller (Democratic) 58.5%; ▌ James Rowan O'Beirne (Republican) 39.9%; ▌ Bert Clark (Socialist Labor) 0.7%; ▌ William H. Depuy (Prohibition) 0.6%
New York 8	Daniel J. Riordan	Democratic	1898	Incumbent retired. Democratic hold.	▌ ✓ Thomas J. Creamer (Democratic) 50.1%; ▌ Richard Van Cott (Republican) 49.3%; ▌ Joseph A. Job (Socialist Labor) 0.4%; ▌ John Glover (Prohibition) 0.2%
New York 9	Thomas J. Bradley	Democratic	1896	Incumbent retired. Democratic hold.	▌ ✓ Henry M. Goldfogle (Democratic) 57.6%; ▌ Theodore Cox (Republican) 31.6%; ▌ Rudolph Katz (Socialist Labor) 5.4%; ▌ Alexander Jonas (Social Democratic) 5.1%; ▌ Timothy N. Holden (Prohibition) 0.3%
New York 10	Amos J. Cummings	Democratic	1895	Incumbent re-elected.	▌ ✓ Amos J. Cummings (Democratic) 60.9%; ▌ John Glass Jr. (Republican) 38.1%; ▌ Charles G. Teche (Socialist Labor) 0.7%; ▌ Egbert G. Barton (Prohibition) 0.3%
New York 11	William Sulzer	Democratic	1894	Incumbent re-elected.	▌ ✓ William Sulzer (Democratic) 55.7%; ▌ Charles Schwick (Republican) 35.6%; ▌ Benjamin F. Keinard (Socialist Labor) 4.9%; ▌ Emil Mueller (Social Democratic) 3.7%; ▌ William J. Hannemann (Prohibition) 0.1%
New York 12	George B. McClellan Jr.	Democratic	1894	Incumbent re-elected.	▌ ✓ George B. McClellan Jr. (Democratic) 57.9%; ▌ Herbert Parsons (Republican) 41.0%; ▌ Dow Hasman (Socialist Labor) 1.0%; ▌ Richard W. Turner (Prohibition) 0.1%
New York 13	Jefferson Monroe Levy	Democratic	1898	Incumbent retired. Democratic hold.	▌ ✓ Oliver Belmont (Democratic) 53.7%; ▌ William Russell Willcox (Republican) 44.0%; ▌ Robert Hill (Social Democratic) 1.2%; ▌ John Fitzgerald (Socialist Labor) 0.9%; ▌ Thomas B. Bolton (Prohibition) 0.2%
New York 14	William A. Chanler	Democratic	1898	Incumbent retired. Republican gain.	▌ ✓ William H. Douglas (Republican) 52.0%; ▌ John Sprunt Hill (Democratic) 45.3%; ▌ Emil Neppel (Social Democratic) 1.3%; ▌ Peter Carroll (Socialist Labor) 0.9%; ▌ James H. Yarnall (Prohibition) 0.2%
New York 15	Jacob Ruppert	Democratic	1898	Incumbent re-elected.	▌ ✓ Jacob Ruppert (Democratic) 49.6%; ▌ Elias Goodman (Republican) 46.8%; ▌ William Ehret (Social Democratic) 2.1%; ▌ Stephen D. Cooper (Socialist Labor) 1.3%; ▌ Albert Wadhams (Prohibition) 0.2%
New York 16	John Q. Underhill	Democratic	1898	Incumbent retired. Democratic hold.	▌ ✓ Cornelius Amory Pugsley (Democratic) 48.8%; ▌ Norton P. Otis (Republican) 47.9%; ▌ William Wessling (Social Democratic) 1.4%; ▌ John J. Kinneally (Socialist Labor) 1.3%; ▌ Francis Crawford (Prohibition) 0.6%
New York 17	Arthur S. Tompkins	Republican	1898	Incumbent re-elected.	▌ ✓ Arthur S. Tompkins (Republican) 54.9%; ▌ John D. Blauvelt (Democratic) 43.5%; ▌ Newton Wray (Prohibition) 1.3%; ▌ Edward A. Gridley (Socialist Labor) 0.3%
New York 18	John H. Ketcham	Republican	1896	Incumbent re-elected.	▌ ✓ John H. Ketcham (Republican) 96.4%; ▌ Lester Howard (Prohibition) 3.6%
New York 19	Aaron Van Schaick Cochrane	Republican	1896	Incumbent retired. Republican hold.	▌ ✓ William Henry Draper (Republican) 56.3%; ▌ Edward F. McCormick (Democratic) 41.9%; ▌ George R. Percey (Prohibition) 1.3%; ▌ Frank E. Parsons (Socialist Labor) 0.5%
New York 20	Martin H. Glynn	Democratic	1898	Incumbent lost re-election. Republican gain.	▌ ✓ George N. Southwick (Republican) 52.3%; ▌ Martin H. Glynn (Democratic) 46.5%; ▌ George H. Stevenson (Socialist Labor) 0.6%; ▌ William H. Goddard (Prohibition) 0.6%
New York 21	John Knox Stewart	Republican	1898	Incumbent re-elected.	▌ ✓ John Knox Stewart (Republican) 53.2%; ▌ Joseph B. Handy (Democratic) 44.3%; ▌ Henry Smith (Prohibition) 1.8%; ▌ Peter C. Jepsen (Socialist Labor) 0.7%
New York 22	Lucius Littauer	Republican	1896	Incumbent re-elected.	▌ ✓ Lucius Littauer (Republican) 64.5%; ▌ William L. Pert (Democratic) 32.0%; ▌ Charles W. McClair (Prohibition) 3.0%; ▌ Frederick B. Stowe (Socialist Labor) 0.5%
New York 23	Louis W. Emerson	Republican	1898	Incumbent re-elected.	▌ ✓ Louis W. Emerson (Republican) 65.7%; ▌ Charles A. Burke (Democratic) 32.1%; ▌ Watson H. Harwood (Prohibition) 2.2%
New York 24	Charles A. Chickering	Republican	1892	Incumbent died. Winner also elected to finish term. Republican hold.	▌ ✓ Albert D. Shaw (Republican) 60.8%; ▌ James S. Boyer (Democratic) 36.5%; ▌ Smith H. Barlow (Prohibition) 2.7%
New York 25	James S. Sherman	Republican	1892	Incumbent re-elected.	▌ ✓ James S. Sherman (Republican) 57.5%; ▌ Henry Martin (Democratic) 40.5%; ▌ Frank L. Jones (Prohibition) 2.0%
New York 26	George W. Ray	Republican	1890	Incumbent re-elected.	▌ ✓ George W. Ray (Republican) 58.0%; ▌ Myron B. Ferris (Democratic) 38.2%; ▌ Charles W. Loomis (Prohibition) 3.8%
New York 27	Michael E. Driscoll	Republican	1898	Incumbent re-elected.	▌ ✓ Michael E. Driscoll (Republican) 62.2%; ▌ Luke McHenry (Democratic) 35.6%; ▌ Thomas Crimmins (Social Democratic) 2.2%
New York 28	Sereno E. Payne	Republican	1889	Incumbent re-elected.	▌ ✓ Sereno E. Payne (Republican) 59.2%; ▌ Robert L. Drummond (Democratic) 37.9%; ▌ Delos J. Cotton (Prohibition) 2.5%; ▌ J. Merton Rose (Socialist Labor) 0.4%
New York 29	Charles W. Gillet	Republican	1892	Incumbent re-elected.	▌ ✓ Charles W. Gillet (Republican) 52.4%; ▌ Frank J. Nelson (Democratic) 44.2%; ▌ Alphonso A. Hopkins (Prohibition) 3.4%
New York 30	James W. Wadsworth	Republican	1890	Incumbent re-elected.	▌ ✓ James W. Wadsworth (Republican) 56.1%; ▌ Charles Ward (Democratic) 40.5%; ▌ Edward O. Banister (Prohibition) 3.4%
New York 31	James M. E. O'Grady	Republican	1898	Incumbent retired. Republican hold.	▌ ✓ James Breck Perkins (Republican) 53.6%; ▌ Martin S. Mindnich (Democratic) 41.1%; ▌ William E. DeCeu (Prohibition) 2.2%; ▌ Richard Kitchelt (Social Democratic) 2.1%; ▌ Michael Sheehan (Socialist Labor) 1.0%
New York 32	William H. Ryan	Democratic	1898	Incumbent re-elected.	▌ ✓ William H. Ryan ((Democratic) 49.6%; ▌ Rowland B. Mahany (Republican) 48.7%; ▌ Boris Bornstein (Socialist Labor) 1.7%
New York 33	De Alva S. Alexander	Republican	1896	Incumbent re-elected.	▌ ✓ De Alva S. Alexander (Republican) 59.5%; ▌ Harvey W. Richardson (Democratic) 39.9%; ▌ William Stewart (Socialist Labor) 0.6%
New York 34	Edward B. Vreeland	Republican	1899	Incumbent re-elected.	▌ ✓ Edward B. Vreeland (Republican) 63.7%; ▌ Stillman E. Lewis (Democratic) 32.6%; ▌ John Nicholson (Prohibition) 3.7%

== North Carolina ==
District	Incumbent			This race	
District	Member	Party	First elected	Results	Candidates
North Carolina 1	John H. Small	Democratic	1898	Incumbent re-elected.	▌ ✓ John H. Small (Democratic) 57.4%; ▌ Abner Alexander (Republican) 29.1%; ▌ Isaac Melson Meekins (Independent Republican) 13.4%; ▌ James R. Elks (Prohibition) 0.1%
North Carolina 2	George Henry White	Republican	1896	Incumbent retired. Democratic gain.	▌ ✓ Claude Kitchin (Democratic) 64.6%; ▌ Joseph John Martin (Republican) 35.3%; ▌ John T. Kendal (Prohibition) 0.1%
North Carolina 3	Charles R. Thomas	Democratic	1898	Incumbent re-elected.	▌ ✓ Charles R. Thomas (Democratic) 53.8%; ▌ John Edgar Fowler (Populist) 46.2%; ▌ E.L. Parker (Prohibition) 0.1%
North Carolina 4	John W. Atwater	Independent Populist	1898	Incumbent retired. Democratic gain.	▌ ✓ Edward W. Pou (Democratic) 57.1%; ▌ Jesse A. Giles (Republican) 39.4%; ▌ J. J. Jenkins (Populist) 3.3%; ▌ James M. Templeton (Prohibition) 0.2%
North Carolina 5	William Walton Kitchin	Democratic	1896	Incumbent re-elected.	▌ ✓ William Walton Kitchin (Democratic) 52.5%; ▌ John R. Joyce (Republican) 47.3%; ▌ William H. Rodgers (Prohibition) 0.1%; ▌ J. T. B. Hoover (Populist) 0.1%
North Carolina 6	John D. Bellamy	Democratic	1898	Incumbent re-elected.	▌ ✓ John D. Bellamy (Democratic) 72.5%; ▌ Oliver H. Dockery (Republican) 27.4%; ▌ Richard H. Morse (Prohibition) 0.1%
North Carolina 7	Theodore F. Kluttz	Democratic	1898	Incumbent re-elected.	▌ ✓ Theodore F. Kluttz (Democratic) 52.3%; ▌ John Q. Holton (Republican) 44.5%; ▌ A. C. Shuford (Populist) 2.5%; ▌ William H. Moffett (Prohibition) 0.7%
North Carolina 8	Romulus Z. Linney	Republican	1894	Incumbent retired. Republican hold.	▌ ✓ E. Spencer Blackburn (Republican) 52.3%; ▌ John C. Buxton (Democratic) 47.4%; ▌ William J. Allin (Prohibition) 0.2%; ▌ J. B. Fortune (Independent Republican) 0.1%
North Carolina 9	Richmond Pearson	Republican	1894	Incumbent retired. Republican hold.	▌ ✓ James M. Moody (Republican) 52.8%; ▌ William T. Crawford (Democratic) 47.1%; ▌ Samuel H. Keller (Prohibition) 0.1%

== North Dakota ==
District	Incumbent			This race	
District	Member	Party	First elected	Results	Candidates
North Dakota at-large	Burleigh F. Spalding	Republican	1898	Incumbent retired. Republican hold.	▌ ✓ Thomas F. Marshall (Republican) 61.01%; ▌M. A. Hildreth (Democratic) 37.03%; ▌Charles H. Mott (Prohibition) 1.02%; Others: ▌J. C. Charest (Social Democratic) 0.72%; ▌Martin S. Blair (Populist) 0.21%

== Ohio ==
District	Incumbent			This race	
District	Member	Party	First elected	Results	Candidates
Ohio 1	William B. Shattuc	Republican	1896	Incumbent re-elected.	▌ ✓ William B. Shattuc (Republican) 58.2%; ▌ John B. Peaslee (Democratic) 40.6%; ▌ John T. Jones (Social Democratic) 0.6%; ▌ John Robertson (Prohibition) 0.3%; ▌ Jacob E. Reed (Union Reform) 0.2%; ▌ Thomas T. Markland (Populist) 0.1%
Ohio 2	Jacob H. Bromwell	Republican	1894	Incumbent re-elected.	▌ ✓ Jacob H. Bromwell (Republican) 54.3%; ▌ Henry Ketter (Democratic) 44.3%; ▌ Walter E. Richards (Social Democratic) 0.8%; ▌ E. P. Tingley (Prohibition) 0.3%; ▌ John B. Tekulve (Union Reform) 0.2%; ▌ John F. Nagel (Populist) 0.1%
Ohio 3	John Lewis Brenner	Democratic	1896	Incumbent lost renomination. Republican gain.	▌ ✓ Robert M. Nevin (Republican) 49.5%; ▌ Ulysses F. Bickley (Democratic) 49.2%; ▌ Edwin L. Rogers (Social Democratic) 0.6%; ▌ H. A. Thompson (Union Reform) 0.3%; ▌ Leonard Herzog (Socialist Labor) 0.3%; ▌ J. M. Becker (Populist) 0.1%
Ohio 4	Robert B. Gordon	Democratic	1898	Incumbent re-elected.	▌ ✓ Robert B. Gordon (Democratic) 59.9%; ▌ Edwin C. Wright (Republican) 40.1%
Ohio 5	David Meekison	Democratic	1896	Incumbent retired. Democratic hold.	▌ ✓ John S. Snook (Democratic) 54.4%; ▌ Frederick L. Hay (Republican) 45.6%
Ohio 6	Seth W. Brown	Republican	1896	Incumbent retired. Republican hold.	▌ ✓ Charles Q. Hildebrant (Republican) 54.2%; ▌ Adam Bridge (Democratic) 45.0%; ▌ Walter S. Rudisill (Union Reform) 0.8%
Ohio 7	Walter L. Weaver	Republican	1896	Incumbent lost renomination. Republican hold.	▌ ✓ Thomas B. Kyle (Republican) 54.7%; ▌ Stewart L. Tatum (Democratic) 44.8%; ▌ Charles D. Hays (Union Reform) 0.5%
Ohio 8	Archibald Lybrand	Republican	1896	Incumbent lost renomination. Republican hold.	▌ ✓ William R. Warnock (Republican) 54.4%; ▌ William J. Frey (Democratic) 45.0%; ▌ Harry A. Rightmire (Union Reform) 0.6%
Ohio 9	James H. Southard	Republican	1894	Incumbent re-elected.	▌ ✓ James H. Southard (Republican) 51.6%; ▌ Negley D. Cochran (Democratic) 46.6%; ▌ Byron A. Case (Social Democratic) 1.8%
Ohio 10	Stephen Morgan	Republican	1898	Incumbent re-elected.	▌ ✓ Stephen Morgan (Republican) 60.2%; ▌ James K. McClung (Democratic) 39.8%
Ohio 11	Charles H. Grosvenor	Republican	1892	Incumbent re-elected.	▌ ✓ Charles H. Grosvenor (Republican) 57.8%; ▌ Thomas H. Craig (Democratic) 41.7%; ▌ G. W. Dollison (Union Reform) 0.5%
Ohio 12	John J. Lentz	Democratic	1896	Incumbent lost re-election. Republican gain.	▌ ✓ Emmett Tompkins (Republican) 49.5%; ▌ John J. Lentz (Democratic) 49.5%; ▌ John S. Wilkins (Prohibition) 0.7%; ▌ George F. Ebner (Union Reform) 0.2%; ▌ Charles C. Pomeroy (Socialist Labor) 0.1%
Ohio 13	James A. Norton	Democratic	1896	Incumbent re-elected.	▌ ✓ James A. Norton (Democratic) 56.1%; ▌ Daniel W. Locke (Republican) 43.6%; ▌ C. W. Storer (Union Reform) 0.3%
Ohio 14	Winfield S. Kerr	Republican	1894	Incumbent lost renomination. Republican hold.	▌ ✓ William W. Skiles (Republican) 52.6%; ▌ William G. Sharp (Democratic) 47.4%
Ohio 15	H. Clay Van Voorhis	Republican	1892	Incumbent re-elected.	▌ ✓ H. Clay Van Voorhis (Republican) 51.3%; ▌ L. W. Ellenwood (Democratic) 48.6%; ▌ A. R. Pickens (Union Reform) 0.1%
Ohio 16	Joseph J. Gill	Republican	1899	Incumbent re-elected.	▌ ✓ Joseph J. Gill (Republican) 56.0%; ▌ Marion Huffman (Democratic) 44.0%
Ohio 17	John A. McDowell	Democratic	1896	Incumbent lost renomination. Democratic hold.	▌ ✓ John W. Cassingham (Democratic) 55.0%; ▌ George Adams (Republican) 44.5%; ▌ Thomas N. Madden (Union Reform) 0.5%
Ohio 18	Robert Walker Tayler	Republican	1894	Incumbent re-elected.	▌ ✓ Robert Walker Tayler (Republican) 54.6%; ▌ John H. Morris (Democratic) 43.4%; ▌ Charles F. Bough (Prohibition) 1.6%; ▌ Henry O. Bucklin (Socialist Labor) 0.3%; ▌ Alvin C. Van Dyke (Union Reform) 0.1%
Ohio 19	Charles W. F. Dick	Republican	1898	Incumbent re-elected.	▌ ✓ Charles W. F. Dick (Republican) 62.4%; ▌ Charles E. Chadman (Democratic) 37.2%; ▌ Warren Cook (Union Reform) 0.4%
Ohio 20	Fremont O. Phillips	Republican	1898	Incumbent lost renomination and lost re-election as an Independent Republican. Republican hold.	▌ ✓ Jacob A. Beidler (Republican) 45.8%; ▌ H. B. Harrington (Democratic) 44.4%; ▌ Fremont O. Phillips (Ind. Republican) 8.0%; ▌ Thomas H. Madden (Social Democratic) 0.7%; ▌ John Kircher (Socialist Labor) 0.6%; ▌ John C. Hardenbergh (Union Reform) 0.2%; ▌ William B. Gould (Ind. Republican) 0.1%
Ohio 21	Theodore E. Burton	Republican	1894	Incumbent re-elected.	▌ ✓ Theodore E. Burton (Republican) 55.1%; ▌ Sylvester V. McMahon (Democratic) 42.3%; ▌ Max S. Hayes (Social Democratic) 1.0%; ▌ Paul Dinger (Socialist Labor) 0.7%; ▌ Albert L. Talcott (Prohibition) 0.6%; ▌ George H. Lyttle (Union Reform) 0.3%

== Oregon ==
District	Incumbent			This race	
District	Member	Party	First elected	Results	Candidates
Oregon 1	Thomas H. Tongue	Republican	1896	Incumbent re-elected.	▌ ✓ Thomas H. Tongue (Republican) 49.48%; ▌Bernard Daly (Fusion) 42.44%; ▌W. P. Elmore (Prohibition) 4.14%; ▌James K. Sears (Populist) 3.94%
Oregon 2	Malcolm A. Moody	Republican	1898	Incumbent re-elected.	▌ ✓ Malcolm A. Moody (Republican) 55.11%; ▌William Smith (Fusion) 31.71%; ▌J. E. Simmons (Ind. Democratic) 8.44%; ▌Leslie Butler (Prohibition) 4.74%

== Pennsylvania ==
District	Incumbent			This race	
District	Member	Party	First elected	Results	Candidates
Pennsylvania 1	Henry H. Bingham	Republican	1878	Incumbent re-elected.	▌ ✓ Henry H. Bingham (Republican) 71.5%; ▌ Michael Francis Doyle (Democratic) 28.1%; ▌ Isaac A. Ramsey (Prohibition) 0.4%
Pennsylvania 2	Robert Adams Jr.	Republican	1893	Incumbent re-elected.	▌ ✓ Robert Adams Jr. (Republican) 79.7%; ▌ William E. Hooper (Democratic) 20.3%
Pennsylvania 3	William McAleer	Democratic	1896	Incumbent lost re-election. Republican gain.	▌ ✓ Henry Burk (Republican) 52.7%; ▌ William McAleer (Democratic) 46.7%; ▌ J. E. Frost (Social Democratic) 0.4%; ▌ Edward W. Marsh (Prohibition) 0.2%
Pennsylvania 4	James R. Young	Republican	1896	Incumbent re-elected.	▌ ✓ James R. Young (Republican) 75.5%; ▌ Peter J. Hughes (Democratic) 23.5%; ▌ Lewis L. Eavenson (Prohibition) 1.0%
Pennsylvania 5	Alfred C. Harmer	Republican	1876	Incumbent died. Republican hold.	▌ ✓ Edward de Veaux Morrell (Republican) 75.7%; ▌ Samuel R. Carter (Democratic) 23.3%; ▌ L. A. Benson (Prohibition) 1.0%
Pennsylvania 6	Thomas S. Butler	Republican	1896	Incumbent re-elected.	▌ ✓ Thomas S. Butler (Republican) 70.2%; ▌ Nathaniel M. Ellis (Democratic) 26.9%; ▌ J. Newton Huston (Prohibition) 2.7%; ▌ M. E. Shields (Independent) 0.3%
Pennsylvania 7	Irving P. Wanger	Republican	1892	Incumbent re-elected.	▌ ✓ Irving P. Wanger (Republican) 57.1%; ▌ Christopher Van Artsdalen (Democratic) 41.7%; ▌ John McKinlay (Prohibition) 1.2%
Pennsylvania 8	Laird Howard Barber	Democratic	1898	Incumbent retired. Democratic hold.	▌ ✓ Howard Mutchler (Democratic) 51.3%; ▌ Russell C. Stewart (Republican) 46.6%; ▌ Edward E. Dixon (Prohibition) 2.1%
Pennsylvania 9	Henry D. Green	Democratic	1899	Incumbent re-elected.	▌ ✓ Henry D. Green (Democratic) 55.9%; ▌ William Kerper Stevens (Republican) 43.6%; ▌ Isaac P. Merkel (Social Democratic) 0.5%
Pennsylvania 10	Marriott Brosius	Republican	1888	Incumbent re-elected.	▌ ✓ Marriott Brosius (Republican) 71.8%; ▌ Louis N. Spencer (Democratic) 26.4%; ▌ Daniel Von Neida (Prohibition) 1.8%
Pennsylvania 11	William Connell	Republican	1896	Incumbent re-elected.	▌ ✓ William Connell (Republican) 49.5%; ▌ Michael F. Conry (Democratic) 43.3%; ▌ F. M. Spencer (Independent) 4.4%; ▌ William H Richmond (Prohibition) 2.4%; ▌ Jonas Šliūpas (Socialist Labor) 0.3%
Pennsylvania 12	Stanley W. Davenport	Democratic	1898	Incumbent lost re-election. Republican gain.	▌ ✓ Henry W. Palmer (Republican) 54.3%; ▌ Stanley W. Davenport (Democratic/Anti-Trust) 39.3%; ▌ Henry C. Purnell (Workingmen's) 3.1%; ▌ Samuel H. Houser (Prohibition) 2.2%; ▌ J. H. Hand (Socialist Labor) 1.1%
Pennsylvania 13	James W. Ryan	Democratic	1898	Incumbent lost re-election. Republican gain.	▌ ✓ George R. Patterson (Republican) 52.4%; ▌ James W. Ryan (Democratic) 46.9%; ▌ John P. Schwenk (Prohibition) 0.7%
Pennsylvania 14	Marlin E. Olmsted	Republican	1896	Incumbent re-elected.	▌ ✓ Marlin E. Olmsted (Republican) 89.5%; ▌ Edwin H. Molly (Prohibition) 5.5%; ▌ Benjamin L. Forster (Democratic) 5.0%
Pennsylvania 15	Charles Frederick Wright	Republican	1898	Incumbent re-elected.	▌ ✓ Charles Frederick Wright (Republican) 56.7%; ▌ William B. Packard (Democratic) 38.5%; ▌ Leon Judson Reynolds (Prohibition) 4.7%; ▌ S. F. Lane (Populist) 0.1%
Pennsylvania 16	Horace B. Packer	Republican	1896	Incumbent retired. Republican hold.	▌ ✓ Elias Deemer (Republican) 52.6%; ▌ Otto G. Kaupp (Democratic) 43.8%; ▌ William W. Sholl (Prohibition) 3.6%
Pennsylvania 17	Rufus K. Polk	Democratic	1898	Incumbent re-elected.	▌ ✓ Rufus K. Polk (Democratic) 54.3%; ▌ Clarence F. Huth (Republican) 42.7%; ▌ Samuel W. Murray (Prohibition) 3.0%
Pennsylvania 18	Thaddeus M. Mahon	Republican	1892	Incumbent re-elected.	▌ ✓ Thaddeus M. Mahon (Republican) 58.9%; ▌ James G. Heading (Democratic) 41.1%
Pennsylvania 19	Edward D. Ziegler	Democratic	1898	Incumbent lost renomination. Republican gain.	▌ ✓ Robert Jacob Lewis (Republican) 50.3%; ▌ Harry N. Gitt (Democratic) 48.1%; ▌ A. Foster Mullin (Prohibition) 1.6%
Pennsylvania 20	Joseph E. Thropp	Republican	1898	Incumbent lost renomination. Republican hold.	▌ ✓ Alvin Evans (Republican) 62.5%; ▌ James M. Walters (Democratic) 35.4%; ▌ John Clark (Prohibition) 1.9%; ▌ Walter Rowley (Socialist Labor) 0.2%
Pennsylvania 21	Summers M. Jack	Republican	1898	Incumbent re-elected.	▌ ✓ Summers M. Jack (Republican) 61.6%; ▌ Curtis H. Gregg (Democratic) 35.9%; ▌ Solomon Shaffer (Prohibition) 2.5%
Pennsylvania 22	John Dalzell	Republican	1886	Incumbent re-elected.	▌ ✓ John Dalzell (Republican) 69.7%; ▌ John F. Miller (Democratic) 27.5%; ▌ J. T. McCrory (Prohibition) 1.6%; ▌ Charles Rupp (Socialist Labor) 1.2%
Pennsylvania 23	William H. Graham	Republican	1898	Incumbent re-elected.	▌ ✓ William H. Graham (Republican) 74.6%; ▌ John Huckenstine (Democratic) 23.0%; ▌ O. L. Miller (Prohibition) 1.6%; ▌ William E. Hunt (Socialist Labor) 0.8%
Pennsylvania 24	Ernest F. Acheson	Republican	1894	Incumbent re-elected.	▌ ✓ Ernest F. Acheson (Republican) 58.7%; ▌ Wooda N. Carr (Democratic) 38.5%; ▌ Benjamin A. Bubbett (Prohibition) 2.2%; ▌ William H. Thomas (Socialist Labor) 0.6%
Pennsylvania 25	Joseph B. Showalter	Republican	1897	Incumbent re-elected.	▌ ✓ Joseph B. Showalter (Republican) 55.5%; ▌ Marcus L. Lockwood (Democratic/Prohibition) 44.5%
Pennsylvania 26	Athelston Gaston	Democratic	1898	Incumbent lost re-election. Republican gain.	▌ ✓ Arthur L. Bates (Republican) 53.6%; ▌ Athelston Gaston (Democratic) 42.7%; ▌ Isaac Monderall (Prohibition) 2.8%; ▌ Charles Heydrick (Social Democratic) 0.6%; ▌ A. Black (Socialist Labor) 0.3%
Pennsylvania 27	Joseph C. Sibley	Democratic	1898	Incumbent re-elected as a Republican candidate. Republican gain.	▌ ✓ Joseph C. Sibley (Republican) 50.8%; ▌ Lewis Emery Jr. (Lincoln Rep. / Democratic) 44.7%; ▌ H.B. Milward (Prohibition) 4.4%
Pennsylvania 28	James Knox Polk Hall	Democratic	1898	Incumbent re-elected.	▌ ✓ James Knox Polk Hall (Democratic) 49.5%; ▌ Alfred A. Clearwater (Republican) 47.9%; ▌ Lucien Bird (Prohibition) 2.2%; ▌ J. Critchley (Socialist Labor) 0.3%
Pennsylvania at-large 2 seats on a general ticket.	Galusha A. Grow	Republican	1894	Incumbent re-elected.	▌ ✓ Galusha A. Grow (Republican) 30.5%; ▌ ✓ Robert H. Foerderer (Republican) 30.1%; ▌ Harry E. Grim (Democratic) 18.3%; ▌ Nicholas M. Edwards (Democratic) 18.3%; ▌ William W. Hague (Prohibition) 1.1%; ▌ Lee L. Grumbine (Prohibition) 1.1%; ▌ John W. Slayton (Social Democratic) 0.2%; ▌ Edward Kuppinger (Social Democratic) 0.2%; ▌ John R. Root (Socialist Labor) 0.1%; ▌ Donald L. Monro (Socialist Labor) 0.1%; ▌ Robert Bringham (Populist) 0.03%; ▌ George Main (Populist) 0.03%; ▌ Benjamin A. Bubbett (Independent) 0.01%
Pennsylvania at-large 2 seats on a general ticket.	Samuel A. Davenport	Republican	1896	Incumbent retired. Republican hold.	

== Rhode Island ==
District	Incumbent			This race	
District	Member	Party	First elected	Results	Candidates
Rhode Island 1	Melville Bull	Republican	1894	Incumbent re-elected.	▌ ✓ Melville Bull (Republican) 59.5%; ▌ Charles E. Gorman (Democratic) 34.0%; ▌ James P. Reid (Socialist Labor) 3.4%; ▌ William E. Brightman (Prohibition) 3.1%
Rhode Island 2	Adin B. Capron	Republican	1896	Incumbent re-elected.	▌ ✓ Adin B. Capron (Republican) 57.8%; ▌ Lucius F. C. Garvin (Democratic) 36.7%; ▌ Bernon E. Helme (Prohibition) 3.2%; ▌ Herbert Longworthy (Socialist Labor) 2.3%

== South Carolina ==
District	Incumbent			This race	
District	Member	Party	First elected	Results	Candidates
South Carolina 1	William Elliott	Democratic	1886; 1890 (lost contest); 1890; 1892 (retired); 1894; 1896 (lost contest); 1896	Incumbent re-elected.	▌ ✓ William Elliott (Democratic) 72.7%; ▌W. W. Beckett (Republican) 27.3%
South Carolina 2	W. Jasper Talbert	Democratic	1892	Incumbent re-elected.	▌ ✓ W. Jasper Talbert (Democratic) 97.7%; ▌J. B. Odom (Republican) 2.3%
South Carolina 3	Asbury Latimer	Democratic	1892	Incumbent re-elected.	▌ ✓ Asbury Latimer (Democratic) 97.5%; ▌Anson C. Merrick (Republican) 2.5%
South Carolina 4	Stanyarne Wilson	Democratic	1894	Incumbent lost renomination. Democratic hold	▌ ✓ Joseph T. Johnson (Democratic) 97.0%; ▌S. T. Poinier (Republican) 3.0%
South Carolina 5	David E. Finley	Democratic	1898	Incumbent re-elected.	▌ ✓ David E. Finley (Democratic) 97.3%; ▌John F. Jones (Republican) 2.7%
South Carolina 6	James Norton	Democratic	1897 (special)	Incumbent lost renomination. Democratic hold	▌ ✓ Robert B. Scarborough (Democratic) 94.3%; ▌R. A. Stuart (Republican) 5.7%
South Carolina 7	J. William Stokes	Democratic	1894	Incumbent re-elected.	▌ ✓ J. William Stokes (Democratic) 93.2%; ▌Alexander D. Dantzler (Republican) 6.8%

== South Dakota ==
District	Incumbent			This race	
District	Member	Party	First elected	Results	Candidates
South Dakota at-large (2 seats elected on a general ticket)	Charles H. Burke	Republican	1898	Incumbent re-elected.	▌ ✓ Charles H. Burke (Republican) 28.06%; ▌ ✓ Eben Martin (Republican) 28.04%; ▌Andrew E. Lee (Fusion) 21.24%; ▌Joseph B. Moore (Fusion) 21.03%; Others: ▌O. A. Harpel (Prohibition) 0.69%; ▌M. Rogers (Prohibition) 0.62%; ▌Edmund F. English (Midroad-Populist) 0.16%; ▌John M. Pease (Midroad-Populist) 0.15%
South Dakota at-large (2 seats elected on a general ticket)	Robert J. Gamble	Republican	1898	Incumbent retired to run for U.S. senator. Republican hold.	▌ ✓ Charles H. Burke (Republican) 28.06%; ▌ ✓ Eben Martin (Republican) 28.04%; ▌Andrew E. Lee (Fusion) 21.24%; ▌Joseph B. Moore (Fusion) 21.03%; Others: ▌O. A. Harpel (Prohibition) 0.69%; ▌M. Rogers (Prohibition) 0.62%; ▌Edmund F. English (Midroad-Populist) 0.16%; ▌John M. Pease (Midroad-Populist) 0.15%

== Tennessee ==
District	Incumbent			This race	
District	Member	Party	First elected	Results	Candidates
Tennessee 1	Walter P. Brownlow	Republican	1896	Incumbent re-elected.	▌ ✓ Walter P. Brownlow (Republican) 62.81%; ▌E. C. Reeves (Democratic) 36.80%; ▌R. H. Garrett (Prohibition) 0.39%
Tennessee 2	Henry R. Gibson	Republican	1894	Incumbent re-elected.	▌ ✓ Henry R. Gibson (Republican) 68.74%; ▌W. F. Park (Democratic) 30.89%; ▌W. H. Henry (Prohibition) 0.37%
Tennessee 3	John A. Moon	Democratic	1896	Incumbent re-elected.	▌ ✓ John A. Moon (Democratic) 52.07%; ▌Robert S. Sharp (Republican) 47.05%; ▌W. A. Wetmore (Prohibition) 0.88%
Tennessee 4	Charles E. Snodgrass	Democratic	1898	Incumbent re-elected.	▌ ✓ Charles E. Snodgrass (Democratic) 59.76%; ▌J. J. Gore (Republican) 40.24%
Tennessee 5	James D. Richardson	Democratic	1884	Incumbent re-elected.	▌ ✓ James D. Richardson (Democratic) 68.00%; ▌A. V. McClain (Republican) 32.00%
Tennessee 6	John W. Gaines	Democratic	1896	Incumbent re-elected.	▌ ✓ John W. Gaines (Democratic) 71.90%; ▌Lee Brock (Republican) 26.17%; ▌N. N. Anderson (Independent) 1.67%; ▌Jonathan Stenser (Unknown) 0.26%
Tennessee 7	Nicholas N. Cox	Democratic	1890	Incumbent retired. Democratic hold.	▌ ✓ Lemuel P. Padgett (Democratic) 54.36%; ▌Joseph H. Fuzzell (Independent) 45.64%
Tennessee 8	Thetus W. Sims	Democratic	1896	Incumbent re-elected.	▌ ✓ Thetus W. Sims (Democratic) 53.08%; ▌Samuel W. Hawkins (Republican) 44.84%; ▌J. H. Mitchell (Prohibition) 1.48%; Others: ▌Benjamin A. Enloe (Democratic) 0.32%; ▌E. J. Timberlake (Prohibition) 0.28%
Tennessee 9	Rice A. Pierce	Democratic	1896	Incumbent re-elected.	▌ ✓ Rice A. Pierce (Democratic) 71.79%; ▌H. E. Austin (Republican) 26.04%; ▌George W. Bennett (Prohibition) 1.94%; ▌D. F. Taylor (Social Democratic) 0.23%
Tennessee 10	Edward W. Carmack	Democratic	1896	Incumbent retired to run for U.S. senator. Democratic hold.	▌ ✓ Malcolm R. Patterson (Democratic) 64.23%; ▌Zachary Taylor (Republican) 35.77%

== Texas ==
District	Incumbent			This race	
District	Member	Party	First elected	Results	Candidates
Texas 1	Thomas H. Ball	Democratic	1896	Incumbent re-elected.	▌ ✓ Thomas H. Ball (Democratic) 65.7%; ▌ S. E. Tracy (Republican) 29.8%; ▌ S. E. Traylor (Prohibition) 4.5%
Texas 2	Samuel B. Cooper	Democratic	1892	Incumbent re-elected.	▌ ✓ Samuel B. Cooper (Democratic) 98.5%; ▌ J. B. Wallace (Social Democratic) 1.5%
Texas 3	Reese C. De Graffenreid	Democratic	1896	Incumbent re-elected.	▌ ✓ Reese C. De Graffenreid (Democratic) 61.0%; ▌ C. G. White (Republican) 39.0%
Texas 4	John L. Sheppard	Democratic	1898	Incumbent re-elected.	▌ ✓ John L. Sheppard (Democratic) 57.6%; ▌ J. C. Gibbons (Republican) 32.1%; ▌ James L. Darwin (Populist) 10.3%
Texas 5	Joseph W. Bailey	Democratic	1890	Incumbent retired to run for US Senator. Democratic hold.	▌ ✓ Choice B. Randell (Democratic) 90.4%; ▌ J. W. Thomas (Republican) 5.8%; ▌ S. J. Hampton (Social Democratic) 3.8%
Texas 6	Robert E. Burke	Democratic	1896	Incumbent re-elected.	▌ ✓ Robert E. Burke (Democratic) 77.7%; ▌ S. H. Lumpkin (Populist) 17.4%; ▌ O. F. Dombhager (Republican) 3.6%; ▌ A. N. Cochran (Independent) 1.4%
Texas 7	Robert L. Henry	Democratic	1896	Incumbent re-elected.	▌ ✓ Robert L. Henry (Democratic) 92.1%; ▌ Willis L. Harrison (Populist) 4.4%; ▌ J. E. Boynton (Republican) 3.6%
Texas 8	S. W. T. Lanham	Democratic	1896	Incumbent re-elected.	▌ ✓ S. W. T. Lanham (Democratic) 68.2%; ▌ James S. Daley (Populist) 18.3%; ▌ N. A. Dodge (Republican) 13.5%
Texas 9	Albert S. Burleson	Democratic	1898	Incumbent re-elected.	▌ ✓ Albert S. Burleson (Democratic) 91.3%; ▌ Nathaniel Q. Henderson (Republican) 8.7%
Texas 10	Robert B. Hawley	Republican	1896	Incumbent retired. Democratic gain.	▌ ✓ George F. Burgess (Democratic) 59.5%; ▌ Walter C. Jones (Republican) 40.1%
Texas 11	Rudolph Kleberg	Democratic	1896	Incumbent re-elected.	▌ ✓ Rudolph Kleberg (Democratic) 59.2%; ▌ B. L. Crouch (Republican) 40.8%
Texas 12	James Luther Slayden	Democratic	1896	Incumbent re-elected.	▌ ✓ James Luther Slayden (Democratic) 60.8%; ▌ C. C. Drake (Republican) 38.1%
Texas 13	John H. Stephens	Democratic	1896	Incumbent re-elected	▌ ✓ John H. Stephens (Democratic) 85.1%; ▌ C. W. Johnson (Republican) 14.8%

== Utah ==
District	Incumbent			This race	
District	Member	Party	First elected	Results	Candidates
Utah at-large	William H. King	Democratic	1900 (special)	Incumbent lost re-election. Republican gain.	▌ ✓ George Sutherland (Republican) 49.75%; ▌William H. King (Democratic) 49.49%; Others: ▌A. B. Edler (Social Democratic) 0.68%; ▌D. F. Porter (Socialist Labor) 0.09%

== Vermont ==
District	Incumbent			This race	
District	Member	Party	First elected	Results	Candidates
Vermont 1	H. Henry Powers	Republican	1890	Incumbent lost renomination. Republican hold.	▌ ✓ David J. Foster (Republican) 68.5%; ▌Ozro Meacham (Democratic) 28.3%; ▌Henry M. Seely (Prohibition) 2.4%
Vermont 2	William W. Grout	Republican	1880; 1882 (lost); 1884	Incumbent retired. Republican hold.	▌ ✓ Kittredge Haskins (Republican) 75.7%; ▌George T. Swasey (Democratic) 23.5%; ▌John B. Anderson (Prohibition) 0.7%

== Virginia ==
District	Incumbent			This race	
District	Member	Party	First elected	Results	Candidates
Virginia 1	William A. Jones	Democratic	1890	Incumbent re-elected.	▌ ✓ William A. Jones (Democratic) 64.1%; ▌James M. Stubbs (Republican) 34.9%; ▌H. L. Crockett (Prohibition) 1.0%
Virginia 2	Richard A. Wise	Republican	1896 (contest); 1898 (contest)	Incumbent lost re-election. Democratic gain.	▌ ✓ Harry L. Maynard (Democratic) 62.2%; ▌Richard A. Wise (Republican) 31.6%; ▌James B. Flynn (Socialist Labor) 3.3%; ▌C. C. Williams (Labor) 3.3%
Virginia 3	John Lamb	Democratic	1896	Incumbent re-elected.	▌ ✓ John Lamb (Democratic) 65.6%; ▌Edgar Allen (Republican) 33.5%; ▌John Laub (Unknown) 0.9%
Virginia 4	Francis R. Lassiter	Democratic	1900 (special)	Incumbent re-elected.	▌ ✓ Francis R. Lassiter (Democratic) 57.5%; ▌C. E. Wilson (Republican) 39.9%
Virginia 5	Claude A. Swanson	Democratic	1892	Incumbent re-elected.	▌ ✓ Claude A. Swanson (Democratic) 58.1%; ▌John R. Whitehead (Republican) 41.9%
Virginia 6	Peter J. Otey	Democratic	1894	Incumbent re-elected.	▌ ✓ Peter J. Otey (Democratic) 77.5%; ▌J. B. Stovall Jr. (Republican) 12.0%; ▌A. E. Fairweather (Prohibition) 10.5%
Virginia 7	James Hay	Democratic	1896	Incumbent re-elected.	▌ ✓ James Hay (Democratic) 63.3%; ▌C. M. Gibbens (Republican) 36.7%
Virginia 8	John Franklin Rixey	Democratic	1896	Incumbent re-elected.	▌ ✓ John Franklin Rixey (Democratic) 64.2%; ▌William J. Rogers (Republican) 35.8%
Virginia 9	William F. Rhea	Democratic	1898	Incumbent re-elected.	▌ ✓ William F. Rhea (Democratic) 52.3%; ▌James A. Walker (Republican) 47.7%
Virginia 10	Julian M. Quarles	Democratic	1898	Incumbent retired. Democratic hold.	▌ ✓ Henry D. Flood (Democratic) 54.3%; ▌Robert T. Hubard (Republican) 43.7%; Others: ▌R. S. Griffith (Prohibition) 1.6%; ▌Frank Smith (Independent) 0.3%

== Washington ==
District	Incumbent			This race	
District	Member	Party	First elected	Results	Candidates
Washington at-large (2 seats elected on a general ticket)	Wesley Livsey Jones	Republican	1898	Incumbent re-elected.	▌ ✓ Wesley Livsey Jones (Republican) 26.26%; ▌ ✓ Francis W. Cushman (Republican) 26.20%; ▌J. T. Ronald (Democratic) 21.54%; ▌F. C. Robertson (Democratic) 21.28%; Others: ▌Guy Posson (Prohibition) 1.06%; ▌J. A. Adams (Prohibition) 0.98%; ▌William Hogan (Social Democratic) 0.93%; ▌Hermon F. Titus (Social Democratic) 0.91%; ▌Walter Walker (Socialist Labor) 0.44%; ▌Christan F. Larsen (Socialist Labor) 0.42%
Washington at-large (2 seats elected on a general ticket)	Francis W. Cushman	Republican	1898	Incumbent re-elected.	▌ ✓ Wesley Livsey Jones (Republican) 26.26%; ▌ ✓ Francis W. Cushman (Republican) 26.20%; ▌J. T. Ronald (Democratic) 21.54%; ▌F. C. Robertson (Democratic) 21.28%; Others: ▌Guy Posson (Prohibition) 1.06%; ▌J. A. Adams (Prohibition) 0.98%; ▌William Hogan (Social Democratic) 0.93%; ▌Hermon F. Titus (Social Democratic) 0.91%; ▌Walter Walker (Socialist Labor) 0.44%; ▌Christan F. Larsen (Socialist Labor) 0.42%

== West Virginia ==
District	Incumbent			This race	
District	Member	Party	First elected	Results	Candidates
West Virginia 1	Blackburn B. Dovener	Republican	1894	Incumbent re-elected.	▌ ✓ Blackburn B. Dovener (Republican) 54.38%; ▌William E. Haymond (Democratic) 44.52%; ▌Goodloe Jackson (Prohibition) 1.00%; ▌[FNU] Johnson (Populist) 0.10%
West Virginia 2	Alston G. Dayton	Republican	1894	Incumbent re-elected.	▌ ✓ Alston G. Dayton (Republican) 51.93%; ▌Thomas B. Davis (Democratic) 47.46%; ▌Herbert Young (Prohibition) 0.62%
West Virginia 3	David E. Johnston	Democratic	1898	Incumbent lost re-election. Republican gain.	▌ ✓ Joseph H. Gaines (Republican) 55.28%; ▌David E. Johnston (Democratic) 44.66%; ▌John Kyle (Prohibition) 0.05%
West Virginia 4	Romeo H. Freer	Republican	1898	Incumbent retired to run for state attorney general. Republican hold.	▌ ✓ James A. Hughes (Republican) 53.44%; ▌Creed Collins (Democratic) 46.45%; Others: ▌W. H. Shaw (Prohibition) 0.10%; ▌[FNU] Turner (Populist) 0.01%

== Wisconsin ==
Wisconsin elected ten members of congress on Election Day, November 6, 1900.

District	Incumbent			This race	
District	Member	Party	First elected	Results	Candidates
Wisconsin 1	Henry Allen Cooper	Republican	1892	Incumbent re-elected.	▌ ✓ Henry Allen Cooper (Republican) 64.1%; ▌Gilbert T. Hodges (Democratic) 33.0%; ▌John R. Beveridge (Prohibition) 2.9%
Wisconsin 2	Herman Dahle	Republican	1898	Incumbent re-elected.	▌ ✓ Herman Dahle (Republican) 52.8%; ▌John A. Aylward (Democratic) 44.8%; ▌Lemuel T. Davies (Prohibition) 2.4%
Wisconsin 3	Joseph W. Babcock	Republican	1892	Incumbent re-elected.	▌ ✓ Joseph W. Babcock (Republican) 63.5%; ▌Edward L. Luckow (Democratic) 33.5%; ▌William J. Breeden (Prohibition) 3.0%
Wisconsin 4	Theobald Otjen	Republican	1894	Incumbent re-elected.	▌ ✓ Theobald Otjen (Republican) 49.5%; ▌George Wilbur Peck (Democratic) 43.5%; ▌Robert Meister (Social Dem.) 6.0%; ▌Edward W. Drake (Prohibition) 1.0%
Wisconsin 5	Samuel S. Barney	Republican	1894	Incumbent re-elected.	▌ ✓ Samuel S. Barney (Republican) 52.4%; ▌Charles H. Weisse (Democratic) 41.0%; ▌Henry C. Berger (Social Dem.) 5.2%; ▌Winfield D. Cox (Prohibition) 1.4%
Wisconsin 6	James H. Davidson	Republican	1896	Incumbent re-elected.	▌ ✓ James H. Davidson (Republican) 55.8%; ▌James W. Watson (Democratic) 41.9%; ▌Wesley Mott (Prohibition) 1.8%; ▌John Voss (Social Dem.) 0.5%
Wisconsin 7	John J. Esch	Republican	1898	Incumbent re-elected.	▌ ✓ John J. Esch (Republican) 65.2%; ▌John P. Rice (Democratic) 32.3%; ▌Charles L. Allen (Prohibition) 2.5%
Wisconsin 8	Edward S. Minor	Republican	1894	Incumbent re-elected.	▌ ✓ Edward S. Minor (Republican) 60.1%; ▌Nathan E. Morgan (Democratic) 39.9%
Wisconsin 9	Alexander Stewart	Republican	1894	Incumbent retired. Republican hold.	▌ ✓ Webster E. Brown (Republican) 64.7%; ▌Ernest Schweppe (Democratic) 33.0%; ▌John F. Scott (Prohibition) 2.3%
Wisconsin 10	John J. Jenkins	Republican	1894	Incumbent re-elected.	▌ ✓ John J. Jenkins (Republican) 68.7%; ▌Frank A. Partlow (Democratic) 28.1%; ▌Henry A. Russell (Prohibition) 3.2%

== Wyoming ==
District	Incumbent			This race	
District	Member	Party	First elected	Results	Candidates
Wyoming at-large	Frank W. Mondell	Republican	1898	Incumbent re-elected.	▌ ✓ Frank W. Mondell (Republican) 59.21%; ▌John C. Thompson (Democratic) 40.79%

== Non-voting delegates ==
=== Arizona Territory ===
District	Incumbent			This race	
District	Delegate	Party	First elected	Results	Candidates
Arizona Territory at-large	John F. Wilson	Democratic	1898	Incumbent lost renomination. Democratic hold.	▌ ✓ Marcus A. Smith (Democratic) 52.13%; ▌Oakes Murphy (Republican) 46.11%; ▌Davidson (Note: Full name unknown) (Prohibition) 1.76%

=== Hawaii Territory ===
District	Incumbent			This race	
District	Delegate	Party	First elected	Results	Candidates
Hawaii Territory at-large	None (New seat)			New seat. Home Rule gain.	▌ ✓ Robert William Wilcox (Home Rule) 42.75%; ▌Samuel Parker (Republican) 40.02%; ▌David Kawānanakoa (Democratic) 17.23%

=== New Mexico Territory ===
District	Incumbent			This race	
District	Delegate	Party	First elected	Results	Candidates
New Mexico Territory at-large	Pedro Perea	Republican	1898	Incumbent retired. Republican hold.	▌ ✓ Bernard S. Rodey (Republican); [data missing]

=== Oklahoma Territory ===
District	Incumbent			This race	
District	Delegate	Party	First elected	Results	Candidates
Oklahoma Territory at-large	Dennis T. Flynn	Republican	1892; 1894 (lost); 1898	Incumbent re-elected.	▌ ✓ Dennis T. Flynn (Republican) 52.14%; ▌Neff (Democratic) 45.70%; ▌Allan (Populist) 1.09%; ▌Tucker (Socialist) 1.08%

=== Puerto Rico ===
District	Incumbent			This race	
District	Delegate	Party	First elected	Results	Candidates
Puerto Rico at-large	None (New seat)			New seat. Republican gain.	▌ ✓ Federico Degetau (Republican); [data missing]

== See also ==
- 1900 United States elections
  - 1900 United States presidential election
  - 1900–01 United States Senate elections
- 56th United States Congress
- 57th United States Congress

== Bibliography ==
- Dubin, Michael J. (March 1, 1998). United States Congressional Elections, 1788-1997: The Official Results of the Elections of the 1st Through 105th Congresses. McFarland and Company. ISBN 978-0786402830.
- Martis, Kenneth C. (January 1, 1989). The Historical Atlas of Political Parties in the United States Congress, 1789-1989. Macmillan Publishing Company. ISBN 978-0029201701.
- Moore, John L., ed. (1994). Congressional Quarterly's Guide to U.S. Elections (Third ed.). Congressional Quarterly Inc. ISBN 978-0871879967.
- "Party Divisions of the House of Representatives* 1789–Present". Office of the Historian, United States House of Representatives.
- Secretary of State (1901). Maryland Manual 1900. Baltimore: Wm. J. C. Dulany Co.
