= Charles Little =

Charles Little may refer to:

- Charles Little (Royal Navy officer) (1882–1973)
- Charles Little (cricketer) (1870–1922), English cricketer
- Charles A. Little (1854–1920), American lawyer and politician
- Charles Coffin Little (1799–1869), American publisher
- Charles Herbert Little (1907–2004), Canadian Director of Naval Intelligence
- Charles Newton Little (1858–1923), American mathematician and civil engineer
