= General Little =

General Little may refer to:

- Charles A. Little (1854–1920), Maryland National Guard brigadier general
- Eric D. Little (fl. 1990s–2020s), U.S. Army brigadier general
- Lewis Henry Little (1817–1862), Confederate States Army brigadier general
- Louis M. Little (1878–1960), U.S. Marine Corps major general
- Malcolm Orme Little (1857–1931), British Army brigadier general

== See also ==
- Isaac Littell (1857–1924), U.S. Army brigadier general
- William Haines Lytle (1826–1863), Union Army brigadier general
- Attorney General Little (disambiguation)
