= Attorney General Little =

Attorney General Little may refer to:

- John Little (congressman) (1837–1900), Attorney General of Ohio
- Joseph Ignatius Little (1835–1902), Attorney General of Newfoundland
- Philip Francis Little (1824–1897), Attorney General of Newfoundland

== See also ==
- General Little (disambiguation)
