= William E. Williams =

American politician

William Elza Williams
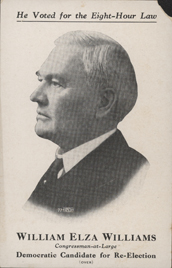

Member of the U.S. House of Representatives from Illinois's 16th district
- In office March 4, 1899 – March 3, 1901
- Preceded by: William H. Hinrichsen
- Succeeded by: Thomas J. Selby

Member of the U.S. House of Representatives from Illinois's at-large (Seat B) district
- In office March 4, 1913 – March 3, 1917
- Preceded by: District created
- Succeeded by: Medill McCormick

Personal details
- Born: May 5, 1857 Pike County, Illinois, U.S.
- Died: September 13, 1921 (aged 64) Pittsfield, Illinois, U.S.
- Party: Democratic Party
- Education: Illinois College

William Elza Williams (May 5, 1857 – September 13, 1921) was a U.S. representative from Illinois.

Born near Detroit, Illinois in Pike County, Williams attended the public schools and Illinois College, Jacksonville, Illinois. He studied law. He was admitted to the bar in 1880 and practiced in Detroit and Pittsfield, Illinois. State's attorney of Pike County, Illinois, 1886–1892. He served as member of the board of aldermen of Pittsfield. He served as member of the board of education. He became trial lawyer for the City Railway Co. of Chicago in 1903.

Williams was elected as a Democrat to the Fifty-sixth Congress (March 4, 1899–March 3, 1901). He resumed the practice of law in Pittsfield, Illinois.

Williams was elected to the Sixty-third and Sixty-fourth Congresses (March 4, 1913–March 3, 1917). He was an unsuccessful candidate for reelection in 1916 to the Sixty-fifth Congress and for election in 1918 to the Sixty-sixth Congress. He continued the practice of law until his death in Pittsfield, Illinois, September 13, 1921. He was interred in Pittsfield West Cemetery.

U.S. House of Representatives
Preceded by William H. Hinrichsen	Member of the U.S. House of Representatives from Illinois's 16th congressional district 1899-1901	Succeeded by Thomas J. Selby
Preceded by District created	Member of the U.S. House of Representatives from Illinois's at-large congressional district 1913-1917	Succeeded by Medill McCormick
