= James T. Hammond =

American politician

James Thaddeus Hammond (born December 11, 1856 – October 9, 1942) was the first Secretary of State of Utah.

Hammond was born in Farmington, Utah Territory, in 1856. He was baptized as a member of the Church of Jesus Christ of Latter-day Saints in 1864. From 1881 to 1882 he served as a Mormon missionary in the Southern States Mission. He was a lawyer and also involved in business. In 1884 and 1886 he served in the Utah Territorial Senate. In 1895, he was elected Secretary of State and was reelected in 1900.

== Sources ==
- Andrew Jenson. Latter-day Saint Biographical Encyclopedia. Vol. 1, p. 723.
