= Joseph V. Graff =

American politician (1854–1921)

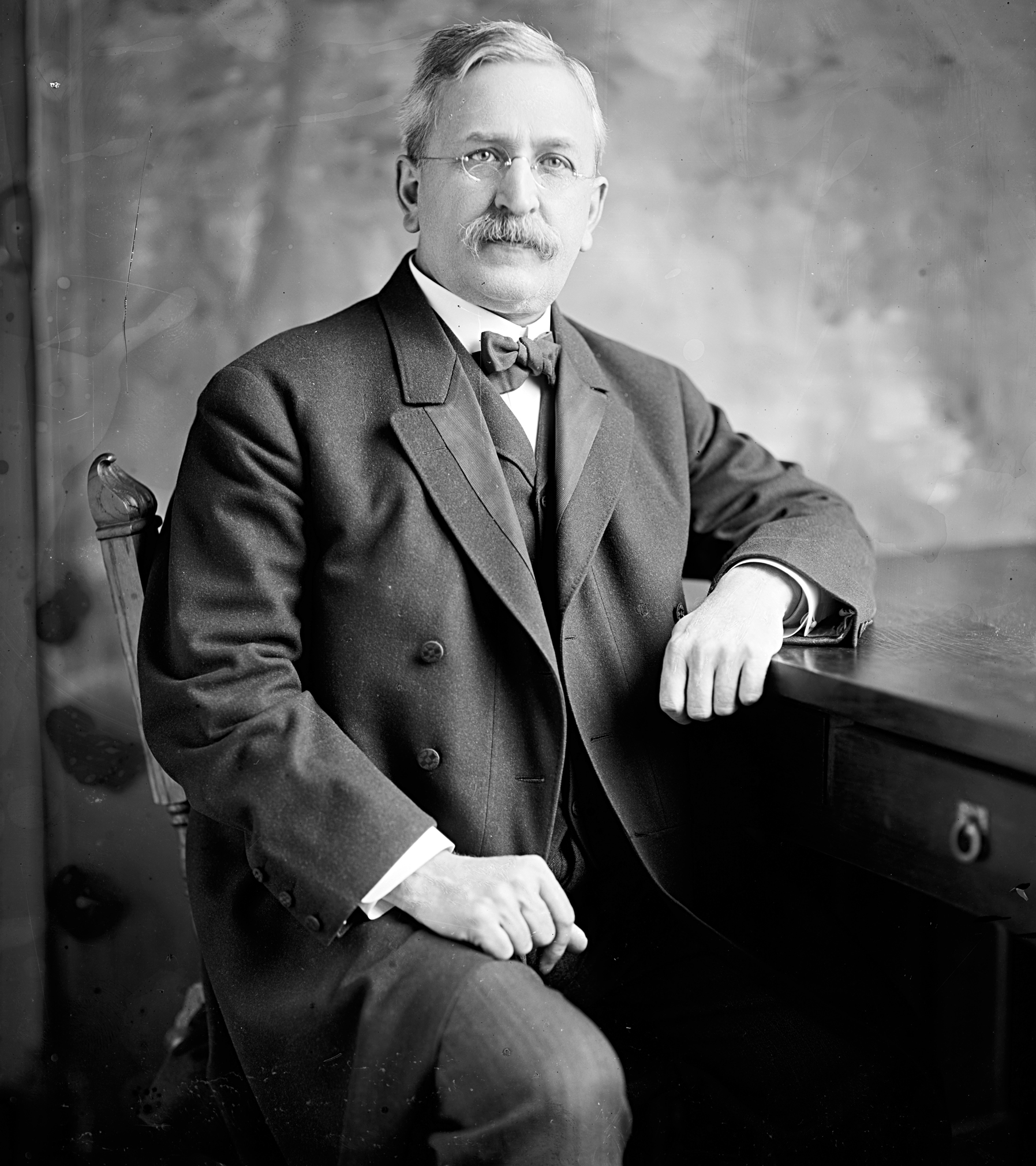
- Graff, 1905–1921

Member of the U.S. House of Representatives from Illinois
- In office March 4, 1895 – March 3, 1911
- Preceded by: Benjamin F. Funk (14th); Thomas J. Selby (16th)
- Succeeded by: Benjamin F. Marsh (14th); Claude U. Stone (16th)
- Constituency: 14th district (1895-1903); 16th district (1903-11)

Personal details
- Born: July 1, 1854 Terre Haute, Indiana, U.S.
- Died: November 10, 1921 (aged 67) Peoria, Illinois, U.S.
- Party: Republican

Joseph Verdi Graff (July 1, 1854 – November 10, 1921) was a U.S. representative from Illinois.

Born in Terre Haute, Indiana, Graff was graduated from the Terre Haute High School, and attended Wabash College, Crawfordsville, Indiana, one year. He moved to Delavan, Illinois, in 1873 and engaged in mercantile pursuits. He studied law. He was admitted to the bar in 1879 and commenced practice in Delavan, Illinois. He moved to Pekin, Illinois, and continued the practice of law.

Graff was elected as an inspector of the Pekin public schools in 1891 and served as president of the board of education. He served as delegate to the Republican National Convention in 1892.

Graff was elected as a Republican to the Fifty-fourth and to the seven succeeding Congresses (March 4, 1895 – March 3, 1911). He served as chairman of the Committee on Claims (Fifty-sixth through Fifty-eighth Congresses). He was an unsuccessful candidate for reelection in 1910 to the Sixty-second Congress. He continued the practice of law in Peoria, Illinois, where he had moved in 1899. He also engaged in banking. He died in Peoria, Illinois, November 10, 1921. He was interred in Glendale Cemetery, Washington, Tazewell County, Illinois.

U.S. House of Representatives
Preceded by Benjamin F. Funk	Member of the U.S. House of Representatives from Illinois's 14th congressional district 1895-1903	Succeeded by Benjamin F. Marsh
Preceded by Thomas J. Selby	Member of the U.S. House of Representatives from Illinois's 16th congressional district 1903-1911	Succeeded by Claude U. Stone
