= Charles Little (cricketer) =

English cricketer (1870–1922)

Personal information
- Full name: Charles William Little
- Born: 22 May 1870; Tonbridge, Kent
- Died: 20 May 1922 (aged 51); Southgate Hill, Winchester, Hampshire
- Batting: Right-handed
- Role: Wicket-keeper

Domestic team information
- Years: Team
- 1890–1892: Oxford University
- 1893: Kent
- FC debut: 29 May 1890 Oxford University v Marylebone Cricket Club (MCC)
- Last FC: 31 July 1893 Kent v Yorkshire

Career statistics
Competition	First-class
Matches	11
Runs scored	160
Batting average	10.66
100s/50s	0/0
Top score	28
Catches/stumpings	16/2
- Source: Cricinfo, 8 March 2017

Charles William Little (22 May 1870 – 20 May 1922) was an English amateur cricketer. He played in 11 first-class cricket matches between 1890 and 1893 for Oxford University and Kent County Cricket Club.

Little was born at Tonbridge in Kent in 1870, the third son of the Reverend Joseph Little, who taught at Tonbridge School, and his wife Mary. He was educated at Winchester College where he played cricket in the school team in 1888 and 1889. From Winchester he went up to New College, Oxford.

Little made his first-class cricket debut for Oxford University in May 1890 and went on to play in six matches for the university team, although he did not win a blue. After graduating he played in five matches for Kent during the 1893 season, and a single (minor) match for Shropshire in 1900. His Wisden obituary described him as "a good bat cutting particularly well, and an excellent wicket keeper" when he was at school.

Professionally Little was a teacher, initially as a private tutor before teaching at Rugby School and, from 1904 until his death, at Winchester College. He served as a lieutenant in the 1st Volunteer Battalion of the Hampshire Regiment. Little died at Winchester in 1922 aged 51.

== Bibliography ==
- Carlaw, Derek (2020). Kent County Cricketers, A to Z: Part One (1806–1914) (PDF). Cardiff: ACS.
