= John J. Brenholt =

American lawyer and politician

Member of the Illinois Senate
- In office 1899–1903

Mayor of Alton, Illinois
- In office 1893–1895

Personal details
- Born: John J. Brenholt; October 14, 1843 St. Louis, Missouri, U.S.
- Died: May 20, 1934 (aged 90) Alton, Illinois, U.S.
- Party: Republican
- Education: Illinois College; Albany Law School
- Occupation: Politician, lawyer

John Jacob Brenholt Sr. (October 14, 1843 – May 20, 1934) was an American lawyer and politician.

Brenholt was born in St. Louis, Missouri. He went to Illinois College and to Albany Law School. He was admitted to the Illinois bar and practiced law in Chicago, Illinois for one year. He then moved to Alton, Illinois and continued to practice law. He served on the Alton City Council. Brenholt then served as mayor of Alton from 1893 to 1895. He was a Republican. Brenholt served in the Illinois Senate from 1899 to 1903 and served as president of the Illinois Senate. Brenholt died at his home in Alton, Illinois.
