= Thomas J. Selby =

American politician

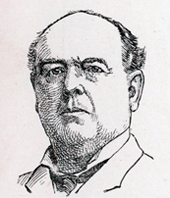

Member of the U.S. House of Representatives from Illinois's 16th district
- In office March 4, 1901 – March 3, 1903
- Preceded by: William E. Williams
- Succeeded by: Joseph V. Graff

Personal details
- Born: December 4, 1840 Delaware County, Ohio, U.S.
- Died: March 10, 1917 (aged 76) Hardin, Illinois, U.S.
- Party: Democratic

Thomas Jefferson Selby (December 4, 1840 – March 10, 1917) was a U.S. representative from Illinois.

Born in Delaware County, Ohio, Selby attended the common schools. He studied law, was admitted to the bar in 1869 and commenced the practice of his profession in 1875. From 1864 to 1866, he served as Sheriff of Jersey County, Illinois. He also published the Jersey County Democrat from 1866 to 1870 and worked as the county clerk from 1869 to 1877.

He served two terms as the mayor of Jerseyville and was the state attorney for Calhoun County from 1888 to 1900. Selby was elected as a Democrat to the 57th Congress and served March 4, 1901 – March 3, 1903.

Afterwards, he resumed the practice of law. He died in Hardin, Illinois, on March 10, 1917, and is buried in Hardin Cemetery.

U.S. House of Representatives
| Preceded by William E. Williams | Member of the U.S. House of Representatives from Illinois's 16th congressional district 1901-1903 | Succeeded by Joseph V. Graff |
