= 1897 United States House of Representatives elections =

1897 U.S. House of Representatives elections
- April 20, 1897 – November 23, 1897

8 (out of 357) seats in the U.S. House of Representatives 179 seats needed for a majority
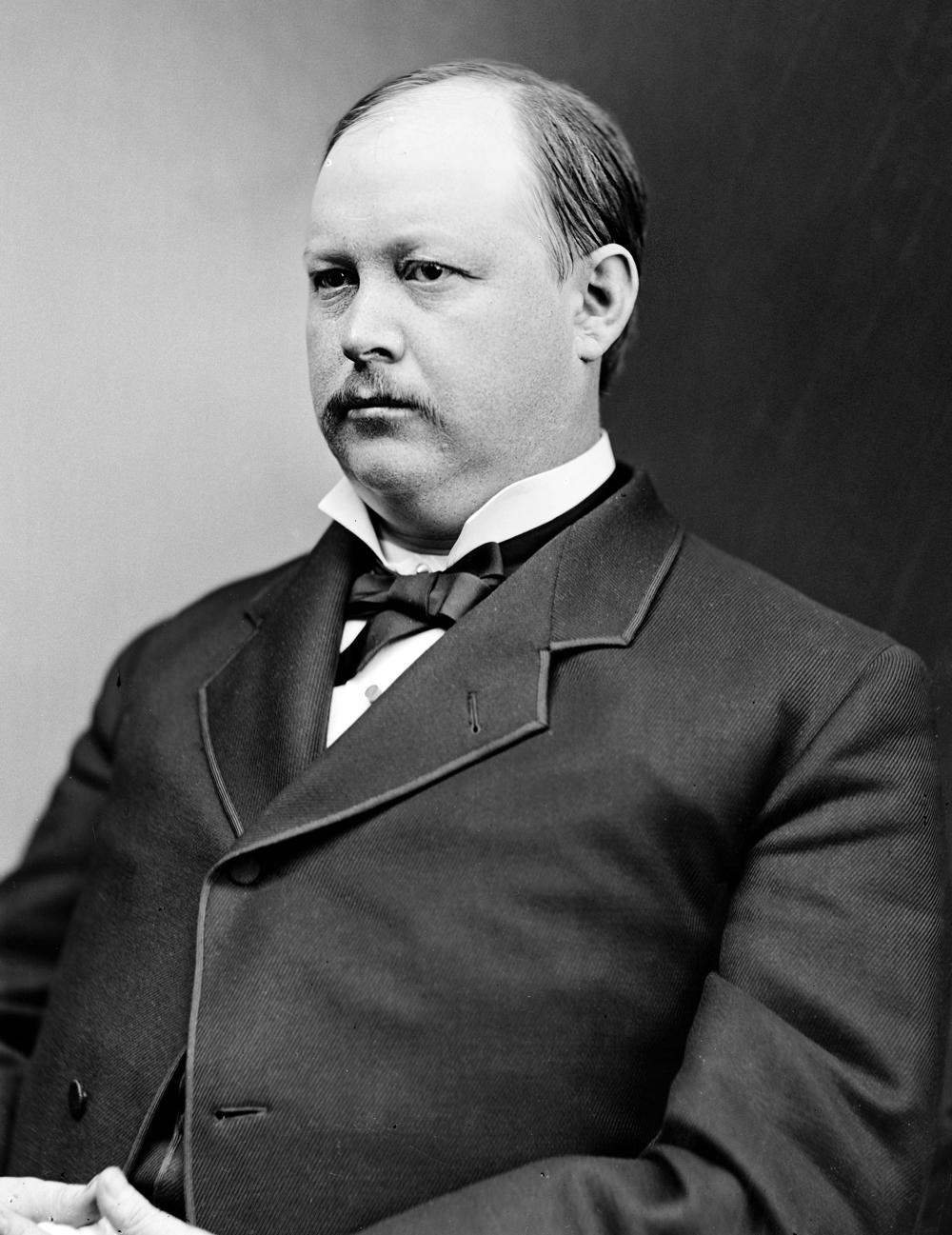

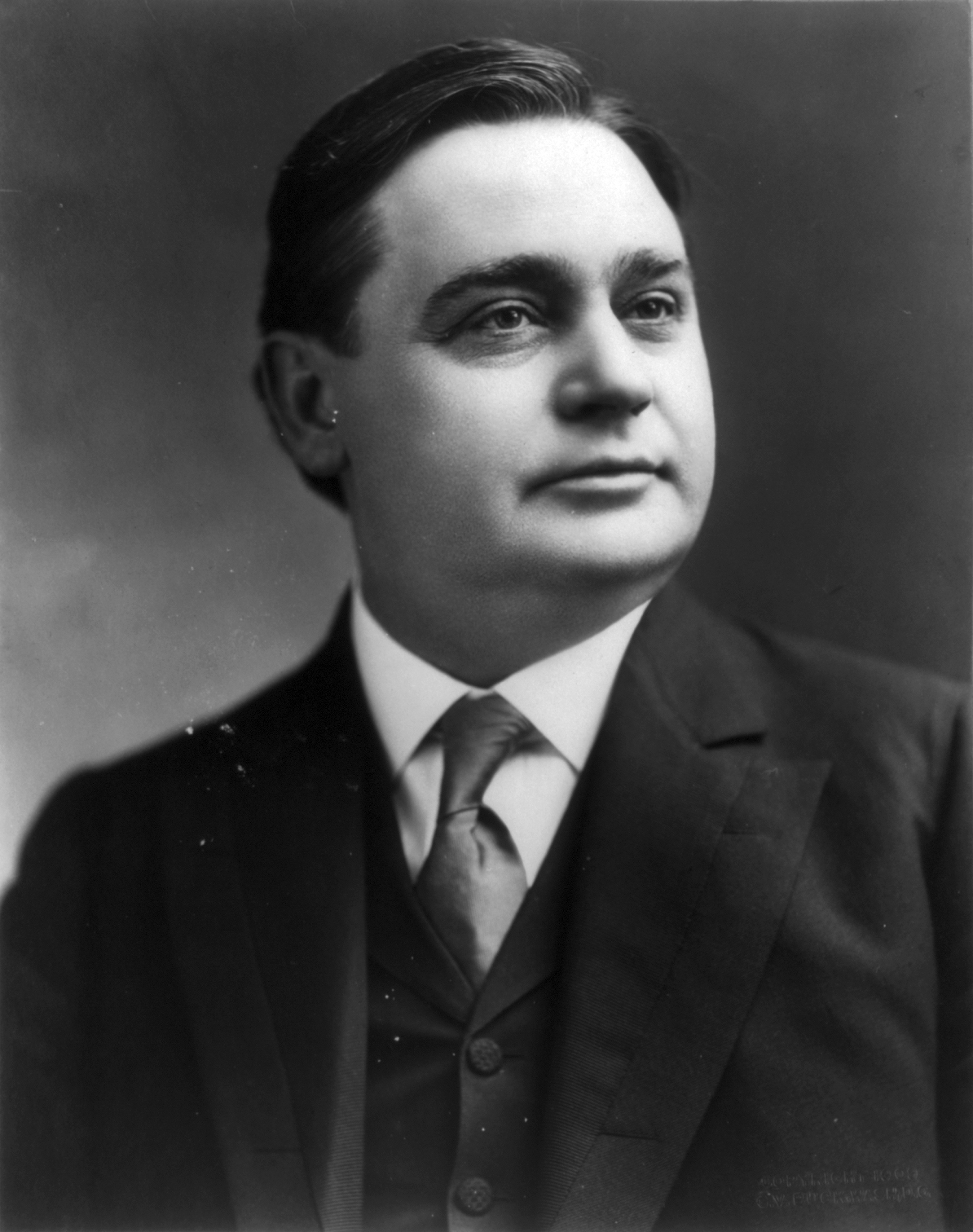
	Majority party	Minority party
Leader	Thomas B. Reed	Joseph Weldon Bailey
Party	Republican	Democratic
Leader's seat	Maine 1st	Texas 4th
Last election	210 seats	124 seats
Seats won	3	5
Seat change	▼2	▲2
	Third party	Fourth party
Party	Populist	Silver
Last election	22 seats	1 seat
Seats won	0	0
Seat change	Steady	Steady

There were eight special elections to the United States House of Representatives in 1897 during the 55th United States Congress, which began on March 4, 1897. None of the special elections in 1897 were during the 54th United States Congress, which ended March 3, 1897.

District	Incumbent			This race	
District	Member	Party	First elected	Results	Candidates
Pennsylvania 25	James J. Davidson	Republican	1896	Member-elect died January 2, 1897, before the term. New member elected April 20, 1897 and seated May 3, 1897. Republican hold.	▌ ✓ Joseph B. Showalter (Republican) 66.2%; ▌Salem Heilman (Democratic) 33.7%
Missouri 1	Richard P. Giles	Democratic	1896	Member-elect died November 17, 1896, before the term. New member elected June 1, 1897 and seated June 10, 1897. Democratic hold.	▌ ✓ James T. Lloyd (Democratic) 56.9%; ▌Clark (Republican) 39.8%
Maine 3	Seth L. Milliken	Republican	1882	Member-elect died April 18, 1897. New member elected June 21, 1897 and seated July 1, 1897. Republican hold.	▌ ✓ Edwin C. Burleigh (Republican) 73.9%; ▌Frederick W. Plaisted (Democratic) 23.8%
South Carolina 6	John L. McLaurin	Democratic	1892 (special)	Incumbent resigned May 31, 1897, when appointed U.S. Senator. New member elected October 12, 1897 and seated December 6, 1897. Democratic hold.	▌ ✓ James Norton (Democratic); Unopposed
Massachusetts 1	Ashley B. Wright	Republican	1892	Incumbent died August 14, 1897. New member elected November 2, 1897 and seated December 6, 1897. Republican hold.	▌ ✓ George P. Lawrence (Republican) 58.6%; ▌Roger P. Donoghue (Democratic) 37.3%
Indiana 4	William S. Holman	Democratic	1858; 1864 (retired); 1866; 1876 (retired); 1880; 1894 (lost); 1896	Incumbent died April 22, 1897. New member elected August 10, 1897 and seated December 6, 1897. Democratic hold.	▌ ✓ Francis M. Griffith (Democratic) 51.47%; ▌Charles W. Lee (Republican) 46.69%; ▌Uriah M. Browder (Populist) 1.84%
New York 3	Francis H. Wilson	Republican	1894	Incumbent resigned September 30, 1897, to become Postmaster of Brooklyn. New member elected November 2, 1897 and seated December 6, 1897. Democratic gain.	▌ ✓ Edmund H. Driggs (Democratic) 47.6%; ▌William A. Prendergast (Republican) 41.4%; ▌Horatio C. King (ND) 9.6%
Illinois 6	Edward D. Cooke	Republican	1894	Incumbent died June 24, 1897. New member elected November 23, 1897 and seated December 6, 1897. Democratic gain.	▌ ✓ Henry S. Boutell (Republican) 51.4%; ▌Vincent H. Perkins (Democratic) 47.0%

== See also ==
- List of special elections to the United States House of Representatives
