= Charles A. Little =

American politician

General Charles A. Little (January 23, 1854 – November 29, 1920) was an American lawyer, a member of the Maryland House of Delegates, and a brigadier general in the national guard.

== Biography ==
Born at Fairfield, Pennsylvania, Little attended public schools and graduated from Franklin and Marshall College in 1878. In 1883, he was admitted to the bar, and elected to the Maryland House of Delegates, serving in the session of 1884. In 1891, he was elected State's Attorney for Washington County, holding the office for four years. In 1900, he was the Democratic nominee for Congress but was defeated by George A. Pearre.

Little joined the Maryland National Guard in 1887, and served as a commanding infantry officer during World War I and after, until reaching his mandatory age of retirement at 64 years of age, retiring as a Brigadier General. He died at Washington County Hospital from typhoid in 1920.
