= 1886 United States House of Representatives elections =

House elections for the 50th U.S. Congress

- June 7, 1886 – November 2, 1886 (Note: Regular elections only, not specials)

All 325 seats in the United States House of Representatives 163 seats needed for a majority
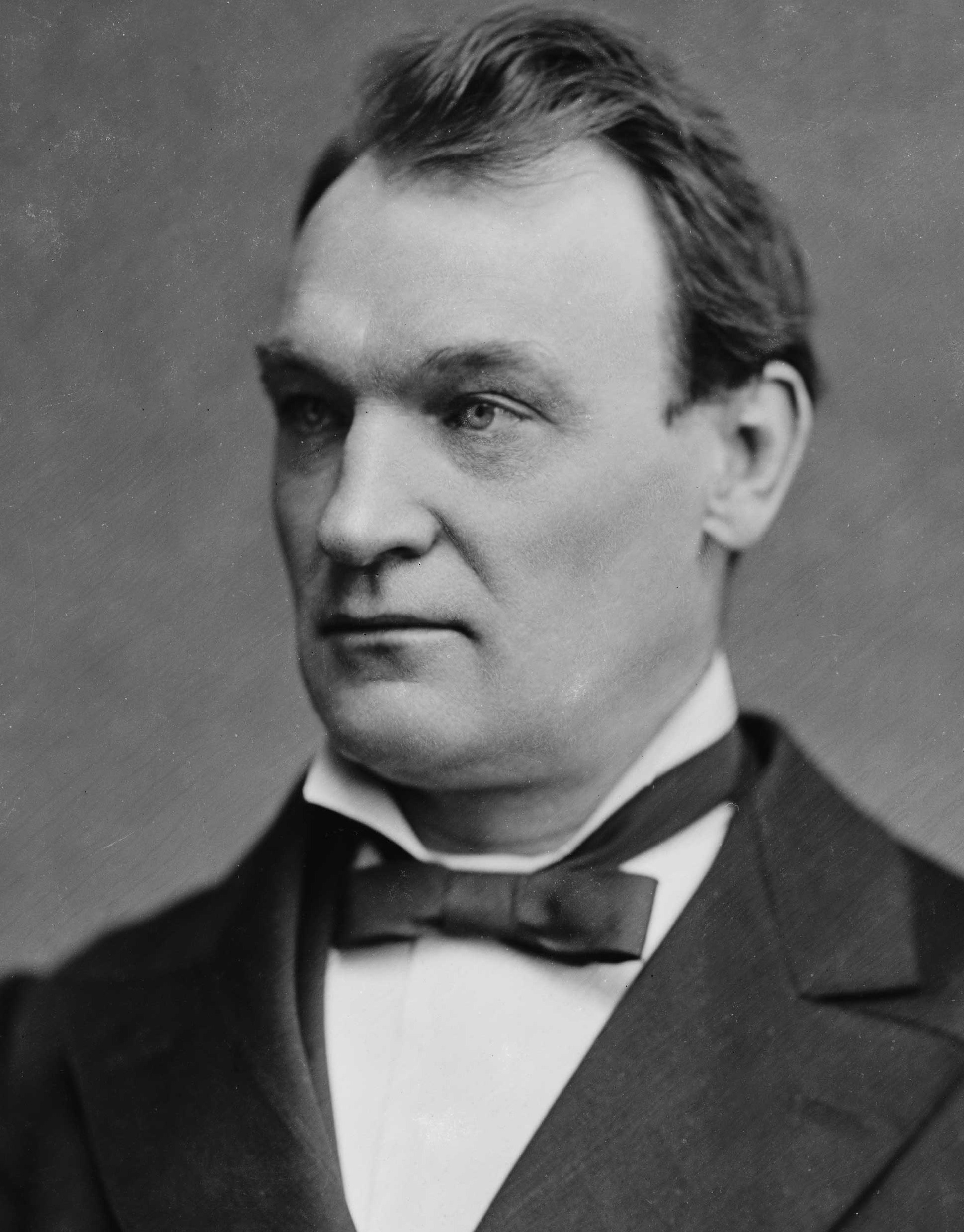

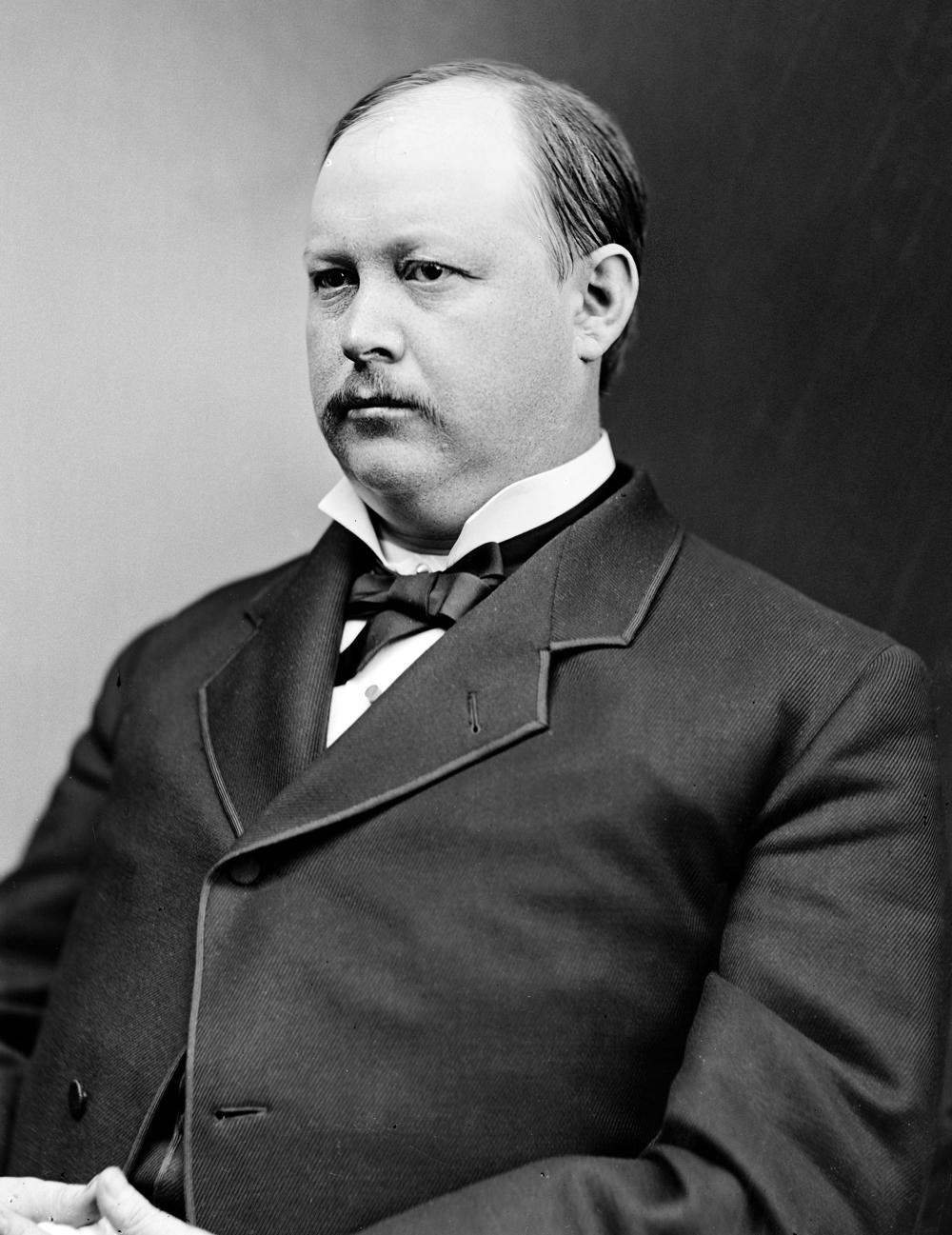
	Majority party	Minority party
Leader	John G. Carlisle	Thomas Brackett Reed
Party	Democratic	Republican
Leader's seat	Kentucky 6th	Maine 1st
Last election	182 seats	141 seats
Seats won	167	152
Seat change	▼15	▲11
Popular vote	4,126,909	3,858,355
Percentage	48.12%	44.99%
Swing	▼1.93pp	▼2.14pp
	Third party	Fourth party
Party	Labor	Greenback
Last election	0 seats	1 seat
Seats won	2	1
Seat change	▲2	Steady
Popular vote	92,851	32,358
Percentage	1.08%	0.38%
Swing	New party	▼0.69pp
	Fifth party
Party	Independent
Last election	1 seat (Note: Including 1 Independent Democrat.)
Seats won	3 (Note: Including 2 Independent Republicans.)
Seat change	▲2
Popular vote	178,314
Percentage	2.08%
Swing	▲1.28pp
Results
Democratic gain
Democratic hold
Republican gain
Republican hold
Labor gain
Independent gain
Greenback hold
Speaker before election
John G. Carlisle
Democratic
Elected Speaker
John G. Carlisle
Democratic

The 1886 United States House of Representatives elections were held for the most part on November 2, 1886, with three states holding theirs early between June and September. They occurred in the middle of President Grover Cleveland's first term. Elections were held for 325 seats of the United States House of Representatives, representing 38 states, to serve in the 50th United States Congress. Special elections were also held throughout the year.

As in many midterm elections, the President's party lost seats to the opposition, in this case, Democrats lost seats to Republicans, although a narrow majority was retained. Many of these Republican pickups were in the industrializing Midwest states, where the debate over tariffs, which were advocated by Republicans to protect domestic industry but opposed by Democrats to allow for free agricultural trade, led to political change. The small Labor Party, supported by industrial workers, gained one seat each in Virginia and Wisconsin, while the Greenback Party maintained its one seat in Iowa (James B. Weaver). One Independent was also elected in North Carolina.

== Election summaries ==
↓
167	6	152
Democratic	(Note: There were 2 Labor members, 2 Independent Republicans, 1 Independent, and 1 Greenback members elected.)	Republican

State	Type	Total seats	Democratic		Republican		Others	
State	Type	Total seats	Seats	Change	Seats	Change	Seats	Change
Alabama	District	8	8	Steady	0	Steady	0	Steady
Arkansas	District	5	5	Steady	0	Steady	0	Steady
California	District	6	2	▲1	4	▼1	0	Steady
Colorado	At-large	1	0	Steady	1	Steady	0	Steady
Connecticut	District	4	2	Steady	2	Steady	0	Steady
Delaware	At-large	1	1	Steady	0	Steady	0	Steady
Florida	District	2	2	Steady	0	Steady	0	Steady
Georgia	District	10	10	Steady	0	Steady	0	Steady
Illinois	District	20	6	▼4	14	▲4	0	Steady
Indiana	District	13	6	▼3	7	▲3	0	Steady
Iowa	District	11	1	▼2	9 (Note: Includes 1 Independent Republican.)	▲2	1 (Note: Greenback Party)	Steady
Kansas	District	7	0	Steady	7	Steady	0	Steady
Kentucky	District	11	8	▼2	3	▲2	0	Steady
Louisiana	District	6	6	▲1	0	▼1	0	Steady
Maine	District	4	0	Steady	4	Steady	0	Steady
Maryland	District	6	5	Steady	1	Steady	0	Steady
Massachusetts	District	12	4	▲2	8	▼2	0	Steady
Michigan	District	11	5	▼2	6	▲2	0	Steady
Minnesota	District	5	3	▲3	2	▼3	0	Steady
Mississippi	District	7	7	Steady	0	Steady	0	Steady
Missouri	District	14	12	Steady	2	Steady	0	Steady
Nebraska	District	3	1	▲1	2	▼1	0	Steady
Nevada	At-large	1	0	Steady	1	Steady	0	Steady
New Hampshire	District	2	1	▲1	1	▼1	0	Steady
New Jersey	District	7	2	▼1	5	▲1	0	Steady
New York	District	34	16	▼1	18	▲1	0	Steady
North Carolina	District	9	7	▼1	1	Steady	1	▲1
Ohio	District	21	6	▼5	15	▲5	0	Steady
Oregon	At-large	1	0	Steady	1	Steady	0	Steady
Pennsylvania	District + at-large	28	8	Steady	20	Steady	0	Steady
Rhode Island	District	2	0	Steady	2	Steady	0	Steady
South Carolina	District	7	7	▲1	0	▼1	0	Steady
Tennessee	District	10	8	▲1	2	▼1	0	Steady
Texas	District	11	11	Steady	0	Steady	0	Steady
Vermont	District	2	0	Steady	2	Steady	0	Steady
Virginia	District	10	3	▼5	6	▲5	1 (Note: Labor Party)	▲1
West Virginia	District	4	3	Steady	1	Steady	0	Steady
Wisconsin	District	9	1	▼1	7	Steady	1	▲1
Total		325	167 51.4%	▼16	154 47.4%	▲13	4 1.2%	▲3

Popular vote
Democratic	48.12%
Greenback	0.38%
Independent	2.06%
Labor	1.08%
Republican	44.99%
Others	3.37%

House seats
Democratic	51.38%
Greenback	0.31%
Independent	0.92%
Labor	0.62%
Republican	46.77%

There were 2 Labor and 1 Independent members elected, and 1 Greenback member re-elected. The previous election saw just the Greenback elected.

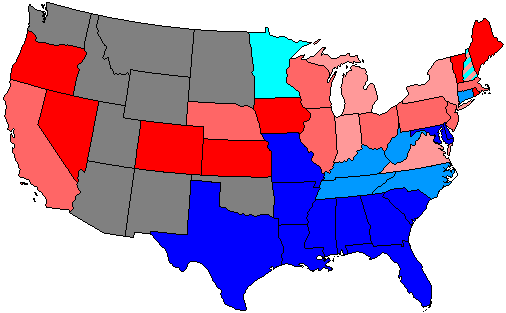
House seats by party holding plurality in state: 80+% Democratic / 80+% Republican; 60+% to 80% Democratic / 60+% to 80% Republican; Up to 60% Democratic / Up to 60% Republican

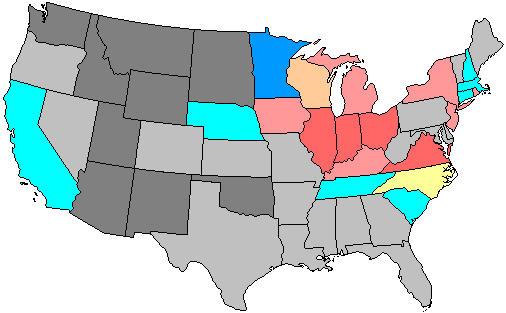
Net gain in party representation: 6+ Democratic gain / / 6+ Republican gain; 3-5 Democratic gain / / 3-5 Republican gain; 1-2 Democratic gain / 1-2 Labor gain / 1-2 Republican gain; 1-2 Independent gain: no net change

== Special elections ==
District	Incumbent			This race	
District	Member	Party	First elected	Results	Candidates
New York 15	Lewis Beach	Democratic	1880	Incumbent died August 10, 1886. New member elected November 2, 1886. Democratic hold. Winner also elected to the next term; see below.	▌ ✓ Henry Bacon (Democratic) 49.07%; ▌Moses D. Stivers (Republican) 47.41%; ▌Alonzo Wheeler (Prohibition) 3.52%
Wisconsin 5	Joseph Rankin	Democratic	1882	Incumbent died January 24, 1886. New member elected February 23, 1886. Democratic hold.	▌ ✓ Thomas R. Hudd (Democratic) 62.1%; ▌Charles Luling (Republican) 37.7%

== Election dates ==
In all the states except three, elections were held November 2, 1886. Those three states, with 7 seats among them, held elections:

- June 7, 1886: Oregon
- September 7, 1886: Vermont
- September 10, 1886: Maine

== Alabama ==
District	Incumbent			This race	
District	Member	Party	First elected	Results	Candidates
Alabama 1	James T. Jones	Democratic	1883	Incumbent re-elected.	▌ ✓ James T. Jones (Democratic) 99.6%
Alabama 2	Hilary A. Herbert	Democratic	1876	Incumbent re-elected.	▌ ✓ Hilary A. Herbert (Democratic) 100.0%
Alabama 3	William C. Oates	Democratic	1880	Incumbent re-elected.	▌ ✓ William C. Oates (Democratic) 100.0%
Alabama 4	Alexander C. Davidson	Democratic	1884	Incumbent re-elected.	▌ ✓ Alexander C. Davidson (Democratic) 71.2%; ▌ J. V. McDuffie (Republican) 16.8%; ▌ Benjamin S. Turner (Independent Republican) 12.0%
Alabama 5	Thomas William Sadler	Democratic	1884	Incumbent lost renomination. Democratic hold.	▌ ✓ James E. Cobb (Democratic) 87.8%; ▌ [FNU] Edwards (Republican) 12.2%
Alabama 6	John Mason Martin	Democratic	1884	Incumbent lost renomination. Democratic hold.	▌ ✓ John H. Bankhead (Democratic) 64.6%; ▌ B. M. Long (Republican) 35.4%
Alabama 7	William H. Forney	Democratic	1874	Incumbent re-elected.	▌ ✓ William H. Forney (Democratic) 62.0%; ▌ J. D. Hardy (Republican) 37.8%
Alabama 8	Joseph Wheeler	Democratic	1880	Incumbent re-elected.	▌ ✓ Joseph Wheeler (Democratic) 57.5%; ▌ James Jackson (Republican) 42.5%

== Arkansas ==
District	Incumbent			This race	
District	Member	Party	First elected	Results	Candidates
Arkansas 1	Poindexter Dunn	Democratic	1878	Incumbent re-elected.	▌ ✓ Poindexter Dunn (Democratic) 100%
Arkansas 2	Clifton R. Breckinridge	Democratic	1882	Incumbent re-elected.	▌ ✓ Clifton R. Breckinridge (Democratic) 54.4%; ▌D. D. Leach (Republican) 27.7%; ▌Reuben B. CarlLee (Agricultural Wheel) 18.0%
Arkansas 3	Thomas C. McRae	Democratic	1885 (special)	Incumbent re-elected.	▌ ✓ Thomas C. McRae (Democratic) 57.8%; ▌J. C. Ray (Republican) 27.0%; ▌L. H. Hitt (Greenback) 15.2%
Arkansas 4	John H. Rogers	Democratic	1882	Incumbent re-elected.	▌ ✓ John H. Rogers (Democratic) 62.1%; ▌Isom P. Langley (Labor) 37.9%
Arkansas 5	Samuel W. Peel	Democratic	1882	Incumbent re-elected.	▌ ✓ Samuel W. Peel (Democratic) 100%

== Arizona Territory ==
See Non-voting delegates, below.

== California ==
District	Incumbent			This race	
District	Member	Party	First elected	Results	Candidates
California 1	Barclay Henley	Democratic	1882	Incumbent retired. Democratic hold	▌ ✓ Thomas Larkin Thompson (Democratic) 50.0%; ▌Charles A. Garter (Republican) 47.1%; ▌L. W. Simmons (Prohibition) 2.6%; ▌Philip Cowen (Greenback) 0.3%
California 2	James A. Louttit	Republican	1884	Incumbent retired. Democratic gain.	▌ ✓ Marion Biggs (Democratic) 49.8%; ▌J. C. Campbell (Republican) 46.8%; ▌William O. Clark (Prohibition) 3.0%
California 3	Joseph McKenna	Republican	1884	Incumbent re-elected.	▌ ✓ Joseph McKenna (Republican) 53.0%; ▌Henry C. McPike (Democratic) 44.5%; ▌W. W. Smith (Prohibition) 2.4%
California 4	William W. Morrow	Republican	1884	Incumbent re-elected.	▌ ✓ William W. Morrow (Republican) 48.4%; ▌Frank McCoppin (Democratic) 41.8%; ▌Charles A. Sumner (Labor) 9.3%; ▌Robert Thompson (Prohibition) 0.4%
California 5	Charles N. Felton	Republican	1884	Incumbent re-elected.	▌ ✓ Charles N. Felton (Republican) 48.5%; ▌Frank J. Sullivan (Democratic) 48.2%; ▌A. E. Redstone (Independent) 1.9%; ▌C. Henderson (Prohibition) 1.4%
California 6	Henry Markham	Republican	1884	Incumbent retired. Republican hold	▌ ✓ William Vandever (Republican) 47.3%; ▌Joseph D. Lynch (Democratic) 47.1%; ▌W. A. Harris (Prohibition) 5.6%

== Colorado ==
District	Incumbent			This race	
District	Member	Party	First elected	Results	Candidates
Colorado at-large	George G. Symes	Republican	1884	Incumbent re-elected.	▌ ✓ George G. Symes (Republican) 47.6%; ▌ Myron W. Reed (Democratic) 46.2%; ▌ Joseph Murray (Prohibition) 6.2%

== Connecticut ==
District	Incumbent			This race	
District	Member	Party	First elected	Results	Candidates
Connecticut 1	John R. Buck	Republican	1884	Incumbent lost re-election. Democratic gain.	▌ ✓ Robert J. Vance (Democratic) 48.3%; ▌John R. Buck (Republican) 47.2%; ▌Samuel W. Hart (Prohibition) 3.2%; ▌Henry L. Soper (Labor) 1.2%
Connecticut 2	Charles L. Mitchell	Democratic	1882	Incumbent retired. Democratic hold.	▌ ✓ Carlos French (Democratic) 47.9%; ▌Edward C. Lewis (Republican) 44.5%; ▌George Mansfield (Labor) 4.2%; ▌Edwin P. Augur (Prohibition) 3.4%
Connecticut 3	John T. Wait	Republican	1876 (special)	Incumbent retired. Republican hold.	▌ ✓ Charles A. Russell (Republican) 48.9%; ▌Frederick Hyde (Democratic) 45.5%; ▌John A. Rockwell (Prohibition) 5.6%
Connecticut 4	Edward W. Seymour	Democratic	1882	Incumbent retired. Democratic hold.	▌ ✓ Miles T. Granger (Democratic) 47.8%; ▌Frederick Miles (Republican) 46.9%; ▌Edward Manchester (Prohibition) 3.2%; ▌S. D. Bingham (Labor) 2.0%

== Dakota Territory ==
See Non-voting delegates, below.

== Delaware ==
District	Incumbent			This race	
District	Member	Party	First elected	Results	Candidates
Delaware at-large	Charles B. Lore	Democratic	1882	Incumbent retired. Democratic hold.	▌ ✓ John B. Penington (Democratic) 62.2%; ▌ Richard M. Cooper (Temperance Reform) 37.8%

== Florida ==
District	Incumbent			This race	
District	Member	Party	First elected	Results	Candidates
Florida 1	Robert H. M. Davidson	Democratic	1876	Incumbent re-elected.	▌ ✓ Robert H. M. Davidson (Democratic) 66.2%; ▌C. B. Pendleton (Republican) 33.8%
Florida 2	Charles Dougherty	Democratic	1884	Incumbent re-elected.	▌ ✓ Charles Dougherty (Democratic) 54.1%; ▌J. C. Greeley (Republican) 45.2%; ▌R. B. Norment (Prohibition) 0.7%

== Georgia ==
District	Incumbent			This race	
District	Member	Party	First elected	Results	Candidates
Georgia 1	Thomas M. Norwood	Democratic	1884	Incumbent re-elected.	▌ ✓ Thomas M. Norwood (Democratic) 99.2%
Georgia 2	Henry G. Turner	Democratic	1880	Incumbent re-elected.	▌ ✓ Henry G. Turner (Democratic) 99.7%
Georgia 3	Charles F. Crisp	Democratic	1882	Incumbent re-elected.	▌ ✓ Charles F. Crisp (Democratic) 100.0%
Georgia 4	Henry R. Harris	Democratic	1884	Incumbent retired. Democratic hold.	▌ ✓ Thomas W. Grimes (Democratic) 89.8%; ▌ [FNU] Carmichael (Republican) 10.2%
Georgia 5	Nathaniel J. Hammond	Democratic	1878	Incumbent retired. Democratic hold.	▌ ✓ John D. Stewart (Democratic) 100.0%
Georgia 6	James Henderson Blount	Democratic	1872	Incumbent re-elected.	▌ ✓ James Henderson Blount (Democratic) 99.9%
Georgia 7	Judson C. Clements	Democratic	1880	Incumbent re-elected.	▌ ✓ Judson C. Clements (Democratic) 75.5%; ▌ [FNU] Felton (Republican) 23.0%
Georgia 8	Seaborn Reese	Democratic	1882	Incumbent retired. Democratic hold.	▌ ✓ Henry H. Carlton (Democratic) 97.7%
Georgia 9	Allen D. Candler	Democratic	1882	Incumbent re-elected.	▌ ✓ Allen D. Candler (Democratic) 98.9%
Georgia 10	George Barnes	Democratic	1884	Incumbent re-elected.	▌ ✓ George Barnes (Democratic) 99.6%

== Idaho Territory ==
See Non-voting delegates, below.

== Illinois ==
District	Incumbent			This race	
District	Member	Party	First elected	Results	Candidates
Illinois 1	Ransom W. Dunham	Republican	1882	Incumbent re-elected.	▌ ✓ Ransom W. Dunham (Republican) 46.9%; ▌ Edgar Terhune (Democratic) 27.6%; ▌ Harvey Sheldon Jr. (Union Labor) 24.2%; ▌ George C. Christian (Prohibition) 1.3%
Illinois 2	Frank Lawler	Democratic	1884	Incumbent re-elected.	▌ ✓ Frank Lawler (Democratic) 39.3%; ▌ Daniel F. Gleeson (Union Labor) 39.3%; ▌ Charles W. Woodman (Republican) 21.2%; ▌ J. W. Lee (Prohibition) 0.2%
Illinois 3	James Hugh Ward	Democratic	1884	Incumbent retired. Republican gain.	▌ ✓ William E. Mason (Republican) 66.2%; ▌ B. W. Goodhue (Union Labor) 30.7%; ▌ J. L. Whitlock (Prohibition) 2.0%
Illinois 4	George E. Adams	Republican	1882	Incumbent re-elected.	▌ ✓ George E. Adams (Republican) 48.1%; ▌ Jonathan B. Taylor (Democratic) 29.6%; ▌ I. A. Hawkins (Union Labor) 19.8%; ▌ G. W. Gray (Prohibition) 2.5%
Illinois 5	Albert J. Hopkins	Republican	1885	Incumbent re-elected.	▌ ✓ Albert J. Hopkins (Republican) 62.9%; ▌ Joseph Glidden (Democratic) 27.7%; ▌ Charles Wheaton (Prohibition) 9.4%
Illinois 6	Robert R. Hitt	Republican	1882	Incumbent re-elected.	▌ ✓ Robert R. Hitt (Republican) 55.5%; ▌ James McNamara (Democratic) 36.6%; ▌ Spencer Rising (Prohibition) 8.0%
Illinois 7	Thomas J. Henderson	Republican	1874	Incumbent re-elected.	▌ ✓ Thomas J. Henderson (Republican) 58.2%; ▌ Sherwood Dixon (Democratic) 35.8%; ▌ David E. Holmes (Prohibition) 6.0%
Illinois 8	Ralph Plumb	Republican	1884	Incumbent re-elected.	▌ ✓ Ralph Plumb (Republican) 52.1%; ▌ Hiram H. Cady (Democratic) 43.0%; ▌ Daniel B. Turney (Prohibition) 3.2%
Illinois 9	Lewis E. Payson	Republican	1880	Incumbent re-elected.	▌ ✓ Lewis E. Payson (Republican) 54.2%; ▌ Mathews H. Peters (Democratic) 41.9%; ▌ James McGrew (Prohibition) 3.9%
Illinois 10	Nicholas E. Worthington	Democratic	1882	Incumbent lost re-election. Republican gain.	▌ ✓ Philip S. Post (Republican) 48.7%; ▌ Nicholas E. Worthington (Democratic) 48.6%; ▌ David S. McCulloch (Prohibition) 2.7%
Illinois 11	William H. Neece	Democratic	1882	Incumbent lost re-election. Republican gain.	▌ ✓ William H. Gest (Republican) 48.8%; ▌ William H. Neece (Democratic/Greenback) 47.9%; ▌ James R. Hanna (Prohibition) 3.3%
Illinois 12	James M. Riggs	Democratic	1882	Incumbent retired. Democratic hold.	▌ ✓ George A. Anderson (Democratic/Greenback) 57.5%; ▌ Aman Pierson (Republican) 39.2%; ▌ Samuel P. Woods (Prohibition) 3.3%
Illinois 13	William McKendree Springer	Democratic	1874	Incumbent re-elected.	▌ ✓ William McKendree Springer (Democratic) 49.5%; ▌ James A. Connolly (Republican) 46.7%; ▌ Uriah M. Browder (Prohibition) 3.8%
Illinois 14	Jonathan H. Rowell	Republican	1882	Incumbent re-elected.	▌ ✓ Jonathan H. Rowell (Republican) 51.0%; ▌ William Voorhees (Democratic) 43.0%; ▌ William W. Alder (Prohibition) 6.0%
Illinois 15	Joseph Gurney Cannon	Republican	1872	Incumbent re-elected.	▌ ✓ Joseph Gurney Cannon (Republican) 50.9%; ▌ D. H. Lindsey (Democratic) 46.6%; ▌ Archibald Easton (Prohibition) 2.5%
Illinois 16	Silas Z. Landes	Democratic	1884	Incumbent re-elected.	▌ ✓ Silas Z. Landes (Democratic) 50.2%; ▌ Charles Churchill (Republican) 47.6%; ▌ Hale Johnson (Prohibition) 2.2%
Illinois 17	John R. Eden	Democratic	1884	Incumbent lost renomination. Democratic hold.	▌ ✓ Edward Lane (Democratic) 53.9%; ▌ Robert McWilliams (Republican) 41.7%; ▌ Henry B. Kepley (Prohibition) 4.4%
Illinois 18	William Ralls Morrison	Democratic	1872	Incumbent lost re-election. Republican gain	▌ ✓ Jehu Baker (Republican) 50.8%; ▌ William Ralls Morrison (Democratic) 46.9%; ▌ William K. Moore (Prohibition) 2.3%
Illinois 19	Richard W. Townshend	Democratic	1876	Incumbent re-elected.	▌ ✓ Richard W. Townshend (Democratic) 56.1%; ▌ James S. Martin (Republican) 41.2%; ▌ Robert R. Link (Prohibition) 2.6%
Illinois 20	John R. Thomas	Republican	1878	Incumbent re-elected.	▌ ✓ John R. Thomas (Republican) 50.9%; ▌ William Hartzell (Democratic) 47.3%; ▌ Sampson D. Poor (Prohibition) 1.8%

== Indiana ==
District	Incumbent			This race	
District	Member	Party	First elected	Results	Candidates
Indiana 1	John J. Kleiner	Democratic	1882	Incumbent lost renomination. Republican gain.	▌ ✓ Alvin Peterson Hovey (Republican) 49.0%; ▌ James E. McCullough (Democratic) 45.4%; ▌ James G. Nesbit (Prohibition) 4.5%
Indiana 2	Thomas R. Cobb	Democratic	1876	Incumbent retired. Democratic hold.	▌ ✓ John H. O'Neall (Democratic) 51.8%; ▌ M. S. Ragsdale (Republican) 47.9%; ▌ Garland Blewitt (Prohibition) 0.3%
Indiana 3	Jonas G. Howard	Democratic	1884	Incumbent re-elected.	▌ ✓ Jonas G. Howard (Democratic) 47.5%; ▌ James K. Marsh (Independent Democratic) 37.5%; ▌ James Keigwin (Republican) 14.2%; ▌ E. S. Hopkins (Prohibition) 0.8%
Indiana 4	William S. Holman	Democratic	1880	Incumbent re-elected.	▌ ✓ William S. Holman (Democratic) 50.8%; ▌ Thomas J. Lucas (Republican) 48.3%; ▌ R. P. Wilson (Prohibition) 0.6%
Indiana 5	Courtland C. Matson	Democratic	1880	Incumbent re-elected.	▌ ✓ Courtland C. Matson (Democratic) 49.9%; ▌ Ira Joy Chase (Republican) 48.3%; ▌ I. G. Tomlinson (Prohibition) 1.5%
Indiana 6	Thomas M. Browne	Republican	1876	Incumbent re-elected.	▌ ✓ Thomas M. Browne (Republican) 60.4%; ▌ George S. Jones (Democratic) 36.3%; ▌ George D. Bailey (Prohibition) 3.2%
Indiana 7	William D. Bynum	Democratic	1884	Incumbent re-elected.	▌ ✓ William D. Bynum (Democratic) 51.3%; ▌ Addison C. Harris (Republican) 47.3%; ▌ B. M. Blount (Prohibition) 1.4%
Indiana 8	James T. Johnston	Republican	1884	Incumbent re-elected.	▌ ✓ James T. Johnston (Republican) 50.6%; ▌ John E. Lamb (Democratic) 47.9%; ▌ Thomas E. Ballard (Prohibition) 1.5%
Indiana 9	Thomas B. Ward	Democratic	1882	Incumbent retired. Republican gain.	▌ ✓ Joseph B. Cheadle (Republican) 53.0%; ▌ Benjamin F. Ham (Democratic) 44.9%; ▌ Charles E. Henry (Prohibition) 2.1%
Indiana 10	William D. Owen	Republican	1884	Incumbent re-elected.	▌ ✓ William D. Owen (Republican) 52.1%; ▌ Hiram D. Hattery (Democratic) 46.1%; ▌ J. W. Crawford (Prohibition) 0.9%
Indiana 11	George Washington Steele	Republican	1880	Incumbent re-elected.	▌ ✓ George Washington Steele (Republican) 48.9%; ▌ James C. Branyan (Democratic) 47.9%; ▌ John Ratliff (Prohibition) 3.2%
Indiana 12	Robert Lowry	Democratic	1882	Incumbent lost re-election. Republican gain.	▌ ✓ James Bain White (Republican) 51.8%; ▌ Robert Lowry (Democratic) 44.6%; ▌ John McPhail (Prohibition) 2.5%
Indiana 13	George Ford	Democratic	1884	Incumbent retired. Democratic hold.	▌ ✓ Benjamin F. Shively (Democratic) 50.5%; ▌ Jasper Packard (Republican) 47.8%; ▌ James M. Wickizer (Prohibition) 1.7%

== Iowa ==
District	Incumbent			This race	
District	Member	Party	First elected	Results	Candidates
Iowa 1	Benton Jay Hall	Democratic	1884	Incumbent lost re-election. Republican gain.	▌ ✓ John H. Gear (Republican) 51.1%; ▌ Benton Jay Hall (Democratic/Greenback) 47.8%
Iowa 2	Jeremiah H. Murphy	Democratic	1882	Incumbent lost renomination. Democratic hold.	▌ ✓ Walter I. Hayes (Democratic/Greenback) 48.0%; ▌ Thomas J. O'Meara (Labor) 27.0%; ▌ Samuel J. Kirkwood (Republican) 25.1%
Iowa 3	David B. Henderson	Republican	1882	Incumbent re-elected.	▌ ✓ David B. Henderson (Republican) 54.4%; ▌ W. H. Chamberlain (Democratic/Greenback) 45.6%
Iowa 4	William E. Fuller	Republican	1884	Incumbent re-elected.	▌ ✓ William E. Fuller (Republican) 53.0%; ▌ Willard C. Earle (Democratic/Greenback) 47.0%
Iowa 5	Benjamin T. Frederick	Democratic	1882	Incumbent lost re-election. Republican gain.	▌ ✓ Daniel Kerr (Republican) 51.0%; ▌ Benjamin T. Frederick (Democratic/Greenback) 48.8%
Iowa 6	James B. Weaver	Greenback	1884	Incumbent re-elected.	▌ ✓ James B. Weaver (Greenback/Democratic) 50.9%; ▌ John A. Donnell (Republican) 49.0%
Iowa 7	Edwin H. Conger	Republican	1884	Incumbent re-elected.	▌ ✓ Edwin H. Conger (Republican) 51.6%; ▌ W. L. Carpenter (Democratic/Greenback) 48.4%
Iowa 8	William P. Hepburn	Republican	1880	Incumbent lost re-election. Independent Republican gain.	▌ ✓ Albert R. Anderson (Ind. Rep./Dem./Greenback) 53.2%; ▌ William P. Hepburn (Republican) 46.7%
Iowa 9	Joseph Lyman	Republican	1884	Incumbent re-elected.	▌ ✓ Joseph Lyman (Republican) 53.4%; ▌ John H. Keatley (Democratic/Greenback) 46.5%
Iowa 10	Adoniram J. Holmes	Republican	1882	Incumbent re-elected.	▌ ✓ Adoniram J. Holmes (Republican) 56.6%; ▌ George Wilmot (Democratic/Greenback) 43.4%
Iowa 11	Isaac S. Struble	Republican	1882	Incumbent re-elected.	▌ ✓ Isaac S. Struble (Republican) 58.4%; ▌ E. C. Palmer (Democratic/Greenback) 41.5%

== Kansas ==
District	Incumbent			This race	
District	Member	Party	First elected	Results	Candidates
Kansas 1	Edmund N. Morrill	Republican	1882	Incumbent re-elected.	▌ ✓ Edmund N. Morrill (Republican) 55.3%; ▌ E. Brierer (Democratic) 44.1%; ▌ Thomas Scott (Prohibition) 0.4%
Kansas 2	Edward H. Funston	Republican	1884	Incumbent re-elected.	▌ ✓ Edward H. Funston (Republican) 51.9%; ▌ Charles L. Robinson (Democratic) 44.3%; ▌ I. O. Pickering (Prohibition) 3.8%
Kansas 3	Bishop W. Perkins	Republican	1882	Incumbent re-elected.	▌ ✓ Bishop W. Perkins (Republican) 53.4%; ▌ Frank Bacon (Democratic) 43.2%; ▌ J. W. Forest (Prohibition) 3.3%
Kansas 4	Thomas Ryan	Republican	1876	Incumbent re-elected.	▌ ✓ Thomas Ryan (Republican) 56.2%; ▌ John Martin (Democratic) 40.2%; ▌ R. L. Lotz (Prohibition) 3.6%
Kansas 5	John Alexander Anderson	Republican	1878	Incumbent re-elected as an Independent Republican; Independent Republican gain.	▌ ✓ John Alexander Anderson (Ind. Republican) 53.1%; ▌ J. G. Lowe (Democratic) 35.2%; ▌ A. S. Wilson (Republican) 10.6%; ▌ J. H. Lucas (Prohibition) 1.1%
Kansas 6	Lewis Hanback	Republican	1882	Incumbent lost renomination Republican hold.	▌ ✓ Erastus J. Turner (Republican) 58.5%; ▌ William S. Gile (Democratic) 33.9%; ▌ C. H. Moody (Anti-Monopoly) 6.3%; ▌ H. G. Breed (Prohibition) 1.3%
Kansas 7	Samuel R. Peters	Republican	1882	Incumbent re-elected.	▌ ✓ Samuel R. Peters (Republican) 56.2%; ▌ Thomas George (Democratic) 40.8%; ▌ W. B. Mayes (Prohibition) 2.4%

== Kentucky ==
District	Incumbent			This race	
District	Member	Party	First elected	Results	Candidates
Kentucky 1	William Johnson Stone	Democratic	1884	Incumbent re-elected.	▌ ✓ William Johnson Stone (Democratic) 53.4%; ▌ Oscar Turner (Independent Democratic) 46.5%
Kentucky 2	Polk Laffoon	Democratic	1884	Incumbent re-elected.	▌ ✓ Polk Laffoon (Democratic) 58.2%; ▌ George W. Jolly (Republican) 41.8%
Kentucky 3	John E. Halsell	Democratic	1882	Incumbent lost renomination. Republican gain.	▌ ✓ W. Godfrey Hunter (Republican) 51.8%; ▌ John S. Rhea (Democratic) 47.9%
Kentucky 4	Thomas A. Robertson	Democratic	1882	Incumbent lost renomination. Democratic hold.	▌ ✓ Alexander B. Montgomery (Democratic) 56.6%; ▌ J. D. Belden (Republican) 43.4%
Kentucky 5	Albert S. Willis	Democratic	1876	Incumbent lost renomination. Democratic hold.	▌ ✓ Asher G. Caruth (Democratic) 50.4%; ▌ Augustus E. Willson (Republican) 49.7%
Kentucky 6	John G. Carlisle	Democratic	1876	Incumbent re-elected.	▌ ✓ John G. Carlisle (Democratic) 53.3%; ▌ George H. Thoebe (Labor) 46.5%
Kentucky 7	W. C. P. Breckinridge	Democratic	1884	Incumbent re-elected.	▌ ✓ W. C. P. Breckinridge (Democratic) 99.7%
Kentucky 8	James B. McCreary	Democratic	1884	Incumbent re-elected.	▌ ✓ James B. McCreary (Democratic) 59.8%; ▌ Thomas Todd (Republican) 40.2%
Kentucky 9	William H. Wadsworth	Republican	1884	Incumbent retired. Republican hold.	▌ ✓ George M. Thomas (Republican) 50.3%; ▌ Garrett S. Wall (Democratic) 49.7%
Kentucky 10	William P. Taulbee	Democratic	1884	Incumbent re-elected.	▌ ✓ William P. Taulbee (Democratic) 51.6%; ▌ William L. Hurst (Republican) 48.4%
Kentucky 11	Frank Lane Wolford	Democratic	1882	Incumbent lost renomination. Republican gain.	▌ ✓ Hugh F. Finley (Republican) 53.2%; ▌ W. H. Botts (Democratic) 46.8%

== Louisiana ==
District	Incumbent			This race	
District	Member	Party	First elected	Results	Candidates
Louisiana 1	Louis St. Martin	Democratic	1884	Incumbent retired. Democratic hold.	▌ ✓ Theodore S. Wilkinson (Democratic) 87.3%; ▌ William M. Burwell (Republican) 12.7%
Louisiana 2	Nathaniel D. Wallace	Democratic	1886	Incumbent retired. Democratic hold.	▌ ✓ Matthew D. Lagan (Democratic) 53.7%; ▌ Andrew Hero Jr. (Republican) 44.3%
Louisiana 3	Edward J. Gay	Democratic	1884	Incumbent re-elected.	▌ ✓ Edward J. Gay (Democratic) 55.1%; ▌ Chester Bidwell Darrall (Republican) 43.6%
Louisiana 4	Newton C. Blanchard	Democratic	1880	Incumbent re-elected.	▌ ✓ Newton C. Blanchard (Democratic) 99.8%
Louisiana 5	J. Floyd King	Democratic	1878	Incumbent lost renomination. Democratic hold.	▌ ✓ Cherubusco Newton (Democratic) 95.6%; ▌ George L. Walton (Republican) 4.4%
Louisiana 6	Alfred Briggs Irion	Democratic	1884	Incumbent lost renomination. Democratic hold.	▌ ✓ Edward White Robertson (Democratic) 95.8%

== Maine ==
District	Incumbent			This race	
District	Member	Party	First elected	Results	Candidates
Maine 1	Thomas B. Reed	Republican	1876	Incumbent re-elected.	▌ ✓ Thomas B. Reed (Republican) 50.32%; ▌William H. Clifford (Democratic) 46.05%; ▌Timothy B. Hussey (Prohibition) 2.44%; ▌David O. Moulton (Labor) 1.20%
Maine 2	Nelson Dingley Jr.	Republican	1881 (special)	Incumbent re-elected.	▌ ✓ Nelson Dingley Jr. (Republican) 53.35%; ▌Alonzo Garcelon (Democratic) 35.06%; ▌William T. Eustis (Prohibition) 11.59%
Maine 3	Seth L. Milliken	Republican	1882	Incumbent re-elected.	▌ ✓ Seth L. Milliken (Republican) 57.06%; ▌Joseph E. Ladd (Democratic) 40.53%; ▌Henry H. Harvey (Prohibition) 2.41%
Maine 4	Charles A. Boutelle	Republican	1882	Incumbent re-elected.	▌ ✓ Charles A. Boutelle (Republican) 54.78%; ▌John F. Lynch (Democratic) 43.06%; ▌Charles S. Pritchard (Prohibition) 2.16%

== Maryland ==
District	Incumbent			This race	
District	Member	Party	First elected	Results	Candidates
Maryland 1	Charles H. Gibson	Democratic	1884	Incumbent re-elected.	▌ ✓ Charles H. Gibson (Democratic) 49.3%; ▌ Thomas S. Hodson (Republican) 44.8%; ▌ Lewis S. Melson (Prohibition) 5.9%
Maryland 2	Frank T. Shaw	Democratic	1884	Incumbent re-elected.	▌ ✓ Frank T. Shaw (Democratic) 55.5%; ▌ A. Marine (Republican) 38.6%; ▌ Peter G. Zouk (Prohibition) 5.9%
Maryland 3	William Hinson Cole	Democratic	1884	Incumbent died. Winner also elected to finish term. Democratic hold.	▌ ✓ Harry W. Rusk (Democratic) 72.3%; ▌ Henry A. Bosse (Republican/Labor) 17.5%; ▌ David W. Glass (Prohibition) 9.2%
Maryland 4	John Van Lear Findlay	Democratic	1882	Incumbent lost renomination and lost re-election as an independent. Democratic hold.	▌ ✓ Isidor Rayner (Democratic) 62.6%; ▌ John Van Lear Findlay (Independent) 30.6%; ▌ Eugene Levering (Prohibition) 6.7%
Maryland 5	Barnes Compton	Democratic	1884	Incumbent re-elected.	▌ ✓ Barnes Compton (Democratic) 54.8%; ▌ Washington G. Tuck (Republican) 43.8%; ▌ James P. Armstrong (Prohibition) 1.4%
Maryland 6	Louis E. McComas	Republican	1882	Incumbent re-elected.	▌ ✓ Louis E. McComas (Republican) 49.7%; ▌ L. Victor Baughman (Democratic) 48.5%; ▌ L. V. Mann (Prohibition) 1.8%

== Massachusetts ==
District	Incumbent			This race	
District	Member	Party	First elected	Results	Candidates
Massachusetts 1	Robert T. Davis	Republican	1882	Incumbent re-elected.	▌ ✓ Robert T. Davis (Republican) 58.74%; ▌George T. McLaughlin (Democratic) 35.98%; ▌Edward H. Hatfield (Prohibition) 5.28%
Massachusetts 2	John Davis Long	Republican	1882	Incumbent re-elected.	▌ ✓ John Davis Long (Republican) 52.38%; ▌Bushrod Morse (Democratic) 43.94%; ▌George W. Dyer (Prohibition) 3.68%
Massachusetts 3	Ambrose A. Ranney	Republican	1880	Incumbent lost re-election. Democratic gain.	▌ ✓ Leopold Morse (Democratic) 53.74%; ▌Ambrose A. Ranney (Republican) 45.29%; ▌Eugene H. Clapp (Prohibition) 0.98%
Massachusetts 4	Patrick A. Collins	Democratic	1882	Incumbent re-elected.	▌ ✓ Patrick A. Collins (Democratic) 73.61%; ▌William B. Cutler (Republican) 25.16%; ▌Charles G. Wood (Prohibition) 0.64%
Massachusetts 5	Edward D. Hayden	Republican	1884	Incumbent re-elected.	▌ ✓ Edward D. Hayden (Republican) 57.35%; ▌Charles L. Randall (Democratic) 40.41%; ▌Edward Kendall (Prohibition) 2.24%
Massachusetts 6	Henry B. Lovering	Democratic	1882	Incumbent lost re-election. Republican gain.	▌ ✓ Henry Cabot Lodge (Republican) 50.51%; ▌ Henry B. Lovering (Democratic) 47.79%; ▌ Castelln Norcross (Prohibition) 1.70%
Massachusetts 7	Eben F. Stone	Republican	1880	Incumbent retired. Republican hold.	▌ ✓ William Cogswell (Republican) 47.90%; ▌Jonas H. French (Democratic) 40.39%; ▌Willard Spaulding (Greenback/Prohibition) 12.67%
Massachusetts 8	Charles H. Allen	Republican	1884	Incumbent re-elected.	▌ ✓ Charles H. Allen (Republican) 50.26%; ▌John J. Donovan (Democratic) 47.65%; ▌Oliver M. Cousens (Prohibition) 2.09%
Massachusetts 9	Frederick D. Ely	Republican	1884	Incumbent lost re-election. Democratic gain.	▌ ✓ Edward Burnett (Democratic) 48.74%; ▌Frederick D. Ely (Republican) 47.75%; ▌Edmund M. Stowe (Prohibition) 3.51%
Massachusetts 10	William W. Rice	Republican	1876	Incumbent lost re-election. Democratic gain.	▌ ✓ John E. Russell (Democratic) 49.68%; ▌William W. Rice (Republican) 45.85%; ▌William H. Earle (Prohibition) 4.47%
Massachusetts 11	William Whiting II	Republican	1882	Incumbent re-elected.	▌ ✓ William Whiting II (Republican) 53.56%; ▌Festus C. Currier (Democratic) 39.93%; ▌Gardner A. Watkins (Prohibition) 6.51%
Massachusetts 12	Francis W. Rockwell	Republican	1884 (special)	Incumbent re-elected.	▌ ✓ Francis W. Rockwell (Republican) 49.56%; ▌Herbert C. Joyner (Democratic) 45.59%; ▌Henry Cutler (Prohibition) 4.85%

== Michigan ==
District	Incumbent			This race	
District	Member	Party	First elected	Results	Candidates
Michigan 1	William C. Maybury	Democratic	1882	Incumbent retired. Democratic hold.	▌ ✓ John Logan Chipman (Democratic) 51.01%; ▌Henry A. Robinson (Republican) 46.41%; ▌Charles A. Frisbee (Prohibition) 2.57%
Michigan 2	Nathaniel B. Eldredge	Democratic	1882	Incumbent retired. Republican gain.	▌ ✓ Edward P. Allen (Republican) 47.95%; ▌Lester H. Salsbury (Dem./Fusion) 44.95%; ▌Alfred O. Crozier (Prohibition) 7.11%
Michigan 3	James O'Donnell	Republican	1884	Incumbent re-elected.	▌ ✓ James O'Donnell (Republican) 51.43%; ▌Patrick Hankerd (Dem./Fusion) 39.43%; ▌Hiram D. Allen (Prohibition) 9.14%
Michigan 4	Julius C. Burrows	Republican	1872	Incumbent re-elected.	▌ ✓ Julius C. Burrows (Republican) 50.71%; ▌Harvey C. Sherwood (Dem./Fusion) 43.73%; ▌Jesse S. Boyden (Prohibition) 5.55%
Michigan 5	Charles C. Comstock	Democratic	1884	Incumbent retired. Democratic hold.	▌ ✓ Melbourne H. Ford (Democratic) 46.68%; ▌George W. McBride (Republican) 45.56%; ▌Edward L. Briggs (Prohibition) 7.76%
Michigan 6	Edwin B. Winans	Democratic	1882	Incumbent retired. Republican gain.	▌ ✓ Mark S. Brewer (Republican) 48.06%; ▌John H. Fedewa (Democratic) 43.29%; ▌Azariah S. Partridge (Prohibition) 8.65%
Michigan 7	Ezra C. Carleton	Democratic	1882	Incumbent retired. Democratic hold.	▌ ✓ Justin R. Whiting (Dem./Fusion) 48.63%; ▌John P. Sanborn (Republican) 45.75%; ▌William F. Clark (Prohibition) 5.62%
Michigan 8	Timothy E. Tarsney	Democratic	1884	Incumbent re-elected.	▌ ✓ Timothy E. Tarsney (Democratic) 48.36%; ▌Roswell G. Horr (Republican) 46.54%; ▌George W. Abbey (Prohibition) 5.10%
Michigan 9	Byron M. Cutcheon	Republican	1882	Incumbent re-elected.	▌ ✓ Byron M. Cutcheon (Republican) 50.94%; ▌Lyman G. Mason (Dem./Fusion) 41.99%; ▌Lathrop S. Ellis (Prohibition) 7.08%
Michigan 10	Spencer O. Fisher	Democratic	1884	Incumbent re-elected.	▌ ✓ Spencer O. Fisher (Dem./Fusion) 51.37%; ▌Henry M. Loud (Republican) 44.04%; ▌David A. Ross (Prohibition) 4.60%
Michigan 11	Seth C. Moffatt	Republican	1884	Incumbent re-elected.	▌ ✓ Seth C. Moffatt (Republican) 53.61%; ▌John Powers (Democratic) 45.31%; ▌Theron E. Carpenter (Prohibition) 1.08%

== Minnesota ==
District	Incumbent			This race	
District	Member	Party	First elected	Results	Candidates
Minnesota 1	Milo White	Republican	1882	Incumbent retired. Democratic gain.	▌ ✓ Thomas Wilson (Democratic) 52.0%; ▌John A. Lovely (Republican) 43.6%; ▌Daniel H. Roberts (Prohibition) 4.3%
Minnesota 2	James Wakefield	Republican	1882	Incumbent retired. Republican hold.	▌ ✓ John Lind (Republican) 59.8%; ▌A. H. Bullis (Democratic) 34.6%; ▌George J. Day (Prohibition) 5.5%
Minnesota 3	Horace B. Strait	Republican	1880	Incumbent retired. Democratic gain.	▌ ✓ John L. MacDonald (Democratic) 50.3%; ▌Benjamin Herbert (Republican) 46.7%; ▌Noah Lathrop (Prohibition) 3.0%
Minnesota 4	John Gilfillan	Republican	1884	Incumbent lost re-election. Democratic gain.	▌ ✓ Edmund Rice (Democratic) 52.4%; ▌John Gilfillan (Republican) 44.5%; ▌Lyman Denton (Prohibition) 3.1%
Minnesota 5	Knute Nelson	Republican	1882	Incumbent re-elected.	▌ ✓ Knute Nelson (Republican) 97.0%; ▌John Henry Long (Prohibition) 2.7%

== Mississippi ==
District	Incumbent			This race	
District	Member	Party	First elected	Results	Candidates
Mississippi 1	John M. Allen	Democratic	1884	Incumbent re-elected.	▌ ✓ John M. Allen (Democratic) 99.15%; Scattering 0.85%
Mississippi 2	James B. Morgan	Democratic	1884	Incumbent re-elected.	▌ ✓ James B. Morgan (Democratic) 62.12%; ▌James R. Chalmers (Republican) 37.88%
Mississippi 3	Thomas C. Catchings	Democratic	1884	Incumbent re-elected.	▌ ✓ Thomas C. Catchings (Democratic) 65.48%; ▌H. F. Simrall (Republican) 34.52%
Mississippi 4	Frederick G. Barry	Democratic	1884	Incumbent re-elected.	▌ ✓ Frederick G. Barry (Democratic) 96.05%; Scattering 3.95%
Mississippi 5	Otho R. Singleton	Democratic	1874	Incumbent retired. Democratic hold.	▌ ✓ Chapman L. Anderson (Democratic) 99.37%; Scattering 0.63%
Mississippi 6	Henry S. Van Eaton	Democratic	1882	Incumbent retired. Democratic hold.	▌ ✓ T. R. Stockdale (Democratic) 68.41%; ▌John R. Lynch (Republican) 31.59%
Mississippi 7	Ethelbert Barksdale	Democratic	1882	Incumbent lost renomination. Democratic hold.	▌ ✓ Charles E. Hooker (Democratic) 100%

== Missouri ==
District	Incumbent			This race	
District	Member	Party	First elected	Results	Candidates
Missouri 1	William H. Hatch	Democratic	1878	Incumbent re-elected.	▌ ✓ William H. Hatch (Democratic) 54.5%; ▌ William P. Harrison (Republican) 45.5%
Missouri 2	John B. Hale	Democratic	1884	Incumbent lost renomination and lost re-election as an independent. Democratic hold.	▌ ✓ Charles H. Mansur (Democratic) 49.2%; ▌ John B. Hale (Independent Democratic) 47.1%; ▌ William Quayle (Greenback) 3.7%
Missouri 3	Alexander M. Dockery	Democratic	1882	Incumbent re-elected.	▌ ✓ Alexander M. Dockery (Democratic) 56.0%; ▌ Joseph T. Harwood (Republican) 43.6%; ▌ John F. Jordan (Greenback) 0.4%
Missouri 4	James N. Burnes	Democratic	1882	Incumbent re-elected.	▌ ✓ James N. Burnes (Democratic) 53.2%; ▌ Byron A. Dunn (Republican) 45.3%; ▌ W. H. Blake (Prohibition) 0.5%
Missouri 5	William Warner	Republican	1884	Incumbent re-elected.	▌ ✓ William Warner (Republican) 50.9%; ▌ John Finis Philips (Democratic) 48.4%; ▌ J. H. Hughes (Prohibition) 0.7%
Missouri 6	John T. Heard	Democratic	1884	Incumbent re-elected.	▌ ✓ John T. Heard (Democratic) 53.6%; ▌ Odon Guitar (Republican) 46.4%
Missouri 7	John E. Hutton	Democratic	1884	Incumbent re-elected.	▌ ✓ John E. Hutton (Democratic) 53.7%; ▌ John R. Martin (Republican) 46.3%
Missouri 8	John J. O'Neill	Democratic	1882	Incumbent re-elected.	▌ ✓ John J. O'Neill (Democratic) 47.8%; ▌ James K. Cumings (Republican) 39.8%; ▌ Eckhard Wind (Union Labor) 11.9%; ▌ James H. Harris (Prohibition) 0.5%
Missouri 9	John Milton Glover	Democratic	1884	Incumbent re-elected.	▌ ✓ John Milton Glover (Democratic) 44.3%; ▌ Nathan Frank (Republican) 43.7%; ▌ George W. Davisson (Union Labor) 11.0%; ▌ William C. Wilson (Prohibition) 0.9%
Missouri 10	Martin L. Clardy	Democratic	1878	Incumbent re-elected.	▌ ✓ Martin L. Clardy (Democratic) 45.0%; ▌ Frederick W. Lederberger (Republican) 41.3%; ▌ Michael J. Ratchford (Union Labor) 13.4%; ▌ Emerson R. Grant (Prohibition) 0.4%
Missouri 11	Richard P. Bland	Democratic	1872	Incumbent re-elected.	▌ ✓ Richard P. Bland (Democratic) 54.3%; ▌ Louis T. Parker (Republican) 45.8%
Missouri 12	William J. Stone	Democratic	1884	Incumbent re-elected.	▌ ✓ William J. Stone (Democratic) 53.9%; ▌ Elbert E. Kimball (Republican) 44.5%; ▌ R. G. Hartwell (Prohibition) 1.6%
Missouri 13	William H. Wade	Republican	1884	Incumbent re-elected.	▌ ✓ William H. Wade (Republican) 51.8%; ▌ Jeremiah C. Cravens (Democratic) 44.9%; ▌ John Sobicski (Greenback) 3.3%
Missouri 14	William Dawson	Democratic	1884	Incumbent lost renomination. Democratic hold.	▌ ✓ James P. Walker (Democratic) 63.6%; ▌ Hugh Davidson (Republican/Greenback) 36.4%

== Montana Territory ==
See Non-voting delegates, below.

== Nebraska ==
District	Incumbent			This race	
District	Member	Party	First elected	Results	Candidates
Nebraska 1	Archibald J. Weaver	Republican	1882	Incumbent retired. Democratic gain.	▌ ✓ John A. McShane (Democratic) 54.87%; ▌Church Howe (Republican) 38.40%; ▌George Bigelow (Prohibition) 6.72%
Nebraska 2	James Laird	Republican	1882	Incumbent re-elected.	▌ ✓ James Laird (Republican) 51.30%; ▌William A. McKeighan (Democratic) 39.16%; ▌C. S. Harrison (Prohibition) 9.09%; Scattering 0.45%
Nebraska 3	George W. E. Dorsey	Republican	1884	Incumbent re-elected.	▌ ✓ George W. E. Dorsey (Republican) 55.06%; ▌W. H. Webster (Democratic) 40.16%; ▌W. J. Olinger (Prohibition) 4.57%; Scattering 0.22%

== Nevada ==
District	Incumbent			This race	
District	Member	Party	First elected	Results	Candidates
Nevada at-large	William Woodburn	Republican	1884	Incumbent re-elected.	▌ ✓ William Woodburn (Republican) 54.2%; ▌ J. H. MacMillan (Democratic) 45.8%

== New Hampshire ==
District	Incumbent			This race	
District	Member	Party	First elected	Results	Candidates
New Hampshire 1	Martin A. Haynes	Republican	1882	Incumbent lost re-election. Democratic gain.	▌ ✓ Luther F. McKinney (Democratic) 49.1%; ▌ Martin A. Haynes (Republican) 48.5%; ▌ Daniel C. Knowles (Prohibition) 2.3%
New Hampshire 2	Jacob H. Gallinger	Republican	1884	Incumbent re-elected.	▌ ✓ Jacob H. Gallinger (Republican) 49.8%; ▌ William W. Bailey (Democratic) 46.9%; ▌ Josiah M. Fletcher (Prohibition) 3.1%

== New Jersey ==
District	Incumbent			This race	
District	Member	Party	First elected	Results	Candidates
New Jersey 1	George Hires	Republican	1884	Incumbent re-elected.	▌ ✓ George Hires (Republican) 49.0%; ▌ Ebenezer Westcott (Democratic) 40.1%; ▌ William H. Nicholson (Prohibition) 10.9%
New Jersey 2	James Buchanan	Republican	1884	Incumbent re-elected.	▌ ✓ James Buchanan (Republican) 50.2%; ▌ Elias S. Reed (Democratic) 42.6%; ▌ Leonard Brown (Prohibition) 7.2%
New Jersey 3	Robert S. Green	Democratic	1884	Incumbent retired to run for governor. Republican gain.	▌ ✓ John Kean (Republican) 46.5%; ▌ [FNU] McMahon (Democratic) 44.6%; ▌ Cortlandt Parker (Prohibition) 8.9%
New Jersey 4	James N. Pidcock	Democratic	1884	Incumbent re-elected.	▌ ✓ James N. Pidcock (Democratic) 44.9%; ▌ L. Van Blarcom (Republican) 44.4%; ▌ William H. Morrow (Prohibition) 10.7%
New Jersey 5	William Walter Phelps	Republican	1882	Incumbent re-elected.	▌ ✓ William Walter Phelps (Republican) 51.8%; ▌ [FNU] Skinner (Democratic) 42.2%; ▌ Charles A. Church (Prohibition) 6.0%
New Jersey 6	Herman Lehlbach	Republican	1884	Incumbent re-elected.	▌ ✓ Herman Lehlbach (Republican) 40.8%; ▌ Joseph E. Haynes (Democratic) 36.1%; ▌ [FNU] Beckmeyer (Labor) 16.7%; ▌ John R. Anderson (Prohibition) 6.4%
New Jersey 7	William McAdoo	Democratic	1882	Incumbent re-elected.	▌ ✓ William McAdoo (Democratic) 49.7%; ▌ Siegfried Hammerschlag (Republican) 36.2%; ▌ Edwin J. Kerr (Independent Democratic) 11.6%; ▌ Thomas J. Kennedy (Prohibition) 2.4%

== New Mexico Territory ==
See Non-voting delegates, below.

== New York ==
District	Incumbent			This race	
District	Member	Party	First elected	Results	Candidates
New York 1	Perry Belmont	Democratic	1880	Incumbent re-elected,	▌ ✓ Perry Belmont (Democratic) 50.0%; ▌ Richard C. McCormick (Republican) 47.1%; ▌ William A. Layton (Prohibition) 2.9%
New York 2	Felix Campbell	Democratic	1882	Incumbent re-elected.	▌ ✓ Felix Campbell (Democratic) 70.8%; ▌ James Donovan (Republican) 23.7%; ▌ John H. Sillick (Prohibition) 4.3%; ▌ I. Frederick Miller (Independent) 1.2%
New York 3	Darwin R. James	Republican	1882	Incumbent retired. Republican hold.	▌ ✓ Stephen V. White (Republican) 48.6%; ▌ James D. Bell (Democratic) 48.0%; ▌ Alfred A. Robbins (Prohibition) 3.4%
New York 4	Peter P. Mahoney	Democratic	1884	Incumbent re-elected.	▌ ✓ Peter P. Mahoney (Democratic) 53.6%; ▌ Eugene F. O'Connor (Republican) 39.6%; ▌ William Erigena Robinson (Independent Democratic) 4.9%; ▌ Alexander F. Robertson (Prohibition) 1.9%
New York 5	Archibald M. Bliss	Democratic	1884	Incumbent re-elected.	▌ ✓ Archibald M. Bliss (Democratic) 50.1%; ▌ William H. Waters (Republican) 48.0%; ▌ Christian H. Mitchell (Prohibition) 1.9%
New York 6	Nicholas Muller	Democratic	1882	Incumbent retired. Democratic hold.	▌ ✓ Amos J. Cummings (Democratic) 96.4%; ▌ Timothy L. Murphy (Independent) 2.6%; ▌ Joseph A. Bogardus (Prohibition) 1.0%
New York 7	John J. Adams	Democratic	1882	Incumbent retired. Democratic hold.	▌ ✓ Lloyd Bryce (Democratic) 64.2%; ▌ John F. Lawson (Republican) 34.7%; ▌ John F. Shorey (Prohibition) 1.1%
New York 8	Timothy J. Campbell	Democratic	1885	Incumbent re-elected.	▌ ✓ Timothy J. Campbell (Democratic) 50.4%; ▌ Thomas F. Grady (Independent Democratic) 48.8%; ▌ Timothy N. Holden (Prohibition) 0.8%
New York 9	Joseph Pulitzer	Democratic	1884	Incumbent resigned. Winner also elected to finish term. Democratic hold.	▌ ✓ Samuel S. Cox (Democratic) 62.3%; ▌ August P. Wagener (Republican) 37.4%; ▌ Erasmus D. Garnsey (Prohibition) 0.3%
New York 10	Abram Hewitt	Democratic	1880	Incumbent resigned to become Mayor of New York City. Democratic hold.	▌ ✓ Francis B. Spinola (Democratic) 50.7%; ▌ Allen J. Rice (Republican) 48.2%; ▌ Melville T. Bovarde (Prohibition) 1.1%
New York 11	Truman A. Merriman	Independent Democratic	1884	Incumbent re-elected as a Democratic candidate. Democratic gain.	▌ ✓ Truman A. Merriman (Democratic) 97.8%; ▌ Henry B. Slawson (Prohibition) 1.2%; ▌ Henry Walker (Independent) 1.0%
New York 12	Abraham Dowdney	Democratic	1884	Incumbent resigned. Democratic hold.	▌ ✓ William Bourke Cockran (Democratic) 59.3%; ▌ George H. Pell (Republican) 39.9%; ▌ James M. Gano (Prohibition) 0.8%
New York 13	Egbert Ludovicus Viele	Democratic	1884	Incumbent lost re-election. Republican gain.	▌ ✓ Ashbel P. Fitch (Republican) 55.3%; ▌ Egbert Ludovicus Viele (Democratic) 43.8%; ▌ William J. Gilmore (Prohibition) 0.9%
New York 14	William G. Stahlnecker	Democratic	1884	Incumbent re-elected.	▌ ✓ William G. Stahlnecker (Democratic) 52.3%; ▌ James Wood (Republican) 44.3%; ▌ Jesse H. Griffin (Prohibition) 3.4%
New York 15	Lewis Beach	Democratic	1880	Incumbent died. Winner also elected to finish term. Democratic hold.	▌ ✓ Henry Bacon (Democratic) 48.7%; ▌ Moses D. Stivers (Republican) 47.0%; ▌ Alonzo P. Wheeler (Prohibition) 4.3%
New York 16	John H. Ketcham	Republican	1876	Incumbent re-elected.	▌ ✓ John H. Ketcham (Republican) 55.2%; ▌ Leonard B. Sackett (Democratic) 41.0%; ▌ Walter J. Farrington (Prohibition) 3.8%
New York 17	James Girard Lindsley	Republican	1884	Incumbent retired. Republican hold.	▌ ✓ Stephen T. Hopkins (Republican) 52.3%; ▌ James P. Lounsberry (Democratic) 42.1%; ▌ William M. Howie (Prohibition) 5.5%
New York 18	Henry G. Burleigh	Republican	1882	Incumbent lost re-election. Democratic gain.	▌ ✓ Edward W. Greenman (Democratic) 49.8%; ▌ Henry G. Burleigh (Republican) 46.1%; ▌ Nathaniel B. Powers (Prohibition) 4.1%
New York 19	John Swinburne	Republican	1884	Incumbent lost re-election. Democratic gain.	▌ ✓ Nicholas T. Kane (Democratic) 47.8%; ▌ John Swinburne (Republican) 47.3%; ▌ August Kessler (Independent) 3.7%; ▌ John C. Sanford (Prohibition) 1.2%
New York 20	George West	Republican	1884	Incumbent re-elected.	▌ ✓ George West (Republican) 54.7%; ▌ Harvey Wick (Democratic) 33.6%; ▌ Walton W. French (Prohibition) 11.2%
New York 21	Frederick A. Johnson	Republican	1882	Incumbent retired. Republican hold.	▌ ✓ John H. Moffitt (Republican) 68.4%; ▌ Ebenezer S. Winslow (Democratic) 26.9%; ▌ Adam Armstrong (Prohibition) 4.7%
New York 22	Abraham X. Parker	Republican	1880	Incumbent re-elected.	▌ ✓ Abraham X. Parker (Republican) 57.5%; ▌ Amasa Corbin (Democratic) 36.3%; ▌ John D. Huntington (Prohibition) 6.1%
New York 23	John T. Spriggs	Democratic	1882	Incumbent lost re-election. Republican gain.	▌ ✓ James S. Sherman (Republican) 49.2%; ▌ John T. Spriggs (Democratic) 44.6%; ▌ Horatio S. Hendee (Prohibition) 6.1%
New York 24	John S. Pindar	Democratic	1884	Incumbent retired. Republican gain.	▌ ✓ David Wilber (Republican) 50.3%; ▌ George W. Smith (Democratic) 44.9%; ▌ Charles A. Gleason (Prohibition) 4.7%
New York 25	Frank Hiscock	Republican	1876	Incumbent re-elected.	▌ ✓ Frank Hiscock (Republican) 58.2%; ▌ Jerome Angel (Democratic) 41.6%
New York 26	Stephen C. Millard	Republican	1882	Incumbent retired. Republican hold.	▌ ✓ Milton De Lano (Republican) 55.3%; ▌ Francis W. Downs (Democratic) 35.7%; ▌ Dwight Williams (Prohibition) 8.9%
New York 27	Sereno E. Payne	Republican	1882	Incumbent retired. Republican hold.	▌ ✓ Newton W. Nutting (Republican) 60.7%; ▌ William C. Beardsley (Democratic) 33.0%; ▌ Robert B. Howland (Prohibition) 3.9%; ▌ Edward Ross (Independent) 2.4%
New York 28	John Arnot Jr.	Democratic	1882	Incumbent died. Republican gain.	▌ ✓ Thomas S. Flood (Republican) 52.3%; ▌ Jeremiah McGuire (Democratic) 43.0%; ▌ Orlando S. Groom (Prohibition) 4.7%
New York 29	Ira Davenport	Republican	1884	Incumbent re-elected.	▌ ✓ Ira Davenport (Republican) 82.8%; ▌ Hiram Ladd (Democratic) 14.6%; ▌ William R. Hunt (Prohibition) 2.6%
New York 30	Charles S. Baker	Republican	1884	Incumbent re-elected.	▌ ✓ Charles S. Baker (Republican) 53.2%; ▌ Theodore Bacon (Democratic) 42.5%; ▌ John A. Copeland (Prohibition) 4.3%
New York 31	John G. Sawyer	Republican	1884	Incumbent re-elected.	▌ ✓ John G. Sawyer (Republican) 54.3%; ▌ Charles F. Wadsworth (Democratic) 37.2%; ▌ Charles B. Sparrow (Prohibition) 8.5%
New York 32	John McCreath Farquhar	Republican	1884	Incumbent re-elected.	▌ ✓ John McCreath Farquhar (Republican) 55.2%; ▌ William Findlay Rogers (Democratic) 44.2%; ▌ William Clothier (Prohibition) 0.6%
New York 33	John B. Weber	Republican	1884	Incumbent re-elected.	▌ ✓ John B. Weber (Republican) 49.3%; ▌ Austin Spaulding (Democratic) 44.7%; ▌ George P. Smith (Prohibition) 5.9%
New York 34	Walter L. Sessions	Republican	1884	Incumbent lost renomination. Republican hold.	▌ ✓ William G. Laidlaw (Republican) 52.8%; ▌ Staley N. Wood (Democratic) 28.9%; ▌ DeWitt C. Huntington (Prohibition) 17.1%; ▌ William Hartson (Independent) 1.2%

== North Carolina ==
District	Incumbent			This race	
District	Member	Party	First elected	Results	Candidates
North Carolina 1	Thomas Gregory Skinner	Democratic	1883	Incumbent lost renomination. Democratic hold.	▌ ✓ Louis C. Latham (Democratic) 54.6%; ▌ Lycurgus J. Barrett (Independent Republican) 43.4%; ▌ G.D. Langston (Prohibition) 2.0%
North Carolina 2	James E. O'Hara	Republican	1882	Incumbent lost re-election. Democratic gain.	▌ ✓ F. M. Simmons (Democratic) 44.8%; ▌ James E. O'Hara (Republican) 38.6%; ▌ Israel Abbott (Independent Republican) 14.9%
North Carolina 3	Wharton J. Green	Democratic	1882	Incumbent lost renomination. Democratic hold.	▌ ✓ Charles W. McClammy (Democratic) 60.7%; ▌ F. D. Koonce (Republican) 34.1%
North Carolina 4	William Ruffin Cox	Democratic	1880	Incumbent lost renomination. Independent gain.	▌ ✓ John Nichols (Independent) 52.4%; ▌ John W. Graham (Democratic) 47.6%
North Carolina 5	James W. Reid	Democratic	1885	Incumbent lost re-election and resigned. Republican gain.	▌ ✓ John M. Brower (Republican) 49.7%; ▌ James W. Reid (Democratic) 43.8%; ▌ John R. Winston (Greenback) 4.4%; ▌ James M. Winsted (Prohibition) 2.1%
North Carolina 6	Risden Tyler Bennett	Democratic	1882	Incumbent retired. Democratic hold.	▌ ✓ Alfred Rowland (Democratic) 62.5%; ▌ Charles R. Jones (Independent) 33.6%
North Carolina 7	John S. Henderson	Democratic	1884	Incumbent re-elected.	▌ ✓ John S. Henderson (Democratic) 78.6%; ▌ Joseph A. Blair (Republican) 11.0%; ▌ James E. Walker (Prohibition) 10.4%
North Carolina 8	William H. H. Cowles	Democratic	1884	Incumbent re-elected.	▌ ✓ William H. H. Cowles (Democratic) 65.2%; ▌ Leander L. Green (Republican) 34.7%
North Carolina 9	Thomas D. Johnston	Democratic	1884	Incumbent re-elected.	▌ ✓ Thomas D. Johnston (Democratic) 54.2%; ▌ William H. Malone (Independent Republican) 32.3%; ▌ Alexander H. Jones (Republican) 13.5%

== Ohio ==
District	Incumbent			This race	
District	Member	Party	First elected	Results	Candidates
Ohio 1	Benjamin Butterworth	Republican	1884	Incumbent re-elected.	▌ ✓ Benjamin Butterworth (Republican) 53.4%; ▌ Samuel A. Miller (Democratic) 45.3%; ▌ Henry T. Ogden (Prohibition) 1.2%
Ohio 2	Charles Elwood Brown	Republican	1884	Incumbent re-elected.	▌ ✓ Charles Elwood Brown (Republican) 52.3%; ▌ Hugh Shiels (Democratic) 46.8%; ▌ Leonidas E. Brown (Prohibition) 0.9%
Ohio 3	None (new district)			New seat. Republican gain.	▌ ✓ Elihu S. Williams (Republican) 47.1%; ▌ Robert M. Murray (Democratic) 44.0%; ▌ Jacob W. Nigh (Labor) 5.8%; ▌ Leonidas E. Brown (Prohibition) 3.1%
Ohio 4	Charles Marley Anderson	Democratic	1884	Incumbent lost renomination. Democratic hold.	▌ ✓ Samuel S. Yoder (Democratic) 59.2%; ▌ Theodore W. Brotherton (Republican) 37.5%; ▌ C.B. Hickernell (Prohibition) 3.0%; ▌ [FNU] Alexander (Labor) 0.3%
Ohio 4	Benjamin Le Fevre; Redistricted from the 5th district	Democratic	1878	Incumbent retired. Democratic loss.	▌ ✓ Samuel S. Yoder (Democratic) 59.2%; ▌ Theodore W. Brotherton (Republican) 37.5%; ▌ C.B. Hickernell (Prohibition) 3.0%; ▌ [FNU] Alexander (Labor) 0.3%
Ohio 5	George E. Seney; Redistricted from the 7th district	Democratic	1882	Incumbent re-elected.	▌ ✓ George E. Seney (Democratic) 70.8%; ▌ David Harpster (Republican) 20.9%; ▌ Rudolph Rock (Prohibition) 6.8%
Ohio 6	William D. Hill	Democratic	1882	Incumbent lost re-election. Republican gain.	▌ ✓ Melvin M. Boothman (Republican) 50.0%; ▌ William D. Hill (Democratic) 46.5%; ▌ John W. Roseborough (Prohibition) 3.5%
Ohio 7	James E. Campbell; Redistricted from the 3rd district	Democratic	1882	Incumbent re-elected.	▌ ✓ James E. Campbell (Democratic) 48.4%; ▌ John Little (Republican) 48.4%; ▌ Charles F. Chapman (Prohibition) 3.1%
Ohio 7	John Little; Redistricted from the 8th district	Republican	1884	Incumbent lost re-election. Republican loss.	▌ ✓ James E. Campbell (Democratic) 48.4%; ▌ John Little (Republican) 48.4%; ▌ Charles F. Chapman (Prohibition) 3.1%
Ohio 8	None (new district)			New seat. Republican gain.	▌ ✓ Robert P. Kennedy (Republican) 49.6%; ▌ Thomas R. McMillen (Democratic) 45.8%; ▌ William H. Morgan (Prohibition) 4.6%
Ohio 9	William C. Cooper	Republican	1884	Incumbent re-elected.	▌ ✓ William C. Cooper (Republican) 49.8%; ▌ John C. Levering (Democratic) 44.6%; ▌ William H. Elsom (Prohibition) 5.4%
Ohio 10	Jacob Romeis	Republican	1884	Incumbent re-elected.	▌ ✓ Jacob Romeis (Republican) 51.7%; ▌ Frank H. Hurd (Democratic) 46.9%; ▌ George W. Hayes (Prohibition) 1.4%
Ohio 11	Albert C. Thompson; Redistricted from the 12th district	Republican	1884	Incumbent re-elected.	▌ ✓ Albert C. Thompson (Republican) 55.3%; ▌ Irvin Dugan (Democratic) 41.6%; ▌ J.S. Witherspoon (Prohibition) 3.0%
Ohio 12	William W. Ellsberry; Redistricted from the 11th district	Democratic	1884	Incumbent retired. Republican gain.	▌ ✓ Jacob J. Pugsley (Republican) 49.6%; ▌ James W. Denver (Democratic) 46.2%; ▌ Martin Redkey (Prohibition) 4.1%
Ohio 13	Joseph H. Outhwaite	Democratic	1884	Incumbent re-elected.	▌ ✓ Joseph H. Outhwaite (Democratic) 51.7%; ▌ William Shepard (Republican) 45.1%; ▌ John H. Hann (Prohibition) 3.2%
Ohio 14	George W. Geddes; Redistricted from the 16th district	Democratic	1878	Incumbent retired. Republican gain.	▌ ✓ Charles P. Wickham (Republican) 49.1%; ▌ Thomas G. Bristor (Democratic) 45.3%; ▌ Corydon L. Tambling (Prohibition) 5.6%
Ohio 15	Charles H. Grosvenor; Redistricted from the 14th district	Republican	1884	Incumbent re-elected.	▌ ✓ Charles H. Grosvenor (Republican) 51.0%; ▌ Adoniram J. Warner (Democratic) 46.3%; ▌ John J. Mills (Prohibition) 2.7%
Ohio 15	Adoniram J. Warner; Redistricted from the 17th district	Democratic	1882	Incumbent lost re-election. Democratic loss.	▌ ✓ Charles H. Grosvenor (Republican) 51.0%; ▌ Adoniram J. Warner (Democratic) 46.3%; ▌ John J. Mills (Prohibition) 2.7%
Ohio 16	Beriah Wilkins; Redistricted from the 15th district	Democratic	1882	Incumbent re-elected.	▌ ✓ Beriah Wilkins (Democratic) 53.3%; ▌ Caleb B. Downs (Republican) 42.8%; ▌ James M. Scott (Prohibition) 3.5%
Ohio 17	None (new district)			New seat. Republican gain.	▌ ✓ Joseph D. Taylor (Republican) 52.4%; ▌ David C. Kennon (Democratic) 41.7%; ▌ James Monroe (Prohibition) 5.8%
Ohio 18	William McKinley; Redistricted from the 20th district	Republican	1884	Incumbent re-elected.	▌ ✓ William McKinley (Republican) 49.1%; ▌ Wallace H. Phelps (Democratic) 42.4%; ▌ Isaiah Hann (Prohibition) 4.8%
Ohio 18	Isaac H. Taylor	Republican	1884	Incumbent retired. Republican loss.	▌ ✓ William McKinley (Republican) 49.1%; ▌ Wallace H. Phelps (Democratic) 42.4%; ▌ Isaiah Hann (Prohibition) 4.8%
Ohio 19	Ezra B. Taylor	Republican	1880	Incumbent re-elected.	▌ ✓ Ezra B. Taylor (Republican) 63.2%; ▌ Thaddeus E. Hoyt (Democratic) 28.0%; ▌ Charles E. Holt (Prohibition) 8.2%
Ohio 20	None (new district)			New seat. Republican gain.	▌ ✓ George W. Crouse (Republican) 48.5%; ▌ William Dorsey (Democratic) 45.8%; ▌ John J. Ashenhurst (Prohibition) 5.6%
Ohio 21	Martin A. Foran	Democratic	1882	Incumbent re-elected.	▌ ✓ Martin A. Foran (Democratic) 51.2%; ▌ Amos Townsend (Republican) 46.3%; ▌ George L. Case (Prohibition) 2.4%

== Oregon ==
District	Incumbent			This race	
District	Member	Party	First elected	Results	Candidates
Oregon at-large	Binger Hermann	Republican	1884	Incumbent re-elected.	▌ ✓ Binger Hermann (Republican) 49.0%; ▌ N. L. Butler (Democratic) 46.0%; ▌ G.M. Miller (Prohibition) 5.0%

== Pennsylvania ==
District	Incumbent			This race	
District	Member	Party	First elected	Results	Candidates
Pennsylvania 1	Henry H. Bingham	Republican	1878	Incumbent re-elected.	▌ ✓ Henry H. Bingham (Republican) 60.0%; ▌ Michael J. Ryan (Democratic) 38.9%; ▌ Lewis H. Lane (Prohibition) 1.1%
Pennsylvania 2	Charles O'Neill	Republican	1872	Incumbent re-elected.	▌ ✓ Charles O'Neill (Republican) 59.9%; ▌ C. Oscar Beasley (Democratic) 38.1%; ▌ Jacob Grim (Prohibition) 2.0%
Pennsylvania 3	Samuel J. Randall	Democratic	1862	Incumbent re-elected.	▌ ✓ Samuel J. Randall (Democratic) 98.4%; ▌ Frederick Halterman (Prohibition) 1.6%
Pennsylvania 4	William D. Kelley	Republican	1860	Incumbent re-elected.	▌ ✓ William D. Kelley (Republican) 62.7%; ▌ William A. Laverty (Democratic) 34.3%; ▌ Eugene M. Aaron (Prohibition) 3.1%
Pennsylvania 5	Alfred C. Harmer	Republican	1876	Incumbent re-elected.	▌ ✓ Alfred C. Harmer (Republican) 57.4%; ▌ Walter G. Smith (Democratic) 30.1%; ▌ Frederick A. Herwig (Labor) 10.2%; ▌ James Magee (Prohibition) 2.3%
Pennsylvania 6	James B. Everhart	Republican	1882	Incumbent lost renomination and lost re-election as an Independent Republican candidate. Republican hold.	▌ ✓ Smedley Darlington (Republican) 41.4%; ▌ O. B. Dickinson (Democratic) 36.8%; ▌ James B. Everhart (Independent Republican) 17.4%; ▌ E. P. Marshall (Prohibition) 4.4%
Pennsylvania 7	Isaac Newton Evans	Republican	1882	Incumbent retired. Republican hold.	▌ ✓ Robert M. Yardley (Republican) 52.0%; ▌ Edwin L. Satterthwaite (Democratic) 45.5%; ▌ Oliver H. Holcomb (Prohibition) 2.5%
Pennsylvania 8	Daniel Ermentrout	Democratic	1880	Incumbent re-elected.	▌ ✓ Daniel Ermentrout (Democratic) 59.6%; ▌ George D. Sitzel (Republican) 39.0%; ▌ Jeremiah Beard (Prohibition) 1.4%
Pennsylvania 9	John A. Hiestand	Republican	1884	Incumbent re-elected,	▌ ✓ John A. Hiestand (Republican) 65.7%; ▌ Edward McGovern (Democratic) 31.8%; ▌ N. S. Wolle (Prohibition) 2.5%
Pennsylvania 10	William H. Sowden	Democratic	1884	Incumbent re-elected.	▌ ✓ William H. Sowden (Democratic) 96.8%; ▌ Simeon B. Chase (Prohibition) 3.2%
Pennsylvania 11	John B. Storm	Democratic	1882	Incumbent retired. Democratic hold.	▌ ✓ Charles R. Buckalew (Democratic) 95.9%; ▌ J. W. Lattig (Prohibition) 4.1%
Pennsylvania 12	Joseph A. Scranton	Republican	1884	Incumbent lost re-election. Democratic gain.	▌ ✓ John Lynch (Democratic) 48.3%; ▌ Joseph A. Scranton (Republican) 46.1%; ▌ Avery Knapp (Prohibition) 5.7%
Pennsylvania 13	Charles N. Brumm	Republican	1880	Incumbent re-elected.	▌ ✓ Charles N. Brumm (Republican/Greenback) 50.2%; ▌ Watson F. Shepherd (Democratic) 46.8%; ▌ J. R. Cleaver (Prohibition) 3.0%
Pennsylvania 14	Franklin Bound	Republican	1884	Incumbent re-elected.	▌ ✓ Franklin Bound (Republican) 51.9%; ▌ James H. McDevitt (Democratic) 43.9%; ▌ J. J. Nissley (Prohibition) 4.2%
Pennsylvania 15	Frank C. Bunnell	Republican	1884	Incumbent re-elected.	▌ ✓ Frank C. Bunnell (Republican) 56.3%; ▌ Victor E. Piolett (Democratic) 36.5%; ▌ Richard T. Dodson (Prohibition) 7.1%
Pennsylvania 16	William Wallace Brown	Republican	1882	Incumbent retired. Republican hold.	▌ ✓ Henry C. McCormick (Republican) 55.3%; ▌ Edward I. Keenan (Democratic) 40.0%; ▌ David Sterrett (Prohibition) 4.7%
Pennsylvania 17	Jacob M. Campbell	Republican	1880	Incumbent lost renomination. Republican hold.	▌ ✓ Edward Scull (Republican) 49.7%; ▌ Humphrey Tate (Democratic) 47.0%; ▌ John Clark (Prohibition) 3.1%; ▌ John Suckling (Labor) 0.2%
Pennsylvania 18	Louis E. Atkinson	Republican	1882	Incumbent re-elected.	▌ ✓ Louis E. Atkinson (Republican) 54.2%; ▌ George Jacobs (Democratic) 43.9%; ▌ L. S. Clark (Prohibition) 1.9%
Pennsylvania 19	John Augustus Swope	Democratic	1884	Incumbent retired. Democratic hold.	▌ ✓ Levi Maish (Democratic) 54.3%; ▌ Benjamin F. Seitz (Republican) 42.5%; ▌ George Hench (Prohibition) 3.3%
Pennsylvania 20	Andrew Gregg Curtin	Democratic	1880	Incumbent retired. Republican gain.	▌ ✓ John Patton (Republican) 48.8%; ▌ James Knox Polk Hall (Democratic) 48.4%; ▌ H. A. Trumpfheller (Prohibition) 2.3%; ▌ Theodore P. Rynder (Greenback) 0.5%
Pennsylvania 21	Charles Edmund Boyle	Democratic	1882	Incumbent retired. Republican gain.	▌ ✓ Welty McCullogh (Republican) 45.2%; ▌ Henry L. Donnelly (Democratic) 44.4%; ▌ Gilbert L. Rafferty (Independent Democratic) 7.6%; ▌ Thomas Hill (Prohibition) 2.8%
Pennsylvania 22	James S. Negley	Republican	1884	Incumbent retired. Republican hold.	▌ ✓ John Dalzell (Republican) 54.3%; ▌ Robert B. Parkinson (Democratic) 41.2%; ▌ William B. Brickell (Prohibition) 3.5%; ▌ W. L. Bird (Greenback) 1.0%
Pennsylvania 23	Thomas M. Bayne	Republican	1876	Incumbent re-elected.	▌ ✓ Thomas M. Bayne (Republican) 58.9%; ▌ Thomas B. Alcorn (Democratic) 34.4%; ▌ T. H. Rabe (Prohibition) 6.7%
Pennsylvania 24	Oscar L. Jackson	Republican	1884	Incumbent re-elected.	▌ ✓ Oscar L. Jackson (Republican) 55.3%; ▌ Thomas H. Baird (Democratic) 38.7%; ▌ Dallas C. Irish (Prohibition) 5.5%; ▌ Zabina F. Allen (Greenback) 0.5%
Pennsylvania 25	Alexander Colwell White	Republican	1884	Incumbent retired. Republican hold.	▌ ✓ James T. Maffett (Republican) 51.3%; ▌ Thomas St. Clair (Democratic) 45.5%; ▌ R. P. Hunter (Prohibition) 3.2%
Pennsylvania 26	George Washington Fleeger	Republican	1884	Incumbent retired. Democratic gain.	▌ ✓ Norman Hall (Democratic) 46.3%; ▌ Walter B. Roberts (Republican) 44.6%; ▌ A. V. Cunningham (Prohibition) 7.3%; ▌ John Hull (Greenback) 1.8%
Pennsylvania 27	William Lawrence Scott	Democratic	1884	Incumbent re-elected.	▌ ✓ William Lawrence Scott (Democratic) 48.5%; ▌ Charles W. Mackey (Republican) 44.5%; ▌ Hiram F. Andrews (Prohibition) 7.0%
Pennsylvania at-large	Edwin S. Osborne	Republican	1884	Incumbent re-elected.	▌ ✓ Edwin S. Osborne (Republican) 50.8%; ▌ Maxwell Stevenson (Democratic) 45.0%; ▌ John M. Palmer (Prohibition) 3.7%; ▌ C. D. Thompson (Greenback) 0.6%

== Rhode Island ==
District	Incumbent			This race	
District	Member	Party	First elected	Results	Candidates
Rhode Island 1	Henry J. Spooner	Republican	1881	Incumbent re-elected.	▌ ✓ Henry J. Spooner (Republican) 52.9%; ▌ Oscar Lapham (Democratic) 35.7%; ▌ Albert Howard (Prohibition) 11.4%
Rhode Island 2	William A. Pirce	Republican	1884	Incumbent retired. Republican hold.	First ballot (November, 1886): ▌ Charles S. Bradley (Democratic) 48.2%; ▌ Nathan F. Dixon III (Republican) 43.1%; ▌ Arnold B. Chace (Prohibition) 7.6%; Second ballot (January, 1887): ▌ ✓ Warren O. Arnold (Republican) 51.8%; ▌ Charles S. Bradley (Democratic) 46.4%; ▌ Thomas H. Peabody (Prohibition) 1.8%

== South Carolina ==
District	Incumbent			This race	
District	Member	Party	First elected	Results	Candidates
South Carolina 1	Samuel Dibble	Democratic	1882	Incumbent re-elected.	▌ ✓ Samuel Dibble (Democratic) 99.9%; Others 0.1%
South Carolina 2	George D. Tillman	Democratic	1878	Incumbent re-elected.	▌ ✓ George D. Tillman (Democratic) 99.6%; Others 0.4%
South Carolina 3	D. Wyatt Aiken	Democratic	1876	Incumbent retired. Democratic hold.	▌ ✓ James S. Cothran (Democratic) 99.8%; Others 0.2%
South Carolina 4	William H. Perry	Democratic	1884	Incumbent re-elected.	▌ ✓ William H. Perry (Democratic) 100%
South Carolina 5	John J. Hemphill	Democratic	1882	Incumbent re-elected.	▌ ✓ John J. Hemphill (Democratic) 99.9%; Others 0.1%
South Carolina 6	George W. Dargan	Democratic	1882	Incumbent re-elected.	▌ ✓ George W. Dargan (Democratic) 98.7%; Others 1.3%
South Carolina 7	Robert Smalls	Republican	1884 (special)	Incumbent lost re-election. Democratic gain.	▌ ✓ William Elliott (Democratic) 52.0%; ▌Robert Smalls (Republican) 47.8%; Others 0.2%

== Tennessee ==
District	Incumbent			This race	
District	Member	Party	First elected	Results	Candidates
Tennessee 1	Augustus H. Pettibone	Republican	1880	Incumbent retired. Republican hold.	▌ ✓ Roderick R. Butler (Republican) 59.95%; ▌James White (Democratic) 40.05%
Tennessee 2	Leonidas C. Houk	Republican	1878	Incumbent re-elected.	▌ ✓ Leonidas C. Houk (Republican) 67.00%; ▌Samuel G. Heiskell (Democratic) 32.92%; ▌Will A. McTeer (Unknown) 0.08%
Tennessee 3	John R. Neal	Democratic	1884	Incumbent re-elected.	▌ ✓ John R. Neal (Democratic) 50.62%; ▌John T. Wilder (Republican) 49.38%
Tennessee 4	Benton McMillin	Democratic	1878	Incumbent re-elected.	▌ ✓ Benton McMillin (Democratic) 61.49%; ▌J. J. Turner (Ind. Democratic) 38.51%
Tennessee 5	James D. Richardson	Democratic	1884	Incumbent re-elected.	▌ ✓ James D. Richardson (Democratic) 68.92%; ▌S. D. Mathew (Republican) 31.08%
Tennessee 6	Andrew J. Caldwell	Democratic	1882	Incumbent retired. Democratic hold.	▌ ✓ Joseph E. Washington (Democratic) 61.81%; ▌John H. Nye (Republican) 38.19%
Tennessee 7	John G. Ballentine	Democratic	1882	Incumbent retired. Democratic hold.	▌ ✓ Washington C. Whitthorne (Democratic) 58.82%; ▌G. W. Blackburn (Republican) 41.18%
Tennessee 8	John M. Taylor	Democratic	1882	Incumbent retired. Democratic hold.	▌ ✓ Benjamin A. Enloe (Democratic) 53.47%; ▌Samuel W. Hawkins (Republican) 46.53%
Tennessee 9	Presley T. Glass	Democratic	1884	Incumbent re-elected.	▌ ✓ Presley T. Glass (Democratic) 58.96%; ▌David A. Nunn (Republican) 41.04%
Tennessee 10	Zachary Taylor	Republican	1884	Incumbent lost re-election. Democratic gain.	▌ ✓ James Phelan Jr. (Democratic) 60.01%; ▌Zachary Taylor (Republican) 39.99%

== Texas ==
District	Incumbent			This race	
District	Member	Party	First elected	Results	Candidates
Texas 1	Charles Stewart	Democratic	1882	Incumbent re-elected.	▌ ✓ Charles Stewart (Democratic) 61.9%; ▌ H. D. Johnson (Republican) 38.0%
Texas 2	John H. Reagan	Democratic	1874	Incumbent re-elected.	▌ ✓ John H. Reagan (Democratic) 95.7%; ▌ John Collins (Independent) 3.4%
Texas 3	James H. Jones	Democratic	1882	Incumbent retired. Democratic hold.	▌ ✓ Constantine B. Kilgore (Democratic) 69.3%; ▌ William E. Farmer (Independent) 30.6%
Texas 4	David B. Culberson	Democratic	1874	Incumbent re-elected.	▌ ✓ David B. Culberson (Democratic) 78.5%; ▌ James T. Fleming (Independent) 21.4%
Texas 5	James W. Throckmorton	Democratic	1882	Incumbent retired. Democratic hold.	▌ ✓ Silas Hare (Democratic) 41.8%; ▌ George B. Pickett (Independent Democratic) 29.5%; ▌ Henry Clay Mack (Independent Democratic) 28.6%
Texas 6	Olin Wellborn	Democratic	1878	Incumbent lost renomination. Democratic hold.	▌ ✓ Jo Abbott (Democratic) 59.9%; ▌ James C. Kearby (Independent) 36.7%; ▌ Anthony Banning Norton (Republican) 3.3%
Texas 7	William H. Crain	Democratic	1884	Incumbent re-elected.	▌ ✓ William H. Crain (Democratic) 89.1%; ▌ John L. Haynes (Republican) 6.2%; ▌ Norris Wright Cuney (Republican) 4.6%
Texas 8	James Francis Miller	Democratic	1882	Incumbent retired. Democratic hold.	▌ ✓ Littleton W. Moore (Democratic) 92.1%; ▌ William O. Hutchinson (Republican) 7.7%
Texas 9	Roger Q. Mills	Democratic	1872	Incumbent re-elected.	▌ ✓ Roger Q. Mills (Democratic) 60.2%; ▌ J. D. Rankin (Prohibition/Labor) 39.8%
Texas 10	Joseph D. Sayers	Democratic	1884	Incumbent re-elected.	▌ ✓ Joseph D. Sayers (Democratic) 78.1%; ▌ James Pearson Newcomb (Republican) 21.8%
Texas 11	S. W. T. Lanham	Democratic	1882	Incumbent re-elected.	▌ ✓ S. W. T. Lanham (Democratic) 74.0%; ▌ [FNU] Barnet (Independent) 26.1%

== Utah Territory ==
See Non-voting delegates, below.

== Vermont ==
District	Incumbent			This race	
District	Member	Party	First elected	Results	Candidates
Vermont 1	John W. Stewart	Republican	1882	Incumbent re-elected.	▌ ✓ John W. Stewart (Republican) 72.6%; ▌Waldo Brigham (Democratic) 26.3%; ▌T. H. Brown (Greenback) 0.7%
Vermont 2	William W. Grout	Republican	1880; 1882 (lost); 1884	Incumbent re-elected.	▌ ✓ William W. Grout (Republican) 69.4%; ▌Harley E. Folsom (Democratic) 30.3%; ▌Charles B. Cummings (Greenback) 0.2%

== Virginia ==
District	Incumbent			This race	
District	Member	Party	First elected	Results	Candidates
Virginia 1	Thomas Croxton	Democratic	1884	Incumbent lost re-election. Republican gain.	▌ ✓ Thomas H. B. Browne (Republican) 54.1%; ▌Thomas Croxton (Democratic) 45.9%
Virginia 2	Harry Libbey	Republican	1882	Incumbent retired. Republican hold.	▌ ✓ George E. Bowden (Republican) 60.7%; ▌Marshall Parks (Democratic) 39.3%
Virginia 3	George D. Wise	Democratic	1880	Incumbent re-elected.	▌ ✓ George D. Wise (Democratic) 52.7%; ▌Edmund Waddill Jr. (Republican) 47.3%
Virginia 4	James Dennis Brady	Republican	1884	Incumbent retired. Republican hold.	▌ ✓ William E. Gaines (Republican) 70.2%; ▌Mann Page (Democratic) 29.8%
Virginia 5	George Cabell	Democratic	1874	Incumbent lost re-election. Republican gain.	▌ ✓ John Robert Brown (Republican) 57.1%; ▌George Cabell (Democratic) 42.9%
Virginia 6	John W. Daniel	Democratic	1884	Incumbent retired. Labor gain.	▌ ✓ Samuel I. Hopkins (Labor) 51.6%; ▌Samuel Griffin (Democratic) 48.4%
Virginia 7	Charles T. O'Ferrall	Democratic	1882 (contest)	Incumbent re-elected.	▌ ✓ Charles T. O'Ferrall (Democratic) 51.7%; ▌John E. Roller (Republican) 48.3%
Virginia 8	John S. Barbour Jr.	Democratic	1880	Incumbent retired. Democratic hold.	▌ ✓ W. H. F. Lee (Democratic) 57.5%; ▌W. C. Elam (Republican) 42.5%
Virginia 9	Connally Findlay Trigg	Democratic	1884	Incumbent retired. Republican gain.	▌ ✓ Henry Bowen (Republican) 57.6%; ▌R. R. Henry (Democratic) 42.4%
Virginia 10	J. Randolph Tucker	Democratic	1874	Incumbent retired. Republican gain.	▌ ✓ Jacob Yost (Republican) 53.4%; ▌James Bumgardner (Democratic) 46.6%

== Washington Territory ==
See Non-voting delegates, below.

== West Virginia ==
District	Incumbent			This race	
District	Member	Party	First elected	Results	Candidates
West Virginia 1	Nathan Goff Jr.	Republican	1882	Incumbent re-elected.	▌ ✓ Nathan Goff Jr. (Republican) 51.55%; ▌John Brannon (Democratic) 47.87%; ▌L. E. Peters (Prohibition) 0.59%
West Virginia 2	William L. Wilson	Democratic	1882	Incumbent re-elected.	▌ ✓ William L. Wilson (Democratic) 49.87%; ▌W. H. Flick (Republican) 49.61%; ▌John T. Siler (Prohibition) 0.53%
West Virginia 3	Charles P. Snyder	Democratic	1883 (special)	Incumbent re-elected.	▌ ✓ Charles P. Snyder (Democratic) 50.57%; ▌James H. Brown (Republican) 47.54%; ▌J. W. Claypool (Prohibition) 1.89%
West Virginia 4	Eustace Gibson	Democratic	1882	Incumbent lost renomination. Democratic hold.	▌ ✓ Charles E. Hogg (Democratic) 50.29%; ▌John H. Hutchinson (Republican) 48.00%; ▌William H. Smith (Prohibition) 1.71%

== Wisconsin ==
Wisconsin elected nine members of congress on Election Day, November 2, 1886.

District	Incumbent			This race	
District	Member	Party	First elected	Results	Candidates
Wisconsin 1	Lucien B. Caswell	Republican	1884	Incumbent re-elected.	▌ ✓ Lucien B. Caswell (Republican) 46.9%; ▌James R. Doolittle (Democratic) 44.9%; ▌Edward G. Durant (Prohibition) 8.2%
Wisconsin 2	Edward S. Bragg	Democratic	1884	Incumbent lost re-nomination. Republican gain.	▌ ✓ Richard W. Guenther (Republican) 55.7%; ▌Arthur K. Delaney (Democratic) 40.4%; ▌J. L. Ingersoll (Prohibition) 3.9%
Wisconsin 3	Robert M. La Follette	Republican	1884	Incumbent re-elected.	▌ ✓ Robert M. La Follette (Republican) 50.3%; ▌Hugh J. Gallagher (Democratic) 39.7%; ▌Thomas C. Richmond (Prohibition) 9.8%
Wisconsin 4	Isaac W. Van Schaick	Republican	1884	Incumbent declined re-nomination. Union Labor gain.	▌ ✓ Henry Smith (Union Labor) 42.5%; ▌Thomas H. Brown (Republican) 30.7%; ▌John Black (Democratic) 26.2%; ▌Z. N. Trask (Prohibition) 0.6%
Wisconsin 5	Thomas R. Hudd	Democratic	1886 (special)	Incumbent re-elected.	▌ ✓ Thomas R. Hudd (Democratic) 60.6%; ▌Gustav Küstermann (Republican) 39.2%
Wisconsin 6	Richard W. Guenther	Republican	1880	Incumbent lost re-nomination. Republican hold.	▌ ✓ Charles B. Clark (Republican) 54.6%; ▌Andrew Haben (Democratic) 39.4%; ▌E. D. Kanouse (Prohibition) 6.0%
Wisconsin 7	Ormsby B. Thomas	Republican	1884	Incumbent re-elected.	▌ ✓ Ormsby B. Thomas (Republican) 54.2%; ▌S. N. Dickenson (Democratic) 38.7%; ▌S. B. Loomis (Prohibition) 7.1%
Wisconsin 8	William T. Price	Republican	1882	Incumbent re-elected.	▌ ✓ William T. Price (Republican) 66.7%; ▌James Bracklin (Democratic) 33.2%
Wisconsin 9	Isaac Stephenson	Republican	1882	Incumbent re-elected.	▌ ✓ Isaac Stephenson (Republican) 55.8%; ▌John Ringle (Democratic) 44.0%; ▌Joe Koezer (Prohibition) 0.1%

== Wyoming Territory ==
See Non-voting delegates, below.

== Non-voting members ==
District	Incumbent			This race	
District	Delegate	Party	First elected	Results	Candidates
Arizona Territory at-large
Dakota Territory at-large
Idaho Territory at-large	John Hailey	Democratic	1884	Incumbent lost re-election. Republican gain.	▌ ✓ Fred Dubois (Republican) 51.41%; ▌John Hailey (Democratic) 48.57%
Montana Territory at-large	Joseph Toole	Democratic	1884	Incumbent re-elected.	▌ ✓ Joseph Toole (Democratic) 55.76%; ▌Wilbur F. Sanders (Republican) 44.24%
New Mexico Territory at-large
Utah Territory at-large
Washington Territory at-large
Wyoming Territory at-large	Joseph M. Carey	Republican	1884	Incumbent re-elected.	▌ ✓ Joseph M. Carey (Republican) 88.12%; ▌H. G. Balch (Democratic) 5.59%; ▌T. G. Magee (Democratic) 3.63%; Others: ▌J. M. Lobban (Democratic) 0.74%; ▌L. Kabis (Democratic) 0.49%; Others 1.43%

== See also ==
- 1886 United States elections
  - 1886–87 United States Senate elections
- 49th United States Congress
- 50th United States Congress

== Bibliography ==
- Dubin, Michael J. (March 1, 1998). United States Congressional Elections, 1788-1997: The Official Results of the Elections of the 1st Through 105th Congresses. McFarland and Company. ISBN 978-0786402830.
- Martis, Kenneth C. (January 1, 1989). The Historical Atlas of Political Parties in the United States Congress, 1789-1989. Macmillan Publishing Company. ISBN 978-0029201701.
- Moore, John L., ed. (1994). Congressional Quarterly's Guide to U.S. Elections (Third ed.). Congressional Quarterly Inc. ISBN 978-0871879967.
- "Party Divisions of the House of Representatives* 1789–Present". Office of the Historian, House of United States House of Representatives.
