= Hamilton Brothers Building =

- U.S. National Register of Historic Places
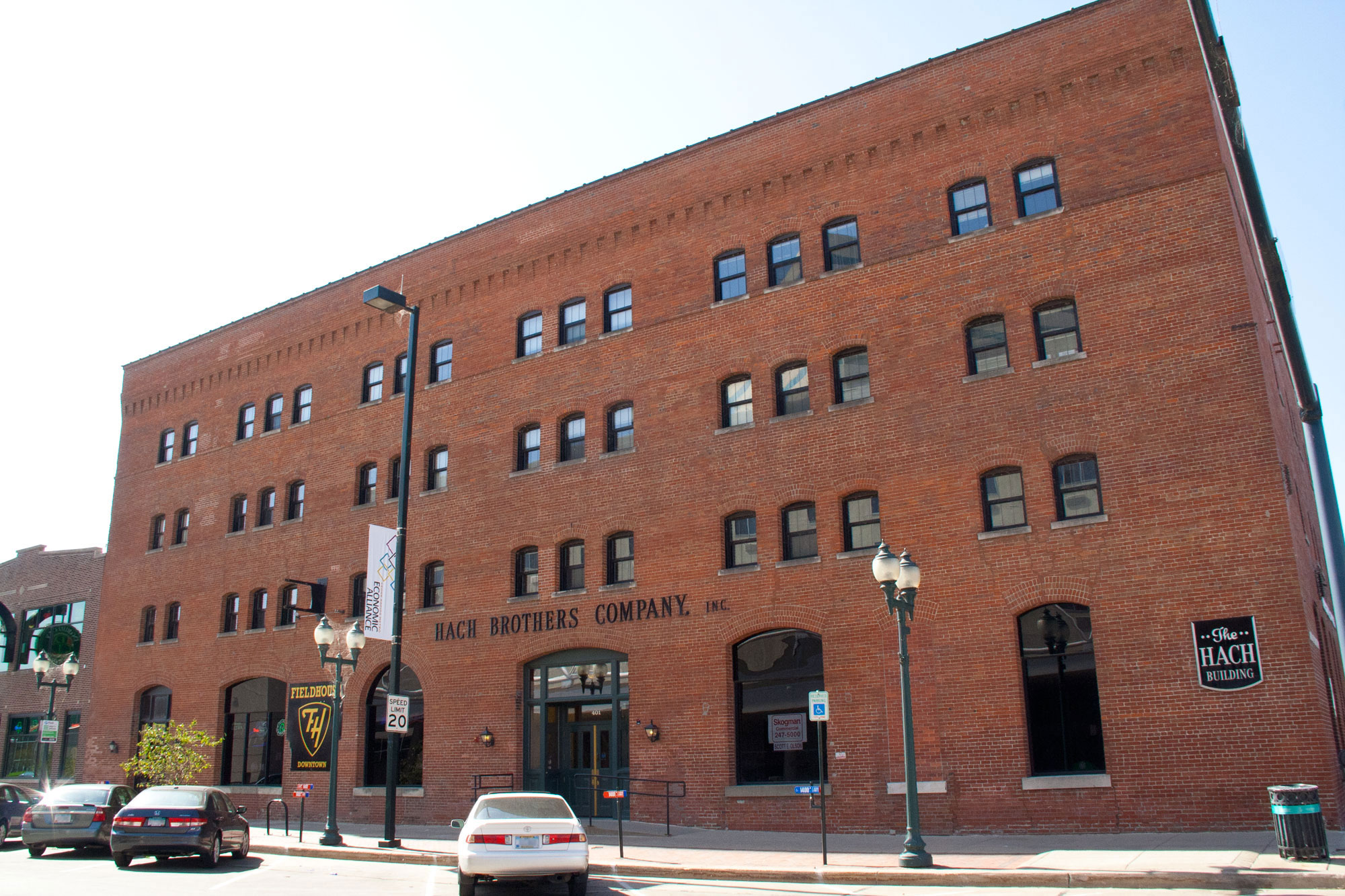

- Location within Iowa Location within the United States
- Location: 401 1st St., SE; Cedar Rapids, Iowa
- Coordinates: 41°58′30.3″N 91°40′02.3″W
- Area: less than one acre
- Built: 1899
- Architectural style: Romanesque
- NRHP reference No.: 94001098
- Added to NRHP: September 8, 1994

The Hamilton Brothers Building, also known as Warfield-Pratt & Howell Co. Wholesale Grocers, and the Hach Brothers Company, is a historic building located in Cedar Rapids, Iowa, United States. This is the only extant building associated with local businessman and politician John Taylor Hamilton. He was a representative of Cyrus McCormick at the time his company was opening new markets for his mechanical reaper and other implements. Hamilton expanded his business to other implement manufactures and included product lines for urban dwellers as well. His business grew beyond the local area to include the entire state. Built as a warehouse in 1899, it is the only building of this type left near the central business district. It is also the largest building of this type in the city. The four-story, brick, Romanesque Revival structure features large round arch openings on the main floor and smaller windows on the upper floors. It was listed on the National Register of Historic Places in 1994.
