= 1914 Iowa gubernatorial election =

- November 3, 1914
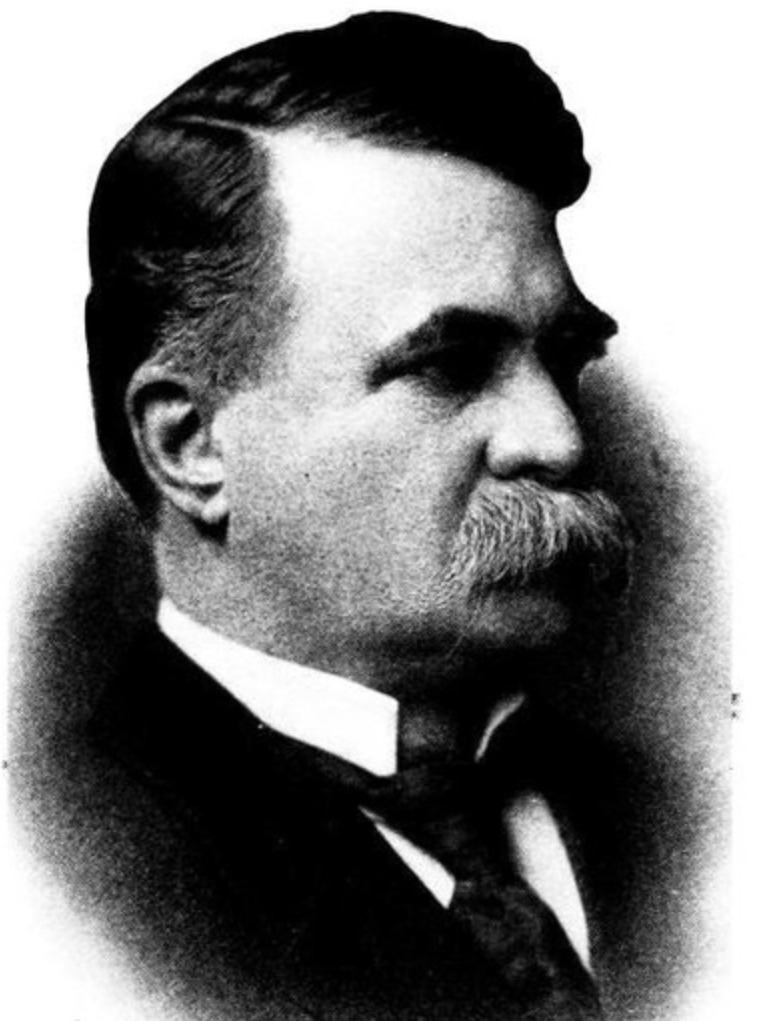

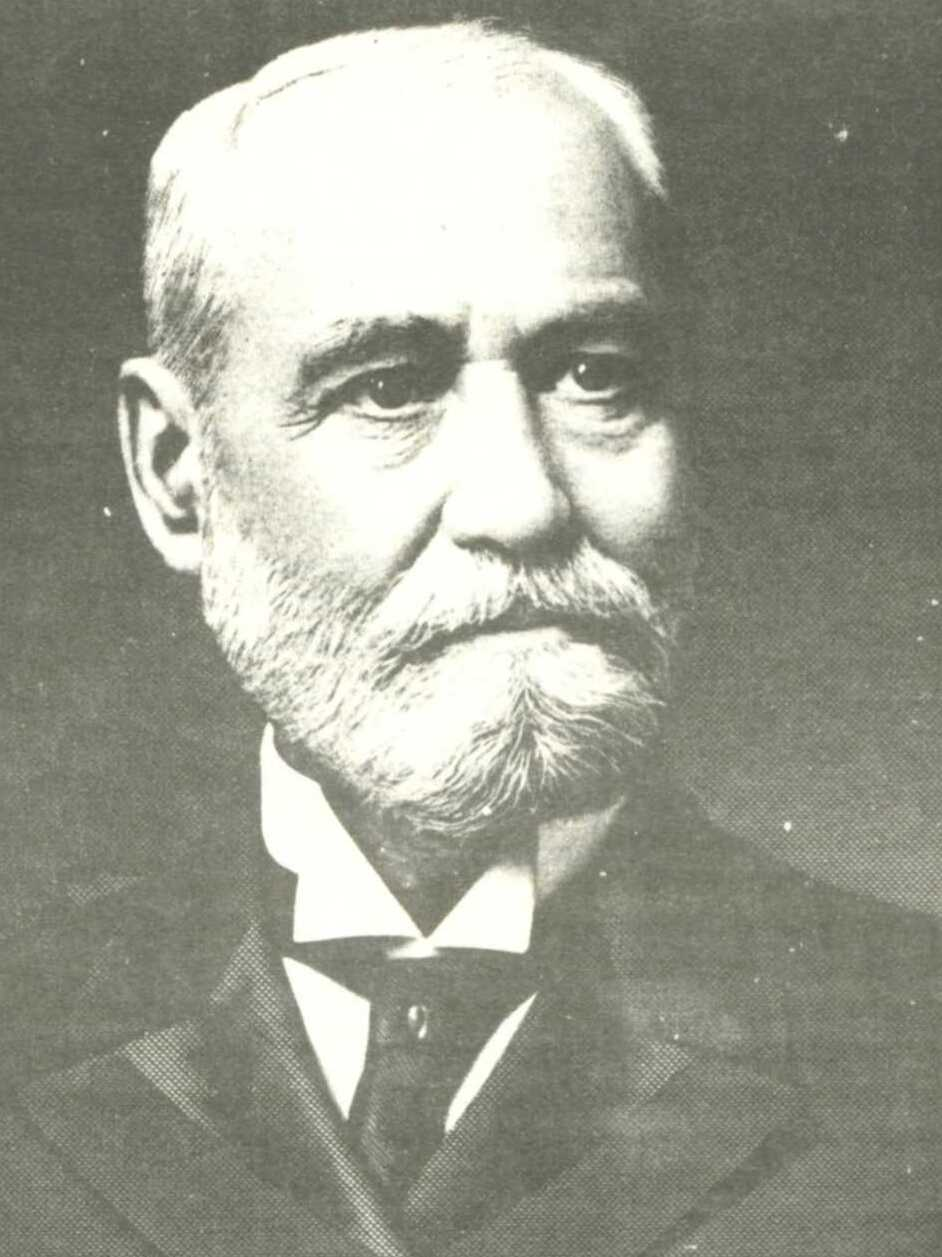
Nominee	George W. Clarke	John Taylor Hamilton
Party	Republican	Democratic
Popular vote	207,881	181,036
Percentage	49.31%	42.94%
- County results Clarke: 30–40% 40–50% 50–60% 60–70% 70–80% Hamilton: 40–50% 50–60% 60–70%
Governor before election
George W. Clarke
Republican
Elected Governor
George W. Clarke
Republican

The 1914 Iowa gubernatorial election was held on November 3, 1914. Incumbent Republican George W. Clarke defeated Democratic nominee John Taylor Hamilton with 49.31% of the vote.

== General election ==
=== Candidates ===
Major party candidates

- George W. Clarke, Republican
- John Taylor Hamilton, Democratic

Other candidates

- George C. White, Progressive
- Oliver C. Wilson, Socialist
- Malcolm Smith, Prohibition

=== Results ===
1914 Iowa gubernatorial election
Party	Candidate	Votes	%	±%
Republican	George W. Clarke (incumbent)	207,881	49.31%	
Democratic	John Taylor Hamilton	181,036	42.94%	
Progressive	George C. White	16,796	3.98%	
Socialist	Oliver C. Wilson	9,029	2.14%	
Prohibition	Malcolm Smith	6,837	1.62%	
Majority		26,845		
Turnout				
Republican hold		Swing		
