= George C. White =

American politician

George Clinton White (December 6, 1865 – May 8, 1927) was an American lawyer and politician.

== Biography ==
George White's great-grandfather, Nathaniel White, fought in the American Revolutionary War. George C. White was born in Blue Mound Township, McLean County, Illinois, on December 6, 1865, to parents William H. White and Martha Ann Donnavan. His father was a native of Tippecanoe County, Indiana, who moved to Illinois in 1850. George White attended local schools in Illinois, became a teacher, then enrolled at the Illinois State Normal University for two years until 1888, returning to teaching for the next three years.

On June 18, 1890, White married Ida May Chalfant. The couple moved to Nevada, Iowa, in 1893, to farm. He subsequently read law, graduated from Drake University Law School with a bachelor of laws degree in 1909, and earned a master of laws degree from Yale Law School in 1910. He practiced law with Clifford Thorne for one year, then began his own practice based in Nevada.

White was also politically active while a Nevada resident, serving as township clerk, township trustee and school board president. He was elected to the Iowa House of Representatives in 1906 and 1908, holding the District 52 seat as a Republican between January 14, 1907, and January 8, 1911. He contested the 1914 Iowa gubernatorial election as the Bull Moose candidate.

In November 1924, White moved to Mason City to join the Dunn & Dunn law firm. He died at his Mason City home on May 7, 1927. Memorial services were held in Mason City and Nevada, before White was buried in Nevada.
