= Robert G. Cousins =

American politician

Robert Cousins
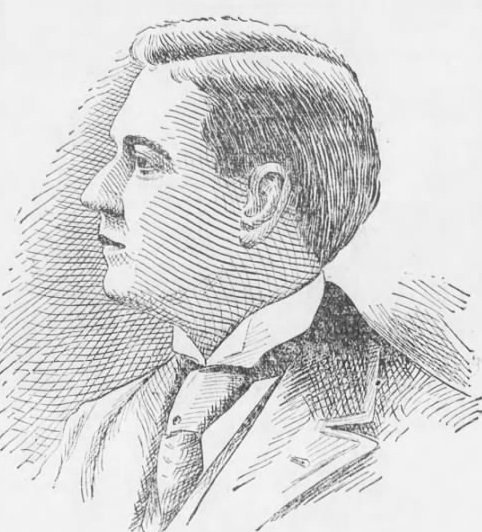
- Cousins in 1896

Member of the U.S. House of Representatives from Iowa's 5th district
- In office March 4, 1893 – March 3, 1909
- Preceded by: John T. Hamilton
- Succeeded by: James W. Good

Personal details
- Born: January 31, 1859 Tipton, Iowa, U.S.
- Died: June 30, 1933 (aged 74) Iowa City, Iowa, U.S
- Party: Republican
- Education: Cornell College

Robert Gordon Cousins (January 31, 1859 – June 20, 1933) was an eight-term Republican U.S. Representative from Iowa's 5th congressional district. He represented the Cedar Rapids, Iowa, area for the last eight years of the 19th century and the first eight years of the 20th century.

Born on a farm, "Indian Lodge," near Tipton, Iowa, in Cedar County, Iowa, Cousins attended the common schools, and was graduated from Cornell College in Mount Vernon, Iowa, in 1881. After studying law, he was admitted to the bar in 1882, and engaged in practice in Tipton.

In 1886, Cousins was elected to the Iowa House of Representatives. He was chosen by the House as one of the managers to conduct the impeachment proceedings of John L. Brown before the Iowa Senate in 1886. He served as prosecuting attorney for Cedar County from 1888 to 1890.

In 1892, Cousins ran as a Republican against Democratic Congressman John Taylor Hamilton, who had won election to the U.S. House seat for Iowa's 5th congressional district two years earlier. Cousins defeated Hamilton in the general election and thereby became a member of the Fifty-third Congress. He was then re-elected to the seven succeeding Congresses. He served as chairman of the Committee on Expenditures in the Department of the Treasury from the Fifty-fifth through Fifty-ninth Congresses, and chairman of the House Committee on Foreign Affairs in the Sixtieth Congress.

In 1908, Cousins declined to be a candidate for renomination. In all, he served in Congress from March 4, 1893 to March 3, 1909.

After leaving Congress, Cousins resumed the practice of law in Tipton, and also engaged as a writer and as a Chautauqua lecturer.

He died on June 20, 1933, in Iowa City, Iowa. He was interred in Red Oak Cemetery, five miles northwest of Tipton.

U.S. House of Representatives
Preceded by John T. Hamilton	Member of the U.S. House of Representatives from Iowa's 5th congressional district March 4, 1893–March 3, 1909	Succeeded by James W. Good
