= 117th Illinois Infantry Regiment =

117th Regiment Illinois Volunteer Infantry
- Active: September 19, 1862 - August 5, 1865
- Country: United States
- Allegiance: Union
- Branch: Infantry
- Engagements: Meridian Campaign; Red River Campaign; Battle of Pleasant Hill; Battle of Nashville; Battle of Fort Blakeley

The 117th Illinois Volunteer Infantry was an infantry regiment in the Union Army during the American Civil War.

== Service ==
The 117th Illinois Infantry was organized at Camp Butler in Springfield, Illinois and mustered in for three years service on September 19, 1862, under the command of Colonel Risdon M. Moore.

The regiment was attached to Reserve Brigade, District of Memphis, Tennessee, XIII Corps, Department of the Tennessee, to January 1863. District of Memphis, XVI Corps, to March 1863. 1st Brigade, 5th Division, District of Memphis, XVI Corps, to January 1864. 3rd Brigade, 3rd Division, XVI Corps, to December 1864. 3rd Brigade, 2nd Division, Detachment Army of the Tennessee, Department of the Cumberland, to February 1865. 2nd Brigade, 2nd Division, XVI Corps, Military Division West Mississippi, to August 1865.

The 117th Illinois Infantry mustered out of service August 5, 1865.

== Detailed service ==
Moved to Memphis, Tennessee, November 11–17, 1862. Duty at Memphis, until July 5, 1863. Affairs near Memphis June 17–18, 1863 (detachment). Moved to Helena, Arkansas, July 5, and returned to Memphis. Duty there until December 29, 1863. Expedition after Forrest December 24–31. 1863 (detachment). Grierson's Bridge and near Moscow and Lafayette December 27. Ordered to Vicksburg, Mississippi. Meridian Campaign February 3-March 2, 1864. Clinton February 5. Meridian February 9–13. Red River Campaign March 10-May 22. Fort DeRussy March 14. Occupation of Alexandria March 16. Battle of Pleasant Hill April 9. About Cloutiersville April 22–24. At Alexandria April 26-May 13. Governor Moore's Plantation and Bayou Roberts May 3–7 and 11. Retreat to Morganza May 13–20. Mensurn May 16. Yellow Bayou May 18. Moved to Vicksburg, Mississippi; then to Memphis, Tennessee, May 21-June 10. Action at Lake Chicot, Arkansas, June 6. March to relief of Gen. Sturgis June 14–16. Near Lafayette June 23. Smith's Expedition to Tupelo, Mississippi, July 5–21. Camargo's Cross Roads, near Harrisburg, July 13. Harrisburg, near Tupelo, July 14–15. Old Town (or Tishamingo) Creek July 15. Smith's Expedition to Oxford, Mississippi, August 1–30. Hurricane Creek August 13–14. Abbeville August 23. Moved to Jefferson Barracks, Missouri, and in pursuit of Price through Missouri September to November. Action at Franklin, Missouri, October 1. Moved from St. Louis to Nashville, Tennessee, November 21-December 1. Battle of Nashville December 15–16. Pursuit of Hood to the Tennessee River December 17–28. Moved to Clifton, Tennessee, and Eastport, Mississippi, and duty there until February 1865. Moved to New Orleans, Louisiana, February 6–17. Campaign against Mobile and its defenses March 17-April 12. Siege of Spanish Fort and Fort Blakely March 26-April 8. Assault and capture of Fort Blakely April 9. Occupation of Mobile April 12. March to Montgomery April 13–25, and duty there until August.

== Casualties ==
The regiment lost a total of 130 men during service—11 enlisted men killed or mortally wounded, 4 officers and 115 enlisted men died of disease.

== Commanders ==
- Colonel Risdon M. Moore
- Lieutenant Colonel Jonathan Merriam - commanded at the Battle of Nashville

== Notable members ==
- 1st Lieutenant Daniel Kerr, Company G - U.S. Representative from Iowa, 1887–1891

== See also ==
- List of Illinois Civil War units
- Illinois in the Civil War
