= Reuben B. CarlLee =

American politician

Reuben Bates CarlLee (1841 - 1915) was a labor leader and state legislator in Arkansas. He served two terms in the Arkansas Legislature.

He was born in Jackson County, Virginia. He served in the Confederate Army during the American Civil War. He was elected to the Arkansas state legislature in 1882 and 1884.

He was part of the Agricultural Wheel. He alleged election fraud in Arkansas. He married, became widowed, remarried and had five children. He was a Methodist.
