= John Taylor Hamilton =

American politician (1843–1925)

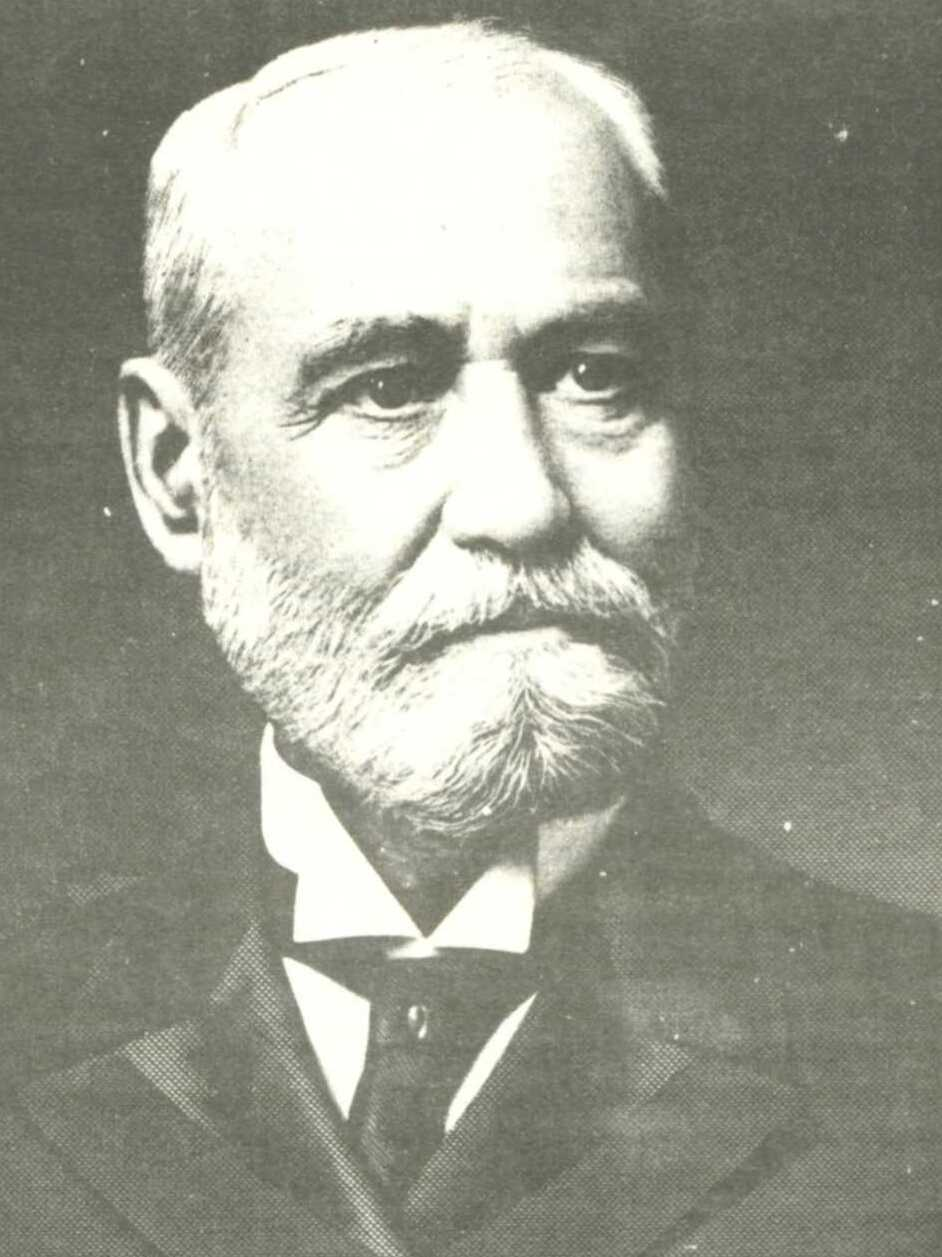

Member of the U.S. House of Representatives from Iowa's 5th district
- In office March 4, 1891 – March 3, 1893
- Preceded by: Daniel Kerr
- Succeeded by: Robert G. Cousins

Member of the Iowa House of Representatives
- In office 1885-1891

Personal details
- Born: October 16, 1843 Geneseo, Henry County, Illinois, U.S.
- Died: January 25, 1925 (aged 81) Cedar Rapids, Iowa, U.S.
- Resting place: Oak Hill Cemetery; Cedar Rapids, Iowa, U.S.
- Party: Democratic
- Spouse: Sarah Ann Jones

John Taylor Hamilton (October 16, 1843 – January 25, 1925) was an American businessman from Cedar Rapids, Iowa, and a one-term Democratic member of the United States House of Representatives from Iowa's 5th congressional district.

== Early life ==
Hamilton was born on October 16, 1843, near Geneseo, Henry County, Illinois, to James S. Hamilton and Mary E. Taylor. His ancestors came from Ireland, and were Scottish-Irish. James was born in Westmoreland County, Pennsylvania, and later moved to Antrim, New Hampshire. John's parents were married in Henry County, Illinois, and farmed there. When James retired he moved to Geneseo, Illinois, and lived there until he died at age 77. John's mother died at age 82. The Hamiltons were Presbyterian and the Taylors were Unitarian.

Hamilton got his education from public schools and the Geneseo Seminary. When he was finished with his schooling he worked for a company that sold fire insurance to farmers. After three years the company failed. In 1868, he moved to Cedar Rapids. He arrived in the city on February 2 that year and represented C. H. McCormick of Chicago in the reaper business. He was anxious to start his own business, and started the agricultural implement company Averill & Hamilton on October 1, 1868. He married Sarah Ann Jones, daughter of Edward Jones and Phoebe McArthur, on October 16, 1873. They had four children, two of them being James E. and Mabel Fawn.

== Career ==
In the fall of 1873, Averill sold his stock in the company to John R. Amidon, and the company was renamed Hamilton & Amidon. Hamilton was elected mayor of Cedar Rapids in 1878. He served as a member of the Linn County Board of Supervisors from 1882 to 1884. In May 1883 he became the president of the recently formed Cedar Rapids Savings Bank. In 1885, he was elected a member of the Iowa House of Representatives and served in the 21st through 23rd assemblies. He was speaker of the house in the 23rd assembly, until his term ended in 1891.

In 1890, Hamilton won the Democratic nomination for the U.S. House seat for Iowa's 5th congressional district, a seat that was being vacated by two-term Republican incumbent Daniel Kerr. Riding a wave of hostility in rural states to Republican economic policies such as the McKinley tariff, Democrats took control of the U.S. House, and for the first time since the Civil War won a majority of the U.S. House races in Iowa, including Hamilton's race against Republican nominee George R. Struble. Hamilton served in the 52nd United States Congress. Like the other four freshman Democratic Congressmen elected from Iowa in 1890, Hamilton was not re-elected. He was defeated by Republican Robert G. Cousins in the general election. Hamilton's term ran from March 4, 1891, to March 3, 1893.

He returned to Cedar Rapids to run a business that had changed in his absence. In Hamilton's first year in Congress, his brothers W. W. and Porter had bought Amidon's stock in his and Hamilton's agricultural implement company. The company was then renamed Hamilton Brothers. On July 1, 1899, he became the president of the Merchants National Bank. He was also a stockholder and one of the owners of the Cedar Rapids Hotel Company, owner of the Montrose Hotel, and a stockholder in the Acme Fire Insurance Company.

On April 6, 1906, he was appointed as one of three members of Iowa's Board of Control of State Institutions, to finish the term of former Iowa Supreme Court Justice L. G. Kinne, who had died in office. He was first appointed to that position for two years, In 1908 he was reappointed for a full six-year term, but he resigned a year later, in September 1909, citing the pressing needs of his business.

In 1914, Hamilton ran for Governor of Iowa against incumbent Republican George W. Clark. He won the Democratic primary, but lost to Clark in the general election. He died in Cedar Rapids on January 25, 1925. He was buried in Oak Hill Cemetery.

== Notes ==
Party political offices
Preceded by Edward G. Dunn	Democratic nominee for Governor of Iowa; 1914	Succeeded by Edwin T. Meredith
U.S. House of Representatives
Preceded by Daniel Kerr	Member of the U.S. House of Representatives from Iowa's 5th congressional district March 4, 1891 – March 3, 1893	Succeeded by Robert G. Cousins
