= Israel Abbott =

American politician

Israel B. Abbott

Member of the North Carolina House of Representatives from Craven County
- In office 1872–1874

Personal details
- Born: May 11, 1843
- Died: May 6, 1887 (aged 43) New Bern, North Carolina
- Party: Republican

Israel Braddock Abbott (May 11, 1843 – May 6, 1887) was a politician from North Carolina who served in the North Carolina House of Representatives in 1872 during the Reconstruction era. He was African American.

== Early life ==
Israel Braddock Abbott was born free as Israel Braddock on May 11, 1843. His mother was Grace Braddock, a free woman of color. The identity of his father is unknown, though one account states that he died when Israel was an infant. He was consequently raised by his mother and maternal grandmother. His mother later married a carpenter, Joseph Green. His grandmother oversaw his early education. Though he lacked a formal education, he did become literate. When he was 10 years of age he began apprenticing as a carpenter, studying the craft for two years before finishing his learning under the guidance of his stepfather. By 1860, Israel had taken on the surname "Abbott" and was working as a carpenter.

Following the outbreak of the American Civil War in 1861, Abbott was conscripted to assist in the construction of Confederate forts. He then briefly worked as a servant for a Confederate officer, Lieutenant Alex Miller of the 2nd North Carolina Regiment, before using a forged pass to flee to New Bern, reaching the city on December 18, 1861. He hid in New Bern until it was captured by federal forces in March 1862. He thereafter involved himself in the public affairs and meetings of people of color. By 1870 he was recorded as a carpenter in New Bern and was married with five children.

== Political career ==
After the war, Abbott involved himself in various civic organizations, joining the Good Samaritan Lodge and serving as president of New Bern's Frederick Douglass and Abraham Lincoln chapters of the National Equal Rights League. During the Reconstruction Era, Abbott became involved in the North Carolina Republican Party. He served on the party state executive committee in 1867 and was appointed assistant doorkeeper of the North Carolina House of Representatives in 1868. In 1869, several Republican legislators unsuccessfully petitioned for him to be hired as a state detective. He served as a second lieutenant in the all-black Company H of the 1st North Carolina State Troops, a militia unit raised to maintain order during the Kirk–Holden war of 1870.

Abbott ran for a seat in the State House of Representatives in 1870 and lost. The following year, he was made a deputy sheriff of Craven County and a crier for the North Carolina Superior Court. He served in the North Carolina House of Representatives from 1872 to 1874, representing Craven County. He also became a leading figure in the Young Men's Intelligent and Enterprising Association, a local organization which promoted educational opportunities for blacks. In October 1877, he was one of three delegates from New Bern to attend a convention in Raleigh devoted to advancing educational and economic opportunities for blacks.

Abbott became a close personal friend and confidant of politician George Henry White after the latter moved to New Bern in 1877. In 1880, they founded and co-edited a local newspaper, the Good Samaritan. Abbott served as a delegate to the Republican National Convention in 1880 and was an alternate delegate in 1884. In 1881, Abbott chaired the Grand Lodge of Good Samaritans in North Carolina. That year he also led an unsuccessful labor strike by black residents of James City, many of whom worked in New Bern as laborers and servants.

In 1882, Abbott opposed the Republican nomination of James E. O'Hara for the U.S. House of Representatives seat representing North Carolina's 2nd congressional district. Abbott despised O'Hara, viewing him as a carpetbagger and a venal opportunist, and in the general election favored black independent James H. Harris. He chaired North Carolina's Republican Second District Convention in 1884.

In 1886, Abbott challenged fellow Republican O'Hara for his seat in the U.S. House of Representatives having become a leading figure in the growing Republican opposition against his re-nomination in North Carolina's 2nd congressional district. At the Republican district nominating convention on August 25, the executive committee chair—an O'Hara supporter—attempted to dismiss the delegates as the meeting opened to ensure the nomination went to O'Hara. The opposition faction ignored his order and nominated Abbott as the Republican candidate before quickly adjourning. O'Hara's supporters gathered immediately after and redeclared their support for him as the nominee. Abbott did not think he would win the election but sought to spoil O'Hara's chances. Intense rumors followed that either or both men's campaigns were funded by, L. W. Humphrey, a former Republican with familial connections to the Democratic nominee, Furnifold McLendel Simmons. Abbott also drew racial comparisons between himself and the mixed-race O'Hara, trumpeting his own status as a "pure-blooded Negro" and arguing this made him more fit to represent the interests of blacks.

Abbott and O'Hara split the Republican vote and lost to Simmons in the general election. Simmons led the contest with 15,158 votes while O'Hara placed second with 13,060 votes and Abbott finished last with 5,020. Most of Abbott's electoral support came from the two counties he won, Edgecombe and Warren. Simmons eventually became a leader in the movement to disenfranchise African-American North Carolinians. Despite the overall outcome, Abbott's strong performance left him the likely Republican frontrunner for the next congressional election. The Abbott–O'Hara split led to the creation of two Republican second congressional district executive committees which did not reconcile until January 1888.

== Later life ==
Abbott died in his home in New Bern on May 6, 1887. A funeral was held for him two days later.

== See also ==
- African American officeholders from the end of the Civil War until before 1900

== Works cited ==
- Anderson, Eric (1980). Race and Politics in North Carolina, 1872–1901: The Black Second. Baton Rouge: Louisiana State University Press. ISBN 9780807107843 – via Google Books.
- Boyd, Raphael O'Hara (2001). "Service in the Midst of the Storm: James Edward O'Hara and Reconstruction in North Carolina". The Journal of Negro History. 86 (3): 319–335. JSTOR 1562450.
- Justesen, Benjamin R. (2012). George Henry White: An Even Chance in the Race of Life (reprint ed.). Baton Rouge: Louisiana State University Press. ISBN 9780807144770.
- Massengill, Stephen E. (1985). "The Detectives of William W. Holden, 1869–1870". North Carolina Historical Review. 62 (4): 448–487. ISSN 0029-2494. JSTOR 23518497.
- McGuire, Samuel B. (July 2014). "The Making of a Black Militia Company: New Bern Troops in the Kirk-Holden War, 1870". The North Carolina Historical Review. 91 (3): 288–322. JSTOR 44113199.
- Watson, Alan D. (1987). A History of New Bern and Craven County. New Bern: Tryon Palace Commission. OCLC 17398679.
