= Benjamin T. Frederick =

American politician (1834–1903)

Benjamin Frederick
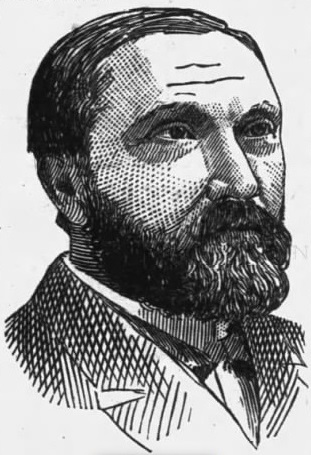

Member of the U.S. House of Representatives from Iowa's 5th district
- In office March 4, 1885 – March 3, 1887
- Preceded by: James Wilson
- Succeeded by: Daniel Kerr

Personal details
- Born: Benjamin Todd Frederick; October 5, 1834 Fredericktown, Ohio, U.S.
- Died: November 3, 1903 (aged 69) San Diego, California, U.S.
- Party: Democratic

Benjamin Todd Frederick (October 5, 1834 – November 3, 1903) was an American miner, businessman, real estate agent and politician. After winning the Democratic nomination for the 1884 elections in Iowa's 5th congressional district, he was elected for one term (1885–1887) to the United States House of Representatives.

== Early life ==
Born in Fredericktown, Ohio, he attended local schools before moving to Marshalltown, Iowa.

== Career ==
He moved to Marysville, California, in 1857 and engaged in placer mining. He returned to Marshalltown in 1859 and engaged in the foundry and machine business from 1865 to 1888. Frederick was a member of the Marshalltown City Council from 1874 to 1877, was a member of the school board for three terms.

In 1882 he was the Democratic nominee for the U.S. House seat representing Iowa's 5th congressional district in the 48th Congress. In the immediate aftermath of a very close general election race, his Republican opponent, James Wilson, was certified by the State of Iowa as the winner, leading Frederick to file an election contest in the U.S. House. Although the House was controlled by Fredrick's own party, the contest was not resolved until the last hours of the second session. On the morning of inauguration day (March 4, 1885), Frederick was declared the winner of the 1882 race, and was seated minutes before the 48th Congress ended. Until then, Republicans had successfully filibustered to prevent a vote by the House on the contest, until continuation of the filibuster would have prevented the House from acting in a popular bill to permit former President Ulysses S. Grant, then on the verge of death, to retire with the benefits of a general. By drawing out debate on every contested election case as long as possible, they could prevent the bill from coming to a vote. Since the rules could not be suspended to bring up the Grant bill until his own case had been determined, he announced, he resigned his claim to Frederick immediately. The Grant bill was then passed.

Frederick had been re-elected in 1884 by defeating Milo P. Smith, so he was able to remain in Congress for two years after his contest victory. In 1886, he did seek and accept the Democratic nomination for re-election, but was defeated in the general election by Republican Daniel Kerr.

In 1887, Frederick moved to San Diego, California, where he engaged in the real estate business and was collector of internal revenue for San Diego from 1893 to 1902.

== Death and burial ==
Frederick died at age 69 in San Diego. He is interred in Mount Hope Cemetery.
