= 1885 United States House of Representatives elections =

There were six special elections to the United States House of Representatives in 1885 during the 48th and 49th Congresses.

== 48th Congress ==
District	Incumbent			This race	
District	Member	Party	First elected	Results	Candidates
North Carolina 5	Alfred M. Scales	Democratic	1857; 1858 (lost); 1874	Incumbent resigned December 30, 1884, when elected Governor of North Carolina. New member elected January 15, 1885 and seated January 28, 1885. Democratic hold. Winner had already been elected to the next term.	▌ ✓ James W. Reid (Democratic) 90.50%; ▌Joseph S. Worth (Republican) 6.85%; ▌Leonidas C. Edwards (Republican) 1.23%; Scattering 1.42%
Rhode Island 2	Jonathan Chace	Republican	1880	Resigned January 26, 1885, when elected U.S. Senator. New member elected February 5, 1885 and seated February 12, 1885. Republican hold. Winner had already been elected to the next term.	▌ ✓ Nathan F. Dixon III (Republican) 69.35%; ▌Philip W. Hawkins (Democratic) 30.65%

== 49th Congress ==
District	Incumbent			This race	
District	Member	Party	First elected	Results	Candidates
Arkansas 3	James K. Jones	Democratic	1880	Incumbent member-elect resigned during the previous Congress when elected U.S. senator. New member elected September 7, 1885 and seated December 7, 1885. Democratic hold.	▌ ✓ Thomas C. McRae (Democratic) 61.19%; ▌C. E. Mitchell (Republican) 38.81%
Illinois 5	Reuben Ellwood	Republican	1882	Incumbent died July 1, 1885. New member elected November 3, 1885 and seated December 7, 1885. Republican hold.	▌ ✓ Albert J. Hopkins (Republican) 73.51%; ▌Richard Bishop (Democratic) 26.29%
New York 8	Samuel S. Cox	Democratic	1856 (Ohio); 1864 (lost); 1868 (N.Y.)	Incumbent resigned to become U.S. Envoy Extraordinary and Minister Plenipotentiary to the Ottoman Empire. New member elected November 3, 1885. Democratic hold.	▌ ✓ Timothy J. Campbell (Democratic) 51.93%; ▌John Galvin (Republican) 48.07%
Pennsylvania 19	William A. Duncan	Democratic	1882	Incumbent member-elect resigned during previous congress. New member elected November 3, 1885 and seated December 7, 1885. Democratic hold.	▌ ✓ John A. Swope (Democratic) 66.70%; ▌Charles H. Bressler (Republican) 33.30%
