= Daniel Kerr (politician) =

American politician (1836–1916)

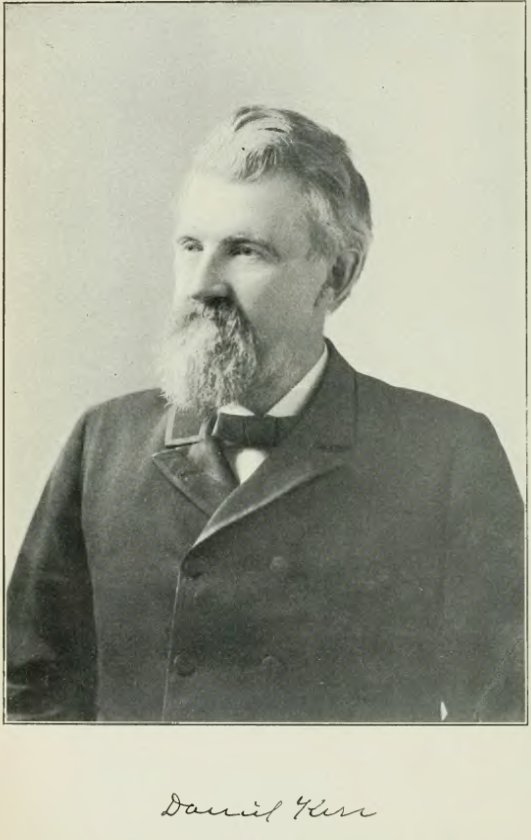

Member of the U.S. House of Representatives from Iowa's 5th district
- In office March 4, 1887 – March 3, 1891
- Preceded by: Benjamin T. Frederick
- Succeeded by: John Taylor Hamilton

Personal details
- Born: June 18, 1836 Dalry, North Ayrshire, Scotland
- Died: October 8, 1916 (aged 80) Grundy Center, Iowa, U.S.
- Party: Republican

Military service
- Branch/service: Union Army
- Years of service: 1862–1864
- Rank: First lieutenant
- Unit: Company G, 117th Illinois Infantry Regiment
- Battles/wars: Civil War

Daniel Kerr (June 18, 1836 – October 8, 1916) was an American politician who served as a two-term Republican U.S. representative from Iowa's 5th congressional district in the 1880s.

== Early life and education ==
Born near Dalry, Ayrshire, Scotland, Kerr emigrated to the United States with his parents, Hugh Kerr and Margaret Galt, settling in Madison County, Illinois, in 1841. He attended the common schools. Kerr graduated from McKendree College in 1858.

== Career ==
After studying law, he was admitted to the bar in 1862 and commenced practice in Edwardsville, Illinois. He enlisted in the Union Army on August 12, 1862. He was promoted to second lieutenant, Company G, 117th Illinois Volunteer Infantry Regiment, in 1863 and to first lieutenant in 1864.

He served as member of the Illinois House of Representatives in 1868, serving until 1870. In 1870 he moved to Grundy Center, Iowa, where he continued to practice law, and also farmed. He was a school director in 1875.

Kerr was elected mayor of Grundy Center, Iowa, in 1877. He was elected to the Iowa House of Representatives in 1883.

In 1886, ran for the Republican nomination to Congress for Iowa's 5th congressional district. At the time of his election, he was the owner of the Grundy Center Argus, a Republican newspaper. A bitter fight in the convention left bruised feelings all around, and the leading Republican newspaper in Cedar Rapids, the Evening Gazette, charged the money-changers had brought about Kerr's nomination. Kerr was elected as a Republican to the 50th United States Congress, unseating incumbent Democrat Benjamin T. Frederick. After re-election in 1888 and service in the Fifty-first Congress, he declined to run for a third term in 1890. In all, he served in Congress from March 4, 1887, to March 3, 1891. After leaving Congress, Kerr resumed the practice of law.

Kerr had served as a delegate to the Republican National Convention in 1888 and 1896. In 1896 he indicated that he supported the free coinage of silver, a position closer to Democratic presidential candidate William Jennings Bryan than to his own party's candidate, William McKinley. Soon thereafter he switched parties, becoming a Democrat.

He was an unsuccessful Democratic candidate for election in 1900 to his former seat in Congress.

== Personal life ==
On November 9, 1861, he married Clara Theresa Estabrook in Edwardsville, Illinois. He moved to Pasadena, California, in 1909 and lived there until 1916, when he returned to Grundy Center, where he died on October 8, 1916. He was interred in Rose Hill Cemetery.

U.S. House of Representatives
Preceded by Benjamin T. Frederick	Member of the U.S. House of Representatives from Iowa's 5th congressional district March 4, 1887–March 3, 1891	Succeeded by John T. Hamilton
