= 1908 United States House of Representatives elections =

House elections for the 61st U.S. Congress

- June 1, September 1, September 14, and November 3, 1908 (Note: Regulars only, not including specials)

All 391 seats in the United States House of Representatives 196 seats needed for a majority
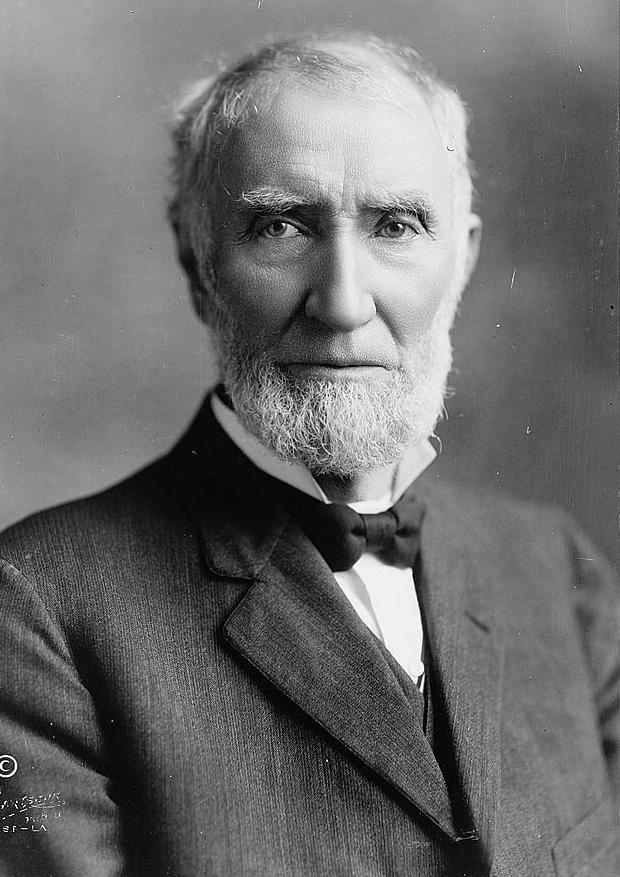

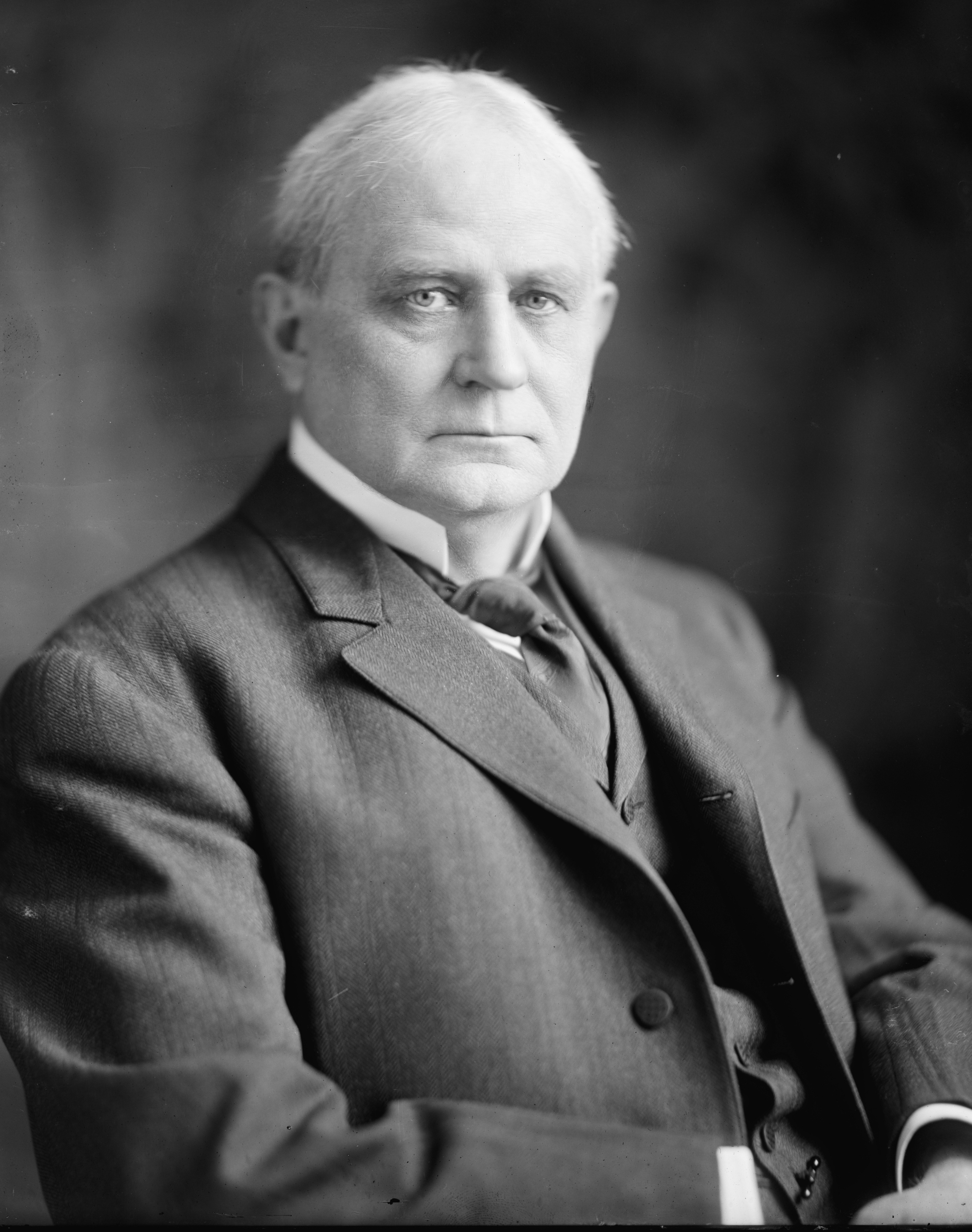
	Majority party	Minority party
Leader	Joseph Cannon	Champ Clark
Party	Republican	Democratic
Leader's seat	Illinois 18th	Missouri 9th
Last election	223 seats	167 seats
Seats won	219	172
Seat change	▼4	▲5
Popular vote	7,227,470	6,552,986
Percentage	50.05%	45.38%
Swing	▲0.01pp	▲1.81pp
	Third party
Party	Independent
Last election	1 seat (Note: One Independent Republican, Peter Porter from the 34th district of New York.)
Seats won	0
Seat change	▼1
Popular vote	61,499
Percentage	0.43%
Swing	Steady
- Results: Republican gain Democratic gain Republican hold Democratic hold
Speaker before election
Joseph Cannon
Republican
Elected Speaker
Joseph Cannon
Republican

The 1908 United States House of Representatives elections were held for the most part on November 3, 1908, with Oregon, Maine, and Vermont holding theirs early in either June or September. They coincided with the 1908 United States presidential election, which William Howard Taft won. Elections were held for all 391 seats of the United States House of Representatives, representing 46 states, to serve in the 61st United States Congress.

Taft was not as popular as his predecessor, Theodore Roosevelt, but won with Roosevelt's backing, and his Republican Party lost only a handful of seats to the opposition Democrats. Without any striking national issues, the Republicans were able to remain in control. Regional issues led to some changes in House membership, but new Democrats who were elected by dissatisfied industrial workers were balanced out by new Republicans who gained seats in districts with a strong middle class presence.

== Election summaries ==
↓
172	219
Democratic	Republican

State	Type	Total seats	Democratic		Republican	
State	Type	Total seats	Seats	Change	Seats	Change
Alabama	District	9	9	Steady	0	Steady
Arkansas	District	7	7	Steady	0	Steady
California	District	8	0	Steady	8	Steady
Colorado	District +at-large	3	3	▲3	0	▼3
Connecticut	District +at-large	5	0	Steady	5	Steady
Delaware	At-large	1	0	Steady	1	Steady
Florida	District	3	3	Steady	0	Steady
Georgia	District	11	11	Steady	0	Steady
Idaho	At-large	1	0	Steady	1	Steady
Illinois	District	25	6	▲1	19	▼1
Indiana	District	13	11	▲7	2	▼7
Iowa	District	11	1	Steady	10	Steady
Kansas	District	8	0	Steady	8	Steady
Kentucky	District	11	8	▲1	3	▼1
Louisiana	District	7	7	Steady	0	Steady
Maine (Note: Elections held early)	District	4	0	Steady	4	Steady
Maryland	District	6	3	Steady	3	Steady
Massachusetts	District	14	3	Steady	11	Steady
Michigan	District	12	0	Steady	12	Steady
Minnesota	District	9	1	Steady	8	Steady
Mississippi	District	8	8	Steady	0	Steady
Missouri	District	16	10	▼2	6	▲2
Montana	At-large	1	0	Steady	1	Steady
Nebraska	District	6	3	▲2	3	▼2
Nevada	At-large	1	1	Steady	0	Steady
New Hampshire	District	2	0	Steady	2	Steady
New Jersey	District	10	3	▼1	7	▲1
New York	District	37	11	Steady	26	Steady
North Carolina	District	10	7	▼3	3	▲3
North Dakota	District	2	0	Steady	2	Steady
Ohio	District	21	8	▲3	13	▼3
Oklahoma	District	5	2	▼2	3	▲2
Oregon	District	2	0	Steady	2	Steady
Pennsylvania	District	32	5	▼2	27	▲2
Rhode Island	District	2	0	▼1	2	▲1
South Carolina	District	7	7	Steady	0	Steady
South Dakota	At-large	2	0	Steady	2	Steady
Tennessee	District	10	8	Steady	2	Steady
Texas	District	16	16	Steady	0	Steady
Utah	At-large	1	0	Steady	1	Steady
Vermont	District	2	0	Steady	2	Steady
Virginia	District	10	9	Steady	1	Steady
Washington	District (Note: Changed from at-large.)	3	0	Steady	3	Steady
West Virginia	District	5	0	Steady	5	Steady
Wisconsin	District	11	1	▼1	10	▲1
Wyoming	At-large	1	0	Steady	1	Steady
Total		391	172 44.0%	▲5	219 56.0%	▼5

Popular vote
Democratic	45.38%
Independent	0.43%
Others	4.14%
Republican	50.05%

House seats
Democratic	43.99%
Independent	0.26%
Republican	55.75%

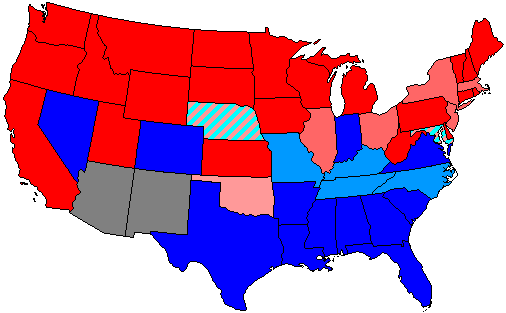
House seats by party holding plurality in state: 80+% Democratic / 80+% Republican; 60+ to 80% Democratic / 60+ to 80% Republican; Up to 60% Democratic / Up to 60% Republican

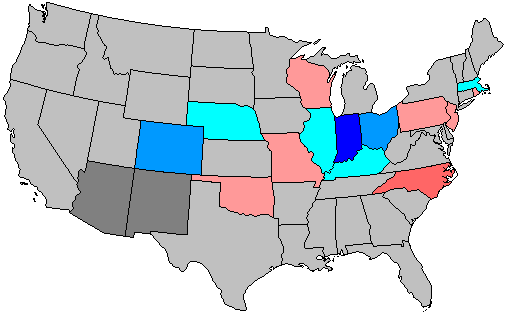
Net gain in party representation: 6+ Democratic gain / 6+ Republican gain; 3–5 Democratic gain / 3–5 Republican gain; 1–2 Democratic gain / 1–2 Republican gain; no net change

== Special elections ==
There were nine special elections in 1908.

District	Incumbent			This race	
District	Member	Party	First elected	Results	Candidates
Illinois 25	George W. Smith	Republican	1902	Incumbent died November 30, 1907. New member elected February 15, 1908. Republican hold.	▌ ✓ Napoleon B. Thistlewood (Republican) 47.17%; ▌William H. Warder (Democratic) 33.16%; ▌Samuel T. Brush (Ind. Republican) 15.34%; ▌Daniel W. Boone (Socialist) 4.33%
Alabama 2	Ariosto A. Wiley	Democratic	1900	Incumbent died June 17, 1908. New member elected November 3, 1908 to finish his brother's term. Democratic hold.	▌ ✓ Oliver C. Wiley (Democratic); Unopposed
Indiana 13	Abraham L. Brick	Republican	1898	Incumbent died April 7, 1908. New member elected November 3, 1908. Democratic gain. Winner was also elected the same day to the next term; see below.	▌ ✓ Henry A. Barnhart (Democratic) 48.42%; ▌Charles W. Miller (Republican) 47.69%; ▌Thomas B. Barnes (Prohibition) 2.02%; ▌John A. Snook (Socialist) 1.79%
Louisiana 1	Adolph Meyer	Democratic	1890	Incumbent died March 8, 1908. New member elected November 3, 1908. Democratic hold. Winner was also elected the same day to the next term; see below.	▌ ✓ Albert Estopinal (Democratic) 95.22%; ▌Henry C. Warmoth (Republican) 4.78%
Maine 2	Charles E. Littlefield	Republican	1899 (special)	Incumbent died September 30, 1908. New member elected November 3, 1908. Republican hold. Winner had already been elected to the next term; see below.	▌ ✓ John P. Swasey (Republican); Unopposed
Maine 4	Llewellyn Powers	Republican	1876; 1878 (lost); 1901 (special)	Incumbent died July 28, 1908. New member elected November 3, 1908. Republican hold. Winner had already been elected to the next term; see below.	▌ ✓ Frank E. Guernsey (Republican) 67.70%; ▌George M. Hanson (Democratic) 32.30%
New York 3	Charles T. Dunwell	Republican	1902	Incumbent died June 12, 1908. New member elected November 3, 1908. Republican hold. Winner was also elected the same day to the next term; see below.	▌ ✓ Otto G. Foelker (Republican) 50.28%; ▌James P. Maher (Democratic) 41.68%; ▌Elias B. Gordon (Independence) 4.02%; ▌John T. Hill (Socialist) 4.02%
South Dakota at-large	William H. Parker	Republican	1906	Incumbent died June 26, 1908. New member elected November 3, 1908. Republican hold. Winner was also elected the same day to the next term; see below.	▌ ✓ Eben Martin (Republican) 62.33%; ▌W. W. Soule (Democratic) 37.67%

== Regular election dates ==
All the states held their regular elections November 3, 1908 except for three, which, held elections:

- June 1: Oregon (Note: This was the last year that Oregon held its congressional elections early.)
- September 1: Vermont
- September 14: Maine

== Alabama ==
District	Incumbent			This race	
District	Member	Party	First elected	Results	Candidates
Alabama 1	George W. Taylor	Democratic	1896	Incumbent re-elected.	▌ ✓ George W. Taylor (Democratic) 100%
Alabama 2	Oliver C. Wiley	Democratic	1908	Incumbent retired. Democratic hold.	▌ ✓ S. Hubert Dent Jr. (Democratic) 100%
Alabama 3	Henry D. Clayton Jr.	Democratic	1896	Incumbent re-elected.	▌ ✓ Henry D. Clayton Jr. (Democratic) 100%
Alabama 4	William Benjamin Craig	Democratic	1906	Incumbent re-elected.	▌ ✓ William Benjamin Craig (Democratic) 65.1%; ▌ J. Osmond Middleton (Republican) 34.9%
Alabama 5	J. Thomas Heflin	Democratic	1904	Incumbent re-elected.	▌ ✓ J. Thomas Heflin (Democratic) 83.9%; ▌ W. W. Wadsworth (Republican) 16.1%
Alabama 6	Richmond P. Hobson	Democratic	1906	Incumbent re-elected.	▌ ✓ Richmond P. Hobson (Democratic) 78.0%; ▌ Henry T. Nations (Republican) 22.0%
Alabama 7	John L. Burnett	Democratic	1898	Incumbent re-elected.	▌ ✓ John L. Burnett (Democratic) 56.0%; ▌ Newman H. Freeman (Republican) 44.0%
Alabama 8	William Richardson	Democratic	1900	Incumbent re-elected.	▌ ✓ William Richardson (Democratic) 82.7%; ▌ Jeremiah Murphy (Republican) 17.3%
Alabama 9	Oscar Underwood	Democratic	1894	Incumbent re-elected.	▌ ✓ Oscar Underwood (Democratic) 79.4%; ▌ J. B. Sloan (Republican) 18.1%; ▌ W. G. Emiel (Independent) 2.4%

== Alaska Territory ==
See Non-voting delegates, below.

== Arizona Territory ==
See Non-voting delegates, below.

== Arkansas ==
District	Incumbent			This race	
District	Member	Party	First elected	Results	Candidates
Arkansas 1	Robert B. Macon	Democratic	1902	Incumbent re-elected.	▌ ✓ Robert B. Macon (Democratic) 66.5%; ▌ C.T. Bloodworth (Republican) 33.5%
Arkansas 2	Stephen Brundidge Jr.	Democratic	1896	Incumbent retired to run for Governor of Arkansas. Democratic hold.	▌ ✓ William A. Oldfield (Democratic) 63.8%; ▌ H. H. Myers (Republican) 36.2%
Arkansas 3	John C. Floyd	Democratic	1904	Incumbent re-elected.	▌ ✓ John C. Floyd (Democratic) 59.9%; ▌ W. T. Mills (Republican) 40.1%
Arkansas 4	William B. Cravens	Democratic	1906	Incumbent re-elected.	▌ ✓ William B. Cravens (Democratic) 59.8%; ▌ Edwin Mechem (Republican) 40.1%
Arkansas 5	Charles C. Reid	Democratic	1900	Incumbent re-elected.	▌ ✓ Charles C. Reid (Democratic) 66.1%; ▌ Guy W. Caron (Republican) 33.9%
Arkansas 6	Joseph T. Robinson	Democratic	1902	Incumbent re-elected.	▌ ✓ Joseph T. Robinson (Democratic) 100%
Arkansas 7	Robert M. Wallace	Democratic	1902	Incumbent re-elected.	▌ ✓ Robert M. Wallace (Democratic) 59.8%; ▌ S. R. Young (Republican) 40.2%

== California ==
District	Incumbent			This race	
District	Member	Party	First elected	Results	Candidates
California 1	William F. Englebright	Republican	1906	Incumbent re-elected.	▌ ✓ William F. Englebright (Republican) 54.1%; ▌E. W. Holland (Democratic) 36.8%; ▌D. N. Cunningham (Socialist) 7.6%; ▌W. P. Fassett (Prohibition) 1.4%
California 2	Duncan E. McKinlay	Republican	1904	Incumbent re-elected.	▌ ✓ Duncan E. McKinlay (Republican) 57.5%; ▌W. K. Hays (Democratic) 38.5%; ▌A. J. Gaylord (Socialist) 4.0%
California 3	Joseph R. Knowland	Republican	1904	Incumbent re-elected.	▌ ✓ Joseph R. Knowland (Republican) 64.1%; ▌George W. Peckham (Democratic) 22.8%; ▌Owen H. Philbrick (Socialist) 9.3%; ▌John A. Sands (Independence) 2.1%; ▌Thomas H. Montgomery (Prohibition) 1.7%
California 4	Julius Kahn	Republican	1898	Incumbent re-elected.	▌ ✓ Julius Kahn (Republican) 52.7%; ▌James G. Maguire (Democratic) 42.9%; ▌K. J. Doyle (Socialist) 4.0%; ▌William N. Meserve (Prohibition) 0.3%
California 5	Everis A. Hayes	Republican	1904	Incumbent re-elected.	▌ ✓ Everis A. Hayes (Republican) 49.1%; ▌George A. Tracy (Democratic) 42.8%; ▌E. H. Misner (Socialist) 6.3%; ▌Walter E. Vail (Prohibition) 1.8%
California 6	James C. Needham	Republican	1898	Incumbent re-elected.	▌ ✓ James C. Needham (Republican) 52%; ▌Fred P. Feliz (Democratic) 38.7%; ▌W. M. Pattison (Socialist) 5.6%; ▌James W. Webb (Prohibition) 3.7%
California 7	James McLachlan	Republican	1900	Incumbent re-elected.	▌ ✓ James McLachlan (Republican) 91.5%; ▌Jud R. Rush (Democratic) 6.3%; ▌A. R. Holston (Socialist) 1.1%; ▌Marshall W. Atwood (Prohibition) 1.0%; ▌F. G. Hentig (Independence) 0.2%
California 8	Sylvester C. Smith	Republican	1904	Incumbent re-elected.	▌ ✓ Sylvester C. Smith (Republican) 55.7%; ▌W. E. Shepherd (Democratic) 34.7%; ▌Noble A. Richardson (Socialist) 9.6%

== Colorado ==
District	Incumbent			This race	
District	Member	Party	First elected	Results	Candidates
Colorado 1	Robert W. Bonynge	Republican	1902 (contest)	Incumbent lost re-election. Democratic gain.	▌ ✓ Atterson W. Rucker (Democratic) 49.9%; ▌Robert W. Bonynge (Republican) 47.4%; ▌S. J. Greear (Socialist) 2.8%
Colorado 2	Warren A. Haggott	Republican	1906	Incumbent lost re-election. Democratic gain.	▌ ✓ John A. Martin (Democratic) 48.7%; ▌Warren A. Haggott (Republican) 47.8%; ▌Flavius E. Ashburn (Socialist) 3.5%
Colorado at-large	George W. Cook	Republican	1906	Incumbent retired. Democratic gain.	▌ ✓ Edward T. Taylor (Democratic) 48.4%; ▌James C. Burger (Republican) 46.2%; ▌M. M. Brown (Socialist) 3.1%; ▌Willard McCarthy (Prohibition) 2.4%

== Connecticut ==
District	Incumbent			This race	
District	Member	Party	First elected	Results	Candidates
Connecticut 1	E. Stevens Henry	Republican	1894	Incumbent re-elected.	▌ ✓ E. Stevens Henry (Republican) 59.5%; ▌Charles S. Gerth (Democratic) 34.6%; Others: ▌Thomas Lisk (Socialist) 3.2%; ▌Duane N. Griffin (Prohibition) 2.1%; ▌Charles J. Backofen (Soc. Labor) 0.5%
Connecticut 2	Nehemiah D. Sperry	Republican	1894	Incumbent re-elected.	▌ ✓ Nehemiah D. Sperry (Republican) 55.0%; ▌Thomas L. Reilly (Democratic) 40.9%; ▌Alfred W. Smith (Socialist) 3.1%; Others: ▌A. Judson Bolster (Prohibition) 0.8%; ▌Charles B. Wells (Soc. Labor) 0.2%
Connecticut 3	Edwin W. Higgins	Republican	1905 (special)	Incumbent re-elected.	▌ ✓ Edwin W. Higgins (Republican) 60.3%; ▌Henry H. Hunter (Democratic) 37.1%; Others: ▌Jason L. Randall (Prohibition) 1.2%; ▌Albert J. Boardman (Socialist) 1.2%; ▌John J. Murphy (Soc. Labor) 0.2%
Connecticut 4	Ebenezer J. Hill	Republican	1894	Incumbent re-elected.	▌ ✓ Ebenezer J. Hill (Republican) 60.7%; ▌Lynn W. Wilson (Democratic) 35.9%; Others: ▌Samiel E. Beardsley (Socialist) 2.1%; ▌Wilbur G. Manchester (Prohibition) 1.0%; ▌Thomas Wilkes (Soc. Labor) 0.4%
Connecticut at-large	George L. Lilley	Republican	1904	Incumbent retired to run for governor. Republican hold.	▌ ✓ John Q. Tilson (Republican) 58.6%; ▌Christopher L. Avery (Democratic) 36.8%; ▌Jasper McLevy (Socialist) 2.7%; Others: ▌Elisha Y. Ellis (Prohibition) 1.2%; ▌Edward Prior (Soc. Labor) 0.3%

== Delaware ==
District	Incumbent			This race	
District	Member	Party	First elected	Results	Candidates
Delaware at-large	Hiram R. Burton	Republican	1904	Incumbent lost renomination. Republican hold.	▌ ✓ William H. Heald (Republican) 50.7%; ▌ L. Irving Handy (Democratic) 46.9%; ▌ William E. Hawkins (Prohibition) 1.9%; ▌ Frank A. Houck (Socialist) 0.5%

== Florida ==
District	Incumbent			This race	
District	Member	Party	First elected	Results	Candidates
Florida 1	Stephen M. Sparkman	Democratic	1894	Incumbent re-elected.	▌ ✓ Stephen M. Sparkman (Democratic) 75.2%; ▌George W. Allen (Republican) 15.0%; ▌C. C. Allen (Socialist) 9.8%
Florida 2	Frank Clark	Democratic	1904	Incumbent re-elected.	▌ ✓ Frank Clark (Democratic) 75.9%; ▌William R. O'Neal (Republican) 18.0%; ▌A. N. Jackson (Socialist) 6.1%
Florida 3	William B. Lamar	Democratic	1902	Incumbent retired to run for U.S. senator. Democratic hold	▌ ✓ Dannite H. Mays (Democratic) 80.2%; ▌William Northrup (Republican) 14.7%; ▌C. N. Woods (Socialist) 3.6%

== Georgia ==
District	Incumbent			This race	
District	Member	Party	First elected	Results	Candidates
Georgia 1	Charles G. Edwards	Democratic	1906	Incumbent re-elected.	▌ ✓ Charles G. Edwards (Democratic) 95.7%; ▌ James M. Elders (Republican) 4.3%
Georgia 2	James M. Griggs	Democratic	1896	Incumbent re-elected.	▌ ✓ James M. Griggs (Democratic) 100%
Georgia 3	Elijah B. Lewis	Democratic	1896	Incumbent lost renomination. Democratic hold.	▌ ✓ Dudley M. Hughes (Democratic) 99.7%
Georgia 4	William C. Adamson	Democratic	1896	Incumbent re-elected.	▌ ✓ William C. Adamson (Democratic) 100%
Georgia 5	Leonidas F. Livingston	Democratic	1890	Incumbent re-elected.	▌ ✓ Leonidas F. Livingston (Democratic) 100%
Georgia 6	Charles L. Bartlett	Democratic	1894	Incumbent re-elected.	▌ ✓ Charles L. Bartlett (Democratic) 100%
Georgia 7	Gordon Lee	Democratic	1904	Incumbent re-elected.	▌ ✓ Gordon Lee (Democratic) 100%
Georgia 8	William M. Howard	Democratic	1896	Incumbent re-elected.	▌ ✓ William M. Howard (Democratic) 100%
Georgia 9	Thomas M. Bell	Democratic	1904	Incumbent re-elected.	▌ ✓ Thomas M. Bell (Democratic) 100%
Georgia 10	Thomas W. Hardwick	Democratic	1902	Incumbent re-elected.	▌ ✓ Thomas W. Hardwick (Democratic) 100%
Georgia 11	William G. Brantley	Democratic	1896	Incumbent re-elected.	▌ ✓ William G. Brantley (Democratic) 100%

== Idaho ==
District	Incumbent			This race	
District	Member	Party	First elected	Results	Candidates
Idaho at-large	Burton L. French	Republican	1902	Incumbent lost renomination. Republican hold.	▌ ✓ Thomas R. Hamer (Republican) 52.0%; ▌James L. McClear (Democratic) 39.2%; ▌Halbert Barton (Socialist) 6.5%; ▌William G. Light (Prohibition) 2.2%; ▌Ernest C. Grant (Independence) 0.1%

== Illinois ==
District	Incumbent			This race	
District	Member	Party	First elected	Results	Candidates
Illinois 1	Martin B. Madden	Republican	1904	Incumbent re-elected.	▌ ✓ Martin B. Madden (Republican) 60.9%; ▌ Matthew L. Mandable (Democratic) 35.7%; ▌ Joseph N. Greer (Socialist) 2.2%; ▌ Henry W. Young (Independence) 1.2%
Illinois 2	James Robert Mann	Republican	1896	Incumbent re-elected.	▌ ✓ James Robert Mann (Republican) 64.8%; ▌ John T. Donahoe (Democratic) 29.0%; ▌ Bernard Berlyn (Socialist) 4.2%; ▌ Frank V. Irish (Prohibition) 2.0%
Illinois 3	William Warfield Wilson	Republican	1902	Incumbent re-elected.	▌ ✓ William Warfield Wilson (Republican) 56.0%; ▌ Fred J. Crowley (Democratic) 35.8%; ▌ Charles F. Woerner (Socialist) 3.8%; ▌ A. F. Anderson (Prohibition) 2.7%; ▌ David C. Wagner Jr. (Independence) 1.7%
Illinois 4	James T. McDermott	Democratic	1906	Incumbent re-elected.	▌ ✓ James T. McDermott (Democratic) 54.7%; ▌ Charles S. Wharton (Republican) 40.2%; ▌ Frederick G. Wellman (Socialist) 4.3%; ▌ J. P. Baldwin (Prohibition) 0.8%
Illinois 5	Adolph J. Sabath	Democratic	1906	Incumbent re-elected.	▌ ✓ Adolph J. Sabath (Democratic) 53.3%; ▌ Anthony Michalek (Republican) 40.5%; ▌ Morris Siskind (Socialist) 5.3%; ▌ Carl P. Graff (Prohibition) 0.9%
Illinois 6	William Lorimer	Republican	1902	Incumbent re-elected.	▌ ✓ William Lorimer (Republican) 61.1%; ▌ Frank C. Wood (Democratic) 32.1%; ▌ James A. Jarvis (Socialist) 3.1%; ▌ Samuel J. Clark (Prohibition) 2.4%; ▌ Willis D. Casey (Independence) 1.3%
Illinois 7	Philip Knopf	Republican	1902	Incumbent retired. Republican hold.	▌ ✓ Frederick Lundin (Republican) 54.1%; ▌ Frank Buchanan (Democratic) 34.5%; ▌ George Koop (Socialist) 7.2%; ▌ Orrin R. Jenks (Prohibition) 2.3%; ▌ Patrick F. Quigley (Independence) 1.9%
Illinois 8	Charles McGavin	Republican	1904	Incumbent retired. Democratic gain.	▌ ✓ Thomas Gallagher (Democratic) 49.2%; ▌ Philip M. Ksycki (Republican) 45.2%; ▌ Thomas McLean (Socialist) 4.6%; ▌ Charles A. Bonnet (Independence) 1.0%
Illinois 9	Henry Sherman Boutell	Republican	1897	Incumbent re-elected.	▌ ✓ Henry Sherman Boutell (Republican) 56.3%; ▌ Charles C. Stilwell (Democratic) 36.1%; ▌ J. Mahlon Barnes (Socialist) 4.7%; ▌ John O. Johnson (Prohibition) 1.6%; ▌ Eugene V. Putnam (Independence) 1.3%
Illinois 10	George E. Foss	Republican	1894	Incumbent re-elected.	▌ ✓ George E. Foss (Republican) 62.0%; ▌ Western Starr (Democratic) 29.6%; ▌ A. M. Simons (Socialist) 4.0%; ▌ Charles O. Boring (Prohibition) 2.6%; ▌ F. E. Rutledge (Independence) 1.8%
Illinois 11	Howard M. Snapp	Republican	1902	Incumbent re-elected.	▌ ✓ Howard M. Snapp (Republican) 61.2%; ▌ Coll McNaughton (Democratic) 32.6%; ▌ Frederick F. Farmiloe (Prohibition) 4.6%; ▌ F. L. Raymond (Socialist) 1.6%
Illinois 12	Charles Eugene Fuller	Republican	1902	Incumbent re-elected.	▌ ✓ Charles Eugene Fuller (Republican) 65.4%; ▌ M. N. Armstrong (Democratic) 27.1%; ▌ Charles L. Logan (Prohibition) 4.0%; ▌ Joseph McCabe (Socialist) 3.5%
Illinois 13	Frank O. Lowden	Republican	1906	Incumbent re-elected.	▌ ✓ Frank O. Lowden (Republican) 61.4%; ▌ William C. Green (Democratic) 32.9%; ▌ F. W. Emerson (Prohibition) 4.9%; ▌ George W. Ashford (Socialist) 0.8%
Illinois 14	James McKinney	Republican	1905	Incumbent re-elected.	▌ ✓ James McKinney (Republican) 54.3%; ▌ Matt J. McEniry (Democratic) 38.9%; ▌ W. L. Clark (Prohibition) 3.6%; ▌ Harry Strom (Socialist) 3.2%
Illinois 15	George W. Prince	Republican	1895	Incumbent re-elected.	▌ ✓ George W. Prince (Republican) 50.9%; ▌ W. Emery Lancaster (Democratic) 42.6%; ▌ William W. Vose (Prohibition) 3.3%; ▌ Edward L. Switzer (Socialist) 3.2%
Illinois 16	Joseph V. Graff	Republican	1894	Incumbent re-elected.	▌ ✓ Joseph V. Graff (Republican) 53.2%; ▌ James W. Hill (Democratic) 41.3%; ▌ George W. Warner (Prohibition) 3.0%; ▌ Jefferson T. White (Socialist) 2.5%
Illinois 17	John A. Sterling	Republican	1902	Incumbent re-elected.	▌ ✓ John A. Sterling (Republican) 53.2%; ▌ C. S. Schneider (Democratic) 40.5%; ▌ William P. Allin (Prohibition) 5.4%; ▌ J. A. Landers (Socialist) 0.9%
Illinois 18	Joseph Gurney Cannon	Republican	1892	Incumbent re-elected.	▌ ✓ Joseph Gurney Cannon (Republican) 54.9%; ▌ Henry C. Bell (Democratic) 41.0%; ▌ G. B. Winter (Prohibition) 3.2%; ▌ C. V. Walls (Socialist) 0.9%
Illinois 19	William B. McKinley	Republican	1904	Incumbent re-elected.	▌ ✓ William B. McKinley (Republican) 52.9%; ▌ Fred B. Hamil (Democratic) 43.1%; ▌ J. N. Baker (Prohibition) 3.4%; ▌ Lynn N. Williams (Socialist) 0.6%
Illinois 20	Henry T. Rainey	Democratic	1902	Incumbent re-elected.	▌ ✓ Henry T. Rainey (Democratic) 55.3%; ▌ James H. Danskin (Republican) 40.8%; ▌ John E. Vertrees (Prohibition) 2.8%; ▌ William L. Heberling (Socialist) 1.1%
Illinois 21	Ben F. Caldwell	Democratic	1906	Incumbent retired. Democratic hold.	▌ ✓ James M. Graham (Democratic) 47.9%; ▌ H. Clay Wilson (Republican) 44.4%; ▌ William Brandon (Prohibition) 4.9%; ▌ William Keoning-Kraemer (Socialist) 2.8%
Illinois 22	William A. Rodenberg	Republican	1902	Incumbent re-elected.	▌ ✓ William A. Rodenberg (Republican) 50.2%; ▌ Charles A. Karch (Democratic) 43.9%; ▌ John W. Taunt (Socialist) 3.9%; ▌ A. J. Meek (Prohibition) 2.0%
Illinois 23	Martin D. Foster	Democratic	1906	Incumbent re-elected.	▌ ✓ Martin D. Foster (Democratic) 53.6%; ▌ Frank S. Dickson (Republican) 45.2%; ▌ H. T. Davis (Socialist) 1.2%
Illinois 24	Pleasant T. Chapman	Republican	1904	Incumbent re-elected.	▌ ✓ Pleasant T. Chapman (Republican) 52.4%; ▌ John Q. A. Ledbetter (Democratic) 44.0%; ▌ Charles R. Montgomery (Prohibition) 2.6%; ▌ John Snyder (Socialist) 1.0%
Illinois 25	Napoleon B. Thistlewood	Republican	1908	Incumbent re-elected.	▌ ✓ Napoleon B. Thistlewood (Republican) 51.6%; ▌ I. R. Spilman (Democratic) 43.6%; ▌ P. E. Michaels (Prohibition) 2.7%; ▌ Daniel Boone (Socialist) 2.1%

== Indiana ==
District	Incumbent			This race	
District	Member	Party	First elected	Results	Candidates
Indiana 1	John H. Foster	Republican	1905	Incumbent lost re-election. Democratic gain.	▌ ✓ John W. Boehne (Democratic) 48.3%; ▌ John H. Foster (Republican) 48.1%; ▌ Paul D. Strong (Socialist) 2.5%; ▌ David W. Hill (Prohibition) 1.0%; ▌ Fred L. Hisgen (Independence) 0.1%
Indiana 2	John C. Chaney	Republican	1904	Incumbent lost re-election. Democratic gain.	▌ ✓ William A. Cullop (Democratic) 50.0%; ▌ John C. Chaney (Republican) 45.3%; ▌ George W. Lackey (Socialist) 3.4%; ▌ John A. Rowe (Prohibition) 1.3%
Indiana 3	William E. Cox	Democratic	1906	Incumbent re-elected.	▌ ✓ William E. Cox (Democratic) 54.3%; ▌ John W. Lewis (Republican) 43.1%; ▌ George E. Flanigan (Prohibition) 1.8%; ▌ Joseph W. Schwartz (Socialist) 0.7%; ▌ David J. Murr (Independence) 0.1%
Indiana 4	Lincoln Dixon	Democratic	1904	Incumbent re-elected.	▌ ✓ Lincoln Dixon (Democratic) 53.6%; ▌ James A. Cox (Republican) 44.0%; ▌ Henry J. Bigney (Prohibition) 1.8%; ▌ Albert S. Bumpas (Socialist) 0.6%
Indiana 5	Elias S. Holliday	Republican	1900	Incumbent retired. Democratic gain.	▌ ✓ Ralph W. Moss (Democratic) 48.9%; ▌ Howard Maxwell (Republican) 46.4%; ▌ W. D. Vanhorn (Socialist) 2.6%; ▌ Edward M. Woodward (Prohibition) 2.0%; ▌ D. C. Brackney (Independence) 0.1%
Indiana 6	James E. Watson	Republican	1898	Incumbent retired to run for Governor of Indiana. Republican hold.	▌ ✓ William O. Barnard (Republican) 49.2%; ▌ Thomas H. Kuhn (Democratic) 47.2%; ▌ Aaron Worth (Prohibition) 2.6%; ▌ Jefferson Cox (Socialist) 1.0%
Indiana 7	Jesse Overstreet	Republican	1894	Incumbent lost re-election. Democratic gain.	▌ ✓ Charles A. Korbly (Democratic) 49.2%; ▌ Jesse Overstreet (Republican) 48.2%; ▌ Joseph A. Gabriel (Socialist) 1.4%; ▌ Charles M. Lemon (Prohibition) 1.1%; ▌ Matthew C. Mayhew (Independence) 0.1%
Indiana 8	John A. M. Adair	Democratic	1906	Incumbent re-elected.	▌ ✓ John A. M. Adair (Democratic) 52.5%; ▌ Nathan B. Hawkins (Republican) 42.9%; ▌ Willard A. Bartlett (Prohibition) 2.4%; ▌ Wallace B. Wattles (Socialist) 2.1%; ▌ Nathan H. Baker (Independence) 0.1%
Indiana 9	Charles B. Landis	Republican	1896	Incumbent lost re-election. Democratic gain.	▌ ✓ Martin A. Morrison (Democratic) 48.9%; ▌ Charles B. Landis (Republican) 47.0%; ▌ Albert B. Kirkpatrick (Prohibition) 3.3%; ▌ Granville W. Sharp (Socialist) 0.7%; ▌ Rheno W. Isherwood (Independence) 0.1%
Indiana 10	Edgar D. Crumpacker	Republican	1896	Incumbent re-elected.	▌ ✓ Edgar D. Crumpacker (Republican) 54.4%; ▌ William Darroch (Democratic) 44.1%; ▌ Isaac S. Wade (Prohibition) 1.4%; ▌ Everett G. Ballard (Independence) 0.1%
Indiana 11	George W. Rauch	Democratic	1906	Incumbent re-elected.	▌ ✓ George W. Rauch (Democratic) 48.3%; ▌ Charles H. Good (Republican) 46.0%; ▌ Oliver W. Outland (Prohibition) 4.4%; ▌ Edward G. Nix (Socialist) 1.4%
Indiana 12	Clarence C. Gilhams	Republican	1906	Incumbent lost re-election. Democratic gain.	▌ ✓ Cyrus Cline (Democratic) 50.6%; ▌ Clarence C. Gilhams (Republican) 45.8%; ▌ Charles Eckhark (Prohibition) 2.2%; ▌ John S. Brunskill (Socialist) 1.1%; ▌ Charles A. Phelps (Independence) 0.3%
Indiana 13	Henry A. Barnhart	Democratic	1908	Incumbent re-elected	▌ ✓ Henry A. Barnhart (Democratic) 48.2%; ▌ Charles W. Miller (Republican) 47.7%; ▌ Levi Newman (Prohibition) 2.1%; ▌ Robert E. Dunbar (Socialist) 1.9%; ▌ William A. Weiser (Independence) 0.1%

== Iowa ==
District	Incumbent			This race	
District	Member	Party	First elected	Results	Candidates
Iowa 1	Charles A. Kennedy	Republican	1906	Incumbent re-elected.	▌ ✓ Charles A. Kennedy (Republican) 51.2%; ▌ George S. Tracy (Democratic) 46.7%; ▌ George W. Holmes (Prohibition) 1.3%; ▌ Charles H. Schick (Socialist) 0.8%
Iowa 2	Albert F. Dawson	Republican	1904	Incumbent re-elected.	▌ ✓ Albert F. Dawson (Republican) 51.0%; ▌ Mark A. Walsh (Democratic) 46.9%; ▌ Michael T. Kennedy (Socialist) 1.7%; ▌ Sam Whitlock (Prohibition) 0.4%
Iowa 3	Benjamin P. Birdsall	Republican	1902	Incumbent retired. Republican hold.	▌ ✓ Charles E. Pickett (Republican) 57.6%; ▌ Charles Elliott (Democratic) 39.2%; ▌ Edgar E. Printnall (Prohibition) 1.7%; ▌ Noah Garwick (Socialist) 1.5%
Iowa 4	Gilbert N. Haugen	Republican	1898	Incumbent re-elected.	▌ ✓ Gilbert N. Haugen (Republican) 55.3%; ▌ M. E. Geiser (Democratic) 43.1%; ▌ J. E. Smith (Prohibition) 1.0%; ▌ C. J. Thorgrimson (Socialist) 0.6%
Iowa 5	Robert G. Cousins	Republican	1892	Incumbent retired. Republican hold.	▌ ✓ James W. Good (Republican) 57.3%; ▌ Samuel K. Tracy (Democratic) 40.2%; ▌ C.P. Whitmore (Prohibition) 1.6%; ▌ L. A. Hanson (Socialist) 0.9%
Iowa 6	Daniel W. Hamilton	Democratic	1906	Incumbent lost re-election. Republican gain.	▌ ✓ Nathan E. Kendall (Republican) 48.3%; ▌ Daniel W. Hamilton (Democratic) 47.6%; ▌ W. C. Minnick (Socialist) 2.3%; ▌ B. W. Ayers (Prohibition) 1.8%
Iowa 7	John A. T. Hull	Republican	1890	Incumbent re-elected.	▌ ✓ John A. T. Hull (Republican) 55.7%; ▌ Charles O. Holley (Democratic) 39.4%; ▌ Ira B. Kellogg (Prohibition) 2.9%; ▌ W. C. Hills (Socialist) 1.9%; ▌ D. T, Blodgett (Independence) 0.1%
Iowa 8	William P. Hepburn	Republican	1892	Incumbent lost re-election. Democratic gain.	▌ ✓ William Darius Jamieson (Democratic) 49.2%; ▌ William P. Hepburn (Republican) 48.4%; ▌ George S. Frazier (Prohibition) 1.2%; ▌ S. D. Mercer (Socialist) 1.2%
Iowa 9	Walter I. Smith	Republican	1900	Incumbent re-elected.	▌ ✓ Walter I. Smith (Republican) 55.8%; ▌ R. C. Spencer (Democratic) 42.4%; ▌ J. J. Kelly (Prohibition) 0.9%; ▌ Walter Cook (Socialist) 0.9%
Iowa 10	James P. Conner	Republican	1900	Incumbent lost renomination. Republican hold.	▌ ✓ Frank P. Woods (Republican) 61.4%; ▌ Montague Hakes (Democratic) 35.8%; ▌ Joseph W. Woodward (Prohibition) 1.6%; ▌ George F. Bretchel (Socialist) 1.2%
Iowa 11	Elbert H. Hubbard	Republican	1904	Incumbent re-elected.	▌ ✓ Elbert H. Hubbard (Republican) 57.1%; ▌ W. G. Sears (Democratic) 40.9%; ▌ Newton Meltor (Prohibition) 1.1%; ▌ A. W. Beach (Socialist) 0.9%

== Kansas ==
District	Incumbent			This race	
District	Member	Party	First elected	Results	Candidates
Kansas 1	Daniel R. Anthony Jr.	Republican	1907 (special)	Incumbent re-elected.	▌ ✓ Daniel R. Anthony Jr. (Republican) 57.6%; ▌F. M. Pearl (Democratic) 41.1%; ▌John F. Willetts (Socialist) 1.3%
Kansas 2	Charles F. Scott	Republican	1900	Incumbent re-elected.	▌ ✓ Charles F. Scott (Republican) 50.5%; ▌B. J. Sheridan (Democratic) 46.5%; ▌S. M. Stallard (Socialist) 2.3%; ▌D. A. W. Johnson (Prohibition) 0.7%
Kansas 3	Philip P. Campbell	Republican	1902	Incumbent re-elected.	▌ ✓ Philip P. Campbell (Republican) 49.8%; ▌T. J. Hudson (Democratic) 39.8%; ▌Ben F. Wilson (Socialist) 9.8%; ▌J. B. Cook (Prohibition) 0.6%
Kansas 4	James Monroe Miller	Republican	1898	Incumbent re-elected.	▌ ✓ James Monroe Miller (Republican) 55.3%; ▌Thomas H. Grisham (Democratic) 42.2%; ▌W. J. Millikin (Socialist) 1.5%; ▌E. C. Lindley (Prohibition) 1.0%
Kansas 5	William A. Calderhead	Republican	1894; 1896 (lost); 1898	Incumbent re-elected.	▌ ✓ William A. Calderhead (Republican) 51.56%; ▌R. A. Lovitt (Democratic) 45.36%; ▌W. L. Nixon (Socialist) 2.01%; ▌William H. Eaton (Prohibition) 1.07%
Kansas 6	William A. Reeder	Republican	1898	Incumbent re-elected.	▌ ✓ William A. Reeder (Republican) 48.58%; ▌John R. Connelly (Democratic) 47.97%; ▌H. M. Elliot (Socialist) 2.10%; ▌F. C. Griffith (Prohibition) 1.35%
Kansas 7	Edmond H. Madison	Republican	1906	Incumbent re-elected.	▌ ✓ Edmond H. Madison (Republican) 52.55%; ▌Samuel I. Hale (Democratic) 42.85%; ▌J. N. Brown (Socialist) 2.83%; ▌Harry R. Ross (Prohibition) 1.78%
Kansas 8	Victor Murdock	Republican	1903	Incumbent re-elected.	▌ ✓ Victor Murdock (Republican) 56.4%; ▌Frank B. Lawrence (Democratic) 39.9%; ▌A. A. Roe (Socialist) 2.4%; ▌Robert Piatt (Prohibition) 1.3%

== Kentucky ==
District	Incumbent			This race	
District	Member	Party	First elected	Results	Candidates
Kentucky 1	Ollie Murray James	Democratic	1902	Incumbent re-elected.	▌ ✓ Ollie Murray James (Democratic) 64.1%; ▌ Jerry M. Porter (Republican) 35.4%; ▌ I. O. Ford (Prohibition) 0.5%
Kentucky 2	Augustus Owsley Stanley	Democratic	1902	Incumbent re-elected.	▌ ✓ Augustus Owsley Stanley (Democratic) 54.3%; ▌ John C. Worsham (Republican) 45.0%; ▌ Elmer Farley (Socialist) 0.7%
Kentucky 3	Addison James	Republican	1906	Incumbent lost re-election. Democratic gain.	▌ ✓ Robert Y. Thomas Jr. (Democratic) 49.8%; ▌ Addison James (Republican) 48.6%; ▌ John M. Greer (Prohibition) 0.9%; ▌ John T. Smith (Socialist) 0.7%
Kentucky 4	Ben Johnson	Democratic	1906	Incumbent re-elected.	▌ ✓ Ben Johnson (Democratic) 53.2%; ▌ D. W. Gaddie (Republican) 46.4%; ▌ James Redmond (Socialist) 0.4%
Kentucky 5	J. Swagar Sherley	Democratic	1902	Incumbent re-elected.	▌ ✓ J. Swagar Sherley (Democratic) 51.7%; ▌ R. C. Kinkead (Republican) 47.1%; ▌ Chase Dobbs (Socialist) 1.2%
Kentucky 6	Joseph L. Rhinock	Democratic	1904	Incumbent re-elected.	▌ ✓ Joseph L. Rhinock (Democratic) 56.7%; ▌ John R. Inglis (Republican) 42.7%; ▌ John Thobe (Prohibition) 0.6%
Kentucky 7	William P. Kimball	Democratic	1906	Incumbent retired. Democratic hold.	▌ ✓ J. Campbell Cantrill (Democratic) 59.0%; ▌ L. L. Bristow (Republican) 41.0%
Kentucky 8	Harvey Helm	Democratic	1906	Incumbent re-elected.	▌ ✓ Harvey Helm (Democratic) 51.8%; ▌ L. W. Benthrum (Republican) 46.9%; ▌ Andrew Johnson (Prohibition) 1.3%
Kentucky 9	Joseph B. Bennett	Republican	1904	Incumbent re-elected.	▌ ✓ Joseph B. Bennett (Republican) 50.0%; ▌ James N. Kehoe (Democratic) 48.4%; ▌ A. N. Morris (Prohibition) 1.0%; ▌ E. Roberts (Socialist) 0.6%
Kentucky 10	John W. Langley	Republican	1906	Incumbent re-elected.	▌ ✓ John W. Langley (Republican) 52.0%; ▌ Amos Davis (Democratic) 48.0%
Kentucky 11	Don C. Edwards	Republican	1904	Incumbent re-elected.	▌ ✓ Don C. Edwards (Republican) 69.8%; ▌ A. G. Patterson (Democratic) 28.5%; ▌ Tobias Huffaker (Prohibition) 1.0%; ▌ E. B. Slatton (Socialist) 0.7%

== Louisiana ==
District	Incumbent			This race	
District	Member	Party	First elected	Results	Candidates
Louisiana 1	Adolph Meyer	Democratic	1890	Incumbent died. Winner also elected to finish term. Democratic hold.	▌ ✓ Albert Estopinal (Democratic) 87.9%; ▌ Henry C. Warmoth (Republican) 12.1%
Louisiana 2	Robert C. Davey	Democratic	1896	Incumbent re-elected but died before next term began.	▌ ✓ Robert C. Davey (Democratic) 95.7%
Louisiana 3	Robert F. Broussard	Democratic	1896	Incumbent re-elected.	▌ ✓ Robert F. Broussard (Democratic) 75.9%; ▌ Charlton Beattie (Republican) 22.0%; ▌ Justus Bateman (Socialist) 2.1%
Louisiana 4	John T. Watkins	Democratic	1904	Incumbent re-elected.	▌ ✓ John T. Watkins (Democratic) 88.2%; ▌ W. S. Emmons (Socialist) 6.3%; ▌ John F. Slattery (Republican) 5.5%
Louisiana 5	Joseph E. Ransdell	Democratic	1899	Incumbent re-elected.	▌ ✓ Joseph E. Ransdell (Democratic) 96.5%; ▌ E. C. Holmes (Socialist) 3.5%
Louisiana 6	George K. Favrot	Democratic	1906	Incumbent lost renomination. Democratic hold.	▌ ✓ Robert Charles Wickliffe (Democratic) 91.8%; ▌ George J. Reiley (Republican) 8.2%
Louisiana 7	Arsène Pujo	Democratic	1902	Incumbent re-elected.	▌ ✓ Arsène Pujo (Democratic) 93.4%; ▌ Alex Hymes (Socialist) 6.6%

== Maine ==
District	Incumbent			This race	
District	Member	Party	First elected	Results	Candidates
Maine 1	Amos L. Allen	Republican	1899	Incumbent re-elected.	▌ ✓ Amos L. Allen (Republican) 53.5%; ▌ John C. Scates (Democratic) 44.2%; ▌ Alphonso N. Witham (Prohibition) 1.2%; ▌ Joseph Lafontaine (Socialist) 1.1%
Maine 2	Charles E. Littlefield	Republican	1899	Incumbent resigned. Winner also elected to finish term. Republican hold.	▌ ✓ John P. Swasey (Republican) 50.7%; ▌ Daniel J. McGillicuddy (Democratic) 46.9%; ▌ George A. England (Socialist) 1.4%; ▌ Arthur J. Dunton (Prohibition) 1.0%
Maine 3	Edwin C. Burleigh	Republican	1897	Incumbent re-elected.	▌ ✓ Edwin C. Burleigh (Republican) 53.1%; ▌ Samuel Wadsworth Gould (Democratic) 45.3%; ▌ Robert G. Henderson (Socialist) 1.0%; ▌ William I. Sterling (Prohibition) 0.6%
Maine 4	Llewellyn Powers	Republican	1901	Incumbent died. Winner also elected to finish term. Republican hold.	▌ ✓ Frank E. Guernsey (Republican) 54.1%; ▌ George M. Hanson (Democratic) 44.4%; ▌ William A. Rideout (Prohibition) 1.0%; ▌ Donald W. Ross (Socialist) 0.5%

== Maryland ==
District	Incumbent			This race	
District	Member	Party	First elected	Results	Candidates
Maryland 1	William H. Jackson	Republican	1906	Incumbent lost re-election. Democratic gain.	▌ ✓ James Harry Covington (Democratic) 52.7%; ▌William H. Jackson (Republican) 45.0%; ▌Jacob W. Wheatley (Prohibition) 3.7%
Maryland 2	J. Frederick C. Talbott	Democratic	1902	Incumbent re-elected.	▌ ✓ J. Frederick C. Talbott (Democratic) 52.2%; ▌Robert Garrett (Republican) 46.1%; ▌John H. Grill (Prohibition) 1.7%
Maryland 3	Harry B. Wolf	Democratic	1906	Incumbent lost re-election. Republican gain.	▌ ✓ John Kronmiller (Republican) 49.1%; ▌Harry B. Wolf (Democratic) 48.2%; ▌Joseph P. Jarboe (Socialist) 1.8%; ▌Roswell V. Whitehurst (Prohibition) 0.9%
Maryland 4	John Gill Jr.	Democratic	1904	Incumbent re-elected.	▌ ✓ John Gill Jr. (Democratic) 52.1%; ▌John Philip Hill (Republican) 46.7%; ▌Charles R. Woods (Prohibition) 1.3%
Maryland 5	Sydney E. Mudd I	Republican	1896	Incumbent re-elected.	▌ ✓ Sydney E. Mudd I (Republican) 49.2%; ▌George M. Smith (Democratic) 48.2%; ▌Samuel W. James (Prohibition) 1.7%; ▌Benjamin E. Davis (Socialist) 1.0%
Maryland 6	George A. Pearre	Republican	1898	Incumbent re-elected.	▌ ✓ George A. Pearre (Republican) 49.1%; ▌David John Lewis (Democratic) 47.6%; ▌H. N. Cuppett (Prohibition) 2.1%; ▌S. L. V. Young (Socialist) 1.2%

== Massachusetts ==
District	Incumbent			This race	
District	Member	Party	First elected	Results	Candidates
Massachusetts 1	George P. Lawrence	Republican	1897 (special)	Incumbent re-elected.	▌ ✓ George P. Lawrence (Republican) 60.2%; ▌David T. Clark (Democratic) 36.40%; ▌Walter S. Hutchins (Socialist) 3.8%
Massachusetts 2	Frederick H. Gillett	Republican	1892	Incumbent re-elected.	▌ ✓ Frederick H. Gillett (Republican) 62.0%; ▌John L. Rice (Democratic) 27.7%; ▌George W. Curtis (Independence) 5.8%; ▌Joseph Orr (Socialist) 4.5%
Massachusetts 3	Charles G. Washburn	Republican	1906 (special)	Incumbent re-elected.	▌ ✓ Charles G. Washburn (Republican) 62.2%; ▌William I. McLoughlin (Democratic) 32.8%; ▌Theodore P. Sturtevant (Independence) 4.9%
Massachusetts 4	Charles Q. Tirrell	Republican	1900	Incumbent re-elected.	▌ ✓ Charles Q. Tirrell (Republican) 55.0%; ▌John Joseph Mitchell (Democratic) 45.0%
Massachusetts 5	Butler Ames	Republican	1902	Incumbent re-elected.	▌ ✓ Butler Ames (Republican) 56.0%; ▌Joseph J. Flynn (Democratic) 41.1%; ▌George Conley (Independence) 2.9%
Massachusetts 6	Augustus P. Gardner	Republican	1902 (special)	Incumbent re-elected.	▌ ✓ Augustus P. Gardner (Republican) 69.4%; ▌Arthur Withington (Democratic) 23.0%; ▌Franklin H. Wenworth (Socialist) 7.6%
Massachusetts 7	Ernest W. Roberts	Republican	1898	Incumbent re-elected.	▌ ✓ Ernest W. Roberts (Republican) 68.8%; ▌George Brickett (Democratic) 24.7%; ▌Clarence L. McIver (Independence) 6.5%
Massachusetts 8	Samuel W. McCall	Republican	1892	Incumbent re-elected.	▌ ✓ Samuel W. McCall (Republican) 63.6%; ▌ Frederick Simpson Deitrick (Democratic) 32.0%; ▌George W. Jennings (Independence) 4.4%
Massachusetts 9	John A. Keliher	Democratic	1902	Incumbent re-elected.	▌ ✓ John A. Keliher (Democratic) 62.3%; ▌John A. Campbell (Republican) 26.6%; ▌Junius T. Auerback (Independence) 11.1%
Massachusetts 10	Joseph F. O'Connell	Democratic	1906	Incumbent re-elected.	▌ ✓ Joseph F. O'Connell (Democratic) 46.40%; ▌J. Mitchel Galvin (Republican) 46.39%; ▌Hazard Stevens (Free Trader) 3.9%; ▌Charles J. Kidney (Independence) 3.3%
Massachusetts 11	Andrew James Peters	Democratic	1906	Incumbent re-elected.	▌ ✓ Andrew James Peters (Democratic) 48.7%; ▌Daniel W. Lane (Republican) 47.4%; ▌Edwin M. White (Independence) 3.9%
Massachusetts 12	John W. Weeks	Republican	1904	Incumbent re-elected.	▌ ✓ John W. Weeks (Republican) 66.0%; ▌Jesse C. Ivey (Democratic) 28.4%; ▌Albert E. George (Independence) 5.6%
Massachusetts 13	William S. Greene	Republican	1898 (special)	Incumbent re-elected.	▌ ✓ William S. Greene (Republican) 72.5%; ▌John F. McGuinness (Democratic) 21.4%; ▌Charles W. Copeland (Independence) 6.2%
Massachusetts 14	William C. Lovering	Republican	1896	Incumbent re-elected.	▌ ✓ William C. Lovering (Republican) 66.8%; ▌Eliot Packard (Democratic) 21.4%; ▌Charles B. Drew (Independence) 5.9%; ▌George J. Alcott (Socialist) 5.9%

== Michigan ==
District	Incumbent			This race	
District	Member	Party	First elected	Results	Candidates
Michigan 1	Edwin Denby	Republican	1904	Incumbent re-elected.	▌ ✓ Edwin Denby (Republican) 56.4%; ▌ William D. Mahon (Democratic) 39.9%; ▌ Ora I. Richardson (Socialist) 2.1%; ▌ William H. Venn (Prohibition) 1.4%; ▌ Israel J. Richardson (Socialist Labor) 0.2%
Michigan 2	Charles E. Townsend	Republican	1902	Incumbent re-elected.	▌ ✓ Charles E. Townsend (Republican) 58.0%; ▌ James C. Henderson (Democratic) 39.4%; ▌ William O. Albig (Prohibition) 2.6%
Michigan 3	Washington Gardner	Republican	1898	Incumbent re-elected.	▌ ✓ Washington Gardner (Republican) 53.7%; ▌ Hiram C. Blackman (Democratic) 42.1%; ▌ Leroy Waterman (Prohibition) 3.3%; ▌ Charles A. Johnson (Socialist) 0.9%
Michigan 4	Edward L. Hamilton	Republican	1896	Incumbent re-elected.	▌ ✓ Edward L. Hamilton (Republican) 59.4%; ▌ Charles H. Kimmerle (Democratic) 36.7%; ▌ John L. Stevens (Prohibition) 2.3%; ▌ Otis M. Southworth (Socialist) 1.5%; ▌ H. H. Shively (Independence) 0.1%
Michigan 5	Gerrit J. Diekema	Republican	1907	Incumbent re-elected.	▌ ✓ Gerrit J. Diekema (Republican) 54.1%; ▌ Edwin F. Sweet (Democratic) 42.0%; ▌ Nimrod F. Jenkins (Prohibition) 3.9%
Michigan 6	Samuel W. Smith	Republican	1896	Incumbent re-elected.	▌ ✓ Samuel W. Smith (Republican) 56.8%; ▌ Franklin Dodge (Democratic) 37.8%; ▌ Winfield Scott Sly (Prohibition) 3.8%; ▌ Edward C. Rogers (Socialist) 1.6%
Michigan 7	Henry McMorran	Republican	1902	Incumbent re-elected.	▌ ✓ Henry McMorran (Republican) 59.4%; ▌ William Springer (Democratic) 36.0%; ▌ John Borland (Prohibition) 3.5%; ▌ John T. Gill (Socialist) 1.1%
Michigan 8	Joseph W. Fordney	Republican	1898	Incumbent re-elected.	▌ ✓ Joseph W. Fordney (Republican) 59.7%; ▌ Jenner E. Morse (Democratic) 39.3%; ▌ George L. Seiferlein (Prohibition) 1.0%
Michigan 9	James C. McLaughlin	Republican	1906	Incumbent re-elected.	▌ ✓ James C. McLaughlin (Republican) 72.1%; ▌ Cornelius Gerber (Democratic) 27.9%
Michigan 10	George A. Loud	Republican	1902	Incumbent re-elected.	▌ ✓ George A. Loud (Republican) 64.6%; ▌ Lewis P. Coumans (Democratic) 33.1%; ▌ William Ream (Prohibition) 2.3%
Michigan 11	Archibald B. Darragh	Republican	1900	Incumbent retired. Republican hold.	▌ ✓ Francis H. Dodds (Republican) 70.5%; ▌ Leavitt S. Griswold (Democratic) 29.5%
Michigan 12	H. Olin Young	Republican	1902	Incumbent re-elected.	▌ ✓ H. Olin Young (Republican) 72.2%; ▌ Patrick H. O'Brien (Democratic) 27.8%

== Minnesota ==
District	Incumbent			This race	
District	Member	Party	First elected	Results	Candidates
Minnesota 1	James A. Tawney	Republican	1892	Incumbent re-elected.	▌ ✓ James A. Tawney (Republican) 53.6%; ▌Andrew French (Democratic) 46.4%
Minnesota 2	Winfield Scott Hammond	Democratic	1906	Incumbent re-elected.	▌ ✓ Winfield Scott Hammond (Democratic) 55.7%; ▌James McCleary (Republican) 44.3%
Minnesota 3	Charles Russell Davis	Republican	1894	Incumbent re-elected.	▌ ✓ Charles Russell Davis (Republican) 59.7%; ▌W. H. Leeman (Democratic) 40.3%
Minnesota 4	Frederick Stevens	Republican	1896	Incumbent re-elected.	▌ ✓ Frederick Stevens (Republican) 60.6%; ▌David F. Peebles (Democratic) 34.4%; ▌Ernest W. Woodrich (Public Ownership) 5.0%
Minnesota 5	Frank Nye	Republican	1906	Incumbent re-elected.	▌ ✓ Frank Nye (Republican) 61.7%; ▌Thomas P. Dwyer (Democratic) 33.7%; ▌Charles F. Dight (Public Ownership) 4.6%
Minnesota 6	Charles August Lindbergh	Republican	1906	Incumbent re-elected.	▌ ✓ Charles August Lindbergh (Republican) 63.1%; ▌Andrew J. Gilkinson (Democratic) 36.9%
Minnesota 7	Andrew Volstead	Republican	1902	Incumbent re-elected.	▌ ✓ Andrew Volstead (Republican) 100%
Minnesota 8	J. Adam Bede	Republican	1902	Incumbent lost renomination. Republican hold.	▌ ✓ Clarence B. Miller (Republican) 81.6%; ▌Alexander Halliday (Public Ownership) 18.4%
Minnesota 9	Halvor Steenerson	Republican	1902	Incumbent re-elected.	▌ ✓ Halvor Steenerson (Republican) 50.9%; ▌Ole O. Sageng (Ind. Populist) 41.8%; ▌Thorsten T. Braaten (Public Ownership) 8.3%

== Mississippi ==
District	Incumbent			This race	
District	Member	Party	First elected	Results	Candidates
Mississippi 1	Ezekiel S. Candler Jr.	Democratic	1900	Incumbent re-elected.	▌ ✓ Ezekiel S. Candler Jr. (Democratic) 100%
Mississippi 2	Thomas Spight	Democratic	1898 (special)	Incumbent re-elected.	▌ ✓ Thomas Spight (Democratic) 100%
Mississippi 3	Benjamin G. Humphreys II	Democratic	1902	Incumbent re-elected.	▌ ✓ Benjamin G. Humphreys II (Democratic) 100%
Mississippi 4	Wilson S. Hill	Democratic	1902	Incumbent lost renomination. Democratic hold.	▌ ✓ Thomas U. Sisson (Democratic) 100%
Mississippi 5	Adam M. Byrd	Democratic	1902	Incumbent re-elected.	▌ ✓ Adam M. Byrd (Democratic) 100%
Mississippi 6	Eaton J. Bowers	Democratic	1902	Incumbent re-elected.	▌ ✓ Eaton J. Bowers (Democratic) 100%
Mississippi 7	Frank A. McLain	Democratic	1898 (special)	Incumbent retired. Democratic hold.	▌ ✓ William A. Dickson (Democratic) 94.66%; ▌H. C. Turley (Republican) 5.34%
Mississippi 8	John S. Williams	Democratic	1892	Incumbent retired to run for U.S. senator. Democratic hold.	▌ ✓ James Collier (Democratic) 100%

== Missouri ==
District	Incumbent			This race	
District	Member	Party	First elected	Results	Candidates
Missouri 1	James T. Lloyd	Democratic	1897	Incumbent re-elected.	▌ ✓ James T. Lloyd (Democratic) 52.4%; ▌ W. F. Chamberlain (Republican) 45.2%; ▌ C. F. Conley (Socialist) 1.7%; ▌ T.N. Jenkins (Prohibition) 0.5%
Missouri 2	William W. Rucker	Democratic	1898	Incumbent re-elected.	▌ ✓ William W. Rucker (Democratic) 55.6%; ▌ Edward F. Haley (Republican) 43.6%; ▌ B. McAllister (Socialist) 0.5%; ▌ J. H. Brownfield (Populist) 0.3%
Missouri 3	Joshua W. Alexander	Democratic	1906	Incumbent re-elected.	▌ ✓ Joshua W. Alexander (Democratic) 52.6%; ▌ Henry L. Eads (Republican) 47.3%
Missouri 4	Charles F. Booher	Democratic	1906	Incumbent re-elected.	▌ ✓ Charles F. Booher (Democratic) 53.1%; ▌ Morris A. Reed (Republican) 46.4%; ▌ E. D. Wilcox (Socialist) 0.5%
Missouri 5	Edgar C. Ellis	Republican	1904	Incumbent lost re-election. Democratic gain.	▌ ✓ William P. Borland (Democratic) 52.7%; ▌ Edgar C. Ellis (Republican) 45.5%; ▌ Lucius Knowles (Socialist) 1.4%; ▌ L.G. Copley (Prohibition) 0.4%
Missouri 6	David A. De Armond	Democratic	1890	Incumbent re-elected.	▌ ✓ David A. De Armond (Democratic) 52.7%; ▌ William O. Atkeson (Republican) 46.6%; ▌ John B. Mayfield (Prohibition) 0.7%
Missouri 7	Courtney W. Hamlin	Democratic	1906	Incumbent re-elected.	▌ ✓ Courtney W. Hamlin (Democratic) 49.8%; ▌ John Whitaker (Republican) 48.2%; ▌ E. T. Behrens (Socialist) 1.5%; ▌ Edwin E. McClellan (Prohibition) 0.5%
Missouri 8	Dorsey W. Shackleford	Democratic	1899	Incumbent re-elected.	▌ ✓ Dorsey W. Shackleford (Democratic) 52.3%; ▌ W. C. Irwin (Republican) 47.7%
Missouri 9	Champ Clark	Democratic	1896	Incumbent re-elected.	▌ ✓ Champ Clark (Democratic) 51.6%; ▌ Reuben F. Roy (Republican) 48.4%
Missouri 10	Richard Bartholdt	Republican	1892	Incumbent re-elected.	▌ ✓ Richard Bartholdt (Republican) 60.4%; ▌ Frank A. Thompson (Democratic) 35.2%; ▌ G. A. Hoehen (Socialist) 4.4%
Missouri 11	Henry S. Caulfield	Republican	1906	Incumbent retired. Democratic gain.	▌ ✓ Patrick F. Gill (Democratic) 50.9%; ▌ William T. Findly (Republican) 46.5%; ▌ Philip H. Mueller (Socialist) 2.6%
Missouri 12	Harry M. Coudrey	Republican	1904	Incumbent re-elected.	▌ ✓ Harry M. Coudrey (Republican) 49.7%; ▌ Colin M. Selph (Democratic) 48.1%; ▌ [FNU] Crouch (Socialist) 2.2%
Missouri 13	Madison R. Smith	Democratic	1906	Incumbent lost re-election. Republican gain.	▌ ✓ Politte Elvins (Republican) 50.3%; ▌ Madison R. Smith (Democratic) 49.7%
Missouri 14	Joseph J. Russell	Democratic	1906	Incumbent lost re-election. Republican gain.	▌ ✓ Charles A. Crow (Republican) 48.3%; ▌ Joseph J. Russell (Democratic) 46.8%; ▌ Morris B. Wilkerson (Socialist) 4.4%; ▌ T. N. Jenkins (Prohibition) 0.5%
Missouri 15	Thomas Hackney	Democratic	1906	Incumbent lost re-election. Republican gain.	▌ ✓ Charles H. Morgan (Republican) 47.9%; ▌ Thomas Hackney (Democratic) 46.6%; ▌ Claude Berry (Socialist) 4.4%; ▌ W. Peters (Prohibition) 1.1%
Missouri 16	J. Robert Lamar	Democratic	1906	Incumbent lost re-election. Republican gain.	▌ ✓ Arthur P. Murphy (Republican) 50.8%; ▌ J. Robert Lamar (Democratic) 49.2%

== Montana ==
District	Incumbent			This race	
District	Member	Party	First elected	Results	Candidates
Montana at-large	Charles N. Pray	Republican	1906	Incumbent re-elected.	▌ ✓ Charles N. Pray (Republican) 48.86%; ▌Thomas D. Long (Democratic) 43.22%; ▌Lewis J. Duncan (Socialist) 7.92%

== Nebraska ==
District	Incumbent			This race	
District	Member	Party	First elected	Results	Candidates
Nebraska 1	Ernest M. Pollard	Republican	1905 (special)	Incumbent lost re-election. Democratic gain.	▌ ✓ John A. Maguire (Democratic/Populist) 51.22%; ▌Ernest M. Pollard (Republican) 48.78%
Nebraska 2	Gilbert Hitchcock	Democratic	1906	Incumbent re-elected.	▌ ✓ Gilbert Hitchcock (Democratic) 52.60%; ▌Albert W. Jefferis (Republican) 45.39%; ▌G. C. Porter (Socialist) 2.02%
Nebraska 3	John F. Boyd	Republican	1906	Incumbent lost re-election. Democratic gain.	▌ ✓ James P. Latta (Democratic/Populist) 51.63%; ▌John F. Boyd (Republican) 47.84%; ▌James M. Woodcock (Socialist) 0.53%
Nebraska 4	Edmund H. Hinshaw	Republican	1902	Incumbent re-elected.	▌ ✓ Edmund H. Hinshaw (Republican) 49.98%; ▌Charles F. Gilbert (Democratic/Populist) 48.10%; ▌Thomas Birmingham (Prohibition) 1.92%
Nebraska 5	George W. Norris	Republican	1902	Incumbent re-elected.	▌ ✓ George W. Norris (Republican) 49.41%; ▌F. W. Ashton (Democratic/Populist) 49.36%; ▌J. J. Larkey (Socialist) 1.23%
Nebraska 6	Moses Kinkaid	Republican	1902	Incumbent re-elected.	▌ ✓ Moses Kinkaid (Republican) 50.67%; ▌W. H. Westover (Democratic/Populist) 45.82%; ▌Lucien Stebbins (Socialist) 1.95%; ▌G. H. Hornby (Prohibition) 1.55%

== Nevada ==
District	Incumbent			This race	
District	Member	Party	First elected	Results	Candidates
Nevada at-large	George A. Bartlett	Democratic	1906	Incumbent re-elected.	▌ ✓ George A. Bartlett (Democratic) 47.3%; ▌ H. B. Maxson (Republican) 31.7%; ▌ Adolphus L. Fitzgerald (Independent) 12.7%; ▌ H. T. Jardine (Socialist) 8.3%

== New Hampshire ==
District	Incumbent			This race	
District	Member	Party	First elected	Results	Candidates
New Hampshire 1	Cyrus A. Sulloway	Republican	1894	Incumbent re-elected.	▌ ✓ Cyrus A. Sulloway (Republican) 56.9%; ▌ Michael J. White (Democratic) 40.5%; ▌ Alva H. Morrill (Prohibition) 1.0%; ▌ George A. Little (Socialist) 0.9%; ▌ Jared A. Green (Independence) 0.7%
New Hampshire 2	Frank D. Currier	Republican	1900	Incumbent re-elected.	▌ ✓ Frank D. Currier (Republican) 59.3%; ▌ Frederick Myron Colby (Democratic) 38.0%; ▌ William H. McFall (Socialist) 1.5%; ▌ Samuel T. Noyes (Prohibition) 0.8%; ▌ Alfred R. Browne (Independence) 0.4%

== New Jersey ==
District	Incumbent			This race	
District	Member	Party	First elected	Results	Candidates
New Jersey 1	Henry C. Loudenslager	Republican	1892	Incumbent re-elected.	▌ ✓ Henry C. Loudenslager (Republican) 58.4%; ▌ Edward Everett Grosscup (Democratic) 37.5%; ▌ Charles C. Read (Prohibition) 2.4%; ▌ John D. Henderson (Socialist) 1.7%
New Jersey 2	John J. Gardner	Republican	1892	Incumbent re-elected.	▌ ✓ John J. Gardner (Republican) 52.2%; ▌ Edward Burd Grubb Jr. (Democratic) 44.8%; ▌ James E. Steelman (Prohibition) 2.2%; ▌ John B. Leeds (Socialist) 0.8%
New Jersey 3	Benjamin F. Howell	Republican	1894	Incumbent re-elected.	▌ ✓ Benjamin F. Howell (Republican) 56.6%; ▌ Edward Clark (Democratic) 42.5%; ▌ T. J. Scott (Prohibition) 0.9%
New Jersey 4	Ira W. Wood	Republican	1904	Incumbent re-elected.	▌ ✓ Ira W. Wood (Republican) 56.5%; ▌ William V. Steele (Democratic) 40.7%; ▌ Thomas B. Dennis (Socialist) 1.7%; ▌ Ross Slack (Prohibition) 1.1%
New Jersey 5	Charles N. Fowler	Republican	1894	Incumbent re-elected.	▌ ✓ Charles N. Fowler (Republican) 55.5%; ▌ Isaac Barber (Democratic) 40.7%; ▌ Bordeaux Wilson Stokes (Socialist) 2.6%; ▌ Joel G. Van Cise (Prohibition) 1.2%
New Jersey 6	William Hughes	Democratic	1906	Incumbent re-elected.	▌ ✓ William Hughes (Democratic) 49.5%; ▌ Thomas Foxhall (Republican) 46.9%; ▌ Frederick Krafft (Socialist) 2.3%; ▌ James G. Patton (Prohibition) 0.9%; ▌ Rudolph Katz (Socialist Labor) 0.4%
New Jersey 7	Richard W. Parker	Republican	1894	Incumbent re-elected.	▌ ✓ Richard W. Parker (Republican) 56.6%; ▌ Edward W. Townsend (Democratic) 41.2%; ▌ Charles Murphy (Socialist) 1.6%; ▌ John R. Anderson (Prohibition) 0.4%; ▌ Adolph J. Corlin (Socialist Labor) 0.2%
New Jersey 8	Le Gage Pratt	Democratic	1906	Incumbent lost re-election. Republican gain.	▌ ✓ William H. Wiley (Republican) 57.9%; ▌ Le Gage Pratt (Democratic) 38.4%; ▌ Robert S. Sherwin (Socialist) 3.2%; ▌ Robert Burnet (Prohibition) 0.3%; ▌ Herman Hartung (Socialist Labor) 0.2%
New Jersey 9	Eugene W. Leake	Democratic	1906	Incumbent retired. Democratic hold.	▌ ✓ Eugene F. Kinkead (Democratic) 54.5%; ▌ [FNU] Critchfield (Republican) 43.2%; ▌ J. M. Reilly (Socialist) 2.0%; ▌ Everett Gray (Prohibition) 0.2%; ▌ [FNU] Heimbeg (Socialist Labor) 0.1%
New Jersey 10	James A. Hamill	Democratic	1906	Incumbent re-elected.	▌ ✓ James A. Hamill (Democratic) 57.7%; ▌ D. F. Dwyer (Republican) 39.0%; ▌ Charles Ufert (Socialist) 3.3%

== New Mexico Territory ==
See Non-voting delegates, below.

== New York ==
District	Incumbent			This race	
District	Member	Party	First elected	Results	Candidates
New York 1	William W. Cocks	Republican	1904	Incumbent re-elected.	▌ ✓ William W. Cocks (Republican) 56.6%; ▌ Monson Morris (Democratic) 37.5%; ▌ Cassius K. Michael (Independence League) 3.6%; ▌ John A. Burgher (Socialist) 1.3%; ▌ William A. Simons (Prohibition) 1.0%
New York 2	George H. Lindsay	Democratic	1900	Incumbent re-elected.	▌ ✓ George H. Lindsay (Democratic) 53.9%; ▌ William Liebermann (Republican) 34.9%; ▌ Edward Walsh (Independence League) 6.6%; ▌ Konrad Loske (Socialist) 4.4%; ▌ Charles A. Fickerson (Prohibition) 0.2%
New York 3	Charles T. Dunwell	Republican	1902	Incumbent died. Winner also elected to finish term. Republican hold.	▌ ✓ Otto G. Foelker (Republican) 50.3%; ▌ James P. Maher (Democratic) 41.6%; ▌ John T. Hill (Socialist) 4.1%; ▌ Harry Colton (Independence League) 3.9%; ▌ Preston E. Terry (Prohibition) 0.1%
New York 4	Charles B. Law	Republican	1904	Incumbent re-elected.	▌ ✓ Charles B. Law (Republican) 49.7%; ▌ Edward R. Gilman (Democratic) 39.2%; ▌ Otto Wegener (Socialist) 5.6%; ▌ Arthur S. Colborne (Independence League) 5.3%; ▌ John C. Allen (Prohibition) 0.2%
New York 5	George E. Waldo	Republican	1904	Incumbent retired. Republican hold.	▌ ✓ Richard Young (Republican) 54.2%; ▌ J. Harry Snook (Democratic) 38.4%; ▌ Edmund O'Connor (Independence League) 4.6%; ▌ Henry J. Heuer (Socialist) 2.5%; ▌ Edward R. Keeler (Prohibition) 0.3%
New York 6	William M. Calder	Republican	1904	Incumbent re-elected.	▌ ✓ William M. Calder (Republican) 55.4%; ▌ John E. Eastmond (Democratic) 40.0%; ▌ John F. Kinney (Independence League) 3.0%; ▌ Thomas A. Hopkins (Socialist) 1.4%; ▌ William Dixon (Prohibition) 0.2%
New York 7	John J. Fitzgerald	Democratic	1898	Incumbent re-elected.	▌ ✓ John J. Fitzgerald (Democratic) 58.5%; ▌ William R. Koehl (Republican) 33.9%; ▌ William T. Smith (Independence League) 6.1%; ▌ Gus Petrit (Socialist) 1.3%; ▌ Lewis C. Brown (Prohibition) 0.2%
New York 8	Daniel J. Riordan	Democratic	1906	Incumbent re-elected.	▌ ✓ Daniel J. Riordan (Democratic) 62.5%; ▌ James Winterbottom (Republican) 32.2%; ▌ Franklin Quinby (Independence League) 3.3%; ▌ John H. Nagel (Socialist) 1.6%; ▌ Henry W. Doremus (Prohibition) 0.4%
New York 9	Henry M. Goldfogle	Democratic	1900	Incumbent re-elected.	▌ ✓ Henry M. Goldfogle (Democratic) 53.8%; ▌ Morris Hillquit (Socialist) 21.6%; ▌ Louis I. Cherey (Republican) 20.1%; ▌ Morris Salem (Independence League) 2.8%; ▌ Daniel De Leon (Socialist Labor) 1.3%; ▌ Viggio Rugaard (Prohibition) 0.4%
New York 10	William Sulzer	Democratic	1894	Incumbent re-elected.	▌ ✓ William Sulzer (Democratic) 54.4%; ▌ Gustave Hartman (Republican) 33.4%; ▌ Morris Brown (Socialist) 9.0%; ▌ John T. Martin (Independence League) 3.1%; ▌ William H. Draper (Prohibition) 0.1%; ▌ Jacob Carroll (Socialist Labor) 0.1%
New York 11	Charles V. Fornes	Democratic	1906	Incumbent re-elected.	▌ ✓ Charles V. Fornes (Democratic) 58.9%; ▌ Laurence La T. Driggs (Republican) 33.4%; ▌ Alexander Porter (Independence League) 5.3%; ▌ Alexander F. Irvine (Socialist) 2.2%; ▌ Robert E. Neidig (Prohibition) 0.2%
New York 12	William Bourke Cockran	Democratic	1904	Incumbent retired. Democratic hold.	▌ ✓ Michael F. Conry (Democratic) 60.9%; ▌ Victor H. Duras (Republican) 29.4%; ▌ James D. Bush (Independence League) 5.4%; ▌ Fred Paulitsch (Socialist) 4.0%; ▌ Eben P. Jones (Socialist Labor) 0.2%; ▌ August W. Pfluger (Prohibition) 0.1%
New York 13	Herbert Parsons	Republican	1904	Incumbent re-elected.	▌ ✓ Herbert Parsons (Republican) 51.4%; ▌ Gerald H. Gray (Democratic) 42.2%; ▌ John E. Olson (Independence League) 3.0%; ▌ Frank Henderick (Independent) 1.7%; ▌ Harry J. Newman (Socialist) 1.5%; ▌ William H. Wills (Prohibition) 0.3%
New York 14	William Willett Jr.	Democratic	1906	Incumbent re-elected.	▌ ✓ William Willett Jr. (Democratic) 52.2%; ▌ Emanuel Castka (Republican) 34.2%; ▌ Philip H. Schmitt (Socialist) 7.4%; ▌ Herbert Wade (Independence League) 6.0%; ▌ Joseph H. Ralph (Prohibition) 0.2%
New York 15	J. Van Vechten Olcott	Republican	1904	Incumbent re-elected.	▌ ✓ J. Van Vechten Olcott (Republican) 56.5%; ▌ Rhinelander Waldo (Democratic) 41.8%; ▌ Charles Dougherty (Independence League) 1.5%; ▌ Henry W. Livingston (Prohibition) 0.2%
New York 16	Francis Burton Harrison	Democratic	1906	Incumbent re-elected.	▌ ✓ Francis Burton Harrison (Democratic) 50.8%; ▌ Francis A. Adams (Republican) 35.7%; ▌ John Parr (Socialist) 8.0%; ▌ Edwin D. Ackerman (Independence League) 5.4%; ▌ George Munro (Prohibition) 0.1%
New York 17	William Stiles Bennet	Republican	1904	Incumbent re-elected.	▌ ✓ William Stiles Bennet (Republican) 53.5%; ▌ William Gibbs McAdoo (Democratic) 40.4%; ▌ Jay C. Walton (Independence League) 3.4%; ▌ John Wilkens (Socialist) 2.5%; ▌ Richard Maddern (Prohibition) 0.2%
New York 18	Joseph A. Goulden	Democratic	1902	Incumbent re-elected.	▌ ✓ Joseph A. Goulden (Democratic) 51.5%; ▌ Joel Elias Spingarn (Republican) 37.1%; ▌ Frank McGarry (Independence League) 6.0%; ▌ George B. Staring (Socialist) 5.3%; ▌ John Davidson (Prohibition) 0.2%
New York 19	John Emory Andrus	Republican	1904	Incumbent re-elected.	▌ ✓ John Emory Andrus (Republican) 55.6%; ▌ William H. Lynn (Democratic) 39.4%; ▌ John J. Cleary (Independence League) 2.4%; ▌ Leon A. Malkiel (Socialist) 1.8%; ▌ Stephen W. Collins (Prohibition) 0.8%
New York 20	Thomas W. Bradley	Republican	1902	Incumbent re-elected.	▌ ✓ Thomas W. Bradley (Republican) 55.9%; ▌ Richard E. King (Democratic) 42.0%; ▌ Schuyler C. Pew (Prohibition) 1.4%; ▌ Ernest Harrison (Independence League) 0.7%
New York 21	Samuel McMillan	Republican	1906	Incumbent retired. Republican hold.	▌ ✓ Hamilton Fish II (Republican) 52.0%; ▌ Andrew C. Zabriskie (Democratic) 44.9%; ▌ William W. Smith (Prohibition) 1.8%; ▌ George Lazar (Independence League) 1.0%; ▌ George H. Warner (Socialist) 0.3%
New York 22	William H. Draper	Republican	1900	Incumbent re-elected.	▌ ✓ William H. Draper (Republican) 52.7%; ▌ Winfield A. Huppuch (Democratic) 43.7%; ▌ Leroy C. Lane (Independence League) 1.5%; ▌ Edwin Bell (Prohibition) 1.4%; ▌ William Nugent (Socialist) 0.7%
New York 23	George N. Southwick	Republican	1900	Incumbent re-elected.	▌ ✓ George N. Southwick (Republican) 48.5%; ▌ William H. Keeler (Democratic) 47.6%; ▌ Herbert M. Merrill (Socialist) 1.9%; ▌ George C. Hisgen (Independence League) 1.2%; ▌ Harry S. Weeks (Prohibition) 0.8%
New York 24	George Winthrop Fairchild	Republican	1906	Incumbent re-elected.	▌ ✓ George Winthrop Fairchild (Republican) 53.8%; ▌ G. Hyde Clark (Democratic) 43.5%; ▌ George W. Ostrander (Independence League) 2.7%
New York 25	Cyrus Durey	Republican	1906	Incumbent re-elected.	▌ ✓ Cyrus Durey (Republican) 54.4%; ▌ Joseph D. Baucus (Democratic) 39.9%; ▌ Charles E. Robbins (Prohibition) 2.8%; ▌ Waldemar W. Rohde (Socialist) 1.7%; ▌ William B. Murphy (Independence League) 1.2%
New York 26	George R. Malby	Republican	1906	Incumbent re-elected.	▌ ✓ George R. Malby (Republican) 66.4%; ▌ Ellis Woodworth (Democratic) 32.3%; ▌ John P. Judge (Independence League) 0.9%; ▌ Frederick G. Thomas (Socialist) 0.4%
New York 27	James S. Sherman	Republican	1892	Incumbent retired to become Vice President of the United States. Republican hold.	▌ ✓ Charles S. Millington (Republican) 54.0%; ▌ Curtis F. Alliaume (Democratic) 42.8%; ▌ Daniel H. Conrad (Prohibition) 1.7%; ▌ Arthur L. Byron-Curtiss (Socialist) 0.8%; ▌ William J. Hoffman (Independence League) 0.7%
New York 28	Charles L. Knapp	Republican	1900	Incumbent re-elected.	▌ ✓ Charles L. Knapp (Republican) 57.9%; ▌ Andrew C. Cornwall (Democratic) 35.1%; ▌ Sylvanus V. Barker (Prohibition) 5.3%; ▌ Thomas H. Lynch (Socialist) 1.2%; ▌ A. C. Moore (Independence League) 0.5%
New York 29	Michael E. Driscoll	Republican	1898	Incumbent re-elected.	▌ ✓ Michael E. Driscoll (Republican) 59.1%; ▌ Alphonso E. Fitch (Democratic) 36.0%; ▌ Frank Smith (Independence League) 2.7%; ▌ Charles M. Tower (Socialist) 2.2%
New York 30	John W. Dwight	Republican	1902	Incumbent re-elected.	▌ ✓ John W. Dwight (Republican) 57.4%; ▌ Alexander D. Wales (Democratic) 37.2%; ▌ Dell June (Prohibition) 4.4%; ▌ George W. Beach (Socialist) 0.6%; ▌ Murray E. Poole (Independence League) 0.4%
New York 31	Sereno E. Payne	Republican	1889	Incumbent re-elected.	▌ ✓ Sereno E. Payne (Republican) 59.7%; ▌ John A. Curtis (Democratic) 36.8%; ▌ Lee Roy Carl (Socialist) 2.0%; ▌ George S. Ellis (Independence League) 1.5%
New York 32	James Breck Perkins	Republican	1900	Incumbent re-elected.	▌ ✓ James Breck Perkins (Republican) 56.4%; ▌ Herman S. Searle (Democratic) 39.0%; ▌ Charles L. Swaim (Socialist) 2.6%; ▌ William W. Kenfield (Prohibition) 1.2%; ▌ William Cox (Independence League) 0.8%
New York 33	Jacob Sloat Fassett	Republican	1904	Incumbent re-elected.	▌ ✓ Jacob Sloat Fassett (Republican) 52.2%; ▌ James A. Parsons (Democratic) 43.1%; ▌ Samuel Mitchell (Prohibition) 3.0%; ▌ Emmett D. Hees (Independence League) 0.9%; ▌ Hawley S. Pettibone (Socialist) 0.8%
New York 34	Peter A. Porter	Independent Republican	1906	Incumbent retired. Republican gain.	▌ ✓ James S. Simmon (Republican) 54.7%; ▌ Frank W. Brown (Democratic) 42.1%; ▌ J. Llewellyn Davies (Socialist) 2.6%; ▌ George N. Archer (Independence League) 0.6%
New York 35	William H. Ryan	Democratic	1898	Incumbent lost renomination. Democratic hold.	▌ ✓ Daniel A. Driscoll (Democratic) 55.2%; ▌ L. Bradley Dorr (Republican) 42.9%; ▌ Samuel F. Leary (Socialist) 1.4%; ▌ Charles Reinagel (Independence League) 0.3%; ▌ Joseph A. Dixon (Prohibition) 0.2%
New York 36	De Alva S. Alexander	Republican	1896	Incumbent re-elected.	▌ ✓ De Alva S. Alexander (Republican) 58.2%; ▌ William H. Follette (Democratic) 39.5%; ▌ Vancleve C. Mott (Prohibition) 1.0%; ▌ Jonn J. Findlater (Socialist) 1.0%; ▌ Willard C. Price (Independence League) 0.3%
New York 37	Edward B. Vreeland	Republican	1899	Incumbent re-elected.	▌ ✓ Edward B. Vreeland (Republican) 62.4%; ▌ Sanford H. Thome (Democratic) 30.4%; ▌ George C. Rosa (Prohibition) 4.3%; ▌ W. B. Wilson (Socialist) 2.5%; ▌ C. R. Stone (Independence League) 0.4%

== North Carolina ==
District	Incumbent			This race	
District	Member	Party	First elected	Results	Candidates
North Carolina 1	John H. Small	Democratic	1898	Incumbent re-elected.	▌ ✓ John H. Small (Democratic) 71.1%; ▌ Isaac Melson Meekins (Republican) 28.9%
North Carolina 2	Claude Kitchin	Democratic	1900	Incumbent re-elected.	▌ ✓ Claude Kitchin (Democratic) 78.2%; ▌ M. Ferguson (Republican) 21.4%
North Carolina 3	Charles R. Thomas	Democratic	1898	Incumbent re-elected.	▌ ✓ Charles R. Thomas (Democratic) 59.4%; ▌ Eli W. Hill (Republican) 40.6%
North Carolina 4	Edward W. Pou	Democratic	1900	Incumbent re-elected.	▌ ✓ Edward W. Pou (Democratic) 60.0%; ▌ Willis G. Briggs (Republican) 40.0%
North Carolina 5	William Walton Kitchin	Democratic	1896	Incumbent resigned when elected Governor of North Carolina. Republican gain.	▌ ✓ John Motley Morehead II (Republican) 50.1%; ▌ Aubrey L. Brooks (Democratic) 49.2%
North Carolina 6	Hannibal L. Godwin	Democratic	1906	Incumbent re-elected.	▌ ✓ Hannibal L. Godwin (Democratic) 66.3%; ▌ Albert H. Slocumb (Republican) 33.7%
North Carolina 7	Robert N. Page	Democratic	1902	Incumbent re-elected.	▌ ✓ Robert N. Page (Democratic) 56.2%; ▌ Zeb V. Walser (Republican) 43.8%
North Carolina 8	Richard N. Hackett	Democratic	1906	Incumbent lost re-election. Republican gain.	▌ ✓ Charles H. Cowles (Republican) 52.1%; ▌ Richard N. Hackett (Democratic) 47.8%
North Carolina 9	E. Yates Webb	Democratic	1902	Incumbent re-elected.	▌ ✓ E. Yates Webb (Democratic) 55.0%; ▌ John A. Smith (Republican) 45.0%
North Carolina 10	William T. Crawford	Democratic	1906	Incumbent lost re-election. Republican gain.	▌ ✓ John Gaston Grant (Republican) 50.5%; ▌ William T. Crawford (Democratic) 49.3%

== North Dakota ==
District	Incumbent			This race	
District	Member	Party	First elected	Results	Candidates
North Dakota at-large 2 seats on a general ticket	Thomas F. Marshall	Republican	1900	Incumbent retired to run for U.S. senator. Republican hold.	▌ ✓ Asle Gronna (Republican) 33.35%; ▌ ✓ Louis B. Hanna (Republican) 32.34%; ▌Tobias D. Casey (Democratic) 17.11%; ▌O. G. Major (Democratic) 16.54%; ▌Francis Cooper (Socialist) 0.34%; ▌E. D. Herring (Socialist) 0.31%
North Dakota at-large 2 seats on a general ticket	Asle Gronna	Republican	1904	Incumbent re-elected.	▌ ✓ Asle Gronna (Republican) 33.35%; ▌ ✓ Louis B. Hanna (Republican) 32.34%; ▌Tobias D. Casey (Democratic) 17.11%; ▌O. G. Major (Democratic) 16.54%; ▌Francis Cooper (Socialist) 0.34%; ▌E. D. Herring (Socialist) 0.31%

== Ohio ==
District	Incumbent			This race	
District	Member	Party	First elected	Results	Candidates
Ohio 1	Nicholas Longworth	Republican	1902	Incumbent re-elected.	▌ ✓ Nicholas Longworth (Republican) 55.2%; ▌ Thomas P. Hart (Democratic) 42.1%; ▌ Benjamin Robertson (Socialist) 2.3%; ▌ Addison Y. Reid (Prohibition) 0.4%
Ohio 2	Herman P. Goebel	Republican	1902	Incumbent re-elected.	▌ ✓ Herman P. Goebel (Republican) 48.6%; ▌ Charles N. Dannenhower (Democratic) 48.4%; ▌ George Monroe (Socialist) 2.8%; ▌ John Robertson (Prohibition) 0.2%
Ohio 3	J. Eugene Harding	Republican	1906	Incumbent lost renomination and lost re-election as an Independent Republican. Democratic gain.	▌ ✓ James M. Cox (Democratic) 48.1%; ▌ J. Eugene Harding (Ind. Republican) 28.5%; ▌ William G. Frizell (Republican) 18.6%; ▌ Howard H. Caldwell (Socialist) 4.4%; ▌ Henry A. Thompson (Prohibition) 0.4%
Ohio 4	William E. Tou Velle	Democratic	1906	Incumbent re-elected.	▌ ✓ William E. Tou Velle (Democratic) 58.2%; ▌ Thomas J. Mulligan (Republican) 39.6%; ▌ John H. Stedke (Socialist) 1.2%; ▌ James M. Lippincott (Prohibition) 1.0%
Ohio 5	Timothy T. Ansberry	Democratic	1906	Incumbent reelected.	▌ ✓ Timothy T. Ansberry (Democratic) 57.7%; ▌ William Wildman Campbell (Republican) 40.7%; ▌ Owen Donaldson (Socialist) 1.0%; ▌ O. P. Sliecher (Prohibition) 0.6%
Ohio 6	Matthew Denver	Democratic	1906	Incumbent re-elected.	▌ ✓ Matthew Denver (Democratic) 51.6%; ▌ Jesse Taylor (Republican) 48.0%; ▌ B. D. Hypes (Prohibition) 0.4%
Ohio 7	J. Warren Keifer	Republican	1904	Incumbent re-elected.	▌ ✓ J. Warren Keifer (Republican) 51.2%; ▌ O. E. Duff (Democratic) 45.2%; ▌ J. L. Shaffer (Socialist) 2.5%; ▌ W. C. Shuman (Prohibition) 1.1%
Ohio 8	Ralph D. Cole	Republican	1904	Incumbent re-elected.	▌ ✓ Ralph D. Cole (Republican) 50.0%; ▌ William R. Niven (Democratic) 47.5%; ▌ Charles E. Wharton (Socialist) 1.5%; ▌ Simeon McMoran (Prohibition) 1.0%
Ohio 9	Isaac R. Sherwood	Democratic	1906	Incumbent reelected.	▌ ✓ Isaac R. Sherwood (Democratic) 47.8%; ▌ James H. Southard (Republican) 45.1%; ▌ Charles H. Miller (Socialist) 5.4%; ▌ J. T. Braithwaite (Prohibition) 0.6%
Ohio 10	Henry T. Bannon	Republican	1904	Incumbent retired. Republican hold.	▌ ✓ Adna R. Johnson (Republican) 53.8%; ▌ Thomas H. Jones (Democratic) 43.0%; ▌ Robert Dodge (Socialist) 2.2%; ▌ Edward J. Meacham (Prohibition) 1.0%
Ohio 11	Albert Douglas	Republican	1906	Incumbent re-elected.	▌ ✓ Albert Douglas (Republican) 49.9%; ▌ L. A. Sears (Democratic) 47.8%; ▌ Leroy Elswick (Socialist) 1.5%; ▌ Hiram L. Baker (Prohibition) 0.8%
Ohio 12	Edward L. Taylor Jr.	Republican	1904	Incumbent re-elected.	▌ ✓ Edward L. Taylor Jr. (Republican) 54.5%; ▌ Benjamin F. Gayman (Democratic) 42.2%; ▌ Ellis O. Jones (Socialist) 1.9%; ▌ Daniel A. Poling (Prohibition) 1.3%; ▌ John T. Cuppy (Independent) 0.1%
Ohio 13	Grant E. Mouser	Republican	1904	Incumbent lost re-election. Democratic gain.	▌ ✓ Carl C. Anderson (Democratic) 53.2%; ▌ Grant E. Mouser (Republican) 44.7%; ▌ George P. Maxwell (Socialist) 1.6%; ▌ Loren C. Reed (Prohibition) 0.5%
Ohio 14	J. Ford Laning	Republican	1906	Incumbent declined renomination. Democratic gain.	▌ ✓ William G. Sharp (Democratic) 50.0%; ▌ Frank V. Owen (Republican) 47.0%; ▌ George A. Storck (Socialist) 2.1%; ▌ James W. Holton (Prohibition) 0.9%
Ohio 15	Beman Gates Dawes	Republican	1904	Incumbent retired. Republican hold.	▌ ✓ James Joyce (Republican) 48.8%; ▌ George White (Democratic) 48.7%; ▌ J. Knox Montgomery (Prohibition) 1.5%; ▌ William H. Crawford (Socialist) 1.0%
Ohio 16	Capell L. Weems	Republican	1902	Incumbent retired. Republican hold.	▌ ✓ David Hollingsworth (Republican) 51.7%; ▌ N. A. McCombs (Democratic) 44.2%; ▌ Mark Lister (Socialist) 2.6%; ▌ Robert J. Johnson (Prohibition) 1.5%
Ohio 17	William A. Ashbrook	Democratic	1906	Incumbent re-elected.	▌ ✓ William A. Ashbrook (Democratic) 55.3%; ▌ John F. Harrington (Republican) 41.1%; ▌ Horace Whitcomb (Socialist) 2.9%; ▌ J. E. Lersch (Prohibition) 0.7%
Ohio 18	James Kennedy	Republican	1902	Incumbent re-elected.	▌ ✓ James Kennedy (Republican) 48.3%; ▌ John J. Whitacre (Democratic) 43.4%; ▌ Elias Jenkins (Prohibition) 4.5%; ▌ Robert J. Wheeler (Socialist) 3.8%
Ohio 19	W. Aubrey Thomas	Republican	1904	Incumbent re-elected.	▌ ✓ W. Aubrey Thomas (Republican) 55.3%; ▌ Stephen A. Robinson (Democratic) 38.7%; ▌ Frank Goodenberger (Socialist) 4.5%; ▌ William Frost Crispin (Prohibition) 1.5%
Ohio 20	L. Paul Howland	Republican	1906	Incumbent re-elected.	▌ ✓ L. Paul Howland (Republican) 55.9%; ▌ Charles W. Lapp (Democratic) 40.1%; ▌ H. A. Morgan (Socialist) 3.6%; ▌ John H. Dayton (Prohibition) 0.4%
Ohio 21	Theodore E. Burton	Republican	1894	Incumbent re-elected.	▌ ✓ Theodore E. Burton (Republican) 59.3%; ▌ James E. Wertman (Democratic) 36.1%; ▌ Max S. Hayes (Socialist) 4.4%; ▌ John McDonough (Prohibition) 0.2%

== Oklahoma ==
District	Incumbent			This race	
District	Member	Party	First elected	Results	Candidates
Oklahoma 1	Bird S. McGuire	Republican	1907	Incumbent re-elected.	▌ ✓ Bird S. McGuire (Republican) 50.6%; ▌Henry S. Johnston (Democratic) 44.5%; ▌Achilles W. Renshaw (Socialist) 4.8%
Oklahoma 2	Elmer L. Fulton	Democratic	1907	Incumbent lost re-election. Republican gain.	▌ ✓ Dick T. Morgan (Republican) 46.8%; ▌Elmer L. Fulton (Democratic) 45.2%; ▌Charles P. Randall (Socialist) 7.9%
Oklahoma 3	James S. Davenport	Democratic	1907	Incumbent lost re-election. Republican gain.	▌ ✓ Charles E. Creager (Republican) 48.2%; ▌James S. Davenport (Democratic) 46.2%; ▌Winston T. Banks (Socialist) 5.4%
Oklahoma 4	Charles D. Carter	Democratic	1907	Incumbent re-elected.	▌ ✓ Charles D. Carter (Democratic) 50.6%; ▌Benjamin F. Hackett (Republican) 36.1%; ▌M. C. Carter (Socialist) 13.2%
Oklahoma 5	Scott Ferris	Democratic	1907	Incumbent re-elected.	▌ ✓ Scott Ferris (Democratic) 55.7%; ▌[FNU] Thompson (Republican) 34.4%; ▌W. D. Davis (Socialist) 9.8%

== Oregon ==
District	Incumbent			This race	
District	Member	Party	First elected	Results	Candidates
Oregon 1	Willis C. Hawley	Republican	1906	Incumbent re-elected.	▌ ✓ Willis C. Hawley (Republican) 58.8%; ▌J. J. Whitney (Democratic) 27.4%; ▌W. S. Richards (Socialist) 8.0%; ▌Daniel Staver (Prohibition) 5.9%
Oregon 2	William R. Ellis	Republican	1906	Incumbent re-elected.	▌ ✓ William R. Ellis (Republican) 63.6%; ▌John A. Jeffrey (Democratic) 24.8%; ▌G. E. Sanders (Socialist) 6.9%; ▌H. C. Shaffer (Prohibition) 4.8%

== Pennsylvania ==
District	Incumbent			This race	
District	Member	Party	First elected	Results	Candidates
Pennsylvania 1	Henry H. Bingham	Republican	1878	Incumbent re-elected.	▌ ✓ Henry H. Bingham (Republican/City) 76.2%; ▌ Michael J. Geraghty (Democratic) 21.5%; ▌ Horace A. McCall (Socialist) 1.7%; ▌ Isaac A. Ramsey (Prohibition) 0.6%
Pennsylvania 2	Joel Cook	Republican	1907	Incumbent re-elected.	▌ ✓ Joel Cook (Republican/City) 77.4%; ▌ William Schlipf Jr. (Democratic) 20.1%; ▌ Lorenzo Stitzenberger (Socialist) 1.7%; ▌ Burton L. Rockwood (Prohibition) 0.8%
Pennsylvania 3	J. Hampton Moore	Republican	1906	Incumbent re-elected.	▌ ✓ J. Hampton Moore (Republican/City) 76.6%; ▌ William Beerli (Democratic) 21.2%; ▌ Joseph Heintz (Socialist) 1.7%; ▌ Edward B. Cooper (Prohibition) 0.5%
Pennsylvania 4	Reuben Moon	Republican	1903	Incumbent re-elected.	▌ ✓ Reuben Moon (Republican) 66.2%; ▌ William H Albright (Democratic/City) 28.8%; ▌ Charles Doerr (Socialist) 2.7%; ▌ Michael J. Fanning (Prohibition) 1.6%; ▌ Henry J. Ruesskamf (Independence) 0.7%
Pennsylvania 5	William W. Foulkrod	Republican	1906	Incumbent re-elected.	▌ ✓ William W. Foulkrod (Republican/City) 66.7%; ▌ Michael Donohoe (Democratic) 26.0%; ▌ Ed Moore (Socialist) 3.9%; ▌ R. Bruce Burns (Independence) 2.5%; ▌ Harry Crowther (Prohibition) 0.9%
Pennsylvania 6	George D. McCreary	Republican	1902	Incumbent re-elected.	▌ ✓ George D. McCreary (Republican/City) 72.5%; ▌ Frederick J. Bailey (Democratic) 23.8%; ▌ Charles W. Evans (Socialist) 2.0%; ▌ John M. Doran (Prohibition) 1.7%
Pennsylvania 7	Thomas S. Butler	Republican	1896	Incumbent re-elected.	▌ ✓ Thomas S. Butler (Republican) 69.3%; ▌ D. P. Hibberd (Democratic) 26.9%; ▌ Shessie W. Ridgway (Prohibition) 3.8%; ▌ Walter N. Lodge (Socialist) 0.1%
Pennsylvania 8	Irving P. Wanger	Republican	1892	Incumbent re-elected.	▌ ✓ Irving P. Wanger (Republican) 59.9%; ▌ Wynne James (Democratic) 40.1%
Pennsylvania 9	Henry B. Cassel	Republican	1901	Incumbent retired. Republican hold.	▌ ✓ William Walton Griest (Republican) 74.8%; ▌ George B Willson (Democratic) 25.2%
Pennsylvania 10	Thomas D. Nicholls	Democratic	1906	Incumbent re-elected.	▌ ✓ Thomas D. Nicholls (Democratic) 51.1%; ▌ John R. Farr (Republican) 48.9%
Pennsylvania 11	John T. Lenahan	Democratic	1906	Incumbent retired. Republican gain.	▌ ✓ Henry W. Palmer (Republican) 51.9%; ▌ William S. Bigelow (Democratic) 45.8%; ▌ Charles Lavin (Socialist) 2.3%
Pennsylvania 12	Charles N. Brumm	Republican	1906	Incumbent resigned upon election to the court of common pleas of Schuylkill County. Republican hold.	▌ ✓ Alfred B. Garner (Republican) 51.9%; ▌ Robert Emmett Lee (Democratic) 45.6%; ▌ Cornelius F. Foley (Socialist) 2.5%
Pennsylvania 13	John H. Rothermel	Democratic	1906	Incumbent re-elected	▌ ✓ John H. Rothermel (Democratic) 53.3%; ▌ Alex N. Ulrich (Republican) 41.3%; ▌ Thomas J. Neatherry (Socialist) 3.8%; ▌ Wesley W. Bowman (Prohibition) 1.5%
Pennsylvania 14	George W. Kipp	Democratic	1906	Incumbent lost re-election. Republican gain.	▌ ✓ Charles C. Pratt (Republican) 51.2%; ▌ George W. Kipp (Democratic) 44.3%; ▌ E. H. Meeker (Prohibition) 3.8%; ▌ William Markham (Socialist) 0.6%
Pennsylvania 15	William B. Wilson	Democratic	1906	Incumbent re-elected.	▌ ✓ William B. Wilson (Democratic) 50.4%; ▌ Elias Deemer (Republican) 44.9%; ▌ C. H. Lugg (Prohibition) 3.6%; ▌ W. J. Brotherton (Socialist) 1.1%
Pennsylvania 16	John G. McHenry	Democratic	1906	Incumbent re-elected.	▌ ✓ John G. McHenry (Democratic) 57.1%; ▌ Edmund W. Samuel (Republican) 39.9%; ▌ J. E. Wolf (Prohibition) 3.0%
Pennsylvania 17	Benjamin K. Focht	Republican	1906	Incumbent re-elected.	▌ ✓ Benjamin K. Focht (Republican) 62.8%; ▌ George C. Bentz (Democratic) 37.2%
Pennsylvania 18	Marlin E. Olmsted	Republican	1896	Incumbent re-elected.	▌ ✓ Marlin E. Olmsted (Republican) 62.8%; ▌ John L. Whisler (Democratic) 31.5%; ▌ Thomas H. Hamilton (Prohibition) 3.4%; ▌ James V. Zerbe (Socialist) 2.3%
Pennsylvania 19	John Merriman Reynolds	Republican	1904	Incumbent re-elected.	▌ ✓ John Merriman Reynolds (Republican) 62.2%; ▌ Humphrey D. Tate (Democratic) 37.8%
Pennsylvania 20	Daniel F. Lafean	Republican	1902	Incumbent re-elected.	▌ ✓ Daniel F. Lafean (Republican) 52.0%; ▌ Edward D. Ziegler (Democratic) 45.9%; ▌ Charles E. Newcomb (Prohibition) 1.2%; ▌ Harry R. Pfeiffer (Socialist) 0.9%
Pennsylvania 21	Charles Frederick Barclay	Republican	1906	Incumbent re-elected.	▌ ✓ Charles Frederick Barclay (Republican) 50.3%; ▌ W. Harrison Walker (Democratic) 41.4%; ▌ B. W. McCoy (Prohibition) 6.1%; ▌ James D. Blair (Socialist) 2.2%
Pennsylvania 22	George F. Huff	Republican	1902	Incumbent re-elected.	▌ ✓ George F. Huff (Republican) 51.0%; ▌ Silas W. Kline (Democratic) 42.8%; ▌ R. A. Dornon (Prohibition) 6.2%
Pennsylvania 23	Allen F. Cooper	Republican	1902	Incumbent re-elected.	▌ ✓ Allen F. Cooper (Republican) 50.7%; ▌ Milton R. Travis (Democratic) 36.7%; ▌ William M. Likins (Prohibition) 10.2%; ▌ Washington Herd (Socialist) 2.5%
Pennsylvania 24	Ernest F. Acheson	Republican	1894	Incumbent lost renomination. Republican hold.	▌ ✓ John K. Tener (Republican) 52.2%; ▌ Charles H. Akens (Democratic) 27.9%; ▌ Frank Fish (Prohibition) 15.2%; ▌ Charles A. McKeever (Socialist) 4.6%
Pennsylvania 25	Arthur L. Bates	Republican	1900	Incumbent re-elected.	▌ ✓ Arthur L. Bates (Republican) 52.6%; ▌ John B. Brooks (Democratic) 38.4%; ▌ N. J. McIntyre (Prohibition) 5.9%; ▌ George B. Allen (Socialist) 3.1%
Pennsylvania 26	Joseph Davis Brodhead	Democratic	1906	Incumbent lost renomination. Democratic hold.	▌ ✓ A. Mitchell Palmer (Democratic) 52.8%; ▌ Gustav A. Schneebeli (Republican) 42.3%; ▌ George R. Miller (Socialist) 2.5%; ▌ A. F. Snyder (Prohibition) 2.4%
Pennsylvania 27	Joseph Grant Beale	Republican	1906	Incumbent lost renomination. Republican hold.	▌ ✓ J. N. Langham (Republican) 59.7%; ▌ John Smith Shirley (Democratic) 31.7%; ▌ J. T. Pender (Prohibition) 8.6%
Pennsylvania 28	Nelson P. Wheeler	Republican	1906	Incumbent re-elected.	▌ ✓ Nelson P. Wheeler (Republican) 55.1%; ▌ Till Reiss (Democratic) 33.1%; ▌ J. M. Brown (Prohibition) 11.8%
Pennsylvania 29	William H. Graham	Republican	1904	Incumbent re-elected.	▌ ✓ William H. Graham (Republican) 65.5%; ▌ John G. Schirmer (Democratic) 22.6%; ▌ J. W. Slayton (Socialist) 6.3%; ▌ John A. McConnell (Prohibition) 5.6%
Pennsylvania 30	John Dalzell	Republican	1886	Incumbent re-elected.	▌ ✓ John Dalzell (Republican) 58.2%; ▌ Edward F. Duffy (Democratic) 28.1%; ▌ William Adams (Socialist) 7.5%; ▌ Joseph Fidler (Prohibition) 6.3%
Pennsylvania 31	James F. Burke	Republican	1904	Incumbent re-elected	▌ ✓ James F. Burke (Republican) 66.6%; ▌ Thomas B. Alcorn (Democratic) 26.5%; ▌ James A. McCarthy (Socialist) 3.9%; ▌ W. A. Stewart (Prohibition) 3.0%
Pennsylvania 32	Andrew J. Barchfeld	Republican	1904	Incumbent re-elected	▌ ✓ Andrew J. Barchfeld (Republican) 58.1%; ▌ John Murphy (Democratic) 29.9%; ▌ Thomas F. Kennedy (Socialist) 6.4%; ▌ H. S. Gleiss (Prohibition) 5.6%

== Rhode Island ==
District	Incumbent			This race	
District	Member	Party	First elected	Results	Candidates
Rhode Island 1	Daniel L. D. Granger	Democratic	1902	Incumbent lost re-election and died before end of term. Republican gain.	▌ ✓ William Paine Sheffield Jr. (Republican) 48.6%; ▌ Daniel L. D. Granger (Democratic) 48.4%; ▌ Stanley Curtis (Socialist) 1.8%; ▌ Stephen A. Welch (Prohibition) 1.3%
Rhode Island 2	Adin B. Capron	Republican	1896	Incumbent re-elected.	▌ ✓ Adin B. Capron (Republican) 60.9%; ▌ John Cooney (Democratic) 36.0%; ▌ James G. Chase (Prohibition) 1.7%; ▌ (FNU) Carpenter (Socialist) 1.4%

== South Carolina ==
District	Incumbent			This race	
District	Member	Party	First elected	Results	Candidates
South Carolina 1	George Swinton Legaré	Democratic	1902	Incumbent re-elected.	▌ ✓ George Swinton Legaré (Democratic) 90.1%; ▌Aaron P. Prioleau (Republican) 9.9%
South Carolina 2	James O. Patterson	Democratic	1904	Incumbent re-elected.	▌ ✓ James O. Patterson (Democratic) 99.3%; ▌Isaac Myers (Republican) 0.7%
South Carolina 3	Wyatt Aiken	Democratic	1902	Incumbent re-elected.	▌ ✓ Wyatt Aiken (Democratic); Unopposed
South Carolina 4	Joseph T. Johnson	Democratic	1900	Incumbent re-elected.	▌ ✓ Joseph T. Johnson (Democratic); Unopposed
South Carolina 5	David E. Finley	Democratic	1898	Incumbent re-elected.	▌ ✓ David E. Finley (Democratic); Unopposed
South Carolina 6	J. Edwin Ellerbe	Democratic	1904	Incumbent re-elected.	▌ ✓ J. Edwin Ellerbe (Democratic); Unopposed
South Carolina 7	A. Frank Lever	Democratic	1901 (special)	Incumbent re-elected.	▌ ✓ A. Frank Lever (Democratic) 90.9%; ▌R. H. Richardson (Republican) 9.1%

== South Dakota ==
District	Incumbent			This race	
District	Member	Party	First elected	Results	Candidates
South Dakota at-large (2 seats elected on a general ticket)	Philo Hall	Republican	1906	Incumbent lost renomination. Republican hold.	▌ ✓ Eben Martin (Republican) 29.99%; ▌ ✓ Charles H. Burke (Republican) 29.91%; ▌Robert E. Dowdell (Democratic) 17.20%; ▌Andrew H. Olson (Democratic) 17.14%; ▌E. S. Chappell (Prohibition) 1.68%; ▌L. R. Erskine (Prohibition) 1.66%; ▌T. G. Deffebach (Socialist) 1.19%; ▌S. H. Goodfellow (Socialist) 1.18%; Others: ▌W. S. Bray (Scales of Justice) 0.02%; ▌L. V. Schneider (Scales of Justice) 0.02%
South Dakota at-large (2 seats elected on a general ticket)	Vacant (incumbent died June 26, 1908)			Republican hold.	▌ ✓ Eben Martin (Republican) 29.99%; ▌ ✓ Charles H. Burke (Republican) 29.91%; ▌Robert E. Dowdell (Democratic) 17.20%; ▌Andrew H. Olson (Democratic) 17.14%; ▌E. S. Chappell (Prohibition) 1.68%; ▌L. R. Erskine (Prohibition) 1.66%; ▌T. G. Deffebach (Socialist) 1.19%; ▌S. H. Goodfellow (Socialist) 1.18%; Others: ▌W. S. Bray (Scales of Justice) 0.02%; ▌L. V. Schneider (Scales of Justice) 0.02%

== Tennessee ==
District	Incumbent			This race	
District	Member	Party	First elected	Results	Candidates
Tennessee 1	Walter P. Brownlow	Republican	1896	Incumbent re-elected.	▌ ✓ Walter P. Brownlow (Republican) 79.46%; ▌J. T. Fugate (Democratic) 20.54%
Tennessee 2	Nathan W. Hale	Republican	1904	Incumbent lost re-election. Republican hold.	▌ ✓ Richard W. Austin (Republican) 50.85%; ▌Nathan W. Hale (Republican) 48.16%; Others: ▌L. L. Cross (Ind. Democratic) 0.62%; ▌Eugene Merrill (Socialist) 0.37%
Tennessee 3	John A. Moon	Democratic	1896	Incumbent re-elected.	▌ ✓ John A. Moon (Democratic) 60.19%; ▌John T. Raulston (Republican) 39.81%
Tennessee 4	Cordell Hull	Democratic	1906	Incumbent re-elected.	▌ ✓ Cordell Hull (Democratic) 54.87%; ▌R. Q. Lillard (Republican) 44.85%; ▌W. D. Fisk (Socialist) 0.29%
Tennessee 5	William C. Houston	Democratic	1904	Incumbent re-elected.	▌ ✓ William C. Houston (Democratic) 69.65%; ▌Z. T. Cason (Republican) 30.24%; ▌E. D. Morgan (Socialist) 0.11%
Tennessee 6	John W. Gaines	Democratic	1896	Incumbent lost renomination. Democratic hold.	▌ ✓ Francis Gracey Childers (Democratic) 97.29%; ▌James L. Hardaway (Socialist) 2.71%
Tennessee 7	Lemuel P. Padgett	Democratic	1900	Incumbent re-elected.	▌ ✓ Lemuel P. Padgett (Democratic) 64.20%; ▌J. S. Beasley (Republican) 35.81%
Tennessee 8	Thetus W. Sims	Democratic	1896	Incumbent re-elected.	▌ ✓ Thetus W. Sims (Democratic) 57.53%; ▌R. H. Thrasher (Republican) 42.21%; Others: ▌F. W. Earnshaw (Socialist) 0.21%; ▌M. McCampbell (Independence) 0.05%
Tennessee 9	Finis J. Garrett	Democratic	1904	Incumbent re-elected.	▌ ✓ Finis J. Garrett (Democratic) 73.33%; ▌W. L. Terrell (Republican) 26.67%
Tennessee 10	George Gordon	Democratic	1906	Incumbent re-elected.	▌ ✓ George Gordon (Democratic) 96.09%; ▌Robert H. Gowling (Socialist) 3.91%

== Texas ==
District	Incumbent			This race	
District	Member	Party	First elected	Results	Candidates
Texas 1	Morris Sheppard	Democratic	1902	Incumbent re-elected.	▌ ✓ Morris Sheppard (Democratic) 84.7%; ▌ H. L. McQuiston (Republican) 13.2%; ▌ J. C. Thompson (Socialist) 2.1%
Texas 2	Samuel B. Cooper	Democratic	1906	Incumbent lost renomination. Democratic hold.	▌ ✓ Martin Dies (Democratic) 81.9%; ▌ C. E. Smith (Republican) 15.3%; ▌ John Johnson (Socialist) 2.8%
Texas 3	Gordon J. Russell	Democratic	1902	Incumbent re-elected.	▌ ✓ Gordon J. Russell (Democratic) 74.3%; ▌ J. A. Harper (Republican) 21.0%; ▌ Reddin Andrews (Socialist) 4.8%
Texas 4	Choice B. Randell	Democratic	1900	Incumbent re-elected.	▌ ✓ Choice B. Randell (Democratic) 80.6%; ▌ R. H. Crabb (Republican) 16.1%; ▌ W. P. Beckley (Socialist) 3.3%
Texas 5	James Andrew Beall	Democratic	1902	Incumbent re-elected	▌ ✓ James Andrew Beall (Democratic) 84.4%; ▌ Marion T. Connor (Republican) 15.0%; ▌ John Kerrigan (Socialist) 0.6%
Texas 6	Rufus Hardy	Democratic	1906	Incumbent re-elected	▌ ✓ Rufus Hardy (Democratic) 84.4%; ▌ C. L. McCoy (Republican) 15.6%
Texas 7	Alexander W. Gregg	Democratic	1902	Incumbent re-elected	▌ ✓ Alexander W. Gregg (Democratic) 97.6%
Texas 8	John M. Moore	Democratic	1905	Incumbent re-elected.	▌ ✓ John M. Moore (Democratic) 77.6%; ▌ Thomas Martin Kennerly (Republican) 22.0%; ▌ Laura B. Payne (Socialist) 0.4%
Texas 9	George F. Burgess	Democratic	1900	Incumbent re-elected	▌ ✓ George F. Burgess (Democratic) 67.6%; ▌ O. S. York (Republican) 30.2%; ▌ Frank Hubbell (Socialist) 2.1%
Texas 10	Albert S. Burleson	Democratic	1898	Incumbent re-elected	▌ ✓ Albert S. Burleson (Democratic) 80.7%; ▌ Joseph W. Burke (Republican) 19.3%
Texas 11	Robert L. Henry	Democratic	1896	Incumbent re-elected	▌ ✓ Robert L. Henry (Democratic) 100%
Texas 12	Oscar W. Gillespie	Democratic	1902	Incumbent re-elected.	▌ ✓ Oscar W. Gillespie (Democratic) 81.6%; ▌ N. A. Dodge (Republican) 14.2%; ▌ G. V. Stratton (Socialist) 4.2%
Texas 13	John H. Stephens	Democratic	1896	Incumbent re-elected	▌ ✓ John H. Stephens (Democratic) 84.3%; ▌ Jasper W. Haney (Republican) 12.7%; ▌ W. R. Tramblade (Socialist) 2.0%
Texas 14	James L. Slayden	Democratic	1896	Incumbent re-elected	▌ ✓ James L. Slayden (Democratic) 99.5%
Texas 15	John Nance Garner	Democratic	1902	Incumbent re-elected	▌ ✓ John Nance Garner (Democratic) 61.7%; ▌ T. W. Moore (Republican) 37.9%; ▌ C. C. Heath (Socialist) 0.4%
Texas 16	William R. Smith	Democratic	1902	Incumbent re-elected	▌ ✓ William R. Smith (Democratic) 88.7%; ▌ G. W. Boynton (Republican) 10.2%; ▌ P. G. Zimmerman (Socialist) 1.1%

== Utah ==
District	Incumbent			This race	
District	Member	Party	First elected	Results	Candidates
Utah at-large	Joseph Howell	Republican	1902	Incumbent re-elected.	▌ ✓ Joseph Howell (Republican) 51.6%; ▌ L. R. Martineau (Democratic) 32.3%; ▌ Charles I. Douglas (American) 12.1%; ▌ Charles Crane (Socialist) 3.9%

== Vermont ==
District	Incumbent			This race	
District	Member	Party	First elected	Results	Candidates
Vermont 1	David J. Foster	Republican	1900	Incumbent re-elected.	▌ ✓ David J. Foster (Republican) 71.8%; ▌Emile Blais (Democratic) 26.0%; ▌Edwin R. Towle (Prohibition) 1.5%; ▌Joseph W. Dunbar (Socialist) 0.8%
Vermont 2	Kittredge Haskins	Republican	1900	Incumbent retired. Republican hold.	▌ ✓ Frank Plumley (Republican) 75.9%; ▌Andrew J. Sibley (Democratic) 21.9%; ▌William V. McLaughlin (Prohibition) 1.3%; ▌Timothy Ivers (Socialist) 0.9%

== Virginia ==
District	Incumbent			This race	
District	Member	Party	First elected	Results	Candidates
Virginia 1	William A. Jones	Democratic	1890	Incumbent re-elected.	▌ ✓ William A. Jones (Democratic) 74.5%; ▌George N. Wise (Republican) 25.2%; Others: ▌W. L. Jones (Republican) 0.2%; ▌Charles Rudolph (Socialist) 0.1%
Virginia 2	Harry L. Maynard	Democratic	1900	Incumbent re-elected.	▌ ✓ Harry L. Maynard (Democratic) 70.3%; ▌D. L. Groner (Republican) 29.5%; ▌W. B. Muller (Socialist) 0.2%
Virginia 3	John Lamb	Democratic	1896	Incumbent re-elected.	▌ ✓ John Lamb (Democratic) 77.2%; ▌J. G. Luce (Republican) 22.3%; ▌Thomas A. Hollins (Socialist) 0.5%
Virginia 4	Francis R. Lassiter	Democratic	1900 (special); 1902 (retired); 1906	Incumbent re-elected.	▌ ✓ Francis R. Lassiter (Democratic) 100%
Virginia 5	Edward W. Saunders	Democratic	1906 (special)	Incumbent re-elected.	▌ ✓ Edward W. Saunders (Democratic) 50.3%; ▌John M. Parsons (Republican) 49.6%; ▌E. Matthews (Independent) 0.1%
Virginia 6	Carter Glass	Democratic	1902 (special)	Incumbent re-elected.	▌ ✓ Carter Glass (Democratic) 65.9%; ▌M. Hartman (Republican) 25.6%; ▌John M. Parsons (Republican) 7.4%; ▌Jacob Harvey (Independent) 1.0%
Virginia 7	James Hay	Democratic	1896	Incumbent re-elected.	▌ ✓ James Hay (Democratic) 62.8%; ▌L. Pritchard (Republican) 37.2%
Virginia 8	Charles C. Carlin	Democratic	1907 (special)	Incumbent re-elected.	▌ ✓ Charles C. Carlin (Democratic) 79.7%; ▌J. W. Gregg (Republican) 20.3%
Virginia 9	C. Bascom Slemp	Republican	1907 (special)	Incumbent re-elected.	▌ ✓ C. Bascom Slemp (Republican) 56.3%; ▌J. Cloyd Byars (Democratic) 43.7%
Virginia 10	Henry D. Flood	Democratic	1900	Incumbent re-elected.	▌ ✓ Henry D. Flood (Democratic) 65.8%; ▌W. C. Franklin (Republican) 34.2%

== Washington ==
District	Incumbent			This race	
District	Member	Party	First elected	Results	Candidates
Washington 1	William E. Humphrey; Redistricted from the at-large district	Republican	1902	Incumbent re-elected.	▌ ✓ William E. Humphrey (Republican) 63.7%; ▌Charles H. Miller (Democratic) 33.9%; ▌D. Burgess (Socialist) 2.4%; ▌A. H. Sherwood (Prohibition) 0.0%
Washington 2	Francis W. Cushman; Redistricted from the at-large district	Republican	1898	Incumbent re-elected.	▌ ✓ Francis W. Cushman (Republican) 70.2%; ▌Browder D. Brown (Democratic) 27.8%; ▌Emil M. Herman (Socialist) 2.1%
Washington 3	William E. Humphrey; Redistricted from the at-large district	Republican	1898	Incumbent retired. Republican hold.	▌ ✓ Miles Poindexter (Republican) 61.0%; ▌William Goodyear (Democratic) 36.9%; ▌E. S. Reinert (Socialist) 2.0%

== West Virginia ==
District	Incumbent			This race	
District	Member	Party	First elected	Results	Candidates
West Virginia 1	William P. Hubbard	Republican	1906	Incumbent re-elected.	▌ ✓ William P. Hubbard (Republican) 51.28%; ▌E. L. Robinson (Democratic) 44.21%; ▌Thomas N. Barnes (Prohibition) 2.61%; ▌E. B. Hibbs (Socialist) 1.89%
West Virginia 2	George C. Sturgiss	Republican	1906	Incumbent re-elected.	▌ ✓ George C. Sturgiss (Republican) 51.06%; ▌B. H. Hines (Democratic) 45.92%; ▌George W. Herring (Prohibition) 2.06%; ▌W. H. Woodley (Socialist) 0.96%
West Virginia 3	Joseph H. Gaines	Republican	1900	Incumbent re-elected.	▌ ✓ Joseph H. Gaines (Republican) 53.19%; ▌Andrew Price (Democratic) 42.45%; ▌Charles Hill (Prohibition) 2.27%; ▌E. C. Bennett (Socialist) 2.10%
West Virginia 4	Harry C. Woodyard	Republican	1902	Incumbent re-elected.	▌ ✓ Harry C. Woodyard (Republican) 51.85%; ▌William O. Parsons (Democratic) 45.47%; ▌G. R. Williamson (Prohibition) 1.93%; ▌T. J. McDougle (Socialist) 0.75%
West Virginia 5	James A. Hughes	Republican	1900	Incumbent re-elected.	▌ ✓ James A. Hughes (Republican) 55.55%; ▌L. H. Clarke (Democratic) 43.07%; Others: ▌Willoughby Miller (Prohibition) 0.72%; ▌Charles M. Crouch (Socialist) 0.66%

== Wisconsin ==
Wisconsin elected eleven members of congress on Election Day, November 3, 1908.

District	Incumbent			This race	
District	Member	Party	First elected	Results	Candidates
Wisconsin 1	Henry Allen Cooper	Republican	1892	Incumbent re-elected.	▌ ✓ Henry Allen Cooper (Republican) 60.6%; ▌Henry A. Moehlenpah (Democratic) 31.8%; ▌William A. Jacobs (Social Dem.) 4.1%; ▌J. H. Berkey (Prohibition) 3.6%
Wisconsin 2	John M. Nelson	Republican	1906^{(special)}	Incumbent re-elected.	▌ ✓ John M. Nelson (Republican) 53.6%; ▌James E. Jones (Democratic) 45.5%; ▌W. A. Hall Sr. (Social Dem.) 0.9%
Wisconsin 3	James W. Murphy	Democratic	1906	Incumbent lost re-election. Republican gain.	▌ ✓ Arthur W. Kopp (Republican) 55.8%; ▌James W. Murphy (Democratic) 41.7%; ▌John Hardcastle (Prohibition) 2.4%; ▌E. A. Ketterer (Social Dem.) 0.1%
Wisconsin 4	William J. Cary	Republican	1906	Incumbent re-elected.	▌ ✓ William J. Cary (Republican) 39.1%; ▌William J. Kershaw (Democratic) 36.2%; ▌Edmund T. Melms (Social Dem.) 24.7%
Wisconsin 5	William H. Stafford	Republican	1902	Incumbent re-elected.	▌ ✓ William H. Stafford (Republican) 40.4%; ▌G. Holmes Daubner (Democratic) 31.7%; ▌Albert J. Welch (Social Dem.) 27.8%
Wisconsin 6	Charles H. Weisse	Democratic	1902	Incumbent re-elected.	▌ ✓ Charles H. Weisse (Democratic) 57.8%; ▌George W. Spratt (Republican) 40.1%; ▌George C. Damrow (Prohibition) 2.1%
Wisconsin 7	John J. Esch	Republican	1898	Incumbent re-elected.	▌ ✓ John J. Esch (Republican) 68.0%; ▌B. F. Keeler (Democratic) 31.0%; ▌W. Gray (Social Dem.) 1.0%
Wisconsin 8	James H. Davidson	Republican	1896	Incumbent re-elected.	▌ ✓ James H. Davidson (Republican) 57.3%; ▌Lyman J. Nash (Democratic) 37.2%; ▌Martin Georgenson (Social Dem.) 3.4%; ▌Byron E. Van Keuren (Prohibition) 2.1%
Wisconsin 9	Gustav Küstermann	Republican	1906	Incumbent re-elected.	▌ ✓ Gustav Küstermann (Republican) 53.6%; ▌Luther Lindauer (Democratic) 44.1%; ▌Joseph E. Harris (Social Dem.) 2.3%
Wisconsin 10	Elmer A. Morse	Republican	1906	Incumbent re-elected.	▌ ✓ Elmer A. Morse (Republican) 60.9%; ▌Wells M. Ruggles (Democratic) 39.1%
Wisconsin 11	John J. Jenkins	Republican	1894	Incumbent lost re-nomination. Republican hold.	▌ ✓ Irvine Lenroot (Republican) 71.7%; ▌J. S. Konkel (Democratic) 24.9%; ▌E. B. Harris (Social Dem.) 2.7%

== Wyoming ==
District	Incumbent			This race	
District	Member	Party	First elected	Results	Candidates
Wyoming at-large	Frank W. Mondell	Republican	1898	Incumbent re-elected.	▌ ✓ Frank W. Mondell (Republican) 57.06%; ▌Hayden M. White (Democratic) 36.32%; ▌James Morgan (Socialist) 6.62%

== Non-voting delegates ==
District	Incumbent			This race	
District	Delegate	Party	First elected	Results	Candidates
Alaska Territory at-large	Thomas Cale	Independent	1906	Incumbent retired. New delegate elected August 11, 1908. Republican gain.	▌ ✓ James Wickersham (Republican) 39.50%; ▌Joseph Chilberg (Labor) 24.76%; ▌John W. Corson (Republican) 22.22%; ▌John Ronan (Democratic) 10.46%; ▌John Clum (Unknown) 3.06%
Arizona Territory at-large
New Mexico Territory at-large	William Henry Andrews	Republican	1904	Incumbent re-elected November 3, 1908.	▌ ✓ William Henry Andrews (Republican) 49.41%; ▌Octaviano Ambrosio Larrazolo (Democratic) 48.72%; ▌W. P. Metcalf (Socialist) 1.87%

== See also ==
- 1908 United States elections
  - 1908 United States presidential election
  - 1908–09 United States Senate elections
- 60th United States Congress
- 61st United States Congress

== Bibliography ==
- Dubin, Michael J. (March 1, 1998). 1788 United States Congressional Elections-1997: The Official Results of the Elections of the 1st Through 105th Congresses. McFarland and Company. ISBN 978-0786402830.
- Martis, Kenneth C. (January 1, 1989). The Historical Atlas of Political Parties in the United States Congress, 1789-1989. Macmillan Publishing Company. ISBN 978-0029201701.
- Moore, John L., ed. (1994). Congressional Quarterly's Guide to U.S. Elections (Third ed.). Congressional Quarterly Inc. ISBN 978-0871879967.
- "Party Divisions of the House of Representatives* 1789–Present". Office of the Historian, House of United States House of Representatives.
- Secretary of State (1909). Maryland Manual 1908. Baltimore: Wm. J. C. Dulany Co.
