= Andrew French =

Andrew French may refer to:

- Andrew French (politician) (1859–1936), member of the Minnesota House of Representatives
- Andrew French (sculptor) (fl. 1990s), English-born abstract sculptor
