= Arthur P. Murphy =

American politician (1870–1914)

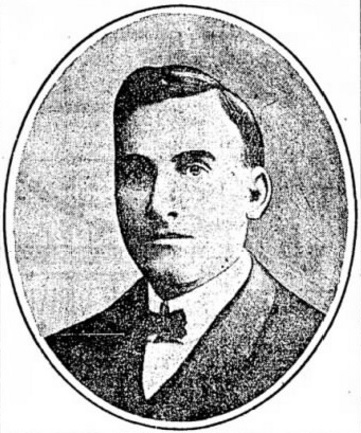

Member of the U.S. House of Representatives from Missouri's 16th district
- In office March 4, 1905 – March 3, 1907
- Preceded by: J. Robert Lamar
- Succeeded by: J. Robert Lamar
- In office March 4, 1909 – March 3, 1911
- Preceded by: J. Robert Lamar
- Succeeded by: Thomas L. Rubey

Personal details
- Born: December 10, 1870 Hancock, Missouri
- Died: February 1, 1914 (aged 43) Rolla, Missouri
- Resting place: Rolla Cemetery
- Education: Missouri School of Mines and Metallurgy
- Occupation: Telegraph operator
- Profession: Lawyer

Arthur Phillips Murphy (December 10, 1870 – February 1, 1914) was a U.S. representative from Missouri.

Born in Hancock, Missouri, Murphy attended the public schools of Pulaski County and the School of Mines and Metallurgy at Rolla, Missouri. He became a telegraph operator and later studied law. He was admitted to the bar March 4, 1894, and commenced practice in Rolla, Missouri. Murphy was an unsuccessful candidate for election as prosecuting attorney of Pulaski County in 1898.

In 1902, Murphy was appointed by President Theodore Roosevelt as attorney for the Creek Nation of Indians, a position he held until 1904.

Murphy was elected by Missouri's 16th congressional district as a Republican to the 59th US Congress (March 4, 1905 – March 3, 1907), early within which he sponsored a bill for Sequoyah statehood, though it was not considered. He was an unsuccessful candidate for reelection in 1906 to the 60th Congress.

Murphy was elected to the 61st Congress (March 4, 1909 – March 3, 1911). He was an unsuccessful candidate for reelection in 1910 to the 62nd Congress, and resumed the practice of law.

After a sudden death in Rolla, Missouri, on February 1, 1914, Murphy was interred in Rolla Cemetery.

U.S. House of Representatives
Preceded by J. Robert Lamar	Member of the U.S. House of Representatives from Missouri's 16th congressional district 1905–1907	Succeeded by J. Robert Lamar
Preceded by J. Robert Lamar	Member of the U.S. House of Representatives from Missouri's 16th congressional district 1909–1911	Succeeded by Thomas L. Rubey
