= 1907 United States House of Representatives elections =

There were ten elections in 1907 to the United States House of Representatives. Five were special elections in the 60th United States Congress and the other five were new seats from the new state of Oklahoma. There were no special elections in 1907 during the 61st United States Congress.

Elections are listed first by date, then by district.

== Special elections ==
District	Incumbent			This race	
District	Member	Party	First elected	Results	Candidates
Michigan 5	William Alden Smith	Republican	1894	Incumbent resigned February 9, 1907, when elected U.S. senator. New member elected April 27, 1907 and seated March 17, 1908. Republican hold.	▌ ✓ Gerrit J. Diekema (Republican) 51.79%; ▌George P. Hummer (Democratic) 45.74%; ▌Isaiah S. Morris (Prohibition) 1.27%; ▌John J. Spriggs (Socialist) 1.21%
Kansas 1	Charles Curtis	Republican	1892	Incumbent resigned January 28, 1907, when elected U.S. senator. New member elected May 23, 1907. Republican hold.	▌ ✓ Daniel R. Anthony Jr. (Republican) 84.06%; ▌Albert Kingsley (Socialist) 15.94%
Pennsylvania 2	John E. Reyburn	Republican	1906 (special)	Incumbent resigned March 31, 1907, to become Mayor of Philadelphia. New member elected November 5, 1907. Republican hold.	▌ ✓ Joel Cook (Republican) 97.99%; ▌John W. Barr (Prohibition) 2.01%
Virginia 8	John F. Rixey	Democratic	1896	Incumbent died February 8, 1907. New member elected November 5, 1907. Democratic hold.	▌ ✓ Charles C. Carlin (Democratic) 83.88%; ▌Ernest L. Howard (Republican) 16.12%
Virginia 9	Campbell Slemp	Republican	1902	Incumbent died October 13, 1907. New member elected November 5, 1907. Republican hold.	▌ ✓ C. Bascom Slemp (Republican) 69.12%; ▌David F. Bailey (Ind. Republican) 30.88%

== Oklahoma ==
Oklahoma became a state on November 16, 1907, and elected its first five members of the House:

District	Incumbent			This race	
District	Member	Party	First elected	Results	Candidates
Oklahoma 1	None (new state)			New seat. New member elected September 17, 1907. Republican gain.	▌ ✓ Bird Segle McGuire (Republican) 50.3%; ▌William L. Eagleton (Democratic) 47.3%; ▌Achilles W. Renshaw (Socialist) 2.4%
Oklahoma 2	None (new state)			New seat. New member elected September 17, 1907. Democratic gain.	▌ ✓ Elmer Fulton (Democratic) 51.0%; ▌Thompson B. Ferguson (Republican) 49.0%
Oklahoma 3	None (new state)			New seat. New member elected September 17, 1907. Democratic gain.	▌ ✓ James S. Davenport (Democratic) 52.7%; ▌Frank C. Hubbard (Republican) 47.3%
Oklahoma 4	None (new state)			New seat. New member elected September 17, 1907. Democratic gain.	▌ ✓ Charles D. Carter (Democratic) 62.6%; ▌Loren G. Disney (Republican) 33.1%; ▌J. T. Cumbie (Socialist) 4.3%
Oklahoma 5	None (new state)			New seat. New member elected September 17, 1907. Democratic gain.	▌ ✓ Scott Ferris (Democratic) 66.2%; ▌Henry D. McKnight (Republican) 29.9%; ▌Wood Hubbard (Socialist) 3.9%
