= Hancock, Missouri =

Unincorporated community in Missouri, U.S.

Coordinates: 37°59′11″N 92°10′55″W

Hancock is an unincorporated community in Pulaski County, in the U.S. state of Missouri.

== History ==
Hancock was platted in 1869, and named after Jap Hancock, a pioneer settler. A post office called Hancock was established in 1869, and remained in operation until 1955.
