= J. Robert Lamar =

American politician (1866–1923)

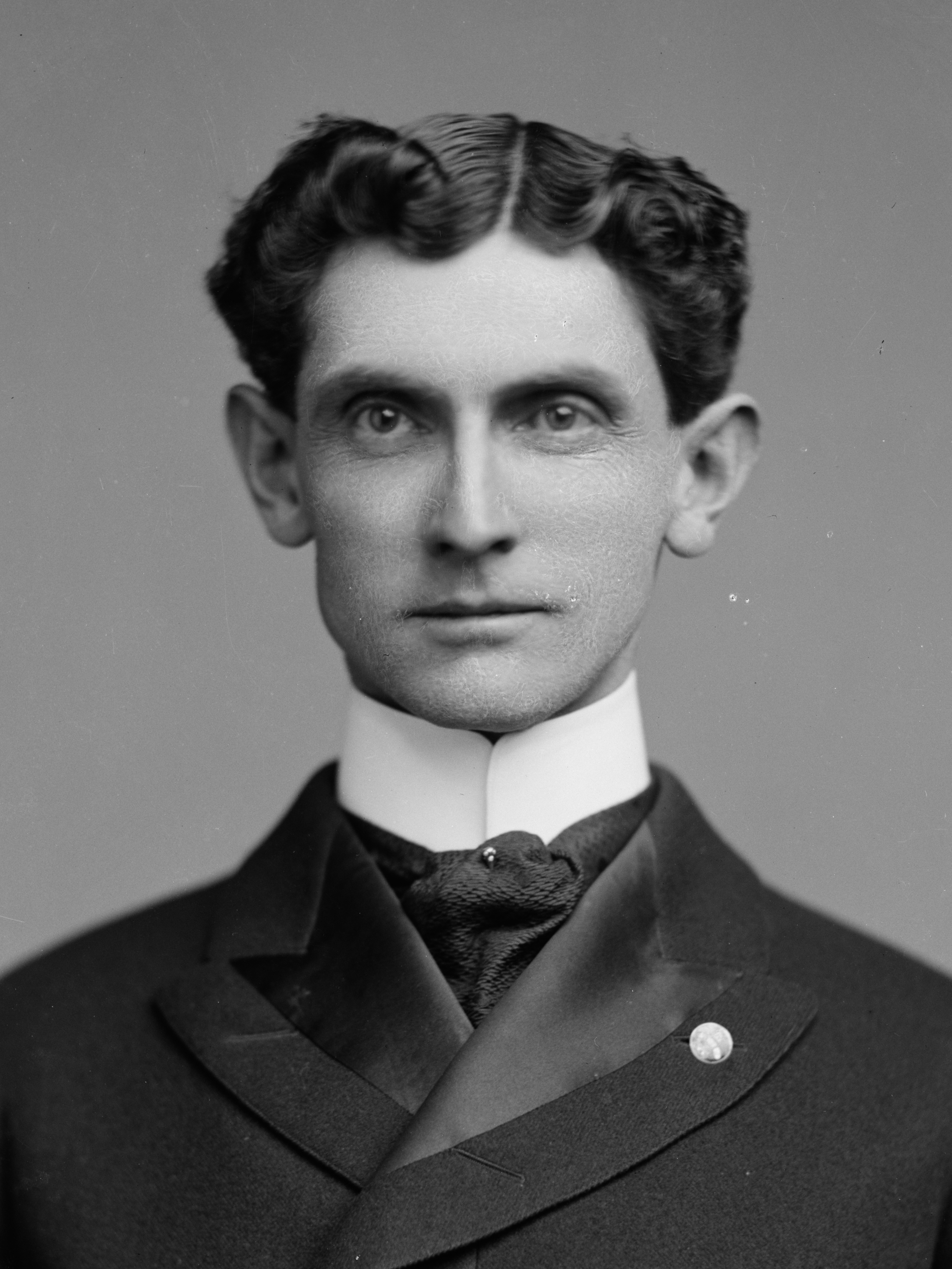
- Lamar in 1903, by Charles Milton Bell

Member of the U.S. House of Representatives from Missouri's 16th district
- In office March 4, 1907 – March 3, 1909
- Preceded by: Arthur P. Murphy
- Succeeded by: Arthur P. Murphy
- In office March 4, 1903 – March 3, 1905
- Preceded by: District created
- Succeeded by: Arthur P. Murphy

Personal details
- Born: James Robert Lamar; March 28, 1866 Edgar Springs, Missouri, US
- Died: August 11, 1923 (aged 57) St. Louis, Missouri, US
- Party: Democratic
- Relations: Lucius Quintus Cincinnatus Lamar; Mirabeau B. Lamar
- Profession: Politician, lawyer

James Robert Lamar (March 28, 1866 – August 11, 1923) was an American politician and lawyer. A Democrat, he was a member of the United States House of Representatives from Missouri.

== Early life ==
Lamar was born on March 28, 1866, in Edgar Springs, Missouri, one of four children born to Charles T. Lamar (1829–1878) and Nancy J. Lamar (died 1894). His father served in the Confederate States Army during the American Civil War. Lamar was descendent of the Huguenots and was distantly related to politicians Lucius Quintus Cincinnatus Lamar and Mirabeau B. Lamar. Lamar was educated at common schools and Licking Academy.

== Career ==
Lamar worked as an educator between Phelps and Texas Counties, and in 1889 was principal of Licking Academy. He studied law, and in May 1889, was admitted to the bar. He commenced practice in Rolla, moving to Houston, Missouri in January 1900. He practiced in the partnership Lamar & Lamar – alongside his brother Kirby, and between 1895 and 1899, was a partner in Hines & Lamar.

Lamar was a Democrat. From 1890 to 1894, he was prosecutor of Texas County, and from 1894 to 1896, was chairman of the 13th district's Democratic congressional committee. In 1897, he was a presidential elector.

Lamar was a member of the United States House of Representatives, representing Missouri's 16th district, and was the first person elected to the district. He served from March 4, 1903, to March 3, 1905, and again from March 4, 1907, to March 3, 1909. During his tenure, he was a member of the Committee on Naval Affairs, in which he supported a Navy budget increase from Theodore Roosevelt. He was majorly defeated in his 1906 and 1908 elections. In 1922 and 1923, he was a delegate to the Missouri State Constitutional Convention.

After serving in Congress, Lamar returned to practicing law in Houston. From 1921 to 1922, he was president of The Missouri Bar.

== Personal life and death ==
On October 16, 1889, Lamar married Jennie Rice; they had three children together, Fred, Lynn, and Ruth. He was a 32nd-degree member of the Knights Templar, as well as a member of the Independent Order of Odd Fellows. He died on August 11, 1923, aged 57, in St. Louis, from illness. His funeral was held on August 13, in Houston, and was the largest funeral in the city's history at the time. He was buried at Pine Lawn Cemetery, in Houston.

U.S. House of Representatives
Preceded by District created	Member of the U.S. House of Representatives from Missouri's 16th congressional district 1903–1905	Succeeded by Arthur P. Murphy
Preceded by Arthur P. Murphy	Member of the U.S. House of Representatives from Missouri's 16th congressional district 1907–1909	Succeeded by Arthur P. Murphy
