= Andrew French (politician) =

American politician (1859–1936)

Andrew W. French (December 10, 1859 – February 9, 1936) was a member of the Minnesota House of Representatives.

== Biography ==
French was born on December 10, 1859, in Green Lake County, Wisconsin. He became a farmer. He died in 1936 in Saint Paul, Minnesota.

== Political career ==
French was a member of the House of Representatives from 1891 to 1895 and was a Democrat. He lived in Plainview, Minnesota with his wife and family and was a farmer.
