= 1899 United States House of Representatives elections =

There were nine special elections to the United States House of Representatives in 1899 during the 56th United States Congress, which began on March 4, 1899. None of the special elections in 1899 were during the 55th United States Congress, which ended March 3, 1899.

District	Incumbent			This race	
District	Member	Party	First elected	Results	Candidates
Maine 2	Nelson Dingley Jr.	Republican	1880	Incumbent member-elect died January 13, 1899. New member elected June 19, 1899 and seated December 4, 1899 with the rest of the House. Republican hold.	▌ ✓ Charles E. Littlefield (Republican) 81.0%; ▌John Scott (Democratic) 19.1%
Louisiana 5	Samuel T. Baird	Democratic	1896	Incumbent died April 22, 1899. New member elected August 29, 1899 and seated December 4, 1899 with the rest of the House. Democratic hold.	▌ ✓ Joseph E. Ransdell (Democratic) 75.83%; ▌A. T. Nelson (Populist) 24.17%
Missouri 8	Richard P. Bland	Democratic	1872; 1894 (lost); 1896	Incumbent died June 15, 1899. New member elected August 29, 1899 and seated December 4, 1899 with the rest of the House. Democratic hold.	▌ ✓ Dorsey W. Shackleford (Democratic) 53.6%; ▌W. J. Vosholl (Republican) 44.0%
Maine 1	Thomas B. Reed	Republican	1876	Incumbent resigned September 4, 1899 to protest the Spanish–American War. New member elected November 7, 1899 and seated December 4, 1899 with the rest of the House. Republican hold.	▌ ✓ Amos L. Allen (Republican) 61.56%; ▌Luther F. McKinney (Democratic) 38.44%
Nebraska 6	William L. Greene	Populist	1896	Incumbent died March 11, 1899. New member elected November 7, 1899 and seated December 4, 1899 with the rest of the House. Populist hold.	▌ ✓ William Neville (Populist) 53.4%; ▌Moses P. Kinkaid (Republican) 46.6%
New York 34	Warren B. Hooker	Republican	1890	Incumbent member-elect resigned November 10, 1898 to become a Justice of the Supreme Court of New York. New member elected November 7, 1899 and seated December 4, 1899 with the rest of the House. Republican hold.	▌ ✓ Edward B. Vreeland (Republican) 63.7%; ▌S. E. Lewis (Democratic) 36.3%
Ohio 16	Lorenzo Danford	Republican	1872; 1878 (retired); 1894	Incumbent died June 19, 1899. New member elected November 7, 1899 and seated December 4, 1899 with the rest of the House. Republican hold.	▌ ✓ Joseph J. Gill (Republican) 55.5%; ▌Lavosier Spence (Democratic) 43.8%
Pennsylvania 9	Daniel Ermentrout	Democratic	1880; 1878 (lost); 1896	Incumbent died September 17, 1899. New member elected November 7, 1899 and seated December 4, 1899 with the rest of the House. Democratic hold.	▌ ✓ Henry D. Green (Democratic) 59.9%; ▌Jeremiah S. Parvin 40.1%
Kentucky 7	Evan E. Settle	Democratic	1896	Incumbent died November 16, 1899. New member elected December 18, 1899 and seated January 15, 1900. Democratic hold.	▌ ✓ June Ward Gayle (Democratic) 58.23%; ▌William C. Owens (Populist) 41.77%
