= 56th United States Congress =

1899–1901 legislative term

←	55th	57th	→
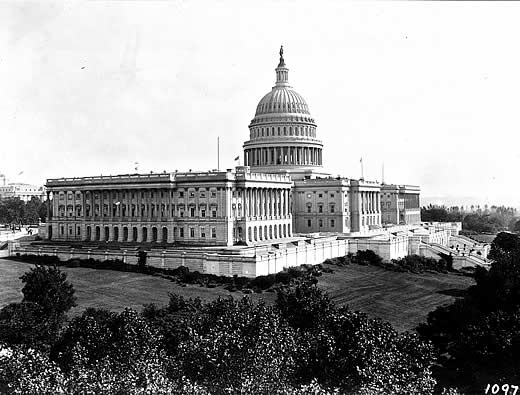
- United States Capitol (1906)

Overview
- Legislative body: United States Congress
- Jurisdiction: United States
- Term: March 4, 1899 – March 4, 1901

Senate
- Members: 90
- President: Garret Hobart (R) (until November 21, 1899); Vacant (from November 21, 1899)
- President pro tempore: William P. Frye (R)
- Party control: Republican

House of Representatives
- Members: 357 representatives 4 non-voting delegates
- Speaker: David B. Henderson (R)
- Party control: Republican

Sessions
- 1st: December 4, 1899 – June 7, 1900
- 2nd: December 3, 1900 – March 3, 1901

The 56th United States Congress was a meeting of the legislative branch of the United States federal government, composed of the United States Senate and the United States House of Representatives. It met in Washington, D.C., from March 4, 1899, to March 4, 1901, during the third and fourth years of William McKinley's presidency. The apportionment of seats in this House of Representatives was based on the 1890 United States census. Both chambers had a Republican majority. There was one African-American member, George Henry White of North Carolina, who served his second and final term as a representative in this Congress, and would be the last black member of Congress until 1928, and the last black member of Congress from the South until 1972.

== Major events ==
- June 2, 1899: The Filipino Rebellion began the Philippine–American War.
- November 21, 1899: Vice President Garret Hobart died.
- January 8, 1900: President McKinley placed Alaska under military rule.
- January 17, 1900: Brigham H. Roberts was refused a seat in the United States House of Representatives because of his polygamy.
- February 5, 1900: Britain and the United States signed a treaty for the building of a Central American shipping canal through Nicaragua.
- February 16, 1900: The United States, Germany and Great Britain ratified the Tripartite Convention partitioning the Samoan Islands.
- November 6, 1900: U.S. presidential election, 1900: Republican incumbent William McKinley was reelected by defeating Democratic challenger William Jennings Bryan.

== Major legislation ==
- March 14, 1900: Gold Standard Act, Sess. 1, ch. 41, 31 Stat. 45
- April 2, 1900: Foraker Act, Sess. 1, ch. 191, 31 Stat. 77 (Puerto Rico Civil Code)

== Territory organized ==
- April 30, 1900: Hawaii Territory was organized, Sess. 1, ch. 339, 31 Stat. 141

== Party summary ==
The count below identifies party affiliations at the beginning of the first session of this Congress, and includes members from vacancies and newly admitted states, when they were first seated. Changes resulting from subsequent replacements are shown below in the "Changes in membership" section.

=== Senate ===
Senate membership (final) 26 Democrats 53 Republicans 5 Populists 3 Silver Republicans 2 Silver (1 Vacant)

	Party (shading shows control)					Total	Vacant
	Democratic (D)	Populist (P)	Republican (R)	Silver Republican (SR)	Silver (S)	Total	Vacant
End of previous congress	34	5	44	5	2	90	0
Begin	26	4	50	3	2	85	5
End	25	5	53	3	2	88	2
Final voting share	28.4%	5.7%	60.2%	3.4%	2.3%		
Beginning of next congress	28	3	53	2	0	86	4

=== House of Representatives ===
	Party (shading shows control)					Total	Vacant
	Democratic (D)	Populist (P)	Republican (R)	Silver Republican (SR)	Silver (S)	Total	Vacant
End of previous congress	122	22	202	3	1	350	7
Begin	162	6	183	2	1	354	3
End	158	6	186	2	1	353	4
Final voting share	44.8%	1.7%	52.7%	0.6%	0.3%		
Non-voting members	1	0	2	0	0	3	1
Beginning of next congress	152	5	196	1	1	355	2

== Leadership ==
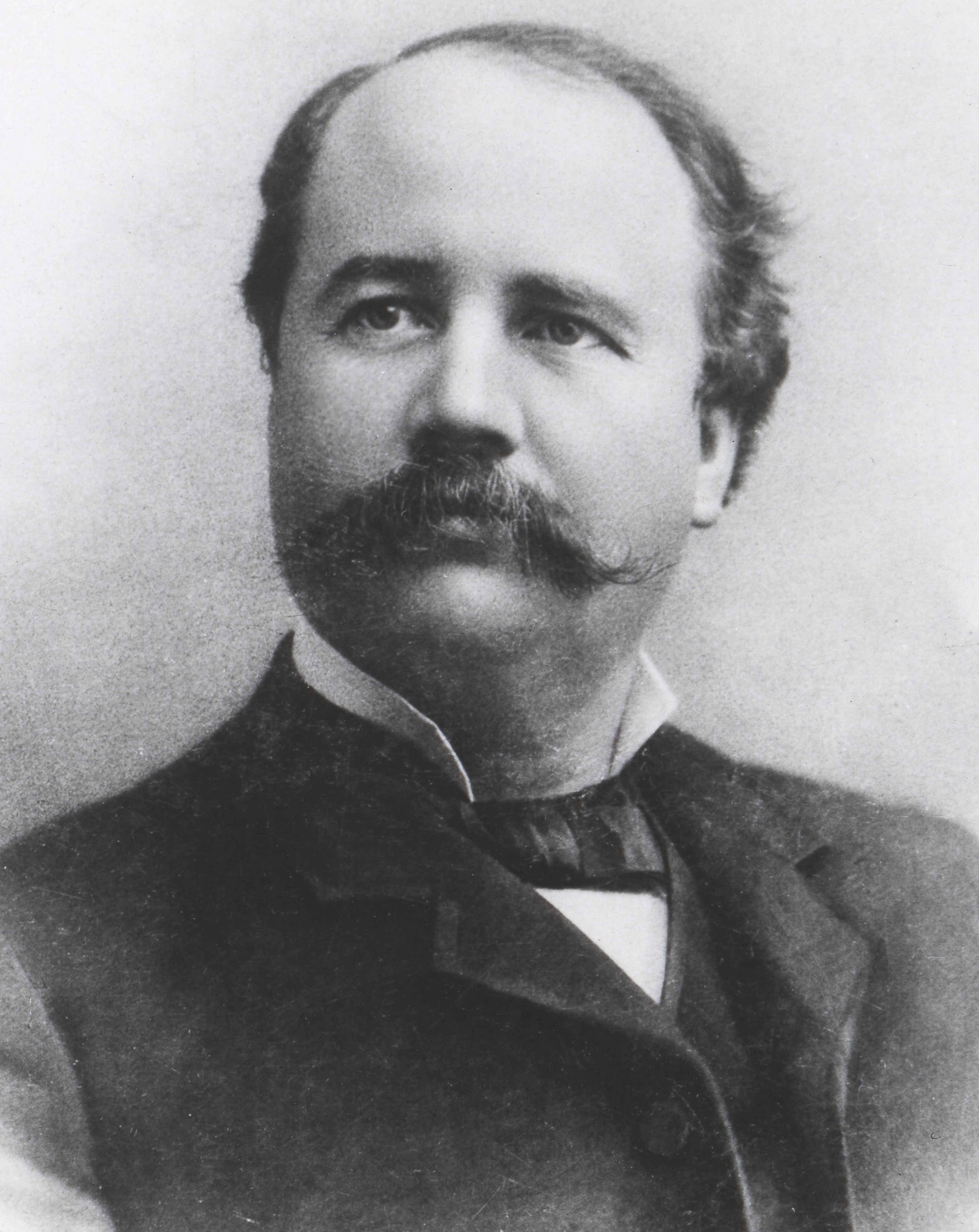
President of the Senate
Garret Hobart

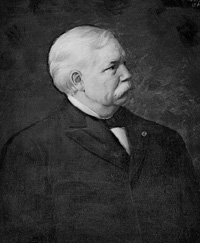
Speaker of the House
David B. Henderson

=== Senate ===
- President: Garret Hobart (R), until November 21, 1899; vacant thereafter.
- President pro tempore: William P. Frye (R)
- Democratic Caucus Chairman: James K. Jones
- Republican Conference Chairman: William B. Allison
- Democratic Campaign Committee Chairman: Stephen M. White

=== House of Representatives ===
- Speaker: David B. Henderson (R)
- Democratic Caucus Chairman: James Hay
- Republican Conference Chairman: Joseph G. Cannon
- Republican Campaign Committee Chairman: Joseph W. Babcock

==== Majority (Republican) leadership ====
- Majority Leader: Sereno E. Payne
- Majority Whip: James A. Tawney

==== Minority (Democratic) leadership ====
- Minority Leader: James D. Richardson
- Minority Whip: Oscar Underwood

== Members ==
This list is arranged by chamber, then by state. Senators are listed by class, and representatives are listed by district.

Skip to House of Representatives, below

=== Senate ===
At this time, senators were elected by the state legislatures every two years, with one-third beginning new six-year terms with each Congress. Preceding the names in the list below are Senate class numbers, which indicate the cycle of their election. In this Congress, Class 1 meant their term began with this Congress, requiring re-election in 1904; Class 2 meant their term ended with this Congress, requiring re-election in 1900; and Class 3 meant their term began in the last Congress, requiring re-election in 1902.

==== Alabama ====
▌2. John T. Morgan (D)
▌3. Edmund W. Pettus (D)

==== Arkansas ====
▌2. James H. Berry (D)
▌3. James K. Jones (D)

==== California ====
▌1. Thomas R. Bard (R), from February 7, 1900
▌3. George C. Perkins (R)

==== Colorado ====
▌2. Edward O. Wolcott (R)
▌3. Henry M. Teller (SR)

==== Connecticut ====
▌1. Joseph R. Hawley (R)
▌3. Orville H. Platt (R)

==== Delaware ====
1. vacant
▌2. Richard R. Kenney (D)

==== Florida ====
▌1. Samuel Pasco (D), until April 18, 1899

▌James Taliaferro (D), from April 19, 1899

▌3. Stephen R. Mallory (D)

==== Georgia ====
▌2. Augustus O. Bacon (D)
▌3. Alexander S. Clay (D)

==== Idaho ====
▌2. George L. Shoup (R)
▌3. Henry Heitfeld (P)

==== Illinois ====
▌2. Shelby M. Cullom (R)
▌3. William E. Mason (R)

==== Indiana ====
▌1. Albert J. Beveridge (R)
▌3. Charles W. Fairbanks (R)

==== Iowa ====
▌2. John H. Gear (R), until July 14, 1900

▌Jonathan P. Dolliver (R), from August 22, 1900

▌3. William B. Allison (R)

==== Kansas ====
▌2. Lucien Baker (R)
▌3. William A. Harris (P)

==== Kentucky ====
▌2. William Lindsay (D)
▌3. William J. Deboe (R)

==== Louisiana ====
▌2. Donelson Caffery (D)
▌3. Samuel D. McEnery (D)

==== Maine ====
▌1. Eugene Hale (R)
▌2. William P. Frye (R)

==== Maryland ====
▌1. Louis E. McComas (R)
▌3. George L. Wellington (R)

==== Massachusetts ====
▌1. Henry Cabot Lodge (R)
▌2. George F. Hoar (R)

==== Michigan ====
▌1. Julius C. Burrows (R)
▌2. James McMillan (R)

==== Minnesota ====
▌1. Cushman K. Davis (R), until November 27, 1900

▌Charles A. Towne (D), December 5, 1900 – January 23, 1901
▌Moses E. Clapp (R), from January 23, 1901

▌2. Knute Nelson (R)

==== Mississippi ====
▌1. Hernando D. Money (D)
▌2. William V. Sullivan (D)

==== Missouri ====
▌1. Francis Cockrell (D)
▌3. George G. Vest (D)

==== Montana ====
▌1. William A. Clark (D), until May 15, 1900
▌2. Thomas H. Carter (R)

==== Nebraska ====
▌1. Monroe L. Hayward (R), March 8, 1899 – December 5, 1899

▌William V. Allen (P), from December 13, 1899

▌2. John M. Thurston (R)

==== Nevada ====
▌1. William M. Stewart (S)
▌3. John P. Jones (S)

==== New Hampshire ====
▌2. William E. Chandler (R)
▌3. Jacob H. Gallinger (R)

==== New Jersey ====
▌1. John Kean Jr. (R)
▌2. William J. Sewell (R)

==== New York ====
▌1. Chauncey M. Depew (R)
▌3. Thomas C. Platt (R)

==== North Carolina ====
▌2. Marion Butler (P)
▌3. Jeter C. Pritchard (R)

==== North Dakota ====
▌1. Porter J. McCumber (R)
▌3. Henry C. Hansbrough (R)

==== Ohio ====
▌1. Marcus A. Hanna (R)
▌3. Joseph B. Foraker (R)

==== Oregon ====
▌2. George W. McBride (R)
▌3. Joseph Simon (R)

==== Pennsylvania ====
▌1. Matthew S. Quay (R), from January 16, 1901
▌3. Boies Penrose (R)

==== Rhode Island ====
▌1. Nelson W. Aldrich (R)
▌2. George P. Wetmore (R)

==== South Carolina ====
▌2. Benjamin R. Tillman (D)
▌3. John L. McLaurin (D)

==== South Dakota ====
▌2. Richard F. Pettigrew (SR)
▌3. James H. Kyle (P)

==== Tennessee ====
▌1. William B. Bate (D)
▌2. Thomas B. Turley (D)

==== Texas ====
▌1. Charles A. Culberson (D)
▌2. Horace Chilton (D)

==== Utah ====
▌1. Thomas Kearns (R), from January 23, 1901
▌3. Joseph L. Rawlins (D)

==== Vermont ====
▌1. Redfield Proctor (R)
▌3. Jonathan Ross (R), until October 18, 1900

▌William P. Dillingham (R), from October 18, 1900

==== Virginia ====
▌1. John W. Daniel (D)
▌2. Thomas S. Martin (D)

==== Washington ====
▌1. Addison G. Foster (R)
▌3. George Turner (SR)

==== West Virginia ====
▌1. Nathan B. Scott (R)
▌2. Stephen B. Elkins (R)

==== Wisconsin ====
▌1. Joseph V. Quarles (R)
▌3. John C. Spooner (R)

==== Wyoming ====
▌1. Clarence D. Clark (R)
▌2. Francis E. Warren (R)

Senators' party membership by state at the opening of the 56th Congress in March 1899. The green stripes represent Populists, while the gray stripes represent Silver Republicans. One of Delaware's seats was never filled. 2 Democrats 1 Democrat and 1 Republican 2 Republicans 2 Silver

=== House of Representatives ===
==== Alabama ====
▌1. George W. Taylor (D)
▌2. Jesse F. Stallings (D)
▌3. Henry D. Clayton (D)
▌4. Gaston A. Robbins (D), until March 8, 1900

▌William F. Aldrich (R), from March 8, 1900

▌5. Willis Brewer (D)
▌6. John H. Bankhead (D)
▌7. John L. Burnett (D)
▌8. Joseph Wheeler (D), until April 20, 1900

▌William N. Richardson (D), from December 3, 1900

▌9. Oscar Underwood (D)

==== Arkansas ====
▌1. Philip D. McCulloch Jr. (D)
▌2. John S. Little (D)
▌3. Thomas C. McRae (D)
▌4. William L. Terry (D)
▌5. Hugh A. Dinsmore (D)
▌6. Stephen Brundidge Jr. (D)

==== California ====
▌1. John A. Barham (R)
▌2. Marion De Vries (D), until August 20, 1900

▌Samuel D. Woods (R), from December 3, 1900

▌3. Victor H. Metcalf (R)
▌4. Julius Kahn (R)
▌5. Eugene F. Loud (R)
▌6. Russell J. Waters (R)
▌7. James C. Needham (R)

==== Colorado ====
▌1. John F. Shafroth (SR)
▌2. John C. Bell (P)

==== Connecticut ====
▌1. E. Stevens Henry (R)
▌2. Nehemiah D. Sperry (R)
▌3. Charles A. Russell (R)
▌4. Ebenezer J. Hill (R)

==== Delaware ====
▌At-large. John H. Hoffecker (R), until June 16, 1900

▌Walter O. Hoffecker (R), from November 6, 1900

==== Florida ====
▌1. Stephen M. Sparkman (D)
▌2. Robert W. Davis (D)

==== Georgia ====
▌1. Rufus E. Lester (D)
▌2. James M. Griggs (D)
▌3. Elijah B. Lewis (D)
▌4. William C. Adamson (D)
▌5. Leonidas F. Livingston (D)
▌6. Charles L. Bartlett (D)
▌7. John W. Maddox (D)
▌8. William M. Howard (D)
▌9. Farish C. Tate (D)
▌10. William H. Fleming (D)
▌11. William G. Brantley (D)

==== Idaho ====
▌At-large. Edgar Wilson (SR)

==== Illinois ====
▌1. James R. Mann (R)
▌2. William Lorimer (R)
▌3. George P. Foster (D)
▌4. Thomas Cusack (D)
▌5. Edward T. Noonan (D)
▌6. Henry S. Boutell (R)
▌7. George E. Foss (R)
▌8. Albert J. Hopkins (R)
▌9. Robert R. Hitt (R)
▌10. George W. Prince (R)
▌11. Walter Reeves (R)
▌12. Joseph G. Cannon (R)
▌13. Vespasian Warner (R)
▌14. Joseph V. Graff (R)
▌15. Benjamin F. Marsh (R)
▌16. William E. Williams (D)
▌17. Ben F. Caldwell (D)
▌18. Thomas M. Jett (D)
▌19. Joseph B. Crowley (D)
▌20. James R. Williams (D)
▌21. William A. Rodenberg (R)
▌22. George Washington Smith (R)

==== Indiana ====
▌1. James A. Hemenway (R)
▌2. Robert W. Miers (D)
▌3. William T. Zenor (D)
▌4. Francis M. Griffith (D)
▌5. George W. Faris (R)
▌6. James E. Watson (R)
▌7. Jesse Overstreet (R)
▌8. George W. Cromer (R)
▌9. Charles B. Landis (R)
▌10. Edgar D. Crumpacker (R)
▌11. George W. Steele (R)
▌12. James M. Robinson (D)
▌13. Abraham L. Brick (R)

==== Iowa ====
▌1. Thomas Hedge (R)
▌2. Joseph R. Lane (R)
▌3. David B. Henderson (R)
▌4. Gilbert N. Haugen (R)
▌5. Robert G. Cousins (R)
▌6. John F. Lacey (R)
▌7. John A. T. Hull (R)
▌8. William P. Hepburn (R)
▌9. Smith McPherson (R), until June 6, 1900

▌Walter I. Smith (R), from December 3, 1900

▌10. Jonathan P. Dolliver (R), until August 22, 1900

▌James P. Conner (R), from December 4, 1900

▌11. Lot Thomas (R)

==== Kansas ====
▌1. Charles Curtis (R)
▌2. Justin De Witt Bowersock (R)
▌3. Edwin R. Ridgely (P)
▌4. James Monroe Miller (R)
▌5. William A. Calderhead (R)
▌6. William A. Reeder (R)
▌7. Chester I. Long (R)
▌At-large. Willis Joshua Bailey (R)

==== Kentucky ====
▌1. Charles K. Wheeler (D)
▌2. Henry Dixon Allen (D)
▌3. John S. Rhea (D)
▌4. David Highbaugh Smith (D)
▌5. Oscar Turner (D)
▌6. Albert S. Berry (D)
▌7. Evan E. Settle (D), until November 16, 1899

▌June Ward Gayle (D), from January 15, 1900

▌8. George G. Gilbert (D)
▌9. Samuel J. Pugh (R)
▌10. Thomas Y. Fitzpatrick (D)
▌11. Vincent Boreing (R)

==== Louisiana ====
▌1. Adolph Meyer (D)
▌2. Robert C. Davey (D)
▌3. Robert F. Broussard (D)
▌4. Phanor Breazeale (D)
▌5. Samuel T. Baird (D), until April 22, 1899

▌Joseph E. Ransdell (D), from August 29, 1899

▌6. Samuel M. Robertson (D)

==== Maine ====
▌1. Thomas B. Reed (R), until September 4, 1899

▌Amos L. Allen (R), from November 6, 1899

▌2. Charles E. Littlefield (R), from June 19, 1899
▌3. Edwin C. Burleigh (R)
▌4. Charles A. Boutelle (R), until March 3, 1901

==== Maryland ====
▌1. John W. Smith (D), until January 12, 1900

▌Josiah Kerr (R), from November 6, 1900

▌2. William B. Baker (R)
▌3. Frank C. Wachter (R)
▌4. James W. Denny (D)
▌5. Sydney E. Mudd (R)
▌6. George A. Pearre (R)

==== Massachusetts ====
▌1. George P. Lawrence (R)
▌2. Frederick H. Gillett (R)
▌3. John R. Thayer (D)
▌4. George W. Weymouth (R)
▌5. William S. Knox (R)
▌6. William H. Moody (R)
▌7. Ernest W. Roberts (R)
▌8. Samuel W. McCall (R)
▌9. John F. Fitzgerald (D)
▌10. Henry F. Naphen (D)
▌11. Charles F. Sprague (R)
▌12. William C. Lovering (R)
▌13. William S. Greene (R)

==== Michigan ====
▌1. John B. Corliss (R)
▌2. Henry C. Smith (R)
▌3. Washington Gardner (R)
▌4. Edward L. Hamilton (R)
▌5. William Alden Smith (R)
▌6. Samuel W. Smith (R)
▌7. Edgar Weeks (R)
▌8. Joseph W. Fordney (R)
▌9. Roswell P. Bishop (R)
▌10. Rousseau O. Crump (R)
▌11. William S. Mesick (R)
▌12. Carlos D. Shelden (R)

==== Minnesota ====
▌1. James Albertus Tawney (R)
▌2. James T. McCleary (R)
▌3. Joel Heatwole (R)
▌4. Frederick C. Stevens (R)
▌5. Loren Fletcher (R)
▌6. R. Page W. Morris (R)
▌7. Frank Eddy (R)

==== Mississippi ====
▌1. John M. Allen (D)
▌2. Thomas Spight (D)
▌3. Thomas C. Catchings (D)
▌4. Andrew F. Fox (D)
▌5. John Sharp Williams (D)
▌6. Frank A. McLain (D)
▌7. Patrick Henry (D)

==== Missouri ====
▌1. James T. Lloyd (D)
▌2. William W. Rucker (D)
▌3. John Dougherty (D)
▌4. Charles F. Cochran (D)
▌5. William S. Cowherd (D)
▌6. David A. De Armond (D)
▌7. James Cooney (D)
▌8. Richard P. Bland (D), until June 15, 1899

▌Dorsey W. Shackleford (D), from August 29, 1899

▌9. James Beauchamp Clark (D)
▌10. Richard Bartholdt (R)
▌11. Charles F. Joy (R)
▌12. Charles E. Pearce (R)
▌13. Edward Robb (D)
▌14. Willard D. Vandiver (D)
▌15. Maecenas E. Benton (D)

==== Montana ====
▌At-large. Albert J. Campbell (D)

==== Nebraska ====
▌1. Elmer J. Burkett (R)
▌2. David H. Mercer (R)
▌3. John S. Robinson (D)
▌4. William L. Stark (P)
▌5. Roderick D. Sutherland (P)
▌6. William L. Greene (P), until March 11, 1899

▌William Neville (P), from December 4, 1899

==== Nevada ====
▌At-large. Francis G. Newlands (S)

==== New Hampshire ====
▌1. Cyrus A. Sulloway (R)
▌2. Frank G. Clarke (R) until January 9, 1901

==== New Jersey ====
▌1. Henry C. Loudenslager (R)
▌2. John J. Gardner (R)
▌3. Benjamin F. Howell (R)
▌4. Joshua S. Salmon (D)
▌5. James F. Stewart (R)
▌6. Richard Wayne Parker (R)
▌7. William D. Daly (D), until July 31, 1900

▌Allan L. McDermott (D), from December 3, 1900

▌8. Charles N. Fowler (R)

==== New York ====
▌1. Townsend Scudder (D)
▌2. John J. Fitzgerald (D)
▌3. Edmund H. Driggs (D)
▌4. Bertram T. Clayton (D)
▌5. Frank E. Wilson (D)
▌6. Mitchell May (D)
▌7. Nicholas Muller (D)
▌8. Daniel J. Riordan (D)
▌9. Thomas J. Bradley (D)
▌10. Amos J. Cummings (D)
▌11. William Sulzer (D)
▌12. George B. McClellan Jr. (D)
▌13. Jefferson M. Levy (D)
▌14. William A. Chanler (D)
▌15. Jacob Ruppert (D)
▌16. John Q. Underhill (D)
▌17. Arthur S. Tompkins (R)
▌18. John H. Ketcham (R)
▌19. Aaron V. S. Cochrane (R)
▌20. Martin H. Glynn (D)
▌21. John Knox Stewart (R)
▌22. Lucius N. Littauer (R)
▌23. Louis W. Emerson (R)
▌24. Charles A. Chickering (R), until February 13, 1900

▌Albert D. Shaw (R), November 6, 1900 – February 10, 1901

▌25. James S. Sherman (R)
▌26. George W. Ray (R)
▌27. Michael E. Driscoll (R)
▌28. Sereno E. Payne (R)
▌29. Charles W. Gillet (R)
▌30. James W. Wadsworth (R)
▌31. James M. E. O'Grady (R)
▌32. William H. Ryan (D)
▌33. De Alva S. Alexander (R)
▌34. Edward B. Vreeland (R), from November 7, 1899

==== North Carolina ====
▌1. John Humphrey Small (D)
▌2. George H. White (R)
▌3. Charles R. Thomas (D)
▌4. John W. Atwater (P)
▌5. William W. Kitchin (D)
▌6. John D. Bellamy (D)
▌7. Theodore F. Kluttz (D)
▌8. Romulus Z. Linney (R)
▌9. William T. Crawford (D), until May 10, 1900

▌Richmond Pearson (R), from May 10, 1900

==== North Dakota ====
▌At-large. Burleigh F. Spalding (R)

==== Ohio ====
▌1. William B. Shattuc (R)
▌2. Jacob H. Bromwell (R)
▌3. John L. Brenner (D)
▌4. Robert B. Gordon (D)
▌5. David Meekison (D)
▌6. Seth W. Brown (R)
▌7. Walter L. Weaver (R)
▌8. Archibald Lybrand (R)
▌9. James H. Southard (R)
▌10. Stephen Morgan (R)
▌11. Charles H. Grosvenor (R)
▌12. John J. Lentz (D)
▌13. James A. Norton (D)
▌14. Winfield S. Kerr (R)
▌15. Henry C. Van Voorhis (R)
▌16. Lorenzo Danford (R), until June 19, 1899

▌John J. Gill (R), from December 4, 1899

▌17. John A. McDowell (D)
▌18. Robert W. Tayler (R)
▌19. Charles W. F. Dick (R)
▌20. Fremont O. Phillips (R)
▌21. Theodore E. Burton (R)

==== Oregon ====
▌1. Thomas H. Tongue (R)
▌2. Malcolm A. Moody (R)

==== Pennsylvania ====
▌1. Henry H. Bingham (R)
▌2. Robert Adams Jr. (R)
▌3. William McAleer (D)
▌4. James R. Young (R)
▌5. Alfred C. Harmer (R), until March 6, 1900

▌Edward D. Morrell (R), from November 6, 1900

▌6. Thomas S. Butler (R)
▌7. Irving P. Wanger (R)
▌8. Laird H. Barber (D)
▌9. Daniel Ermentrout (D), until September 17, 1899

▌Henry D. Green (D), from November 7, 1899

▌10. Marriott Brosius (R)
▌11. William Connell (R)
▌12. Stanley W. Davenport (D)
▌13. James W. Ryan (D)
▌14. Marlin E. Olmsted (R)
▌15. Charles F. Wright (R)
▌16. Horace B. Packer (R)
▌17. Rufus K. Polk (D)
▌18. Thaddeus M. Mahon (R)
▌19. Edward D. Ziegler (D)
▌20. Joseph E. Thropp (R)
▌21. Summers M. Jack (R)
▌22. John Dalzell (R)
▌23. William H. Graham (R)
▌24. Ernest F. Acheson (R)
▌25. Joseph B. Showalter (R)
▌26. Athelston Gaston (D)
▌27. Joseph C. Sibley (D)
▌28. James K. P. Hall (D)
▌At-large. Samuel A. Davenport (R)
▌At-large. Galusha A. Grow (R)

==== Rhode Island ====
▌1. Melville Bull (R)
▌2. Adin B. Capron (R)

==== South Carolina ====
▌1. William Elliott (D)
▌2. William J. Talbert (D)
▌3. Asbury C. Latimer (D)
▌4. Stanyarne Wilson (D)
▌5. David E. Finley (D)
▌6. James Norton (D)
▌7. J. William Stokes (D)

==== South Dakota ====
▌At-large. Charles H. Burke (R)
▌At-large. Robert J. Gamble (R)

==== Tennessee ====
▌1. Walter P. Brownlow (R)
▌2. Henry R. Gibson (R)
▌3. John A. Moon (D)
▌4. Charles E. Snodgrass (D)
▌5. James D. Richardson (D)
▌6. John W. Gaines (D)
▌7. Nicholas N. Cox (D)
▌8. Thetus W. Sims (D)
▌9. Rice A. Pierce (D)
▌10. Edward W. Carmack (D)

==== Texas ====
▌1. Thomas H. Ball (D)
▌2. Samuel B. Cooper (D)
▌3. Reese C. De Graffenreid (D)
▌4. John L. Sheppard (D)
▌5. Joseph W. Bailey (D)
▌6. Robert E. Burke (D)
▌7. Robert L. Henry (D)
▌8. Samuel W. T. Lanham (D)
▌9. Albert S. Burleson (D)
▌10. Robert B. Hawley (R)
▌11. Rudolph Kleberg (D)
▌12. James L. Slayden (D)
▌13. John H. Stephens (D)

==== Utah ====
▌At-large. William H. King (D), from April 2, 1900

==== Vermont ====
▌1. H. Henry Powers (R)
▌2. William W. Grout (R)

==== Virginia ====
▌1. William A. Jones (D)
▌2. William A. Young (D), until March 12, 1900

▌Richard A. Wise (R), March 12, 1900 – December 21, 1900

▌3. John Lamb (D)
▌4. Sydney P. Epes (D), until March 3, 1900

▌Francis R. Lassiter (D), from April 19, 1900

▌5. Claude A. Swanson (D)
▌6. Peter J. Otey (D)
▌7. James Hay (D)
▌8. John F. Rixey (D)
▌9. William F. Rhea (D)
▌10. Julian M. Quarles (D)

==== Washington ====
▌At-large. Francis W. Cushman (R)
▌At-large. Wesley L. Jones (R)

==== West Virginia ====
▌1. Blackburn B. Dovener (R)
▌2. Alston G. Dayton (R)
▌3. David Emmons Johnston (D)
▌4. Romeo H. Freer (R)

==== Wisconsin ====
▌1. Henry Allen Cooper (R)
▌2. Herman B. Dahle (R)
▌3. Joseph W. Babcock (R)
▌4. Theobald Otjen (R)
▌5. Samuel S. Barney (R)
▌6. James H. Davidson (R)
▌7. John J. Esch (R)
▌8. Edward S. Minor (R)
▌9. Alexander Stewart (R)
▌10. John J. Jenkins (R)

==== Wyoming ====
▌At-large. Frank W. Mondell (R)

==== Non-voting members ====
▌Arizona Territory. John F. Wilson (D)
▌Hawaii Territory. Robert W. Wilcox (Home Rule), from November 6, 1900
▌New Mexico Territory. Pedro Perea (R)
▌Oklahoma Territory. Dennis T. Flynn (R)

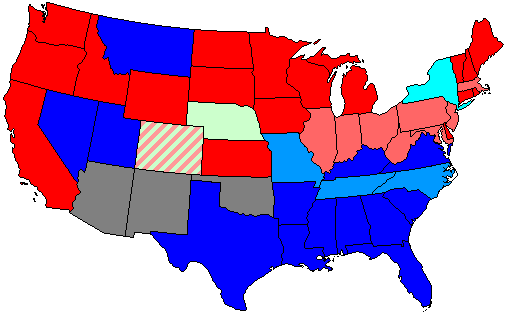
House seats by party holding plurality in state: 80+% to 100% Democratic / 80+% to 100% Republican; 60+% to 80% Democratic / 60+% to 80% Republican; Up to 60% Democratic / Up to 60% Republican

== Changes in membership ==
The count below reflects changes from the beginning of the first session of this Congress.

=== Senate ===
- Replacements: 7
  - Democratic: no net change
  - Republican: 1 seat loss
  - Populist: 1 seat gain
- Deaths: 3
- Resignations: 1
- Vacancies: 5
- Interim appointments: 2
- Total seats with changes: 9

State (class)	Vacated by	Reason for vacancy	Subsequent	Date of successor's installation
Delaware (1)	Vacant	Senator George Gray's (D) term had expired at the end of previous Congress having failed to get re-elected. Legislature failed to elect Senator for this Congress, seat remained vacant for the entire Congress.	Seat remained vacant until next Congress.	
Nebraska (1)	Vacant	Legislature failed to elect to fill vacancy in term.	Monroe Hayward (R)	March 8, 1899
California (1)	Vacant	Legislature failed to elect to fill vacancy in term.	Thomas R. Bard (R)	February 7, 1900
Florida (1)	Samuel Pasco (D)	Successor was elected April 18, 1899.	James Taliaferro (D)	April 20, 1899
Nebraska (1)	Monroe Hayward (R)	Died December 5, 1899. Successor was appointed.	William V. Allen (Pop.)	December 13, 1899
Montana (1)	William A. Clark (D)	Resigned May 15, 1900, over claim of election fraud. Seat remained vacant until the next Congress.	Vacant	
Iowa (2)	John H. Gear (R)	Died July 14, 1900. Successor was appointed and subsequently elected.	Jonathan P. Dolliver (R)	August 22, 1900
Vermont (3)	Jonathan Ross (R)	Successor was elected October 18, 1900.	William P. Dillingham (R)	October 18, 1900
Minnesota (1)	Cushman K. Davis (R)	Died November 27, 1900. Successor was appointed.	Charles A. Towne (D)	December 5, 1900
Pennsylvania (1)	Vacant	Due to a failure to elect, Governor appointed Quay at beginning of term, but Senate refused to seat him. He then won a special election.	Matthew Quay (R)	January 16, 1901
Minnesota (1)	Charles A. Towne (D)	Successor was elected January 23, 1901.	Moses E. Clapp (R)	January 28, 1901
Utah (1)	Vacant	failure to elect	Thomas Kearns (R)	January 23, 1901

=== House of Representatives ===
- Replacements: 21
  - Democratic: 5 seat loss
  - Republican: 5 seat gain
  - Populist: no net change
- Deaths: 12
- Resignations: 7
- Contested election: 3
- New seats: 1
- Total seats with changes: 26

District	Previous	Reason for change	Subsequent	Date of successor's installation
Maine 2nd	Vacant	Rep. Nelson Dingley Jr. died during previous congress	Charles E. Littlefield (R)	June 19, 1899
Utah At-large	Vacant	B. H. Roberts was denied seat. King was elected to finish term.	William H. King (D)	June 19, 1899
New York 34th	Vacant	Rep. Warren B. Hooker resigned during previous congress	Edward B. Vreeland (R)	November 7, 1899
Nebraska 6th	William L. Greene (Pop.)	Died March 11, 1899.	William Neville (Pop.)	December 4, 1899
Louisiana 5th	Samuel T. Baird (D)	Died April 22, 1899.	Joseph E. Ransdell (D)	August 29, 1899
Missouri 8th	Richard P. Bland (D)	Died June 15, 1899.	Dorsey W. Shackleford (D)	August 29, 1899
Ohio 16th	Lorenzo Danford (R)	Died June 19, 1899	Joseph J. Gill (R)	December 4, 1899
Maine 1st	Thomas B. Reed (R)	Resigned September 4, 1899.	Amos L. Allen (R)	November 6, 1899
Pennsylvania 9th	Daniel Ermentrout (D)	Died September 17, 1899.	Henry D. Green (D)	November 7, 1899
Kentucky 7th	Evan E. Settle (D)	Died November 16, 1899.	June Ward Gayle (D)	January 15, 1900
Maryland 1st	John W. Smith (D)	Resigned January 12, 1900, after being elected Governor of Maryland	Josiah Kerr (R)	November 6, 1900
New York 24th	Charles A. Chickering (R)	Died February 13, 1900	Albert D. Shaw (R)	November 6, 1900
Virginia 4th	Sidney P. Epes (D)	Died March 3, 1900.	Francis R. Lassiter (D)	April 9, 1900
Pennsylvania 5th	Alfred C. Harmer (R)	Died March 6, 1900	Edward Morrell (R)	November 6, 1900
Alabama 4th	Gaston A. Robbins (D)	Lost contested election March 8, 1900	William F. Aldrich (R)	March 8, 1900
Virginia 2nd	William A. Young (D)	Lost contested election March 12, 1900	Richard A. Wise (R)	March 12, 1900
Alabama 8th	Joseph Wheeler (D)	Resigned April 20, 1900.	William N. Richardson (D)	December 3, 1900
North Carolina 9th	William T. Crawford (D)	Lost contested election May 10, 1900	Richmond Pearson (R)	May 10, 1900
Iowa 9th	Smith McPherson (R)	Resigned June 6, 1900, after being appointed judge for the United States District Court for the Southern District of Iowa	Walter I. Smith (R)	December 3, 1900
Delaware At-large	John H. Hoffecker (R)	Died June 16, 1900	Walter O. Hoffecker (R)	November 6, 1900
New Jersey 7th	William D. Daly (D)	Died July 31, 1900.	Allan L. McDermott (D)	December 3, 1900
California 2nd	Marion De Vries (D)	Resigned August 20, 1900, after being appointed to the Board of General Appraisers	Samuel D. Woods (R)	December 3, 1900
Iowa 10th	Jonathan P. Dolliver (R)	Resigned August 22, 1900, after being appointed to the U.S. Senate	James P. Conner (R)	December 4, 1900
Hawaii Territory	New seat	Seat established by the Hawaiian Organic Act April 30, 1900	Robert W. Wilcox (Home Rule)	November 6, 1900
Virginia 2nd	Richard A. Wise (R)	Died December 21, 1900	Seat remained vacant until next Congress	
New Hampshire 2nd	Frank G. Clarke (R)	Died January 9, 1901	Seat remained vacant until next Congress	
New York 24th	Albert D. Shaw (R)	Died February 10, 1901	Seat remained vacant until next Congress	
Maine 4th	Charles A. Boutelle (R)	Resigned March 3, 1901	Seat remained vacant until next Congress	

== Committees ==
Lists of committees and their party leaders for members of the House and Senate committees can be found through the Official Congressional Directory at the bottom of this article. The directory after the pages of terms of service lists committees of the Senate, House (Standing with Subcommittees, Select and Special) and Joint and, after that, House/Senate committee assignments. On the committees section of the House and Senate in the Official Congressional Directory, the committee's members on the first row on the left side shows the chairman of the committee and on the right side shows the ranking member of the committee.

=== Senate ===
- United States Senate Select Committee on the Additional Accommodations for the Library of Congress (Select) (Chairman: James H. Berry; Ranking Member: Shelby M. Cullom)
- Agriculture and Forestry (Chairman: Redfield Proctor; Ranking Member: William B. Bate)
- Appropriations (Chairman: William B. Allison; Ranking Member: Francis M. Cockrell)
- Audit and Control the Contingent Expenses of the Senate (Chairman: John P. Jones; Ranking Member: Jacob H. Gallinger)
- Canadian Relations (Chairman: Mark Hanna; Ranking Member: Richard F. Pettigrew)
- Census (Chairman: Thomas H. Carter; Ranking Member: Samuel D. McEnery)
- Civil Service and Retrenchment (Chairman: Lucien Baker; Ranking Member: Horace Chilton)
- Claims (Chairman: Francis E. Warren; Ranking Member: Henry M. Teller)
- Coast and Insular Survey (Chairman: Addison G. Foster; Ranking Member: John T. Morgan)
- Coast Defenses (Chairman: George W. McBride; Ranking Member: Marion Butler)
- Commerce (Chairman: William P. Frye; Ranking Member: George G. Vest)
- Corporations Organized in the District of Columbia (Chairman: Donelson Caffery; Ranking Member: Nelson W. Aldrich)
- Cuban Relations (Chairman: Orville H. Platt; Ranking Member: Henry M. Teller)
- Distributing Public Revenue Among the States (Select)
- District of Columbia (Chairman: James McMillan; Ranking Member: Nelson W. Aldrich)
- Education and Labor (Chairman: James H. Kyle; Ranking Member: Donelson Caffery)
- Engrossed Bills (Chairman: Francis M. Cockrell; Ranking Member: George F. Hoar)
- Enrolled Bills (Chairman: William J. Sewell; Ranking Member: Donelson Caffery)
- Establish a University in the United States (Select) (Chairman: George L. Wellington; Ranking Member: James K. Jones)
- Examine the Several Branches in the Civil Service (Chairman: Jonathan Rose; Ranking Member: Thomas B. Turley)
- Expenditures in Executive Departments
- Finance (Chairman: Nelson W. Aldrich; Ranking Member: John P. Jones)
- Fisheries (Chairman: George C. Perkins; Ranking Member: Marion Butler)
- Five Civilized Tribes of Indians (Select) (Chairman: William B. Bate; Ranking Member: Orville H. Platt)
- Foreign Relations (Chairman: Cushman K. Davis; Ranking Member: John T. Morgan)
- Forest Reservations and the Protection of Game (Chairman: Albert J. Beveridge; Ranking Member: John T. Morgan)
- Geological Survey (Select) (Chairman: Stephen B. Elkins; Ranking Member: Hernando D. Money)
- Immigration (Chairman: Boies Penrose; Ranking Member: Joseph L. Rawlins)
- Indian Affairs (Chairman: John M. Thurston; Ranking Member: John T. Morgan)
- Indian Depredations (Chairman: William J. Deboe; Ranking Member: William Lindsay)
- Irrigation and Reclamation (Chairman: Joseph Simon; Ranking Member: William A. Harris)
- Industrial Expositions (Select) (Chairman: Chauncey M. Depew; Ranking Member: George G. Vest)
- Interoceanic Canals (Chairman: John Tyler Morgan; Ranking Member: Joseph R. Hawley)
- Interstate Commerce (Chairman: Shelby M. Cullom; Ranking Member: William Lindsay)
- Judiciary (Chairman: George F. Hoar; Ranking Member: Henry M. Teller)
- Library (Chairman: George P. Wetmore; Ranking Member: Francis M. Cockrell)
- Manufactures (Chairman: William E. Mason; Ranking Member: William A. Harris)
- Military Affairs (Chairman: Joseph Hawley; Ranking Member: William B. Bate)
- Mines and Mining (Chairman: William M. Stewart; Ranking Member: Benjamin R. Tillman)
- Mississippi River and its Tributaries (Select) (Chairman: Knute Nelson; Ranking Member: William B. Bate)
- National Banks (Select) (Chairman: John Kean; Ranking Member: Horace Chilton)
- Naval Affairs (Chairman: Eugene Hale; Ranking Member: Benjamin R. Tillman)
- Nicaragua Canal (Select)
- Pacific Islands and Puerto Rico (Chairman: Joseph B. Foraker; Ranking Member: Francis M. Cockrell)
- Pacific Railroads (Chairman: John H. Gear; Ranking Member: John T. Morgan)
- Patents (Chairman: Jeter C. Pritchard; Ranking Member: Stephen R. Mallory)
- Pensions (Chairman: Jacob H. Gallinger; Ranking Member: William Lindsay)
- Philippines (Chairman: Henry Cabot Lodge; Ranking Member: Joseph L. Rawlins)
- Post Office and Post Roads (Chairman: Edward O. Wolcott; Ranking Member: Marion Butler)
- Potomac River Front (Select) (Chairman: Nathan B. Scott; Ranking Member: Thomas S. Martin)
- Printing (Chairman: Thomas C. Platt; Ranking Member: James K. Jones)
- Private Land Claims (Chairman: Henry M. Teller; Ranking Member: Eugene Hale)
- Privileges and Elections (Chairman: William E. Chandler; Ranking Member: Donelson Caffery)
- Public Buildings and Grounds (Chairman: Charles W. Fairbanks; Ranking Member: George G. Vest)
- Public Health and National Quarantine (Chairman: George G. Vest; Ranking Member: Jacob H. Gallinger)
- Public Lands (Chairman: Henry C. Hansbrough; Ranking Member: James H. Berry)
- Railroads (Chairman: Clarence D. Clark; Ranking Member: Augustus O. Bacon)
- Revision of the Laws (Chairman: Julius C. Burrows; Ranking Member: John W. Daniel)
- Revolutionary Claims (Chairman: William Lindsay; Ranking Member: William J. Deboe)
- Rules (Chairman: John C. Spooner; Ranking Member: Henry M. Teller)
- Tariff Regulation (Select)
- Territories (Chairman: George L. Shoup; Ranking Member: William B. Bate)
- Transportation and Sale of Meat Products (Select) (Chairman: Richard F. Pettigrew; Ranking Member: Edward O. Wolcott)
- Transportation Routes to the Seaboard (Chairman: Joseph V. Quarles; Ranking Member: George Turner)
- Trespassers upon Indian Lands (Chairman: Porter J. McCumber; Ranking Member: N/A)
- Washington City Centennial (Select)
- Whole
- Woman Suffrage (Select) (Chairman: John W. Daniel; Ranking Member: George Frisbie Hoar)

=== House of Representatives ===
- Accounts (Chairman: Melville Bull; Ranking Member: Charles L. Bartlett)
- Agriculture (Chairman: James W. Wadsworth; Ranking Member: John S. Williams)
- Alcoholic Liquor Traffic (Chairman: Nehemiah D. Sperry; Ranking Member: Oscar Turner)
- Appropriations (Chairman: Joseph G. Cannon; Ranking Member: Leonidas F. Livingston)
- Banking and Currency (Chairman: Marriott Brosius; Ranking Member: Nicholas N. Cox)
- Claims (Chairman: Joseph V. Graff; Ranking Member: Edward Robb)
- Coinage, Weights and Measures (Chairman: James H. Southard; Ranking Member: Edwin R. Ridgely)
- Disposition of Executive Papers
- District of Columbia (Chairman: Joseph W. Babcock; Ranking Member: Adolph Meyer)
- Education (Chairman: Galusha A. Grow; Ranking Member: David A. De Armond)
- Election of the President, Vice President and Representatives in Congress (Chairman: John B. Corliss; Ranking Member: William W. Rucker)
- Elections No.#1 (Chairman: Robert W. Tayler; Ranking Member: Charles L. Bartlett)
- Elections No.#2 (Chairman: Walter L. Weaver; Ranking Member: James M. Robinson)
- Elections No.#3 (Chairman: William S. Mesick; Ranking Member: Robert W. Miers)
- Enrolled Bills (Chairman: William B. Baker; Ranking Member: James T. Lloyd)
- Expenditures in the Agriculture Department (Chairman: Charles W. Gillet; Ranking Member: James W. Ryan)
- Expenditures in the Interior Department (Chairman: Charles Curtis; Ranking Member: Thomas C. Catchings)
- Expenditures in the Justice Department (Chairman: Jonathan P. Dolliver; Ranking Member: Daniel J. Riordan)
- Expenditures in the Navy Department (Chairman: James F. Stewart; Ranking Member: Stanyarne Wilson)
- Expenditures in the Post Office Department (Chairman: Irving P. Wanger; Ranking Member: Edward Robb)
- Expenditures in the State Department (Chairman: William A. Smith; Ranking Member: Rufus E. Lester)
- Expenditures in the Treasury Department (Chairman: Robert G. Cousins; Ranking Member: William L. Terry)
- Expenditures in the War Department (Chairman: William W. Grout; Ranking Member: William L. Stark)
- Expenditures on Public Buildings
- Foreign Affairs (Chairman: Robert R. Hitt; Ranking Member: Hugh A. Dinsmore)
- Immigration and Naturalization (Chairman: William B. Shattuc; Ranking Member: Peter J. Otey)
- Indian Affairs (Chairman: James S. Sherman; Ranking Member: John S. Little)
- Insular Affairs (Chairman: Henry A. Cooper; Ranking Member: William A. Jones)
- Interstate and Foreign Commerce (Chairman: William P. Hepburn; Ranking Member: William McAleer)
- Invalid Pensions (Chairman: Cyrus A. Sulloway; Ranking Member: Robert W. Miers)
- Irrigation of Arid Lands (Chairman: Thomas H. Tongue; Ranking Member: John F. Shafroth)
- Judiciary (Chairman: George W. Ray; Ranking Member: William L. Terry)
- Labor (Chairman: John J. Gardner; Ranking Member: W. Jasper Talbert)
- Levees and Improvements of the Mississippi River (Chairman: Richard Bartholdt; Ranking Member: John M. Allen)
- Library (Chairman: Alfred C. Harmer; Ranking Member: Amos J. Cummings)
- Manufactures (Chairman: George W. Faris; Ranking Member: Willard D. Vandiver)
- Merchant Marine and Fisheries (Chairman: Charles H. Grosvenor; Ranking Member: John F. Fitzgerald)
- Mileage (Chairman: John A. Barham; Ranking Member: Samuel B. Cooper)
- Military Affairs (Chairman: John A.T. Hull; Ranking Member: William Sulzer)
- Militia (Chairman: Charles Dick; Ranking Member: William L. Stark)
- Mines and Mining (Chairman: Rousseau O. Crump; Ranking Member: Farish C. Tate)
- Naval Affairs (Chairman: Charles A. Boutelle; Ranking Member: Amos J. Cummings)
- Pacific Railroads (Chairman: H. Henry Powers; Ranking Member: James L. Slayden)
- Patents (Chairman: Winfield S. Kerr; Ranking Member: William Sulzer)
- Pensions (Chairman: Henry C. Loudenslager; Ranking Member: Jesse F. Stallings)
- Post Office and Post Roads (Chairman: Eugene F. Loud; Ranking Member: Claude A. Swanson)
- Printing (Chairman: Joel P. Heatwole; Ranking Member: Farish C. Tate)
- Private Land Claims (Chairman: George W. Smith; Ranking Member: William A. Jones)
- Public Buildings and Grounds (Chairman: David H. Mercer; Ranking Member: John H. Bankhead)
- Public Lands (Chairman: John F. Lacey; Ranking Member: John F. Shafroth)
- Railways and Canals (Chairman: Charles A. Chickering; Ranking Member: Reese C. De Graffenreid)
- Reform in the Civil Service (Chairman: Frederick H. Gillett; Ranking Member: Samuel M. Robertson)
- Revision of Laws (Chairman: Vespasian Warner; Ranking Member: James T. Lloyd)
- Rivers and Harbors (Chairman: Theodore E. Burton; Ranking Member: Thomas C. Catchings)
- Rules (Chairman: John Dalzell; Ranking Member: James D. Richardson)
- Standards of Official Conduct
- Territories (Chairman: William S. Knox; Ranking Member: William McAleer)
- Ventilation and Acoustics (Chairman: George W. Prince; Ranking Member: David H. Smith)
- War Claims (Chairman: Thaddeus M. Mahon; Ranking Member: Patrick Henry)
- Ways and Means (Chairman: Sereno E. Payne; Ranking Member: James D. Richardson)
- Whole

=== Joint committees ===
- Conditions of Indian Tribes (Special)
- Disposition of (Useless) Executive Papers
- The Library
- Printing

== Caucuses ==
- Democratic (House)
- Democratic (Senate)

== Employees ==
=== Legislative branch agency directors ===
- Architect of the Capitol: Edward Clark
- Librarian of Congress: John Russell Young, until 1899
  - Herbert Putnam, from 1899
- Public Printer of the United States: Francis W. Palmer

=== Senate ===
- Chaplain: William H. Millburn (Methodist)
- Secretary: William Ruffin Cox, until February 1, 1900
  - Charles G. Bennett, elected February 1, 1900
- Librarian: Alonzo M. Church
- Sergeant at Arms: Richard J. Bright, until February 1, 1900
  - Daniel M. Ransdell, elected February 1, 1900

=== House of Representatives ===
- Chaplain: Henry N. Couden (Universalist)
- Clerk: Alexander McDowell
- Clerk at the Speaker's Table: Asher C. Hinds
- Doorkeeper: William J. Glenn
- Postmaster: Joseph C. McElroy
- Reading Clerks: E. L. Lampson (D) and Dennis E. Alward (R)
- Sergeant at Arms: Benjamin F. Russell, until December 4, 1899
  - Henry Casson, from December 4, 1899

== See also ==
- 1898 United States elections (elections leading to this Congress)
  - 1898–99 United States Senate elections
  - 1898 United States House of Representatives elections
- 1900 United States elections (elections during this Congress, leading to the next Congress)
  - 1900 United States presidential election
  - 1900–01 United States Senate elections
  - 1900 United States House of Representatives elections
