= Senator Cromwell =

Senator Cromwell may refer to:

- E. Finley Cromwell (1855–1947), Virginia State Senate
- George Cromwell (1860–1934), New York State Senate

== See also ==
- William Cromwell, a fictional U.S. Senator in Strange Bedfellows
