= Whigville =

Whigville may refer to:

- Whigville, Connecticut, a hamlet in the town of Burlington
- Whigville, Michigan, an unincorporated community in Genesee County
- Whigville, Ohio, an unincorporated community in Noble County
