= William Albin Young =

American politician

Member of the U.S. House of Representatives from Virginia's 2nd district
- In office March 4, 1899 – March 12, 1900
- Preceded by: Richard A. Wise
- Succeeded by: Richard A. Wise
- In office March 4, 1897 – April 26, 1898
- Preceded by: D. Gardiner Tyler
- Succeeded by: Richard A. Wise

Member of the Virginia House of Delegates
- In office 1910–1912

Personal details
- Born: May 17, 1860 Norfolk, Virginia
- Died: March 12, 1928 (aged 67) Norfolk, Virginia
- Party: Democratic
- Profession: businessman

William Albin Young (May 17, 1860 – March 12, 1928) was an American politician and businessman from Virginia. Young was twice elected to the United States House of Representatives, though his election was successfully contested each time by Richard A. Wise, who then claimed the seat.

== Early life and career ==
Born in Norfolk, Virginia, Young attended public schools and St. Mary's Academy in Norfolk. He studied law, but abandoned it before obtaining a license and devoted himself to mercantile pursuits. He subsequently served as clerk of the circuit and corporation courts of the city of Norfolk for six years.

== Politics and later life ==
In 1892, Young served as delegate to the Democratic National Convention. He was the Democratic candidate for the 1896 election to the U.S. House of Representatives for the second district. Having won the election, Young presented credentials as a member-elect to the Fifty-fifth Congress and served from March 4, 1897, to April 26, 1898. Young was succeeded by Richard A. Wise, who successfully contested the election and took over the seat.

Young stood for election again in 1898, and again appeared to win the election. Accordingly, he presented credentials as a member-elect to the Fifty-sixth Congress. Young served from March 4, 1899, to March 12, 1900, when he was again succeeded by Richard A. Wise, who successfully contested the 1898 election as well.

Young engaged in the real estate business at Norfolk, where he died March 12, 1928. He was interred in St. Mary's Cemetery.

== Sources ==
- United States Congress. "William Albin Young (id: Y000056)". Biographical Directory of the United States Congress.

U.S. House of Representatives
| Preceded by D. Gardiner Tyler | Member of the U.S. House of Representatives from Virginia's 2nd congressional district 1897–1898 | Succeeded by Richard A. Wise |
| Preceded by Richard A. Wise | Member of the U.S. House of Representatives from Virginia's 2nd congressional district 1899–1900 | Succeeded by Richard A. Wise |
