= Capell L. Weems =

American politician

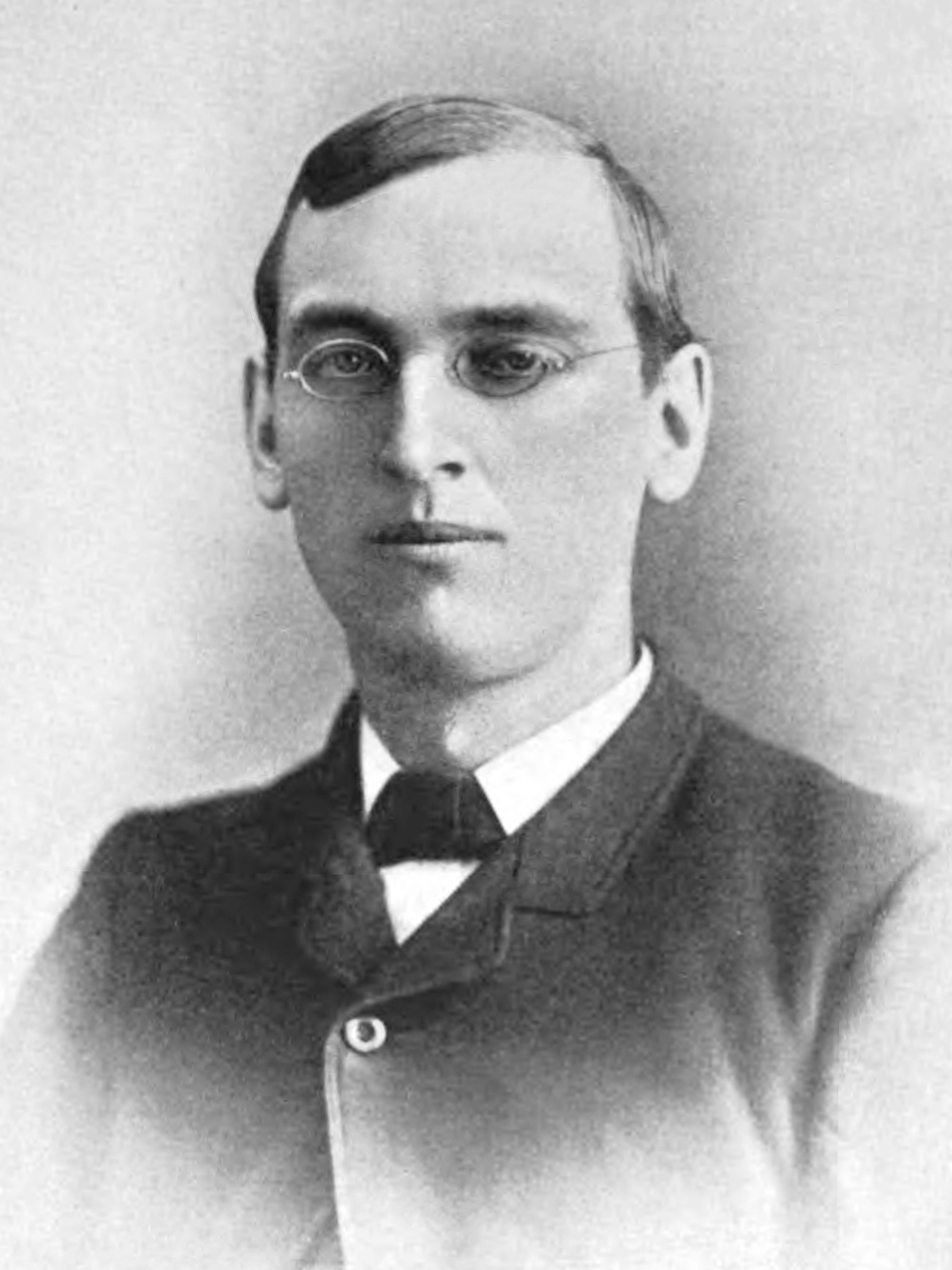

Member of the U.S. House of Representatives from Ohio's 16th district
- In office November 3, 1903 – March 3, 1909
- Preceded by: Joseph J. Gill
- Succeeded by: David Hollingsworth

Member of the Ohio House of Representatives from the Noble County district
- In office January 2, 1888 – January 5, 1890
- Preceded by: Thomas C. Williams
- Succeeded by: Chris McKee

Personal details
- Born: Capell Lane Weems; July 7, 1860 Whigville, Ohio, U.S.
- Died: January 5, 1913 (aged 52) Steubenville, Ohio, U.S.
- Resting place: Union Cemetery, St. Clairsville
- Party: Republican
- Spouse: Mary B. Nay
- Children: three

Capell Lane Weems (July 7, 1860 – January 5, 1913) was an American lawyer and politician who served three terms as a U.S. representative from Ohio from 1903 to 1909.

== Biography ==
Born in Whigville, Ohio, Weems attended the common schools and normal academy, Caldwell, Ohio. He studied law, was admitted to the bar in 1883 and commenced practice in Caldwell.

=== Early career ===
Weems was elected prosecuting attorney of Noble County in 1884. He served as member of the Ohio House of Representatives in 1888 and 1889. He moved to St. Clairsville, Ohio, in 1890 and served as prosecuting attorney of Belmont County 1890-1896.

=== Congress ===
Weems was elected as a Republican to the Fifty-eighth Congress to fill the vacancy caused by the resignation of Joseph J. Gill. He was reelected to the Fifty-ninth and Sixtieth Congresses and served from November 3, 1903, to March 3, 1909. He resumed the practice of law and was solicitor for the Pennsylvania Railroad.

=== Death and burial ===
He died in Steubenville, Ohio, January 5, 1913. He was interred in Union Cemetery, St. Clairsville, Ohio.

=== Family ===
Weems married Mary B. Nay of West Virginia on November 6, 1883. They had children named Chester N., Milton M., and Lillian A.

U.S. House of Representatives
Preceded by Joseph J. Gill	Member of the U.S. House of Representatives from Ohio's 17th congressional district November 3, 1903 - March 3, 1909	Succeeded by David Hollingsworth
