= Harry L. Maynard =

American politician

Henry Maynard
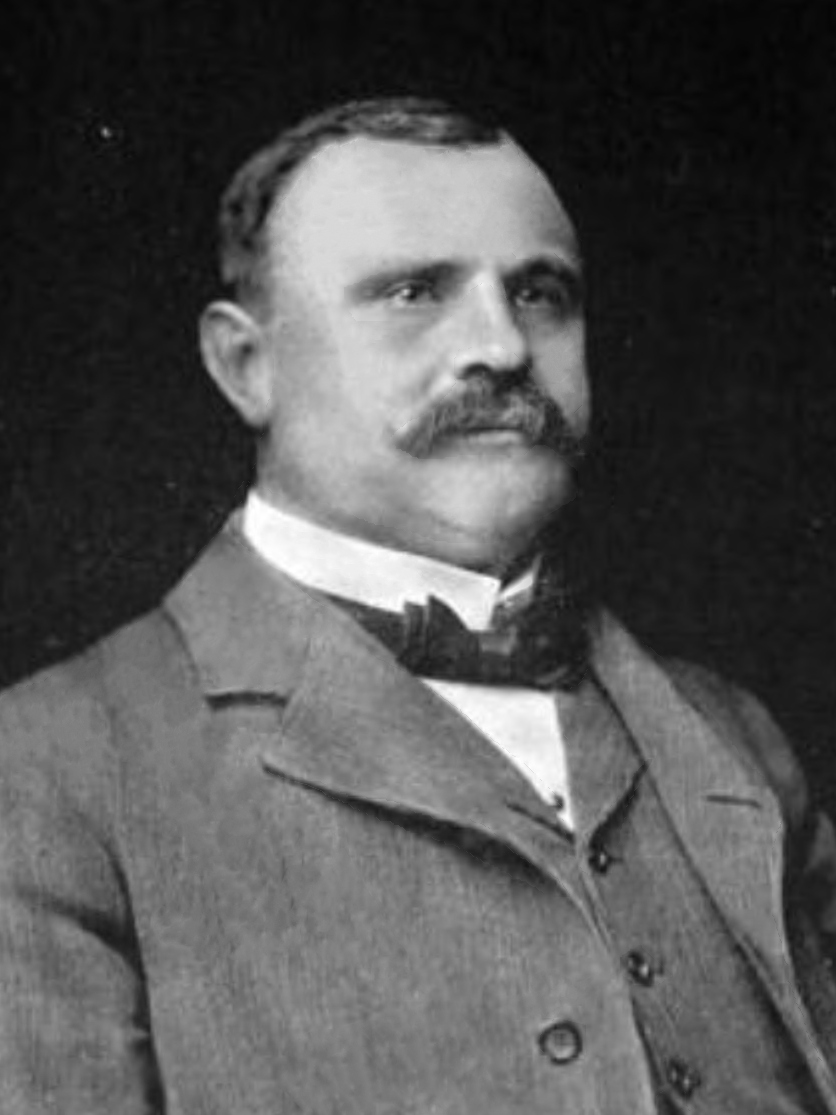

Member of the U.S. House of Representatives from Virginia's 2nd district
- In office March 4, 1901 – March 3, 1911
- Preceded by: Richard A. Wise
- Succeeded by: Edward E. Holland

Member of the Virginia Senate from the 33rd district
- In office December 6, 1893 – March 4, 1901
- Preceded by: Joseph T. Lawless
- Succeeded by: E. Finley Cromwell

Member of the Virginia House of Delegates from Portsmouth City
- In office December 4, 1889 – December 2, 1891
- Preceded by: R. L. Herbert
- Succeeded by: William A. Fentress

Personal details
- Born: Harry Lee Maynard; June 8, 1861 Portsmouth, Virginia
- Died: October 23, 1922 (aged 61) Fort Totten, New York
- Resting place: Portsmouth, Virginia
- Party: Democratic
- Education: Virginia Agricultural and Mechanical College
- Profession: Businessman in real estate and insurance

Harry Lee Maynard (June 8, 1861 – October 23, 1922) was an American businessman and politician who served five terms as a U.S. representative from Virginia from 1901 to 1911.

== Early life and education ==
Born in Portsmouth, Virginia, Maynard attended the common schools of Norfolk County. He was graduated from the Virginia Agricultural and Mechanical College at Blacksburg in 1880. He engaged in the real estate business and the promotion of public utilities.

== Political career ==
He served as member of the State house of delegates in 1889 and 1890. He served in the State senate from 1893 to 1901.

=== Congress ===
Maynard was elected as a Democrat to the Fifty-seventh and to the four succeeding Congresses (March 4, 1901 – March 3, 1911). He was an unsuccessful candidate for renomination in 1910.

== Later career and death ==
He moved to New York City and engaged in the insurance and real estate business.

He died in Fort Totten, New York, October 23, 1922. He was interred in Oak Grove Cemetery, Portsmouth, Virginia.

== Electoral history ==
- 1900; Maynard was elected to the U.S. House of Representatives defeating Republican Richard A. Wise, Socialist Labor James B. Flynn, and Labor C.C. Williams, winning 62.21% of the vote.
- 1902; Maynard was re-elected defeating Republican Robert M. Hughes and Socialists Lewis A. Hall and P.A. Wiggins, winning 75.94% of the vote.
- 1904; Maynard was re-elected defeating Republican Hughes, Socialist Lewis A. Hall, and Socialist Godfrey Kinder, winning 78.34% of the vote.
- 1906; Maynard was re-elected defeating Republican Floyd Hughes, winning 99.98% of the vote.
- 1908; Maynard was re-elected defeating Republican D.L. Groner and Socialist W.B. Muller, winning 70.3% of the vote.

== Sources ==
- United States Congress. "Harry L. Maynard (id: M000283)". Biographical Directory of the United States Congress.

U.S. House of Representatives
| Preceded by Richard A. Wise | Member of the U.S. House of Representatives from Virginia's 2nd congressional district 1901–1911 | Succeeded by Edward E. Holland |
