= Augustin Reed Humphrey =

American politician (1859–1937)

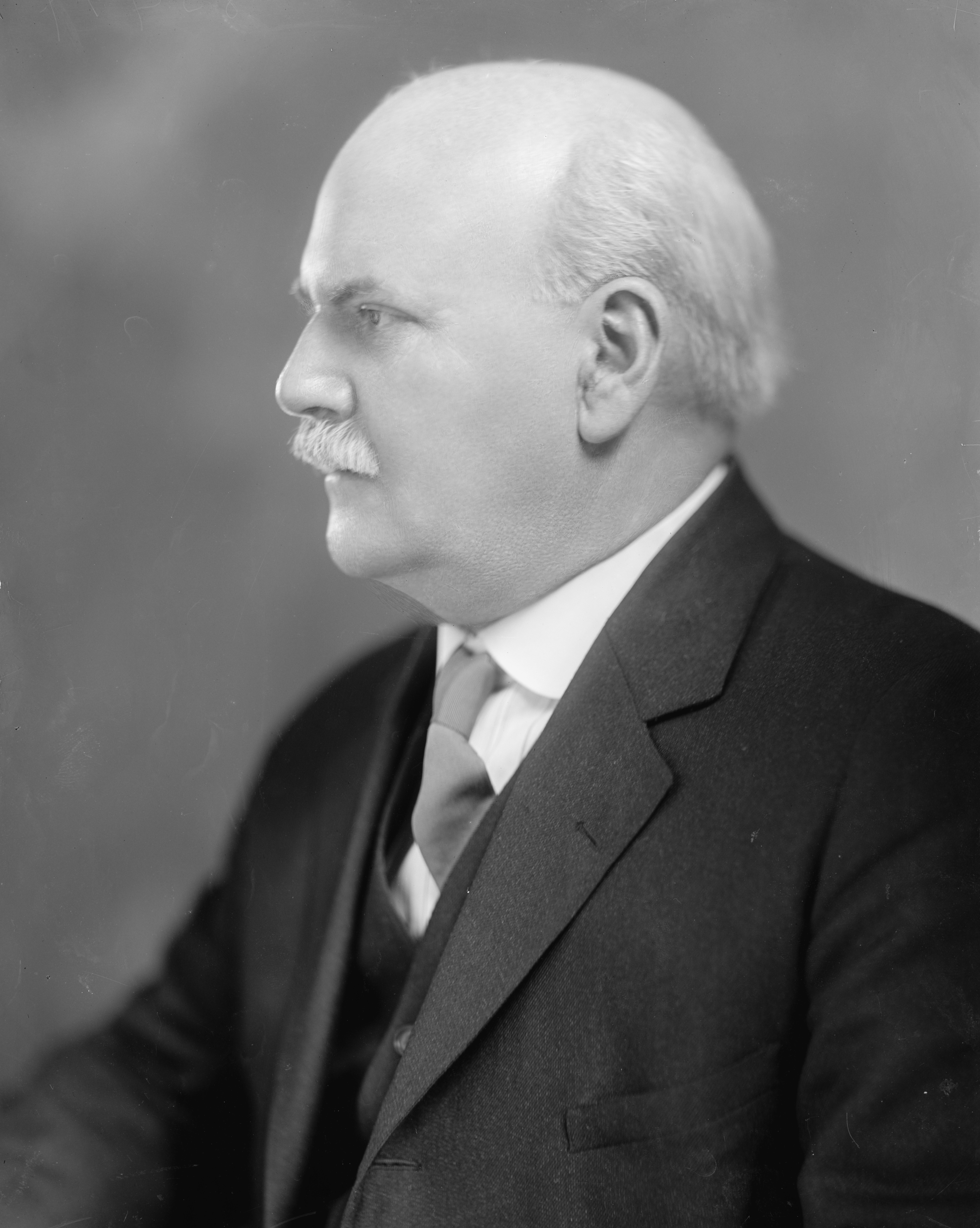

Member of the U.S. House of Representatives from Nebraska's 6th district
- In office November 7, 1922 – March 3, 1923
- Preceded by: Moses Kinkaid
- Succeeded by: Robert G. Simmons

Personal details
- Born: February 18, 1859 Madison, Indiana
- Died: December 10, 1937 (aged 78) Fort Collins, Colorado
- Party: Republican

Augustin Reed Humphrey (February 18, 1859 – December 10, 1937) was an American Republican Party politician.

Humphrey was born in 1859 near Madison, Indiana. He moved with his family to Drakesville, Iowa, in 1864. Humphrey graduated from the Southern Iowa Normal School at Bloomfield in 1881; and the law department of the University of Iowa in 1882. He passed the Bar in the same year. Humphrey started to practice law in Broken Bow, Nebraska in 1885, and received a homestead in Custer County, Nebraska in 1886, where he farmed and raised livestock.

Humphrey was a delegate to every Republican State convention from 1887 to 1936; and was the commissioner of public lands and buildings of Nebraska from 1891 to 1895. He was president of the Broken Bow board of education from 1898 to 1914. Humphrey was a probate judge from 1906 to 1910, and the mayor of Broken Bow from 1916 to 1917. Humphrey moved to a ranch on the South Loup River in 1920.

Humphrey was elected to the 67th Congress in 1922 to fill the vacancy caused by the death of long-standing representative, Moses Kinkaid. He served until March 3, 1923, not running for reelection.

Humphrey died on a trip to Fort Collins, Colorado in 1937, and is interred in the Broken Bow Cemetery.

U.S. House of Representatives
Preceded by Moses Kinkaid (R)	Member of the U.S. House of Representatives from Nebraska's 6th congressional district November 7, 1922 – March 3, 1923	Succeeded by Robert G. Simmons (R)
