= George W. E. Dorsey =

American politician

George Washington Emery Dorsey
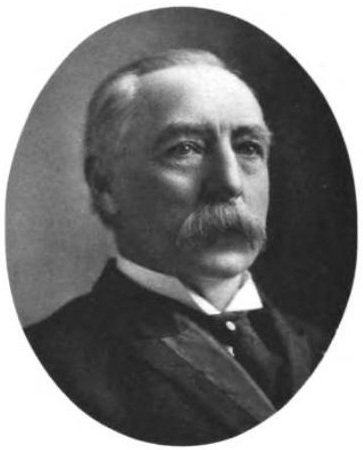
- From 1904's Nebraskans, 1854 to 1904, published by the Omaha Bee

Member of the U.S. House of Representatives from Nebraska's 3rd district
- In office March 4, 1885 – March 3, 1891
- Preceded by: Edward K. Valentine
- Succeeded by: Omer Madison Kem

Personal details
- Born: January 25, 1842 Loudoun County, Virginia
- Died: June 12, 1911 (aged 69) Salt Lake City, Utah
- Party: Republican

Military service
- Branch/service: Union Army
- Years of service: 1861–1865
- Rank: Major
- Unit: 6th West Virginia Infantry Regiment
- Battles/wars: American Civil War

George Washington Emery Dorsey (January 25, 1842 – June 12, 1911) was a U.S. representative from Nebraska.

== Biography ==
Dorsey was born in Loudoun County, Virginia, and moved with his parents to Preston County, Virginia (now West Virginia), in 1856. He attended private schools and Oak Hill Academy.

During the American Civil War, he recruited a volunteer company and entered the Union Army in August 1861 as a first lieutenant in the 6th Regiment West Virginia Infantry. He was subsequently promoted to captain and major for meritorious service and was mustered out with the Army of the Shenandoah in August 1865.

Dorsey moved to Nebraska in 1866 and studied law. He was admitted to the bar and commenced practice in 1869. He engaged in banking and served as vice president of the State board of agriculture. He was chairman of the Republican State central committee and was elected as a Republican to the Forty-ninth, Fiftieth, and Fifty-first Congresses (March 4, 1885 – March 3, 1891). He served as chairman of the Committee on Banking and Currency (Fifty-first Congress) and was an unsuccessful candidate for reelection in 1890 to the Fifty-second Congress. He engaged in mining enterprises in Nevada and Utah.

Dorsey died in Salt Lake City, Utah, and was buried in the City Cemetery, Fremont, Nebraska.

== See also ==
U.S. House of Representatives
Preceded by Edward K. Valentine	Member of the U.S. House of Representatives from Nebraska's 3rd congressional district March 4, 1885 – March 3, 1891	Succeeded by Omer Madison Kem
