= Kinkaider Brewing Company =

- Location: Broken Bow, Nebraska, Nebraska, United States
- Coordinates: 41.423486°N 99.661736°W
- Opened: 2014
- Website: kinkaiderbrewing.com

Active beers
| Name | Type |
| 4-County | Pale Ale |
| Dan Wiser | Kölsch |
| Devil's Gap | Jalapeño Ale |
| Frame the Butcher | India Pale Ale |
| Herdlaw | Honey Wheat Ale |
| Hiram's Bones | Porter |

Seasonal beers
| Name | Type |
| Snow Beast | Winter Ale |

Kinkaider Brewing Company is a microbrewery based in Broken Bow in the U.S. state of Nebraska. It was founded in 2014. The brewery uses locally grown pumpkins, corn, hops, and jalapeños in its small-batch, hand-crafted beers.

== Name ==
The name of the brewery came from the Kinkaid Act of 1904, whereunder one section (1 mi², 2.6 km², 640 acres) of federal land in Nebraska could be acquired free of charge, apart from a modest $14 filing fee. The act was sponsored by U.S. congressman Moses Kinkaid, in an attempt to increase settlement in the northwestern portion of his state. The settlers became known as "Kinkaiders."

== History ==
The brewery got its start as a home-brew club in 2006, when Nate Bell and Dan Hodges decided that their beers were better than some of the commercially available brews. The pair stated looking for a location for microbrewery; pumpkin farmer Barry Fox provided one, and the brewery opened in December 2014. During the first year in business, they brewed thirty different beers and one root beer. The brewery also started to barrel age specialty beers in whiskey barrels and white wine barrels.

In February 2017, Kinkaider announced that it would open a tap room in downtown Grand Island, Nebraska the second location for the brewery.

== Availability ==
Kinkaider beers are available throughout Nebraska, in over 200 stores.
