= Richard Alsop Wise =

American politician (1843–1900)

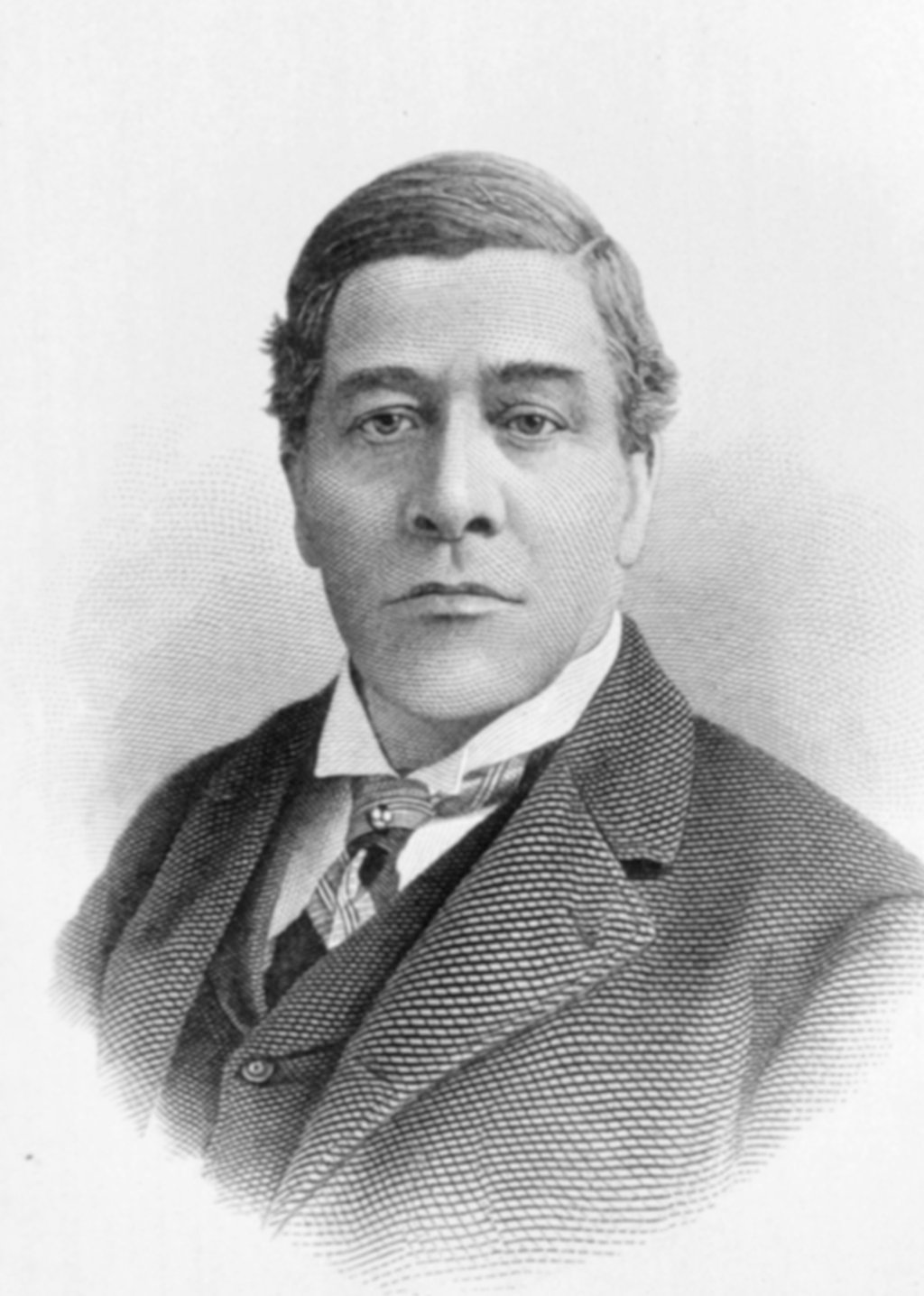

Member of the U.S. House of Representatives from Virginia's 2nd district
- In office March 12, 1900 – December 21, 1900
- Preceded by: William A. Young
- Succeeded by: Harry L. Maynard
- In office April 26, 1898 – March 3, 1899
- Preceded by: William A. Young
- Succeeded by: William A. Young

Member of the Virginia House of Delegates from the Elizabeth City, Warwick, James City, and York district
- In office December 2, 1885 – December 8, 1887
- Preceded by: Robert G. Griffin
- Succeeded by: John H. Robinson

Personal details
- Born: September 2, 1843 Philadelphia, Pennsylvania
- Died: December 21, 1900 (aged 57) Williamsburg, Virginia
- Resting place: Hollywood Cemetery, Richmond, Virginia
- Party: Republican
- Education: College of William and Mary; Medical College of Virginia
- Profession: civil servant, professor, physician

Military service
- Allegiance: Confederate States
- Branch/service: Confederate States Army
- Unit: Army of Northern Virginia; Wise's Brigade of Infantry, Stuart's Cavalry Corps
- Battles/wars: American Civil War

Richard Alsop Wise (September 2, 1843 – December 21, 1900) was an educator and politician from Virginia. He was a U.S. representative for parts of two terms. He was a son of Henry Alexander Wise, grandson of John Sergeant, brother of John Sergeant Wise, and cousin of George Douglas Wise, all U.S. representatives.

== Biography ==
=== Early life ===
He was born in Philadelphia, Pennsylvania, the son of future Governor of Virginia Henry A. Wise and Sarah Sergeant, daughter of U.S. Representative John Sergeant. He attended private schools in Richmond, Virginia, Harrison's Academy in Albemarle County, Virginia, and then the College of William and Mary for two years, until the American Civil War began.

=== Civil War ===
During the war, he served in the Confederate States Army, first as a private in Stuart's cavalry, and then as an aide to his father, who was a brigadier general. Officially he was Assistant Inspector General of Wise's Brigade, in the Army of Northern Virginia.

=== Medical career ===
He graduated in medicine from the Medical College of Virginia in 1867 and practiced that profession for a few years.

In 1869, he returned to William and Mary as Professor of Chemistry, and taught there until 1881. From 1882 to 1885 he was Superintendent of the Eastern Lunatic Asylum of Virginia.

In 1871 he helped reorganize a volunteer militia for the city of Williamsburg and James City County, Virginia, which he commanded. Known as the Wise Light Infantry, the unit continued at least through 1885, when it appeared during the inaugural festivities of President Grover Cleveland in Washington.

== Political career ==
Despite his Confederate background, Richard Wise became a Republican. He was a delegate to every Republican state convention in Virginia from 1879 to 1900. He was a delegate to the Republican National Conventions of 1892, 1896, and 1900.

He also held many political offices. He was a member of the Virginia House of Delegates in 1885–1887.

He was Clerk of the Circuit and County Courts of the city of Williamsburg and James City County in 1888–1894.

In 1896, Wise ran for U.S. Representative, but lost to Democrat William A. Young. Wise successfully contested the election result, and served in the Fifty-fifth Congress from April 26, 1898, to March 3, 1899.

This result was repeated in 1898; Wise served in the Fifty-sixth Congress from March 12, 1900, until his death in Williamsburg on December 21, 1900. He was interred in Hollywood Cemetery, Richmond, Virginia.

== Electoral history ==
- 1896 Wise was defeated in his bid for election to the U.S. House of Representatives by Democrat William Albin Young. However, Wise contested the election result. The House upheld his appeal and Wise was seated. He won a special election unopposed.
- 1898: Wise was defeated for re-election by Democrat Young. He again contested the election result, was again seated by the House, and again won a special election unopposed.

== See also ==
- List of members of the United States Congress who died in office (1900–1949)

== Sources ==
- United States Congress. "Richard Alsop Wise (id: W000653)". Biographical Directory of the United States Congress.
- http://babel.hathitrust.org/cgi/pt?id=uva.x004788346;view=1up;seq=11 Memorial addresses on the life and character of Richard Alsop Wise, late a representative from Virginia delivered in the House of Representatives and Senate frontispiece 1901

U.S. House of Representatives
Preceded by William A. Young	Member of the U.S. House of Representatives from Virginia's 2nd congressional district 1898–1899	Succeeded by William A. Young
Preceded by William A. Young	Member of the U.S. House of Representatives from Virginia's 2nd congressional district 1900	Succeeded by Harry L. Maynard
