= Old Nebraska State Bank Building =

- U.S. National Register of Historic Places
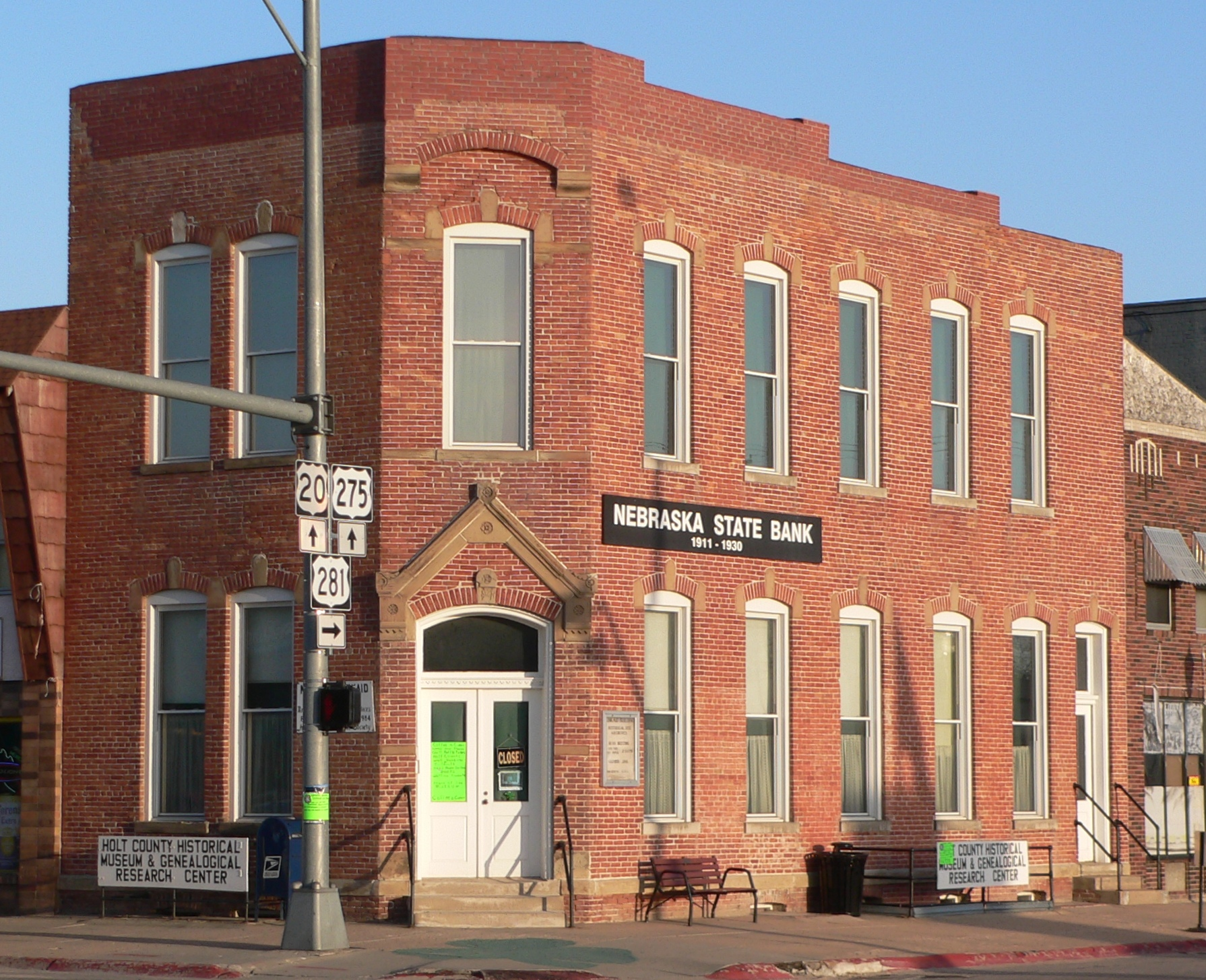

- Location within Nebraska Location within the United States
- Location: Douglas and 4th Sts., O'Neill, Nebraska
- Coordinates: 42°27′26″N 98°38′49″W
- Area: 0.3 acres (0.12 ha)
- Built: 1882-83
- NRHP reference No.: 74001120
- Added to NRHP: October 1, 1974

The Old Nebraska State Bank Building, located at Douglas and 4th Sts. in O'Neill, Nebraska, was built during 1882–1883. It has also been known as the Moses Kinkaid Building. It is believed to be the first brick building in O'Neill, and to have been largely designed and built by Moses P. Kinkaid, who took law offices on the second floor and who was a vice-president of the new bank itself; he later served as its president.

The building was listed on the National Register of Historic Places in 1974.
