= Nebraska's 6th congressional district =

1893–1933 US congressional district

- Obsolete district
- Created: 1890
- Eliminated: 1930
- Years active: 1893-1933

Nebraska's 6th congressional district is an obsolete district. It was created after the 1890 census and abolished after the 1930 census.

== List of members representing the district ==
Member	Party	Years of service	Cong ress	Electoral history
District established March 4, 1893
Omer M. Kem (Broken Bow)	Populist	March 4, 1893 – March 3, 1897	53rd 54th	Redistricted from the 3rd district and re-elected in 1892. Re-elected in 1894. Retired.
William L. Greene (Kearney)	Populist	March 4, 1897 – March 11, 1899	55th 56th	Elected in 1896. Re-elected in 1898. Died.
Vacant		March 11, 1899 – November 7, 1899	56th	
William Neville (North Platte)	Populist	November 7, 1899 – March 3, 1903	56th 57th	Elected to finish Greene's term. Re-elected in 1900. Retired.
Moses Kinkaid (O'Neill)	Republican	March 4, 1903 – July 6, 1922	58th 59th 60th 61st 62nd 63rd 64th 65th 66th 67th	Elected in 1902. Re-elected in 1904. Re-elected in 1906. Re-elected in 1908. Re-elected in 1910. Re-elected in 1912. Re-elected in 1914. Re-elected in 1916. Re-elected in 1918. Re-elected in 1920. Died.
Vacant		July 6, 1922 – November 7, 1922	67th	
Augustin R. Humphrey (Broken Bow)	Republican	November 7, 1922 – March 3, 1923	67th	Elected to finish Kinkaid's term. Retired.
Robert G. Simmons (Scottsbluff)	Republican	March 4, 1923 – March 3, 1933	68th 69th 70th 71st 72nd	Elected in 1922. Re-elected in 1924. Re-elected in 1926. Re-elected in 1928. Re-elected in 1930. Redistricted to the 5th district and lost re-election.
District eliminated March 4, 1933
