= Omer M. Kem =

American politician

Omer Madison Kem
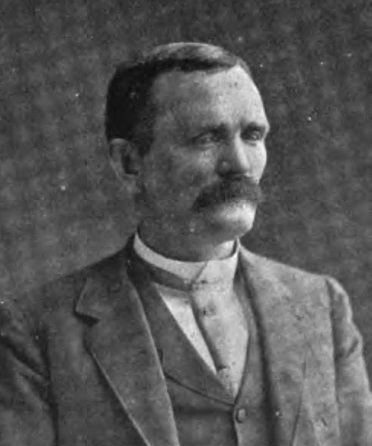
- From 1896's An Illustrated Congressional Manual: The United States Red Book

Member of the U.S. House of Representatives from Nebraska
- In office March 4, 1891 – March 3, 1897
- Preceded by: George W. E. Dorsey (3rd); District established (6th)
- Succeeded by: George de Rue Meiklejohn (3rd); William L. Greene (6th)
- Constituency: 3rd district (1891-93); 6th district (1893-97)

Personal details
- Born: November 13, 1855 Hagerstown, Indiana
- Died: February 13, 1942 (aged 86) Cottage Grove, Oregon
- Party: Populist
- Spouses: Nancy Lenore Benson (m. 1874; died 1883) Alice Maria Lockheart (m. 1885)
- Children: 8

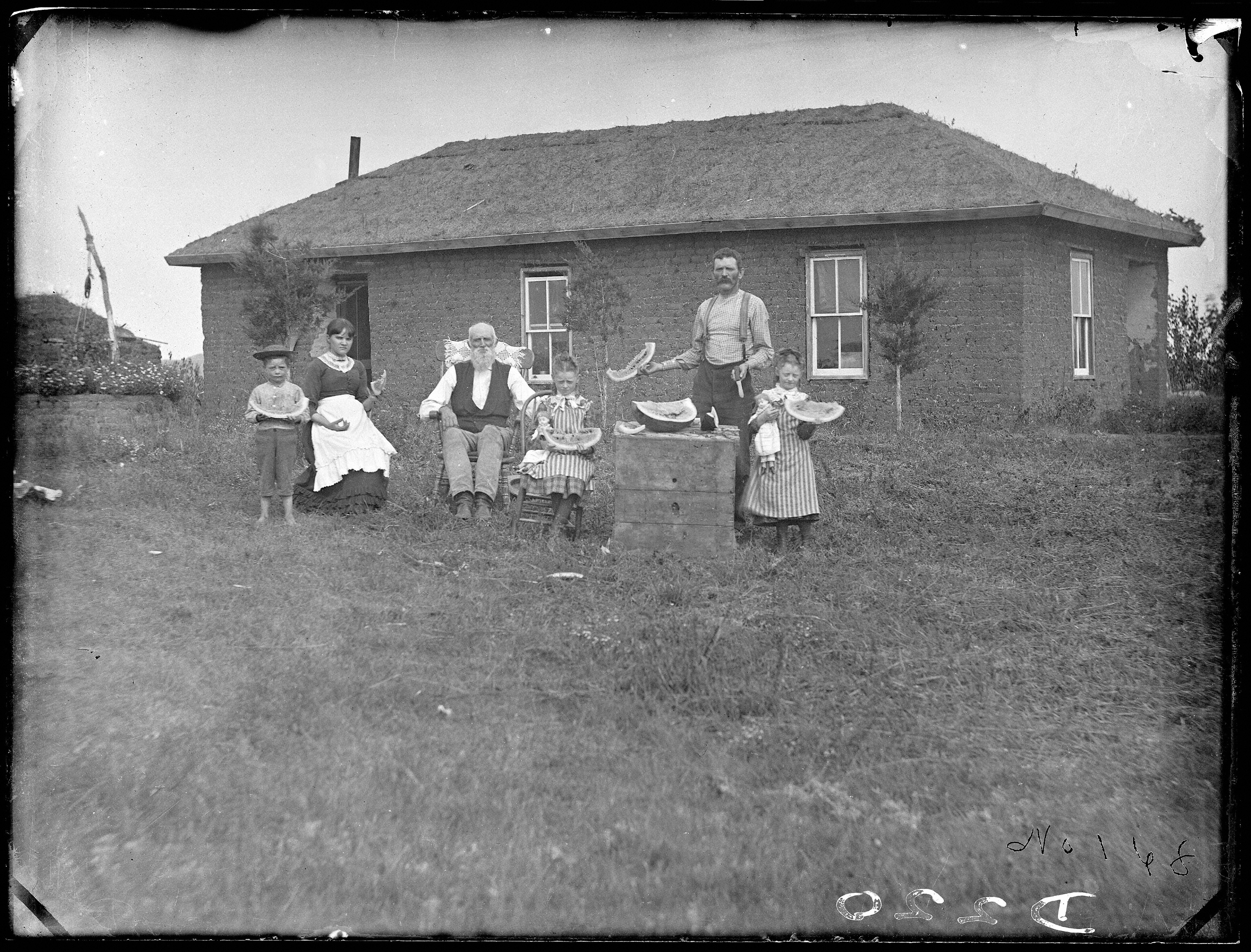
Omer Kem and his family in front of his sod house in Nebraska (1886)

Omer Madison Kem (November 13, 1855 – February 13, 1942) was an American Populist Party politician.

== Early life ==
Omer Madison Kem was born in Hagerstown, Indiana on November 13, 1855.

== Career ==
He moved to Custer County, Nebraska in 1882 and to Broken Bow, Nebraska in 1890 where he farmed. He was deputy treasurer of Custer County from 1890 to 1891. He was elected as a Populist to the United States House of Representatives from 1891 to 1897, serving first the 3rd district and then the 6th district when the number of representatives from Nebraska was increased following the 1890 national census. He did not run for reelection in 1896.

Kem went to Montrose, Colorado, to grow fruit and raise cattle. While out of office, he led the campaign to appropriate public land for the Gunnison Tunnel, which was approved by Congress in 1902. He was elected to the Colorado House of Representatives in 1907. He then moved to Cottage Grove, Oregon, in 1908, where he became interested in electric light and power enterprises. He worked and served as president of the Cottage Grove Electric Company until it was sold to Mountain States Power (now PacifiCorp) in 1922. He retired in 1922.

While his term in the United States House had been dominated by Populist economic issues, during the second half of his life, Kem increasingly advocated for racial segregation and eugenics. He supported the involuntary sterilization of criminals.

== Personal life ==
Kem married Nancy Lenore Benson in 1874. She died in 1883. He married Alice Maria Lockheart in Nebraska in 1885. He had five daughters and three sons (Claude, Huxley, and Victor).

Kem was a lifelong atheist and condemned Christianity for its opposition to eugenics. However, he practiced spiritualism, which was common in Midwest Populist circles. During his term in the House and afterwards, he took credit for spiritual healing through a spirit guide which he described as an American Indian named "Fleet Wind".

Kem wrote a twelve-volume autobiography, eleven volumes of which are stored at Creighton University in Nebraska. The twelfth volume, entitled "Spiritualist Notes," is in a private collection.

== Death ==
Kem died in Cottage Grove on February 13, 1942. He was cremated and the ashes scattered.

U.S. House of Representatives
Preceded by George W. E. Dorsey (R)	Member of the U.S. House of Representatives from Nebraska's 3rd congressional district 1891 – 1893	Succeeded by George de Rue Meiklejohn (R)
Preceded by Seat created	Member of the U.S. House of Representatives from Nebraska's 6th congressional district 1893 – 1897	Succeeded by William Laury Greene (P)
