= Louis B. Goodall =

American politician

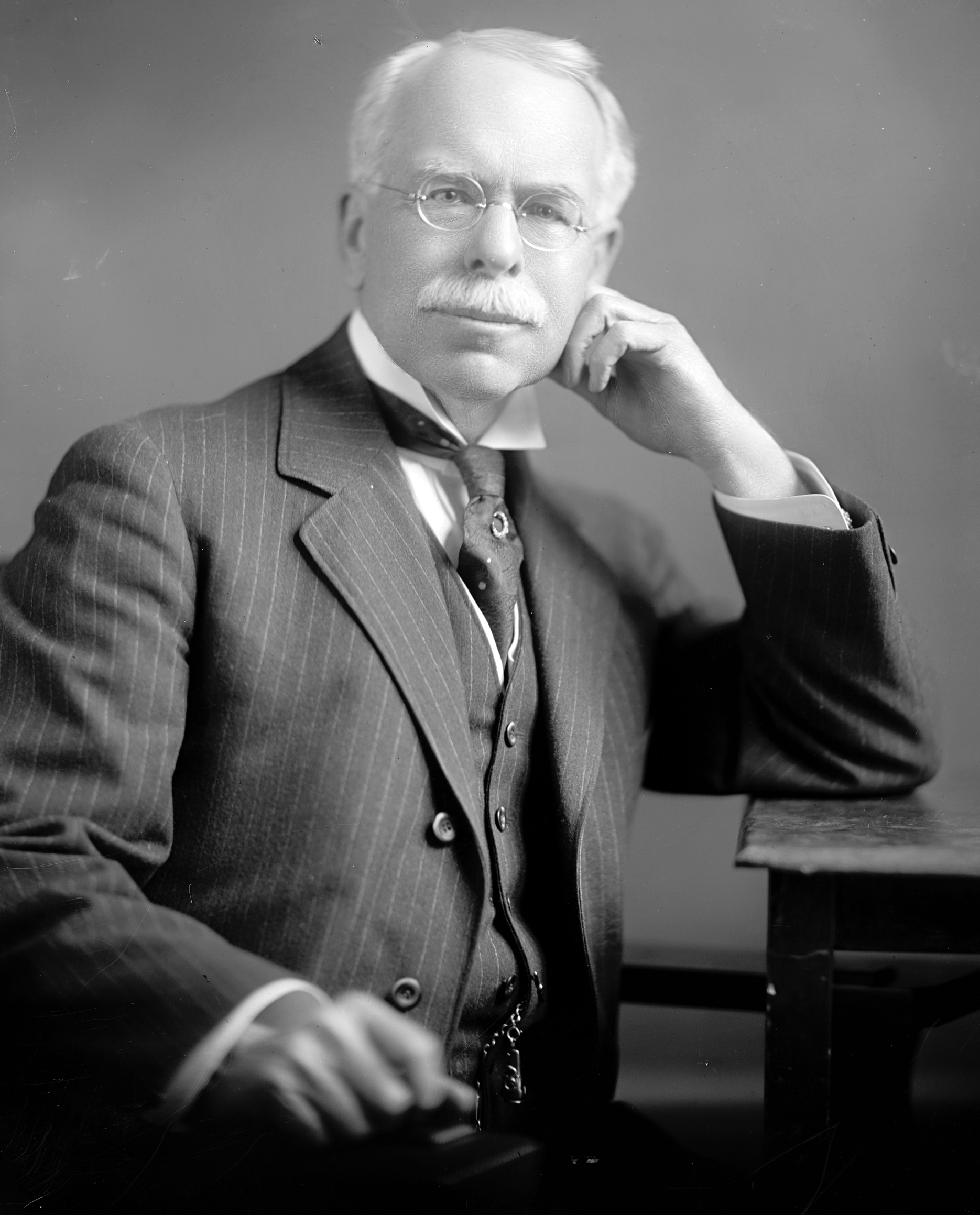

Member of the U.S. House of Representatives from Maine's 1st district
- In office March 4, 1917 – March 3, 1921
- Preceded by: Asher Hinds
- Succeeded by: Carroll L. Beedy

Personal details
- Born: Louis Bertrand Goodall; September 23, 1851 Winchester, New Hampshire, U.S.
- Died: June 26, 1935 (aged 82) Sanford, Maine, U.S.
- Resting place: Oakdale Cemetery
- Party: Republican

Louis Bertrand Goodall (September 23, 1851 in Winchester, New Hampshire – June 26, 1935 in Sanford, Maine) was an American businessman and politician who served two terms as a United States representative from Maine from 1917 to 1921.

== Biography ==
He moved to Troy, New Hampshire with his parents in 1852. He attended the common schools of Troy, then attended a private school in Thompson, Connecticut, the Vermont Episcopal Institute, a private school in England, and the Kimball Union Academy.

=== Business career ===
He entered his father's mills at Sanford, Maine in 1874 and afterward engaged extensively in the wool-manufacturing industry and in the railroad business. He established the Goodall Worsted Co., which originated Palm Beach cloth.

He became president of the Sanford National Bank from its organization in 1896, and became chairman of the Maine commission to the Louisiana Purchase Exposition, St. Louis, Mo., in 1904.

=== Congress ===
He was elected as a Republican to the Sixty-fifth and Sixty-sixth Congresses (March 4, 1917 – March 3, 1921). He was elected chairman of the Committee on Elections No. 2 (Sixty-sixth Congress).

=== Retirement and death ===
He was not a candidate for renomination in 1920. He resumed manufacturing interests and banking in Sanford, Maine, until his death there.

His interment was in Oakdale Cemetery.

U.S. House of Representatives
Preceded by Asher C. Hinds	Member of the U.S. House of Representatives from Maine's 1st congressional district March 4, 1917 – March 3, 1921	Succeeded by Carroll L. Beedy
