= Joseph J. Gill =

American politician

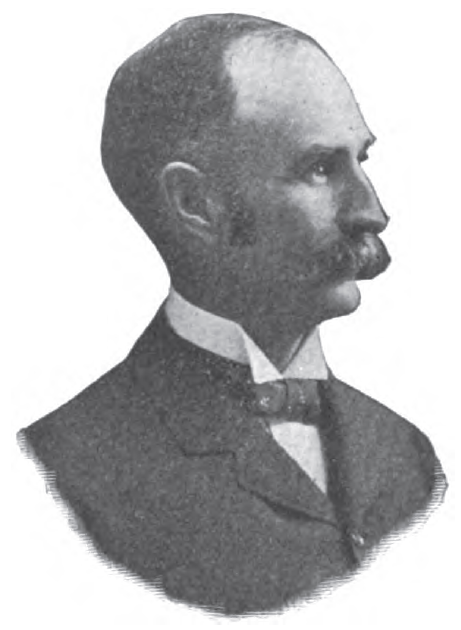

Member of the U.S. House of Representatives from Ohio's 16th district
- In office December 4, 1899 – October 31, 1903
- Preceded by: Lorenzo Danford
- Succeeded by: Capell L. Weems

Personal details
- Born: Joseph John Gill; September 21, 1846 Barnesville, Ohio, U.S.
- Died: May 22, 1920 (aged 73) Steubenville, Ohio, U.S.
- Resting place: Union Cemetery
- Party: Republican
- Education: University of Michigan Law School

Joseph John Gill (September 21, 1846 – May 22, 1920) was an American lawyer, businessman and politician who served two terms as a U.S. representative from Ohio from 1899 to 1903.

== Biography ==
Born in Barnesville, Ohio, Gill moved with his parents to Mount Pleasant, Ohio, in 1848. He pursued an academic course and was graduated from the law department of the University of Michigan at Ann Arbor in 1868. He was admitted to the bar and commenced practice in Jefferson County, Ohio. He subsequently engaged in banking and later in manufacturing and iron mining.

=== Congress ===
Gill was elected as a Republican to the Fifty-sixth Congress to fill the vacancy caused by the death of Lorenzo Danford. He was reelected to the Fifty-seventh and Fifty-eighth Congresses and served from December 4, 1899, until October 31, 1903, when he resigned.

=== Death ===
He died in Steubenville, Ohio, May 22, 1920. He was interred in Union Cemetery.

== Sources ==
- United States Congress. "Joseph J. Gill (id: G000189)". Biographical Directory of the United States Congress.

U.S. House of Representatives
Preceded by Lorenzo Danford	Member of the U.S. House of Representatives from Ohio's 17th congressional district December 4, 1899 - October 31, 1903	Succeeded by Capell L. Weems
