= Asher Hinds =

American politician

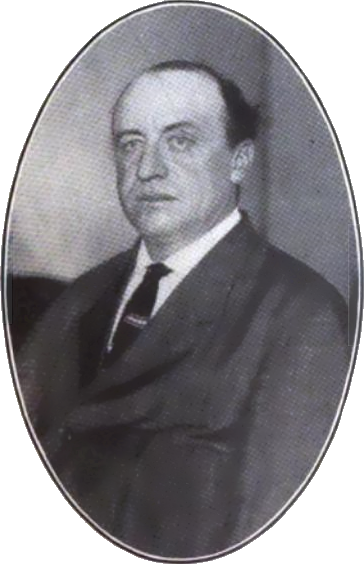

Member of the U.S. House of Representatives from Maine's 1st district
- In office March 4, 1911 – March 3, 1917
- Preceded by: Amos L. Allen
- Succeeded by: Louis B. Goodall

Personal details
- Born: Asher Crosby Hinds; February 6, 1863 Benton, Maine
- Died: May 1, 1919 (aged 56) Washington, D.C.
- Resting place: Evergreen Cemetery in Portland, Maine
- Party: Republican
- Spouse: Harriett Louise Estey (m. 1891)
- Education: Coburn Classical Institute; Colby College
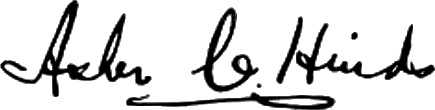
- Signature

Asher Crosby Hinds (February 6, 1863 – May 1, 1919) was an American newspaperman and politician who served three terms as a United States representative from Maine from 1911 to 1917.

== Early life and career ==
Asher Hinds was born in Benton, Maine on February 6, 1863. He attended the public schools and Coburn Classical Institute.

Hinds graduated from Colby College in 1883, then began newspaper work in Portland in 1884. He was appointed as a clerk to the Speaker of the United States House of Representatives from 1889 to 1891. He then became clerk at the Speaker's table from 1895 to 1911.

He married Harriett Louise Estey on September 3, 1891, and they had two children.

He was editor of the Rules, Manual, and Digest of the House of Representatives in 1899 and of Hinds' Precedents of the House of Representatives 1908. According to a 2013 study, Hinds' Precedents successfully altered the behavior of House representatives, as they became less willing to appeal decisions of the chair.

== Congress ==
Hinds was elected as a Republican to the Sixty-second, Sixty-third, and Sixty-fourth Congresses (March 4, 1911 – March 3, 1917).

== Retirement and death ==
He resided in Washington, D.C., until his death on May 1, 1919. He is buried in Evergreen Cemetery in Portland, Maine.

== Publications ==
- Rules, Manual, and Digest of the House of Representatives (1899), editor
- Hinds' Precedents of the House of Representatives of the United States, Volumes I, II, III, IV, V (1907)
- The Canadian Agreement as Related to the Farm Home and Cost of Living in Cities (1911)
- Predaceous Fishes and Aquatic Animals (1914)

U.S. House of Representatives
Preceded by Amos L. Allen	Member of the U.S. House of Representatives from Maine's 1st congressional district March 4, 1911 – March 3, 1917	Succeeded by Louis B. Goodall
