= Lorenzo Danford =

American politician (1829–1899)

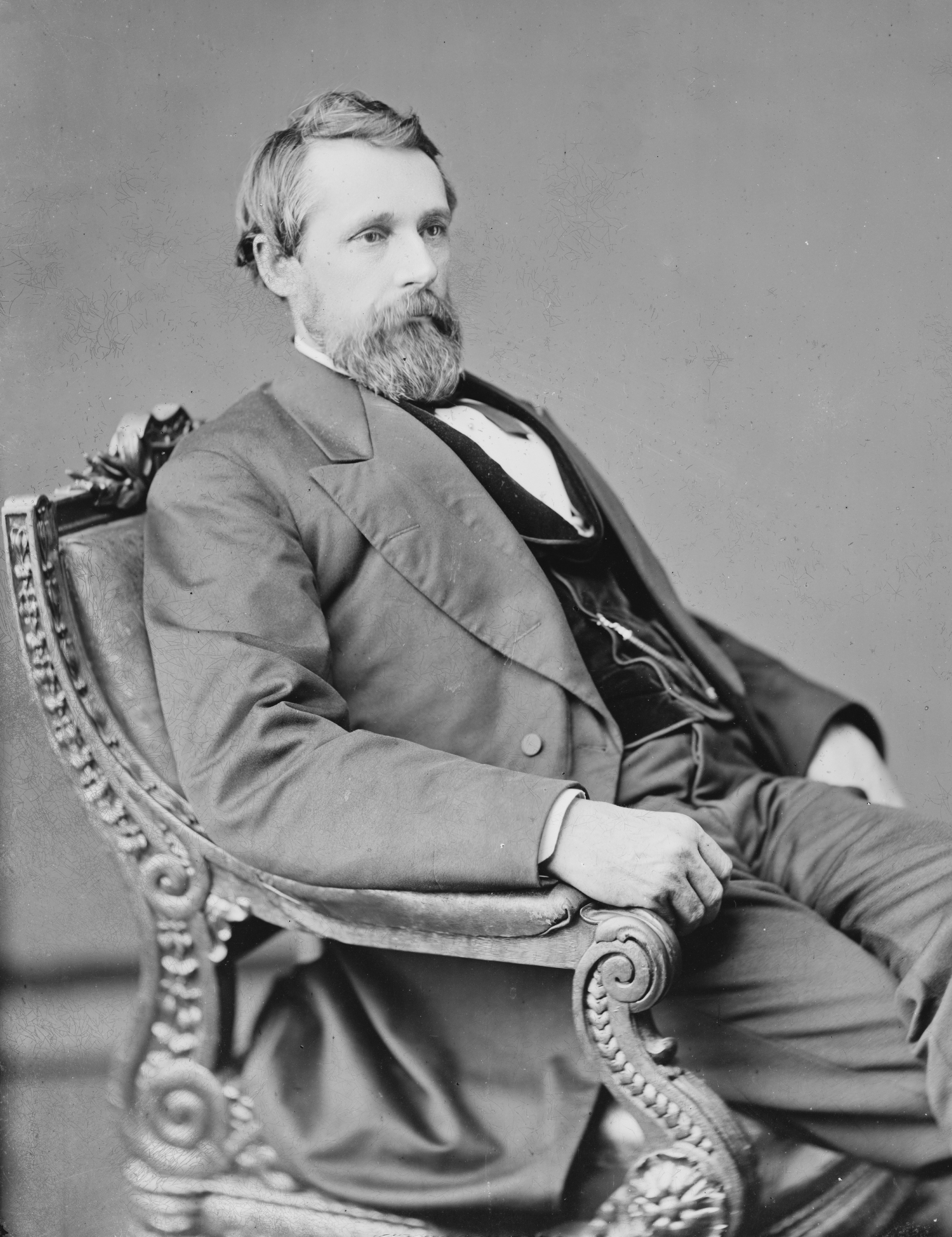

Member of the U.S. House of Representatives from Ohio's 16th district
- In office March 4, 1873 – March 3, 1879
- Preceded by: John Bingham
- Succeeded by: William McKinley
- In office March 4, 1895 – June 19, 1899
- Preceded by: Albert J. Pearson
- Succeeded by: Joseph J. Gill

Personal details
- Born: Lorenzo Dow Danford; October 18, 1829 Belmont County, Ohio, U.S.
- Died: June 19, 1899 (aged 69) St. Clairsville, Ohio, U.S.
- Resting place: Methodist Cemetery, St. Clairsville
- Party: Republican
- Spouse(s): Annie H. Cook; Mary Adams
- Education: Waynesburg University

Lorenzo Dow Danford (October 18, 1829 – June 19, 1899) was an American lawyer and politician who served five terms as a U.S. representative from Ohio from 1873 to 1879 and again from 1895 to 1899.

== Biography ==
Born in Washington Township, Belmont County, Ohio, Danford attended the common schools and a college at Waynesburg, Pennsylvania, for two years. He studied law. He was admitted to the bar at St. Clairsville, Belmont County, Ohio, in September 1854, and commenced practice there. He served as a presidential elector on the American Party ticket in 1856. He served as prosecuting attorney of Belmont County from 1857 to 1861, when he resigned to enlist in the Fifteenth Regiment, Ohio Volunteer Infantry, as a private. Commissioned a lieutenant and later a captain, he served until honourably discharged in August 1864. He resumed the practice of his profession in St. Clairsville.

Presidential elector for Lincoln/Johnson in 1864.

=== Congress ===
Danford was elected as a Republican to the Forty-third, Forty-fourth, and Forty-fifth Congresses (March 4, 1873 – March 3, 1879) representing Ohio's 16th Congressional District. He was not a candidate for renomination in 1878.

He resumed the practice of his profession.

Presidential elector in 1892 for Harrison/Reid.

Danford was elected to the Fifty-fourth, Fifty-fifth, and Fifty-sixth Congresses and served from March 4, 1895, until he died in St. Clairsville, Ohio, on June 19, 1899. He served as chairman of the Committee on Immigration and Naturalization during the Fifty-fifth Congress.

=== Death and burial ===
Lorenzo Danford died on June 19, 1899, was laid to rest in the Methodist Cemetery on Newell Avenue in St. Clairsville, Ohio, located behind the courthouse. His second wife, Mary (Adams) Danford, is buried beside him.

Mr. Danford was first married on October 7, 1858, to Annie H. Cook, of Jefferson County, Ohio, who died October 24, 1867. On October 27, 1870, he was married to Mary M. Adams, of St. Clairsville.

== See also ==
- List of members of the United States Congress who died in office (1790–1899)

== Sources ==
- United States Congress. "Lorenzo Danford (id: D000028)". Biographical Directory of the United States Congress.
- Smith, Joseph P, ed. (1898). History of the Republican Party in Ohio. Vol. I. Chicago: the Lewis Publishing Company.
- Taylor, William Alexander; Taylor, Aubrey Clarence (1899). Ohio statesmen and annals of progress: from the year 1788 to the year 1900 ... State of Ohio.

U.S. House of Representatives
Preceded by John Bingham	Member of the U.S. House of Representatives from Ohio's 16th congressional district 1873-1879	Succeeded by William McKinley
Preceded by Albert J. Pearson	Member of the U.S. House of Representatives from Ohio's 16th congressional district 1895-1899	Succeeded by Joseph J. Gill
