= June Ward Gayle =

American politician

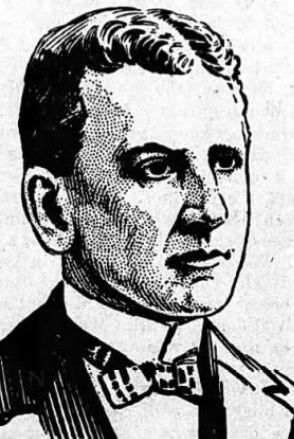

Member of the U.S. House of Representatives from Kentucky's 7th district
- In office January 15, 1900 – March 3, 1901
- Preceded by: Evan E. Settle
- Succeeded by: South Trimble

Personal details
- Born: February 22, 1865 New Liberty, Kentucky
- Died: August 5, 1942 (aged 77) Owenton, Kentucky
- Resting place: New Liberty Cemetery; New Liberty, Kentucky
- Party: Democratic
- Profession: Businessman

June Ward Gayle (February 22, 1865 – August 5, 1942) was a U.S. representative from Kentucky.

Born in New Liberty, Kentucky, Gayle attended Concord College, New Liberty, Kentucky, and Georgetown College, Georgetown, Kentucky. He served as member of the Democratic State central committee and of the State executive committee. Gayle served as Deputy sheriff of Owen County from 1892 to 1896. He was an unsuccessful candidate for State auditor in 1899. He engaged in banking and in the tobacco business.

Gayle was elected as a Democrat to the Fifty-sixth Congress to fill the vacancy caused by the death of Evan E. Settle and served from January 15, 1900, to March 3, 1901. He resumed his former business activities after his term in Congress. He died in Owenton, Kentucky, on August 5, 1942. He was interred in New Liberty Cemetery, New Liberty, Kentucky.

U.S. House of Representatives
Preceded by Evan E. Settle	Member of the U.S. House of Representatives from Kentucky's 7th congressional district 1900-1901	Succeeded by South Trimble
