= E. Finley Cromwell =

American politician (1855–1947)

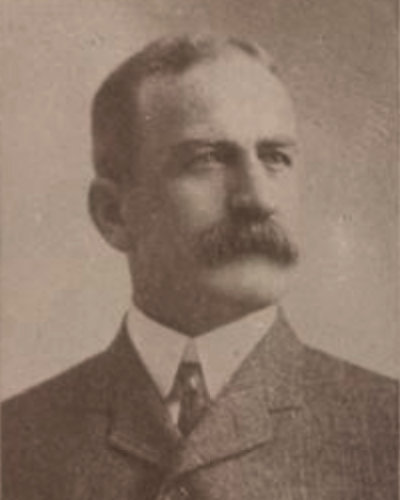

Member of the Virginia Senate from the 33rd district
- In office December 4, 1901 – January 10, 1906
- Preceded by: Harry L. Maynard
- Succeeded by: John C. Niemeyer

Member of the Virginia House of Delegates from Norfolk County
- In office January 30, 1900 – December 4, 1901
- Preceded by: M. S. Newberne
- Succeeded by: Charles T. Bland

Personal details
- Born: Ebenezer Finley Cromwell; July 3, 1855
- Died: April 21, 1947 (aged 91)
- Party: Democratic
- Spouse: Georgeanna McDade

Ebenezer Finley Cromwell (July 3, 1855 – April 21, 1947) was an American politician who served as a member of the Virginia Senate.

Senate of Virginia
Preceded by Harry L. Maynard	Virginia Senator for the 33rd District; 1901–1906	Succeeded by John C. Niemeyer
