= Moses Kinkaid =

American politician (1856–1922)

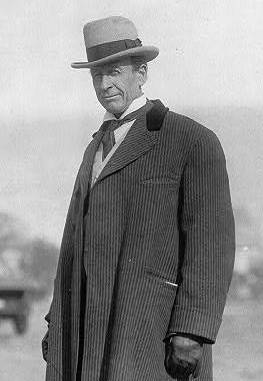
- Moses Kinkaid in 1911

Member of the U.S. House of Representatives from Nebraska's 6th district
- In office March 4, 1903 – July 6, 1922
- Preceded by: William Neville
- Succeeded by: Augustin Reed Humphrey

Personal details
- Born: January 24, 1856 Morgantown, Virginia
- Died: July 6, 1922 (aged 66) Washington, D.C.
- Party: Republican
- Education: University of Michigan

Moses Pierce Kinkaid (January 24, 1856 – July 6, 1922) was an American politician who was a member of the United States House of Representatives from the state of Nebraska. He was the sponsor of the 1904 Kinkaid Land Act, which allowed homesteaders to claim up to 640 acres (260 ha) of government land in western Nebraska.

== Early life and career ==
Kinkaid was born near Morgantown, Virginia, which is now in West Virginia. As a boy, he piloted Canada-bound fugitive slaves to his grandparents' home in Pennsylvania, where food, shelter, and aid were given to them. He attended the public schools and graduated from the law department of the University of Michigan at Ann Arbor in 1876. He was admitted to the bar and practiced in Henry County, Illinois, from 1876 until 1880 and in Pierre, Dakota Territory in 1880 and 1881. In 1881, he moved to O'Neill, Nebraska, where he maintained his residence until his death.

In O'Neill, Kinkaid continued to practice law. He also served as an officer of the Holt County Bank from its foundation in 1884 until 1886. He served in the state Senate in 1883, and as a district judge from 1887 to 1900.

In 1900, Kinkaid unsuccessfully sought election to the U.S. House of Representatives from Nebraska's Sixth District. In 1902, he ran for the same position, this time successfully.

== Kinkaid Act ==
The Sixth District contained most of the Nebraska Sandhills. This is a region of grass-stabilized sand dunes. Rainfall percolates readily into the sandy soil, recharging the aquifer and giving rise to hundreds of permanent lakes; but the sandy soil is poorly suited for cultivation, and the area is chiefly used for cattle ranching.

At the time that Kinkaid entered Congress, the 1862 Homestead Act allowed settlers to obtain a quarter-section (160 acres, or 65 ha) of government land for a nominal fee; the 1873 Timber Culture Act allowed them to claim an additional quarter-section. However, in much of the Sandhills, a half-section was not enough land to sustain a family. Instead, the pattern of development was one of large cattle ranches on federal land, with the ranchers using the homestead laws to secure lakes and streams for their operations.

In an effort to increase settlement in the northwestern portion of his state, Kinkaid sponsored and obtained passage of the Kinkaid Act, which amended the Homestead Act to enlarge the size of a homestead claim in certain arid regions of western Nebraska. Settlers on non-irrigable lands west of the 98th Meridian could claim up to 640 acres (260 ha). The measure was signed by President Theodore Roosevelt in 1904.

The Act had its intended effect: immigration into the Sandhills increased, with nearly nine million new acres (3,600,000 ha) claimed in Nebraska. By 1912, most of the land available had been claimed by "Kinkaiders". Attempts to farm the land thus obtained generally failed; but Kinkaid claims, together with regulations prohibiting fencing of federal land, led to the replacement of a few large ranches in the Sandhills with many smaller ones. The outcome of the Nebraska law led to the passage of the 1916 Stock-Raising Homestead Act, which extended many of the provisions of the Kinkaid act to other Western states.

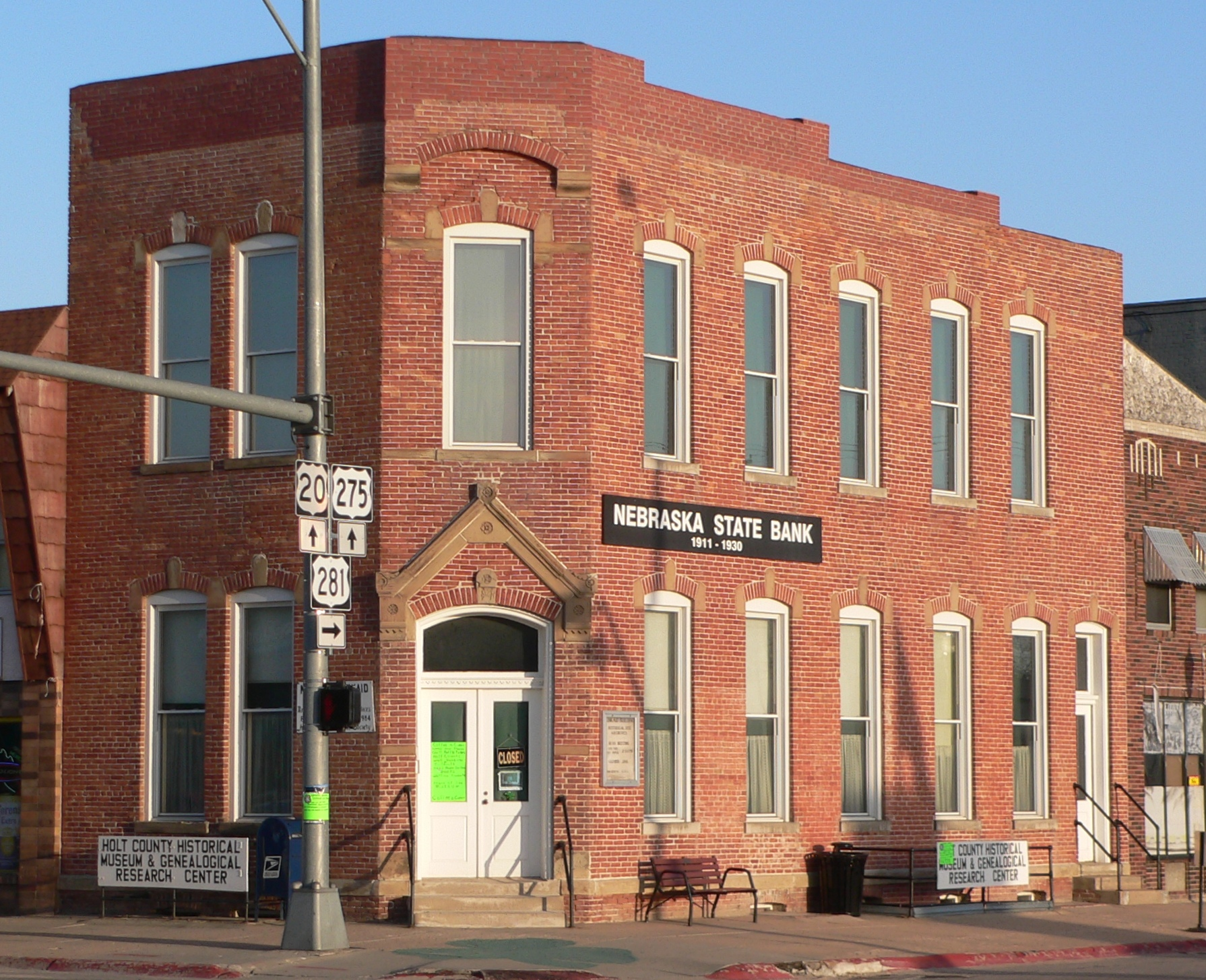
Holt County Historical Museum, formerly Nebraska State Bank, in O'Neill, Nebraska. Kinkaid's law office occupied the second floor.

== Later life and legacy ==
Kinkaid held his Congressional seat as a Republican until his death. In the 66th and 67th Congresses (1919–1922), he was Chairman of the Committee on Irrigation of Arid Lands. He died in Washington, D.C., on July 6, 1922, shortly before the end of his tenth term in office. He was buried in Prospect Hill Cemetery in O'Neill, Nebraska.

The Old Nebraska State Bank Building in O'Neill, in which Kinkaid had his law office from 1884 until his death, is now the Holt County Historical Museum. It is listed in the National Register of Historic Places. Kinkaid's office has been restored and is on display.

The Kinkaider Brewing Company in Broken Bow, Nebraska, was named in honor of the congressman and the "Kinkaiders" who settled this area of the state.

In 1963, he was inducted into the Hall of Great Westerners of the National Cowboy & Western Heritage Museum.

== See also ==
- List of members of the United States Congress who died in office (1900–1949)

U.S. House of Representatives
Preceded by William Neville (Populist)	Member of the U.S. House of Representatives from Nebraska's 6th congressional district 1903 – 1922	Succeeded by Augustin Reed Humphrey (R)
