= Evan E. Settle =

American politician

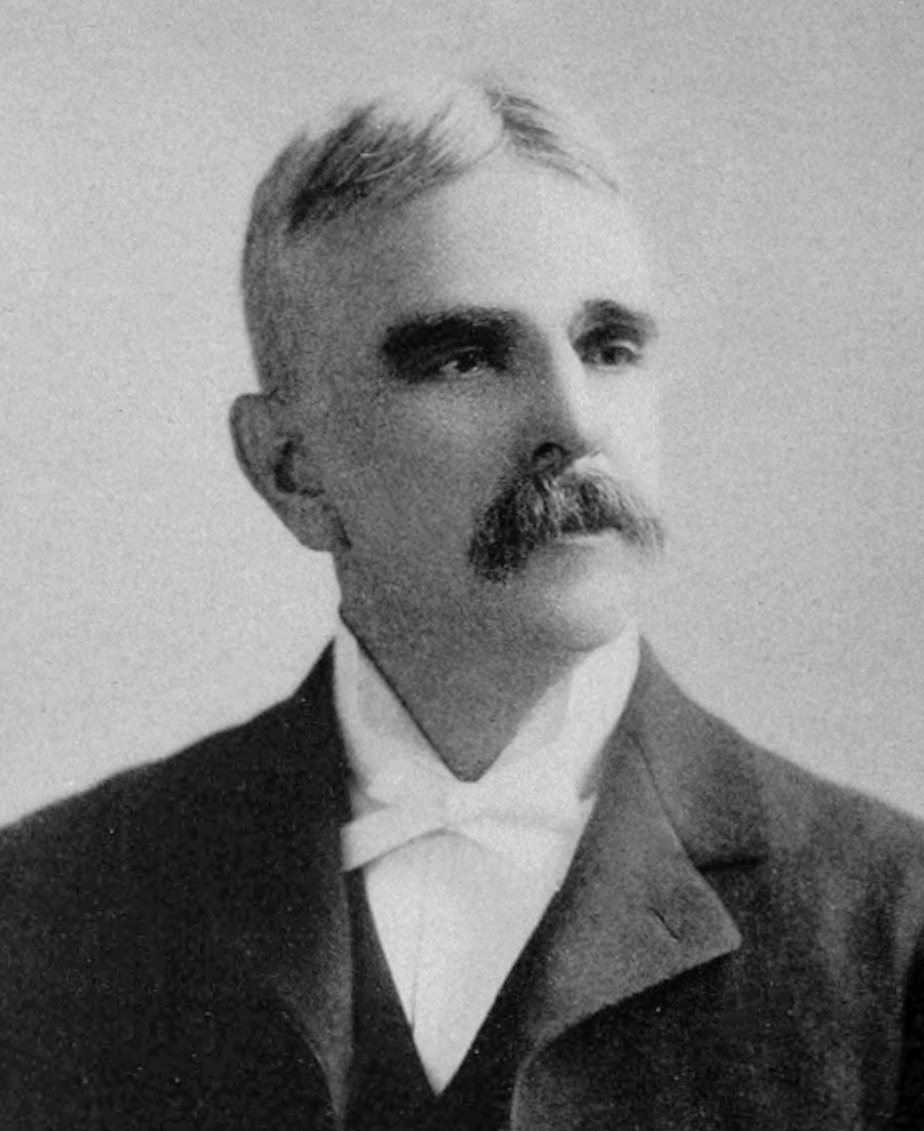

Member of the U.S. House of Representatives from Kentucky's 7th district
- In office March 4, 1897 – November 16, 1899
- Preceded by: William Claiborne Owens
- Succeeded by: June Ward Gayle

Member of the Kentucky House of Representatives from Owen County
- In office August 1, 1887 – August 3, 1891
- Preceded by: W. J. Watson
- Succeeded by: Lewis Alexander Sr.

Personal details
- Born: December 1, 1848 Frankfort, Kentucky, US
- Died: November 16, 1899 (aged 50) Owenton, Kentucky, US
- Resting place: Odd Fellows Cemetery
- Party: Democratic
- Profession: Lawyer

Evan Evans Settle (December 1, 1848 – November 16, 1899) was a U.S. representative from Kentucky.

Born in Frankfort, Kentucky, Settle attended the public schools. He was graduated from Louisville High School in June 1864. He studied law. He was admitted to the bar in 1870 and commenced practice in Owenton, Kentucky.

Settle was elected prosecuting attorney of Owen County in 1878, 1882, and 1886. He resigned in 1887. He served as member of the Kentucky House of Representatives from 1887 to 1890. He served as delegate to the 1888 Democratic National Convention.

Settle was elected as a Democrat to the Fifty-fifth and Fifty-sixth Congresses and served from March 4, 1897, until his death in Owenton, Kentucky, November 16, 1899. He was interred in Odd Fellows Cemetery.

== See also ==
- List of members of the United States Congress who died in office (1790–1899)

U.S. House of Representatives
Preceded by William C. Owens	Member of the U.S. House of Representatives from Kentucky's 7th congressional district 1897-1899	Succeeded by June W. Gayle
