= Whigville, Ohio =

- Unincorporated community
- Location within Ohio Location within the United States
- Coordinates: 39°49′39″N 81°22′25″W
- Country: United States
- State: Ohio
- County: Noble
- Elevation: 1,181 ft (360 m)
- Time zone: UTC-5 (Eastern (EST))
  - Summer (DST): UTC-4 (EDT)
- Area code: 740
- GNIS feature ID: 1077174

Whigville (also Freedom) is an unincorporated community in Noble County, Ohio, United States.

== History ==
Whigville was originally called Freedom, and under the latter name was laid out in 1846. The name was officially changed to Whigville in 1891. A post office called Whigville was established in 1851, and remained in operation until 1934.

== Notable person ==
- Capell L. Weems, Ohio politician, was born in Whigville.
