= William Neville (American politician) =

American Populist politician from Nebraska (1843–1909)

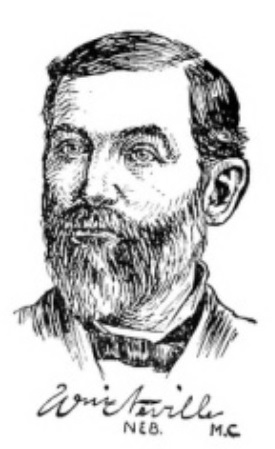
- from 1902's Around the capital with Uncle Hank

Member of the U.S. House of Representatives from Nebraska's 6th district
- In office December 4, 1899 – March 3, 1903
- Preceded by: William Laury Greene
- Succeeded by: Moses Kinkaid

Personal details
- Born: December 29, 1843 Nashville, Illinois
- Died: April 5, 1909 (aged 65) Douglas, Arizona
- Party: Populist

William Neville (December 29, 1843 – April 5, 1909) was an American Populist Party politician.

== Biography ==
He was born in Nashville, Illinois. He moved with his parents to Chester, Illinois in 1851. Graduated from McKendree University and served as a sergeant in Company H of the 142nd regiment of the Illinois Volunteer Infantry during the American Civil War. He studied law and was admitted to the bar in 1874, and set up practice in Chester.

He was a member of the Illinois House of Representatives in 1872. He moved to Nebraska in May 1874 and moved to North Platte, Nebraska in April 1877, continuing practicing law there. He ran for election to the Forty-ninth Congress and lost in 1884. He then became a judge of the thirteenth judicial district from 1891 to 1895. He was elected as a Populist to the 56th congress (1899) to fill the vacancy caused by the death of William L. Greene, was reelected to the 57th Congress, but did not stand for reelection to the 58th.

He moved to Douglas, Arizona in 1903 and resumed practicing law. He was elected a member of the Arizona territorial house of representatives in 1905. He died in Douglas, and was buried in North Platte Cemetery, North Platte.

He was the father of Nebraska Governor Keith Neville and a cousin to Bird Segle McGuire, a U.S. Representative from Oklahoma.

U.S. House of Representatives
Preceded by William Laury Greene (P)	Member of the U.S. House of Representatives from Nebraska's 6th congressional district December 4, 1899 – March 3, 1903	Succeeded by Moses Kinkaid (R)
