= William Laury Greene =

American politician

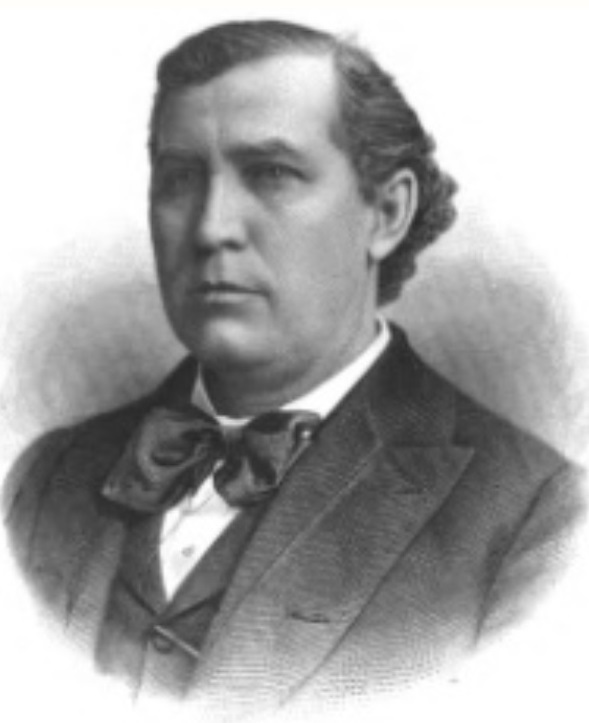
- frontispiece of 1900's Memorial Addresses on the Life and Character of William L. Greene.

Member of the U.S. House of Representatives from Nebraska's 6th district
- In office March 4, 1897 – March 11, 1899
- Preceded by: Omer Madison Kem
- Succeeded by: William Neville

Personal details
- Born: October 3, 1849 Dubois County, Indiana
- Died: March 11, 1899 (aged 49) Omaha, Nebraska
- Resting place: Kearney Cemetery, Kearney, Nebraska
- Party: Populist
- Spouse: Emma Dowell (m. 1872–1899, his death)
- Children: 7
- Profession: Attorney

William Laury Greene (October 3, 1849 – March 11, 1899) was an American Populist Party politician. He served in the United States House of Representatives from Nebraska from 1897 until his death.

== Early life and career ==
Greene was born in Pike County, Indiana, and raised on a farm in Dubois County. He worked on the family farm while attending school, and graduated from Ireland Academy. He taught school while studying law, and attained admission to the bar in 1876. Greene practiced in Bloomington, Indiana until 1883, when he moved to Kearney, Nebraska, where he continued to practice law. Greene was active in the Baptist Church, and pastored congregations and delivered sermons at churches in Indiana.

== Political career ==
Greene was an adherent of the Democratic Party, but was not politically active for most of his life. He was a founder of the Populist or People's Party in Nebraska during the agrarian reform and free silver movements of the late 1880s, and gained a reputation as an effective orator on behalf of Populist causes and candidates. In 1893, Greene was a candidate for the United States Senate. He lost the Fusion nomination (Populists and Democrats) to William V. Allen, who went on to win the seat.

In 1895, Greene was elected judge of Nebraska's 12th judicial district, and he served until 1897. In 1896, Greene was elected to the United States House of Representatives as a Populist, and he served until from March 1897 his death.

== Death and burial ==
After Congress adjourned in March 1899, Greene traveled to Lincoln, Nebraska to observe the legislative election for U.S. Senator. On March 10, he traveled from Lincoln to Omaha on business. On March 11, Greene and several friends traveled from his Omaha hotel to the train station by carriage, and upon arrival at the station, his friends observed that he was lying down on the back seat. They could not revive him, so they carried him into the train station and summoned medical aid. A doctor soon arrived, who determined that Greene had died, and the cause of death was heart failure.

Greene's funeral took place at First Baptist Church in Kearney. He was interred in Kearney Cemetery.

== Family ==
In 1872, Greene married Emma Dowell of Shoals, Indiana. They were the parents of seven children.

== See also ==
- List of members of the United States Congress who died in office (1790–1899)

== Sources ==
=== Books ===
- U.S. House of Representatives (1900). Memorial Addresses on the Life and Character of William L. Greene, Late a Representative from Nebraska. Washington, DC: US Government Printing Office.

U.S. House of Representatives
| Preceded by Omer Madison Kem (P) | Member of the U.S. House of Representatives from Nebraska's 6th congressional district March 4, 1897 – March 11, 1899 | Succeeded by William Neville (P) |
