= Amos L. Allen =

American politician (1837–1911)

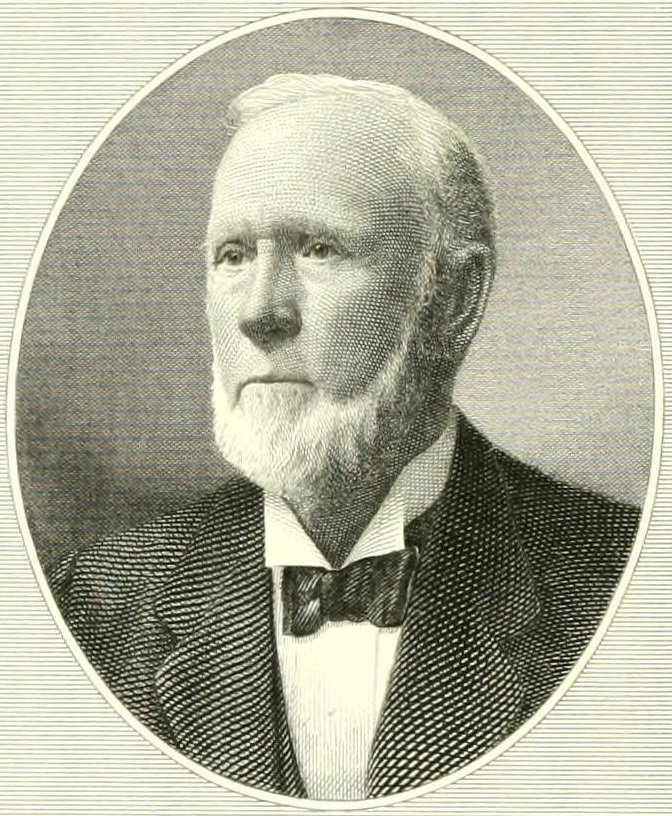

Member of the U.S. House of Representatives from Maine's 1st district
- In office November 6, 1899 – February 20, 1911
- Preceded by: Thomas B. Reed
- Succeeded by: Asher C. Hinds

Member of the Maine House of Representatives
- In office 1886-1887

Personal details
- Born: Amos Lawrence Allen; March 17, 1837 Waterboro, Maine
- Died: February 20, 1911 (aged 73) Washington, D.C.
- Party: Republican

Amos Lawrence Allen (March 17, 1837 – February 20, 1911) was an American lawyer and politician who served six terms as a U.S. representative from Maine from 1899 to 1911.

== Early life and education ==
Born in Waterboro, Maine, Allen attended the common schools, Whitestown Seminary in Whitestown, New York, and graduated from Bowdoin College in 1860. He studied law at Columbian Law School, Washington, D.C., and was admitted to the bar of York County in 1866, but never practiced.

== Career ==
He served as a clerk in the United States Treasury Department from 1867 to 1870.

Allen was elected clerk of the courts for York County, Maine in 1870. He was reelected three times and served until January 1, 1883. He served in the Maine House of Representatives in 1886 and 1887.

He was private secretary to Speaker Thomas B. Reed in the Fifty-first, Fifty-fourth, and Fifty-fifth Congresses. He served as delegate at large to the Republican National Convention at St. Louis in 1896.

=== Congress ===
Allen was elected as a Republican to the Fifty-sixth Congress to fill the vacancy caused by the resignation of Thomas B. Reed. He was reelected to the Fifty-seventh and to the four succeeding Congresses and served from November 6, 1899, until his death in Washington, D.C., on February 20, 1911, from pneumonia. He was one of 14 representatives, all Republicans, to oppose the Sixteenth Amendment to the United States Constitution, which imposed a federal income tax.

He was interred in Evergreen Cemetery, Alfred, Maine.

== See also ==
- List of members of the United States Congress who died in office (1900–1949)

U.S. House of Representatives
Preceded by Thomas B. Reed	Member of the U.S. House of Representatives from Maine's 1st congressional district November 6, 1899 – February 20, 1911	Succeeded by Asher C. Hinds
