= 58th United States Congress =

1903-1905 U.S. Congress

←	57th	59th	→
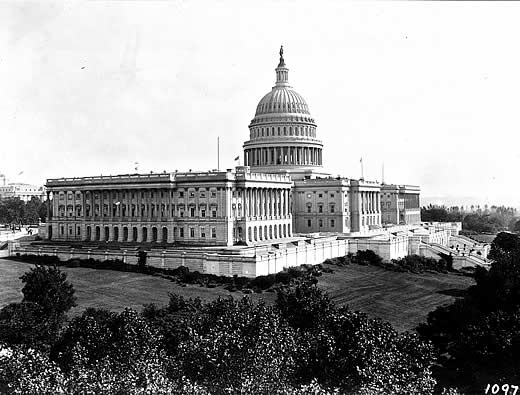
- United States Capitol (1906)

Overview
- Legislative body: United States Congress
- Jurisdiction: United States
- Term: March 4, 1903 – March 4, 1905

Senate
- Members: 90
- President: Vacant (Note: President pro tempore William P. Frye, U.S. Senator from Maine acted his duties as the President of the Senate prior to the ratification of the Twenty-fifth Amendment.)
- President pro tempore: William P. Frye (R)
- Party control: Republican

House of Representatives
- Members: 386 representatives 5 non-voting delegates
- Speaker: Joseph G. Cannon (R)
- Party control: Republican

Sessions
- Special (Note: Special session of the Senate.): March 5, 1903 – March 19, 1903
- 1st: November 9, 1903 – December 7, 1903
- 2nd: December 7, 1903 – April 28, 1904
- 3rd: December 5, 1904 – March 3, 1905

The 58th United States Congress was a meeting of the legislative branch of the United States federal government, composed of the United States Senate and the United States House of Representatives. It met in Washington, DC, from March 4, 1903, to March 4, 1905, during the third and fourth years of Theodore Roosevelt's presidency. The apportionment of seats in the House of Representatives was based on the 1900 United States census. Both chambers had a Republican majority.

== Major legislation ==
- April 28, 1904: Kinkaid Act
- February 1, 1905: Transfer Act of 1905

== Party summary ==
=== Senate ===
	Party (shading shows control)				Total	Vacant
	Democratic (D)	Populist (P)	Republican (R)	Silver Republican (SR)	Total	Vacant
End of previous congress	29	2	56	2	89	1
Begin	33	0	57	0	90	0
End	33	0	56	0	89	1
Final voting share	37.1%	0.0%	62.9%	0.0%		
Beginning of next congress	31	0	57	0	88	2

=== House of Representatives ===
	Party (shading shows control)				Total	Vacant
	Democratic (D)	Populist (P)	Republican (R)	Silver Republican (SR)	Total	Vacant
End of previous congress	148	5	197	1	351	6
Begin	178	0	206	0	384	2
End	175	0	209	0	384	2
Final voting share	45.6%	0.0%	54.4%	0.0%		
Beginning of next congress	178	0	206	0	384	2

== Leadership ==
=== Senate ===
- President: Vacant
- President pro tempore: William P. Frye (R)
- Republican Conference Chairman: William B. Allison
- Democratic Caucus Chairman: Arthur P. Gorman
- Democratic Caucus Secretary: Edward W. Carmack

=== House of Representatives ===
- Speaker: Joseph G. Cannon (R)

==== Majority (Republican) leadership ====
- Majority Leader: Sereno E. Payne
- Majority Whip: James A. Tawney
- Republican Conference Chair: William Peters Hepburn

==== Minority (Democratic) leadership ====
- Minority Leader: John Sharp Williams
- Minority Whip: James T. Lloyd
- Democratic Caucus Chairman: James Hay
- Democratic Campaign Committee Chairman: James M. Griggs

== Members ==
This list is arranged by chamber, then by state. Senators are listed in order of seniority, and representatives are listed by district.

Skip to House of Representatives, below

=== Senate ===
At this time, senators were elected by the state legislatures every two years, with one-third beginning new six-year terms with each Congress. Preceding the names in the list below are Senate class numbers, which indicate the cycle of their election, In this Congress, Class 1 meant their term ended with this Congress, facing re-election in 1904; Class 2 meant their term began in the last Congress, facing re-election in 1906; and Class 3 meant their term began in this Congress, facing re-election in 1908.

==== Alabama ====
▌2. John T. Morgan (D)
▌3. Edmund Pettus (D)

==== Arkansas ====
▌2. James H. Berry (D)
▌3. James P. Clarke (D)

==== California ====
▌1. Thomas R. Bard (R)
▌3. George C. Perkins (R)

==== Colorado ====
▌2. Thomas M. Patterson (D)
▌3. Henry M. Teller (D)

==== Connecticut ====
▌1. Joseph R. Hawley (R)
▌3. Orville H. Platt (R)

==== Delaware ====
▌1. L. Heisler Ball (R)
▌2. J. Frank Allee (R)

==== Florida ====
▌2. James P. Taliaferro (D)
▌3. Stephen Mallory (D)

==== Georgia ====
▌2. Augustus O. Bacon (D)
▌3. Alexander S. Clay (D)

==== Idaho ====
▌2. Fred T. Dubois (D)
▌3. Weldon B. Heyburn (R)

==== Illinois ====
▌2. Shelby M. Cullom (R)
▌3. Albert J. Hopkins (R)

==== Indiana ====
▌1. Albert J. Beveridge (R)
▌3. Charles W. Fairbanks (R), until March 3, 1905

==== Iowa ====
▌2. Jonathan P. Dolliver (R)
▌3. William B. Allison (R)

==== Kansas ====
▌2. Joseph R. Burton (R)
▌3. Chester I. Long (R)

==== Kentucky ====
▌2. Joseph C. S. Blackburn (D)
▌3. James B. McCreary (D)

==== Louisiana ====
▌2. Murphy J. Foster (D)
▌3. Samuel D. McEnery (D)

==== Maine ====
▌1. Eugene Hale (R)
▌2. William P. Frye (R)

==== Maryland ====
▌1. Louis E. McComas (R)
▌3. Arthur Pue Gorman (D)

==== Massachusetts ====
▌1. Henry Cabot Lodge (R)
▌2. George F. Hoar (R), until September 30, 1904

▌Winthrop M. Crane (R), from October 12, 1904

==== Michigan ====
▌1. Julius C. Burrows (R)
▌2. Russell A. Alger (R)

==== Minnesota ====
▌1. Moses E. Clapp (R)
▌2. Knute Nelson (R)

==== Mississippi ====
▌1. Hernando D. Money (D)
▌2. Anselm J. McLaurin (D)

==== Missouri ====
▌1. Francis Cockrell (D)
▌3. William J. Stone (D)

==== Montana ====
▌1. Paris Gibson (D)
▌2. William A. Clark (D)

==== Nebraska ====
▌1. Charles H. Dietrich (R)
▌2. Joseph H. Millard (R)

==== Nevada ====
▌1. William M. Stewart (R)
▌3. Francis G. Newlands (D)

==== New Hampshire ====
▌2. Henry E. Burnham (R)
▌3. Jacob H. Gallinger (R)

==== New Jersey ====
▌1. John Kean Jr. (R)
▌2. John F. Dryden (R)

==== New York ====
▌1. Chauncey M. Depew (R)
▌3. Thomas C. Platt (R)

==== North Carolina ====
▌2. Furnifold M. Simmons (D)
▌3. Lee S. Overman (D)

==== North Dakota ====
▌1. Porter J. McCumber (R)
▌3. Henry C. Hansbrough (R)

==== Ohio ====
▌1. Marcus A. Hanna (R), until February 15, 1904

▌Charles W. F. Dick (R), from March 2, 1904

▌3. Joseph B. Foraker (R)

==== Oregon ====
▌2. John H. Mitchell (R)
▌3. Charles W. Fulton (R)

==== Pennsylvania ====
▌1. Matthew S. Quay (R), until May 28, 1904

▌Philander C. Knox (R), from June 10, 1904

▌3. Boies Penrose (R)

==== Rhode Island ====
▌1. Nelson W. Aldrich (R)
▌2. George P. Wetmore (R)

==== South Carolina ====
▌2. Benjamin R. Tillman (D)
▌3. Asbury C. Latimer (D)

==== South Dakota ====
▌2. Robert J. Gamble (R)
▌3. Alfred B. Kittredge (R)

==== Tennessee ====
▌1. William B. Bate (D)
▌2. Edward W. Carmack (D)

==== Texas ====
▌1. Charles A. Culberson (D)
▌2. Joseph W. Bailey (D)

==== Utah ====
▌1. Thomas Kearns (R)
▌3. Reed Smoot (R)

==== Vermont ====
▌1. Redfield Proctor (R)
▌3. William P. Dillingham (R)

==== Virginia ====
▌1. John W. Daniel (D)
▌2. Thomas S. Martin (D)

==== Washington ====
▌1. Addison G. Foster (R)
▌3. Levi Ankeny (R)

==== West Virginia ====
▌1. Nathan B. Scott (R)
▌2. Stephen B. Elkins (R)

==== Wisconsin ====
▌1. Joseph V. Quarles (R)
▌3. John C. Spooner (R)

==== Wyoming ====
▌1. Clarence D. Clark (R)
▌2. Francis E. Warren (R)

Senators' party membership by state at the opening of the 58th Congress in March 1903. 2 Democrats 1 Democrat and 1 Republican 2 Republicans Territories

=== House of Representatives ===
The names of representatives elected statewide on the general ticket or otherwise at-large, are preceded by an "At-large," and the names of those elected from districts, whether plural or single member, are preceded by their district numbers.

Many of the congressional district numbers are linked to articles describing the district itself. Since the boundaries of the districts have changed often and substantially, the linked article may only describe the district as it exists today, and not as it was at the time of this Congress.

==== Alabama ====
▌1. George W. Taylor (D)
▌2. Ariosto A. Wiley (D)
▌3. Henry D. Clayton (D)
▌4. Sydney J. Bowie (D)
▌5. Charles Winston Thompson (D), until March 20, 1904

▌J. Thomas Heflin (D), from May 19, 1904

▌6. John H. Bankhead (D)
▌7. John L. Burnett (D)
▌8. William N. Richardson (D)
▌9. Oscar Underwood (D)

==== Arkansas ====
▌1. Robert B. Macon (D)
▌2. Stephen Brundidge Jr. (D)
▌3. Hugh A. Dinsmore (D)
▌4. John S. Little (D)
▌5. Charles C. Reid (D)
▌6. Joseph Taylor Robinson (D)
▌7. Robert M. Wallace (D)

==== California ====
▌1. James N. Gillett (R)
▌2. Theodore A. Bell (D)
▌3. Victor H. Metcalf (R), until July 1, 1904

▌Joseph R. Knowland (R), from November 8, 1904

▌4. Edward J. Livernash (D)
▌5. William J. Wynn (D)
▌6. James C. Needham (R)
▌7. James McLachlan (R)
▌8. Milton J. Daniels (R)

==== Colorado ====
▌1. John F. Shafroth (D), until February 15, 1904

▌Robert W. Bonynge (R), from February 16, 1904

▌2. Herschel M. Hogg (R)
▌At-large. Franklin E. Brooks (R)

==== Connecticut ====
▌1. E. Stevens Henry (R)
▌2. Nehemiah D. Sperry (R)
▌3. Frank B. Brandegee (R)
▌4. Ebenezer J. Hill (R)
▌At-large. George L. Lilley (R)

==== Delaware ====
▌At-large. Henry A. Houston (D)

==== Florida ====
▌1. Stephen M. Sparkman (D)
▌2. Robert W. Davis (D)
▌3. William B. Lamar (D)

==== Georgia ====
▌1. Rufus E. Lester (D)
▌2. James M. Griggs (D)
▌3. Elijah B. Lewis (D)
▌4. William C. Adamson (D)
▌5. Leonidas F. Livingston (D)
▌6. Charles L. Bartlett (D)
▌7. John W. Maddox (D)
▌8. William M. Howard (D)
▌9. Farish C. Tate (D)
▌10. Thomas W. Hardwick (D)
▌11. William G. Brantley (D)

==== Idaho ====
▌At-large. Burton L. French (R)

==== Illinois ====
▌1. Martin Emerich (D)
▌2. James R. Mann (R)
▌3. William W. Wilson (R)
▌4. George P. Foster (D)
▌5. James McAndrews (D)
▌6. William Lorimer (R)
▌7. Philip Knopf (R)
▌8. William Frank Mahoney (D), until December 27, 1904
▌9. Henry S. Boutell (R)
▌10. George E. Foss (R)
▌11. Howard M. Snapp (R)
▌12. Charles Eugene Fuller (R)
▌13. Robert R. Hitt (R)
▌14. Benjamin F. Marsh (R)
▌15. George W. Prince (R)
▌16. Joseph V. Graff (R)
▌17. John A. Sterling (R)
▌18. Joseph G. Cannon (R)
▌19. Vespasian Warner (R)
▌20. Henry T. Rainey (D)
▌21. Ben F. Caldwell (D)
▌22. William A. Rodenberg (R)
▌23. Joseph B. Crowley (D)
▌24. James R. Williams (D)
▌25. George Washington Smith (R)

==== Indiana ====
▌1. James A. Hemenway (R)
▌2. Robert W. Miers (D)
▌3. William T. Zenor (D)
▌4. Francis M. Griffith (D)
▌5. Elias S. Holliday (R)
▌6. James E. Watson (R)
▌7. Jesse Overstreet (R)
▌8. George W. Cromer (R)
▌9. Charles B. Landis (R)
▌10. Edgar D. Crumpacker (R)
▌11. Frederick Landis (R)
▌12. James M. Robinson (D)
▌13. Abraham L. Brick (R)

==== Iowa ====
▌1. Thomas Hedge (R)
▌2. Martin Joseph Wade (D)
▌3. Benjamin P. Birdsall (R)
▌4. Gilbert N. Haugen (R)
▌5. Robert G. Cousins (R)
▌6. John F. Lacey (R)
▌7. John A. T. Hull (R)
▌8. William P. Hepburn (R)
▌9. Walter I. Smith (R)
▌10. James P. Conner (R)
▌11. Lot Thomas (R)

==== Kansas ====
▌1. Charles Curtis (R)
▌2. Justin De Witt Bowersock (R)
▌3. Philip P. Campbell (R)
▌4. James Monroe Miller (R)
▌5. William A. Calderhead (R)
▌6. William A. Reeder (R)
▌7. Victor Murdock (R), from May 26, 1903
▌At-large. Charles Frederick Scott (R)

==== Kentucky ====
▌1. Ollie M. James (D)
▌2. Augustus Stanley (D)
▌3. John S. Rhea (D)
▌4. David Highbaugh Smith (D)
▌5. J. Swagar Sherley (D)
▌6. Daniel Linn Gooch (D)
▌7. South Trimble (D)
▌8. George G. Gilbert (D)
▌9. James Nicholas Kehoe (D)
▌10. Francis A. Hopkins (D)
▌11. Vincent Boreing (R), until September 16, 1903

▌W. Godfrey Hunter (R), from November 10, 1903

==== Louisiana ====
▌1. Adolph Meyer (D)
▌2. Robert C. Davey (D)
▌3. Robert F. Broussard (D)
▌4. Phanor Breazeale (D)
▌5. Joseph E. Ransdell (D)
▌6. Samuel M. Robertson (D)
▌7. Arsène Paulin Pujó (D)

==== Maine ====
▌1. Amos L. Allen (R)
▌2. Charles E. Littlefield (R)
▌3. Edwin C. Burleigh (R)
▌4. Llewellyn Powers (R)

==== Maryland ====
▌1. William Humphreys Jackson (R)
▌2. J. Frederick C. Talbott (D)
▌3. Frank C. Wachter (R)
▌4. James W. Denny (D)
▌5. Sydney Emanuel Mudd I (R)
▌6. George A. Pearre (R)

==== Massachusetts ====
▌1. George P. Lawrence (R)
▌2. Frederick H. Gillett (R)
▌3. John R. Thayer (D)
▌4. Charles Q. Tirrell (R)
▌5. Butler Ames (R)
▌6. Augustus P. Gardner (R)
▌7. Ernest W. Roberts (R)
▌8. Samuel W. McCall (R)
▌9. John A. Keliher (D)
▌10. William S. McNary (D)
▌11. John Andrew Sullivan (D)
▌12. Samuel L. Powers (R)
▌13. William S. Greene (R)
▌14. William C. Lovering (R)

==== Michigan ====
▌1. Alfred Lucking (D)
▌2. Charles E. Townsend (R)
▌3. Washington Gardner (R)
▌4. Edward L. Hamilton (R)
▌5. William Alden Smith (R)
▌6. Samuel W. Smith (R)
▌7. Henry McMorran (R)
▌8. Joseph W. Fordney (R)
▌9. Roswell P. Bishop (R)
▌10. George A. Loud (R)
▌11. Archibald B. Darragh (R)
▌12. H. Olin Young (R)

==== Minnesota ====
▌1. James Albertus Tawney (R)
▌2. James T. McCleary (R)
▌3. Charles Russell Davis (R)
▌4. Frederick C. Stevens (R)
▌5. John Lind (D)
▌6. Clarence Buckman (R)
▌7. Andrew Volstead (R)
▌8. James Bede (R)
▌9. Halvor Steenerson (R)

==== Mississippi ====
▌1. Ezekiel S. Candler Jr. (D)
▌2. Thomas Spight (D)
▌3. Benjamin G. Humphreys II (D)
▌4. Wilson S. Hill (D)
▌5. Adam M. Byrd (D)
▌6. Eaton J. Bowers (D)
▌7. Frank A. McLain (D)
▌8. John Sharp Williams (D)

==== Missouri ====
▌1. James T. Lloyd (D)
▌2. William W. Rucker (D)
▌3. John Dougherty (D)
▌4. Charles F. Cochran (D)
▌5. William S. Cowherd (D)
▌6. David A. De Armond (D)
▌7. Courtney W. Hamlin (D)
▌8. Dorsey W. Shackleford (D)
▌9. James Beauchamp Clark (D)
▌10. Richard Bartholdt (R)
▌11. John T. Hunt (D)
▌12. James Joseph Butler (D)
▌13. Edward Robb (D)
▌14. William D. Vandiver (D)
▌15. Maecenas E. Benton (D)
▌16. J. Robert Lamar (D)

==== Montana ====
▌At-large. Joseph M. Dixon (R)

==== Nebraska ====
▌1. Elmer J. Burkett (R)
▌2. Gilbert M. Hitchcock (D)
▌3. John J. McCarthy (R)
▌4. Edmund H. Hinshaw (R)
▌5. George W. Norris (R)
▌6. Moses P. Kinkaid (R)

==== Nevada ====
▌At-large. Clarence D. Van Duzer (D)

==== New Hampshire ====
▌1. Cyrus A. Sulloway (R)
▌2. Frank Dunklee Currier (R)

==== New Jersey ====
▌1. Henry C. Loudenslager (R)
▌2. John J. Gardner (R)
▌3. Benjamin F. Howell (R)
▌4. William M. Lanning (R), until June 6, 1904

▌Ira W. Wood (R), from November 8, 1904

▌5. Charles N. Fowler (R)
▌6. William Hughes (D)
▌7. Richard Wayne Parker (R)
▌8. William H. Wiley (R)
▌9. Allan Benny (D)
▌10. Allan L. McDermott (D)

==== New York ====
▌1. Townsend Scudder (D)
▌2. George H. Lindsay (D)
▌3. Charles T. Dunwell (R)
▌4. Frank E. Wilson (D)
▌5. Edward M. Bassett (D)
▌6. Robert Baker (D)
▌7. John J. Fitzgerald (D)
▌8. Timothy D. Sullivan (D)
▌9. Henry M. Goldfogle (D)
▌10. William Sulzer (D)
▌11. William Randolph Hearst (D)
▌12. George B. McClellan Jr. (D), until December 21, 1903

▌W. Bourke Cockran (D), from February 23, 1904

▌13. Francis B. Harrison (D)
▌14. Ira E. Rider (D)
▌15. William H. Douglas (R)
▌16. Jacob Ruppert (D)
▌17. Francis E. Shober (D)
▌18. Joseph A. Goulden (D)
▌19. Norton P. Otis (R), until February 20, 1905
▌20. Thomas W. Bradley (R)
▌21. John H. Ketcham (R)
▌22. William H. Draper (R)
▌23. George N. Southwick (R)
▌24. George J. Smith (R)
▌25. Lucius N. Littauer (R)
▌26. William H. Flack (R)
▌27. James S. Sherman (R)
▌28. Charles L. Knapp (R)
▌29. Michael E. Driscoll (R)
▌30. John W. Dwight (R)
▌31. Sereno E. Payne (R)
▌32. James B. Perkins (R)
▌33. Charles W. Gillet (R)
▌34. James W. Wadsworth (R)
▌35. William H. Ryan (D)
▌36. De Alva S. Alexander (R)
▌37. Edward B. Vreeland (R)

==== North Carolina ====
▌1. John Humphrey Small (D)
▌2. Claude Kitchin (D)
▌3. Charles R. Thomas (D)
▌4. Edward W. Pou (D)
▌5. William W. Kitchin (D)
▌6. Gilbert B. Patterson (D)
▌7. Robert N. Page (D)
▌8. Theodore F. Kluttz (D)
▌9. Edwin Y. Webb (D)
▌10. James M. Gudger Jr. (D)

==== North Dakota ====
▌At-large. Thomas Frank Marshall (R)
▌At-large. Burleigh F. Spalding (R)

==== Ohio ====
▌1. Nicholas Longworth (R)
▌2. Herman P. Goebel (R)
▌3. Robert M. Nevin (R)
▌4. Harvey C. Garber (D)
▌5. John S. Snook (D)
▌6. Charles Q. Hildebrant (R)
▌7. Thomas B. Kyle (R)
▌8. William R. Warnock (R)
▌9. James H. Southard (R)
▌10. Stephen Morgan (R)
▌11. Charles H. Grosvenor (R)
▌12. De Witt C. Badger (D)
▌13. Amos H. Jackson (R)
▌14. William W. Skiles (R), until January 9, 1904

▌Amos R. Webber (R), from November 8, 1904

▌15. Henry C. Van Voorhis (R)
▌16. John J. Gill (R), until October 31, 1903

▌Capell L. Weems (R), from November 3, 1903

▌17. John W. Cassingham (D)
▌18. James Kennedy (R)
▌19. Charles W. F. Dick (R), until March 23, 1904

▌W. Aubrey Thomas (R), from November 8, 1904

▌20. Jacob A. Beidler (R)
▌21. Theodore E. Burton (R)

==== Oregon ====
▌1. Binger Hermann (R), from June 1, 1903
▌2. John N. Williamson (R)

==== Pennsylvania ====
▌1. Henry H. Bingham (R)
▌2. Robert Adams Jr. (R)
▌3. Henry Burk (R), until December 5, 1903

▌George A. Castor (R), from February 16, 1904

▌4. Robert H. Foerderer (R), until July 26, 1903

▌Reuben O. Moon (R), from November 3, 1903

▌5. Edward D. Morrell (R)
▌6. George D. McCreary (R)
▌7. Thomas S. Butler (R)
▌8. Irving P. Wanger (R)
▌9. Henry B. Cassel (R)
▌10. George Howell (D), until February 10, 1904

▌William Connell (R), from February 10, 1904

▌11. Henry W. Palmer (R)
▌12. George R. Patterson (R)
▌13. Marcus C. L. Kline (D)
▌14. Charles F. Wright (R)
▌15. Elias Deemer (R)
▌16. Charles H. Dickerman (D)
▌17. Thaddeus M. Mahon (R)
▌18. Marlin E. Olmsted (R)
▌19. Alvin Evans (R)
▌20. Daniel F. Lafean (R)
▌21. Solomon R. Dresser (R)
▌22. George F. Huff (R)
▌23. Allen F. Cooper (R)
▌24. Ernest F. Acheson (R)
▌25. Arthur L. Bates (R)
▌26. Joseph H. Shull (D)
▌27. William O. Smith (R)
▌28. Joseph C. Sibley (R)
▌29. George Shiras III (R)
▌30. John Dalzell (R)
▌31. Henry K. Porter (R)
▌32. James W. Brown (R)

==== Rhode Island ====
▌1. Daniel L. D. Granger (D)
▌2. Adin B. Capron (R)

==== South Carolina ====
▌1. George S. Legare (D)
▌2. George W. Croft (D), until March 10, 1904

▌Theodore G. Croft (D), from May 17, 1904

▌3. Wyatt Aiken (D)
▌4. Joseph T. Johnson (D)
▌5. David E. Finley (D)
▌6. Robert B. Scarborough (D)
▌7. Asbury F. Lever (D)

==== South Dakota ====
▌At-large. Charles H. Burke (R)
▌At-large. Eben W. Martin (R)

==== Tennessee ====
▌1. Walter P. Brownlow (R)
▌2. Henry R. Gibson (R)
▌3. John A. Moon (D)
▌4. Morgan Cassius Fitzpatrick (D)
▌5. James D. Richardson (D)
▌6. John W. Gaines (D)
▌7. Lemuel P. Padgett (D)
▌8. Thetus W. Sims (D)
▌9. Rice A. Pierce (D)
▌10. Malcolm R. Patterson (D)

==== Texas ====
▌1. Morris Sheppard (D)
▌2. Samuel B. Cooper (D)
▌3. Gordon J. Russell (D)
▌4. Choice B. Randell (D)
▌5. James Andrew Beall (D)
▌6. Scott Field (D)
▌7. Alexander W. Gregg (D)
▌8. Thomas H. Ball (D), until November 16, 1903

▌John M. Pinckney (D), from November 17, 1903

▌9. George Farmer Burgess (D)
▌10. Albert S. Burleson (D)
▌11. Robert L. Henry (D)
▌12. Oscar W. Gillespie (D)
▌13. John H. Stephens (D)
▌14. James L. Slayden (D)
▌15. John Nance Garner (D)
▌16. William R. Smith (D)

==== Utah ====
▌At-large. Joseph Howell (R)

==== Vermont ====
▌1. David J. Foster (R)
▌2. Kittredge Haskins (R)

==== Virginia ====
▌1. William A. Jones (D)
▌2. Harry L. Maynard (D)
▌3. John Lamb (D)
▌4. Robert G. Southall (D)
▌5. Claude A. Swanson (D)
▌6. Carter Glass (D)
▌7. James Hay (D)
▌8. John F. Rixey (D)
▌9. Campbell Slemp (R)
▌10. Henry D. Flood (D)

==== Washington ====
▌At-large. Wesley L. Jones (R)
▌At-large. Francis W. Cushman (R)
▌At-large. William E. Humphrey (R)

==== West Virginia ====
▌1. Blackburn B. Dovener (R)
▌2. Alston G. Dayton (R)
▌3. Joseph Holt Gaines (R)
▌4. Harry C. Woodyard (R)
▌5. James Anthony Hughes (R)

==== Wisconsin ====
▌1. Henry Allen Cooper (R)
▌2. Henry C. Adams (R)
▌3. Joseph W. Babcock (R)
▌4. Theobald Otjen (R)
▌5. William H. Stafford (R)
▌6. Charles H. Weisse (D)
▌7. John J. Esch (R)
▌8. James H. Davidson (R)
▌9. Edward S. Minor (R)
▌10. Webster E. Brown (R)
▌11. John J. Jenkins (R)

==== Wyoming ====
▌At-large. Franklin W. Mondell (R)

==== Non-voting members ====
▌Arizona Territory. John Frank Wilson (D)
▌Hawaii Territory. Jonah Kūhiō Kalanianaʻole (R)
▌New Mexico Territory. Bernard Shandon Rodey (R)
▌Oklahoma Territory. Bird S. McGuire (R)
▌Puerto Rico. Federico Degetau (Resident Commissioner) (R)

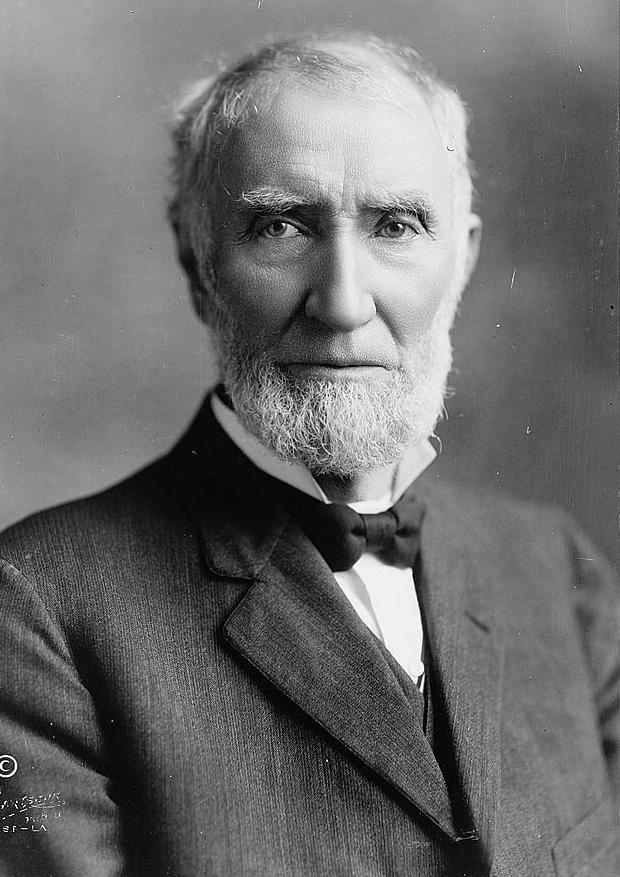
Speaker of the House Joseph G. Cannon

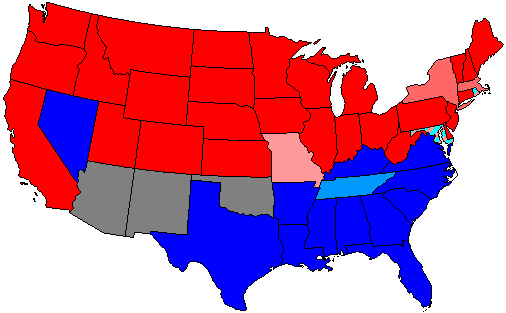
House seats by party holding plurality in state: 80+% Democratic / 80+% Republican; 60+ to 80% Democratic / 66+ to 80% Republican; Up to 60% Democratic / Up to 60% Republican

== Changes in membership ==
The count below reflects changes from the beginning of the first session of this Congress.

=== Senate ===
- Replacements: 3
  - Democratic: no net change
  - Republican: no net change
- Deaths: 3
- Resignations: 1
- Vacancy: 0
- Total seats with changes: 4

State (class)	Vacated by	Reason for vacancy	Subsequent	Date of successor's installation
Ohio (1)	Mark Hanna (R)	Died February 15, 1904. Successor was elected.	Charles W. F. Dick (R)	March 2, 1904
Pennsylvania (1)	Matthew Quay (R)	Died May 28, 1904. Successor was appointed and subsequently elected.	Philander C. Knox (R)	June 10, 1904
Massachusetts (2)	George Frisbie Hoar (R)	Died September 30, 1904. Successor was appointed and subsequently elected.	Winthrop M. Crane (R)	October 12, 1904
Indiana (3)	Charles W. Fairbanks (R)	Resigned March 3, 1905, after being elected Vice-president of the United States	Vacant until next Congress	

=== House of Representatives ===
- Replacements: 14
  - Democratic: 2 seat loss
  - Republican: 2 seat gain
- Deaths: 8
- Resignations: 7
- Contested elections: 1
- Total seats with changes: 18

District	Previous	Reason for change	Subsequent	Date of successor's installation
Kansas 7th	Vacant	Rep. Chester I. Long resigned during previous congress	Victor Murdock (R)	May 26, 1903
Oregon 1st	Vacant	Rep. Thomas H. Tongue died during previous congress	Binger Hermann (R)	June 1, 1903
Pennsylvania 4th	Robert H. Foerderer (R)	Died July 26, 1903	Reuben Moon (R)	November 3, 1903
Kentucky 11th	Vincent Boreing (R)	Died September 16, 1903	W. Godfrey Hunter (R)	November 10, 1903
Ohio 16th	Joseph J. Gill (R)	Resigned October 31, 1903	Capell L. Weems (R)	November 3, 1903
Texas 8th	Thomas Henry Ball (D)	Resigned November 16, 1903	John M. Pinckney (D)	November 17, 1903
Pennsylvania 3rd	Henry Burk (R)	Died December 5, 1903	George A. Castor (R)	February 16, 1904
New York 12th	George B. McClellan Jr. (D)	Resigned December 21, 1903, after being elected Mayor of New York	William B. Cockran (D)	February 23, 1904
Ohio 14th	William W. Skiles (R)	Died January 9, 1904	Amos R. Webber (R)	November 8, 1904
Pennsylvania 10th	George Howell (D)	Lost contested election February 10, 1904	William Connell (R)	February 10, 1904
Colorado 1st	John F. Shafroth (D)	Resigned February 15, 1904, after believing he was elected due to election irregularities	Robert W. Bonynge (R)	February 16, 1904
South Carolina 2nd	George W. Croft (D)	Died March 10, 1904	Theodore G. Croft (D)	May 17, 1904
Ohio 19th	Charles W. F. Dick (R)	Resigned March 23, 1904, after being elected to the U.S. Senate	W. Aubrey Thomas (R)	November 8, 1904
Alabama 5th	Charles W. Thompson (D)	Died March 20, 1904	J. Thomas Heflin (D)	May 19, 1904
New Jersey 4th	William M. Lanning (R)	Resigned June 6, 1904, after being appointed judge for the United States District Court for the District of New Jersey	Ira W. Wood (R)	November 8, 1904
California 3rd	Victor H. Metcalf (R)	Resigned July 1, 1904, after being appointed United States Department of Commerce and Labor	Joseph R. Knowland (R)	November 8, 1904
Illinois 8th	William F. Mahoney (D)	Died December 27, 1904	Seat remained vacant until next Congress	
New York 19th	Norton P. Otis (R)	Died February 20, 1905	Seat remained vacant until next Congress	

== Committees ==
Lists of committees and their party leaders for members of the House and Senate committees can be found through the Official Congressional Directory at the bottom of this article. The directory after the pages of terms of service lists committees of the Senate, House (Standing with Subcommittees, Select and Special) and Joint and, after that, House/Senate committee assignments. On the committees section of the House and Senate in the Official Congressional Directory, the committee's members on the first row on the left side shows the chairman of the committee and on the right side shows the ranking member of the committee.

=== Senate ===
- Additional Accommodations for the Library of Congress (Select) (Chairman: James H. Berry; Ranking Member: Shelby M. Cullom)
- Agriculture and Forestry (Chairman: Redfield Proctor; Ranking Member: William B. Bate)
- Appropriations (Chairman: William B. Allison; Ranking Member: Francis M. Cockrell)
- Audit and Control the Contingent Expenses of the Senate (Chairman: John Kean; Ranking Member: Hernando D. Money)
- Canadian Relations (Chairman: Charles W. Fulton; Ranking Member: Benjamin R. Tillman)
- Census (Chairman: Joseph V. Quarles; Ranking Member: Samuel D. McEnery)
- Civil Service and Retrenchment (Chairman: George C. Perkins; Ranking Member: William B. Bate)
- Claims (Chairman: Francis E. Warren; Ranking Member: Thomas S. Martin)
- Coast and Insular Survey (Chairman: Levi Ankeny; Ranking Member: John Tyler Morgan)
- Coast Defenses (Chairman: John H. Mitchell; Ranking Member: Charles A. Culberson)
- Commerce (Chairman: William P. Frye; Ranking Member: James H. Berry)
- Corporations Organized in the District of Columbia (Chairman: Thomas S. Martin; Ranking Member: Nelson W. Aldrich)
- Cuban Relations (Chairman: Orville H. Platt; Ranking Member: Henry M. Teller)
- Distributing Public Revenue Among the States (Select)
- District of Columbia (Chairman: Jacob H. Gallinger; Ranking Member: Nelson W. Aldrich)
- Education and Labor (Chairman: Louis E. McComas; Ranking Member: John W. Daniel)
- Engrossed Bills (Chairman: Francis M. Cockrell; Ranking Member: George F. Hoar)
- Enrolled Bills (Chairman: John F. Dryden; Ranking Member: Murphy J. Foster)
- Establish a University in the United States (Select) (Chairman: Chester I. Long; Ranking Member: Alexander S. Clay)
- Examination and Disposition of Documents (Select) (Chairman: Russell A. Alger; Ranking Member: N/A)
- Examine the Several Branches in the Civil Service (Chairman: Moses E. Clapp; Ranking Member: Charles A. Culberson)
- Expenditures in Executive Departments
- Finance (Chairman: Nelson W. Aldrich; Ranking Member: John W. Daniel)
- Fisheries (Chairman: Albert J. Hopkins; Ranking Member: Stephen R. Mallory)
- Five Civilized Tribes of Indians (Select) (Chairman: William B. Bate; Ranking Member: Charles H. Dietrich)
- Foreign Relations (Chairman: Shelby M. Cullom; Ranking Member: John Tyler Morgan)
- Forest Reservations and the Protection of Game (Chairman: Joseph R. Burton; Ranking Member: John T. Morgan)
- Geological Survey (Chairman: Addison G. Foster; Ranking Member: Hernando D. Money)
- Immigration (Chairman: William P. Dillingham; Ranking Member: Anselm J. McLaurin)
- Indian Affairs (Chairman: William M. Stewart; Ranking Member: John Tyler Morgan)
- Indian Depredations (Chairman: J. Frank Allee; Ranking Member: Augustus O. Bacon)
- Industrial Expositions (Chairman: Henry E. Burnham; Ranking Member: John W. Daniel)
- Investigate the Condition of the Potomac River Front at Washington (Select) (Chairman: Joseph H. Millard; Ranking Member: William B. Bate)
- Indian Territory (Select)
- Interoceanic Canals (Chairman: Mark Hanna; Ranking Member: Edward W. Carmack)
- Interstate Commerce (Chairman: Stephen B. Elkins; Ranking Member: Benjamin R. Tillman)
- Irrigation and Reclamation of Arid Lands (Chairman: Thomas R. Bard; Ranking Member: Josiah W. Bailey)
- Judiciary (Chairman: George F. Hoar; Ranking Member: Augustus O. Bacon)
- Library (Chairman: George P. Wetmore; Ranking Member: William A. Clark)
- Manufactures (Chairman: Weldon B. Heyburn; Ranking Member: Alexander S. Clay)
- Military Affairs (Chairman: Joseph R. Hawley; Ranking Member: William B. Bate)
- Mines and Mining (Chairman: Nathan B. Scott; Ranking Member: Benjamin R. Tillman)
- Mississippi River and its Tributaries (Select) (Chairman: Knute Nelson; Ranking Member: William B. Bate)
- National Banks (Select) (Chairman: Thomas Kearns; Ranking Member: Samuel D. McEnery)
- Naval Affairs (Chairman: Eugene Hale; Ranking Member: Benjamin R. Tillman)
- Organization, Conduct and Expenditures of the Executive Departments (Chairman: Matthew S. Quay; Ranking Member: Anselm J. McLaurin)
- Pacific Islands and Puerto Rico (Chairman: Joseph B. Foraker; Ranking Member: Francis M. Cockrell)
- Pacific Railroads (Chairman: Jonathan P. Dolliver; Ranking Member: John Tyler Morgan)
- Patents (Chairman: Alfred B. Kittredge; Ranking Member: Stephen R. Mallory)
- Pensions (Chairman: Porter J. McCumber; Ranking Member: James P. Taliaferro)
- Philippines (Chairman: Henry Cabot Lodge; Ranking Member: Charles A. Culberson)
- Post Office and Post Roads (Chairman: Boies Penrose; Ranking Member: Alexander S. Clay)
- Potomac River Front (Select)
- Printing (Chairman: Thomas C. Platt; Ranking Member: Arthur P. Gorman)
- Private Land Claims (Chairman: Henry M. Teller; Ranking Member: Eugene Hale)
- Privileges and Elections (Chairman: Julius C. Burrows; Ranking Member: Edmund W. Pettus)
- Public Buildings and Grounds (Chairman: Charles W. Fairbanks; Ranking Member: Charles A. Culberson)
- Public Health and National Quarantine (Chairman: John Tyler Morgan; Ranking Member: John Coit Spooner)
- Public Lands (Chairman: Henry C. Hansbrough; Ranking Member: James H. Berry)
- Railroads (Chairman: Clarence D. Clark; Ranking Member: Augustus O. Bacon)
- Revision of the Laws (Chairman: Chauncey M. Depew; Ranking Member: John W. Daniel)
- Revolutionary Claims (Chairman: Benjamin R. Tillman; Ranking Member: Orville H. Platt)
- Rules (Chairman: John C. Spooner; Ranking Member: Henry M. Teller)
- Standards, Weights and Measures (Select) (Chairman: Reed Smoot)
- Tariff Regulation (Select)
- Territories (Chairman: Albert J. Beveridge; Ranking Member: William B. Bate)
- Transportation and Sale of Meat Products (Select) (Chairman: John W. Daniel; Ranking Member: Porter J. McCumber)
- Transportation Routes to the Seaboard (Chairman: Robert J. Gamble; Ranking Member: Edmund W. Pettus)
- Trespassers upon Indian Lands (Select) (Chairman: Charles H. Dietrich; Ranking Member: John Tyler Morgan)
- Ventilation and Acoustics (Select) (Chairman: L. Heisler Ball; Ranking Member: N/A)
- Whole
- Woman Suffrage (Select) (Chairman: Augustus O. Bacon; Ranking Member: Thomas R. Bard)

=== House of Representatives ===
- Accounts (Chairman: Charles Q. Hildebrant; Ranking Member: Charles Lafayette Bartlett)
- Agriculture (Chairman: James W. Wadsworth; Ranking Member: John Lamb)
- Alcoholic Liquor Traffic (Chairman: Nehemiah D. Sperry; Ranking Member: John L. Burnett)
- Appropriations (Chairman: James A. Hemenway; Ranking Member: Leonidas F. Livingston)
- Banking and Currency (Chairman: Charles N. Fowler; Ranking Member: John R. Thayer)
- Census (Chairman: Edgar D. Crumpacker; Ranking Member: Francis M. Griffith)
- Claims (Chairman: Joseph V. Graff; Ranking Member: Henry M. Goldfogle)
- Coinage, Weights and Measures (Chairman: James H. Southard; Ranking Member: Charles F. Cochran)
- Disposition of Executive Papers
- District of Columbia (Chairman: Joseph W. Babcock; Ranking Member: Adolph Meyer)
- Education (Chairman: George N. Southwick; Ranking Member: Willard Vandiver)
- Election of the President, Vice President and Representatives in Congress (Chairman: Joseph H. Gaines; Ranking Member: William W. Rucker)
- Elections No.#1 (Chairman: James Robert Mann; Ranking Member: Ollie M. James)
- Elections No.#2 (Chairman: Marlin E. Olmsted; Ranking Member: Joshua Frederick Cockey Talbott)
- Elections No.#3 (Chairman: Michael E. Driscoll; Ranking Member: Frank A. McLain)
- Enrolled Bills (Chairman: Frank C. Wachter; Ranking Member: James T. Lloyd)
- Expenditures in the Agriculture Department (Chairman: Charles F. Wright; Ranking Member: Henry D. Flood)
- Expenditures in the Commerce and Labor Departments (Chairman: David J. Foster; Ranking Member: N/A)
- Expenditures in the Interior Department (Chairman: Edward S. Minor; Ranking Member: Ezekiel S. Candler Jr.)
- Expenditures in the Justice Department (Chairman: William A. Calderhead; Ranking Member: Henry M. Goldfogle)
- Expenditures in the Navy Department (Chairman: Joseph W. Fordney; Ranking Member: Charles W. Thompson)
- Expenditures in the Post Office Department (Chairman: Irving P. Wanger; Ranking Member: Edward Robb)
- Expenditures in the State Department (Chairman: John H. Ketcham; Ranking Member: Rufus E. Lester)
- Expenditures in the Treasury Department (Chairman: Robert G. Cousins; Ranking Member: John Lamb)
- Expenditures in the War Department (Chairman: William R. Warnock; Ranking Member: George F. Burgess)
- Expenditures on Public Buildings (Chairman: James A. Hughes; Ranking Member: John H. Small)
- Foreign Affairs (Chairman: Robert R. Hitt; Ranking Member: Hugh A. Dinsmore)
- Immigration and Naturalization (Chairman: Benjamin F. Howell; Ranking Member: Jacob Ruppert Jr.)
- Indian Affairs (Chairman: James S. Sherman; Ranking Member: John H. Stephens)
- Industrial Arts and Expositions (Chairman: James A. Tawney; Ranking Member: Charles Lafayette Bartlett)
- Insular Affairs (Chairman: Henry Allen Cooper; Ranking Member: William A. Jones)
- Interstate and Foreign Commerce (Chairman: William P. Hepburn; Ranking Member: Robert C. Davey)
- Invalid Pensions (Chairman: Cyrus A. Sulloway; Ranking Member: Robert W. Miers)
- Irrigation of Arid Lands (Chairman: Frank W. Mondell; Ranking Member: Oscar W. Underwood)
- Judiciary (Chairman: John J. Jenkins; Ranking Member: David A. De Armond)
- Labor (Chairman: John J. Gardner; Ranking Member: Ben F. Caldwell)
- Levees and Improvements of the Mississippi River (Chairman: Richard Bartholdt; Ranking Member: Robert F. Broussard)
- Library (Chairman: James T. McCleary; Ranking Member: James D. Richardson)
- Manufactures (Chairman: Joseph C. Sibley; Ranking Member: Willard D. Vandiver)
- Merchant Marine and Fisheries (Chairman: Charles H. Grosvenor; Ranking Member: Thomas Spight)
- Mileage (Chairman: William A. Reeder; Ranking Member: Elijah B. Lewis)
- Military Affairs (Chairman: John A.T. Hull; Ranking Member: William Sulzer)
- Militia (Chairman: Charles Dick; Ranking Member: Joseph B. Crowley)
- Mines and Mining (Chairman: Webster E. Brown; Ranking Member: Farish Carter Tate)
- Naval Affairs (Chairman: George E. Foss; Ranking Member: Adolph Meyer)
- Pacific Railroads (Chairman: William A. Smith; Ranking Member: William J. Wynn)
- Patents (Chairman: Frank D. Currier; Ranking Member: William Sulzer)
- Pensions (Chairman: Henry C. Loudenslager; Ranking Member: William Richardson)
- Post Office and Post Roads (Chairman: Jesse Overstreet; Ranking Member: John A. Moon)
- Printing (Chairman: Charles B. Landis; Ranking Member: Farish Carter Tate)
- Private Land Claims (Chairman: George W. Smith; Ranking Member: William A. Jones)
- Public Buildings and Grounds (Chairman: Charles W. Gillet; Ranking Member: John H. Bankhead)
- Public Lands (Chairman: John F. Lacey; Ranking Member: John F. Shafroth)
- Railways and Canals (Chairman: James H. Davidson; Ranking Member: John L. Burnett)
- Reform in the Civil Service (Chairman: Frederick H. Gillett; Ranking Member: Edward W. Pou)
- Revision of Laws (Chairman: Vespasian Warner; Ranking Member: Daniel L.D. Granger)
- Rivers and Harbors (Chairman: Theodore E. Burton; Ranking Member: Rufus E. Lester)
- Rules (Chairman: John Dalzell; Ranking Member: John S. Williams)
- Standards of Official Conduct
- Territories (Chairman: Edward L. Hamilton; Ranking Member: John A. Moon)
- Ventilation and Acoustics (Chairman: Roswell P. Bishop; Ranking Member: David H. Smith)
- War Claims (Chairman: Thaddeus M. Mahon; Ranking Member: Thetus W. Sims)
- Ways and Means (Chairman: Sereno E. Payne; Ranking Member: John S. Williams)
- Whole

=== Joint committees ===
- Conditions of Indian Tribes (Special)
- Disposition of (Useless) Executive Papers
- The Library
- Printing

== Caucuses ==
- Democratic (House)
- Democratic (Senate)

== Employees ==
=== Legislative branch agency directors ===
- Architect of the Capitol: Elliott Woods
- Librarian of Congress: Herbert Putnam
- Public Printer of the United States: Francis W. Palmer

=== Senate ===
- Secretary: Charles G. Bennett
- Sergeant at Arms: Daniel M. Ransdell
- Librarian: Cliff Warden
- Chaplain: William Henry Milburn, Universalist, until November 23, 1903
  - F.J. Prettyman, Methodist, elected November 23, 1903
  - Edward E. Hale, Unitarian, elected December 14, 1903

=== House of Representatives ===
- Clerk: Alexander McDowell
- Sergeant at Arms: Henry Casson
- Doorkeeper: Frank B. Lyon
- Postmaster: Joseph C. McElroy
- Reading Clerks: E. L. Lampson (D) and Dennis E. Alward (R)
- Clerk at the Speaker's Table: Asher C. Hinds
- Chaplain: Henry N. Couden, Universalist

== See also ==
- 1902 United States elections (elections leading to this Congress)
  - 1902–03 United States Senate elections
  - 1902 United States House of Representatives elections
- 1904 United States elections (elections during this Congress, leading to the next Congress)
  - 1904 United States presidential election
  - 1904–05 United States Senate elections
  - 1904 United States House of Representatives elections
