= 57th United States Congress =

1901-1903 U.S. Congress

←	56th	58th	→
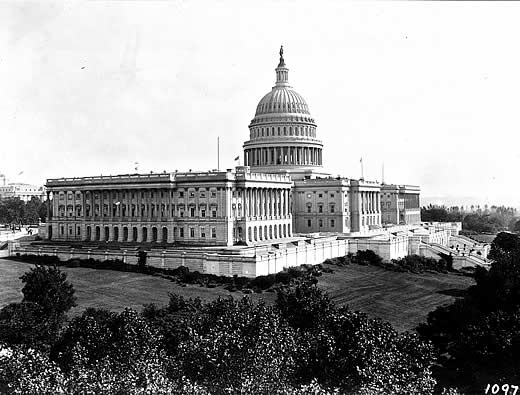
- United States Capitol (1906)

Overview
- Legislative body: United States Congress
- Jurisdiction: United States
- Term: March 4, 1901 – March 4, 1903

Senate
- Members: 90
- President: Theodore Roosevelt (R) (Note: U.S. Vice President Roosevelt's term as President of the Senate ended on September 14, 1901 when he ascended to the presidency. President pro tempore William P. Frye acted his duties as the president of the Senate prior to the ratification of the Twenty-fifth Amendment.) (until September 14, 1901); Vacant (from September 14, 1901)
- President pro tempore: William P. Frye (R)
- Party control: Republican

House of Representatives
- Members: 357 representatives 5 non-voting delegates
- Speaker: David B. Henderson (R)
- Party control: Republican

Sessions
- Special (Note: Special session of the Senate.): March 4, 1901 – March 9, 1901
- 1st: December 2, 1901 – July 1, 1902
- 2nd: December 1, 1902 – March 3, 1903

The 57th United States Congress was a meeting of the legislative branch of the United States federal government, composed of the United States Senate and the United States House of Representatives. It met in Washington, DC from March 4, 1901, to March 4, 1903, during the final six months of William McKinley's presidency, and the first year and a half of the first administration of his successor, Theodore Roosevelt. The apportionment of seats in the House of Representatives was based on the 1890 United States census. Both chambers had a Republican majority.

== Major events ==
- September 6, 1901: Leon Czolgosz shot President William McKinley at the Pan-American Exposition in Buffalo, New York
- September 14, 1901: President William McKinley died. Vice President Theodore Roosevelt became President of the United States
- October 16, 1901: President Roosevelt invited African American leader Booker T. Washington to the White House. The American South reacted angrily to the visit, and racial violence increased in the region.
- December 3, 1901: President Roosevelt delivered a 20,000-word speech to the House of Representatives, asking Congress to curb the power of trusts "within reasonable limits."
- February 22, 1902: Senators Benjamin Tillman and John L. McLaurin, both of South Carolina, have a fist fight while Congress is in session. Both Tillman and McLaurin were later censured by the Senate on February 28.
- June 2, 1902: The Anthracite Coal Strike by the United Mine Workers began, continuing until October 21, 1902.
- July 4, 1902: The Philippine–American War ended.

== Major legislation ==
- June 17, 1902: Newlands Reclamation Act
- June 28, 1902: Spooner Act (Panama Canal), Sess. 1, ch. 1302, 32 Stat. 481
- January 21, 1903: Militia Act of 1903 (Dick Act), 32 Stat. 775
- February 11, 1903: Expediting Act, Sess. 2, ch. 544, 32 Stat. 823
- February 19, 1903: Elkins Act
- March 3, 1903: Immigration Act of 1903, including §39, the Anarchist Exclusion Act

== Party summary ==
=== Senate ===
	Party (shading shows control)					Total	Vacant
	Democratic (D)	Populist (P)	Republican (R)	Silver Republican (SR)	Silver (S)	Total	Vacant
End of previous congress	25	5	53	3	2	88	2
Begin	28	3	53	2	0	86	4
End	29	2	57	2	0	90	0
Final voting share	32.2%	2.2%	63.3%	2.2%	0.0%		
Beginning of next congress	33	0	55	2	0	90	0

- Note: Fred T. Dubois (Idaho) was elected as a Silver Republican, but changed parties to Democratic after this Congress began.

=== House of Representatives ===
	Party (shading shows control)					Total	Vacant
	Democratic (D)	Populist (P)	Republican (R)	Silver Republican (SR)	Silver (S)	Total	Vacant
End of previous congress	158	6	186	2	1	353	4
Begin	152	5	196	1	1	355	2
End	147	5	197	1	1	351	6
Final voting share	41.9%	1.4%	56.1%	0.3%	0.3%		
Beginning of next congress	178	0	206	0	0	384	2

== Leadership ==
=== Senate leadership ===
Senate President

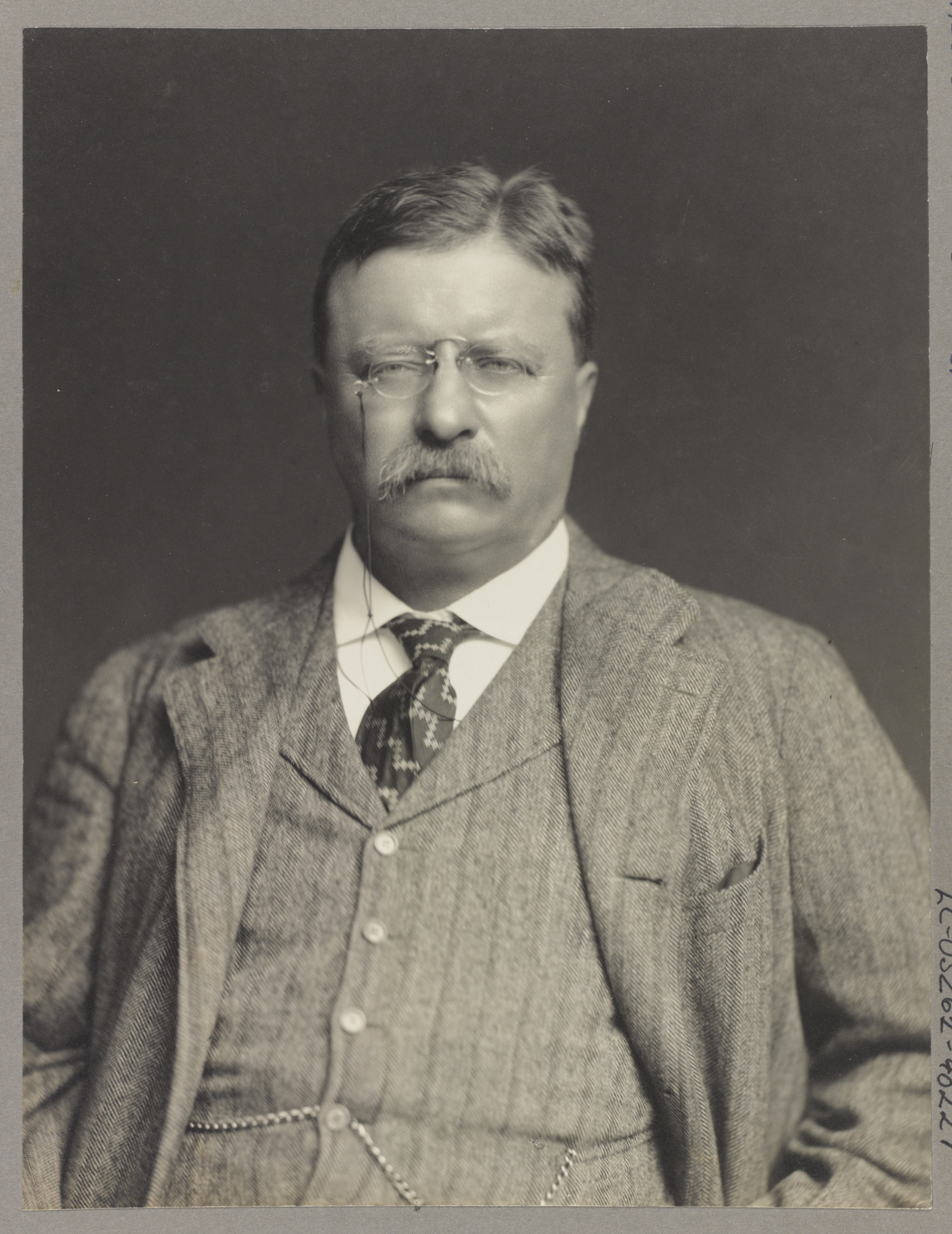
Theodore Roosevelt (R)

Senate
President pro tempore

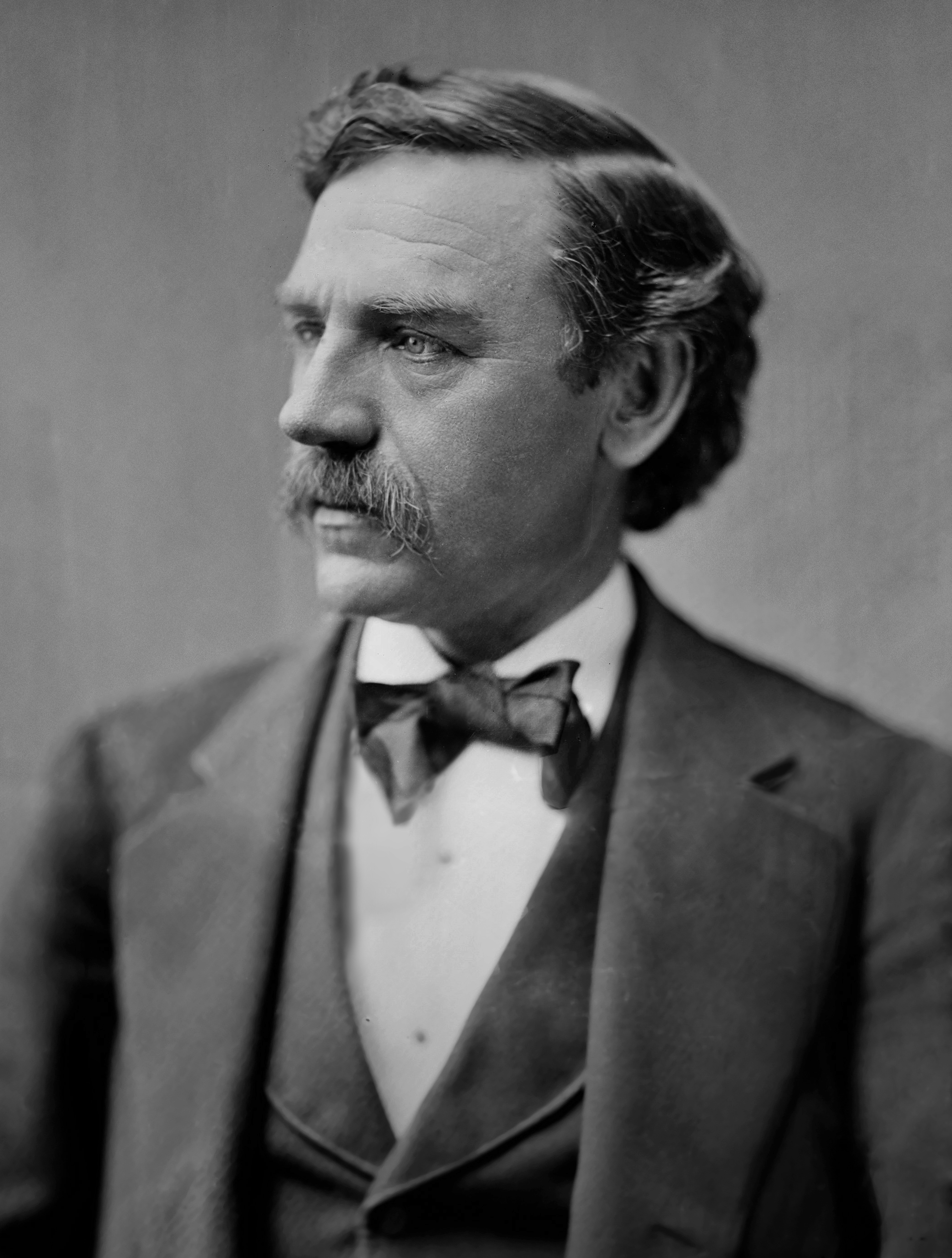
William P. Frye (R)

==== Presiding ====
- President: Theodore Roosevelt (R), until September 14, 1901; vacant thereafter.
- President pro tempore: William P. Frye (R)
- Democratic Caucus Chairman: James K. Jones
- Republican Conference Chairman: William B. Allison

=== House leadership ===
House Speaker

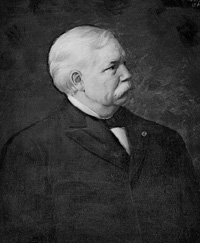
David B. Henderson (R)

==== Presiding ====
- Speaker: David B. Henderson (R)
- Democratic Caucus Chairman: James Hay
- Republican Conference Chairman: Joseph G. Cannon
- Republican Campaign Committee Chairman: Joseph W. Babcock

==== Majority (Republican) leadership ====
- Majority Leader: Sereno E. Payne
- Majority Whip: James A. Tawney

==== Minority (Democratic) leadership ====
- Minority Leader: James D. Richardson
- Minority Whip: James T. Lloyd

== Members ==
This list is arranged by chamber, then by state. Senators are listed by class, and representatives are listed by district.

Skip to House of Representatives, below

=== Senate ===
At this time, senators were elected by the state legislatures every two years, with one-third beginning new six-year terms with each Congress. The Senate class numbers, which indicate the cycle of their election, precede the names in the list below. In this Congress, Class 1 meant their term began in the last Congress, requiring reelection in 1904; Class 2 meant their term began with this Congress, requiring reelection in 1906; and Class 3 meant their term ended with this Congress, requiring reelection in 1902.

==== Alabama ====
▌2. John T. Morgan (D)
▌3. Edmund Pettus (D)

==== Arkansas ====
▌2. James H. Berry (D)
▌3. James K. Jones (D)

==== California ====
▌1. Thomas R. Bard (R)
▌3. George C. Perkins (R)

==== Colorado ====
▌2. Thomas M. Patterson (D)
▌3. Henry M. Teller (SR)

==== Connecticut ====
▌1. Joseph R. Hawley (R)
▌3. Orville H. Platt (R)

==== Delaware ====
▌1. L. Heisler Ball (R), from March 2, 1903
▌2. J. Frank Allee (R), from March 2, 1903

==== Florida ====
▌1. James P. Taliaferro (D)
▌3. Stephen Mallory (D)

==== Georgia ====
▌2. Augustus O. Bacon (D)
▌3. Alexander S. Clay (D)

==== Idaho ====
▌2. Fred T. Dubois (D)
▌3. Henry Heitfeld (P)

==== Illinois ====
▌2. Shelby M. Cullom (R)
▌3. William E. Mason (R)

==== Indiana ====
▌1. Albert J. Beveridge (R)
▌3. Charles W. Fairbanks (R)

==== Iowa ====
▌2. Jonathan P. Dolliver (R)
▌3. William B. Allison (R)

==== Kansas ====
▌2. Joseph R. Burton (R)
▌3. William A. Harris (P)

==== Kentucky ====
▌2. Joseph C. S. Blackburn (D)
▌3. William J. Deboe (R)

==== Louisiana ====
▌2. Murphy J. Foster (D)
▌3. Samuel D. McEnery (D)

==== Maine ====
▌1. Eugene Hale (R)
▌2. William P. Frye (R)

==== Maryland ====
▌1. Louis E. McComas (R)
▌3. George L. Wellington (R)

==== Massachusetts ====
▌1. Henry Cabot Lodge (R)
▌2. George F. Hoar (R)

==== Michigan ====
▌1. Julius C. Burrows (R)
▌2. James McMillan (R), until August 10, 1902

▌Russell A. Alger (R), from September 27, 1902

==== Minnesota ====
▌1. Moses E. Clapp (R)
▌2. Knute Nelson (R)

==== Mississippi ====
▌1. Hernando D. Money (D)
▌2. Anselm J. McLaurin (D)

==== Missouri ====
▌1. Francis Cockrell (D)
▌3. George G. Vest (D)

==== Montana ====
▌1. Paris Gibson (D), from March 7, 1901
▌2. William A. Clark (D)

==== Nebraska ====
▌1. William V. Allen (P), until March 28, 1901

▌Charles H. Dietrich (R), from March 28, 1901

▌2. Joseph H. Millard (R), from March 28, 1901

==== Nevada ====
▌1. William M. Stewart (R)
▌3. John P. Jones (R)

==== New Hampshire ====
▌2. Henry E. Burnham (R)
▌3. Jacob H. Gallinger (R)

==== New Jersey ====
▌1. John Kean Jr. (R)
▌2. William J. Sewell (R), until December 27, 1901

▌John F. Dryden (R), from January 29, 1902

==== New York ====
▌1. Chauncey M. Depew (R)
▌3. Thomas C. Platt (R)

==== North Carolina ====
▌2. Furnifold M. Simmons (D)
▌3. Jeter C. Pritchard (R)

==== North Dakota ====
▌1. Porter J. McCumber (R)
▌3. Henry C. Hansbrough (R)

==== Ohio ====
▌1. Marcus A. Hanna (R)
▌3. Joseph B. Foraker (R)

==== Oregon ====
▌2. John H. Mitchell (R)
▌3. Joseph Simon (R)

==== Pennsylvania ====
▌1. Matthew S. Quay (R)
▌3. Boies Penrose (R)

==== Rhode Island ====
▌1. Nelson W. Aldrich (R)
▌2. George P. Wetmore (R)

==== South Carolina ====
▌2. Benjamin R. Tillman (D)
▌3. John L. McLaurin (D)

==== South Dakota ====
▌2. Robert J. Gamble (R)
▌3. James H. Kyle (R), until July 1, 1901

▌Alfred B. Kittredge (R), from July 11, 1901

==== Tennessee ====
▌1. William B. Bate (D)
▌2. Edward W. Carmack (D)

==== Texas ====
▌1. Charles A. Culberson (D)
▌2. Joseph W. Bailey (D)

==== Utah ====
▌1. Thomas Kearns (R)
▌3. Joseph L. Rawlins (D)

==== Vermont ====
▌1. Redfield Proctor (R)
▌3. William P. Dillingham (R)

==== Virginia ====
▌1. John W. Daniel (D)
▌2. Thomas S. Martin (D)

==== Washington ====
▌1. Addison G. Foster (R)
▌3. George Turner (SR)

==== West Virginia ====
▌1. Nathan B. Scott (R)
▌2. Stephen B. Elkins (R)

==== Wisconsin ====
▌1. Joseph V. Quarles (R)
▌3. John C. Spooner (R)

==== Wyoming ====
▌1. Clarence D. Clark (R)
▌2. Francis E. Warren (R)

Senators' party membership by state at the opening of the 57th Congress in March 1901. The green stripes represent Populists, while the gray stripes represent Silver Republicans. 2 Democrats 1 Democrat and 1 Republican 2 Republicans Territories

=== House of Representatives ===
==== Alabama ====
▌1. George W. Taylor (D)
▌2. Ariosto A. Wiley (D)
▌3. Henry D. Clayton (D)
▌4. Sydney J. Bowie (D)
▌5. Charles Winston Thompson (D)
▌6. John H. Bankhead (D)
▌7. John L. Burnett (D)
▌8. William N. Richardson (D)
▌9. Oscar Underwood (D)

==== Arkansas ====
▌1. Philip D. McCulloch Jr. (D)
▌2. John S. Little (D)
▌3. Thomas C. McRae (D)
▌4. Charles C. Reid (D)
▌5. Hugh A. Dinsmore (D)
▌6. Stephen Brundidge Jr. (D)

==== California ====
▌1. Frank Coombs (R)
▌2. Samuel D. Woods (R)
▌3. Victor H. Metcalf (R)
▌4. Julius Kahn (R)
▌5. Eugene F. Loud (R)
▌6. James McLachlan (R)
▌7. James C. Needham (R)

==== Colorado ====
▌1. John F. Shafroth (SR)
▌2. John C. Bell (P)

==== Connecticut ====
▌1. E. Stevens Henry (R)
▌2. Nehemiah D. Sperry (R)
▌3. Charles A. Russell (R), until October 23, 1902

▌Frank B. Brandegee (R), from November 4, 1902

▌4. Ebenezer J. Hill (R)

==== Delaware ====
▌At-large. L. Heisler Ball (R)

==== Florida ====
▌1. Stephen M. Sparkman (D)
▌2. Robert W. Davis (D)

==== Georgia ====
▌1. Rufus E. Lester (D)
▌2. James M. Griggs (D)
▌3. Elijah B. Lewis (D)
▌4. William C. Adamson (D)
▌5. Leonidas F. Livingston (D)
▌6. Charles L. Bartlett (D)
▌7. John W. Maddox (D)
▌8. William M. Howard (D)
▌9. Farish C. Tate (D)
▌10. William H. Fleming (D)
▌11. William G. Brantley (D)

==== Idaho ====
▌At-large. Thomas L. Glenn (P)

==== Illinois ====
▌1. James R. Mann (R)
▌2. John J. Feely (D)
▌3. George P. Foster (D)
▌4. James McAndrews (D)
▌5. William Frank Mahoney (D)
▌6. Henry S. Boutell (R)
▌7. George E. Foss (R)
▌8. Albert J. Hopkins (R)
▌9. Robert R. Hitt (R)
▌10. George W. Prince (R)
▌11. Walter Reeves (R)
▌12. Joseph G. Cannon (R)
▌13. Vespasian Warner (R)
▌14. Joseph V. Graff (R)
▌15. J. Ross Mickey (D)
▌16. Thomas J. Selby (D)
▌17. Ben F. Caldwell (D)
▌18. Thomas M. Jett (D)
▌19. Joseph B. Crowley (D)
▌20. James R. Williams (D)
▌21. Fred J. Kern (D)
▌22. George Washington Smith (R)

==== Indiana ====
▌1. James A. Hemenway (R)
▌2. Robert W. Miers (D)
▌3. William T. Zenor (D)
▌4. Francis M. Griffith (D)
▌5. Elias S. Holliday (R)
▌6. James E. Watson (R)
▌7. Jesse Overstreet (R)
▌8. George W. Cromer (R)
▌9. Charles B. Landis (R)
▌10. Edgar D. Crumpacker (R)
▌11. George W. Steele (R)
▌12. James M. Robinson (D)
▌13. Abraham L. Brick (R)

==== Iowa ====
▌1. Thomas Hedge (R)
▌2. John N. W. Rumple (R), until January 31, 1903
▌3. David B. Henderson (R)
▌4. Gilbert N. Haugen (R)
▌5. Robert G. Cousins (R)
▌6. John F. Lacey (R)
▌7. John A. T. Hull (R)
▌8. William P. Hepburn (R)
▌9. Walter I. Smith (R)
▌10. James P. Conner (R)
▌11. Lot Thomas (R)

==== Kansas ====
▌1. Charles Curtis (R)
▌2. Justin De Witt Bowersock (R)
▌3. Alfred Metcalf Jackson (D)
▌4. James Monroe Miller (R)
▌5. William A. Calderhead (R)
▌6. William A. Reeder (R)
▌7. Chester I. Long (R), until March 4, 1903
▌At-large. Charles Frederick Scott (R)

==== Kentucky ====
▌1. Charles K. Wheeler (D)
▌2. Henry Dixon Allen (D)
▌3. John S. Rhea (D), until March 25, 1902

▌J. McKenzie Moss (R), from March 25, 1902

▌4. David Highbaugh Smith (D)
▌5. Harvey Samuel Irwin (R)
▌6. Daniel Linn Gooch (D)
▌7. South Trimble (D)
▌8. George G. Gilbert (D)
▌9. James Nicholas Kehoe (D)
▌10. James Bramford White (D)
▌11. Vincent Boreing (R)

==== Louisiana ====
▌1. Adolph Meyer (D)
▌2. Robert C. Davey (D)
▌3. Robert F. Broussard (D)
▌4. Phanor Breazeale (D)
▌5. Joseph E. Ransdell (D)
▌6. Samuel M. Robertson (D)

==== Maine ====
▌1. Amos L. Allen (R)
▌2. Charles E. Littlefield (R)
▌3. Edwin C. Burleigh (R)
▌4. Llewellyn Powers (R), from April 8, 1901

==== Maryland ====
▌1. William Humphreys Jackson (R)
▌2. Albert Blakeney (R)
▌3. Frank C. Wachter (R)
▌4. Charles R. Schirm (R)
▌5. Sydney E. Mudd (R)
▌6. George A. Pearre (R)

==== Massachusetts ====
▌1. George P. Lawrence (R)
▌2. Frederick H. Gillett (R)
▌3. John R. Thayer (D)
▌4. Charles Q. Tirrell (R)
▌5. William S. Knox (R)
▌6. William H. Moody (R), until May 1, 1902

▌Augustus P. Gardner (R), from November 4, 1902

▌7. Ernest W. Roberts (R)
▌8. Samuel W. McCall (R)
▌9. Joseph A. Conry (D)
▌10. Henry F. Naphen (D)
▌11. Samuel L. Powers (R)
▌12. William C. Lovering (R)
▌13. William S. Greene (R)

==== Michigan ====
▌1. John B. Corliss (R)
▌2. Henry C. Smith (R)
▌3. Washington Gardner (R)
▌4. Edward L. Hamilton (R)
▌5. William Alden Smith (R)
▌6. Samuel W. Smith (R)
▌7. Edgar Weeks (R)
▌8. Joseph W. Fordney (R)
▌9. Roswell P. Bishop (R)
▌10. Rousseau O. Crump (R), until May 1, 1901

▌Henry H. Aplin (R), from October 15, 1901

▌11. Archibald B. Darragh (R)
▌12. Carlos D. Shelden (R)

==== Minnesota ====
▌1. James Albertus Tawney (R)
▌2. James T. McCleary (R)
▌3. Joel Heatwole (R)
▌4. Frederick C. Stevens (R)
▌5. Loren Fletcher (R)
▌6. R. Page W. Morris (R)
▌7. Frank Eddy (R)

==== Mississippi ====
▌1. Ezekiel S. Candler Jr. (D)
▌2. Thomas Spight (D)
▌3. Patrick Stevens Henry (D)
▌4. Andrew F. Fox (D)
▌5. John Sharp Williams (D)
▌6. Frank A. McLain (D)
▌7. Charles E. Hooker (D)

==== Missouri ====
▌1. James T. Lloyd (D)
▌2. William W. Rucker (D)
▌3. John Dougherty (D)
▌4. Charles F. Cochran (D)
▌5. William S. Cowherd (D)
▌6. David A. De Armond (D)
▌7. James Cooney (D)
▌8. Dorsey W. Shackleford (D)
▌9. James Beauchamp Clark (D)
▌10. Richard Bartholdt (R)
▌11. Charles F. Joy (R)
▌12. James Joseph Butler (D), until June 28, 1902, then November 4, 1902 – February 26, 1903

▌George Wagoner (R), from February 26, 1903

▌13. Edward Robb (D)
▌14. Willard D. Vandiver (D)
▌15. Maecenas E. Benton (D)

==== Montana ====
▌At-large. Caldwell Edwards (P)

==== Nebraska ====
▌1. Elmer J. Burkett (R)
▌2. David H. Mercer (R)
▌3. John S. Robinson (D)
▌4. William L. Stark (P)
▌5. Ashton C. Shallenberger (D)
▌6. William Neville (P)

==== Nevada ====
▌At-large. Francis G. Newlands (D)

==== New Hampshire ====
▌1. Cyrus A. Sulloway (R)
▌2. Frank Dunklee Currier (R)

==== New Jersey ====
▌1. Henry C. Loudenslager (R)
▌2. John J. Gardner (R)
▌3. Benjamin F. Howell (R)
▌4. Joshua S. Salmon (D), until May 6, 1902

▌De Witt C. Flanagan (D), from June 18, 1902

▌5. James F. Stewart (R)
▌6. Richard Wayne Parker (R)
▌7. Allan L. McDermott (D)
▌8. Charles N. Fowler (R)

==== New York ====
▌1. Frederic Storm (R)
▌2. John J. Fitzgerald (D)
▌3. Henry Bristow (R)
▌4. Harry A. Hanbury (R)
▌5. Frank E. Wilson (D)
▌6. George H. Lindsay (D)
▌7. Nicholas Muller (D), until November 22, 1901

▌Montague Lessler (R), from January 7, 1902

▌8. Thomas J. Creamer (D)
▌9. Henry M. Goldfogle (D)
▌10. Amos J. Cummings (D), until May 2, 1902

▌Edward Swann (D), from November 4, 1902

▌11. William Sulzer (D)
▌12. George B. McClellan Jr. (D)
▌13. Oliver Belmont (D)
▌14. William H. Douglas (R)
▌15. Jacob Ruppert (D)
▌16. Cornelius A. Pugsley (D)
▌17. Arthur S. Tompkins (R)
▌18. John H. Ketcham (R)
▌19. William H. Draper (R)
▌20. George N. Southwick (R)
▌21. John Knox Stewart (R)
▌22. Lucius N. Littauer (R)
▌23. Louis W. Emerson (R)
▌24. Charles L. Knapp (R), from November 5, 1901
▌25. James S. Sherman (R)
▌26. George W. Ray (R), until September 11, 1902

▌John W. Dwight (R), from November 4, 1902

▌27. Michael E. Driscoll (R)
▌28. Sereno E. Payne (R)
▌29. Charles W. Gillet (R)
▌30. James W. Wadsworth (R)
▌31. James B. Perkins (R)
▌32. William H. Ryan (D)
▌33. De Alva S. Alexander (R)
▌34. Edward B. Vreeland (R)

==== North Carolina ====
▌1. John Humphrey Small (D)
▌2. Claude Kitchin (D)
▌3. Charles R. Thomas (D)
▌4. Edward W. Pou (D)
▌5. William W. Kitchin (D)
▌6. John D. Bellamy (D)
▌7. Theodore F. Kluttz (D)
▌8. E. Spencer Blackburn (R)
▌9. James M. Moody (R), until February 5, 1903

==== North Dakota ====
▌At-large. Thomas Frank Marshall (R)

==== Ohio ====
▌1. William B. Shattuc (R)
▌2. Jacob H. Bromwell (R)
▌3. Robert M. Nevin (R)
▌4. Robert B. Gordon (D)
▌5. John S. Snook (D)
▌6. Charles Q. Hildebrant (R)
▌7. Thomas B. Kyle (R)
▌8. William R. Warnock (R)
▌9. James H. Southard (R)
▌10. Stephen Morgan (R)
▌11. Charles H. Grosvenor (R)
▌12. Emmett Tompkins (R)
▌13. James A. Norton (D)
▌14. William W. Skiles (R)
▌15. Henry C. Van Voorhis (R)
▌16. John J. Gill (R)
▌17. John W. Cassingham (D)
▌18. Robert W. Tayler (R)
▌19. Charles W. F. Dick (R)
▌20. Jacob A. Beidler (R)
▌21. Theodore E. Burton (R)

==== Oregon ====
▌1. Thomas H. Tongue (R), until January 11, 1903
▌2. Malcolm A. Moody (R)

==== Pennsylvania ====
▌1. Henry H. Bingham (R)
▌2. Robert Adams Jr. (R)
▌3. Henry Burk (R)
▌4. James R. Young (R)
▌5. Edward D. Morrell (R)
▌6. Thomas S. Butler (R)
▌7. Irving P. Wanger (R)
▌8. Howard Mutchler (D)
▌9. Henry D. Green (D)
▌10. Marriott Brosius (R), until March 16, 1901

▌Henry B. Cassel (R), from November 5, 1901

▌11. William Connell (R)
▌12. Henry W. Palmer (R)
▌13. George R. Patterson (R)
▌14. Marlin E. Olmsted (R)
▌15. Charles F. Wright (R)
▌16. Elias Deemer (R)
▌17. Rufus K. Polk (D), until March 5, 1902

▌Alexander Billmeyer (D), from November 4, 1902

▌18. Thaddeus M. Mahon (R)
▌19. Robert Jacob Lewis (R)
▌20. Alvin Evans (R)
▌21. Summers M. Jack (R)
▌22. John Dalzell (R)
▌23. William H. Graham (R)
▌24. Ernest F. Acheson (R)
▌25. Joseph B. Showalter (R)
▌26. Arthur L. Bates (R)
▌27. Joseph C. Sibley (R)
▌28. James K. P. Hall (D), until November 29, 1902
▌At-large. Galusha A. Grow (R)
▌At-large. Robert H. Foerderer (R)

==== Rhode Island ====
▌1. Melville Bull (R)
▌2. Adin B. Capron (R)

==== South Carolina ====
▌1. William Elliott (D)
▌2. William J. Talbert (D)
▌3. Asbury C. Latimer (D)
▌4. Joseph T. Johnson (D)
▌5. David E. Finley (D)
▌6. Robert B. Scarborough (D)
▌7. J. William Stokes (D), until July 6, 1901

▌Asbury F. Lever (D), from November 5, 1901

==== South Dakota ====
▌At-large. Charles H. Burke (R)
▌At-large. Eben W. Martin (R)

==== Tennessee ====
▌1. Walter P. Brownlow (R)
▌2. Henry R. Gibson (R)
▌3. John A. Moon (D)
▌4. Charles E. Snodgrass (D)
▌5. James D. Richardson (D)
▌6. John W. Gaines (D)
▌7. Lemuel P. Padgett (D)
▌8. Thetus W. Sims (D)
▌9. Rice A. Pierce (D)
▌10. Malcolm R. Patterson (D)

==== Texas ====
▌1. Thomas H. Ball (D)
▌2. Samuel B. Cooper (D)
▌3. Reese C. De Graffenreid (D), until August 29, 1902

▌Gordon J. Russell (D), from November 4, 1902

▌4. John L. Sheppard (D), until October 11, 1902

▌Morris Sheppard (D), from November 15, 1902

▌5. Choice B. Randell (D)
▌6. Robert E. Burke (D), until June 5, 1901

▌Dudley G. Wooten (D), from July 13, 1901

▌7. Robert L. Henry (D)
▌8. Samuel W. T. Lanham (D), until January 15, 1903
▌9. Albert S. Burleson (D)
▌10. George Farmer Burgess (D)
▌11. Rudolph Kleberg (D)
▌12. James L. Slayden (D)
▌13. John H. Stephens (D)

==== Utah ====
▌At-large. George Sutherland (R)

==== Vermont ====
▌1. David J. Foster (R)
▌2. Kittredge Haskins (R)

==== Virginia ====
▌1. William A. Jones (D)
▌2. Harry L. Maynard (D)
▌3. John Lamb (D)
▌4. Francis R. Lassiter (D)
▌5. Claude A. Swanson (D)
▌6. Peter J. Otey (D), until May 4, 1902

▌Carter Glass (D), from November 4, 1902

▌7. James Hay (D)
▌8. John F. Rixey (D)
▌9. William F. Rhea (D)
▌10. Henry D. Flood (D)

==== Washington ====
▌At-large. Francis W. Cushman (R)
▌At-large. Wesley L. Jones (R)

==== West Virginia ====
▌1. Blackburn B. Dovener (R)
▌2. Alston G. Dayton (R)
▌3. Joseph Holt Gaines (R)
▌4. James Anthony Hughes (R)

==== Wisconsin ====
▌1. Henry Allen Cooper (R)
▌2. Herman B. Dahle (R)
▌3. Joseph W. Babcock (R)
▌4. Theobald Otjen (R)
▌5. Samuel S. Barney (R)
▌6. James H. Davidson (R)
▌7. John J. Esch (R)
▌8. Edward S. Minor (R)
▌9. Webster E. Brown (R)
▌10. John J. Jenkins (R)

==== Wyoming ====
▌At-large. Frank W. Mondell (R)

==== Non-voting members ====
▌Arizona Territory. Marcus Aurelius Smith (D)
▌Hawaii Territory. Robert W. Wilcox (I)
▌New Mexico Territory. Bernard Shandon Rodey (R)
▌Oklahoma Territory. Dennis T. Flynn (R)
▌Puerto Rico. Federico Degetau (Resident Commissioner) (R)

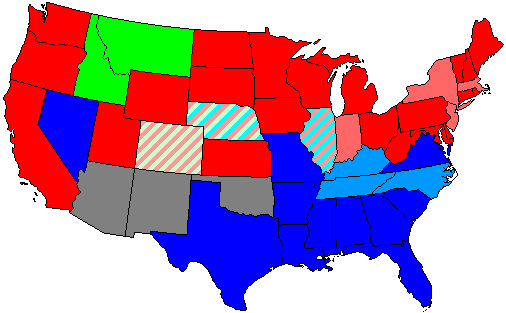
House seats by party holding plurality in state: 80+% to 100% Democratic / 80+% to 100% Republican; 60+% to 80% Democratic / 60+% to 80% Republican; Up to 60% Democratic / Up to 60% Republican

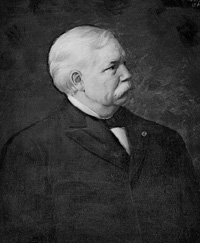
Speaker of the House David B. Henderson

== Changes in membership ==
The count below reflects changes from the beginning of the first session of this Congress.

=== Senate ===
Note:Delaware's Class 1 Senate seat remained vacant for entire Congress due to the legislature's failure to elect.

- Replacements: 4
  - Democratic: 1 seat gain
  - Republican: 3 seat gain
  - Populist: 1 seat loss
- Deaths: 3
- Resignations: 0
- Vacancy: 1
- Total seats with changes: 6

State (class)	Vacated by	Reason for vacancy	Subsequent	Date of successor's installation
Montana (1)	Vacant	Senator William A. Clark vacated his seat during previous congress. Successor was elected March 7, 1901.	Paris Gibson (D)	March 7, 1901
Delaware (1)	Vacant	Seat remained vacant as Legislature failed to elect to fill vacancy in term. Senator was elected March 2, 1903 for the term ending March 4, 1905.	L. Heisler Ball (R)	March 2, 1903
Delaware (2)	Vacant	Legislature failed to elect to fill vacancy in term. Senator was elected March 2, 1903 for the term ending March 4, 1907.	J. Frank Allee (R)	March 2, 1903
Nebraska (2)	Vacant	Legislature failed to elect to fill vacancy in term. Successor was elected March 28, 1901.	Joseph Millard (R)	March 28, 1901
Nebraska (1)	William V. Allen (Pop.)	Interim appointee did not run to finish the term. Successor was elected March 28, 1901. Successor delayed taking seat until December 2, 1901, after resigning as Governor of Nebraska on May 1, 1901, but his service began on the date of his election, March 28, 1901.	Charles H. Dietrich (R)	December 2, 1901
South Dakota (3)	James H. Kyle (R)	Died July 1, 1901. Successor was appointed July 11, 1901, to continue the term and subsequently elected January 20, 1903, to finish the term.	Alfred B. Kittredge (R)	July 11, 1901
New Jersey (2)	William J. Sewell (R)	Died December 27, 1901. Successor was elected.	John F. Dryden (R)	January 29, 1902
Michigan (2)	James McMillan (R)	Died August 10, 1902. Successor was appointed September 27, 1902, to continue the term and subsequently elected December 7, 1902, to finish the term..	Russell A. Alger (R)	September 27, 1902

=== House of Representatives ===
- Replacements: 17
  - Democratic: 3 seat loss
  - Republican: 3 seat gain
- Deaths: 14
- Resignations: 5
- Contested elections: 2
- Total seats with changes: 24

District	Previous	Reason for change	Subsequent	Date of successor's installation
Maine 4th	Vacant	Rep. Charles A. Boutelle resigned during previous congress	Llewellyn Powers (R)	April 8, 1901
New York 24th	Vacant	Rep. Albert D. Shaw died during previous congress	Charles L. Knapp (R)	November 5, 1901
Pennsylvania 10th	Marriott H. Brosius (R)	Died March 16, 1901	Henry B. Cassel (R)	November 5, 1901
Michigan 10th	Rousseau O. Crump (R)	Died May 1, 1901	Henry H. Aplin (R)	October 15, 1901
Texas 6th	Robert E. Burke (D)	Died June 5, 1901.	Dudley G. Wooten (D)	July 13, 1901
South Carolina 7th	J. William Stokes (D)	Died July 6, 1901.	Asbury F. Lever (D)	July 13, 1901
New York 7th	Nicholas Muller (D)	Resigned November 22, 1901.	Montague Lessler (R)	January 7, 1902
Pennsylvania 17th	Rufus K. Polk (D)	Died March 5, 1902.	Alexander Billmeyer (D)	November 4, 1902
Kentucky 3rd	John S. Rhea (D)	Lost contested election March 25, 1902	J. McKenzie Moss (R)	March 25, 1902
Massachusetts 6th	William H. Moody (R)	Resigned May 1, 1902, after being appointed U.S. Secretary of the Navy	Augustus P. Gardner (R)	November 4, 1902
Missouri 12th	James J. Butler (D)	Seat declared vacant May 1, 1902. Butler elected to fill his own vacancy.	James J. Butler (D)	November 4, 1902
New York 10th	Amos J. Cummings (D)	Died May 2, 1902.	Edward Swann (D)	November 4, 1902
Virginia 6th	Peter J. Otey (D)	Died May 4, 1902.	Carter Glass (D)	November 4, 1902
New Jersey 4th	Joshua S. Salmon (D)	Died May 6, 1902.	De Witt C. Flanagan (D)	June 18, 1902
Texas 3rd	Reese C. De Graffenreid (D)	Died August 29, 1902.	Gordon J. Russell (D)	November 4, 1902
New York 26th	George W. Ray (R)	Resigned September 11, 1902, after being appointed judge for the United States District Court for the Northern District of New York	John W. Dwight (R)	November 4, 1902
Texas 4th	John L. Sheppard (D)	Died October 11, 1902.	Morris Sheppard (D)	November 15, 1902
Connecticut 3rd	Charles A. Russell (R)	Died October 23, 1902	Frank B. Brandegee (R)	November 4, 1902
Pennsylvania 28th	James K. P. Hall (D)	Resigned November 29, 1902	Seat remained vacant until next Congress	
Oregon 1st	Thomas H. Tongue (R)	Died January 11, 1903.	Seat remained vacant until next Congress	
Texas 8th	S. W. T. Lanham (D)	Resigned January 15, 1903, after being elected Governor of Texas	Seat remained vacant until next Congress	
Iowa 2nd	John N. W. Rumple (R)	Died January 31, 1903	Seat remained vacant until next Congress	
North Carolina 9th	James M. Moody (R)	Died February 5, 1903.	Seat remained vacant until next Congress	
Missouri 12th	James J. Butler (D)	Lost contested election February 26, 1903.	George C. R. Wagoner (R)	February 26, 1903
Kansas 7th	Chester I. Long (R)	Resigned March 4, 1903, after becoming U.S. Senator	Seat remained vacant until next Congress	

== Committees ==
Lists of committees and their party leaders for members of the House and Senate committees can be found through the Official Congressional Directory at the bottom of this article. The directory after the pages of terms of service lists committees of the Senate, House (Standing with Subcommittees, Select and Special) and Joint and, after that, House/Senate committee assignments. On the committees section of the House and Senate in the Official Congressional Directory, the committee's members on the first row on the left side shows the chairman of the committee and on the right side shows the ranking member of the committee.

=== Senate ===
- Additional Accommodations for the Library of Congress (Select) (Chairman: James H. Berry; Ranking Member: Shelby M. Cullom)
- Agriculture and Forestry (Chairman: Redfield Proctor; Ranking Member: William B. Bate)
- Appropriations (Chairman: William B. Allison; Ranking Member: Francis M. Cockrell)
- Audit and Control the Contingent Expenses of the Senate (Chairman: John P. Jones; Ranking Member: Hernando D. Money)
- Canadian Relations (Chairman: John F. Dryden)
- Census (Chairman: Joseph V. Quarles; Ranking Member: Samuel D. McEnery)
- Civil Service and Retrenchment (Chairman: George C. Perkins; Ranking Member: William A. Harris)
- Claims (Chairman: Francis E. Warren; Ranking Member: Henry M. Teller)
- Coast and Insular Survey (Chairman: Addison G. Foster; Ranking Member: John Tyler Morgan)
- Coast Defenses (Chairman: John H. Mitchell; Ranking Member: George Turner)
- Commerce (Chairman: William P. Frye; Ranking Member: John P. Jones)
- Corporations Organized in the District of Columbia (Chairman: Thomas S. Martin; Ranking Member: Nelson W. Aldrich)
- Cuban Relations (Chairman: Orville H. Platt; Ranking Member: Henry M. Teller)
- Distributing Public Revenue Among the States (Select)
- District of Columbia (Chairman: James McMillan; Ranking Member: Thomas S. Martin)
- Education and Labor (Chairman: Louis E. McComas; Ranking Member: John W. Daniel)
- Engrossed Bills (Chairman: Francis M. Cockrell; Ranking Member: George F. Hoar)
- Enrolled Bills (Chairman: Mark Hanna; Ranking Member: Murphy J. Foster)
- Establish a University in the United States (Select) (Chairman: William J. Deboe; Ranking Member: James K. Jones)
- Examination and Disposition of Documents (Select) (Chairman: Russell A. Alger)
- Examine the Several Branches in the Civil Service (Chairman: Moses E. Clapp; Ranking Member: Henry Heitfeld)
- Expenditures in Executive Departments
- Finance (Chairman: Nelson W. Aldrich; Ranking Member: George G. Vest)
- Fisheries (Chairman: Thomas R. Bard; Ranking Member: George Turner)
- Five Civilized Tribes of Indians (Select) (Chairman: William B. Bate; Ranking Member: Joseph R. Burton)
- Foreign Relations (Chairman: Shelby M. Cullom; Ranking Member: John T. Morgan)
- Forest Reservations and the Protection of Game (Chairman: Joseph R. Burton; Ranking Member: John T. Morgan)
- Geological Survey (Chairman: John Kean; Ranking Member: Hernando D. Money)
- Immigration (Chairman: Boies Penrose; Ranking Member: Joseph L. Rawlins)
- Indian Affairs (Chairman: William M. Stewart; Ranking Member: John L. McLaurin)
- Indian Depredations (Chairman: Robert J. Gamble; Ranking Member: Augustus O. Bacon)
- Industrial Expositions (Chairman: Henry E. Burnham; Ranking Member: John L. McLaurin)
- Investigate the Condition of the Potomac River Front at Washington (Select) (Chairman: Joseph H. Millard)
- Indian Territory (Select)
- Interoceanic Canals (Chairman: John Tyler Morgan; Ranking Member: Joseph R. Hawley)
- Interstate Commerce (Chairman: Stephen B. Elkins; Ranking Member: Benjamin R. Tillman)
- Irrigation and Reclamation of Arid Lands (Chairman: Joseph Simon; Ranking Member: William A. Harris)
- Judiciary (Chairman: George F. Hoar; Ranking Member: Augustus O. Bacon)
- Library (Chairman: George P. Wetmore; Ranking Member: George G. Vest)
- Manufactures (Chairman: Porter J. McCumber; Ranking Member: John L. McLaurin)
- Military Affairs (Chairman: Joseph R. Hawley; Ranking Member: William B. Bate)
- Mines and Mining (Chairman: Nathan B. Scott; Ranking Member: Benjamin R. Tillman)
- Mississippi River and its Tributaries (Select) (Chairman: Knute Nelson)
- National Banks (Select) (Chairman: Thomas Kearns; Ranking Member: Samuel D. McEnery)
- Naval Affairs (Chairman: Eugene Hale; Ranking Member: Benjamin R. Tillman)
- Organization, Conduct and Expenditures of the Executive Departments (Chairman: Matthew S. Quay; Ranking Member: John L. McLaurin)
- Pacific Islands and Puerto Rico (Chairman: Joseph B. Foraker; Ranking Member: Francis M. Cockrell)
- Pacific Railroads (Chairman: Jonathan P. Dolliver; Ranking Member: John T. Morgan)
- Patents (Chairman: Jeter C. Pritchard; Ranking Member: Stephen R. Mallory)
- Pensions (Chairman: Jacob H. Gallinger; Ranking Member: George Turner)
- Philippines (Chairman: Henry Cabot Lodge; Ranking Member: Joseph L. Rawlins)
- Post Office and Post Roads (Chairman: William E. Mason; Ranking Member: Alexander S. Clay)
- Potomac River Front (Select)
- Printing (Chairman: Thomas C. Platt; Ranking Member: James K. Jones)
- Private Land Claims (Chairman: Henry M. Teller; Ranking Member: Eugene Hale)
- Privileges and Elections (Chairman: Julius C. Burrows; Ranking Member: Edmund W. Pettus)
- Public Buildings and Grounds (Chairman: Charles W. Fairbanks; Ranking Member: George G. Vest)
- Public Health and National Quarantine (Chairman: George G. Vest; Ranking Member: John P. Jones)
- Public Lands (Chairman: Henry C. Hansbrough; Ranking Member: James H. Berry)
- Railroads (Chairman: Clarence D. Clark; Ranking Member: Augustus O. Bacon)
- Revision of the Laws (Chairman: Chauncey M. Depew; Ranking Member: John W. Daniel)
- Revolutionary Claims (Chairman: Benjamin R. Tillman; Ranking Member: Joseph Simon)
- Rules (Chairman: John C. Spooner; Ranking Member: Henry M. Teller)
- Standards, Weights and Measures (Select) (Chairman: Alfred B. Kittredge; Ranking Member: Henry M. Teller)
- Tariff Regulation (Select)
- Territories (Chairman: Albert J. Beveridge; Ranking Member: William B. Bate)
- Transportation and Sale of Meat Products (Select) (Chairman: John W. Daniel; Ranking Member: Porter J. McCumber)
- Transportation Routes to the Seaboard (Chairman: William P. Dillingham; Ranking Member: John L. McLaurin)
- Trespassers upon Indian Lands (Select) (Chairman: Charles H. Dietrich; Ranking Member: John T. Morgan)
- Ventilation and Acoustics (Select) (Chairman: L. Heisler Ball)
- Whole
- Woman Suffrage (Select) (Chairman: Augustus O. Bacon; Ranking Member: George P. Wetmore)

=== House of Representatives ===
- Accounts (Chairman: Melville Bull; Ranking Member: Charles L. Bartlett)
- Agriculture (Chairman: James W. Wadsworth; Ranking Member: John S. Williams)
- Alcoholic Liquor Traffic (Chairman: Nehemiah D. Sperry; Ranking Member: John L. Burnett)
- Appropriations (Chairman: Joseph G. Cannon; Ranking Member: Leonidas F. Livingston)
- Banking and Currency (Chairman: Charles N. Fowler; Ranking Member: W. Jasper Talbert)
- Census (Chairman: Albert J. Hopkins; Ranking Member: Francis M. Griffith)
- Claims (Chairman: Joseph V. Graff; Ranking Member: Peter J. Otey)
- Coinage, Weights and Measures (Chairman: James H. Southard; Ranking Member: Charles F. Cochran)
- Disposition of Executive Papers (Chairman: Edward S. Minor; Ranking Member: Charles F. Cochran)
- District of Columbia (Chairman: Joseph W. Babcock; Ranking Member: Adolph Meyer)
- Education (Chairman: Galusha A. Grow; Ranking Member: David A. De Armond)
- Election of the President, Vice President and Representatives in Congress (Chairman: John B. Corliss; Ranking Member: William W. Rucker)
- Elections No.#1 (Chairman: Robert W. Tayler; Ranking Member: Andrew F. Fox)
- Elections No.#2 (Chairman: Marlin E. Olmsted; Ranking Member: James M. Robinson)
- Elections No.#3 (Chairman: Edgar Weeks; Ranking Member: Frank A. McLain)
- Enrolled Bills (Chairman: Frank C. Wachter; Ranking Member: James T. Lloyd)
- Expenditures in the Agriculture Department (Chairman: Charles W. Gillet; Ranking Member: Henry D. Flood)
- Expenditures in the Commerce and Labor Departments (Chairman: David J. Foster; Ranking Member: N/A)
- Expenditures in the Interior Department (Chairman: Charles Curtis; Ranking Member: Henry D. Green)
- Expenditures in the Justice Department (Chairman: Jesse Overstreet; Ranking Member: Henry M. Goldfogle)
- Expenditures in the Navy Department (Chairman: James F. Stewart; Ranking Member: Charles W. Thompson)
- Expenditures in the Post Office Department (Chairman: Irving P. Wanger; Ranking Member: Edward Robb)
- Expenditures in the State Department (Chairman: John H. Ketcham; Ranking Member: Rufus E. Lester)
- Expenditures in the Treasury Department (Chairman: Robert G. Cousins; Ranking Member: John Lamb)
- Expenditures in the War Department (Chairman: Charles A. Russell; Ranking Member: William L. Stark)
- Expenditures on Public Buildings (Chairman: Loren Fletcher; Ranking Member: John H. Small)
- Foreign Affairs (Chairman: Robert R. Hitt; Ranking Member: Hugh A. Dinsmore)
- Immigration and Naturalization (Chairman: William B. Shattuc; Ranking Member: Peter J. Otey)
- Indian Affairs (Chairman: James S. Sherman; Ranking Member: John S. Little)
- Industrial Arts and Expositions (Chairman: James A. Tawney; Ranking Member: Charles L. Bartlett)
- Insular Affairs (Chairman: Henry Allen Cooper; Ranking Member: William A. Jones)
- Interstate and Foreign Commerce (Chairman: William P. Hepburn; Ranking Member: Robert C. Davey)
- Invalid Pensions (Chairman: Cyrus A. Sulloway; Ranking Member: Robert W. Miers)
- Irrigation of Arid Lands (Chairman: Thomas H. Tongue; Ranking Member: Francis G. Newlands)
- Judiciary (Chairman: George W. Ray; Ranking Member: David A. De Armond)
- Labor (Chairman: John J. Gardner; Ranking Member: W. Jasper Talbert)
- Levees and Improvements of the Mississippi River (Chairman: Richard Bartholdt; Ranking Member: Robert F. Broussard)
- Library (Chairman: James T. McCleary; Ranking Member: Amos J. Cummings then Dudley G. Wooten)
- Manufactures (Chairman: George W. Steele; Ranking Member: Willard D. Vandiver)
- Merchant Marine and Fisheries (Chairman: Charles H. Grosvenor; Ranking Member: Thomas Spight)
- Mileage (Chairman: William A. Reeder; Ranking Member: Elijah B. Lewis)
- Military Affairs (Chairman: John A.T. Hull; Ranking Member: William Sulzer)
- Militia (Chairman: Charles Dick; Ranking Member: William L. Stark)
- Mines and Mining (Chairman: Frank M. Eddy; Ranking Member: Farish Carter Tate)
- Naval Affairs (Chairman: George E. Foss; Ranking Member: Amos J. Cummings)
- Pacific Railroads (Chairman: William A. Smith; Ranking Member: James L. Slayden)
- Patents (Chairman: Walter Reeves; Ranking Member: William Sulzer)
- Pensions (Chairman: Henry C. Loudenslager; Ranking Member: Reese C. De Graffenreid)
- Post Office and Post Roads (Chairman: Eugene F. Loud; Ranking Member: Claude A. Swanson)
- Printing (Chairman: Joel P. Heatwole; Ranking Member: Farish Carter Tate)
- Private Land Claims (Chairman: George W. Smith; Ranking Member: William A. Jones)
- Public Buildings and Grounds (Chairman: David H. Mercer; Ranking Member: John H. Bankhead)
- Public Lands (Chairman: John F. Lacey; Ranking Member: John F. Shafroth)
- Railways and Canals (Chairman: James H. Davidson; Ranking Member: Reese C. De Graffenreid)
- Reform in the Civil Service (Chairman: Frederick H. Gillett; Ranking Member: William Elliott)
- Revision of Laws (Chairman: Vespasian Warner; Ranking Member: John S. Robinson)
- Rivers and Harbors (Chairman: Theodore E. Burton; Ranking Member: Rufus E. Lester)
- Rules (Chairman: John Dalzell; Ranking Member: James D. Richardson)
- Standards of Official Conduct
- Territories (Chairman: William S. Knox; Ranking Member: John A. Moon)
- Ventilation and Acoustics (Chairman: Roswell P. Bishop; Ranking Member: David H. Smith)
- War Claims (Chairman: Thaddeus M. Mahon; Ranking Member: Thetus W. Sims)
- Ways and Means (Chairman: Sereno E. Payne; Ranking Member: James D. Richardson)
- Whole

=== Joint committees ===
- Conditions of Indian Tribes (Special)
- Disposition of (Useless) Executive Papers
- The Library
- Printing

== Caucuses ==
- Democratic (House)
- Democratic (Senate)

== Employees ==
=== Legislative branch agency directors ===
- Architect of the Capitol: Edward Clark, died January 6, 1902.
  - Elliott Woods, appointed February 19, 1902.
- Librarian of Congress: Herbert Putnam
- Public Printer of the United States: Francis W. Palmer

=== Senate ===
- Secretary: Charles G. Bennett
- Sergeant at Arms: Daniel M. Ransdell
- Librarian: Cliff Warden
- Chaplain: William H. Millburn, Methodist, until December 2, 1902.
  - F.J. Prettyman, Methodist, elected December 2, 1902.

=== House of Representatives ===
- Clerk: Alexander McDowell
- Sergeant at Arms: Henry Casson
- Doorkeeper: William J. Glenn, until March 12, 1902
  - Frank B. Lyon, elected March 18, 1902
- Postmaster: Joseph C. McElroy
- Reading Clerks: E. L. Lampson (D) and Dennis E. Alward (R)
- Clerk at the Speaker's Table: Asher C. Hinds
- Chaplain: Henry N. Couden, Universalist

== See also ==
- 1900 United States elections (elections leading to this Congress)
  - 1900 United States presidential election
  - 1900–01 United States Senate elections
  - 1900 United States House of Representatives elections
- 1902 United States elections (elections during this Congress, leading to the next Congress)
  - 1902–03 United States Senate elections
  - 1902 United States House of Representatives elections
