= John L. Wilson =

American politician (1850–1912)

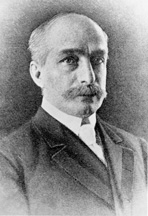

United States Senator from Washington
- In office February 19, 1895 – March 3, 1899
- Preceded by: John B. Allen
- Succeeded by: Addison G. Foster

Member of the U.S. House of Representatives from Washington's at-large district
- In office November 20, 1889 – February 18, 1895
- Preceded by: District created
- Succeeded by: Samuel C. Hyde

Member of the Indiana House of Representatives from Montgomery County
- In office January 6, 1881 – January 3, 1883
- Preceded by: Maurice Thompson
- Succeeded by: John W. Straughan

Personal details
- Born: John Lockwood Wilson; August 7, 1850 Crawfordsville, Indiana, US
- Died: November 6, 1912 (aged 62) Washington, D.C., US
- Party: Republican
- Spouse: Edna Sweet
- Children: 1
- Education: Wabash College (AM)
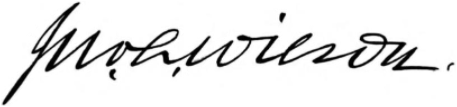
- Signature

John Lockwood Wilson (August 7, 1850 – November 6, 1912) was an American lawyer and politician from the U.S. states of Indiana and Washington. He served in the U.S. House of Representatives (1889–1895) and U.S. Senate (1895–1899)

== Biography ==
Wilson was born in Crawfordsville, Indiana, the son of James Wilson, a U.S. Representative, and his wife, Emma (Ingersoll) Wilson, and was the elder brother of Henry Lane Wilson. He attended the common schools and was a messenger during the American Civil War. Wilson received his Bachelor of Arts degree from Wabash College in 1874. Wilson's degree was subsequently upgraded to Master of Arts, and in 1907 Wabash College awarded Wilson the honorary degree of LL.D. After college he studied law, being admitted to the bar in 1878. He commenced practice in Crawfordsville and in 1880 was elected to the Indiana House of Representatives. He was appointed by President Chester A. Arthur to the United States General Land Office at Spokane Falls and Colfax in Washington Territory, serving in this position from 1882 to 1887.

Upon the admission of Washington into the Union, Wilson was elected as a Republican in the 1888 elections to the House of Representatives as the representative from Washington's at-large congressional district for the 51st United States Congress. Wilson was re-elected in 1890 and 1892 to the 52nd and 53rd Congresses, serving from November 20, 1889, to February 18, 1895, when he resigned to become a Senator.

Wilson was elected as a Republican to the Senate on February 1, 1895, to fill the vacancy in the term commencing March 4, 1893, but did not assume his senatorial duties until February 19, 1895. He lost his bid for reelection to Addison G. Foster in 1898 and left office on March 3, 1899. While in the Senate, Wilson was chairman of the Committee on Indian Depredations during the 54th and 55th Congresses.

After leaving the Senate, Wilson published the Seattle Post-Intelligencer. He died in Washington, D.C., in 1912 and was interred in Oak Hill Cemetery in Crawfordsville.

U.S. House of Representatives
Preceded by —	Member of the U.S. House of Representatives from Washington's at-large district November 20, 1889 – February 18, 1895	Succeeded by Samuel C. Hyde
U.S. Senate
Preceded by John B. Allen; Vacant	U.S. senator (Class 1) from Washington; February 19, 1895 – March 3, 1899; Served alongside: Watson C. Squire, George Turner	Succeeded by Addison G. Foster
