= Ankeny, Washington =

Ghost town in Washington (state)

- Ghost town
- Location within Washington (state) Location within the United States
- Coordinates: 46°51′00″N 118°09′17″W
- Country: United States
- State: Washington
- County: Adams
- Time zone: UTC-8 (Pacific (PST))
  - Summer (DST): UTC-7 (PDT)

Ankeny was a town in Adams County, Washington. The GNIS classifies it as a populated place.

The community was named after Senator Levi Ankeny.

== See also ==
- List of ghost towns in Washington
