= Samuel C. Hyde =

American politician (1842–1922)

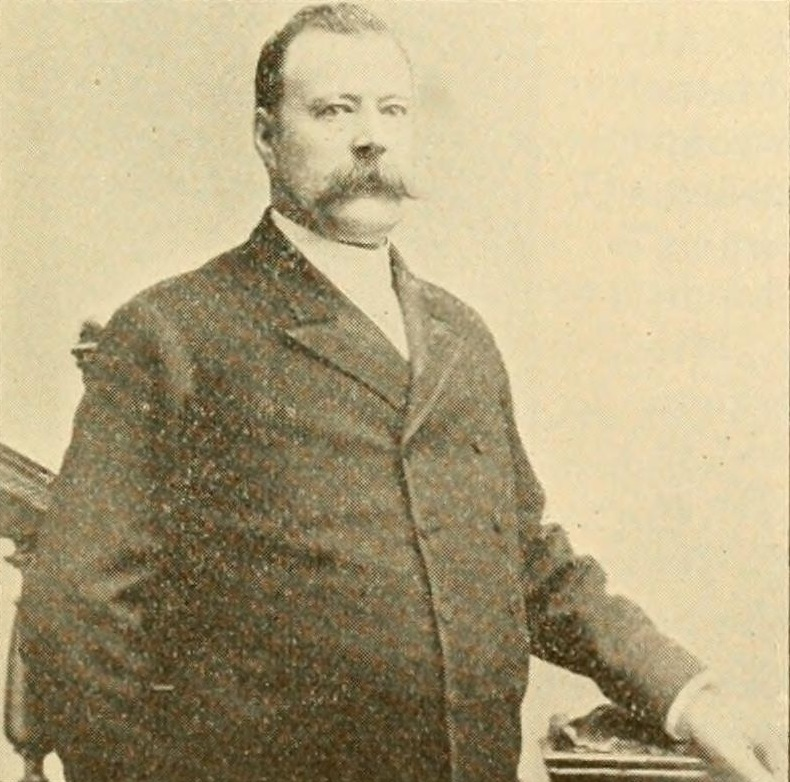
- From 1894's The Oregonian's Handbook of the Pacific Northwest

Member of the United States House of Representatives from Washington's at-large congressional district
- In office March 4, 1895 – March 3, 1897
- Preceded by: John L. Wilson
- Succeeded by: William C. Jones

Prosecuting Attorney of Spokane and Stevens Counties, Washington
- In office 1881–1887
- Preceded by: None (position created)
- Succeeded by: W. C. Jones

Personal details
- Born: April 22, 1842 Ticonderoga, New York
- Died: March 7, 1922 (aged 79) Spokane, Washington
- Resting place: Fairmount Cemetery, Spokane, Washington
- Party: Republican
- Spouse: Mattie A. Rogers (m. 1869-1891, her death)
- Children: 2
- Education: Iowa State University
- Profession: Attorney

Military service
- Allegiance: United States (Union)
- Branch/service: Union Army
- Years of service: 1861-1862
- Rank: Sergeant
- Unit: 17th Wisconsin Volunteer Infantry
- Battles/wars: American Civil War

Samuel C. Hyde (April 22, 1842 – March 7, 1922) was an American attorney and politician from Washington. A Republican, he was most notable for his service as prosecuting attorney of Spokane County from 1880 to 1886 and a member of the United States House of Representatives from 1895 to 1897.

== Early life ==
Samuel Clarence Hyde was born in Ticonderoga, New York on April 22, 1842, a son of Eli N. and Susan S. Hyde. He was a twin, and his sister Salina Clarissa died when she was eight months old. When Hyde was three, his parents relocated to a farm near Oshkosh in Winnebago County, Wisconsin, where Hyde was raised and educated.

== Start of career ==
In December 1861, Hyde enlisted in the Union Army for the American Civil War. He joined Company K, 17th Wisconsin Volunteer Infantry as a private, with his enlistment credited to the town of Utica in Winnebago County. Hyde attained the rank of sergeant and served until July 1862, when he was discharged for disability.

After leaving the army, Hyde worked as an explorer and surveyor of timber and mining lands in Michigan's upper peninsula. In 1871, he began to farm in Lyon County, Iowa. In the early 1870s, he attended Iowa State University, where he studied law. He was admitted to the bar in 1872, and began to practice in Rock Rapids, Iowa. In addition to practicing law, Hyde was publisher of the Lyon County Press newspaper. Hyde also became active in politics as a Republican, and served as chairman of the party's central committee in Lyon County, Iowa.

== Continued career ==
In 1877, Hyde moved to Washington Territory, and he resided and practiced law in both Seattle and Tacoma. In 1879, he relocated to Spokane, where he continued practicing law. As an early resident of Spokane, Hyde was one of its developers, including construction and management of several commercial buildings. In 1881, he was appointed Prosecuting Attorney of Spokane County and Stevens County, and he served in this position for six years.

In 1894, Hyde was the successful Republican nominee for the U.S. House of Representatives from Washington's at-large congressional district. He served in the 54th Congress, March 4, 1895 to March 3, 1897. During his Congressional term, Hyde successfully advocated for construction of the Fort George Wright army base near Spokane. Hyde was an unsuccessful candidate for reelection in 1896 and resumed practicing law in Spokane. He was a longtime justice of the peace and heard cases in Spokane's justice court until retiring for ill health shortly before his death.

== Death and burial ==
Hyde died in Spokane on March 7, 1922. He was buried at Fairmount Cemetery in Spokane. Hyde's funeral took place at Spokane's Central Methodist Church, and he received funeral honors from members of the local Grand Army of the Republic post.

== Family ==
In 1869, Hyde married Mattie A. Rogers (1850-1891) of Rosendale, Wisconsin. They were married until her death, and were the parents of two children, daughter Katherine and son Earl. Hyde's siblings included E. B. Hyde, a Spokane banker and real estate developer who also served in the Washington State Senate.
