= United States Senate Committee on Cuban Relations =

The United States Senate Committee on Cuban Relations was formed following the Spanish–American War, in 1899. The Committee was terminated, along with many others, in 1921.

== Chairmen of the Senate Committee on Cuban Relations, 1899–1921 ==
- Orville H. Platt (R-CT) 1899–1905
- Henry E. Burnham (R-NH) 1905–1909
- George Sutherland (R-UT) 1909–1911
- Carroll S. Page (R-VT) 1911–1913
- Joseph L. Bristow (R-KS) 1913–1915
- Oscar W. Underwood (D-AL) 1916–1919
- Hiram W. Johnson (R-CA) 1919–1921

== See also ==
- Cuba–United States relations
