= George Turner (American politician) =

American jurist, diplomat and U.S. senator

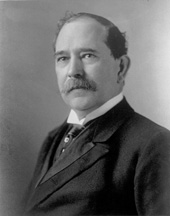

United States Senator from Washington
- In office March 4, 1897 – March 3, 1903
- Preceded by: Watson C. Squire
- Succeeded by: Levi Ankeny

Personal details
- Born: February 25, 1850 Edina, Missouri, U.S.
- Died: January 26, 1932 (aged 81) Spokane, Washington, U.S.
- Party: Democratic
- Other political affiliations: Silver Republican, Republican

George Turner (February 25, 1850 – January 26, 1932) was a jurist and diplomat who served one term as a United States senator from Washington.

Born in Edina, Missouri, he attended the common schools and served as a military telegraph operator with the Union Army from 1861 to 1865. He studied law, and was admitted to the bar in 1869, commencing practice in Mobile, Alabama. From 1876 to 1880, he was United States Marshal for the Southern District of Alabama and Middle District of Alabama, and served as Chairman of the Alabama Republican Party from 1882 to 1884. Shortly thereafter he re-located to the Territory of Washington in the Pacific Northwest where he was an associate justice of the Supreme Court of the Territory of Washington from 1885 to 1888.

While on the territorial supreme court, Turner was instrumental in revoking women's suffrage in Washington. In the case Harland v. Washington, he argued that women should not be able to vote because it enabled them to sit on juries, which they also should not be able to do.

He resumed the practice of law in Spokane, Washington in 1888 and was also interested in mining. He was a member of the Territorial Convention in 1889 that framed the first Washington Constitution, the state constitution of Washington, which had recently been admitted to the Union. He was an unsuccessful candidate for election as a Republican to the U.S. Senate in 1889 and 1893; he was elected on a fusion ticket with Silver Republicans, Democrats, and Populists support to the U.S. Senate and served from March 4, 1897, to March 3, 1903; he lost re-election and resumed the practice of law in Spokane.

In 1903, he was a member of the Alaska Boundary Tribunal and was an unsuccessful Democratic candidate for governor in 1904. He was counsel for the United States at The Hague in the northeastern fisheries arbitration with Great Britain in 1910, and was appointed by President William H. Taft as a member of the International Joint Commission, created to prevent disputes regarding the use of boundary waters between the United States and Canada from 1911 to 1914. He was counsel for the United States before the International Joint Commission from 1918 to 1924 and practiced law in Spokane. He died there in 1932 and is interred at Greenwood Cemetery.

Mount Turner on the Alaska-British Columbia border was named for him.

Party political offices
Preceded by John Rankin Rogers	Democratic nominee for Governor of Washington; 1904	Succeeded by John Pattison
First	Democratic nominee for United States Senator from Washington (Class 1); 1916	Succeeded by Clarence Dill
U.S. Senate
Preceded by Watson C. Squire	U.S. senator (Class 3) from Washington; 1897–1903; Served alongside: John L. Wilson, Addison G. Foster	Succeeded by Levi Ankeny
