= United States Senate Committee on Coast and Insular Survey =

The United States Senate Committee on Coast and Insular Survey was created in 1899 and terminated in 1921. As of 1915, the committee consisted of 9 senators.

== Chairmen ==
- Addison G. Foster (R-WA) 1899-1903
- Levi Ankeny (R-WA) 1903-1905
- Samuel Piles (R-WA) 1905-1911
- Charles E. Townsend (R-MI) 1911-1913
- Willard Saulsbury, Jr. (D-DE) 1913-1918
- Edward J. Gay (D-LA) 1918-1919
- Walter Edge (R-NJ) 1919-1921
