= Levi Ankeny =

American politician

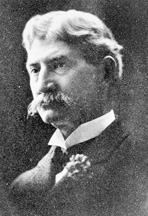

United States Senator from Washington
- In office March 4, 1903 – March 3, 1909
- Preceded by: George Turner
- Succeeded by: Wesley L. Jones

Personal details
- Born: August 1, 1844 Buchanan County, Missouri, U.S.
- Died: March 29, 1921 (aged 76) Walla Walla, Washington, U.S.
- Party: Republican
- Spouse: Mary Jane Nesmith

Levi Ankeny (August 1, 1844 – March 29, 1921) was a Republican United States Senator from the state of Washington.

He was born in Buchanan County, Missouri, near St. Joseph, but crossed the plains to Oregon in 1850 with his parents and settled in Portland. He attended the rural schools and later Kingsley Academy in Portland. Ankeny was the stepson and adopted son of Oregon steamboat captain and businessman Alexander P. Ankeny.

He worked in business in Lewiston, Idaho; Orofino, Idaho; and Florence, Idaho. He also became the mayor of Lewiston. He moved to Walla Walla, Washington, and engaged in banking. He was appointed a member of the Pan-American Exposition Commission and became its chairman.

In 1902 he was elected as a Republican to the United States Senate, and served from March 4, 1903, to March 3, 1909. He failed to be renominated in 1908. He was chairman of the Committee on Coast and Insular Survey (Fifty-eighth and Fifty-ninth Congresses).

In 1867 he married Mary Jane (Jennie) Nesmith, daughter of Oregon Senator James W. Nesmith: they had five children. Ankeny was member in Freemason order in Willamette Lodge No. 2, Portland, Oregon in 1866. He would later join Walla Walla Lodge No. 7 in 1878. He was also a member of Walla Walla Chapter No. 1, Royal Arch Masons, Washington Commandery No. 1, Knights Templar, Lawson Consistory, Ancient Accepted Scottish Rite and El Kalif Shrine in Spokane, Washington.

He worked in banking in Walla Walla until his death on March 29, 1921, and was interred at the Masonic Cemetery.

He is the namesake of the town of Ankeny, Washington.

He is also the namesake of Ankeny Field at Whitman College.

U.S. Senate
Preceded by George Turner	U.S. senator (Class 3) from Washington; 1903–1909; Served alongside: Addison G. Foster, Samuel H. Piles	Succeeded by Wesley L. Jones
