= Samuel H. Piles =

American politician

Samuel Henry Piles
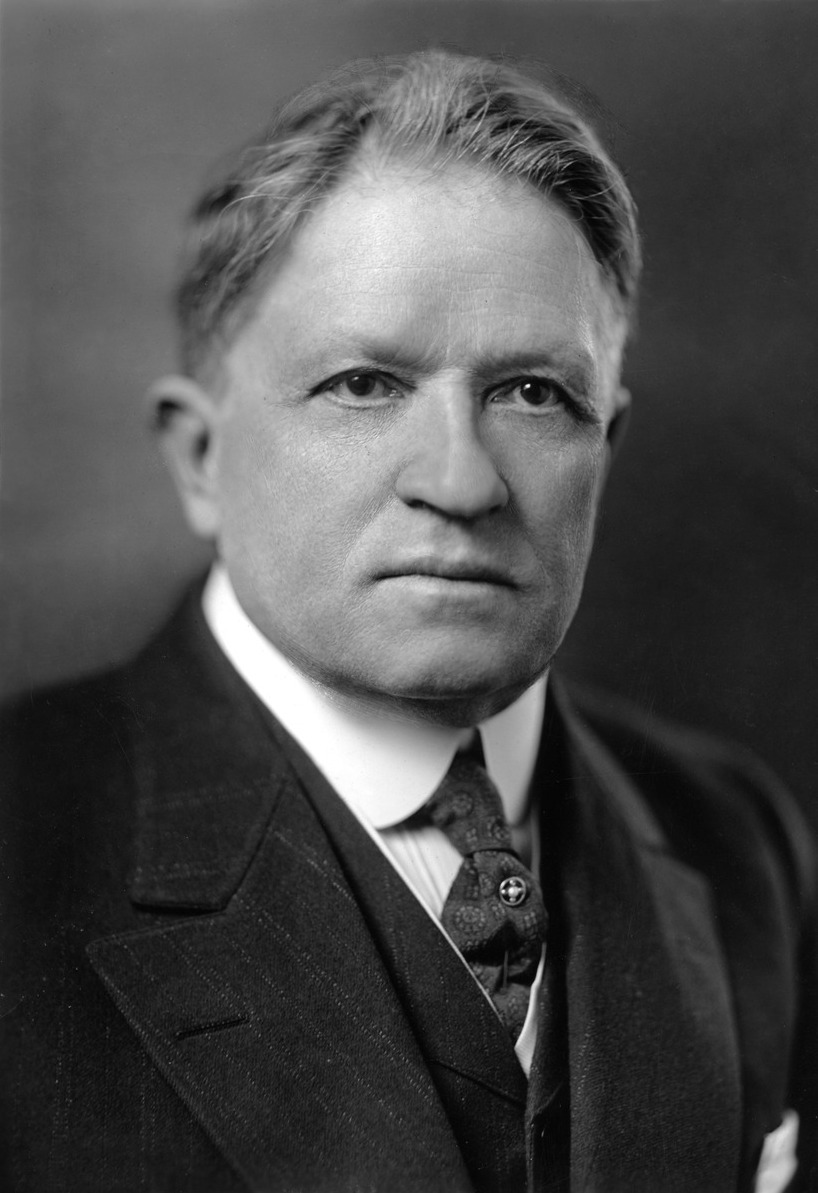

United States Senator from Washington
- In office March 4, 1905 – March 3, 1911
- Preceded by: Addison G. Foster
- Succeeded by: Miles Poindexter

United States Ambassador to Colombia
- In office 1922–1928
- Preceded by: Hoffman Philip
- Succeeded by: Jefferson Caffery

Personal details
- Born: December 28, 1858 Smithland, Kentucky, U.S.
- Died: March 11, 1940 (aged 81) Los Angeles, California, U.S.
- Resting place: Lake View Cemetery
- Party: Republican
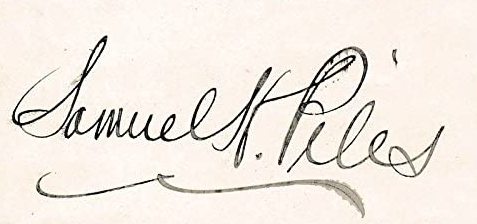
- Signature

Samuel Henry Piles (December 28, 1858 – March 11, 1940) was an American politician, attorney, and diplomat who served as a United States senator from Washington.

== Early life ==
Piles was born near Smithland, Kentucky, the son of Samuel Henry Piles (d. 1904) and Gabriella Lillard. The senior Piles was sheriff of Livingston County, and later practiced law. Samuel Jr. attended private schools in Kentucky before studying law.

== Career ==
Piles was admitted to the bar in 1883, and commenced practice in Snohomish, Territory of Washington.

He moved to Spokane in 1886 and later in the same year to Seattle, where he practiced law. He was assistant prosecuting attorney for the third judicial district of the Territory of Washington from 1887 to 1889 and city attorney of Seattle from 1888 to 1889. He was also general counsel of the Pacific Coast Company from 1895 to 1905.

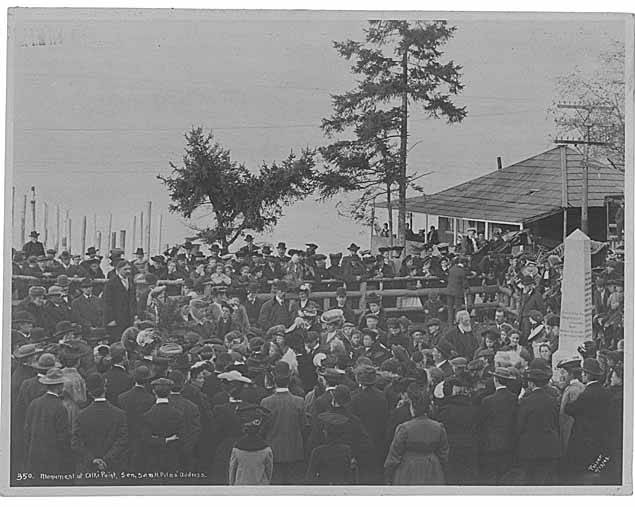
Piles addressing a crowd at the Alki Point Monument dedication November 13, 1905

In January 1905, Piles was elected to the U.S. Senate. He served one term, March 4, 1905, to March 3, 1911. He was not a candidate for renomination in 1910. While in the Senate, he was chairman of the Committee on Coast and Insular Survey (Fifty-ninth through Sixty-first Congresses). After leaving the Senate, he resumed the practice of law in Seattle.

In 1922, Piles was appointed by President Warren G. Harding as Minister to Colombia, an office he held until 1928.

== Personal life ==
In 1891, Piles married Mary E. Barnard of Henderson, Kentucky. They were the parents of three children: Ross Barnard, Ruth Lillard, and Samuel Henry.

He retired from active pursuits and moved to Los Angeles, California, where he died in 1940. He was interred in the Lake View Cemetery.

== Sources ==
=== Books ===
- The National Cyclopaedia of American Biography. Vol. XIV. New York, NY: James T. White & Company. 1910. p. 389.
- Eskew, Stephen (2011). Crittenden County, Kentucky Obituaries and Death Notices. Vol. II, 1900–1905. Marion, KY: Stephen Eskew. p. 183. ISBN 978-1-304-08219-0.
- Spencer, Thomas E. (1998). Where They're Buried. Baltimore, MD: Clearfield Company. p. 147. ISBN 9780806348230.

=== Newspapers ===
- "Goes to Senate: Native of Kentucky Honored in Washington; Samuel H. Piles, of Seattle, is Elected on the Thirteenth Joint Ballot". The Courier-Journal. Louisville, KY. January 28, 1905. p. 1.
- "Election in Washington: U.S. Senator will be Chosen to Succeed Samuel H. Piles". The Times Herald. Port Huron, MI. Associated Press. September 12, 1910. p. 6.
- "Who's Who in the Day's News: Samuel Henry Piles". The Palladium-Item. Richmond, IN. April 27, 1922. p. 4.
- "Ambassador Resigns; Another is Appointed". Akron Beacon-Journal. Akron, OH. Associated Press. June 27, 1928. p. 1.
- "Funeral Conducted for Ex-Senator Piles". Los Angeles Times. Los Angeles, CA. March 14, 1940. p. 41.

=== Magazines ===
- Connolly, C. P. (August 22, 1908). "Ankeney of Washington". Collier's: The national Weekly. New York, NY: P. F. Collier & Son. p. 16.

U.S. Senate
Preceded by Addison G. Foster	U.S. senator (Class 1) from Washington; March 4, 1905 – March 3, 1911; Served alongside: Levi Ankeny, Wesley L. Jones	Succeeded by Miles Poindexter
Diplomatic posts
Preceded by Hoffman Philip	United States Minister to Colombia; 29 May 1922 – 17 September 1928	Succeeded by Jefferson Caffery
