= United States Senate Select Committee on the Transportation and Sale of Meat Products =

The Select Committee on the Transportation and Sale of Meat Products, also known as the Vest Committee, after its first chairman Senator George G. Vest of Missouri, was a select committee of the United States Senate from 1887 – 1921. It was established to consider various aspects of the meat packing industry.

== History ==
The committee was formed in response to complaints by cattle producers and ranchers of abuse by major meat packers. It was the first investigation of the meat packing industry by U.S. Congress. One of the committee's first hearings was in St. Louis in November 1888 to investigate allegations that the "Big Four" meatpackers in Chicago were trying to "freeze out" competitors. In 1890, the committee issued a report that found no evidence of collusion by the major meat packers, but outlined various incidents of price fixing in the beef industry.

The committee's report stated, in part:

The principal cause of the depression in the prices paid to the cattle raiser and of the remarkable fact that the cost of beef to the consumer has not decreased in proportion, comes from the artificial and abnormal centralization of markets, and the absolute control by a few operators thereby made possible.

In place of the old system when shippers and butchers went from one cattle raiser to another, competing in the purchase of cattle, there is now a concentration of the market at a few points ... So far has this centralizing process continued that for all practical purposes the [Chicago] market ... dominates absolutely the price of beef cattle in the whole country.

== Chairmen ==
Name	Party	State	Years
George G. Vest	Democratic	Missouri	1887-1893
Orville H. Platt	Republican	Connecticut	1893-1895
William B. Bate	Democratic	Tennessee	1898-1899
Richard F. Pettigrew	Silver Republican	South Dakota	1900
Vacant			1901
John W. Daniel	Democratic	Virginia	1902-1907
Samuel D. McEnery	Democratic	Louisiana	1908-1910
Murphy J. Foster	Democratic	Louisiana	1911-1912
Henry A. du Pont	Republican	Delaware	1913-1915
Carroll S. Page	Republican	Vermont	1916-1921
John K. Shields	Democratic	Tennessee	1919-1921

== Sources ==
- Report of the Select Committee on the Transportation and Sale of Meat Products, Senate Report No. 829, 51st Congress, 1st Session. United States Senate. Government Printing Office. May 1890.
