= United States Senate Committee on Indian Depredations =

The Committee on Indian Depredations was a standing committee of the United States Senate from 1893 to 1921. It superseded a select committee which operated from 1889 to 1893.

== History ==
The Committee on Indian Depredations was created by a Senate resolution on March 15, 1893, and superseded a select committee on Indian depredations that had been established in 1889 to deal with the increased volume of Indian depredation claims. The committee oversaw claims under the Indian Depredation Act, which allows for citizen claims against the federal government for crimes committed by American Indians. Many committee petitioners requested that claims for crimes committed during wartime be eligible for compensation, because the act limited claims to depredations committed in times of peace with the Indians.

The committee was terminated April 18, 1921, when the Senate eliminated this and several other obsolete standing and select committees.

=== Predecessor committees ===
- Select Committee on Indian Depredations (1889 – 1893)

== Chairmen ==
- Gideon C. Moody (R-SD) 1889–1891
- George L. Shoup (R-ID) 1891–1893
- William Lindsay (D-KY) 1893-1895
- John L. Wilson (R-WA) 1895–1899
- William Deboe (R-KY) 1899–1901
- Robert J. Gamble (R-SD) 1901–1903
- J. Frank Allee (R-DE) 1903 – December 14, 1904 (appointed chairman of the Committee on Organization, Conduct, and Expenditures of the Executive Departments)
- Charles Dick (R-OH) December 14, 1904 – December 18, 1905
- Elmer J. Burkett (R-NE) December 18, 1905 – January 31, 1907 (appointed chairman of the Committee on Pacific Railroads)
- Charles Curtis (R-KS) 1907–1911
- Isidor Rayner (D-MD) 1911–1912
- Robert Latham Owen (D-OK) 1912–1913
- William Borah (R-ID) 1913–1917
- Miles Poindexter (R-WA) 1917–1919
- Henry L. Myers (D-MT) 1919–1921
