= C. W. Thompson =

Member of the U.S. House of Representatives from Alabama's 5th district

Charles Winston Thompson
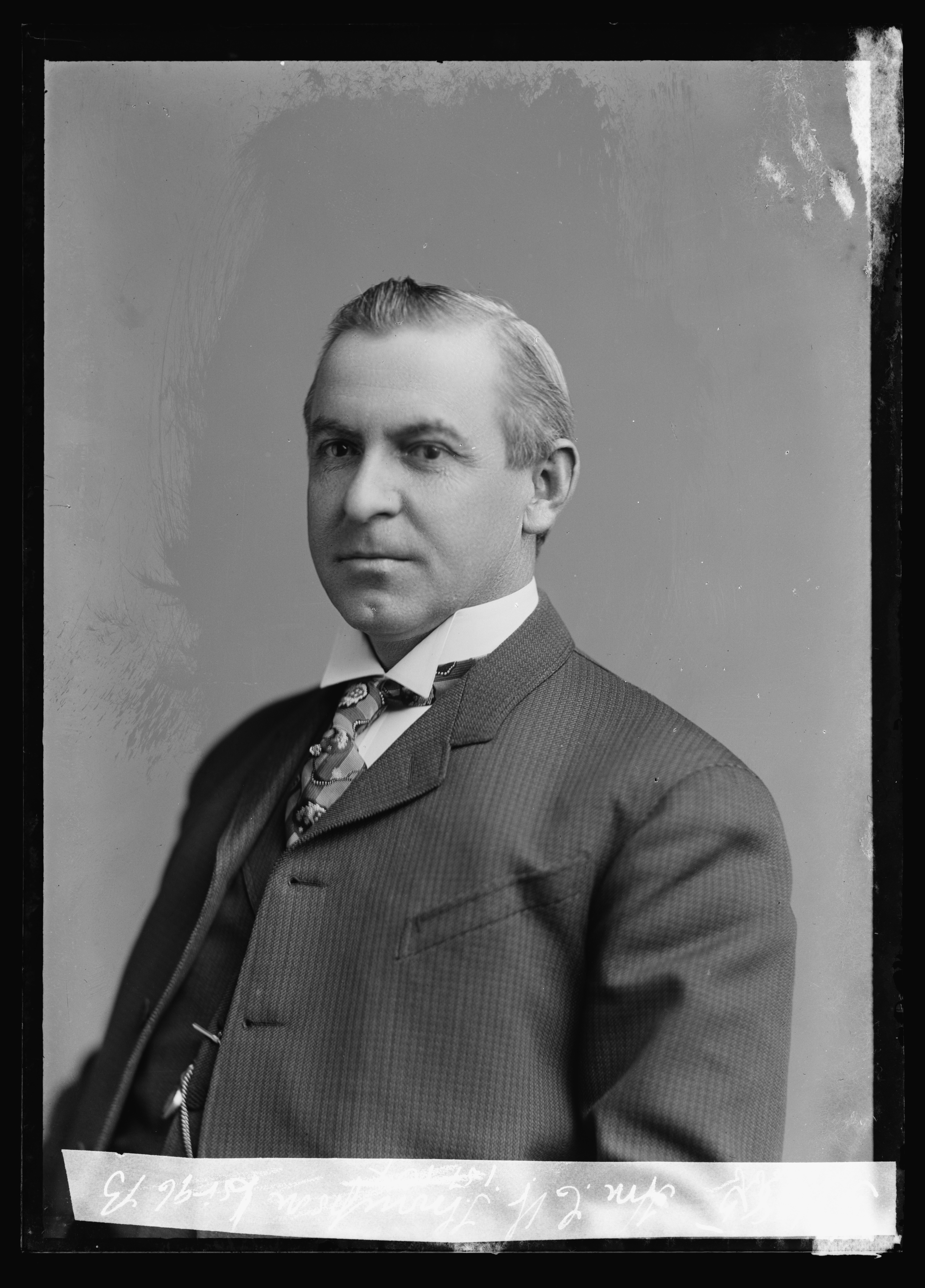

Member of the U.S. House of Representatives from Alabama's 5th district
- In office March 4, 1901 – March 20, 1904
- Preceded by: Willis Brewer
- Succeeded by: James Thomas Heflin

Member of the Alabama Senate
- In office 1898-1900

Personal details
- Born: December 30, 1860 Tuskegee, Alabama, U.S.
- Died: March 20, 1904 (aged 43) Washington, D.C., U.S.
- Party: Democratic
- Spouse: Estelle Alley

Charles Winston Thompson (December 30, 1860 – March 20, 1904) was an American banker and politician. He served as a member of the U.S. House of Representatives representing Alabama's 5th district from 1901 till his death. He was a Democrat.

== Biography ==
Thompson was born on December 30, 1860, near Tuskegee, Alabama, to William P. and Mary W. (Jordon) Thompson. His father was a Confederate soldier who went on to become mayor of Tuskegee and sheriff of Macon County. He was educated in public schools and graduated from Tuskegee's Park High School in 1878. From there Thompson attended Bryant & Stratton Business College. Thompson married Estelle Alley on April 20, 1880. The couple had two children, Ernest W. and Charles Winston Jr., before her death on March 19, 1894. From 1886 till 1890, Thompson served as Superintendent of education for Macon County.

Upon completion of his education, Thompson went to work at his father's mercantile business. He remained there until his father's death in 1891 when he sold the business. Thompson used the proceeds of the sale to open the Bank of Tuskegee, to which he was elected president. In 1894 Thompson helped create the Farmer's and Alliance Warehouse Company. Two years later, Governor Joseph F. Johnston appointed Thompson to his staff as a lieutenant colonel. He also became a Trustee to both Notasulga's Methodist District High School and the Girl's Industrial School of Alabama.

In 1898, Thompson ran unopposed for the Alabama Senate. There he represent the 26th district for two years during which time he helped secure a US$100,000 appropriation for the Girl's Industrial School, the largest such appropriation ever made by Alabama at the time.

Thompson was elected to represent Alabama's 5th congressional district in the U.S. House of Representatives in 1900. At the time he took his seat there was no free delivery of mail to rural addresses within his district. To address this situation he secured ten new rural mail routes for his state. While serving his first term, Thompson met a number of representatives from northern states and learned his personal prejudices against them where unfounded. To help build better understanding between northern and southern representatives, and to better inform his colleagues on race issues in the south, Thompson organized a tour of the south at his personal expense. Participants in the tour included Treasury Secretary L. M. Shaw and U.S. Representatives Samuel S. Barney, Archibald B. Darragh, Charles W. Gillet, Charles E. Littlefield, Samuel W. McCall, Thaddeus Maclay Mahon, Ernest W. Roberts, and Charles Addison Russell.

Thompson took ill and died from pneumonia during the afternoon of March 20, 1904, in Washington, D.C.

== See also ==
- List of members of the United States Congress who died in office (1900–1949)

U.S. House of Representatives
Preceded by Willis Brewer	Member of the U.S. House of Representatives from Alabama's 5th congressional district 1901–1904	Succeeded by J. Thomas Heflin
