= Addison G. Foster =

American politician (1837–1917)

Addison Gardner Foster
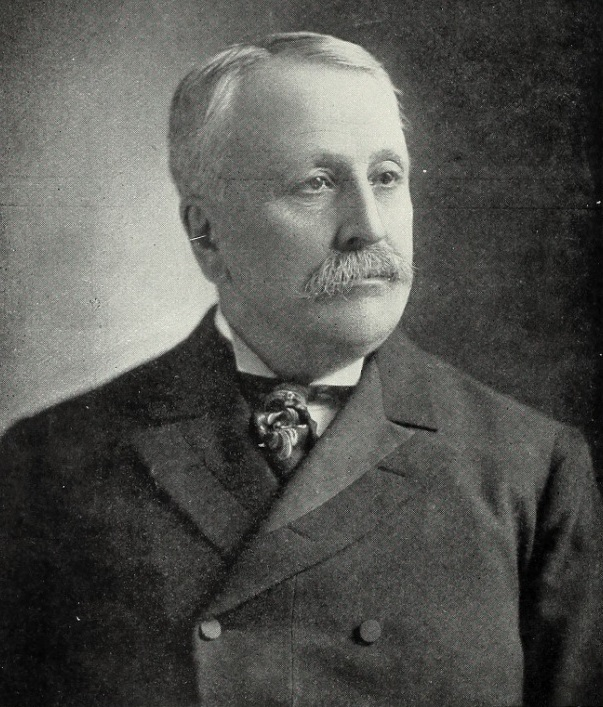
- From 1900s Men and Issues of 1900

United States Senator from Washington
- In office March 4, 1899 – March 3, 1905
- Preceded by: John L. Wilson
- Succeeded by: Samuel H. Piles

Auditor of Wabasha County, Minnesota
- In office November 1861 – January 1871
- Preceded by: E. W. Foster
- Succeeded by: W. W. Case

Personal details
- Born: January 28, 1837 Belchertown, Massachusetts, U.S.
- Died: January 16, 1917 (aged 79) Tacoma, Washington, U.S.
- Resting place: Oakland Cemetery; Saint Paul, Minnesota.
- Party: Republican
- Spouse: Martha Ann Wetherby (m. 1863-1917, his death)
- Children: 4
- Occupation: Businessman

Addison Gardner Foster (January 28, 1837 – January 16, 1917) was an American businessman and politician who was prominent in Minnesota and Washington. A Republican, he was most notable for his service as a United States senator from Washington for one term, 1899 to 1905.

== Early life ==
Addison G. Foster was born in Belchertown, Massachusetts on January 28, 1837, the son of Samuel Foster and Mary Worthington Walker. Foster was raised and educated in Belchertown until he was thirteen, when his parents relocated, first to Oswego, Illinois, and then to Sheboygan Falls, Wisconsin. Foster was educated in the schools of Belchertown and Oswego, and worked on the family's farms. In Wisconsin, he also worked on his parents' timberlands, where he gained his first experience with logging. He completed his education in Sheboygan Falls, and obtained his qualification to teach school.

After reaching adulthood, Foster and a brother began a westward journey, intending to settle in Colorado. Foster turned back and made the return trip as far as Missouri, where he remained after accepting a teaching position. After this experience, he returned briefly to Wisconsin before deciding to pursue business opportunities in Minnesota.

== Career ==
In the early 1860s, Foster settled in Wabasha, Minnesota, where he engaged in logging. A Republican, Foster served as auditor of Wabasha County from 1861 to 1871 and also served as a term as county surveyor. In addition to logging, Foster became active in other ventures, including publishing the Winona Express newspaper. He was also a major shareholder in the Wabasha Mill Company, which was formed to manufacture flour. In addition, Foster operated a freight forwarding and commission merchant business in Lake City and Red Wing.

In the mid-1870s, Foster moved to Saint Paul, Minnesota, where he was a neighbor of Cushman Kellogg Davis. Foster became a friend and political supporter, and took part in Davis's successful campaign for governor in 1874 and subsequent campaigns for the United States Senate. In 1874, he successfully managed the U.S. Senate campaign of Samuel J. R. McMillan. In 1882, Foster managed the gubernatorial campaign of Lucius Frederick Hubbard. In 1888, Foster managed the successful U.S. House campaigns of Samuel Snider and Darwin Hall.

In 1877, Foster entered into a business partnership with Chauncey Wright Griggs, which they maintained until Griggs died in 1910. Their ventures included the Beaver Dam Lumber Company, Lehigh Coal & Iron Company, and the Saint Paul & Tacoma Lumber Company. Foster's other business interests included the Wilkeson Coal & Coke Company, as well as real estate development in Tacoma, Washington and elsewhere. In 1888, Foster moved to Tacoma to take more active management of his business interests in Washington. These ventures continued to expand, and included cargo ships and meatpacking. In 1895 and 1896, Foster supported Cushman K. Davis for president. Davis did not become an active candidate, and the Republican nomination was won by William McKinley, who went on to win the general election.

== U.S. Senator ==
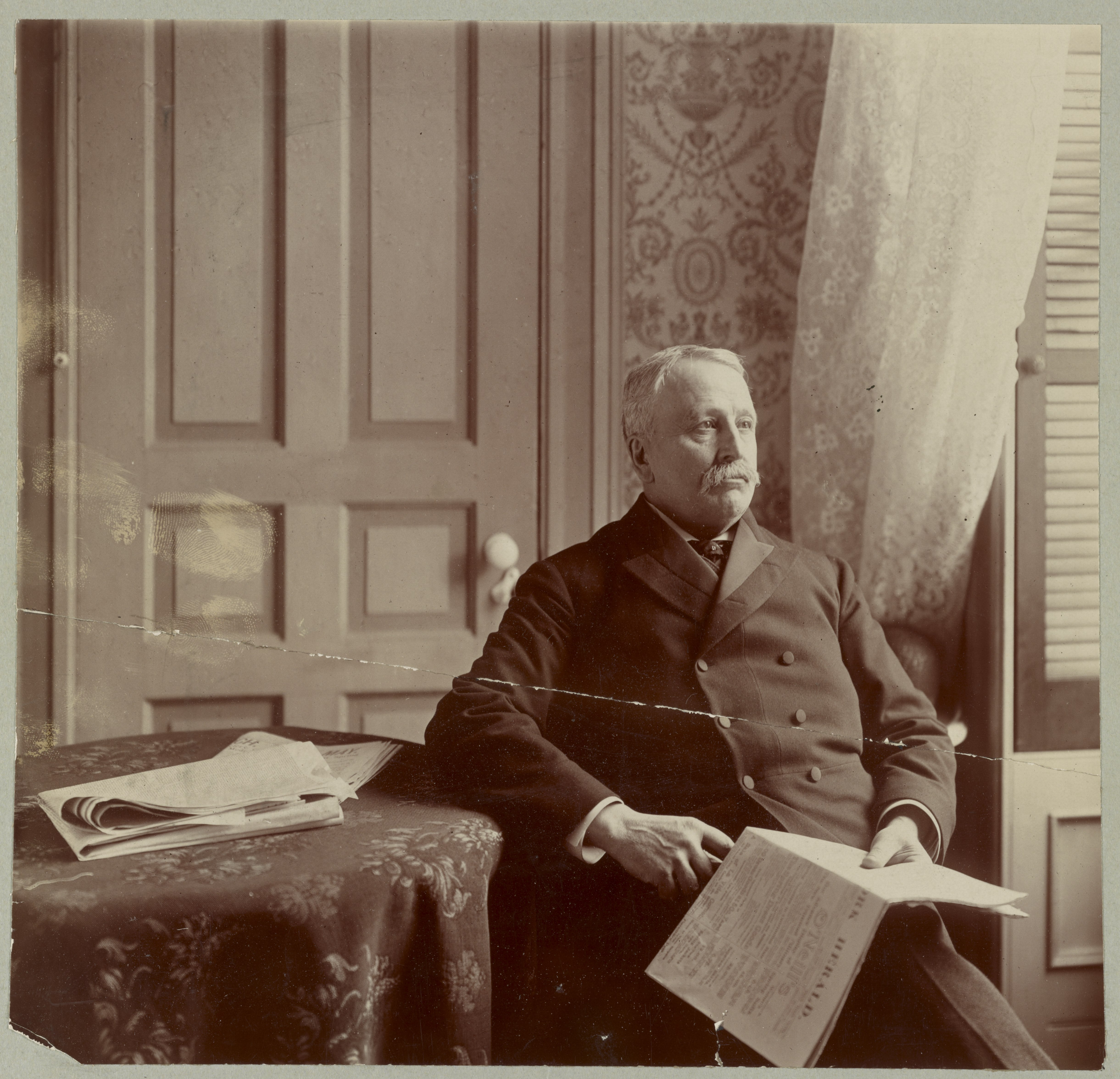
1899 George Grantham Bain photo of Foster after his election to the U.S. Senate

In 1898, pro-business Republicans in Washington decided to support Foster in the state legislative election for the United States Senate seat held by John L. Wilson as their best hope of preventing the election of a free silver candidate; in 1896, a fusion movement of Democrats, Populists and free silver Republicans had succeeded in electing Democrat George Turner to the U.S. Senate.

In the 1899 election, the Republican frontrunners were Wilson, Foster, Thomas J. Humes, and Levi Ankeny. On the 24th ballot, Republican members of the Washington State Legislature decided to support Foster in order to prevent the election of a free silver candidate, and Foster was elected. He served one term, March 4, 1899, to March 3, 1905. During his Senate career, Foster was chairman of the Committee on Coast and Insular Survey from 1899 to 1903. In addition, he was a member of the committees on Agriculture, Fisheries, Woman Suffrage, and Revolutionary War Claims.

Foster was a candidate for reelection in 1905; opponents included Charles Sweeny and Samuel H. Piles. After a week of balloting by the state legislature failed to produce a winner, Sweeny agreed to support Piles, and Piles was elected.

== Later life ==
After leaving the Senate, Foster resumed management of his business interests until he retired in 1914. Foster died in Tacoma on January 16, 1917. He was buried at Oakland Cemetery in Saint Paul, Minnesota.

== Family ==
In 1863, Foster married Martha Ann Wetherby of Pennsylvania, who he met while she was visiting Wabasha. They were the parents of four children—Harrison Gardner, Francis Walker, Martha Rowena, and Charles Addison.

U.S. Senate
Preceded by John L. Wilson	U.S. senator (Class 1) from Washington; 1899–1905; Served alongside: George Turner, Levi Ankeny	Succeeded by Samuel H. Piles
