= Henry E. Burnham =

American politician

Henry Eben Burnham
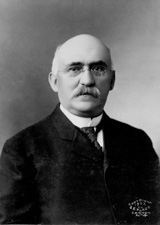

United States Senator from New Hampshire
- In office March 4, 1901 – March 3, 1913
- Preceded by: William E. Chandler
- Succeeded by: Henry F. Hollis

Member of the New Hampshire House of Representatives
- In office 1873–1874

Personal details
- Born: November 8, 1844 Dunbarton, New Hampshire
- Died: February 8, 1917 (aged 72) Manchester, New Hampshire
- Party: Republican
- Education: Dartmouth College

Henry Eben Burnham (November 8, 1844 – February 8, 1917) was a United States senator from New Hampshire.

== Early life and education ==
Henry E. Burnham was born in Dunbarton, New Hampshire on November 8, 1844. After attending the local public high school, Burnham also attended the Kimball Union Academy. He later studied law at Dartmouth College, where he graduated in 1865. He then was admitted to the bar in 1868.

== Career ==
After passing the bar, Burnham opened a legal practice in Manchester. He subsequently engaged in the banking and insurance industries and served as a member of the New Hampshire House of Representatives in 1873-1874.

From 1875 to 1877, Burnham served as treasurer of Hillsborough County. In 1876, he concurrently served as judge of probate for Hillsborough County, a position he held until 1879.

Burnham was named chairman of the Republican State convention in 1888, and served as a member of the State constitutional convention the next year.

In 1892, Burnham assumed the role of ballot-law commissioner. He served in the position until 1900 and was elected to the U.S. Senate in 1901. Seven years later, Burnham was reelected to the Senate. He subsequently served until March 1913, when he was ineligible for re-election.

While Burnahm held a seat in the United Staes Senate, he served as chairman of the Committee on Cuban Relations and was a member of the Committee on Claims and the Committee on Agriculture and Forestry.

== Personal life ==
Burnham married married Hannah Elizabeth Patterson on October 22, 1874. The couple had three daughters.

Patterson passed away on February 8, 1917 in Manchester and was buried in Pine Grove Cemetery.

U.S. Senate
Preceded by William E. Chandler	U.S. senator (Class 2) from New Hampshire; 1901–1913; Served alongside: Jacob H. Gallinger	Succeeded by Henry F. Hollis
