= List of United States representatives in the 58th Congress =

This is a complete list of United States representatives during the 58th United States Congress listed by seniority.

As an historical article, the districts and party affiliations listed reflect those during the 58th Congress (March 4, 1903 – March 3, 1905). Seats and party affiliations on similar lists for other congresses will be different for certain members.

Seniority depends on the date on which members were sworn into office. Since many members are sworn in on the same day, subsequent ranking is based on previous congressional service of the individual and then by alphabetical order by the last name of the representative.

Committee chairmanship in the House is often associated with seniority. However, party leadership is typically not associated with seniority.

Note: The "*" indicates that the representative/delegate may have served one or more non-consecutive terms while in the House of Representatives of the United States Congress.

== U.S. House seniority list ==
U.S. House seniority
Rank	Representative	Party	District	Seniority date (Previous service, if any)	No.# of term(s)	Notes
1	Henry H. Bingham	R	PA-01	March 4, 1879	13th term	Dean of the House
2	Robert R. Hitt	R	IL-13	December 4, 1882	12th term	
3	James D. Richardson	D	TN-05	March 4, 1885	10th term	Left the House in 1905.
4	John H. Bankhead	D	AL-06	March 4, 1887	9th term	
5	John Dalzell	R	PA-30	March 4, 1887	9th term	
6	Samuel Matthews Robertson	D	LA-06	December 5, 1887	9th term	
7	Rufus E. Lester	D	GA-01	March 4, 1889	8th term	
8	George W. Smith	R	IL-25	March 4, 1889	8th term	
9	Sereno E. Payne	R	NY-31	December 2, 1889; Previous service, 1883–1887.	10th term*	
10	David A. De Armond	D	MO-06	March 4, 1891	7th term	
11	John A. T. Hull	R	IA-07	March 4, 1891	7th term	
12	William Atkinson Jones	D	VA-01	March 4, 1891	7th term	
13	Leonidas F. Livingston	D	GA-05	March 4, 1891	7th term	
14	Adolph Meyer	D	LA-01	March 4, 1891	7th term	
15	James Wolcott Wadsworth	R	NY-34	March 4, 1891; Previous service, 1881–1885.	9th term*	
16	Joseph W. Babcock	R	WI-03	March 4, 1893	6th term	
17	Richard Bartholdt	R	MO-10	March 4, 1893	6th term	
18	Joseph Gurney Cannon	R	IL-18	March 4, 1893; Previous service, 1873–1891.	15th term*	Speaker of the House
19	Henry Allen Cooper	R	WI-01	March 4, 1893	6th term	
20	Samuel B. Cooper	D	TX-02	March 4, 1893	6th term	Left the House in 1905.
21	Robert G. Cousins	R	IA-05	March 4, 1893	6th term	
22	Charles Curtis	R	KS-01	March 4, 1893	6th term	
23	Hugh A. Dinsmore	D	AR-03	March 4, 1893	6th term	Left the House in 1905.
24	John J. Gardner	R	NJ-02	March 4, 1893	6th term	
25	Charles W. Gillet	R	NY-33	March 4, 1893	6th term	Left the House in 1905.
26	Frederick H. Gillett	R	MA-02	March 4, 1893	6th term	
27	Charles H. Grosvenor	R	OH-11	March 4, 1893; Previous service, 1885–1891.	9th term*	
28	William Peters Hepburn	R	IA-08	March 4, 1893; Previous service, 1881–1887.	9th term*	
29	John F. Lacey	R	IA-06	March 4, 1893; Previous service, 1889–1891.	7th term*	
30	Henry C. Loudenslager	R	NJ-01	March 4, 1893	6th term	
31	John W. Maddox	D	GA-07	March 4, 1893	6th term	Left the House in 1905.
32	Thaddeus Maclay Mahon	R	PA-17	March 4, 1893	6th term	
33	Samuel W. McCall	R	MA-08	March 4, 1893	6th term	
34	James McCleary	R	MN-02	March 4, 1893	6th term	
35	James S. Sherman	R	NY-27	March 4, 1893; Previous service, 1887–1891.	8th term*	
36	Claude A. Swanson	D	VA-05	March 4, 1893	6th term	
37	Farish Carter Tate	D	GA-09	March 4, 1893	6th term	Left the House in 1905.
38	James Albertus Tawney	R	MN-01	March 4, 1893	6th term	
39	H. Clay Van Voorhis	R	OH-15	March 4, 1893	6th term	Left the House in 1905.
40	Irving Price Wanger	R	PA-08	March 4, 1893	6th term	
41	John Sharp Williams	D	MS-08	March 4, 1893	6th term	
42	Robert Adams, Jr.	R	PA-02	December 19, 1893	6th term	
43	John Sebastian Little	D	AR-04	December 3, 1894	6th term	
44	Ernest F. Acheson	R	PA-24	March 4, 1895	5th term	
45	Charles Lafayette Bartlett	D	GA-06	March 4, 1895	5th term	
46	Roswell P. Bishop	R	MI-09	March 4, 1895	5th term	
47	Theodore E. Burton	R	OH-21	March 4, 1895; Previous service, 1889–1891.	6th term*	
48	Alston G. Dayton	R	WV-02	March 4, 1895	5th term	Left the House in 1905.
49	Blackburn B. Dovener	R	WV-01	March 4, 1895	5th term	
50	George Edmund Foss	R	IL-10	March 4, 1895	5th term	
51	Charles N. Fowler	R	NJ-05	March 4, 1895	5th term	
52	Henry R. Gibson	R	TN-02	March 4, 1895	5th term	Left the House in 1905.
53	Joseph V. Graff	R	IL-16	March 4, 1895	5th term	
54	James A. Hemenway	R	IN-01	March 4, 1895	5th term	Left the House in 1905.
55	E. Stevens Henry	R	CT-01	March 4, 1895	5th term	
56	Ebenezer J. Hill	R	CT-04	March 4, 1895	5th term	
57	Benjamin Franklin Howell	R	NJ-03	March 4, 1895	5th term	
58	John J. Jenkins	R	WI-11	March 4, 1895	5th term	
59	George B. McClellan, Jr.	D	NY-12	March 4, 1895	5th term	Resigned on December 21, 1903.
60	Edward S. Minor	R	WI-09	March 4, 1895	5th term	
61	Theobald Otjen	R	WI-04	March 4, 1895	5th term	
62	Jesse Overstreet	R	IN-07	March 4, 1895	5th term	
63	Richard W. Parker	R	NJ-07	March 4, 1895	5th term	
64	John F. Shafroth	D	CO-01	March 4, 1895	5th term	Resigned on February 15, 1904.
65	William Alden Smith	R	MI-05	March 4, 1895	5th term	
66	James H. Southard	R	OH-09	March 4, 1895	5th term	
67	Stephen M. Sparkman	D	FL-01	March 4, 1895	5th term	
68	Nehemiah D. Sperry	R	CT-02	March 4, 1895	5th term	
69	Cyrus A. Sulloway	R	NH-01	March 4, 1895	5th term	
70	William Sulzer	D	NY-10	March 4, 1895	5th term	
71	Vespasian Warner	R	IL-19	March 4, 1895	5th term	Left the House in 1905.
72	George W. Prince	R	IL-15	December 2, 1895	5th term	
73	William C. Adamson	D	GA-04	March 4, 1897	4th term	
74	De Alva S. Alexander	R	NY-36	March 4, 1897	4th term	
75	Thomas Henry Ball	D	TX-08	March 4, 1897	4th term	Resigned on November 16, 1903.
76	Maecenas Eason Benton	D	MO-15	March 4, 1897	4th term	Left the House in 1905.
77	William Gordon Brantley	D	GA-11	March 4, 1897	4th term	
78	Walter Brownlow	R	TN-01	March 4, 1897	4th term	
79	Robert F. Broussard	D	LA-03	March 4, 1897	4th term	
80	Stephen Brundidge, Jr.	D	AR-02	March 4, 1897	4th term	
81	Thomas S. Butler	R	PA-07	March 4, 1897	4th term	
82	Adin B. Capron	R	RI-02	March 4, 1897	4th term	
83	Champ Clark	D	MO-09	March 4, 1897; Previous service, 1893–1895.	5th term*	
84	Henry De Lamar Clayton, Jr.	D	AL-03	March 4, 1897	4th term	
85	Charles F. Cochran	D	MO-04	March 4, 1897	4th term	Left the House in 1905.
86	William S. Cowherd	D	MO-05	March 4, 1897	4th term	Left the House in 1905.
87	Edgar D. Crumpacker	R	IN-10	March 4, 1897	4th term	
88	Robert C. Davey	D	LA-02	March 4, 1897; Previous service, 1893–1895.	5th term*	
89	James H. Davidson	R	WI-08	March 4, 1897	4th term	
90	Robert Wyche Davis	D	FL-02	March 4, 1897	4th term	Left the House in 1905.
91	John W. Gaines	D	TN-06	March 4, 1897	4th term	
92	James M. Griggs	D	GA-02	March 4, 1897	4th term	
93	Edward L. Hamilton	R	MI-04	March 4, 1897	4th term	
94	James Hay	D	VA-07	March 4, 1897	4th term	
95	Robert Lee Henry	D	TX-11	March 4, 1897	4th term	
96	William Marcellus Howard	D	GA-08	March 4, 1897	4th term	
97	John H. Ketcham	R	NY-21	March 4, 1897; Previous service, 1865–1873 and 1877–1893.	16th term**	
98	William Walton Kitchin	D	NC-05	March 4, 1897	4th term	
99	John Lamb	D	VA-03	March 4, 1897	4th term	
100	Charles B. Landis	R	IN-09	March 4, 1897	4th term	
101	Elijah B. Lewis	D	GA-03	March 4, 1897	4th term	
102	Lucius Littauer	R	NY-25	March 4, 1897	4th term	
103	William C. Lovering	R	MA-14	March 4, 1897	4th term	
104	James R. Mann	R	IL-02	March 4, 1897	4th term	
105	Robert W. Miers	D	IN-02	March 4, 1897	4th term	Left the House in 1905.
106	John A. Moon	D	TN-03	March 4, 1897	4th term	
107	Sydney Emanuel Mudd I	R	MD-05	March 4, 1897; Previous service, 1890–1891.	5th term*	
108	Marlin Edgar Olmsted	R	PA-18	March 4, 1897	4th term	
109	Rice Alexander Pierce	D	TN-09	March 4, 1897; Previous service, 1883–1885 and 1889–1893.	7th term**	Left the House in 1905.
110	John Franklin Rixey	D	VA-08	March 4, 1897	4th term	
111	Edward Robb	D	MO-13	March 4, 1897	4th term	Left the House in 1905.
112	James M. Robinson	D	IN-12	March 4, 1897	4th term	Left the House in 1905.
113	Thetus W. Sims	D	TN-08	March 4, 1897	4th term	
114	James Luther Slayden	D	TX-14	March 4, 1897	4th term	
115	David Highbaugh Smith	D	KY-04	March 4, 1897	4th term	
116	Samuel William Smith	R	MI-06	March 4, 1897	4th term	
117	John Hall Stephens	D	TX-13	March 4, 1897	4th term	
118	Frederick Stevens	R	MN-04	March 4, 1897	4th term	
119	George W. Taylor	D	AL-01	March 4, 1897	4th term	
120	Oscar Underwood	D	AL-09	March 4, 1897; Previous service, 1895–1896.	5th term*	
121	Willard Duncan Vandiver	D	MO-14	March 4, 1897	4th term	Left the House in 1905.
122	William T. Zenor	D	IN-03	March 4, 1897	4th term	
123	James Tilghman Lloyd	D	MO-01	June 1, 1897	4th term	
124	Edwin C. Burleigh	R	ME-03	June 21, 1897	4th term	
125	George P. Lawrence	R	MA-01	November 2, 1897	4th term	
126	Henry Sherman Boutell	R	IL-09	November 23, 1897	4th term	
127	Francis M. Griffith	D	IN-04	December 6, 1897	4th term	Left the House in 1905.
128	William S. Greene	R	MA-13	May 31, 1898	4th term	
129	Thomas Spight	D	MS-02	July 5, 1898	4th term	
130	Charles W. F. Dick	R	OH-19	November 8, 1898	4th term	Resigned on March 23, 1904.
131	Frank A. McLain	D	MS-07	December 12, 1898	4th term	
132	Vincent Boreing	R	KY-11	March 4, 1899	3rd term	Died on September 16, 1903.
133	Justin De Witt Bowersock	R	KS-02	March 4, 1899	3rd term	
134	Phanor Breazeale	D	LA-04	March 4, 1899	3rd term	Left the House in 1905.
135	Abraham L. Brick	R	IN-13	March 4, 1899	3rd term	
136	Charles H. Burke	R	SD	March 4, 1899	3rd term	
137	Elmer Burkett	R	NE-01	March 4, 1899	3rd term	Left the House in 1905.
138	Albert S. Burleson	D	TX-10	March 4, 1899	3rd term	
139	John L. Burnett	D	AL-07	March 4, 1899	3rd term	
140	William A. Calderhead	R	KS-05	March 4, 1899; Previous service, 1895–1897.	4th term*	
141	Ben F. Caldwell	D	IL-21	March 4, 1899	3rd term	Left the House in 1905.
142	George W. Cromer	R	IN-08	March 4, 1899	3rd term	
143	Joseph B. Crowley	D	IL-23	March 4, 1899	3rd term	Left the House in 1905.
144	Francis W. Cushman	R	WA	March 4, 1899	3rd term	
145	John Dougherty	D	MO-03	March 4, 1899	3rd term	Left the House in 1905.
146	Michael E. Driscoll	R	NY-29	March 4, 1899	3rd term	
147	John J. Esch	R	WI-07	March 4, 1899	3rd term	
148	David E. Finley	D	SC-05	March 4, 1899	3rd term	
149	John J. Fitzgerald	D	NY-07	March 4, 1899	3rd term	
150	Joseph W. Fordney	R	MI-08	March 4, 1899	3rd term	
151	George Peter Foster	D	IL-04	March 4, 1899	3rd term	Left the House in 1905.
152	Washington Gardner	R	MI-03	March 4, 1899	3rd term	
153	George G. Gilbert	D	KY-08	March 4, 1899	3rd term	
154	Gilbert N. Haugen	R	IA-04	March 4, 1899	3rd term	
155	Thomas Hedge	R	IA-01	March 4, 1899	3rd term	
156	Wesley Livsey Jones	R	WA	March 4, 1899	3rd term	
157	Theodore F. Kluttz	D	NC-08	March 4, 1899	3rd term	Left the House in 1905.
158	Victor H. Metcalf	R	CA-03	March 4, 1899	3rd term	Resigned on July 1, 1904.
159	James Monroe Miller	R	KS-04	March 4, 1899	3rd term	
160	Franklin Wheeler Mondell	R	WY	March 4, 1899; Previous service, 1895–1897.	4th term*	
161	Stephen Morgan	R	OH-10	March 4, 1899	3rd term	Left the House in 1905.
162	James C. Needham	R	CA-06	March 4, 1899	3rd term	
163	George Alexander Pearre	R	MD-06	March 4, 1899	3rd term	
164	William Augustus Reeder	R	KS-06	March 4, 1899	3rd term	
165	Ernest W. Roberts	R	MA-07	March 4, 1899	3rd term	
166	William W. Rucker	D	MO-02	March 4, 1899	3rd term	
167	Jacob Ruppert	D	NY-16	March 4, 1899	3rd term	
168	William H. Ryan	D	NY-35	March 4, 1899	3rd term	
169	Joseph C. Sibley	R	PA-28	March 4, 1899; Previous service, 1893–1895.	4th term*	
170	John Humphrey Small	D	NC-01	March 4, 1899	3rd term	
171	John R. Thayer	D	MA-03	March 4, 1899	3rd term	Left the House in 1905.
172	Charles R. Thomas	D	NC-03	March 4, 1899	3rd term	
173	Lot Thomas	R	IA-11	March 4, 1899	3rd term	Left the House in 1905.
174	Frank Charles Wachter	R	MD-03	March 4, 1899	3rd term	
175	James Eli Watson	R	IN-06	March 4, 1899; Previous service, 1895–1897.	4th term*	
176	James R. Williams	D	IL-24	March 4, 1899; Previous service, 1889–1895.	6th term*	Left the House in 1905.
177	Frank E. Wilson	D	NY-04	March 4, 1899	3rd term	Left the House in 1905.
178	Charles Frederick Wright	R	PA-14	March 4, 1899	3rd term	Left the House in 1905.
179	Charles E. Littlefield	R	ME-02	June 19, 1899	3rd term	
180	Joseph E. Ransdell	D	LA-05	August 29, 1899	3rd term	
181	Dorsey W. Shackleford	D	MO-08	August 29, 1899	3rd term	
182	Amos L. Allen	R	ME-01	November 6, 1899	3rd term	
183	Edward B. Vreeland	R	NY-37	November 7, 1899	3rd term	
184	Joseph J. Gill	R	OH-16	December 4, 1899	3rd term	Resigned on October 31, 1903.
185	William N. Richardson	D	AL-08	August 6, 1900	3rd term	
186	Edward de Veaux Morrell	R	PA-05	November 6, 1900	3rd term	
187	Allan Langdon McDermott	D	NJ-10	December 3, 1900	3rd term	
188	Walter I. Smith	R	IA-09	December 3, 1900	3rd term	
189	James Perry Conner	R	IA-10	December 4, 1900	3rd term	
190	Arthur Laban Bates	R	PA-25	March 4, 1901	2nd term	
191	Jacob A. Beidler	R	OH-20	March 4, 1901	2nd term	
192	Webster E. Brown	R	WI-10	March 4, 1901	2nd term	
193	Sydney J. Bowie	D	AL-04	March 4, 1901	2nd term	
194	George Farmer Burgess	D	TX-09	March 4, 1901	2nd term	
195	Henry Burk	R	PA-03	March 4, 1901	2nd term	Died on December 5, 1903.
196	Ezekiel S. Candler, Jr.	D	MS-01	March 4, 1901	2nd term	
197	John W. Cassingham	D	OH-17	March 4, 1901	2nd term	Left the House in 1905.
198	Frank Dunklee Currier	R	NH-02	March 4, 1901	2nd term	
199	Archibald B. Darragh	R	MI-11	March 4, 1901	2nd term	
200	Elias Deemer	R	PA-15	March 4, 1901	2nd term	
201	William H. Douglas	R	NY-15	March 4, 1901	2nd term	Left the House in 1905.
202	William Henry Draper	R	NY-22	March 4, 1901	2nd term	
203	Alvin Evans	R	PA-19	March 4, 1901	2nd term	Left the House in 1905.
204	Henry D. Flood	D	VA-10	March 4, 1901	2nd term	
205	Robert H. Foerderer	R	PA-04	March 4, 1901	2nd term	Died on July 26, 1903.
206	David J. Foster	R	VT-01	March 4, 1901	2nd term	
207	Joseph H. Gaines	R	WV-03	March 4, 1901	2nd term	
208	Henry M. Goldfogle	D	NY-09	March 4, 1901	2nd term	
209	Daniel Linn Gooch	D	KY-06	March 4, 1901	2nd term	Left the House in 1905.
210	Kittredge Haskins	R	VT-02	March 4, 1901	2nd term	
211	Charles Q. Hildebrant	R	OH-06	March 4, 1901	2nd term	Left the House in 1905.
212	Elias S. Holliday	R	IN-05	March 4, 1901	2nd term	
213	James A. Hughes	R	WV-05	March 4, 1901	2nd term	
214	William Humphreys Jackson	R	MD-01	March 4, 1901	2nd term	Left the House in 1905.
215	Joseph T. Johnson	D	SC-04	March 4, 1901	2nd term	
216	James Nicholas Kehoe	D	KY-09	March 4, 1901	2nd term	Left the House in 1905.
217	Claude Kitchin	D	NC-02	March 4, 1901	2nd term	
218	Thomas B. Kyle	R	OH-07	March 4, 1901	2nd term	Left the House in 1905.
219	George H. Lindsay	D	NY-02	March 4, 1901	2nd term	
220	William Frank Mahoney	D	IL-08	March 4, 1901	2nd term	Died on December 27, 1904.
221	Thomas Frank Marshall	R	ND	March 4, 1901	2nd term	
222	Eben Martin	R	SD	March 4, 1901	2nd term	
223	Harry L. Maynard	D	VA-02	March 4, 1901	2nd term	
224	James McAndrews	D	IL-05	March 4, 1901	2nd term	Left the House in 1905.
225	James McLachlan	R	CA-07	March 4, 1901; Previous service, 1895–1897.	3rd term*	
226	Robert M. Nevin	R	OH-03	March 4, 1901	2nd term	
227	Lemuel P. Padgett	D	TN-07	March 4, 1901	2nd term	
228	Henry Wilbur Palmer	R	PA-11	March 4, 1901	2nd term	
229	George Robert Patterson	R	PA-12	March 4, 1901	2nd term	
230	Malcolm R. Patterson	D	TN-10	March 4, 1901	2nd term	
231	James Breck Perkins	R	NY-32	March 4, 1901	2nd term	
232	Edward W. Pou	D	NC-04	March 4, 1901	2nd term	
233	Samuel L. Powers	R	MA-12	March 4, 1901	2nd term	Left the House in 1905.
234	Choice B. Randell	D	TX-04	March 4, 1901	2nd term	
235	Charles C. Reid	D	AR-05	March 4, 1901	2nd term	
236	Robert B. Scarborough	D	SC-06	March 4, 1901	2nd term	Left the House in 1905.
237	Charles Frederick Scott	R	KS	March 4, 1901	2nd term	
238	William W. Skiles	R	OH-14	March 4, 1901	2nd term	Died on January 9, 1904.
239	John S. Snook	D	OH-05	March 4, 1901	2nd term	Left the House in 1905.
240	George N. Southwick	R	NY-23	March 4, 1901; Previous service, 1895–1899.	4th term*	
241	Charles Winston Thompson	D	AL-05	March 4, 1901	2nd term	Died on March 20, 1904.
242	Charles Q. Tirrell	R	MA-04	March 4, 1901	2nd term	
243	South Trimble	D	KY-07	March 4, 1901	2nd term	
244	William R. Warnock	R	OH-08	March 4, 1901	2nd term	Left the House in 1905.
245	Ariosto A. Wiley	D	AL-02	March 4, 1901	2nd term	
246	Llewellyn Powers	R	ME-04	April 8, 1901; Previous service, 1877–1879.	3rd term*	
247	Henry B. Cassel	R	PA-09	November 5, 1901	2nd term	
248	Charles L. Knapp	R	NY-28	November 5, 1901	2nd term	
249	Asbury Francis Lever	D	SC-07	November 5, 1901	2nd term	
250	Frank B. Brandegee	R	CT-03	November 4, 1902	2nd term	
251	John Wilbur Dwight	R	NY-30	November 4, 1902	2nd term	
252	Augustus Peabody Gardner	R	MA-06	November 4, 1902	2nd term	
253	Carter Glass	D	VA-06	November 4, 1902	2nd term	
254	Gordon J. Russell	D	TX-03	November 4, 1902	2nd term	
255	Morris Sheppard	D	TX-01	November 15, 1902	2nd term	
256	Henry Cullen Adams	R	WI-02	March 4, 1903	1st term	
257	Wyatt Aiken	D	SC-03	March 4, 1903	1st term	
258	Butler Ames	R	MA-05	March 4, 1903	1st term	
259	Robert Baker	D	NY-06	March 4, 1903	1st term	Left the House in 1905.
260	Edward Bassett	D	NY-05	March 4, 1903	1st term	Left the House in 1905.
261	James Bede	R	MN-08	March 4, 1903	1st term	
262	Theodore Arlington Bell	D	CA-02	March 4, 1903	1st term	Left the House in 1905.
263	De Witt C. Badger	D	OH-12	March 4, 1903	1st term	Left the House in 1905.
264	James Andrew Beall	D	TX-05	March 4, 1903	1st term	
265	Allan Benny	D	NJ-09	March 4, 1903	1st term	Left the House in 1905.
266	Benjamin P. Birdsall	R	IA-03	March 4, 1903	1st term	
267	Eaton J. Bowers	D	MS-06	March 4, 1903	1st term	
268	Thomas W. Bradley	R	NY-20	March 4, 1903	1st term	
269	Franklin E. Brooks	R	CO	March 4, 1903	1st term	
270	James W. Brown	R	PA-32	March 4, 1903	1st term	Left the House in 1905.
271	Clarence Buckman	R	MN-06	March 4, 1903	1st term	
272	James Joseph Butler	D	MO-12	March 4, 1903; Previous service, 1901–1902 and 1902–1903.	3rd term**	Left the House in 1905.
273	Adam M. Byrd	D	MS-05	March 4, 1903	1st term	
274	Philip P. Campbell	R	KS-03	March 4, 1903	1st term	
275	Allen Foster Cooper	R	PA-23	March 4, 1903	1st term	
276	George W. Croft	D	SC-02	March 4, 1903	1st term	Died on March 10, 1904.
277	Milton J. Daniels	R	CA-08	March 4, 1903	1st term	Left the House in 1905.
278	Charles Russell Davis	R	MN-03	March 4, 1903	1st term	
279	James William Denny	D	MD-04	March 4, 1903; Previous service, 1899–1901.	2nd term*	Left the House in 1905.
280	Charles Heber Dickerman	D	PA-16	March 4, 1903	1st term	Left the House in 1905.
281	Joseph M. Dixon	R	MT	March 4, 1903	1st term	
282	Solomon Robert Dresser	R	PA-21	March 4, 1903	1st term	
283	Charles T. Dunwell	R	NY-03	March 4, 1903	1st term	
284	Martin Emerich	D	IL-01	March 4, 1903	1st term	Left the House in 1905.
285	Scott Field	D	TX-06	March 4, 1903	1st term	
286	Morgan Cassius Fitzpatrick	D	TN-04	March 4, 1903	1st term	Left the House in 1905.
287	William H. Flack	R	NY-26	March 4, 1903	1st term	
288	Burton L. French	R	ID	March 4, 1903	1st term	
289	Charles Eugene Fuller	R	IL-12	March 4, 1903	1st term	
290	Harvey C. Garber	D	OH-04	March 4, 1903	1st term	
291	John Nance Garner	D	TX-15	March 4, 1903	1st term	
292	Oscar W. Gillespie	D	TX-12	March 4, 1903	1st term	
293	James Gillett	R	CA-01	March 4, 1903	1st term	
294	Herman P. Goebel	R	OH-02	March 4, 1903	1st term	
295	Joseph A. Goulden	D	NY-18	March 4, 1903	1st term	
296	Daniel L. D. Granger	D	RI-01	March 4, 1903	1st term	
297	Alexander W. Gregg	D	TX-07	March 4, 1903	1st term	
298	James M. Gudger, Jr.	D	NC-10	March 4, 1903	1st term	
299	Courtney W. Hamlin	D	MO-07	March 4, 1903	1st term	Left the House in 1905.
300	Thomas W. Hardwick	D	GA-10	March 4, 1903	1st term	
301	Francis Burton Harrison	D	NY-13	March 4, 1903	1st term	Left the House in 1905.
302	William Randolph Hearst	D	NY-11	March 4, 1903	1st term	
303	Wilson S. Hill	D	MS-04	March 4, 1903	1st term	
304	Edmund H. Hinshaw	R	NE-04	March 4, 1903	1st term	
305	Gilbert Hitchcock	D	NE-02	March 4, 1903	1st term	Left the House in 1905.
306	Herschel M. Hogg	R	CO-02	March 4, 1903	1st term	
307	Francis A. Hopkins	D	KY-10	March 4, 1903	1st term	
308	George Howell	D	PA-10	March 4, 1903	1st term	Resigned on February 10, 1904.
309	Henry A. Houston	D	DE	March 4, 1903	1st term	Left the House in 1905.
310	Joseph Howell	R	UT	March 4, 1903	1st term	
311	George Franklin Huff	R	PA-22	March 4, 1903; Previous service, 1891–1893 and 1895–1897.	3rd term**	
312	William Hughes	D	NJ-06	March 4, 1903	1st term	Left the House in 1905.
313	Benjamin G. Humphreys II	D	MS-03	March 4, 1903	1st term	
314	William E. Humphrey	R	WA	March 4, 1903	1st term	
315	John T. Hunt	D	MO-11	March 4, 1903	1st term	
316	Amos H. Jackson	R	OH-13	March 4, 1903	1st term	Left the House in 1905.
317	Ollie Murray James	D	KY-01	March 4, 1903	1st term	
318	John A. Keliher	D	MA-09	March 4, 1903	1st term	
319	James Kennedy	R	OH-18	March 4, 1903	1st term	
320	Moses Kinkaid	R	NE-06	March 4, 1903	1st term	
321	Marcus C. L. Kline	D	PA-13	March 4, 1903	1st term	
322	Philip Knopf	R	IL-07	March 4, 1903	1st term	
323	Daniel F. Lafean	R	PA-20	March 4, 1903	1st term	
324	William Bailey Lamar	D	FL-03	March 4, 1903	1st term	
325	J. Robert Lamar	D	MO-16	March 4, 1903	1st term	Left the House in 1905.
326	Frederick Landis	R	IN-11	March 4, 1903	1st term	
327	William M. Lanning	R	NJ-04	March 4, 1903	1st term	Resigned on June 6, 1904.
328	George Swinton Legaré	D	SC-01	March 4, 1903	1st term	
329	George L. Lilley	R	CT	March 4, 1903	1st term	
330	John Lind	D	MN-05	March 4, 1903; Previous service, 1887–1893.	4th term*	Left the House in 1905.
331	Edward J. Livernash	D	CA-04	March 4, 1903	1st term	Left the House in 1905.
332	Nicholas Longworth	R	OH-01	March 4, 1903	1st term	
333	William Lorimer	R	IL-06	March 4, 1903; Previous service, 1895–1901.	4th term*	
334	George A. Loud	R	MI-10	March 4, 1903	1st term	
335	Alfred Lucking	D	MI-01	March 4, 1903	1st term	Left the House in 1905.
336	Robert B. Macon	D	AR-01	March 4, 1903	1st term	
337	Benjamin F. Marsh	R	IL-14	March 4, 1903; Previous service, 1877–1883 and 1893–1901.	8th term**	
338	John McCarthy	R	NE-03	March 4, 1903	1st term	
339	George Deardorff McCreary	R	PA-06	March 4, 1903	1st term	
340	Henry McMorran	R	MI-07	March 4, 1903	1st term	
341	William S. McNary	D	MA-10	March 4, 1903	1st term	
342	George W. Norris	R	NE-05	March 4, 1903	1st term	
343	Norton P. Otis	R	NY-19	March 4, 1903	1st term	Died on February 20, 1905.
344	Robert N. Page	D	NC-07	March 4, 1903	1st term	
345	Gilbert B. Patterson	D	NC-06	March 4, 1903	1st term	
346	Henry Kirke Porter	R	PA-31	March 4, 1903	1st term	Left the House in 1905.
347	Arsène Pujo	D	LA-07	March 4, 1903	1st term	
348	Henry Thomas Rainey	D	IL-20	March 4, 1903	1st term	
349	John Stockdale Rhea	D	KY-03	March 4, 1903; Previous service, 1897–1902.	4th term*	Left the House in 1905.
350	Ira E. Rider	D	NY-14	March 4, 1903	1st term	Left the House in 1905.
351	Joseph Taylor Robinson	D	AR-06	March 4, 1903	1st term	
352	William A. Rodenberg	R	IL-22	March 4, 1903; Previous service, 1899–1901.	2nd term*	
353	Townsend Scudder	D	NY-01	March 4, 1903; Previous service, 1899–1901.	2nd term*	Left the House in 1905.
354	J. Swagar Sherley	D	KY-05	March 4, 1903	1st term	
355	George Shiras	R	PA-29	March 4, 1903	1st term	Left the House in 1905.
356	Francis Emanuel Shober	D	NY-17	March 4, 1903	1st term	Left the House in 1905.
357	Joseph Horace Shull	D	PA-26	March 4, 1903	1st term	Left the House in 1905.
358	Campbell Slemp	R	VA-09	March 4, 1903	1st term	
359	George J. Smith	R	NY-24	March 4, 1903	1st term	Left the House in 1905.
360	William Orlando Smith	R	PA-27	March 4, 1903	1st term	
361	William Robert Smith	D	TX-16	March 4, 1903	1st term	
362	Howard M. Snapp	R	IL-11	March 4, 1903	1st term	
363	Robert G. Southall	D	VA-04	March 4, 1903	1st term	
364	Burleigh F. Spalding	R	ND	March 4, 1903; Previous service, 1899–1901.	2nd term*	Left the House in 1905.
365	William H. Stafford	R	WI-05	March 4, 1903	1st term	
366	Augustus Owsley Stanley	D	KY-02	March 4, 1903	1st term	
367	Halvor Steenerson	R	MN-09	March 4, 1903	1st term	
368	John Allen Sterling	R	IL-17	March 4, 1903	1st term	
369	John Andrew Sullivan	D	MA-11	March 4, 1903	1st term	
370	Timothy Sullivan	D	NY-08	March 4, 1903	1st term	
371	Joshua Frederick Cockey Talbott	D	MD-02	March 4, 1903; Previous service, 1879–1885 and 1893–1895.	5th term**	
372	Charles E. Townsend	R	MI-02	March 4, 1903	1st term	
373	Clarence D. Van Duzer	D	NV	March 4, 1903	1st term	
374	Andrew Volstead	R	MN-07	March 4, 1903	1st term	
375	Martin Joseph Wade	D	IA-02	March 4, 1903	1st term	Left the House in 1905.
376	Robert M. Wallace	D	AR-07	March 4, 1903	1st term	
377	Edwin Y. Webb	D	NC-09	March 4, 1903	1st term	
378	Charles H. Weisse	D	WI-06	March 4, 1903	1st term	
379	William H. Wiley	R	NJ-08	March 4, 1903	1st term	
380	John N. Williamson	R	OR-01	March 4, 1903	1st term	
381	William Warfield Wilson	R	IL-03	March 4, 1903	1st term	
382	Harry C. Woodyard	R	WV-04	March 4, 1903	1st term	
383	William J. Wynn	D	CA-05	March 4, 1903	1st term	Left the House in 1905.
384	H. Olin Young	R	MI-12	March 4, 1903	1st term	
	Victor Murdock	R	KS-07	May 26, 1903	1st term	
	Binger Hermann	R	OR-02	June 1, 1903; Previous service, 1885–1897.	7th term*	
	Reuben Moon	R	PA-04	November 3, 1903	1st term	
	Capell L. Weems	R	OH-16	November 3, 1903	1st term	
	W. Godfrey Hunter	R	KY-11	November 10, 1903; Previous service, 1887–1889 and 1895–1897.	3rd term**	Left the House in 1905.
	John M. Pinckney	D	TX-08	November 17, 1903	1st term	
	William Connell	R	PA-10	February 10, 1904; Previous service, 1897–1903.	4th term*	Left the House in 1905.
	Robert W. Bonynge	R	CO-01	February 16, 1904	1st term	
	George A. Castor	R	PA-03	February 16, 1904	1st term	
	William Bourke Cockran	D	NY-12	February 23, 1904; Previous service, 1887–1889 and 1891–1895.	4th term**	
	Theodore G. Croft	D	SC-02	May 17, 1904	1st term	Left the House in 1905.
	James Thomas Heflin	D	AL-05	May 19, 1904	1st term	
	Joseph R. Knowland	R	CA-03	November 8, 1904	1st term	
	W. Aubrey Thomas	R	OH-19	November 8, 1904	1st term	
	Amos R. Webber	R	OH-14	November 8, 1904	1st term	
	Ira W. Wood	R	NJ-04	November 8, 1904	1st term	

== Delegates ==
Rank	Delegate	Party	District	Seniority date (Previous service, if any)	No.# of term(s)	Notes
1	Federico Degetau	R	PR	March 4, 1901	2nd term	
2	Bernard Shandon Rodey	R	NM	March 4, 1901	2nd term	
3	Jonah Kūhiō Kalanianaʻole	R	HI	March 4, 1903	1st term	
4	Bird Segle McGuire	R	OK	March 4, 1903	1st term	
5	John Frank Wilson	D	AZ	March 4, 1903; Previous service, 1899–1901.	2nd term*	

== See also ==
- 58th United States Congress
- List of United States congressional districts
- List of United States senators in the 58th Congress
