= List of United States representatives in the 57th Congress =

This is a complete list of United States representatives during the 57th United States Congress listed by seniority.

As an historical article, the districts and party affiliations listed reflect those during the 57th Congress (March 4, 1901 – March 3, 1903). Seats and party affiliations on similar lists for other congresses will be different for certain members.

Seniority depends on the date on which members were sworn into office. Since many members are sworn in on the same day, subsequent ranking is based on previous congressional service of the individual and then by alphabetical order by the last name of the representative.

Committee chairmanship in the House is often associated with seniority. However, party leadership is typically not associated with seniority.

Note: The "*" indicates that the representative/delegate may have served one or more non-consecutive terms while in the House of Representatives of the United States Congress.

== U.S. House seniority list ==
U.S. House seniority
| Rank | Representative | Party | District | Seniority date (Previous service, if any) | No.# of term(s) | Notes |
|---|---|---|---|---|---|---|
| 1 | Henry H. Bingham | R | PA-01 | March 4, 1879 | 12th term | Dean of the House |
| 2 | Robert R. Hitt | R | IL-09 | December 4, 1882 | 11th term | |
| 3 | David B. Henderson | R | IA-03 | March 4, 1883 | 10th term | Speaker of the House; Left the House in 1903. |
| 4 | James D. Richardson | D | TN-05 | March 4, 1885 | 9th term | |
| 5 | Albert J. Hopkins | R | IL-08 | December 7, 1885 | 9th term | Left the House in 1903. |
| 6 | Thomas Chipman McRae | D | AR-03 | December 7, 1885 | 9th term | Left the House in 1903. |
| 7 | John H. Bankhead | D | AL-06 | March 4, 1887 | 8th term | |
| 8 | John Dalzell | R | PA-22 | March 4, 1887 | 8th term | |
| 9 | Charles Addison Russell | R | CT-03 | March 4, 1887 | 8th term | Died on October 23, 1902. |
| 10 | Samuel Matthews Robertson | D | LA-06 | December 5, 1887 | 8th term | |
| 11 | Marriott Henry Brosius | R | PA-10 | March 4, 1889 | 7th term | Died on March 16, 1901. |
| 12 | Rufus E. Lester | D | GA-01 | March 4, 1889 | 7th term | |
| 13 | George W. Smith | R | IL-22 | March 4, 1889 | 7th term | |
| 14 | Sereno E. Payne | R | NY-28 | December 2, 1889; Previous service, 1883–1887. | 9th term* | |
| 15 | David A. De Armond | D | MO-06 | March 4, 1891 | 6th term | |
| 16 | John A. T. Hull | R | IA-07 | March 4, 1891 | 6th term | |
| 17 | William Atkinson Jones | D | VA-01 | March 4, 1891 | 6th term | |
| 18 | Leonidas F. Livingston | D | GA-05 | March 4, 1891 | 6th term | |
| 19 | Eugene F. Loud | R | CA-05 | March 4, 1891 | 6th term | Left the House in 1903. |
| 20 | Adolph Meyer | D | LA-01 | March 4, 1891 | 6th term | |
| 21 | George W. Ray | R | NY-26 | March 4, 1891; Previous service, 1883–1885. | 7th term* | Resigned on September 11, 1902. |
| 22 | James Wolcott Wadsworth | R | NY-30 | March 4, 1891; Previous service, 1881–1885. | 8th term* | |
| 23 | Joseph W. Babcock | R | WI-03 | March 4, 1893 | 5th term | |
| 24 | Richard Bartholdt | R | MO-10 | March 4, 1893 | 5th term | |
| 25 | John Calhoun Bell | P | CO-02 | March 4, 1893 | 5th term | Left the House in 1903. |
| 26 | Joseph Gurney Cannon | R | IL-12 | March 4, 1893; Previous service, 1873–1891. | 14th term* | |
| 27 | Henry Allen Cooper | R | WI-01 | March 4, 1893 | 5th term | |
| 28 | Samuel B. Cooper | D | TX-02 | March 4, 1893 | 5th term | |
| 29 | Robert G. Cousins | R | IA-05 | March 4, 1893 | 5th term | |
| 30 | Charles Curtis | R | KS-01 | March 4, 1893 | 5th term | |
| 31 | Hugh A. Dinsmore | D | AR-05 | March 4, 1893 | 5th term | |
| 32 | Loren Fletcher | R | MN-05 | March 4, 1893 | 5th term | Left the House in 1903. |
| 33 | John J. Gardner | R | NJ-02 | March 4, 1893 | 5th term | |
| 34 | Charles W. Gillet | R | NY-29 | March 4, 1893 | 5th term | |
| 35 | Frederick H. Gillett | R | MA-02 | March 4, 1893 | 5th term | |
| 36 | Charles H. Grosvenor | R | OH-11 | March 4, 1893; Previous service, 1885–1891. | 8th term* | |
| 37 | William Peters Hepburn | R | IA-08 | March 4, 1893; Previous service, 1881–1887. | 8th term* | |
| 38 | John F. Lacey | R | IA-06 | March 4, 1893; Previous service, 1889–1891. | 6th term* | |
| 39 | Asbury Latimer | D | SC-03 | March 4, 1893 | 5th term | Left the House in 1903. |
| 40 | Henry C. Loudenslager | R | NJ-01 | March 4, 1893 | 5th term | |
| 41 | John W. Maddox | D | GA-07 | March 4, 1893 | 5th term | |
| 42 | Thaddeus Maclay Mahon | R | PA-18 | March 4, 1893 | 5th term | |
| 43 | Samuel W. McCall | R | MA-08 | March 4, 1893 | 5th term | |
| 44 | James McCleary | R | MN-02 | March 4, 1893 | 5th term | |
| 45 | Philip D. McCulloch, Jr. | D | AR-01 | March 4, 1893 | 5th term | Left the House in 1903. |
| 46 | David Henry Mercer | R | NE-02 | March 4, 1893 | 5th term | Left the House in 1903. |
| 47 | Francis G. Newlands | D | NV | March 4, 1893 | 5th term | Left the House in 1903. |
| 48 | James S. Sherman | R | NY-25 | March 4, 1893; Previous service, 1887–1891. | 7th term* | |
| 49 | Claude A. Swanson | D | VA-05 | March 4, 1893 | 5th term | |
| 50 | W. Jasper Talbert | D | SC-02 | March 4, 1893 | 5th term | Left the House in 1903. |
| 51 | Farish Carter Tate | D | GA-09 | March 4, 1893 | 5th term | |
| 52 | James Albertus Tawney | R | MN-01 | March 4, 1893 | 5th term | |
| 53 | H. Clay Van Voorhis | R | OH-15 | March 4, 1893 | 5th term | |
| 54 | Irving Price Wanger | R | PA-07 | March 4, 1893 | 5th term | |
| 55 | John Sharp Williams | D | MS-05 | March 4, 1893 | 5th term | |
| 56 | Robert Adams, Jr. | R | PA-02 | December 19, 1893 | 5th term | |
| 57 | Galusha A. Grow | R | PA | February 26, 1894; Previous service, 1851–1863. | 11th term* | Left the House in 1903. |
| 58 | Jacob H. Bromwell | R | OH-02 | December 3, 1894 | 5th term | Left the House in 1903. |
| 59 | John Sebastian Little | D | AR-02 | December 3, 1894 | 5th term | |
| 60 | Ernest F. Acheson | R | PA-24 | March 4, 1895 | 4th term | |
| 61 | Samuel S. Barney | R | WI-05 | March 4, 1895 | 4th term | Left the House in 1903. |
| 62 | Charles Lafayette Bartlett | D | GA-06 | March 4, 1895 | 4th term | |
| 63 | Roswell P. Bishop | R | MI-09 | March 4, 1895 | 4th term | |
| 64 | Melville Bull | R | RI-01 | March 4, 1895 | 4th term | Left the House in 1903. |
| 65 | Theodore E. Burton | R | OH-21 | March 4, 1895; Previous service, 1889–1891. | 5th term* | |
| 66 | John Blaisdell Corliss | R | MI-01 | March 4, 1895 | 4th term | Left the House in 1903. |
| 67 | Rousseau Owen Crump | R | MI-10 | March 4, 1895 | 4th term | Died on May 1, 1901. |
| 68 | Alston G. Dayton | R | WV-02 | March 4, 1895 | 4th term | |
| 69 | Blackburn B. Dovener | R | WV-01 | March 4, 1895 | 4th term | |
| 70 | Frank Eddy | R | MN-07 | March 4, 1895 | 4th term | Left the House in 1903. |
| 71 | George Edmund Foss | R | IL-07 | March 4, 1895 | 4th term | |
| 72 | Charles N. Fowler | R | NJ-08 | March 4, 1895 | 4th term | |
| 73 | Henry R. Gibson | R | TN-02 | March 4, 1895 | 4th term | |
| 74 | Joseph V. Graff | R | IL-14 | March 4, 1895 | 4th term | |
| 75 | Joel P. Heatwole | R | MN-03 | March 4, 1895 | 4th term | Left the House in 1903. |
| 76 | James A. Hemenway | R | IN-01 | March 4, 1895 | 4th term | |
| 77 | E. Stevens Henry | R | CT-01 | March 4, 1895 | 4th term | |
| 78 | Ebenezer J. Hill | R | CT-04 | March 4, 1895 | 4th term | |
| 79 | Benjamin Franklin Howell | R | NJ-03 | March 4, 1895 | 4th term | |
| 80 | John J. Jenkins | R | WI-10 | March 4, 1895 | 4th term | |
| 81 | Charles Frederick Joy | R | MO-11 | March 4, 1895; Previous service, 1893–1894. | 5th term* | Left the House in 1903. |
| 82 | William Shadrach Knox | R | MA-05 | March 4, 1895 | 4th term | Left the House in 1903. |
| 83 | George B. McClellan, Jr. | D | NY-12 | March 4, 1895 | 4th term | |
| 84 | Edward S. Minor | R | WI-08 | March 4, 1895 | 4th term | |
| 85 | Peter J. Otey | D | VA-06 | March 4, 1895 | 4th term | Died on May 4, 1902. |
| 86 | Theobald Otjen | R | WI-04 | March 4, 1895 | 4th term | |
| 87 | Jesse Overstreet | R | IN-07 | March 4, 1895 | 4th term | |
| 88 | Richard W. Parker | R | NJ-06 | March 4, 1895 | 4th term | |
| 89 | Walter Reeves | R | IL-11 | March 4, 1895 | 4th term | Left the House in 1903. |
| 90 | John F. Shafroth | R | CO-01 | March 4, 1895 | 4th term | |
| 91 | William Alden Smith | R | MI-05 | March 4, 1895 | 4th term | |
| 92 | James H. Southard | R | OH-09 | March 4, 1895 | 4th term | |
| 93 | Stephen M. Sparkman | D | FL-01 | March 4, 1895 | 4th term | |
| 94 | Nehemiah D. Sperry | R | CT-02 | March 4, 1895 | 4th term | |
| 95 | George Washington Steele | R | IN-11 | March 4, 1895; Previous service, 1881–1889. | 8th term* | Left the House in 1903. |
| 96 | James F. Stewart | R | NJ-05 | March 4, 1895 | 4th term | Left the House in 1903. |
| 97 | Cyrus A. Sulloway | R | NH-01 | March 4, 1895 | 4th term | |
| 98 | William Sulzer | D | NY-11 | March 4, 1895 | 4th term | |
| 99 | Robert Walker Tayler | R | OH-18 | March 4, 1895 | 4th term | Left the House in 1903. |
| 100 | Vespasian Warner | R | IL-13 | March 4, 1895 | 4th term | |
| 101 | Amos J. Cummings | D | NY-10 | November 5, 1895; Previous service, 1887–1889 and 1889–1894. | 8th term** | Died on May 2, 1902. |
| 102 | William Henry Moody | R | MA-06 | November 5, 1895 | 4th term | Resigned on May 1, 1902. |
| 103 | George W. Prince | R | IL-10 | December 2, 1895 | 4th term | |
| 104 | Rudolph Kleberg | D | TX-11 | April 7, 1896 | 4th term | Left the House in 1903. |
| 105 | J. William Stokes | D | SC-07 | November 3, 1896; Previous service, 1895–1896. | 5th term* | Died on July 6, 1901. |
| 106 | William C. Adamson | D | GA-04 | March 4, 1897 | 3rd term | |
| 107 | De Alva S. Alexander | R | NY-33 | March 4, 1897 | 3rd term | |
| 108 | Thomas Henry Ball | D | TX-01 | March 4, 1897 | 3rd term | |
| 109 | Maecenas Eason Benton | D | MO-15 | March 4, 1897 | 3rd term | |
| 110 | William Gordon Brantley | D | GA-11 | March 4, 1897 | 3rd term | |
| 111 | Robert F. Broussard | D | LA-03 | March 4, 1897 | 3rd term | |
| 112 | Walter Brownlow | R | TN-01 | March 4, 1897 | 3rd term | |
| 113 | Stephen Brundidge, Jr. | D | AR-06 | March 4, 1897 | 3rd term | |
| 114 | Robert E. Burke | D | TX-06 | March 4, 1897 | 3rd term | Died on June 5, 1901. |
| 115 | Thomas S. Butler | R | PA-06 | March 4, 1897 | 3rd term | |
| 116 | Adin B. Capron | R | RI-02 | March 4, 1897 | 3rd term | |
| 117 | Champ Clark | D | MO-09 | March 4, 1897; Previous service, 1893–1895. | 4th term* | |
| 118 | Henry De Lamar Clayton, Jr. | D | AL-03 | March 4, 1897 | 3rd term | |
| 119 | Charles F. Cochran | D | MO-04 | March 4, 1897 | 3rd term | |
| 120 | William Connell | R | PA-11 | March 4, 1897 | 3rd term | Left the House in 1903. |
| 121 | James Cooney | D | MO-07 | March 4, 1897 | 3rd term | Left the House in 1903. |
| 122 | William S. Cowherd | D | MO-05 | March 4, 1897 | 3rd term | |
| 123 | Edgar D. Crumpacker | R | IN-10 | March 4, 1897 | 3rd term | |
| 124 | Robert C. Davey | D | LA-02 | March 4, 1897; Previous service, 1893–1895. | 4th term* | |
| 125 | James H. Davidson | R | WI-06 | March 4, 1897 | 3rd term | |
| 126 | Robert Wyche Davis | D | FL-02 | March 4, 1897 | 3rd term | |
| 127 | Reese C. De Graffenreid | D | TX-03 | March 4, 1897 | 3rd term | Died on August 29, 1902. |
| 128 | William Elliott | D | SC-01 | March 4, 1897; Previous service, 1887–1890, 1891–1893 and 1895–1896. | 7th term*** | Left the House in 1903. |
| 129 | William Henry Fleming | D | GA-10 | March 4, 1897 | 3rd term | Left the House in 1903. |
| 130 | Andrew F. Fox | D | MS-04 | March 4, 1897 | 3rd term | Left the House in 1903. |
| 131 | John W. Gaines | D | TN-06 | March 4, 1897 | 3rd term | |
| 132 | James M. Griggs | D | GA-02 | March 4, 1897 | 3rd term | |
| 133 | Edward L. Hamilton | R | MI-04 | March 4, 1897 | 3rd term | |
| 134 | James Hay | D | VA-07 | March 4, 1897 | 3rd term | |
| 135 | Robert Lee Henry | D | TX-07 | March 4, 1897 | 3rd term | |
| 136 | William Marcellus Howard | D | GA-08 | March 4, 1897 | 3rd term | |
| 137 | Thomas M. Jett | D | IL-18 | March 4, 1897 | 3rd term | Left the House in 1903. |
| 138 | John H. Ketcham | R | NY-18 | March 4, 1897; Previous service, 1865–1873 and 1877–1893. | 15th term** | |
| 139 | William Walton Kitchin | D | NC-05 | March 4, 1897 | 3rd term | |
| 140 | John Lamb | D | VA-03 | March 4, 1897 | 3rd term | |
| 141 | Charles B. Landis | R | IN-09 | March 4, 1897 | 3rd term | |
| 142 | S. W. T. Lanham | D | TX-08 | March 4, 1897; Previous service, 1883–1893. | 8th term* | Resigned on January 15, 1903. |
| 143 | Elijah B. Lewis | D | GA-03 | March 4, 1897 | 3rd term | |
| 144 | Lucius Littauer | R | NY-22 | March 4, 1897 | 3rd term | |
| 145 | William C. Lovering | R | MA-12 | March 4, 1897 | 3rd term | |
| 146 | James R. Mann | R | IL-01 | March 4, 1897 | 3rd term | |
| 147 | Robert W. Miers | D | IN-02 | March 4, 1897 | 3rd term | |
| 148 | John A. Moon | D | TN-03 | March 4, 1897 | 3rd term | |
| 149 | Robert P. Morris | R | MN-06 | March 4, 1897 | 3rd term | Left the House in 1903. |
| 150 | Sydney Emanuel Mudd I | R | MD-05 | March 4, 1897; Previous service, 1890–1891. | 4th term* | |
| 151 | James A. Norton | D | OH-13 | March 4, 1897 | 3rd term | Left the House in 1903. |
| 152 | Marlin Edgar Olmsted | R | PA-14 | March 4, 1897 | 3rd term | |
| 153 | Rice Alexander Pierce | D | TN-09 | March 4, 1897; Previous service, 1883–1885 and 1889–1893. | 6th term** | |
| 154 | John Stockdale Rhea | D | KY-03 | March 4, 1897 | 3rd term | Resigned on March 25, 1902. |
| 155 | John Franklin Rixey | D | VA-08 | March 4, 1897 | 3rd term | |
| 156 | Edward Robb | D | MO-13 | March 4, 1897 | 3rd term | |
| 157 | James M. Robinson | D | IN-12 | March 4, 1897 | 3rd term | |
| 158 | William B. Shattuc | R | OH-01 | March 4, 1897 | 3rd term | Left the House in 1903. |
| 159 | Carlos D. Shelden | R | MI-12 | March 4, 1897 | 3rd term | Left the House in 1903. |
| 160 | Thetus W. Sims | D | TN-08 | March 4, 1897 | 3rd term | |
| 161 | James Luther Slayden | D | TX-12 | March 4, 1897 | 3rd term | |
| 162 | David Highbaugh Smith | D | KY-04 | March 4, 1897 | 3rd term | |
| 163 | Samuel William Smith | R | MI-06 | March 4, 1897 | 3rd term | |
| 164 | William Ledyard Stark | P | NE-04 | March 4, 1897 | 3rd term | Left the House in 1903. |
| 165 | John Hall Stephens | D | TX-13 | March 4, 1897 | 3rd term | |
| 166 | Frederick Stevens | R | MN-04 | March 4, 1897 | 3rd term | |
| 167 | George W. Taylor | D | AL-01 | March 4, 1897 | 3rd term | |
| 168 | Thomas H. Tongue | R | OR-01 | March 4, 1897 | 3rd term | Died on January 11, 1903. |
| 169 | Oscar Underwood | D | AL-09 | March 4, 1897; Previous service, 1895–1896. | 4th term* | |
| 170 | Willard Duncan Vandiver | D | MO-14 | March 4, 1897 | 3rd term | |
| 171 | Charles K. Wheeler | D | KY-01 | March 4, 1897 | 3rd term | Left the House in 1903. |
| 172 | James R. Young | R | PA-04 | March 4, 1897 | 3rd term | Left the House in 1903. |
| 173 | William T. Zenor | D | IN-03 | March 4, 1897 | 3rd term | |
| 174 | Joseph Baltzell Showalter | R | PA-25 | April 20, 1897 | 3rd term | Left the House in 1903. |
| 175 | James Tilghman Lloyd | D | MO-01 | June 1, 1897 | 3rd term | |
| 176 | Edwin C. Burleigh | R | ME-03 | June 21, 1897 | 3rd term | |
| 177 | George P. Lawrence | R | MA-01 | November 2, 1897 | 3rd term | |
| 178 | Henry Sherman Boutell | R | IL-06 | November 23, 1897 | 3rd term | |
| 179 | Francis M. Griffith | D | IN-04 | December 6, 1897 | 3rd term | |
| 180 | William S. Greene | R | MA-13 | May 31, 1898 | 3rd term | |
| 181 | Thomas Spight | D | MS-02 | July 5, 1898 | 3rd term | |
| 182 | Charles W. F. Dick | R | OH-19 | November 8, 1898 | 3rd term | |
| 183 | William Harrison Graham | R | PA-23 | November 29, 1898 | 3rd term | Left the House in 1903. |
| 184 | Frank A. McLain | D | MS-06 | December 12, 1898 | 3rd term | |
| 185 | Henry Dixon Allen | D | KY-02 | March 4, 1899 | 2nd term | Left the House in 1903. |
| 186 | John Dillard Bellamy | D | NC-06 | March 4, 1899 | 2nd term | Left the House in 1903. |
| 187 | Vincent Boreing | R | KY-11 | March 4, 1899 | 2nd term | |
| 188 | Justin De Witt Bowersock | R | KS-02 | March 4, 1899 | 2nd term | |
| 189 | Phanor Breazeale | D | LA-04 | March 4, 1899 | 2nd term | |
| 190 | Abraham L. Brick | R | IN-13 | March 4, 1899 | 2nd term | |
| 191 | Charles H. Burke | R | SD | March 4, 1899 | 2nd term | |
| 192 | Elmer Burkett | R | NE-01 | March 4, 1899 | 2nd term | |
| 193 | Albert S. Burleson | D | TX-10 | March 4, 1899 | 2nd term | |
| 194 | John L. Burnett | D | AL-07 | March 4, 1899 | 2nd term | |
| 195 | William A. Calderhead | R | KS-05 | March 4, 1899; Previous service, 1895–1897. | 3rd term* | |
| 196 | Ben F. Caldwell | D | IL-17 | March 4, 1899 | 2nd term | |
| 197 | George W. Cromer | R | IN-08 | March 4, 1899 | 2nd term | |
| 198 | Joseph B. Crowley | D | IL-19 | March 4, 1899 | 2nd term | |
| 199 | Francis W. Cushman | R | WA | March 4, 1899 | 2nd term | |
| 200 | Herman Dahle | R | WI-02 | March 4, 1899 | 2nd term | Left the House in 1903. |
| 201 | Michael E. Driscoll | R | NY-27 | March 4, 1899 | 2nd term | |
| 202 | John Dougherty | D | MO-03 | March 4, 1899 | 2nd term | |
| 203 | Louis W. Emerson | R | NY-23 | March 4, 1899 | 2nd term | Left the House in 1903. |
| 204 | John J. Esch | R | WI-07 | March 4, 1899 | 2nd term | |
| 205 | David E. Finley | D | SC-05 | March 4, 1899 | 2nd term | |
| 206 | John J. Fitzgerald | D | NY-02 | March 4, 1899 | 2nd term | |
| 207 | Joseph W. Fordney | R | MI-08 | March 4, 1899 | 2nd term | |
| 208 | George Peter Foster | D | IL-03 | March 4, 1899 | 2nd term | |
| 209 | Washington Gardner | R | MI-03 | March 4, 1899 | 2nd term | |
| 210 | George G. Gilbert | D | KY-08 | March 4, 1899 | 2nd term | |
| 211 | Robert B. Gordon | D | OH-04 | March 4, 1899 | 2nd term | Left the House in 1903. |
| 212 | James Knox Polk Hall | D | PA-28 | March 4, 1899 | 2nd term | Resigned on November 29, 1902. |
| 213 | Gilbert N. Haugen | R | IA-04 | March 4, 1899 | 2nd term | |
| 214 | Thomas Hedge | R | IA-01 | March 4, 1899 | 2nd term | |
| 215 | Summers Melville Jack | R | PA-21 | March 4, 1899 | 2nd term | Left the House in 1903. |
| 216 | Wesley Livsey Jones | R | WA | March 4, 1899 | 2nd term | |
| 217 | Julius Kahn | R | CA-04 | March 4, 1899 | 2nd term | Left the House in 1903. |
| 218 | Theodore F. Kluttz | D | NC-07 | March 4, 1899 | 2nd term | |
| 219 | Chester I. Long | R | KS-07 | March 4, 1899; Previous service, 1895–1897. | 3rd term* | Resigned on March 4, 1903. |
| 220 | Victor H. Metcalf | R | CA-03 | March 4, 1899 | 2nd term | |
| 221 | James Monroe Miller | R | KS-04 | March 4, 1899 | 2nd term | |
| 222 | Malcolm A. Moody | R | OR-02 | March 4, 1899 | 2nd term | Left the House in 1903. |
| 223 | Franklin Wheeler Mondell | R | WY | March 4, 1899; Previous service, 1895–1897. | 3rd term* | |
| 224 | Stephen Morgan | R | OH-10 | March 4, 1899 | 2nd term | |
| 225 | Nicholas Muller | D | NY-07 | March 4, 1899; Previous service, 1877–1881 and 1883–1887. | 6th term** | Resigned on November 20, 1901. |
| 226 | Henry F. Naphen | D | MA-10 | March 4, 1899 | 2nd term | Left the House in 1903. |
| 227 | James C. Needham | R | CA-07 | March 4, 1899 | 2nd term | |
| 228 | George Alexander Pearre | R | MD-06 | March 4, 1899 | 2nd term | |
| 229 | Rufus King Polk | D | PA-17 | March 4, 1899 | 2nd term | Died on March 5, 1902. |
| 230 | William Augustus Reeder | R | KS-06 | March 4, 1899 | 2nd term | |
| 231 | William Francis Rhea | D | VA-09 | March 4, 1899 | 2nd term | Left the House in 1903. |
| 232 | Ernest W. Roberts | R | MA-07 | March 4, 1899 | 2nd term | |
| 233 | John Seaton Robinson | D | NE-03 | March 4, 1899 | 2nd term | Left the House in 1903. |
| 234 | William W. Rucker | D | MO-02 | March 4, 1899 | 2nd term | |
| 235 | Jacob Ruppert | D | NY-15 | March 4, 1899 | 2nd term | |
| 236 | William H. Ryan | D | NY-32 | March 4, 1899 | 2nd term | |
| 237 | Joshua S. Salmon | D | NJ-04 | March 4, 1899 | 2nd term | Died on May 6, 1902. |
| 238 | John Levi Sheppard | D | TX-04 | March 4, 1899 | 2nd term | Died on October 11, 1902. |
| 239 | Joseph C. Sibley | R | PA-27 | March 4, 1899; Previous service, 1893–1895. | 3rd term* | |
| 240 | John Humphrey Small | D | NC-01 | March 4, 1899 | 2nd term | |
| 241 | Henry C. Smith | R | MI-02 | March 4, 1899 | 2nd term | Left the House in 1903. |
| 242 | Charles Edward Snodgrass | D | TN-04 | March 4, 1899 | 2nd term | Left the House in 1903. |
| 243 | John Knox Stewart | R | NY-21 | March 4, 1899 | 2nd term | Left the House in 1903. |
| 244 | John R. Thayer | D | MA-03 | March 4, 1899 | 2nd term | |
| 245 | Charles R. Thomas | D | NC-03 | March 4, 1899 | 2nd term | |
| 246 | Lot Thomas | R | IA-11 | March 4, 1899 | 2nd term | |
| 247 | Arthur S. Tompkins | R | NY-17 | March 4, 1899 | 2nd term | Left the House in 1903. |
| 248 | Frank Charles Wachter | R | MD-03 | March 4, 1899 | 2nd term | |
| 249 | James Eli Watson | R | IN-06 | March 4, 1899; Previous service, 1895–1897. | 3rd term* | |
| 250 | Edgar Weeks | R | MI-07 | March 4, 1899 | 2nd term | Left the House in 1903. |
| 251 | James R. Williams | D | IL-20 | March 4, 1899; Previous service, 1889–1895. | 5th term* | |
| 252 | Frank E. Wilson | D | NY-05 | March 4, 1899 | 2nd term | |
| 253 | Charles Frederick Wright | R | PA-15 | March 4, 1899 | 2nd term | |
| 254 | Charles E. Littlefield | R | ME-02 | June 19, 1899 | 2nd term | |
| 255 | Joseph E. Ransdell | D | LA-05 | August 29, 1899 | 2nd term | |
| 256 | Dorsey W. Shackleford | D | MO-08 | August 29, 1899 | 2nd term | |
| 257 | Amos L. Allen | R | ME-01 | November 6, 1899 | 2nd term | |
| 258 | Henry Dickinson Green | D | PA-09 | November 7, 1899 | 2nd term | Left the House in 1903. |
| 259 | Edward B. Vreeland | R | NY-34 | November 7, 1899 | 2nd term | |
| 260 | Joseph J. Gill | R | OH-16 | December 4, 1899 | 2nd term | |
| 261 | William Neville | P | NE-06 | December 4, 1899 | 2nd term | Left the House in 1903. |
| 262 | Francis R. Lassiter | D | VA-04 | April 19, 1900 | 2nd term | Left the House in 1903. |
| 263 | William N. Richardson | D | AL-08 | August 6, 1900 | 2nd term | |
| 264 | Edward de Veaux Morrell | R | PA-05 | November 6, 1900 | 2nd term | |
| 265 | Allan Langdon McDermott | D | NJ-07 | December 3, 1900 | 2nd term | |
| 266 | Walter I. Smith | R | IA-09 | December 3, 1900 | 2nd term | |
| 267 | Samuel D. Woods | R | CA-02 | December 3, 1900 | 2nd term | Left the House in 1903. |
| 268 | James Perry Conner | R | IA-10 | December 4, 1900 | 2nd term | |
| 269 | L. Heisler Ball | R | DE | March 4, 1901 | 1st term | Left the House in 1903. |
| 270 | Arthur Laban Bates | R | PA-26 | March 4, 1901 | 1st term | |
| 271 | Jacob A. Beidler | R | OH-20 | March 4, 1901 | 1st term | |
| 272 | Oliver Belmont | D | NY-13 | March 4, 1901 | 1st term | Left the House in 1903. |
| 273 | Edmond Spencer Blackburn | R | NC-08 | March 4, 1901 | 1st term | Left the House in 1903. |
| 274 | Albert Blakeney | R | MD-02 | March 4, 1901 | 1st term | Left the House in 1903. |
| 275 | Sydney J. Bowie | D | AL-04 | March 4, 1901 | 1st term | |
| 276 | James Joseph Butler | D | MO-12 | March 4, 1901 | 1st term | Resigned on June 28, 1902. Returned and served from November 4, 1902 to February 26, 1903. |
| 277 | Henry Bristow | R | NY-03 | March 4, 1901 | 1st term | Left the House in 1903. |
| 278 | Webster E. Brown | R | WI-09 | March 4, 1901 | 1st term | |
| 279 | George Farmer Burgess | D | TX-09 | March 4, 1901 | 1st term | |
| 280 | Henry Burk | R | PA-03 | March 4, 1901 | 1st term | |
| 281 | Ezekiel S. Candler, Jr. | D | MS-01 | March 4, 1901 | 1st term | |
| 282 | John W. Cassingham | D | OH-17 | March 4, 1901 | 1st term | |
| 283 | Thomas J. Creamer | D | NY-08 | March 4, 1901; Previous service, 1873–1875. | 2nd term* | Left the House in 1903. |
| 284 | Joseph A. Conry | D | MA-09 | March 4, 1901 | 1st term | Left the House in 1903. |
| 285 | Frank Coombs | R | CA-01 | March 4, 1901 | 1st term | Left the House in 1903. |
| 286 | Frank Dunklee Currier | R | NH-02 | March 4, 1901 | 1st term | |
| 287 | Archibald B. Darragh | R | MI-11 | March 4, 1901 | 1st term | |
| 288 | Elias Deemer | R | PA-16 | March 4, 1901 | 1st term | |
| 289 | William H. Douglas | R | NY-14 | March 4, 1901 | 1st term | |
| 290 | William Henry Draper | R | NY-19 | March 4, 1901 | 1st term | |
| 291 | Caldwell Edwards | P | MT | March 4, 1901 | 1st term | Left the House in 1903. |
| 292 | Alvin Evans | R | PA-20 | March 4, 1901 | 1st term | |
| 293 | John J. Feely | D | IL-02 | March 4, 1901 | 1st term | Left the House in 1903. |
| 294 | Henry D. Flood | D | VA-10 | March 4, 1901 | 1st term | |
| 295 | Robert H. Foerderer | R | PA | March 4, 1901 | 1st term | |
| 296 | David J. Foster | R | VT-01 | March 4, 1901 | 1st term | |
| 297 | Joseph H. Gaines | R | WV-03 | March 4, 1901 | 1st term | |
| 298 | Thomas L. Glenn | P | ID | March 4, 1901 | 1st term | Left the House in 1903. |
| 299 | Henry M. Goldfogle | D | NY-09 | March 4, 1901 | 1st term | |
| 300 | Daniel Linn Gooch | D | KY-06 | March 4, 1901 | 1st term | |
| 301 | Harry A. Hanbury | R | NY-04 | March 4, 1901 | 1st term | Left the House in 1903. |
| 302 | Kittredge Haskins | R | VT-02 | March 4, 1901 | 1st term | |
| 303 | Pat Henry | D | MS-03 | March 4, 1901 | 1st term | Left the House in 1903. |
| 304 | Charles Q. Hildebrant | R | OH-06 | March 4, 1901 | 1st term | |
| 305 | Elias S. Holliday | R | IN-05 | March 4, 1901 | 1st term | |
| 306 | Charles E. Hooker | D | MS-07 | March 4, 1901; Previous service, 1875–1883 and 1887–1895. | 9th term** | Left the House in 1903. |
| 307 | James A. Hughes | R | WV-04 | March 4, 1901 | 1st term | |
| 308 | Harvey Samuel Irwin | R | KY-05 | March 4, 1901 | 1st term | Left the House in 1903. |
| 309 | Alfred Metcalf Jackson | D | KS-03 | March 4, 1901 | 1st term | Left the House in 1903. |
| 310 | William Humphreys Jackson | R | MD-01 | March 4, 1901 | 1st term | |
| 311 | Joseph T. Johnson | D | SC-04 | March 4, 1901 | 1st term | |
| 312 | James Nicholas Kehoe | D | KY-09 | March 4, 1901 | 1st term | |
| 313 | Fred J. Kern | D | IL-21 | March 4, 1901 | 1st term | Left the House in 1903. |
| 314 | Claude Kitchin | D | NC-02 | March 4, 1901 | 1st term | |
| 315 | Thomas B. Kyle | R | OH-07 | March 4, 1901 | 1st term | |
| 316 | Robert Jacob Lewis | R | PA-19 | March 4, 1901 | 1st term | Left the House in 1903. |
| 317 | George H. Lindsay | D | NY-06 | March 4, 1901 | 1st term | |
| 318 | William Frank Mahoney | D | IL-05 | March 4, 1901 | 1st term | |
| 319 | Thomas Frank Marshall | R | ND | March 4, 1901 | 1st term | |
| 320 | Eben Martin | R | SD | March 4, 1901 | 1st term | |
| 321 | Harry L. Maynard | D | VA-02 | March 4, 1901 | 1st term | |
| 322 | James McAndrews | D | IL-04 | March 4, 1901 | 1st term | |
| 323 | James McLachlan | R | CA-06 | March 4, 1901; Previous service, 1895–1897. | 2nd term* | |
| 324 | J. Ross Mickey | D | IL-15 | March 4, 1901 | 1st term | Left the House in 1903. |
| 325 | James M. Moody | R | NC-09 | March 4, 1901 | 1st term | Died on February 5, 1903. |
| 326 | Howard Mutchler | D | PA-08 | March 4, 1901; Previous service, 1893–1895. | 2nd term* | Left the House in 1903. |
| 327 | Robert M. Nevin | R | OH-03 | March 4, 1901 | 1st term | |
| 328 | Lemuel P. Padgett | D | TN-07 | March 4, 1901 | 1st term | |
| 329 | Henry Wilbur Palmer | R | PA-12 | March 4, 1901 | 1st term | |
| 330 | George Robert Patterson | R | PA-13 | March 4, 1901 | 1st term | |
| 331 | Malcolm R. Patterson | D | TN-10 | March 4, 1901 | 1st term | |
| 332 | James Breck Perkins | R | NY-31 | March 4, 1901 | 1st term | |
| 333 | Edward W. Pou | D | NC-04 | March 4, 1901 | 1st term | |
| 334 | Samuel L. Powers | R | MA-11 | March 4, 1901 | 1st term | |
| 335 | Cornelius Amory Pugsley | D | NY-16 | March 4, 1901 | 1st term | Left the House in 1903. |
| 336 | Choice B. Randell | D | TX-05 | March 4, 1901 | 1st term | |
| 337 | Charles C. Reid | D | AR-04 | March 4, 1901 | 1st term | |
| 338 | John N. W. Rumple | R | IA-02 | March 4, 1901 | 1st term | Died on January 31, 1903. |
| 339 | Robert B. Scarborough | D | SC-06 | March 4, 1901 | 1st term | |
| 340 | Charles Reginald Schirm | R | MD-04 | March 4, 1901 | 1st term | Left the House in 1903. |
| 341 | Charles Frederick Scott | R | KS | March 4, 1901 | 1st term | |
| 342 | Thomas J. Selby | D | IL-16 | March 4, 1901 | 1st term | Left the House in 1903. |
| 343 | Ashton C. Shallenberger | D | NE-05 | March 4, 1901 | 1st term | Left the House in 1903. |
| 344 | William W. Skiles | R | OH-14 | March 4, 1901 | 1st term | |
| 345 | John S. Snook | D | OH-05 | March 4, 1901 | 1st term | |
| 346 | Frederic Storm | R | NY-01 | March 4, 1901 | 1st term | Left the House in 1903. |
| 347 | George N. Southwick | R | NY-20 | March 4, 1901; Previous service, 1895–1899. | 3rd term* | |
| 348 | George Sutherland | R | UT | March 4, 1901 | 1st term | Left the House in 1903. |
| 349 | Charles Winston Thompson | D | AL-05 | March 4, 1901 | 1st term | |
| 350 | Charles Q. Tirrell | R | MA-04 | March 4, 1901 | 1st term | |
| 351 | South Trimble | D | KY-07 | March 4, 1901 | 1st term | |
| 352 | Emmett Tompkins | R | OH-12 | March 4, 1901 | 1st term | Left the House in 1903. |
| 353 | William R. Warnock | R | OH-08 | March 4, 1901 | 1st term | |
| 354 | James Bamford White | D | KY-10 | March 4, 1901 | 1st term | Left the House in 1903. |
| 355 | Ariosto A. Wiley | D | AL-02 | March 4, 1901 | 1st term | |
| | Llewellyn Powers | R | ME-04 | April 8, 1901; Previous service, 1877–1879. | 2nd term* | |
| | Dudley G. Wooten | D | TX-06 | July 13, 1901 | 1st term | Left the House in 1903. |
| | Henry H. Aplin | R | MI-10 | October 15, 1901 | 1st term | Left the House in 1903. |
| | Henry B. Cassel | R | PA-10 | November 5, 1901 | 1st term | |
| | Charles L. Knapp | R | NY-24 | November 5, 1901 | 1st term | |
| | Asbury Francis Lever | D | SC-07 | November 5, 1901 | 1st term | |
| | Montague Lessler | R | NY-07 | January 7, 1902 | 1st term | Left the House in 1903. |
| | J. McKenzie Moss | R | KY-03 | March 25, 1902 | 1st term | Left the House in 1903. |
| | De Witt C. Flanagan | D | NJ-04 | June 18, 1902 | 1st term | Left the House in 1903. |
| | Alexander Billmeyer | D | PA-17 | November 4, 1902 | 1st term | Left the House in 1903. |
| | Frank B. Brandegee | R | CT-03 | November 4, 1902 | 1st term | |
| | John Wilbur Dwight | R | NY-26 | November 4, 1902 | 1st term | |
| | Augustus Peabody Gardner | R | MA-06 | November 4, 1902 | 1st term | |
| | Carter Glass | D | VA-06 | November 4, 1902 | 1st term | |
| | Gordon J. Russell | D | TX-03 | November 4, 1902 | 1st term | Left the House in 1903. |
| | Morris Sheppard | D | TX-04 | November 15, 1902 | 1st term | |
| | Edward Swann | D | NY-10 | December 1, 1902 | 1st term | Left the House in 1903. |
| | George Chester Robinson Wagoner | R | MO-12 | February 26, 1903 | 1st term | Left the House in 1903. |

== Delegates ==
| Rank | Delegate | Party | District | Seniority date (Previous service, if any) | No.# of term(s) | Notes |
|---|---|---|---|---|---|---|
| 1 | Dennis Thomas Flynn | R | OK | March 4, 1899; Previous service, 1893–1897. | 4th term* | |
| 2 | Robert William Wilcox | Ind | HI | November 6, 1900 | 2nd term | |
| 3 | Federico Degetau | R | PR | March 4, 1901 | 1st term | |
| 4 | Bernard Shandon Rodey | R | NM | March 4, 1901 | 1st term | |
| 5 | Marcus A. Smith | D | AZ | March 4, 1901; Previous service, 1887–1895 and 1897–1899. | 6th term** | |

== See also ==
- 57th United States Congress
- List of United States congressional districts
- List of United States senators in the 57th Congress
