= William W. Griest =

American politician (1858–1929)

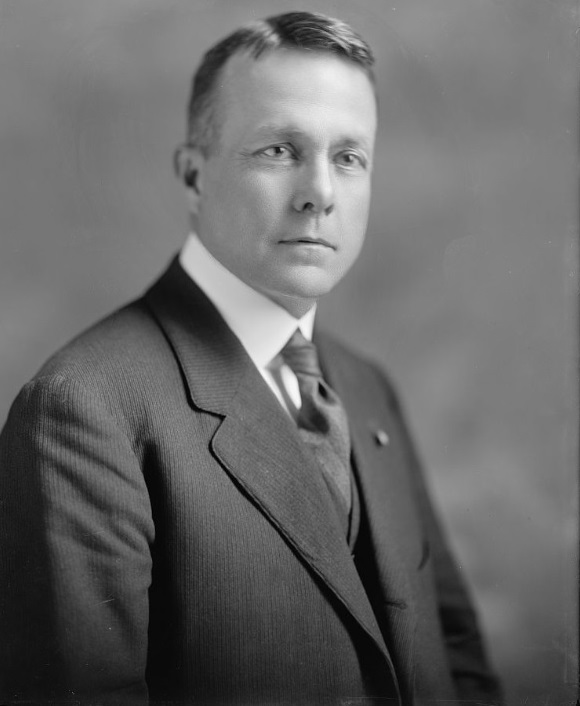
- Griest, 1905–1929

Member of the U.S. House of Representatives from Pennsylvania
- In office March 4, 1909 – December 5, 1929
- Preceded by: Henry B. Cassel
- Succeeded by: J. Roland Kinzer
- Constituency: 9th district (1909–1923); 10th district (1923–1929)

Personal details
- Born: William Walton Griest; September 22, 1858 Christiana, Pennsylvania, U.S.
- Died: December 5, 1929 (aged 71) Mount Clemens, Michigan, U.S.
- Party: Republican

William Walton Griest (September 22, 1858 – December 5, 1929) was a Republican member of the U.S. House of Representatives from Pennsylvania.

== Biography ==
William W. Griest was born in Christiana, Pennsylvania. He graduated from the Millersville State Normal School in 1876. He was engaged in teaching, and was a member of the city school board of Lancaster, Pennsylvania, for twenty-four years. He was the director and an incorporator of the Pennsylvania Public School Memorial Association. From 1882 to 1888, he was engaged in newspaper work as editor of the Inquirer, Lancaster, Pennsylvania. He served as chief clerk in the county commissioner's office. He was a member of the Pennsylvania Tax Commission, and a delegate to several Republican State conventions and to every Republican National Convention from 1896 to 1928. He was the Secretary of the Commonwealth of Pennsylvania from 1899 to 1903. He served as a member of the State sinking fund commission and of the board of pardons. He also served as president of lighting and street railway companies from 1903 to 1927.

Griest was elected as a Republican to the Sixty-first and to the ten succeeding Congresses and served until his death at Mount Clemens, Michigan. He served as chairman of the United States House Committee on Post Office and Post Roads during the Sixty-eighth through the Seventieth Congresses. He was laid to rest at Woodward Hill Cemetery in Lancaster.

The W. W. Griest Building in downtown Lancaster is named in his honor.

== See also ==
- List of members of the United States Congress who died in office (1900–1949)

== Sources ==
- United States Congress. "William W. Griest (id: G000456)". Biographical Directory of the United States Congress.
- The Political Graveyard
- US House of Representatives (1930). William W. Griest, Late a Representative from Pennsylvania. Washington, DC: US Government Printing Office.

U.S. House of Representatives
Preceded by Henry B. Cassel	Member of the U.S. House of Representatives from Pennsylvania's 9th congressional district 1909–1923	Succeeded by Henry Winfield Watson
Preceded by Charles R. Connell	Member of the U.S. House of Representatives from Pennsylvania's 10th congressional district 1923–1929	Succeeded by J. Roland Kinzer
