= List of United States senators in the 58th Congress =

This is a complete list of United States senators during the 58th United States Congress listed by seniority from March 4, 1903, to March 3, 1905.

Order of service is based on the commencement of the senator's first term. Behind this is former service as a senator (only giving the senator seniority within their new incoming class), service as vice president, a House member, a cabinet secretary, or a governor of a state. The final factor is the population of the senator's state.

Senators who were sworn in during the middle of the Congress (up until the last senator who was not sworn in early after winning the November 1904 election) are listed at the end of the list with no number.

== Terms of service ==
| Class | Terms of service of senators that expired in years |
|---|---|
| Class 1 | Terms of service of senators that expired in 1905 (CA, CT, DE, FL, IN, MA, MD, ME, MI, MN, MO, MS, MT, ND, NE, NJ, NV, NY, OH, PA, RI, TN, TX, UT, VA, VT, WA, WI, WV, and WY.) |
| Class 2 | Terms of service of senators that expired in 1907 (AL, AR, CO, DE, GA, IA, ID, IL, KS, KY, LA, MA, ME, MI, MN, MS, MT, NC, NE, NH, NJ, OR, RI, SC, SD, TN, TX, VA, WV, and WY.) |
| Class 3 | Terms of service of senators that expired in 1909 (AL, AR, CA, CO, CT, FL, GA, ID, IL, IN, IA, KS, KY, LA, MD, MO, NC, ND, NH, NV, NY, OH, OR, PA, SC, SD, UT, VT, WA, and WI.) |

== U.S. Senate seniority list ==
U.S. Senate seniority
| Rank | Senator (party-state) | Seniority date | Other factors |
|---|---|---|---|
| 1 | William B. Allison (R-IA) | March 4, 1873 | Former representative |
| 2 | Francis Cockrell (D-MO) | March 4, 1875 | |
| 3 | George F. Hoar (R-MA) | March 4, 1877 | Former representative |
| 4 | John Tyler Morgan (D-AL) | March 4, 1877 | |
| 5 | Orville H. Platt (R-CT) | March 4, 1879 | |
| 6 | Eugene Hale (R-ME) | March 4, 1881 | Former representative (10 years) |
| 7 | Joseph Hawley (R-CT) | March 4, 1881 | Former representative (5 years) |
| 8 | William P. Frye (R-ME) | March 18, 1881 | Previously a senator |
| 9 | Nelson Aldrich (R-RI) | October 5, 1881 | Former representative |
| 10 | Shelby Moore Cullom (R-IL) | March 4, 1883 | Former governor, Former representative |
| 11 | Henry M. Teller (D-CO) | March 4, 1885 | Previously a senator |
| 12 | James H. Berry (D-AR) | March 20, 1885 | Former governor |
| 13 | William M. Stewart (R-NV) | March 4, 1887 | Previously a senator |
| 14 | John W. Daniel (D-VA) | March 4, 1887 | Former representative |
| 15 | William B. Bate (D-TN) | March 4, 1887 | Former governor |
| 16 | Jacob H. Gallinger (R-NH) | March 4, 1891 | Former representative (4 years) |
| 17 | Henry C. Hansbrough (R-ND) | March 4, 1891 | Former representative (2 years) |
| 18 | Redfield Proctor (R-VT) | November 2, 1891 | Former governor |
| 19 | Henry Cabot Lodge (R-MA) | March 4, 1893 | Former representative |
| 20 | George C. Perkins (R-CA) | July 26, 1893 | Former governor |
| 21 | Julius C. Burrows (R-MI) | January 23, 1895 | Former representative |
| 22 | Clarence D. Clark (R-WY) | January 24, 1895 | |
| 23 | Francis E. Warren (R-WY) | March 4, 1895 | Previously a senator |
| 24 | Stephen Elkins (R-WV) | March 4, 1895 | Former delegate, former cabinet member |
| 25 | Knute Nelson (R-MN) | March 4, 1895 | Former governor, Minnesota 20th in population (1890) |
| 26 | Benjamin Tillman (D-SC) | March 4, 1895 | Former governor, South Carolina 23rd in population (1890) |
| 27 | George P. Wetmore (R-RI) | March 4, 1895 | Former governor, Rhode Island 36th in population (1890) |
| 28 | Augustus O. Bacon (D-GA) | March 4, 1895 | Georgia 12th in population (1890) |
| 29 | Thomas S. Martin (D-VA) | March 4, 1895 | Virginia 15th in population (1890) |
| 30 | John C. Spooner (R-WI) | March 4, 1897 | Previously a senator (6 years) |
| 31 | Thomas C. Platt (R-NY) | March 4, 1897 | Previously a senator (2 months) |
| 32 | Joseph Foraker (R-OH) | March 4, 1897 | Former governor, Ohio 4th in population (1890) |
| 33 | Samuel McEnery (D-LA) | March 4, 1897 | Former governor, Louisiana 25th in population (1890) |
| 34 | Boies Penrose (R-PA) | March 4, 1897 | Pennsylvania 2nd in population (1890) |
| 35 | Charles W. Fairbanks (R-IN) | March 4, 1897 | Indiana 8th in population (1890) |
| 36 | Alexander Clay (D-GA) | March 4, 1897 | Georgia 12th in population (1890) |
| 37 | Edmund Pettus (D-AL) | March 4, 1897 | Alabama 17th in population (1890) |
| 38 | Mark Hanna (R-OH) | March 6, 1897 | |
| 39 | Stephen Mallory (D-FL) | May 15, 1897 | |
| 40 | Hernando Money (D-MS) | October 8, 1897 | Former representative |
| 41 | Louis McComas (R-MD) | March 4, 1899 | Former representative (8 years) |
| 42 | John Kean (R-NJ) | March 4, 1899 | Former representative (4 years) |
| 43 | Charles A. Culberson (D-TX) | March 4, 1899 | Former governor |
| 44 | Chauncey Depew (R-NY) | March 4, 1899 | New York 1st in population (1890) |
| 45 | Albert J. Beveridge (R-IN) | March 4, 1899 | Indiana 8th in population (1890) |
| 46 | Joseph Quarles (R-WI) | March 4, 1899 | Wisconsin 14th in population (1890) |
| 47 | Nathan B. Scott (R-WV) | March 4, 1899 | West Virginia 28th in population (1890) |
| 48 | Addison Foster (R-WA) | March 4, 1899 | Washington 34th in population (1890) |
| 49 | Porter McCumber (R-ND) | March 4, 1899 | North Dakota 41st in population (1890) |
| 50 | James Taliaferro (D-FL) | April 20, 1899 | |
| 51 | Thomas R. Bard (R-CA) | February 7, 1900 | |
| 52 | Jonathan P. Dolliver (R-IA) | August 22, 1900 | Former representative |
| 53 | William P. Dillingham (R-VT) | October 18, 1900 | |
| 54 | Matthew Quay (R-PA) | January 16, 1901 | Previously a senator |
| 55 | Moses Clapp (R-MN) | January 23, 1901 | Minnesota 20th in population (1890) |
| 56 | Thomas Kearns (R-UT) | January 23, 1901 | Utah 40th in population (1890) |
| 57 | John H. Mitchell (R-OR) | March 4, 1901 | Previously a senator (18 years) |
| 58 | Joseph C. S. Blackburn (D-KY) | March 4, 1901 | Previously a senator (12 years) |
| 59 | Fred Dubois (D-ID) | March 4, 1901 | Previously a senator (6 years) |
| 60 | William A. Clark (D-MT) | March 4, 1901 | Previously a senator (1 year, 2 months) |
| 61 | Anselm J. McLaurin (D-MS) | March 4, 1901 | Previously a senator (1 year, 1 month) |
| 62 | Joseph W. Bailey (D-TX) | March 4, 1901 | Former representative (10 years) |
| 63 | Edward W. Carmack (D-TN) | March 4, 1901 | Former representative (4 years), Tennessee 13th in population (1890) |
| 64 | Robert J. Gamble (R-SD) | March 4, 1901 | Former representative (4 years), South Dakota 35th in population (1890) |
| 65 | Furnifold M. Simmons (D-NC) | March 4, 1901 | Former representative (2 years), North Carolina 16th in population (1890) |
| 66 | Thomas Patterson (D-CO) | March 4, 1901 | Former representative (2 years), Colorado 31st in population (1900) |
| 67 | Murphy J. Foster (D-LA) | March 4, 1901 | Former representative, Former governor |
| 68 | Joseph Burton (R-KS) | March 4, 1901 | Kansas 19th in population (1890) |
| 69 | Henry E. Burnham (R-NH) | March 4, 1901 | New Hampshire 33rd in population (1890) |
| 70 | Paris Gibson (D-MT) | March 7, 1901 | |
| 71 | Charles Dietrich (R-NE) | March 28, 1901 | Former governor |
| 72 | Joseph Millard (R-NE) | March 28, 1901 | |
| 73 | Alfred B. Kittredge (R-SD) | July 1, 1901 | |
| 74 | John F. Dryden (R-NJ) | January 29, 1902 | |
| 75 | Russell A. Alger (R-MI) | September 27, 1902 | |
| 76 | Heisler Ball (R-DE) | March 2, 1903 | Former representative |
| 77 | Frank Allee (R-DE) | March 2, 1903 | |
| 78 | Arthur P. Gorman (D-MD) | March 4, 1903 | Previously a senator |
| 79 | Albert J. Hopkins (R-IL) | March 4, 1903 | Former representative (18 years) |
| 80 | James B. McCreary (D-KY) | March 4, 1903 | Former representative (12 years) |
| 81 | Asbury Latimer (D-SC) | March 4, 1903 | Former representative (10 years), South Carolina 24th in population (1900) |
| 82 | Francis Newlands (D-NV) | March 4, 1903 | Former representative (10 years), Nevada 46th in population (1900) |
| 83 | Chester Long (R-KS) | March 4, 1903 | Former representative (6 years) |
| 84 | William J. Stone (D-MO) | March 4, 1903 | Former governor, Missouri 5th in population (1900) |
| 85 | James P. Clarke (D-AR) | March 4, 1903 | Former governor, Arkansas 25th in population (1900) |
| 86 | Lee S. Overman (D-NC) | March 4, 1903 | North Carolina 15th in population (1900) |
| 87 | Levi Ankeny (R-WA) | March 4, 1903 | Washington 34th in population (1900) |
| 88 | Charles W. Fulton (R-OR) | March 4, 1903 | Oregon 36th in population (1900) |
| 89 | Reed Smoot (R-UT) | March 4, 1903 | Utah 41st in population (1900) |
| 90 | Weldon B. Heyburn (R-ID) | March 4, 1903 | Idaho 44th in population (1900) |
| | Charles Dick (R-OH) | March 23, 1904 | Former representative |
| | Philander C. Knox (R-PA) | June 10, 1904 | |
| | Winthrop M. Crane (R-MA) | October 12, 1904 | |

== See also ==
- 58th United States Congress
- List of United States representatives in the 58th Congress
