= Patrick McLane =

Irish-born American politician (1875–1946)

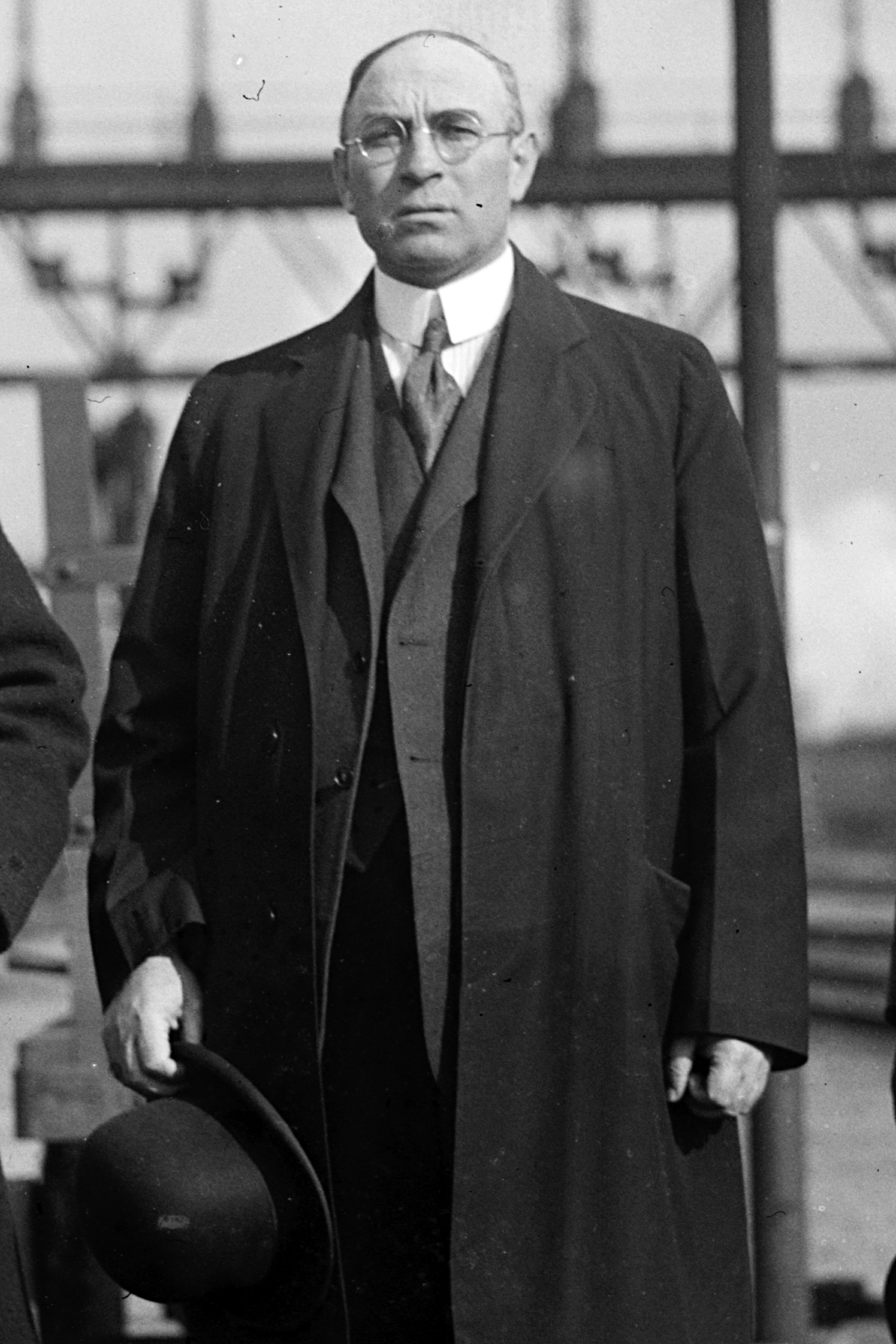
- McLane, between 1918 and 1920

Member of the U.S. House of Representatives from Pennsylvania's 10th district
- In office March 4, 1919 – February 25, 1921
- Preceded by: John R. Farr
- Succeeded by: John R. Farr

Personal details
- Born: March 14, 1875 County Mayo, Ireland, UK
- Died: November 13, 1946 (aged 71) Scranton, Pennsylvania, US
- Party: Democratic

Military service
- Allegiance: United States
- Branch/service: United States Army
- Years of service: 1898–1899
- Rank: Lieutenant
- Unit: 11th Infantry Regiment
- Battles/wars: Spanish–American War

Patrick McLane (March 14, 1875 – November 13, 1946) was an Irish-born American politician. He served as a member of the United States House of Representatives from Pennsylvania.

== Biography ==
McLane was born on March 14, 1875 in County Mayo, Ireland. He and his parents immigrated to the United States in 1882, and they moved to Scranton, Pennsylvania. There, he worked in coal mines for thirteen years and attended public schools. He served in the 11th Infantry Regiment of the United States Army in 1898 and 1899, fighting in the Spanish–American War.

After serving in the military, McLane between a locomotive engineer. He also involved himself in politics, serving on the Scranton School Board between 1904 and 1911. A Democrat, he was a delegate of the 1905 Democratic State convention and a member of the 1914 Democratic State committee.

McLane was sworn into the United States House of Representatives on March 4, 1919, representing the 10th district. While in Congress, he supported bonus payments to veterans of World War I and women's suffrage, and opposed Prohibition. He was provisionally seated, but the election was contested. The House investigation found that, in his campaign, McClane had violated the Federal Corrupt Practices Act and that "there was widespread fraud and illegality in the election itself". Once the fraudulent returns were removed, McLane was found to have lost the election to John R. Farr, who succeeded him in office. As a result, he was unseated on February 25, 1921 by a vote of 161-121, and Farr succeeded him. He was an unsuccessful candidate for election in 1922 and in 1924. In 1942, following the death of Patrick J. Boland, he argued before the Supreme Court of the United States that he Democratic nomination for Congress, as Boland won the nomination to McLane, despite being dead; the case was dismissed.

After serving in Congress, McLane returned to work as a locomotive engineer. He was married and had at least six children. He died on November 13, 1946, aged 76, in Scranton. He is buried in Cathedral Cemetery, in Scranton.

U.S. House of Representatives
Preceded by John R. Farr	Member of the U.S. House of Representatives from Pennsylvania's 11th congressional district 1919–1921	Succeeded by John R. Farr
