= John R. Farr =

American politician (1857–1933)

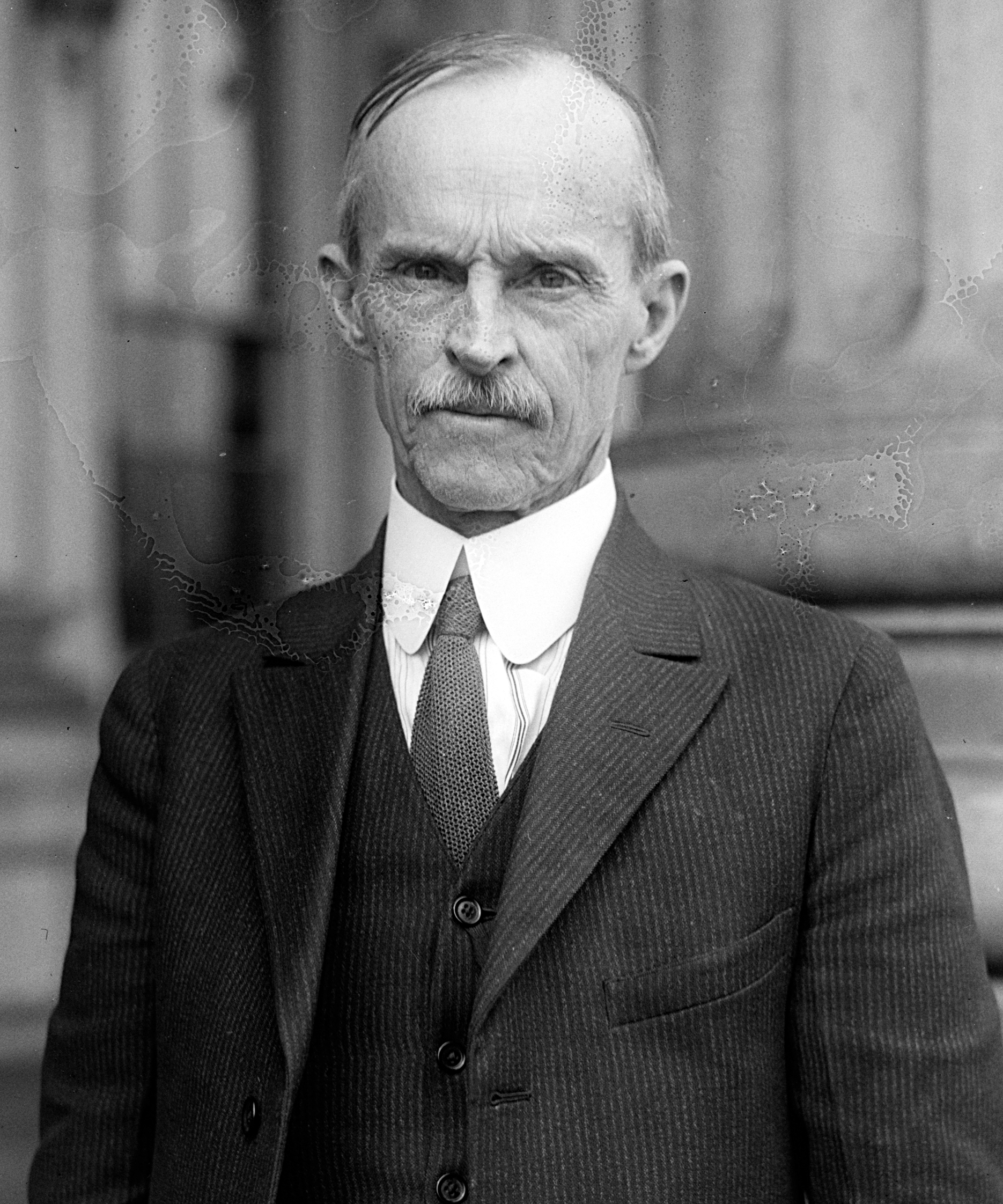
- Farr, between 1921 and 1922

Member of the U.S. House of Representatives from Pennsylvania's 10th district
- In office February 25, 1921 – March 3, 1921
- Preceded by: Patrick McLane
- Succeeded by: Charles Robert Connell
- In office March 4, 1911 – March 3, 1919
- Preceded by: Thomas David Nicholls
- Succeeded by: Patrick McLane

Member of the Pennsylvania House of Representatives
- In office 1891; 1893; 1895; 1897; 1899 (as speaker)

Personal details
- Born: July 18, 1857 Hyde Park, Pennsylvania, US
- Died: December 11, 1933 (aged 76) Scranton, Pennsylvania, US
- Party: Republican
- Education: Lafayette College
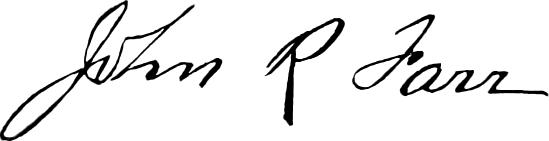
- Signature

John Richard Farr (July 18, 1857 – December 11, 1933) was an American politician. He served as a member of the U.S. House of Representatives from Pennsylvania.

== Biography ==
Farr was born on July 18, 1857, in Hyde Park, Scranton, Pennsylvania, to Edward and Elizabeth Farr. He attended Scranton's School of the Lackawanna and Phillips Academy, then studied at Lafayette College, though never graduated. He worked as a newsboy, journalist, as well as in the real estate business.

For four years, Farr served on the Scranton School Board. A Republican, he was a member of the Pennsylvania House of Representatives in 1891, 1893, 1895, 1897, and 1899, serving as speaker of the 1899 session. As a state legislator, he introduced bills to provide free textbooks to public schools and to make public education compulsory; both measures passed, in 1893 and 1895, respectively.

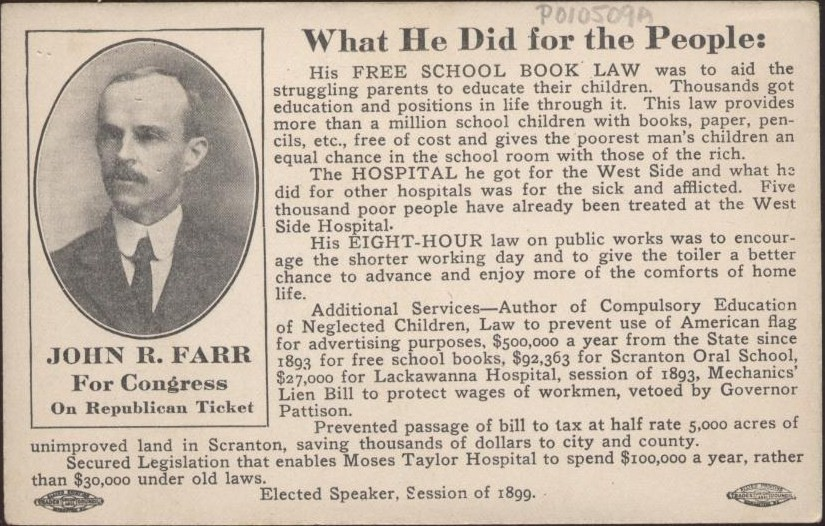
Postcard promoting Farr in his Congressional campaign

A candidate from Pennsylvania's 10th congressional district, Farr was an unsuccessful candidate for election in 1908, but was elected as a Republican to the Sixty-second and to the three succeeding Congresses. He successfully contested the election of Patrick McLane to the Sixty-sixth Congress, though his success came almost at the end of McLane's term. He was an unsuccessful candidate for renomination in 1920, 1930, and 1932.

Farr resumed the real estate business in Scranton. He was married with four children. He died on December 11, 1933, aged 76, in Scranton, from a heart attack. The heart attack hospitalized him at West Side Hospital, which he had helped establish in the 1890s. He was buried on December 12, at Shady Lane Cemetery, in Chinchilla.

== See also ==
- Speaker of the Pennsylvania House of Representatives

U.S. House of Representatives
Preceded by Thomas D. Nicholls	Member of the U.S. House of Representatives from Pennsylvania's 10th congressional district 1911–1919	Succeeded by Patrick McLane
Preceded by Patrick McLane	Member of the U.S. House of Representatives from Pennsylvania's 10th congressional district 1921	Succeeded by Charles R. Connell
