= Charles R. Connell =

American politician (1864–1922)

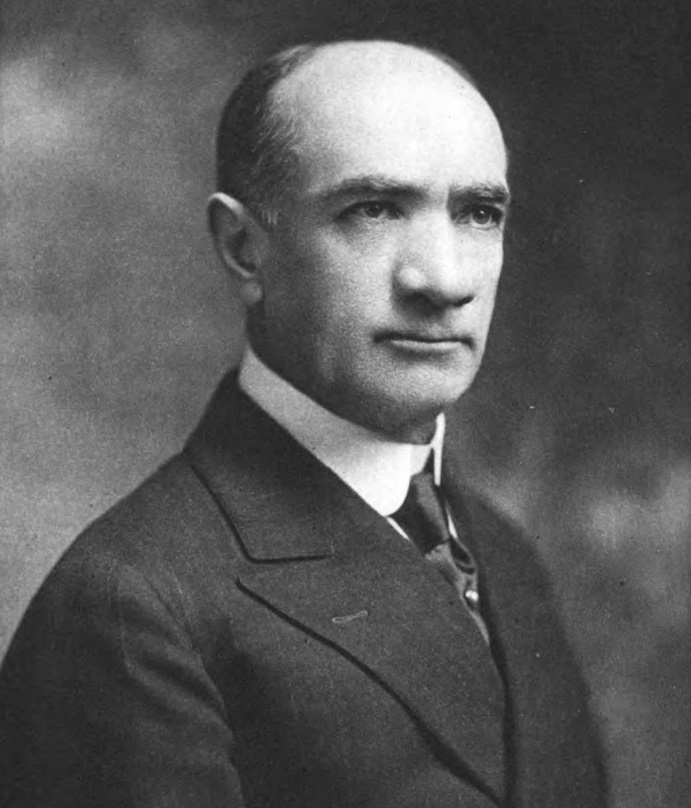
- Frontispiece of 1924's Charles R. Connell, Late a Representative

Member of the U.S. House of Representatives from Pennsylvania's 10th district
- In office March 4, 1921 – September 26, 1922
- Preceded by: John R. Farr
- Succeeded by: William W. Griest

Personal details
- Born: Charles Robert Connell; September 22, 1864 Scranton, Pennsylvania, U.S.
- Died: September 26, 1922 (aged 58) Scranton, Pennsylvania, U.S.
- Resting place: Forest Hill Cemetery
- Party: Republican
- Spouse: Lizabeth R. Shafer (m. 1889)
- Children: 2
- Parent: William Connell (father)

Charles Robert Connell (September 22, 1864 – September 26, 1922) was a Republican member of the U.S. House of Representatives from Pennsylvania, and the son of William Connell.

== Early life ==
Charles Robert Connell was born on September 22, 1864, in Scranton, Pennsylvania, to Annie (née Lawrence) and William Connell. His father was a U.S. congressman. Connell attended public schools and graduated from Williston Academy in Easthampton, Massachusetts, in 1884.

== Career ==
Connell engaged in mercantile pursuits with his father and engaged in banking. He was president of Lackawanna Mills. He was president and treasurer of the Scranton Button Company from 1888 until his death. He was vice president and director of the Third National Bank and director of the South Scranton Bank. He was also director of the Cherry River Boom and Lumber Company, the Richwood Store Company and the Cherry River Paper Company. He was a member of the board of trustees of Forest Hill Cemetery.

Connell was elected as a Republican to the 67th United States Congress in 1921, and served until his death.

== Personal life ==
Connell married Lizabeth R. Shafer, daughter of Ann and Charles Shafer, on September 26, 1889. They had two children, Gladys and Bernard L.

Connell died on September 26, 1922, at his home on Vine Street in Scranton. He was interred in Forest Hill Cemetery.

== See also ==
- List of members of the United States Congress who died in office (1900–1949)

U.S. House of Representatives
Preceded by John R. Farr	Member of the U.S. House of Representatives from Pennsylvania's 10th congressional district 1921–1922	Succeeded by William W. Griest
