= Thomas D. Nicholls =

American politician and labor unionist (1870–1931)

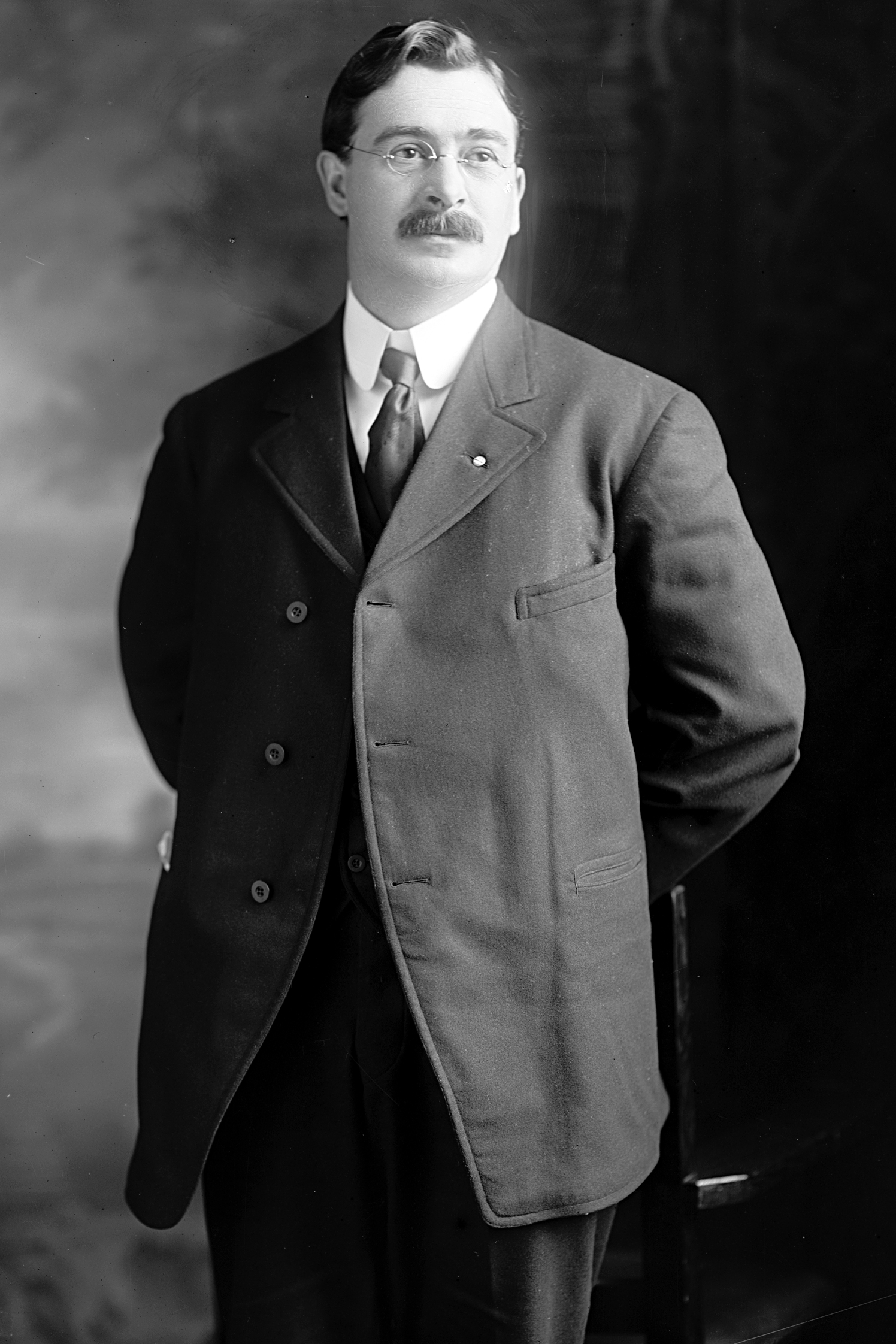

Member of the U.S. House of Representatives from Pennsylvania's 10th district
- In office March 4, 1907 – March 3, 1911
- Preceded by: Thomas H. Dale
- Succeeded by: John R. Farr

Personal details
- Born: Thomas David Nicholls; September 16, 1870 Wilkes-Barre, Pennsylvania, US
- Died: January 19, 1931 (aged 60) Princess Anne, Maryland, US
- Party: Independent Democrat
- Occupation: Politician, labor unionist

Thomas David Nicholls (September 16, 1870 – January 19, 1931) was an American politician and labor unionist. He was a member of the United States House of Representatives from Pennsylvania.

== Biography ==
Nicholls was born on September 16, 1870, in Wilkes-Barre, Pennsylvania, to Alfred Nicholls and Ann (née Davis) Nicholls. He grew up in Nanticoke, where he attended its public schools until age nine, afterwards attending night school during winter. From age eight or nine, he was a breaker boy and from age twelve he was a coal miner, among other mining jobs.

Nicholls learned foremanship via correspondence school, and in 1897, he received his foreman certification. He was later made a superintendent of mines. He was a member of the United Mine Workers of America and was elected President of its 1st District in 1899. As President, he negotiated in the Anthracite coal strike of 1902, as well as another strike in 1900. For a time, he simultaneously served as president and as a Congressman, but he resigned from as President in 1909, due to illness.

Politically, Nicholls was an Independent Democrat, though newspapers described him as "Democratic-Labor". While in the United Kingdom, he was nominated as a Democrat for Pennsylvania's 10th congressional district of the United States House of Representatives without his knowledge; he accepted the nomination. He won the election, serving from March 4, 1907 to March 3, 1911. He did not receive a nomination for the following election. There were attempts to nominate him to the United States Senate as a Republican, which Republican leaders objected to.

Endorsed by labor leader John Mitchell during his tenure, Nicholls fought for workers' and union rights in Congress. He was a member of the House Committee on Education and Workforce. He supported the Clayton Antitrust Act of 1914, which exempted unions from antitrust laws, and he proposed a bill which would have given postal workers more time off.

After serving in Congress, he became a poultry farmer near Princess Anne, Maryland, also in 1911. On February 26, 1896, he married Sarah Ann Hughes Nanticoke, and he had five children. He died on January 19, 1931, aged 60, in Princess Anne. He is buried in the Antioch Methodist Episcopal Cemetery, in Princess Anne.

U.S. House of Representatives
Preceded by Thomas Henry Dale	Member of the U.S. House of Representatives from Pennsylvania's 10th congressional district 1907–1911	Succeeded by John R. Farr
