= List of United States senators in the 57th Congress =

This is a complete list of United States senators during the 57th United States Congress listed by seniority from March 4, 1901, to March 3, 1903.

Order of service is based on the commencement of the senator's first term. Behind this is former service as a senator (only giving the senator seniority within their new incoming class), service as vice president, a House member, a cabinet secretary, or a governor of a state. The final factor is the population of the senator's state.

Senators who were sworn in during the middle of the Congress (up until the last senator who was not sworn in early after winning the November 1902 election) are listed at the end of the list with no number.

== Terms of service ==
Class	Terms of service of senators that expired in years
Class 3	Terms of service of senators that expired in 1903 (AL, AR, CA, CO, CT, FL, GA, IA, ID, IL, IN, KS, KY, LA, MD, MO, NC, ND, NH, NV, NY, OH, OK, OR, PA, SC, SD, UT, VT, WA, and WI.)
Class 1	Terms of service of senators that expired in 1905 (CA, CT, DE, FL, IN, MA, MD, ME, MI, MN, MO, MS, MT, ND, NE, NJ, NV, NY, OH, PA, RI, TN, TX, UT, VA, VT, WA, WI, WV, and WY.)
Class 2	Terms of service of senators that expired in 1907 (AL, AR, CO, DE, GA, IA, ID, IL, KS, KY, LA, MA, ME, MI, MN, MS, MT, NC, NE, NH, NJ, OK, OR, RI, SC, SD, TN, TX, VA, WV, and WY.)

== U.S. Senate seniority list ==
U.S. Senate seniority
Rank	Senator (party-state)	Seniority date	Other factors
1	William B. Allison (R-IA)	March 4, 1873	Former representative
2	John P. Jones (R-NV)	March 4, 1873	
3	Francis Cockrell (D-MO)	March 4, 1875	
4	George F. Hoar (R-MA)	March 4, 1877	Former representative
5	John Tyler Morgan (D-AL)	March 4, 1877	
6	George G. Vest (D-MO)	March 4, 1879	Missouri 5th in population (1870)
7	Orville H. Platt (R-CT)	March 4, 1879	Connecticut 25th in population (1870)
8	Eugene Hale (R-ME)	March 4, 1881	Former representative (10 years)
9	Joseph Hawley (R-CT)	March 4, 1881	Former representative (5 years)
10	William P. Frye (R-ME)	March 18, 1881	Former representative
11	Nelson Aldrich (R-RI)	October 5, 1881	Former representative
12	Shelby Moore Cullom (R-IL)	March 4, 1883	Former representative, Former governor
13	Henry M. Teller (D-CO)	March 4, 1885	Previously a senator
14	James K. Jones (D-AR)	March 4, 1885	
15	James H. Berry (D-AR)	March 20, 1885	Former governor
16	William M. Stewart (R-NV)	March 4, 1887	Previously a senator
17	John W. Daniel (D-VA)	March 4, 1887	Former representative
18	William B. Bate (D-TN)	March 4, 1887	Former governor
19	James McMillan (R-MI)	March 4, 1889	
20	Jacob H. Gallinger (R-NH)	March 4, 1891	Former representative (4 years)
21	Henry C. Hansbrough (R-ND)	March 4, 1891	Former representative (2 years)
22	James H. Kyle (R-SD)	March 4, 1891	
23	Redfield Proctor (R-VT)	November 2, 1891	Former governor
24	Henry Cabot Lodge (R-MA)	March 4, 1893	Former representative
25	George C. Perkins (R-CA)	July 26, 1893	Former governor
26	Julius C. Burrows (R-MI)	January 23, 1895	Former representative
27	Clarence D. Clark (R-WY)	January 24, 1895	
28	Jeter C. Pritchard (R-NC)	January 24, 1895	
29	William J. Sewell (R-NJ)	March 4, 1895	Previously a senator (6 years)
30	Francis E. Warren (R-WY)	March 4, 1895	Previously a senator (3 years)
31	Stephen Elkins (R-WV)	March 4, 1895	Former delegate, former cabinet member
32	Knute Nelson (R-MN)	March 4, 1895	Former governor, Minnesota 20th in population (1890)
33	Benjamin Tillman (D-SC)	March 4, 1895	Former governor, South Carolina 23rd in population (1890)
34	George P. Wetmore (R-RI)	March 4, 1895	Former governor, Rhode Island 36th in population (1890)
35	Augustus O. Bacon (D-GA)	March 4, 1895	Georgia 12th in population (1890)
36	Thomas S. Martin (D-VA)	March 4, 1895	Virginia 15th in population (1890)
37	John C. Spooner (R-WI)	March 4, 1897	Previously a senator (6 years)
38	Thomas C. Platt (R-NY)	March 4, 1897	Previously a senator (2 months)
39	William E. Mason (R-IL)	March 4, 1897	Former representative (4 years)
40	William A. Harris (PP-KS)	March 4, 1897	Former representative (2 years), Kansas 19th in population (1890)
41	George L. Wellington (R-MD)	March 4, 1897	Former representative (2 years), Maryland 27th in population (1890)
42	Joseph Rawlins (D-UT)	March 4, 1897	Former delegate
43	Joseph Foraker (R-OH)	March 4, 1897	Former governor, Ohio 4th in population (1890)
44	Samuel McEnery (D-LA)	March 4, 1897	Former governor, Louisiana 25th in population (1890)
45	Boies Penrose (R-PA)	March 4, 1897	Pennsylvania 2nd in population (1890)
46	Charles W. Fairbanks (R-IN)	March 4, 1897	Indiana 8th in population (1890)
47	William Deboe (R-KY)	March 4, 1897	Kentucky 11th in population (1890)
48	Alexander Clay (D-GA)	March 4, 1897	Georgia 12th in population (1890)
49	Edmund Pettus (D-AL)	March 4, 1897	Alabama 17th in population (1890)
50	George Turner (SR-WA)	March 4, 1897	Washington 34th in population (1890)
51	Henry Heitfeld (PP-ID)	March 4, 1897	Idaho 43rd in population (1890)
52	Mark Hanna (R-OH)	March 6, 1897	
53	Stephen Mallory (D-FL)	May 15, 1897	
54	John L. McLaurin (D-SC)	June 1, 1897	
55	Hernando Money (D-MS)	October 8, 1897	
56	Joseph Simon (R-OR)	October 8, 1898	
57	Louis McComas (R-MD)	March 4, 1899	Former representative (8 years)
58	John Kean (R-NJ)	March 4, 1899	Former representative (4 years)
59	Charles A. Culberson (D-TX)	March 4, 1899	Former governor
60	Chauncey Depew (R-NY)	March 4, 1899	New York 1st in population (1890)
61	Albert J. Beveridge (R-IN)	March 4, 1899	Indiana 8th in population (1890)
62	Joseph Quarles (R-WI)	March 4, 1899	Wisconsin 14th in population (1890)
63	Nathan B. Scott (R-WV)	March 4, 1899	West Virginia 28th in population (1890)
64	Addison Foster (R-WA)	March 4, 1899	Washington 34th in population (1890)
65	Porter McCumber (R-ND)	March 4, 1899	North Dakota 41st in population (1890)
66	James Taliaferro (D-FL)	April 20, 1899	
67	William V. Allen (PP-NE)	December 13, 1899	
68	Thomas R. Bard (R-CA)	February 7, 1900	
69	Jonathan P. Dolliver (R-IA)	August 22, 1900	Former representative
70	William P. Dillingham (R-VT)	October 18, 1900	
71	Matthew Quay (R-PA)	January 16, 1901	Previously a senator
72	Moses Clapp (R-MN)	January 23, 1901	Minnesota 20th in population (1890)
73	Thomas Kearns (R-UT)	January 23, 1901	Utah 40th in population (1890)
74	John H. Mitchell (R-OR)	March 4, 1901	Previously a senator (18 years)
75	Joseph C. S. Blackburn (D-KY)	March 4, 1901	Previously a senator (12 years)
76	Fred Dubois (D-ID)	March 4, 1901	Previously a senator (6 years)
77	William A. Clark (D-MT)	March 4, 1901	Previously a senator (1 year, 2 months)
78	Anselm J. McLaurin (D-MS)	March 4, 1901	Previously a senator (1 year, 1 month)
79	Joseph W. Bailey (D-TX)	March 4, 1901	Former representative (10 years)
80	Edward W. Carmack (D-TN)	March 4, 1901	Former representative (4 years), Tennessee 13th in population (1890)
81	Robert J. Gamble (R-SD)	March 4, 1901	Former representative (4 years), South Dakota 35th in population (1890)
82	Furnifold M. Simmons (D-NC)	March 4, 1901	Former representative (2 years), North Carolina 16th in population (1890)
83	Thomas Patterson (D-CO)	March 4, 1901	Former representative (2 years), Colorado 31st in population (1900)
84	Murphy J. Foster (D-LA)	March 4, 1901	Former governor
85	Joseph Burton (R-KS)	March 4, 1901	Kansas 19th in population (1890)
86	Henry E. Burnham (R-NH)	March 4, 1901	New Hampshire 33rd in population (1890)
87	Paris Gibson (D-MT)	March 7, 1901	
	Charles Dietrich (R-NE)	March 28, 1901	Former governor
88	Joseph Millard (R-NE)	March 28, 1901	
	Alfred B. Kittredge (R-SD)	July 1, 1901	
	John F. Dryden (R-NJ)	January 29, 1902	
	Russell A. Alger (R-MI)	September 27, 1902	
89	Heisler Ball (R-DE)	March 2, 1903	Former representative
90	Frank Allee (R-DE)	March 2, 1903	

== See also ==
- 57th United States Congress
- List of United States representatives in the 57th Congress
