= Thomas H. Dale =

American politician (1846–1912)

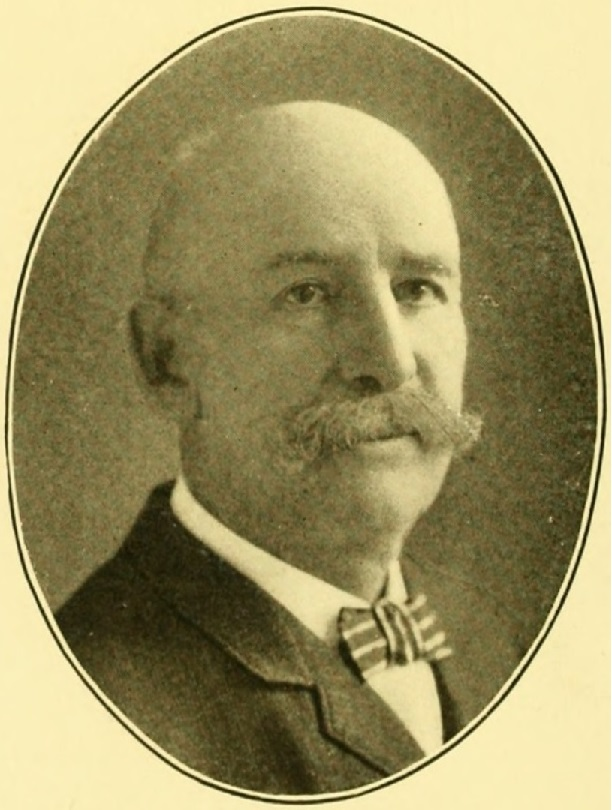
- Dale in a 1906 publication

Member of the U.S. House of Representatives from Pennsylvania's 10th district
- In office March 4, 1905 – March 3, 1907
- Preceded by: William Connell
- Succeeded by: Thomas D. Nicholls

Personal details
- Born: Thomas Henry Dale; June 12, 1846 Daleville, Pennsylvania, US
- Died: August 21, 1912 (aged 66) Daleville, Pennsylvania, US
- Party: Republican

Thomas Henry Dale (or Hanford; June 12, 1846 – August 21, 1912) was an American politician. He was a member of the United States House of Representatives from Pennsylvania.

== Biography ==
Dale was born on June 12, 1846, in Daleville, Pennsylvania, to William and Susan Dale. In 1863, he enlisted into the Union army and served in the American Civil War. First attending public schools in Putnam Township, he studied at the Wyoming Seminary for two years. Afterward he worked as an educator in New York for four years, then involved himself with business in Scranton; he operared a coal mine and meat market, and also helped found and, for some time, headed the Scranton Board of Trade.

A Republican, Dale was a delegate to the 1896 Republican National Convention. From 1882 to 1892, he was prothonotary of Lackawanna County. A candidate from Pennsylvania's 10th congressional district, he served in the United States House of Representatives, from March 4, 1905 to March 3, 1907. During his tenure, he championed reform legislation, such as his support for suffrage. For this, a newspaper compared him to President Theodore Roosevelt. He lost the 1906 election, prior to which he had been misregistered to being a candidate of the Prohibition Party, which was fixed.

After serving in Congress, Dale served as president of the Anthracite Trust Company in Scranton and was a trustee of the Albright Memorial Building. In 1870, he married Martha Grace Rounds, with whom he had two or three children. He died in on August 21, 1912, aged 66, in Daleville, from acute indigestion. He is buried in the Dunmore Cemetery, in Scranton.

U.S. House of Representatives
Preceded by William Connell	Member of the U.S. House of Representatives from Pennsylvania's 10th congressional district 1905–1907	Succeeded by Thomas D. Nicholls
