= William H. Sowden =

American politician

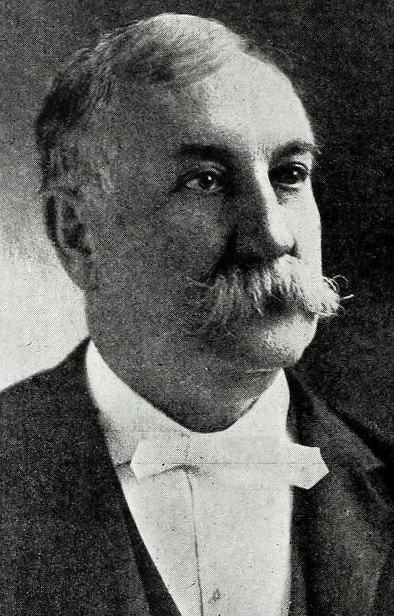
From Volume 3 of 1914's History of Lehigh County, Pennsylvania

William Henry Sowden (June 6, 1840 – March 3, 1907) was a Democratic member of the U.S. House of Representatives from Pennsylvania.

== Biography ==
William H. Sowden was born in Liskeard, Cornwall. He emigrated to the United States in 1846 with his father, who settled in Philadelphia, and later went to live with friends in Allentown, Pennsylvania. He attended the public schools and Allentown Academy.

During the American Civil War, he served as a corporal in Company D, One Hundred and Twenty-eighth Pennsylvania Volunteer Infantry, and served from August 13, 1862, to May 19, 1863. He studied law, was admitted to the bar in 1864, and after graduation from Harvard Law School in 1865 commenced practice in Allentown. He served as solicitor of Lehigh County, Pennsylvania, in 1868 and district attorney in 1872 through 1874. He was an unsuccessful candidate for Lieutenant Governor in 1874 and an unsuccessful candidate for election to Congress in 1876. He was a delegate to the 1884 Democratic National Convention, and served as city solicitor of Allentown in 1886.

Sowden was elected as a Democrat to the Forty-ninth and Fiftieth Congresses. He was not a candidate for reelection in 1888. He resumed the practice of law, and served as city solicitor of Allentown from 1900 to 1902. He was a delegate to the 1900 Democratic National Convention. He was an unsuccessful Republican candidate to the Fifty-ninth Congress in 1904. He was elected as solicitor of Lehigh County in 1906, and died in Allentown in 1907. Interment in Union Cemetery.

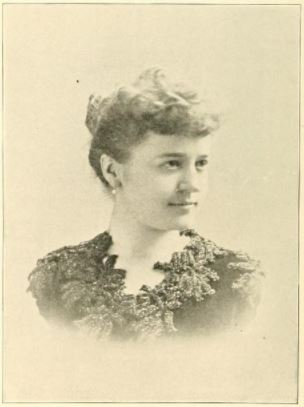
Mrs James L. Pugh, Jr.

In May 1888, his daughter married James L. Pugh, Jr, the son of U.S. senator from Alabama, James L. Pugh. Mrs James L. Pugh, Jr. was born in Allentown and studied at the Allentown Female College in 1884 and afterward attended the Luthervillw Female Seminary, near Baltimore.

Party political offices
Preceded by John S. Rilling	Democratic nominee for Lieutenant Governor of Pennsylvania; 1898	Succeeded by George W. Guthrie
U.S. House of Representatives
Preceded by William Mutchler	Member of the U.S. House of Representatives from Pennsylvania's 10th congressional district 1885–1889	Succeeded by Marriott Brosius
