= George Howell (Pennsylvania politician) =

American politician (1859–1913)

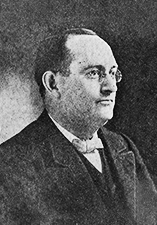

Member of the U.S. House of Representatives from Pennsylvania's 11th district
- In office March 4, 1903 – February 10, 1904
- Preceded by: Henry B. Cassel
- Succeeded by: William Connell

Personal details
- Born: June 28, 1859 Scranton, Pennsylvania
- Died: November 19, 1913 (aged 54) Scranton, Pennsylvania
- Party: Democratic

George Howell (June 28, 1859 – November 19, 1913) was an American lawyer, educator and politician who served for part of one term as a Democratic member of the U.S. House of Representatives from Pennsylvania in 1903 and 1904, when he was replaced in office after a successful challenge to his election.

== Biography ==
George Howell was born in Scranton, Pennsylvania. He attended the public schools, the Pennington Seminary in Pennington, New Jersey, the Newton Collegiate Institute in Newton, Pennsylvania, and Lafayette College in Easton, Pennsylvania. He graduated from the Illinois State Normal University at Normal.

He taught school fourteen years in Illinois, New Jersey, and Pennsylvania, and served seven years as superintendent of the public schools of Scranton.

He studied law, was admitted to the bar in 1904 and commenced practice in Scranton.

=== Congress ===
He presented credentials as a Democratic Member-elect to the Fifty-eighth Congress and served from March 4, 1903 to February 10, 1904, when he was succeeded by William Connell, who contested the election.

=== Later career and death ===
He was assistant principal of the Scranton Technical High School from 1906 to 1908, and served as superintendent of schools from 1908 until his death in Scranton. Interred in Forest Hill Cemetery.

== Sources ==
- United States Congress. "George Howell (id: H000862)". Biographical Directory of the United States Congress.
- The Political Graveyard

U.S. House of Representatives
Preceded by Henry B. Cassel	Member of the U.S. House of Representatives from Pennsylvania's 11th congressional district 1903–1904	Succeeded by William Connell
