= Marriott Brosius =

American politician

Marriott Henry Brosius
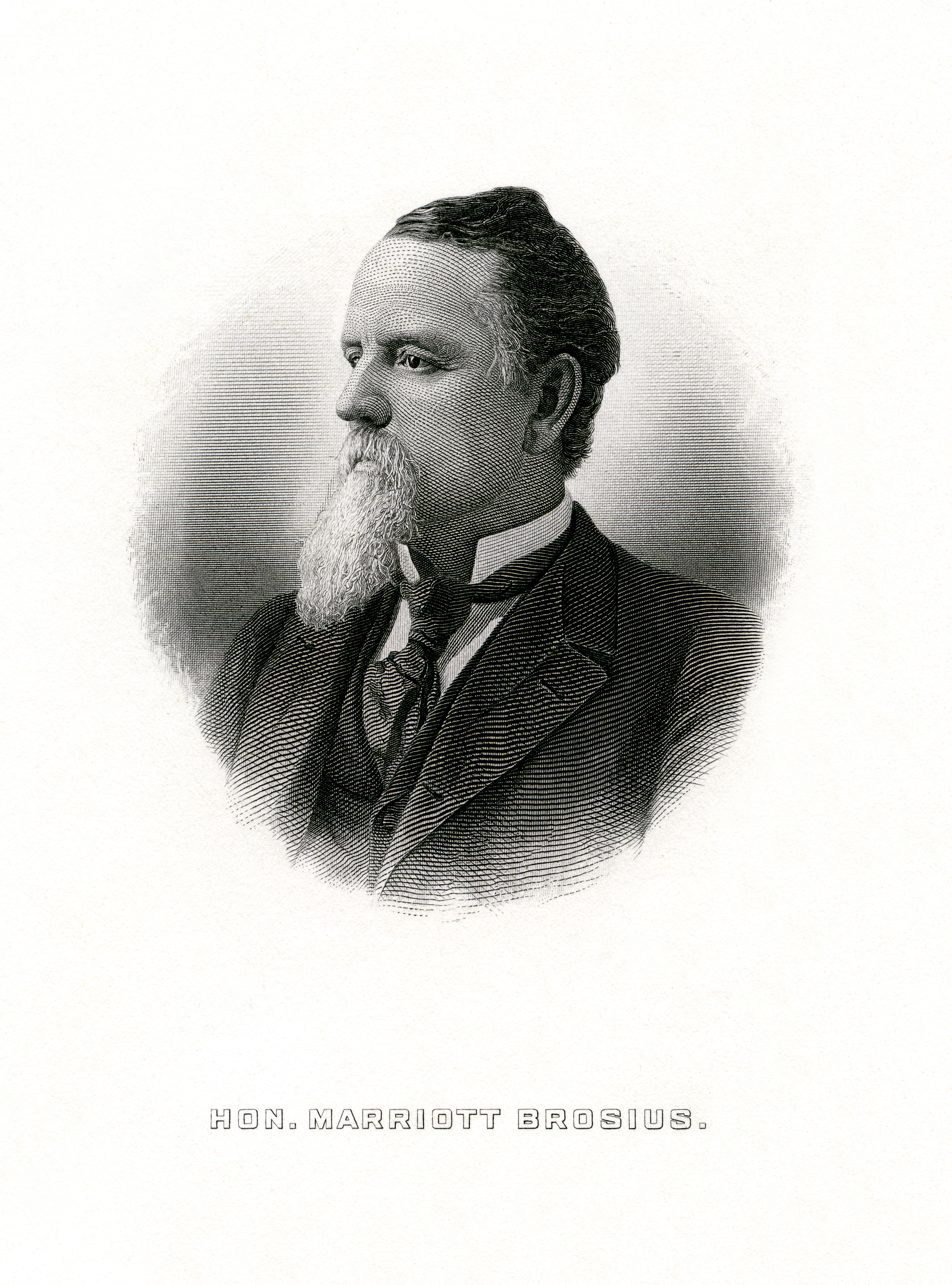

Member of the U.S. House of Representatives from Pennsylvania's 10th district
- In office March 4, 1889 – March 16, 1901
- Preceded by: William Henry Sowden
- Succeeded by: Henry B. Cassel

Personal details
- Born: March 7, 1843 Colerain Township, Lancaster County, Pennsylvania, U.S.
- Died: March 16, 1901 (aged 58) Lancaster, Pennsylvania, U.S.
- Party: Republican
- Education: University of Michigan Law School

Military service
- Allegiance: Union Army
- Branch/service: Union Army
- Years of service: 1861–1865
- Rank: Second lieutenant
- Unit: 97th Pennsylvania Infantry
- Battles/wars: American Civil War

Marriott Henry Brosius (March 7, 1843 – March 16, 1901) was a Republican member of the U.S. House of Representatives from Pennsylvania.

== Education and military service ==
Marriott Brosius was born in Colerain Township, Lancaster County, Pennsylvania, where he attended Thomas Baker's Academy. During the American Civil War, he enlisted as a private in Company K, Ninety-seventh Regiment, Pennsylvania Volunteers, in October 1861, for three years, and reenlisted May 1864. He was honorably discharged in December 1864. On February 28, 1865, was commissioned a second lieutenant for bravery on the field of battle. After the war he attended the State Normal School at Millersville, Pennsylvania, and the law department of the University of Michigan at Ann Arbor. He was admitted to the bar in 1868 and commenced practice in Lancaster, Pennsylvania.

== House of Representatives ==
Brosius was elected as a Republican to the 51st and to the six succeeding Congresses. He was chairman of the United States House Committee on Reform in the Civil Service during the 54th and 55th Congresses, and of the United States House Committee on Banking and Currency during the 56th Congress. He served until his death in Lancaster in 1901, aged 58. He is buried in Greenwood Cemetery.

== See also ==
- List of members of the United States Congress who died in office (1900–1949)

U.S. House of Representatives
Preceded by William H. Sowden	Member of the U.S. House of Representatives from Pennsylvania's 10th congressional district 1889–1901	Succeeded by Henry B. Cassel
