= William Connell (Pennsylvania politician) =

American politician (1827–1909)

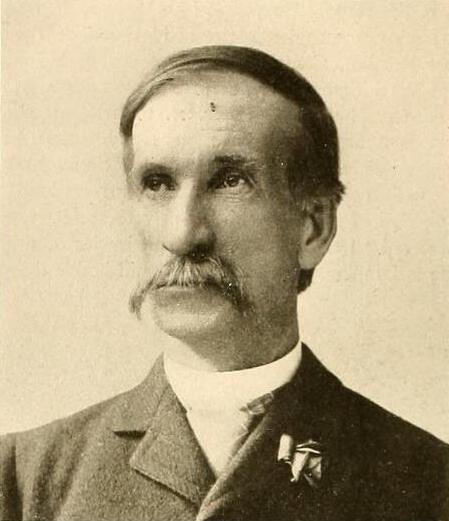
- Connell in a 1903 publication

Member of the U.S. House of Representatives from Pennsylvania's 10th district
- In office February 10, 1904 – March 3, 1905
- Preceded by: George Howell
- Succeeded by: Thomas Henry Dale

Member of the U.S. House of Representatives from Pennsylvania's 11th district
- In office March 4, 1897 – March 3, 1903
- Preceded by: Joseph A. Scranton
- Succeeded by: Henry Wilbur Palmer

Personal details
- Born: September 10, 1827 Sydney, Nova Scotia colony, British Canada
- Died: March 21, 1909 (aged 81) Scranton, Pennsylvania, U.S.
- Resting place: Forest Hill Cemetery
- Party: Republican
- Spouse: Annie Lawrence (died 1902)
- Children: 11, including Charles
- Profession: businessman

William Connell (September 10, 1827 – March 21, 1909) was a Republican member of the U.S. House of Representatives from Pennsylvania.

== Early life ==
William Connell was born on September 10, 1827, in Sydney in the colony of Nova Scotia colony, British Canada. His parents were of Scotch-Irish descent. In 1844, he moved with his parents to what is now Hazleton, Pennsylvania, where he worked in the coal mines as a driver boy. In 1856, he was promoted to superintendent over the Susquehanna and Wyoming Valley Railroad and Coal Company's National and Stafford mines in Minooka, with offices in Scranton.

== Career ==
In 1870, the Susquehanna and Wyoming Valley Railroad and Coal Company's charter with the State of Pennsylvania lapsed. He took advantage of this opportunity, purchasing that charter and the company's plant with his savings and organizing business under the firm of William Connell & Co.. Through this company, he became one of the largest independent coal operators in the Wyoming Valley region. In 1890, he organized and practically owned the Connell Coal Company, which he developed into a large and successful coal operating company. He later sold the Connell Coal Company to the Lehigh Valley Coal Company.

In 1872, he was one of the founders of the Third National Bank of Scranton. In 1879, he became its president. During his lifetime, he was also president of the Lackawanna Knitting Mills, Weston Mill Company, and Meadow Brook Land Company.

He was appointed sole arbitrator for the Lehigh Valley Railroad in settling claims arising from Mud Run disaster of October 10, 1888. He also acted as a mediator during attempted settlements of coal strikes, among other local industrial disputes.

In 1891, he founded the Scranton Tribune.

He was director of the Lackawanna Trust and Safe Deposit Company and the Scranton Button Company, once one of the largest manufacturers of buttons in the United States, which branched out into the manufacture of telephone parts and phonograph records.

=== U.S. State Representation ===
Connell was a member of the Pennsylvania Republican Committee and a delegate to the 1896, 1900 and 1908 Republican National Conventions.

For four successive terms, he was a Republican member of the United States House of Representatives for Pennsylvania. He was elected as U.S. Representative for Pennsylvania to the Fifty-fifth, Fifty-sixth, Fifty-seventh, and Fifty-eighth Congresses.

For his first three terms, from March 4, 1897 to March 3, 1903, he represented the 11th District of Pennsylvania.

In his last term, he successfully contested the election of George Howell to the Fifty-eighth Congress and served from February 10, 1904 to March 3, 1905, representing the 10th District of Pennsylvania.

== Personal life ==
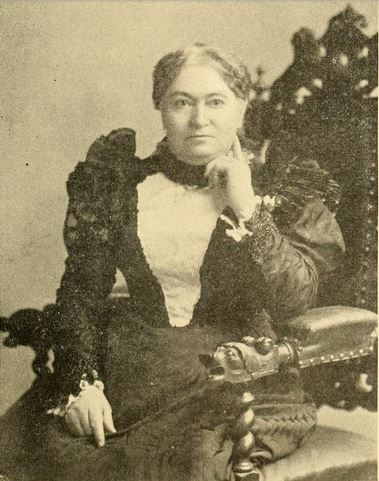
Mrs William Connell

Connell was one of the largest property owners in Scranton.

He was a member of the Methodist Episcopal Church.

Around 1851, Connell married Annie Lawrence. Together, they had 11 children, including Mrs. James S. McAnulty, Mrs. Charles W. Fulton, Charles Robert, Ezra H., Alfred E., Theodore E. and James L.

In 1902, his wife died.

Connell died on March 21, 1909, in Scranton. He was buried in Forest Hill Cemetery.

== Legacy ==
His summer estate, Lacawac, was listed on the National Register of Historic Places in 1979.

In 2017, Lackawanna Mills and Scranton Historic Button District was listed on the National Register of Historic Places due its historic, industrial significance. This block is the former location of the Lackawanna Knitting Mills and Weston Mill Company, over which he had presided, and the Scranton Button Company, which he had directed. companies which served as a basis for the district's historic, industrial significance.

The Connell Building, which he had built and owned for his business offices, was once the largest office building in Scranton. It has since been converted into apartment units.

Land he donated to the Scranton created Connell Park, a public recreation park in South Scranton. This nearly 16-acre park contains recreation facilities including a playground, pool, basketball court, athletic fields, walking path, BMX pump track and Scranton's first dog park.

U.S. House of Representatives
Preceded by Joseph A. Scranton	Member of the U.S. House of Representatives from Pennsylvania's 11th congressional district 1897–1903	Succeeded by Henry Wilbur Palmer
Preceded by George Howell	Member of the U.S. House of Representatives from Pennsylvania's 10th congressional district 1904–1905	Succeeded by Thomas Henry Dale
