= Henry B. Cassel =

American politician

Henry Cassel
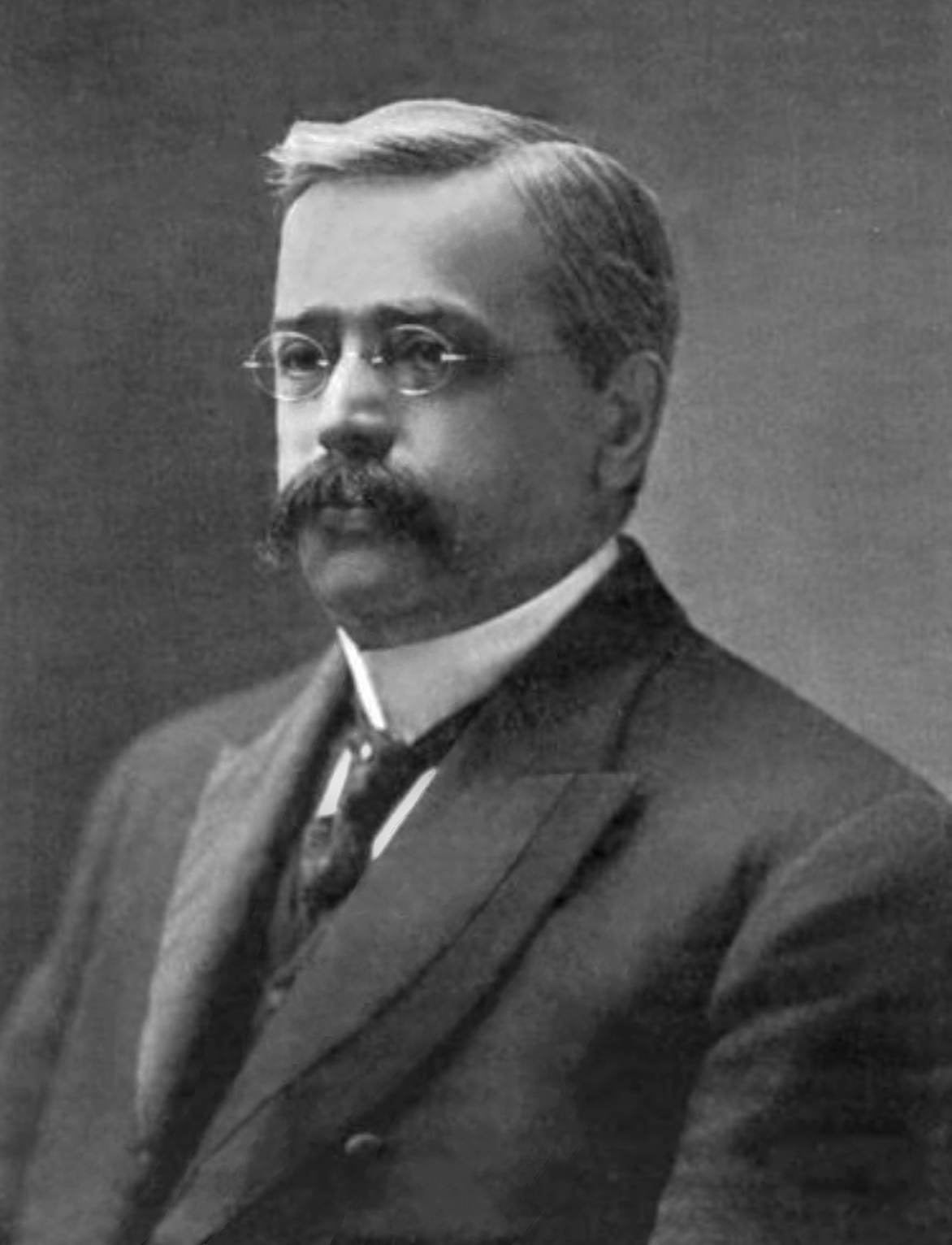

Member of the U.S. House of Representatives from Pennsylvania
- In office November 5, 1901 – March 3, 1909
- Preceded by: Marriott Brosius
- Succeeded by: William W. Griest
- Constituency: 10th district (1901–03); 9th district (1903–09)

Personal details
- Born: Henry Burd Cassel; October 19, 1855 Marietta, Pennsylvania, U.S.
- Died: April 28, 1926 (aged 70) Marietta, Pennsylvania, U.S.
- Party: Republican
- Education: Columbia Classical Institute

Henry Burd Cassel (October 19, 1855 – April 28, 1926) was a Republican member of the U.S. House of Representatives from Pennsylvania.

== History ==
Henry B. Cassel was born in Marietta, Pennsylvania, where he attended Columbia Classical Institute. Afterwards he was engaged in the wholesale and retail lumber business.

Cassel was a member of the Republican County Committee in 1881, and Chairman of the County Committee in 1893. He was chosen as a delegate to the 1896 Republican National Convention. Two years later, he served as a member of the Pennsylvania State House of Representatives in 1898 and 1900.

Cassel was elected as a Republican to the Fifty-seventh US Congress to fill the vacancy caused by the death of Representative Marriott Brosius. He was reelected to the Fifty-eighth, Fifty-ninth, and Sixtieth Congresses, serving as Chairman of the United States House Committee on Accounts during the Fifty-ninth Congress.

In 1909, Cassel was convicted of fraud related to the construction of the Pennsylvania State Capitol.

He returned to business as a manufacturer and contractor, and died in Marietta in 1926. Interment is in Marietta Cemetery.

== See also ==
- List of American federal politicians convicted of crimes
- List of federal political scandals in the United States

U.S. House of Representatives
Preceded by Marriott Brosius	Member of the U.S. House of Representatives from Pennsylvania's 10th congressional district 1901–1903	Succeeded by George Howell
Preceded by Henry D. Green	Member of the U.S. House of Representatives from Pennsylvania's 9th congressional district 1903–1909	Succeeded by William W. Griest
