= National Register of Historic Places listings in Brooks County, Georgia =

This is a list of properties and districts in Brooks County, Georgia that are listed on the National Register of Historic Places (NRHP).

This National Park Service list is complete through NPS recent listings posted September 26, 2025.

== Current listings ==
	Name on the Register	Image	Date listed	Location	City or town	Description
1	Bethlehem Primitive Baptist Church and Cemetery	Bethlehem Primitive Baptist Church and Cemetery	November 22, 2004 (#04001239)	County Rd. 125; 30°46′05″N 83°35′54″W	Quitman	Built in ca. 1861
2	Brooks County Courthouse	Brooks County Courthouse	September 18, 1980 (#80000976)	Screven St and Court Street; 30°47′08″N 83°33′37″W	Quitman	Built in 1859
3	Brooks County Jail	Brooks County Jail	August 26, 1982 (#82002387)	200 S. Madison St. 30°47′03″N 83°33′41″W	Quitman	Built in 1884
4	Cross Roads School		July 3, 2025 (#100011993)	40 Hodges Road; 30°50′10″N 83°39′57″W	Dixie	
5	Eudora Plantation	Eudora Plantation	December 16, 1974 (#74000662)	3.5 miles (5.6 km) south of Quitman off GA 33; 30°43′58″N 83°32′49″W	Quitman	Built ca. 1835–1855, destroyed by fire in 1987
6	Harris-Ramsey-Norris House	Harris-Ramsey-Norris House	September 5, 2008 (#08000832)	1004 W. Lafayette St. 30°47′12″N 83°34′06″W	Quitman	Built around 1870
7	Liberty Baptist Church	Liberty Baptist Church	August 20, 2013 (#13000609)	Liberty Church Rd. 30°43′20″N 83°43′41″W	Grooverville	Built ca. 1858
8	Quitman Historic District	Quitman Historic District	July 8, 1982 (#82002388)	US 84; 30°47′10″N 83°33′29″W	Quitman	
9	Henry Gray Turner House and Grounds	Henry Gray Turner House and Grounds	January 8, 1980 (#80000977)	802 Old Madison Rd. 30°46′43″N 83°32′57″W	Quitman	Built around 1895. The Quitman Garden Club is on the same grounds.
