= List of United States representatives in the 61st Congress =

This is a complete list of United States representatives during the 61st United States Congress listed by seniority.

As an historical article, the districts and party affiliations listed reflect those during the 61st Congress (March 4, 1909 – March 3, 1911). Seats and party affiliations on similar lists for other congresses will be different for certain members.

Seniority depends on the date on which members were sworn into office. Since many members are sworn in on the same day, subsequent ranking is based on previous congressional service of the individual and then by alphabetical order by the last name of the representative.

Committee chairmanship in the House is often associated with seniority. However, party leadership is typically not associated with seniority.

Note: The "*" indicates that the representative/delegate may have served one or more non-consecutive terms while in the House of Representatives of the United States Congress.

== U.S. House seniority list ==
U.S. House seniority
Rank	Representative	Party	District	Seniority date (Previous service, if any)	No.# of term(s)	Notes
1	Henry H. Bingham	R	PA-01	March 4, 1879	16th term	Dean of the House
2	John Dalzell	R	PA-30	March 4, 1887	12th term	
3	Sereno E. Payne	R	NY-31	December 2, 1889; Previous service, 1883–1887.	13th term*	
4	Leonidas F. Livingston	D	GA-05	March 4, 1891	10th term	Left the House in 1911.
5	David A. De Armond	D	MO-06	March 4, 1891	10th term	Died on November 23, 1909.
6	John A. T. Hull	R	IA-07	March 4, 1891	10th term	Left the House in 1911.
7	William Atkinson Jones	D	VA-01	March 4, 1891	10th term	
8	Richard Bartholdt	R	MO-10	March 4, 1893	9th term	
9	Joseph Gurney Cannon	R	IL-18	March 4, 1893; Previous service, 1873–1891.	18th term*	Speaker of the House
10	Henry Allen Cooper	R	WI-01	March 4, 1893	9th term	
11	John J. Gardner	R	NJ-02	March 4, 1893	9th term	
12	Frederick H. Gillett	R	MA-02	March 4, 1893	9th term	
13	Henry C. Loudenslager	R	NJ-01	March 4, 1893	9th term	
14	Samuel W. McCall	R	MA-08	March 4, 1893	9th term	
15	James Albertus Tawney	R	MN-01	March 4, 1893	9th term	Left the House in 1911.
16	Irving Price Wanger	R	PA-07	March 4, 1893	9th term	Left the House in 1911.
17	Charles Lafayette Bartlett	D	GA-06	March 4, 1895	8th term	
18	George Edmund Foss	R	IL-10	March 4, 1895	8th term	
19	Charles N. Fowler	R	NJ-05	March 4, 1895	8th term	Left the House in 1911.
20	Joseph V. Graff	R	IL-16	March 4, 1895	8th term	Left the House in 1911.
21	E. Stevens Henry	R	CT-01	March 4, 1895	8th term	
22	Ebenezer J. Hill	R	CT-04	March 4, 1895	8th term	
23	Benjamin Franklin Howell	R	NJ-03	March 4, 1895	8th term	Left the House in 1911.
24	Richard W. Parker	R	NJ-07	March 4, 1895	8th term	Left the House in 1911.
25	Stephen M. Sparkman	D	FL-01	March 4, 1895	8th term	
26	Nehemiah D. Sperry	R	CT-02	March 4, 1895	8th term	Left the House in 1911.
27	Cyrus A. Sulloway	R	NH-01	March 4, 1895	8th term	
28	William Sulzer	D	NY-10	March 4, 1895	8th term	
29	George W. Prince	R	IL-15	December 2, 1895	8th term	
30	William C. Adamson	D	GA-04	March 4, 1897	7th term	
31	De Alva S. Alexander	R	NY-36	March 4, 1897	7th term	Left the House in 1911.
32	William Gordon Brantley	D	GA-11	March 4, 1897	7th term	
33	Robert F. Broussard	D	LA-03	March 4, 1897	7th term	
34	Walter Brownlow	R	TN-01	March 4, 1897	7th term	Died on July 8, 1910.
35	Thomas S. Butler	R	PA-08	March 4, 1897	7th term	
36	Adin B. Capron	R	RI-02	March 4, 1897	7th term	Left the House in 1911.
37	Champ Clark	D	MO-09	March 4, 1897; Previous service, 1893–1895.	8th term*	
38	Edgar D. Crumpacker	R	IN-10	March 4, 1897	7th term	
39	James H. Davidson	R	WI-08	March 4, 1897	7th term	
40	Henry De Lamar Clayton, Jr.	D	AL-03	March 4, 1897	7th term	
41	James M. Griggs	D	GA-02	March 4, 1897	7th term	Died on January 5, 1910.
42	Edward L. Hamilton	R	MI-04	March 4, 1897	7th term	
43	James Hay	D	VA-07	March 4, 1897	7th term	
44	Robert Lee Henry	D	TX-11	March 4, 1897	7th term	
45	William Marcellus Howard	D	GA-08	March 4, 1897	7th term	Left the House in 1911.
46	John Lamb	D	VA-03	March 4, 1897	7th term	
47	William C. Lovering	R	MA-14	March 4, 1897	7th term	Died on February 4, 1910.
48	James R. Mann	R	IL-02	March 4, 1897	7th term	
49	John A. Moon	D	TN-03	March 4, 1897	7th term	
50	Sydney Emanuel Mudd I	R	MD-05	March 4, 1897; Previous service, 1890–1891.	8th term*	Left the House in 1911.
51	Marlin Edgar Olmsted	R	PA-18	March 4, 1897	7th term	
52	Thetus W. Sims	D	TN-08	March 4, 1897	7th term	
53	James Luther Slayden	D	TX-14	March 4, 1897	7th term	
54	Samuel William Smith	R	MI-06	March 4, 1897	7th term	
55	John Hall Stephens	D	TX-13	March 4, 1897	7th term	
56	Frederick Stevens	R	MN-04	March 4, 1897	7th term	
57	George W. Taylor	D	AL-01	March 4, 1897	7th term	
58	Oscar Underwood	D	AL-09	March 4, 1897; Previous service, 1895–1896.	8th term*	
59	James Tilghman Lloyd	D	MO-01	June 1, 1897	7th term	
60	Edwin C. Burleigh	R	ME-03	June 21, 1897	7th term	Left the House in 1911.
61	George P. Lawrence	R	MA-01	November 2, 1897	7th term	
62	Henry Sherman Boutell	R	IL-09	November 23, 1897	7th term	Left the House in 1911.
63	William S. Greene	R	MA-13	May 31, 1898	7th term	
64	Thomas Spight	D	MS-02	July 5, 1898	7th term	Left the House in 1911.
65	Albert S. Burleson	D	TX-10	March 4, 1899	6th term	
66	John L. Burnett	D	AL-07	March 4, 1899	6th term	
67	William A. Calderhead	R	KS-05	March 4, 1899; Previous service, 1895–1897.	7th term*	Left the House in 1911.
68	Francis W. Cushman	R	WA-02	March 4, 1899	6th term	Died on July 6, 1909.
69	Michael E. Driscoll	R	NY-29	March 4, 1899	6th term	
70	John J. Esch	R	WI-07	March 4, 1899	6th term	
71	David E. Finley	D	SC-05	March 4, 1899	6th term	
72	John J. Fitzgerald	D	NY-07	March 4, 1899	6th term	
73	Joseph W. Fordney	R	MI-08	March 4, 1899	6th term	
74	Washington Gardner	R	MI-03	March 4, 1899	6th term	Left the House in 1911.
75	Gilbert N. Haugen	R	IA-04	March 4, 1899	6th term	
76	James Monroe Miller	R	KS-04	March 4, 1899	6th term	Left the House in 1911.
77	Franklin Wheeler Mondell	R	WY	March 4, 1899; Previous service, 1895–1897.	7th term*	
78	James C. Needham	R	CA-06	March 4, 1899	6th term	
79	George Alexander Pearre	R	MD-06	March 4, 1899	6th term	Left the House in 1911.
80	William Augustus Reeder	R	KS-06	March 4, 1899	6th term	Left the House in 1911.
81	Ernest W. Roberts	R	MA-07	March 4, 1899	6th term	
82	William W. Rucker	D	MO-02	March 4, 1899	6th term	
83	Dorsey W. Shackleford	D	MO-08	March 4, 1899	6th term	
84	John Humphrey Small	D	NC-01	March 4, 1899	6th term	
85	Charles R. Thomas	D	NC-03	March 4, 1899	6th term	Left the House in 1911.
86	Joseph E. Ransdell	D	LA-05	August 29, 1899	6th term	
87	Amos L. Allen	R	ME-01	November 6, 1899	6th term	Died on February 20, 1911.
88	Edward B. Vreeland	R	NY-37	November 7, 1899	6th term	
89	William N. Richardson	D	AL-08	August 6, 1900	6th term	
90	Walter I. Smith	R	IA-09	December 3, 1900	6th term	
91	Arthur Laban Bates	R	PA-25	March 4, 1901	5th term	
92	George Farmer Burgess	D	TX-09	March 4, 1901	5th term	
93	Ezekiel S. Candler, Jr.	D	MS-01	March 4, 1901	5th term	
94	Frank Dunklee Currier	R	NH-02	March 4, 1901	5th term	
95	William Henry Draper	R	NY-22	March 4, 1901	5th term	
96	Henry D. Flood	D	VA-10	March 4, 1901	5th term	
97	David J. Foster	R	VT-01	March 4, 1901	5th term	
98	Joseph H. Gaines	R	WV-03	March 4, 1901	5th term	Left the House in 1911.
99	Henry M. Goldfogle	D	NY-09	March 4, 1901	5th term	
100	James A. Hughes	R	WV-05	March 4, 1901	5th term	
101	Joseph T. Johnson	D	SC-04	March 4, 1901	5th term	
102	Claude Kitchin	D	NC-02	March 4, 1901	5th term	
103	George H. Lindsay	D	NY-02	March 4, 1901	5th term	
104	Harry L. Maynard	D	VA-02	March 4, 1901	5th term	Left the House in 1911.
105	James McLachlan	R	CA-07	March 4, 1901; Previous service, 1895–1897.	6th term*	Left the House in 1911.
106	Lemuel P. Padgett	D	TN-07	March 4, 1901	5th term	
107	James Breck Perkins	R	NY-32	March 4, 1901	5th term	Died on March 11, 1910.
108	Edward W. Pou	D	NC-04	March 4, 1901	5th term	
109	Choice B. Randell	D	TX-04	March 4, 1901	5th term	
110	Charles C. Reid	D	AR-05	March 4, 1901	5th term	Left the House in 1911.
111	Charles Frederick Scott	R	KS-02	March 4, 1901	5th term	Left the House in 1911.
112	George N. Southwick	R	NY-23	March 4, 1901; Previous service, 1895–1899.	7th term*	Left the House in 1911.
113	Charles Q. Tirrell	R	MA-04	March 4, 1901	5th term	Died on July 31, 1910.
114	Charles L. Knapp	R	NY-28	November 5, 1901	5th term	Left the House in 1911.
115	Asbury Francis Lever	D	SC-07	November 5, 1901	5th term	
116	Augustus Peabody Gardner	R	MA-06	November 4, 1902	5th term	
117	Carter Glass	D	VA-06	November 4, 1902	5th term	
118	Gordon J. Russell	D	TX-03	November 4, 1902	5th term	Resigned on June 14, 1910.
119	John Wilbur Dwight	R	NY-30	November 4, 1902	5th term	
120	Morris Sheppard	D	TX-01	November 15, 1902	5th term	
121	Wyatt Aiken	D	SC-03	March 4, 1903	4th term	
122	Butler Ames	R	MA-05	March 4, 1903	4th term	
123	James Andrew Beall	D	TX-05	March 4, 1903	4th term	
124	Thomas W. Bradley	R	NY-20	March 4, 1903	4th term	
125	Eaton J. Bowers	D	MS-06	March 4, 1903	4th term	Left the House in 1911.
126	Adam M. Byrd	D	MS-05	March 4, 1903	4th term	Left the House in 1911.
127	Philip P. Campbell	R	KS-03	March 4, 1903	4th term	
128	Allen Foster Cooper	R	PA-23	March 4, 1903	4th term	Left the House in 1911.
129	Charles Russell Davis	R	MN-03	March 4, 1903	4th term	
130	Charles Eugene Fuller	R	IL-12	March 4, 1903	4th term	
131	John Nance Garner	D	TX-15	March 4, 1903	4th term	
132	Oscar W. Gillespie	D	TX-12	March 4, 1903	4th term	Left the House in 1911.
133	Herman P. Goebel	R	OH-02	March 4, 1903	4th term	Left the House in 1911.
134	Joseph A. Goulden	D	NY-18	March 4, 1903	4th term	Left the House in 1911.
135	Alexander W. Gregg	D	TX-07	March 4, 1903	4th term	
136	Thomas W. Hardwick	D	GA-10	March 4, 1903	4th term	
137	Edmund H. Hinshaw	R	NE-04	March 4, 1903	4th term	Left the House in 1911.
138	Joseph Howell	R	UT	March 4, 1903	4th term	
139	George Franklin Huff	R	PA-22	March 4, 1903; Previous service, 1891–1893 and 1895–1897.	6th term**	Left the House in 1911.
140	William E. Humphrey	D	WA-01	March 4, 1903	4th term	
141	Benjamin G. Humphreys II	D	MS-03	March 4, 1903	4th term	
142	Ollie Murray James	D	KY-01	March 4, 1903	4th term	
143	John A. Keliher	D	MA-09	March 4, 1903	4th term	Left the House in 1911.
144	James Kennedy	R	OH-18	March 4, 1903	4th term	Left the House in 1911.
145	Moses Kinkaid	R	NE-06	March 4, 1903	4th term	
146	Daniel F. Lafean	R	PA-20	March 4, 1903	4th term	
147	George Swinton Legaré	D	SC-01	March 4, 1903	4th term	
148	Nicholas Longworth	R	OH-01	March 4, 1903	4th term	
149	William Lorimer	R	IL-06	March 4, 1903; Previous service, 1895–1901.	7th term*	Resigned on June 17, 1909.
150	George A. Loud	R	MI-10	March 4, 1903	4th term	
151	Robert B. Macon	D	AR-01	March 4, 1903	4th term	
152	George Deardorff McCreary	R	PA-06	March 4, 1903	4th term	
153	Henry McMorran	R	MI-07	March 4, 1903	4th term	
154	Reuben Moon	R	PA-04	March 4, 1903	4th term	
155	George W. Norris	R	NE-05	March 4, 1903	4th term	
156	Robert N. Page	D	NC-07	March 4, 1903	4th term	
157	Arsène Pujo	D	LA-07	March 4, 1903	4th term	
158	Henry Thomas Rainey	D	IL-20	March 4, 1903	4th term	
159	Joseph Taylor Robinson	D	AR-06	March 4, 1903	4th term	
160	William A. Rodenberg	R	IL-22	March 4, 1903; Previous service, 1899–1901.	5th term*	
161	J. Swagar Sherley	D	KY-05	March 4, 1903	4th term	
162	William Robert Smith	D	TX-16	March 4, 1903	4th term	
163	Howard M. Snapp	R	IL-11	March 4, 1903	4th term	Left the House in 1911.
164	William H. Stafford	R	WI-05	March 4, 1903	4th term	Left the House in 1911.
165	Augustus Owsley Stanley	D	KY-02	March 4, 1903	4th term	
166	Halvor Steenerson	R	MN-09	March 4, 1903	4th term	
167	John Allen Sterling	R	IL-17	March 4, 1903	4th term	
168	Joshua Frederick Cockey Talbott	D	MD-02	March 4, 1903; Previous service, 1879–1885 and 1893–1895.	8th term**	
169	Charles E. Townsend	R	MI-02	March 4, 1903	4th term	Left the House in 1911.
170	Andrew Volstead	R	MN-07	March 4, 1903	4th term	
171	Robert M. Wallace	D	AR-07	March 4, 1903	4th term	Left the House in 1911.
172	Edwin Y. Webb	D	NC-09	March 4, 1903	4th term	
173	Charles H. Weisse	D	WI-06	March 4, 1903	4th term	Left the House in 1911.
174	William Warfield Wilson	R	IL-03	March 4, 1903	4th term	
175	Harry C. Woodyard	R	WV-04	March 4, 1903	4th term	Left the House in 1911.
176	H. Olin Young	R	MI-12	March 4, 1903	4th term	
177	Victor Murdock	R	KS-08	May 26, 1903	4th term	
178	James Thomas Heflin	D	AL-05	May 19, 1904	4th term	
179	Joseph R. Knowland	R	CA-03	November 8, 1904	4th term	
180	W. Aubrey Thomas	R	OH-19	November 8, 1904	4th term	Left the House in 1911.
181	Ira W. Wood	R	NJ-04	November 8, 1904	4th term	
182	John Emory Andrus	R	NY-19	March 4, 1905	3rd term	
183	Andrew Jackson Barchfeld	R	PA-32	March 4, 1905	3rd term	
184	Thomas Montgomery Bell	D	GA-09	March 4, 1905	3rd term	
185	Joseph B. Bennett	R	KY-09	March 4, 1905	3rd term	Left the House in 1911.
186	William Stiles Bennet	R	NY-17	March 4, 1905	3rd term	Left the House in 1911.
187	James F. Burke	R	PA-31	March 4, 1905	3rd term	
188	William M. Calder	R	NY-06	March 4, 1905	3rd term	
189	Pleasant T. Chapman	R	IL-24	March 4, 1905	3rd term	Left the House in 1911.
190	Frank Clark	D	FL-02	March 4, 1905	3rd term	
191	William W. Cocks	R	NY-01	March 4, 1905	3rd term	Left the House in 1911.
192	Ralph D. Cole	R	OH-08	March 4, 1905	3rd term	Left the House in 1911.
193	Albert F. Dawson	R	IA-02	March 4, 1905	3rd term	Left the House in 1911.
194	Edwin Denby	R	MI-01	March 4, 1905	3rd term	Left the House in 1911.
195	Lincoln Dixon	D	IN-04	March 4, 1905	3rd term	
196	Don C. Edwards	R	KY-11	March 4, 1905	3rd term	Left the House in 1911.
197	J. Edwin Ellerbe	D	SC-06	March 4, 1905	3rd term	
198	Jacob Sloat Fassett	R	NY-33	March 4, 1905	3rd term	Left the House in 1911.
199	John C. Floyd	D	AR-03	March 4, 1905	3rd term	
200	Finis J. Garrett	D	TN-09	March 4, 1905	3rd term	
201	John Gill, Jr.	D	MD-04	March 4, 1905	3rd term	Left the House in 1911.
202	William Harrison Graham	R	PA-29	March 4, 1905; Previous service, 1898–1903.	6th term*	Left the House in 1911.
203	Asle Gronna	R	ND	March 4, 1905	3rd term	Resigned on February 11, 1911.
204	L. B. Hanna	R	ND	March 4, 1905	3rd term	
205	Everis A. Hayes	R	CA-05	March 4, 1905	3rd term	
206	William C. Houston	D	TN-05	March 4, 1905	3rd term	
207	Elbert H. Hubbard	R	IA-11	March 4, 1905	3rd term	
208	Julius Kahn	R	CA-04	March 4, 1905; Previous service, 1899–1903.	5th term*	
209	J. Warren Keifer	R	OH-07	March 4, 1905; Previous service, 1877–1885.	6th term*	Left the House in 1911.
210	Charles B. Law	R	NY-04	March 4, 1905	3rd term	Left the House in 1911.
211	Gordon Lee	D	GA-07	March 4, 1905	3rd term	
212	Martin B. Madden	R	IL-01	March 4, 1905	3rd term	
213	Duncan E. McKinlay	R	CA-02	March 4, 1905	3rd term	Left the House in 1911.
214	William B. McKinley	R	IL-19	March 4, 1905	3rd term	
215	John M. Moore	D	TX-08	March 4, 1905	3rd term	
216	J. Van Vechten Olcott	R	NY-15	March 4, 1905	3rd term	Left the House in 1911.
217	Herbert Parsons	R	NY-13	March 4, 1905	3rd term	Left the House in 1911.
218	James O'H. Patterson	D	SC-02	March 4, 1905	3rd term	Left the House in 1911.
219	John Merriman Reynolds	R	PA-19	March 4, 1905	3rd term	Resigned on January 16, 1911.
220	Joseph L. Rhinock	D	KY-06	March 4, 1905	3rd term	Left the House in 1911.
221	Sylvester C. Smith	R	CA-08	March 4, 1905	3rd term	
222	Edward L. Taylor, Jr.	R	OH-12	March 4, 1905	3rd term	
223	John T. Watkins	D	LA-04	March 4, 1905	3rd term	
224	John W. Weeks	R	MA-12	March 4, 1905	3rd term	
225	Edwin W. Higgins	R	CT-03	October 2, 1905	3rd term	
226	James McKinney	R	IL-14	November 7, 1905	3rd term	
227	Harry M. Coudrey	R	MO-12	June 23, 1906	3rd term	Left the House in 1911.
228	John M. Nelson	R	WI-02	September 4, 1906	3rd term	
229	William F. Englebright	R	CA-01	November 6, 1906	3rd term	Left the House in 1911.
230	Frank Orren Lowden	R	IL-13	November 6, 1906	3rd term	Left the House in 1911.
231	J. Hampton Moore	R	PA-03	November 6, 1906	3rd term	
232	Daniel J. Riordan	D	NY-08	November 6, 1906; Previous service, 1899–1901.	4th term*	
233	Edward W. Saunders	D	VA-05	November 6, 1906	3rd term	
234	Charles G. Washburn	R	MA-03	December 18, 1906	3rd term	Left the House in 1911.
235	John A. M. Adair	D	IN-08	March 4, 1907	2nd term	
236	Joshua W. Alexander	D	MO-03	March 4, 1907	2nd term	
237	Timothy T. Ansberry	D	OH-05	March 4, 1907	2nd term	
238	William A. Ashbrook	D	OH-17	March 4, 1907	2nd term	
239	Charles Frederick Barclay	R	PA-21	March 4, 1907	2nd term	Left the House in 1911.
240	George A. Bartlett	D	NV	March 4, 1907	2nd term	Left the House in 1911.
241	Charles F. Booher	D	MO-04	March 4, 1907; Previous service, 1889.	3rd term*	
242	William J. Cary	R	WI-04	March 4, 1907	2nd term	
243	William E. Cox	D	IN-03	March 4, 1907	2nd term	
244	William Benjamin Craig	D	AL-04	March 4, 1907	2nd term	Left the House in 1911.
245	William B. Cravens	D	AR-04	March 4, 1907	2nd term	
246	Matthew Denver	D	OH-06	March 4, 1907	2nd term	
247	Albert Douglas	R	OH-11	March 4, 1907	2nd term	Left the House in 1911.
248	Cyrus Durey	R	NY-25	March 4, 1907	2nd term	Left the House in 1911.
249	Charles Gordon Edwards	D	GA-01	March 4, 1907	2nd term	
250	William R. Ellis	R	OR-02	March 4, 1907; Previous service, 1893–1899.	5th term*	Left the House in 1911.
251	George Winthrop Fairchild	R	NY-24	March 4, 1907	2nd term	
252	Benjamin K. Focht	R	PA-17	March 4, 1907	2nd term	
253	Charles V. Fornes	D	NY-11	March 4, 1907	2nd term	
254	Martin D. Foster	D	IL-23	March 4, 1907	2nd term	
255	William Walker Foulkrod	R	PA-05	March 4, 1907	2nd term	Died on November 13, 1910.
256	Hannibal Lafayette Godwin	D	NC-06	March 4, 1907	2nd term	
257	George W. Gordon	D	TN-10	March 4, 1907	2nd term	
258	Courtney W. Hamlin	D	MO-07	March 4, 1907; Previous service, 1903–1905.	3rd term*	
259	James A. Hamill	D	NJ-10	March 4, 1907	2nd term	
260	Winfield Scott Hammond	D	MN-02	March 4, 1907	2nd term	
261	Rufus Hardy	D	TX-06	March 4, 1907	2nd term	
262	Francis Burton Harrison	D	NY-16	March 4, 1907; Previous service, 1903–1905.	3rd term*	
263	Willis C. Hawley	R	OR-01	March 4, 1907	2nd term	
264	Harvey Helm	D	KY-08	March 4, 1907	2nd term	
265	Gilbert Hitchcock	D	NE-02	March 4, 1907; Previous service, 1903–1905.	3rd term*	Left the House in 1911.
266	Richmond P. Hobson	D	AL-06	March 4, 1907	2nd term	
267	L. Paul Howland	R	OH-20	March 4, 1907	2nd term	
268	William Pallister Hubbard	R	WV-01	March 4, 1907	2nd term	Left the House in 1911.
269	William Hughes	D	NJ-06	March 4, 1907; Previous service, 1903–1905.	3rd term*	
270	Cordell Hull	D	TN-04	March 4, 1907	2nd term	
271	Ben Johnson	D	KY-04	March 4, 1907	2nd term	
272	Charles A. Kennedy	R	IA-01	March 4, 1907	2nd term	
273	Gustav Küstermann	R	WI-09	March 4, 1907	2nd term	Left the House in 1911.
274	John W. Langley	R	KY-10	March 4, 1907	2nd term	
275	Francis R. Lassiter	D	VA-04	March 4, 1907; Previous service, 1900–1903.	4th term*	Died on October 31, 1909.
276	Charles August Lindbergh	R	MN-06	March 4, 1907	2nd term	
277	Edmond H. Madison	R	KS-07	March 4, 1907	2nd term	
278	George R. Malby	R	NY-26	March 4, 1907	2nd term	
279	James T. McDermott	D	IL-04	March 4, 1907	2nd term	
280	John Geiser McHenry	D	PA-16	March 4, 1907	2nd term	
281	James C. McLaughlin	R	MI-09	March 4, 1907	2nd term	
282	Elmer A. Morse	R	WI-10	March 4, 1907	2nd term	
283	Thomas David Nicholls	D	PA-10	March 4, 1907	2nd term	Left the House in 1911.
284	Frank Nye	R	MN-05	March 4, 1907	2nd term	
285	Joseph F. O'Connell	D	MA-10	March 4, 1907	2nd term	Left the House in 1911.
286	Andrew James Peters	D	MA-11	March 4, 1907	2nd term	
287	Charles Nelson Pray	R	MT	March 4, 1907	2nd term	
288	George W. Rauch	D	IN-11	March 4, 1907	2nd term	
289	John Hoover Rothermel	D	PA-13	March 4, 1907	2nd term	
290	Adolph J. Sabath	D	IL-05	March 4, 1907	2nd term	
291	Isaac R. Sherwood	D	OH-09	March 4, 1907; Previous service, 1873–1875.	3rd term*	
292	George Cookman Sturgiss	R	WV-02	March 4, 1907	2nd term	Left the House in 1911.
293	William E. Tou Velle	D	OH-04	March 4, 1907	2nd term	Left the House in 1911.
294	Nelson Platt Wheeler	R	PA-28	March 4, 1907	2nd term	Left the House in 1911.
295	William Willett, Jr.	D	NY-14	March 4, 1907	2nd term	Left the House in 1911.
296	William Bauchop Wilson	D	PA-15	March 4, 1907	2nd term	
297	Gerrit J. Diekema	R	MI-05	April 27, 1907	2nd term	Left the House in 1911.
298	Daniel Read Anthony, Jr.	R	KS-01	May 23, 1907	2nd term	
299	Charles Creighton Carlin	D	VA-08	November 5, 1907	2nd term	
300	Joel Cook	R	PA-02	November 5, 1907	2nd term	Died on December 15, 1910.
301	Charles D. Carter	D	OK-04	November 16, 1907	2nd term	
302	Scott Ferris	D	OK-05	November 16, 1907	2nd term	
303	Bird Segle McGuire	R	OK-01	November 16, 1907; Previous service, 1903–1907.	4th term*	
304	C. Bascom Slemp	R	VA-09	December 17, 1907	2nd term	
305	Napoleon B. Thistlewood	R	IL-25	February 15, 1908	2nd term	
306	Henry A. Barnhart	D	IN-13	November 3, 1908	2nd term	
307	Albert Estopinal	D	LA-01	November 3, 1908	2nd term	
308	Otto G. Foelker	R	NY-03	November 3, 1908	2nd term	Left the House in 1911.
309	Frank E. Guernsey	D	ME-04	November 3, 1908	2nd term	
310	Eben Martin	R	SD	November 3, 1908; Previous service, 1901–1907.	5th term*	
311	John P. Swasey	R	ME-02	November 3, 1908	2nd term	Left the House in 1911.
312	Carl C. Anderson	D	OH-13	March 4, 1909	1st term	
313	Richard W. Austin	R	TN-02	March 4, 1909	1st term	
314	William O. Barnard	R	IN-06	March 4, 1909	1st term	Left the House in 1911.
315	John W. Boehne	D	IN-01	March 4, 1909	1st term	
316	William Patterson Borland	D	MO-05	March 4, 1909	1st term	
317	Charles H. Burke	R	SD	March 4, 1909; Previous service, 1899–1907.	5th term*	
318	Joseph W. Byrns, Sr.	D	TN-06	March 4, 1909	1st term	
319	J. Campbell Cantrill	D	KY-07	March 4, 1909	1st term	
320	Cyrus Cline	D	IN-12	March 4, 1909	1st term	
321	James M. Cox	D	OH-03	March 4, 1909	1st term	
322	James Collier	D	MS-08	March 4, 1909	1st term	
323	Michael F. Conry	D	NY-12	March 4, 1909	1st term	
324	J. Harry Covington	D	MD-01	March 4, 1909	1st term	
325	Charles H. Cowles	R	NC-08	March 4, 1909	1st term	Left the House in 1911.
326	Charles E. Creager	R	OK-03	March 4, 1909	1st term	Left the House in 1911.
327	Charles A. Crow	R	MO-14	March 4, 1909	1st term	Left the House in 1911.
328	William A. Cullop	D	IN-02	March 4, 1909	1st term	
329	S. Hubert Dent, Jr.	D	AL-02	March 4, 1909	1st term	
330	William A. Dickson	D	MS-07	March 4, 1909	1st term	Left the House in 1911.
331	Martin Dies, Sr.	D	TX-02	March 4, 1909	1st term	
332	Francis H. Dodds	R	MI-11	March 4, 1909	1st term	
333	Daniel A. Driscoll	D	NY-35	March 4, 1909	1st term	
334	Politte Elvins	R	MO-13	March 4, 1909	1st term	Left the House in 1911.
335	Hamilton Fish II	R	NY-21	March 4, 1909	1st term	Left the House in 1911.
336	Thomas Gallagher	D	IL-08	March 4, 1909	1st term	
337	Alfred Buckwalter Garner	R	PA-12	March 4, 1909	1st term	Left the House in 1911.
338	Patrick F. Gill	D	MO-11	March 4, 1909	1st term	Left the House in 1911.
339	James William Good	R	IA-05	March 4, 1909	1st term	
340	James McMahon Graham	D	IL-21	March 4, 1909	1st term	
341	John Gaston Grant	R	NC-10	March 4, 1909	1st term	Left the House in 1911.
342	William Walton Griest	R	PA-09	March 4, 1909	1st term	
343	Thomas Ray Hamer	R	ID	March 4, 1909	1st term	Left the House in 1911.
344	William H. Heald	R	DE	March 4, 1909	1st term	
345	David Hollingsworth	R	OH-16	March 4, 1909	1st term	Left the House in 1911.
346	Dudley Mays Hughes	D	GA-03	March 4, 1909	1st term	
347	William Darius Jamieson	D	IA-08	March 4, 1909	1st term	Left the House in 1911.
348	Adna R. Johnson	R	OH-10	March 4, 1909	1st term	Left the House in 1911.
349	James Joyce	R	OH-15	March 4, 1909	1st term	Left the House in 1911.
350	Nathan E. Kendall	R	IA-06	March 4, 1909	1st term	
351	Eugene F. Kinkead	D	NJ-09	March 4, 1909	1st term	
352	Arthur W. Kopp	R	WI-03	March 4, 1909	1st term	
353	Charles A. Korbly	D	IN-07	March 4, 1909	1st term	
354	John Kronmiller	R	MD-03	March 4, 1909	1st term	Left the House in 1911.
355	J. N. Langham	R	PA-27	March 4, 1909	1st term	
356	James P. Latta	D	NE-03	March 4, 1909	1st term	
357	Irvine Lenroot	R	WI-11	March 4, 1909	1st term	
358	Frederick Lundin	R	IL-07	March 4, 1909	1st term	Left the House in 1911.
359	John A. Maguire	D	NE-01	March 4, 1909	1st term	
360	John Andrew Martin	D	CO-02	March 4, 1909	1st term	
361	Dannite H. Mays	D	FL-03	March 4, 1909	1st term	
362	Clarence B. Miller	R	MN-08	March 4, 1909	1st term	
363	Charles S. Millington	R	NY-27	March 4, 1909	1st term	Left the House in 1911.
364	Dick Thompson Morgan	R	OK-02	March 4, 1909	1st term	
365	John Motley Morehead II	R	NC-05	March 4, 1909	1st term	Left the House in 1911.
366	Charles Henry Morgan	R	MO-15	March 4, 1909; Previous service, 1875–1879, 1883–1885 and 1893–1895.	5th term***	Left the House in 1911.
367	Martin A. Morrison	D	IN-09	March 4, 1909	1st term	
368	Ralph W. Moss	D	IN-05	March 4, 1909	1st term	
369	Arthur P. Murphy	R	MO-16	March 4, 1909; Previous service, 1905–1907.	2nd term*	Left the House in 1911.
370	William Allan Oldfield	D	AR-02	March 4, 1909	1st term	
371	A. Mitchell Palmer	D	PA-26	March 4, 1909	1st term	
372	Henry Wilbur Palmer	R	PA-11	March 4, 1909; Previous service, 1901–1907.	4th term*	Left the House in 1911.
373	Charles E. Pickett	R	IA-03	March 4, 1909	1st term	
374	Frank Plumley	R	VT-02	March 4, 1909	1st term	
375	Charles Clarence Pratt	R	PA-14	March 4, 1909	1st term	Left the House in 1911.
376	Miles Poindexter	R	WA-03	March 4, 1909	1st term	Left the House in 1911.
377	Atterson W. Rucker	D	CO-01	March 4, 1909	1st term	
378	William Graves Sharp	D	OH-14	March 4, 1909	1st term	
379	William Paine Sheffield, Jr.	R	RI-01	March 4, 1909	1st term	Left the House in 1911.
380	James S. Simmons	R	NY-34	March 4, 1909	1st term	
381	Thomas U. Sisson	D	MS-04	March 4, 1909	1st term	
382	Edward T. Taylor	D	CO	March 4, 1909	1st term	
383	John K. Tener	R	PA-24	March 4, 1909	1st term	Resigned on January 16, 1911.
384	Robert Y. Thomas, Jr.	D	KY-03	March 4, 1909	1st term	
385	John Q. Tilson	R	CT	March 4, 1909	1st term	
386	Robert Charles Wickliffe	D	LA-06	March 4, 1909	1st term	
387	William H. Wiley	R	NJ-08	March 4, 1909; Previous service, 1903–1907.	3rd term*	Left the House in 1911.
388	Frank P. Woods	R	IA-10	March 4, 1909	1st term	
389	Richard Young	R	NY-05	March 4, 1909	1st term	Left the House in 1911.
	Samuel Louis Gilmore	D	LA-02	March 30, 1909	1st term	Died on July 18, 1910.
	James H. Cassidy	R	OH-21	April 20, 1909	1st term	Left the House in 1911.
	William Wallace McCredie	R	WA-02	November 2, 1909	1st term	Left the House in 1911.
	William Moxley	R	IL-06	November 23, 1909	1st term	Left the House in 1911.
	Clement C. Dickinson	D	MO-06	February 1, 1910	1st term	
	Seaborn Roddenbery	D	GA-02	February 6, 1910	1st term	
	Robert Turnbull	D	VA-04	March 8, 1910	1st term	
	Eugene Foss	D	MA-14	March 22, 1910	1st term	Resigned on January 4, 1911.
	James S. Havens	D	NY-32	April 19, 1910	1st term	Left the House in 1911.
	Robert M. Lively	D	TX-03	July 23, 1910	1st term	Left the House in 1911.
	H. Garland Dupré	D	LA-02	November 8, 1910	1st term	
	Zachary D. Massey	R	TN-01	November 8, 1910	1st term	Left the House in 1911.
	John Joseph Mitchell	D	MA-04	November 8, 1910	1st term	Left the House in 1911.

== Delegates ==
Rank	Delegate	Party	District	Seniority date (Previous service, if any)	No.# of term(s)	Notes
1	Jonah Kūhiō Kalanianaʻole	R	HI	March 4, 1903	4th term	
2	William Henry Andrews	R	NM	March 4, 1905	3rd term	
3	Tulio Larrínaga		PR	March 4, 1905	3rd term	
4	Benito Legarda		PHL	November 22, 1907	2nd term	
5	Pablo Ocampo		PHL	November 22, 1907	2nd term	
6	James Wickersham	R	AK	March 4, 1909	1st term	
7	Ralph H. Cameron	R	AZ	March 4, 1909	1st term	
8	Manuel Quezon		PHL	November 23, 1909	1st term	

== See also ==
- 61st United States Congress
- List of United States congressional districts
- List of United States senators in the 61st Congress
