= Harris-Ramsey-Norris House =

Historic house in Georgia, United States

- Harris--Ramsey--Norris House
- U.S. National Register of Historic Places
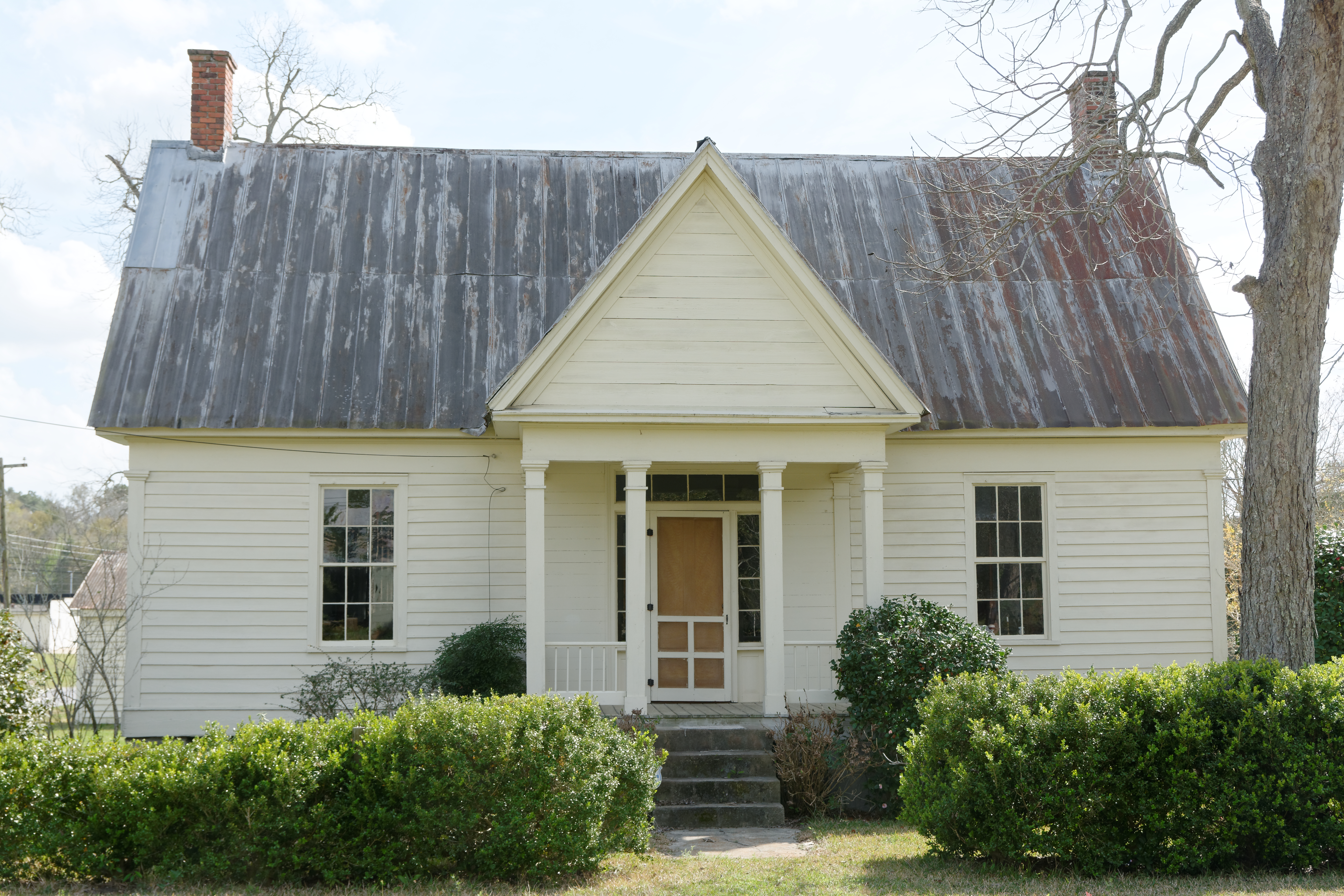
- The house in 2017

- Location within Georgia
- Location: 1004 W. Lafayette St., Quitman, Georgia
- Coordinates: 30.78667°N 83.56823°W
- Area: 0.1 acres (0.040 ha)
- Built: 1870; 156 years ago
- NRHP reference No.: 08000832
- Added to NRHP: September 5, 2008

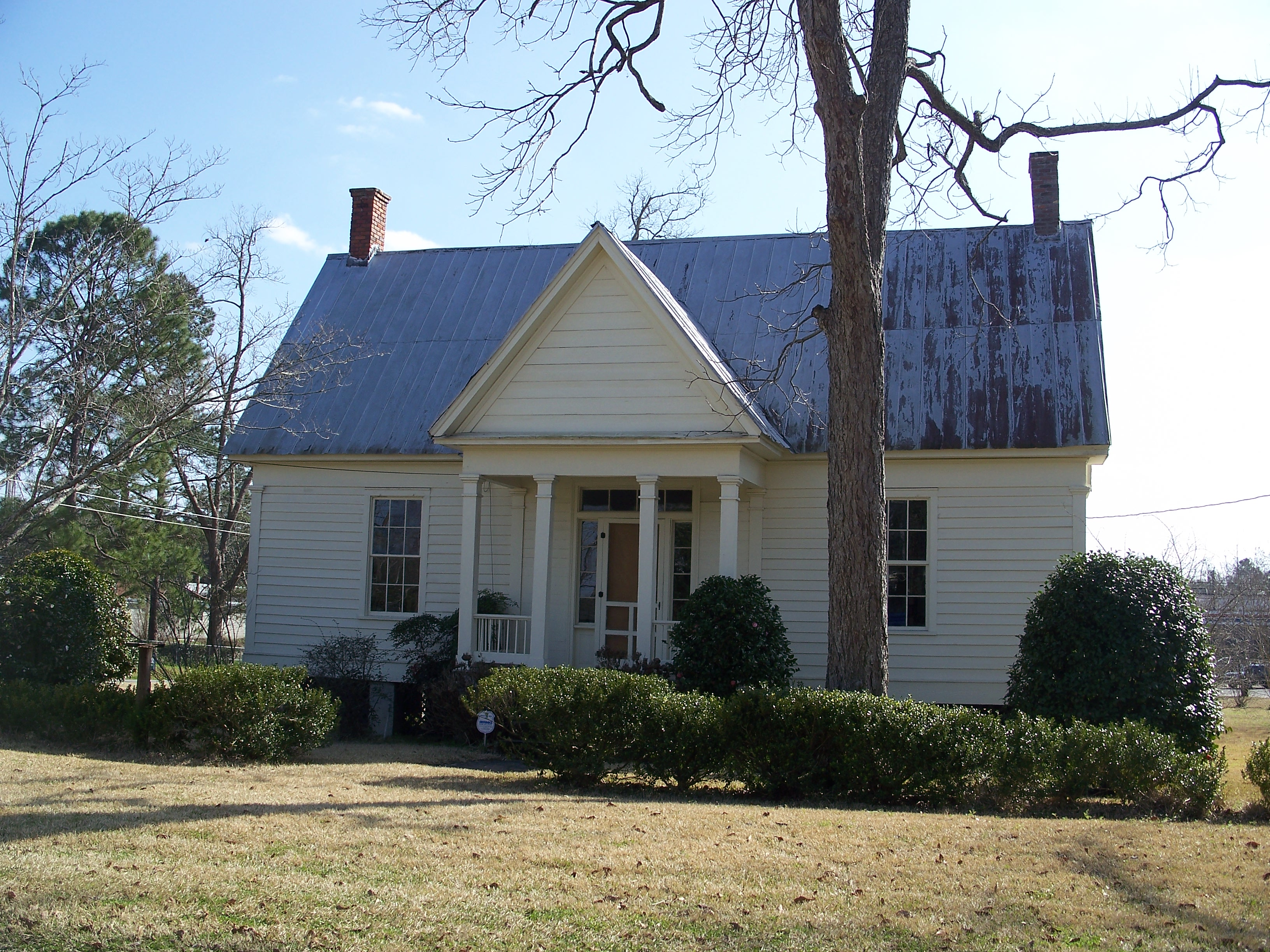
The house

The Harris-Ramsey-Norris House is a historic residence in Quitman, Georgia. It was added to the National Register of Historic Places on September 5, 2008. It was constructed in the second half of the 19th century. It is located at 1004 West Lafayette Street.

It was deemed significant "because it is an excellent and intact example of a central hallway cottage with rear ell."

== See also ==
- National Register of Historic Places listings in Brooks County, Georgia
- Quitman Historic District
