= Henry Gray Turner House =

Historic house in Georgia, United States

- Henry Gray Turner House and Grounds
- U.S. National Register of Historic Places
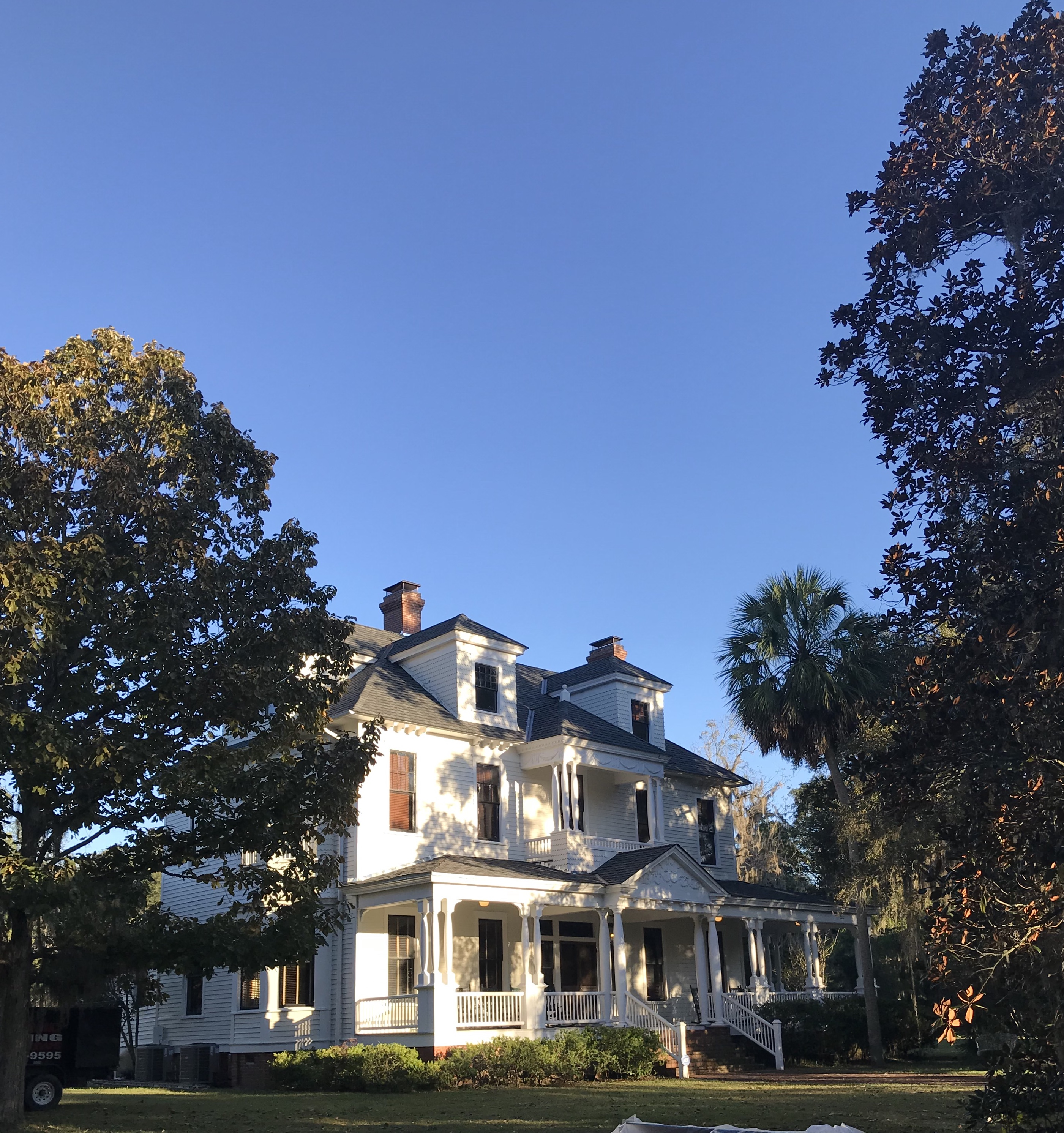
- The house and grounds

- Location within Georgia Location within the United States
- Location: 802 Old Madison Rd., Quitman, Georgia
- Coordinates: 30.77860°N 83.54918°W
- Area: 20.7 acres (8.4 ha)
- NRHP reference No.: 80000977
- Added to NRHP: January 8, 1980

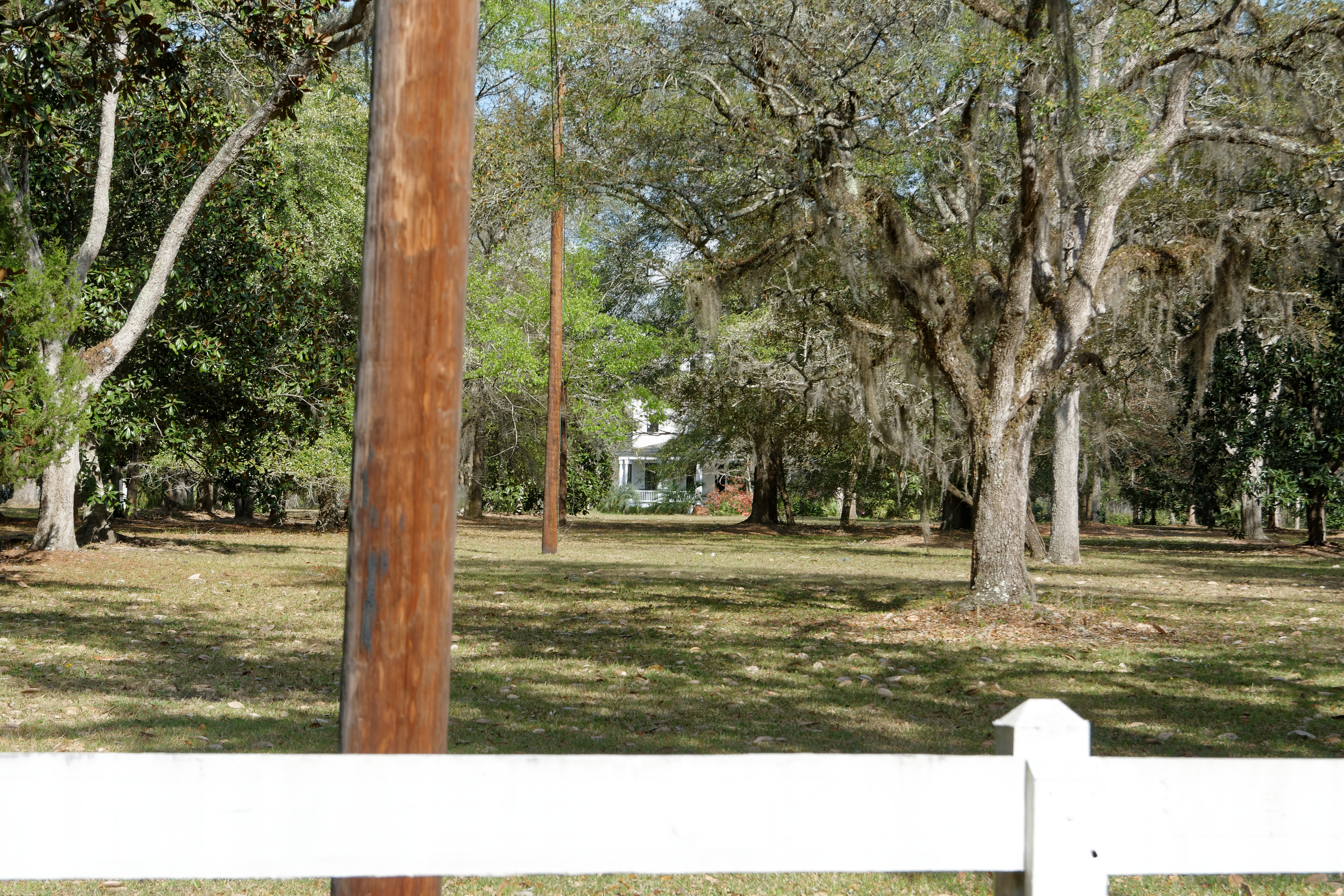
House and grounds

The Henry Gray Turner House, also known as Nocturne, is a historic site in Quitman, Georgia. The estate, including the house, outbuildings, and grounds, was added to the National Register of Historic Places on January 8, 1980. The property is located at 802 Old Madison Road. The home is associated with Henry G. Turner.

== Construction ==
The plans are marked with Munn & Co., an early patent law firm whose owner Orson Desaix Munn became the publisher of Scientific American. The hand-drawn original plans on vellum were found in the home's attic and are displayed in the house. The home was constructed by T.J. Darling of Waycross, Georgia.

It is a two-story house. Its grounds are also significant.

== See also ==
- National Register of Historic Places listings in Brooks County, Georgia
