= Henry G. Turner =

American judge

Henry Gray Turner
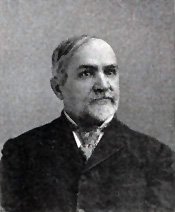

Member of the U.S. House of Representatives from Georgia
- In office March 4, 1881 – March 3, 1897
- Preceded by: William E. Smith (2nd); District established (11th)
- Succeeded by: Benjamin E. Russell (2nd); William G. Brantley (11th)
- Constituency: 2nd district (1881-93); 11th district (1893-97)

Member of the Georgia House of Representatives
- In office 1874-1876; 1878-1879

Personal details
- Born: March 20, 1839 Henderson, North Carolina, US
- Died: June 9, 1904 (aged 65) Raleigh, North Carolina, US
- Party: Democratic
- Spouse: Lavinia Calhoun Morton
- Education: University of Virginia
- Occupation: Attorney

Military service
- Allegiance: Confederate States
- Branch/service: Confederate States Army
- Rank: Captain
- Unit: 23rd North Carolina Infantry
- Battles/wars: American Civil War

Henry Gray Turner (March 20, 1839 – June 9, 1904) was an American politician, teacher, jurist and soldier. The Henry Gray Turner House in Quitman, Georgia is listed on the National Register of Historic Places.

== Biography ==
Turner was born near Henderson, North Carolina. He attended the University of Virginia (UVA) in Charlottesville in 1857 before moving to Brooks County, Georgia, in 1859 to teach school.

During the American Civil War, Turner enlisted as a private in the Confederate States Army and eventually rose to the rank of captain. At the Battle of Gettysburg in July 1863 he was struck in the left shoulder by a rifle ball and taken prisoner. After the war, he studied law, gained admittance to the state bar in 1865 and began practicing law in Quitman, Georgia. In 1874, Turner was elected to the Georgia House of Representatives in the State Assembly and served in that capacity until 1876. He also served as a delegate to the 1876 Democratic National Convention.

After two more terms in 1878 and 1879 in the state house, Turner was elected to the 47th United States Congress as a Democratic Representative. He was re-elected to Congress for seven additional terms until deciding not to run in 1896.

After his political service, Turner returned to his law practice in Quitman. In 1903, he was appointed as an associate justice of the Supreme Court of Georgia. Turner died the next year in Raleigh, North Carolina, and was buried in West End Cemetery in Quitman. Turner County, Georgia, is named in his honor.

== Fiction ==
Turner is the great-grandfather of a fictional character, Henry Gray Turner II, in a book by author Rob Morton, God, Forgive These Bastards. Morton's band, The Taxpayers, released a companion album to the book.

== Sources ==
- United States Congress. "Henry G. Turner (id: T000421)". Biographical Directory of the United States Congress. Retrieved on 2009-04-16

U.S. House of Representatives
Preceded by William Ephraim Smith	U.S. Representative for Georgia's 2nd congressional district March 4, 1881 – March 4, 1893	Succeeded by Benjamin E. Russell
Preceded by New seat	U.S. Representative for Georgia's 11th congressional district March 4, 1893 – March 3, 1897	Succeeded by William Gordon Brantley
