= Bethlehem Primitive Baptist Church and Cemetery =

Historic site in Brooks County, Georgia, US

- U.S. National Register of Historic Places
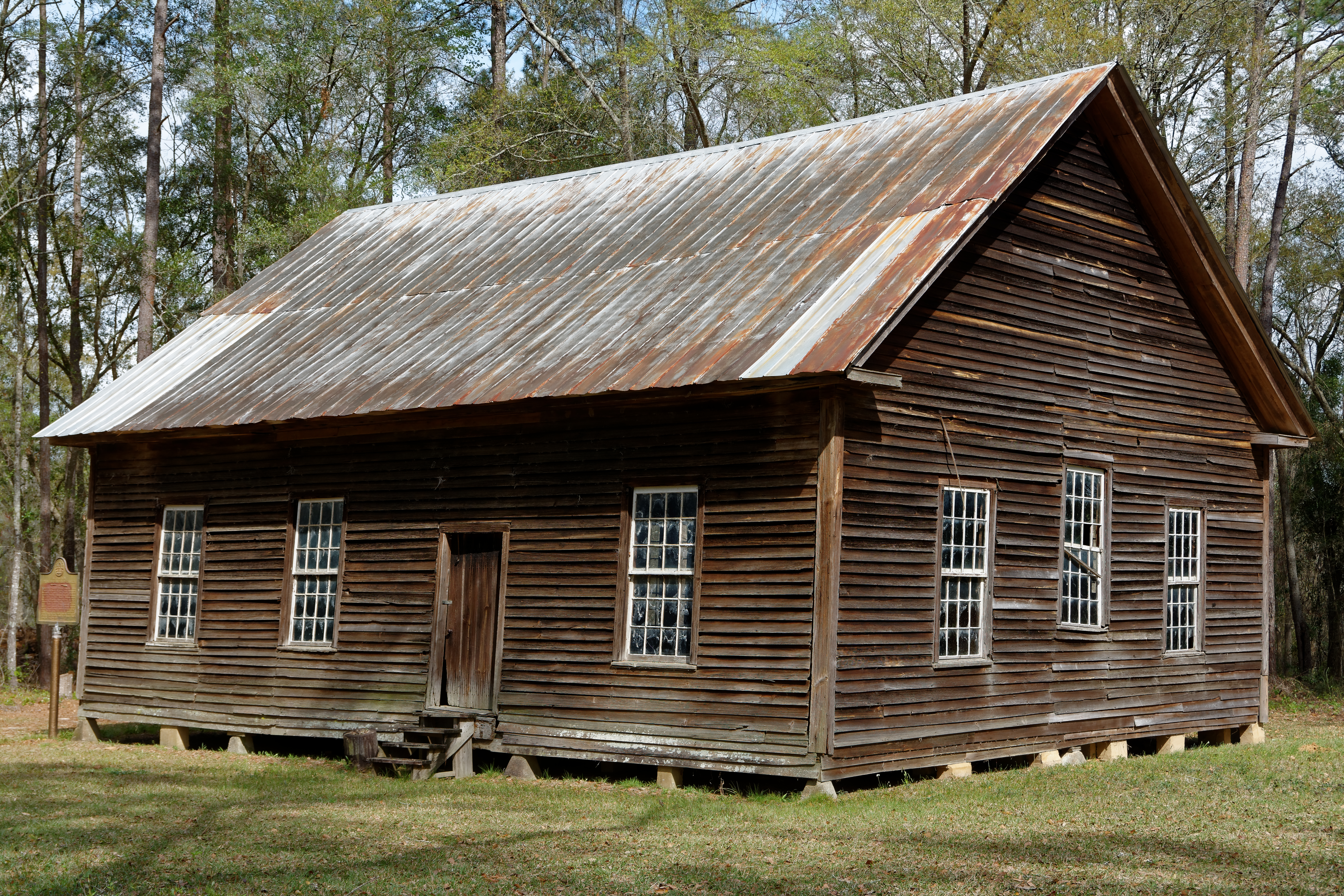
- The church in 2017

- Location within Georgia
- Nearest city: Quitman, Georgia
- Coordinates: 30.76796°N 83.59836°W
- Area: 5 acres (2.0 ha)
- NRHP reference No.: 04001239
- Added to NRHP: November 22, 2004

Bethlehem Primitive Baptist Church and Cemetery is a historic site in Quitman, Georgia. It was added to the National Register of Historic Places in 2004. The church congregation was organized in 1834 and the church building was built c. 1861 (165 years ago). It is located on County Road 125.

It was deemed notable as one of the last surviving antebellum buildings in rural Brooks County, and also "for its simple form, design, and craftsmanship, typical not only of rural churches but also of Primitive Baptist churches." It is notable also as very early example of a Primitive Baptist church, as the generally accepted date of the founding of the Primitive Baptist faith in the United States (in Black Rock, Maryland) is just two years earlier, in 1832. The church building was used by the congregation from c.1861 to 1965, and again from 1981 to 1984.

== See also ==
- National Register of Historic Places listings in Brooks County, Georgia
