= Grooverville Methodist Church =

Church in Georgia, United States

Coordinates: 30.7223°N 83.727°W

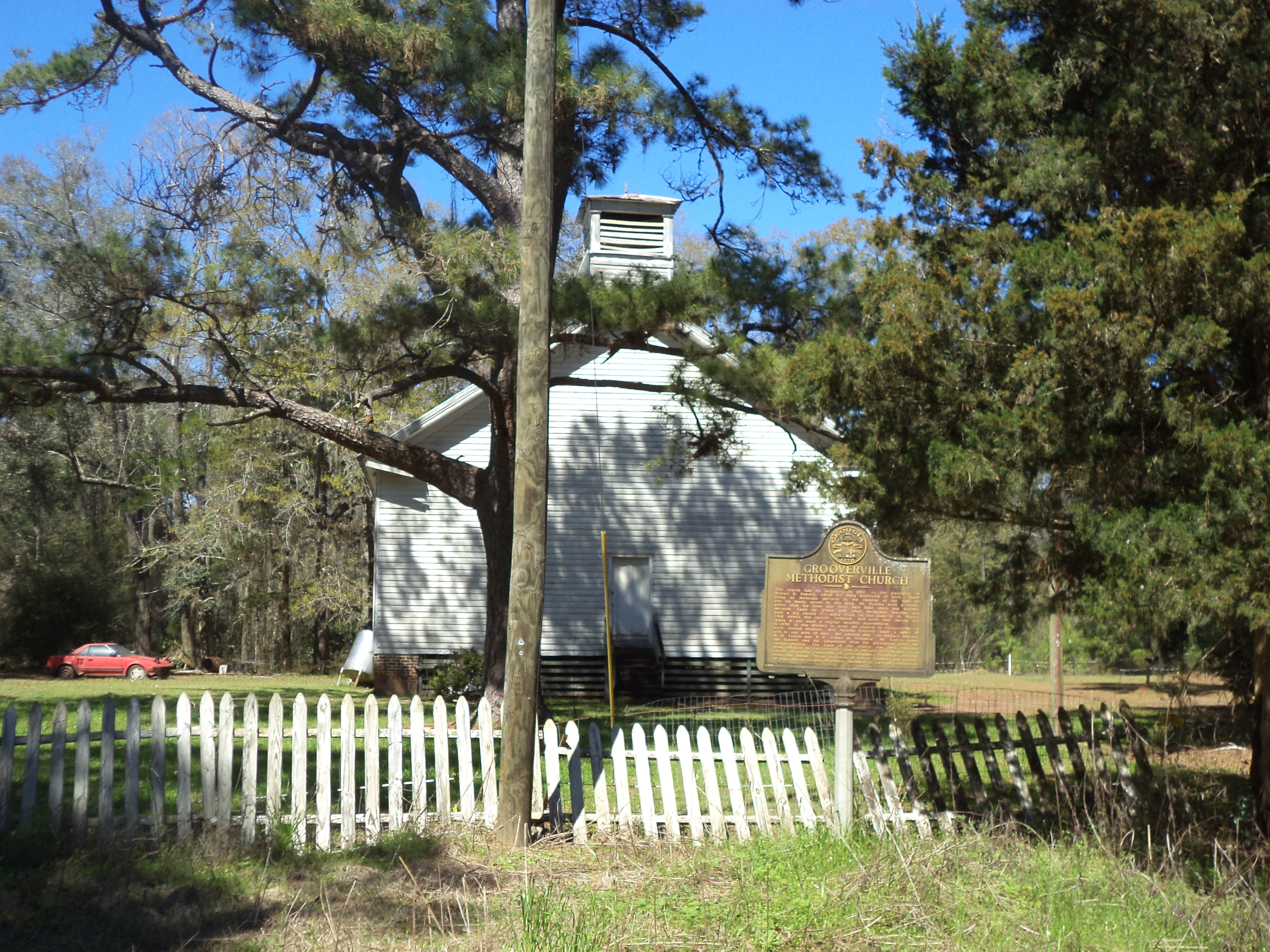
Grooverville Methodist Church

Grooverville Methodist Church is a historic church in Grooverville, Georgia. It was first established on the plantation of William H. Ramsey in 1832 (about 4 1/2 miles southwest of the church's present location). It became the largest church on a circuit that included Grooverville, Georgia; Prospect, Georgia; Beulah, Georgia and Hickory Head, Georgia. Ramsey had three grandsons who became Methodist ministers in Georgia conferences. It is now privately owned.

Before the existing church was constructed a brush arbor was used and then a log church was built on the road to St. Marks and the church was named Lebanon Church. The church's location was moved to Grooverville in 1856 when Malachi Groover deeded one acre of land to Richard Ramsey, M. W. Linton and W. R. Joiner as Trustees for construction of the church. Linton prepared the lumber and carpenters from his plantation constructed it. The name of the church was changed from Lebanon to Grooverville.

== See also ==
- Liberty Baptist Church (Grooverville, Georgia)
