= Nellie Weldon Cocroft =

American composer

- Born: Ellen Estelle Weldon; November 4, 1885; Quitman, Georgia, U.S.
- Died: June 27, 1986 (aged 100)
- Other names: N. Weldon Cocroft
- Occupation: Composer

Ellen Weldon Cocroft (November 4, 1885 – June 27, 1986) was an American musical composer.

== Early life ==
Ellen Estelle Weldon was born on November 4, 1885, in Quitman, Georgia, the daughter of Richard Weldon and Virginia (Massey) Weldon. She was the eldest of three daughters, including Jeanivieve (b. 1893) and Minnie (b. 1896). Her father, Richard, was a traveling salesman, although he also owned the Quitman Marble Company (since 1886). In early 1904, Richard moved his family and the company twenty miles west to nearby Thomasville, Georgia, where he renamed his company the Thomasville Marble Company; among their products were memorial headstones.

== Career ==
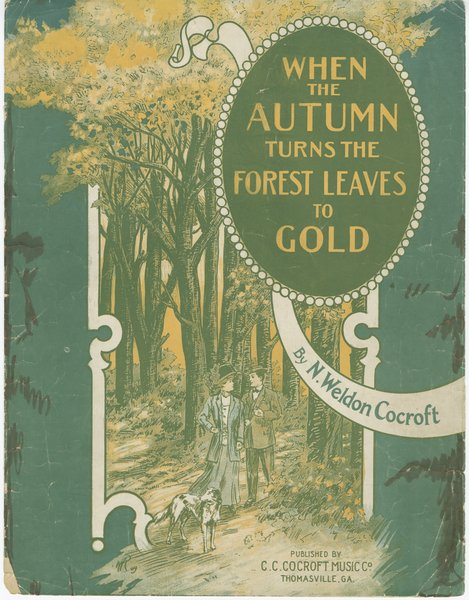
Sheet music for "When the Autumn Turns the Forest Leaves to Gold" (1909) by N. Weldon Cocroft

Nellie graduated with a degree in piano and organ performance in early 1905, at the age of 20, from Breneau College (now known as Brenau University). She married Christopher ("C.C.") Cocroft (also a musician) not long after, in April 1905.

Nellie Cocroft was a church organist and choir director in Thomasville. Her husband ran a music store, and published her compositions to sell in the shop under the name "N. Weldon Cocroft".

Published works by Nellie Weldon Cocroft included "When the Birds are Singing in the Springtime" (1909), "Pinywoods Rag" (1909), "When the Autumn Turns the Forest Leaves to Gold" (1909), "Georgia Cracker" (1909), and "I'se Gwine to Highball" (1910). No musical copyrights seem to have been filed by N. Weldon Cocroft after 1910.

After a lengthy divorce in 1923-1924, and upon losing custody of her son, she moved to Jacksonville, Florida, where she worked as a secretary in a law office until the late 1940s. Not much is known about her after this date.

== Later life and death ==
She died in June 1986, at the age of 100, in Jacksonville, Florida. She is buried in Thomasville, Georgia.

Her son, Charles Christopher CoCroft (1910-2001), continued the family's music publishing company until he sold the business in 2000.

Cocroft's "Georgia Cracker", performed by pianist Nora Hulse (d. 2020), was included in Hulse's 2002 compilation Ragtime refreshments: 25 rags by women composers. Music by Nellie Weldon Cocroft is played at the "Jazz & Swing Club" at the Georgia Music Hall of Fame.
