= John R. Walker =

American politician

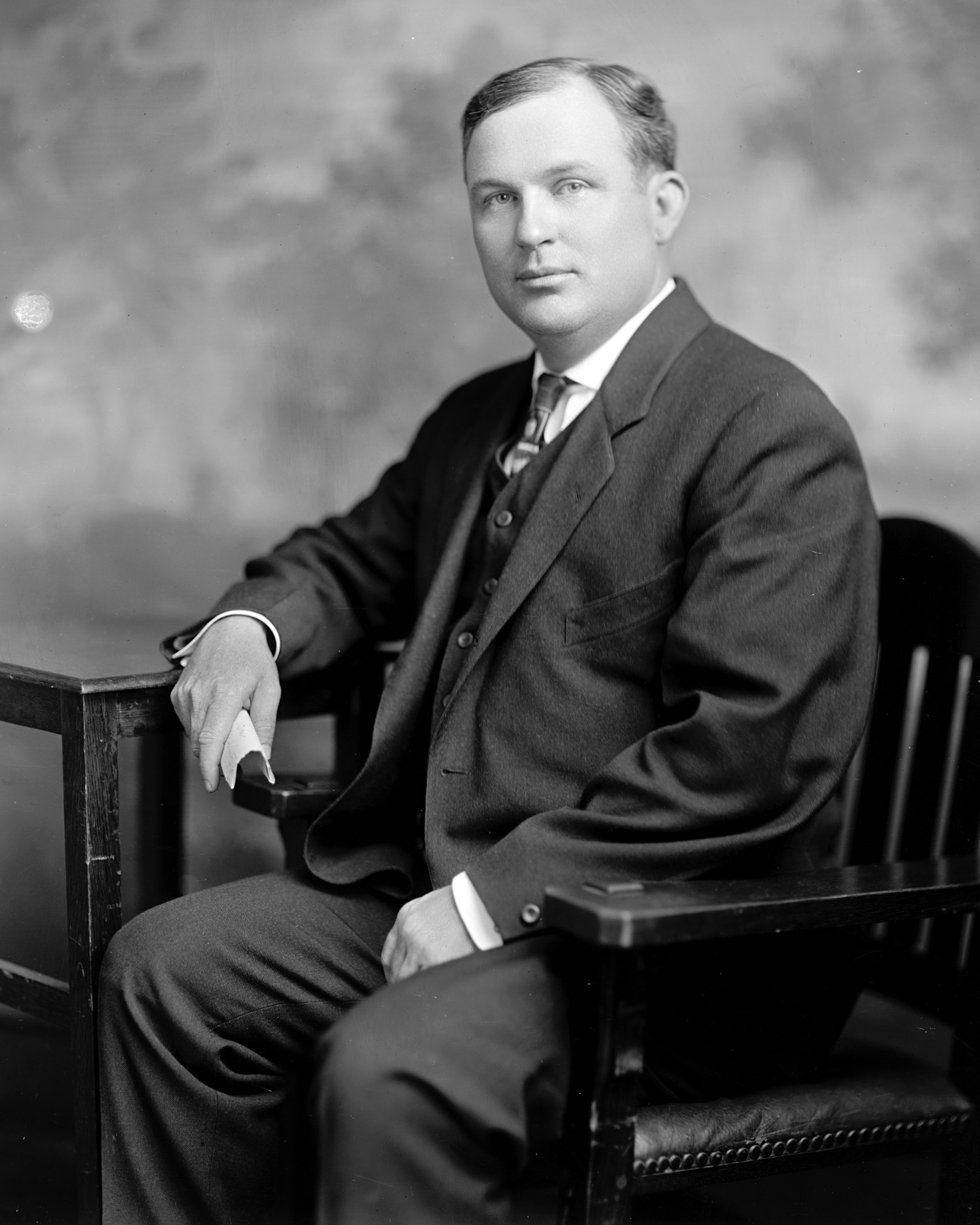

Member of the U.S. House of Representatives from Georgia's 11th district
- In office March 4, 1913 – March 3, 1919
- Preceded by: William Gordon Brantley
- Succeeded by: William Chester Lankford

Personal details
- Born: February 23, 1874 near Blackshear, Georgia
- Died: July 21, 1942 (aged 68) Blackshear, Georgia
- Party: Democratic
- Education: University of Georgia School of Law
- Occupation: lawyer

John Randall Walker (February 23, 1874 – July 21, 1942) was a U.S. political figure from the state of Georgia. Walker was born near Blackshear, Georgia in 1874 and graduated from the Jasper Normal College in Jasper, Florida. He then studied law at the University of Georgia School of Law and graduated with a Bachelor of Laws (LL.B.) degree in 1898.

In 1912, Walker was elected to the 63rd United States Congress as a Democratic member of the United States House of Representatives and served two additional terms in that seat until losing his bid for renomination in 1918. He died in Blackshear on July 21, 1942, and was buried in a family cemetery in Pierce County, Georgia.

U.S. House of Representatives
Preceded by William Gordon Brantley	Member of the U.S. House of Representatives from Georgia's 11th congressional district March 4, 1913 – March 3, 1919	Succeeded by William Chester Lankford
