= William C. Lankford =

American politician

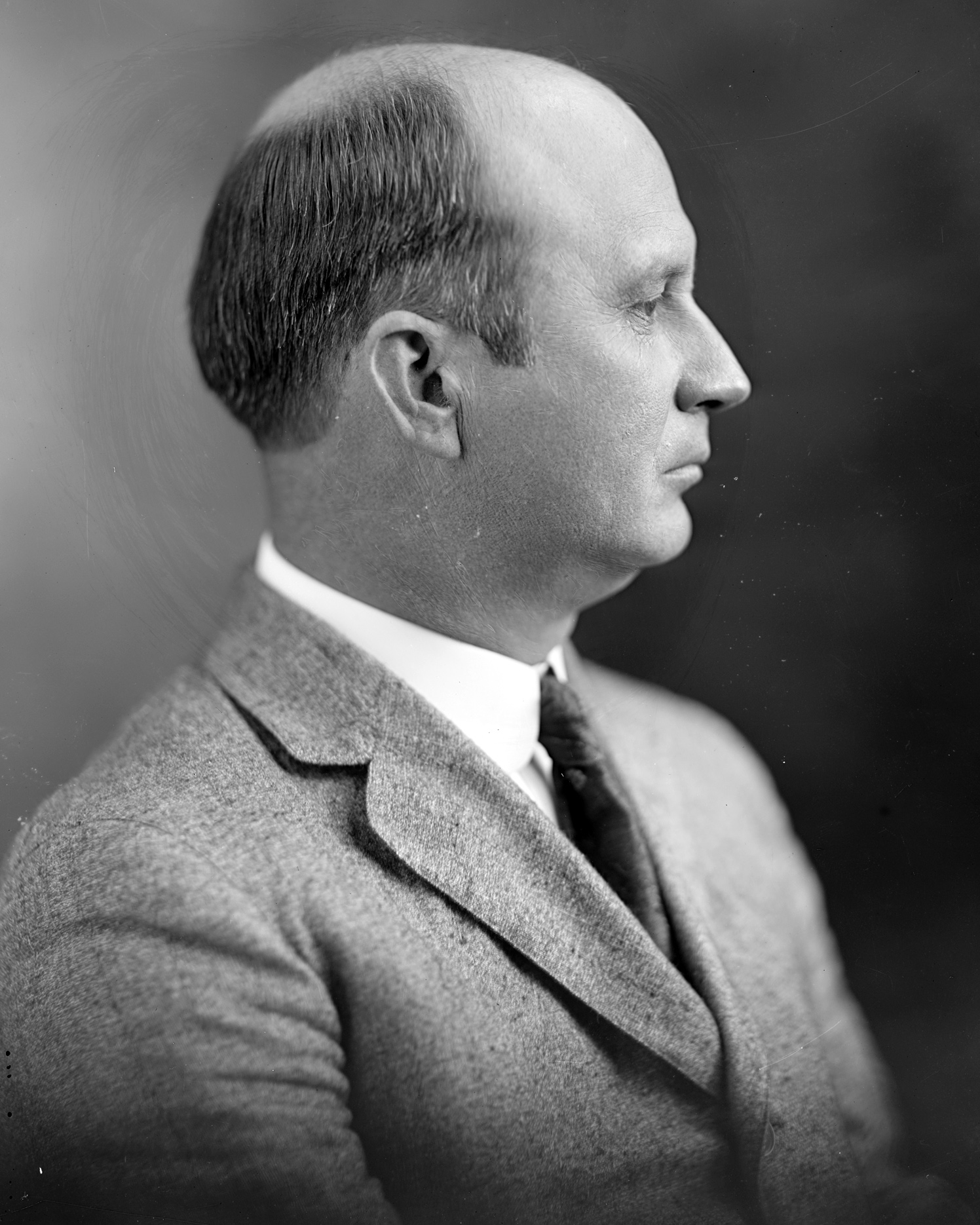

Member of the U.S. House of Representatives from Georgia's 11th district
- In office March 4, 1919 – March 3, 1933
- Preceded by: John Randall Walker
- Succeeded by: none (district abolished)

Personal details
- Born: December 7, 1877 Clinch County, Georgia
- Died: December 10, 1964 (aged 87) Twin Lakes, Georgia
- Party: Democratic
- Education: University of Georgia School of Law
- Occupation: Politician, judge, lawyer

William Chester Lankford (December 7, 1877 – December 10, 1964) was an American politician, judge and lawyer.

Lankford was born in the Camp Creek Community of Clinch County, Georgia in 1874 and graduated from the Jasper Normal Institute in Jasper, Florida, in 1897 and the Georgia Normal College and Business Institute in Abbeville, Georgia, in 1900. He then studied law at the University of Georgia School of Law and graduated with a Bachelor of Laws (LL.B.) degree in 1901.

After moving to Douglas, Georgia, in 1901, Lankford began the practice of law. In 1906, he was elected Mayor of Douglas and became a member of the city Board of Education the following year. He remained on the board until 1918. On January 1, 1908, Lankford became a judge of the city court. He resigned that post on May 1, 1916, to run an unsuccessful campaign that year for the United States House of Representatives. Lankford ran again for the 66th United States Congress in 1918 and was elected as a Democrat to represent Georgia's 11th congressional district. He won reelection to that seat six additional terms before losing in 1932.

Following his congressional service, Lankford returned to practicing law. He worked in the General Accounting Office in Washington, D.C. from January 1935 through October 1942. On December 10, 1964, he died in Twin Lakes, Georgia, and was buried in Douglas Cemetery in the city of Douglas.

U.S. House of Representatives
Preceded by John Randall Walker	Member of the U.S. House of Representatives from Georgia's 11th congressional district March 4, 1919 – March 3, 1933	Succeeded by District became defunct after United States congressional apportionment
