= Grooverville, Georgia =

Unincorporated community in Georgia, U.S.

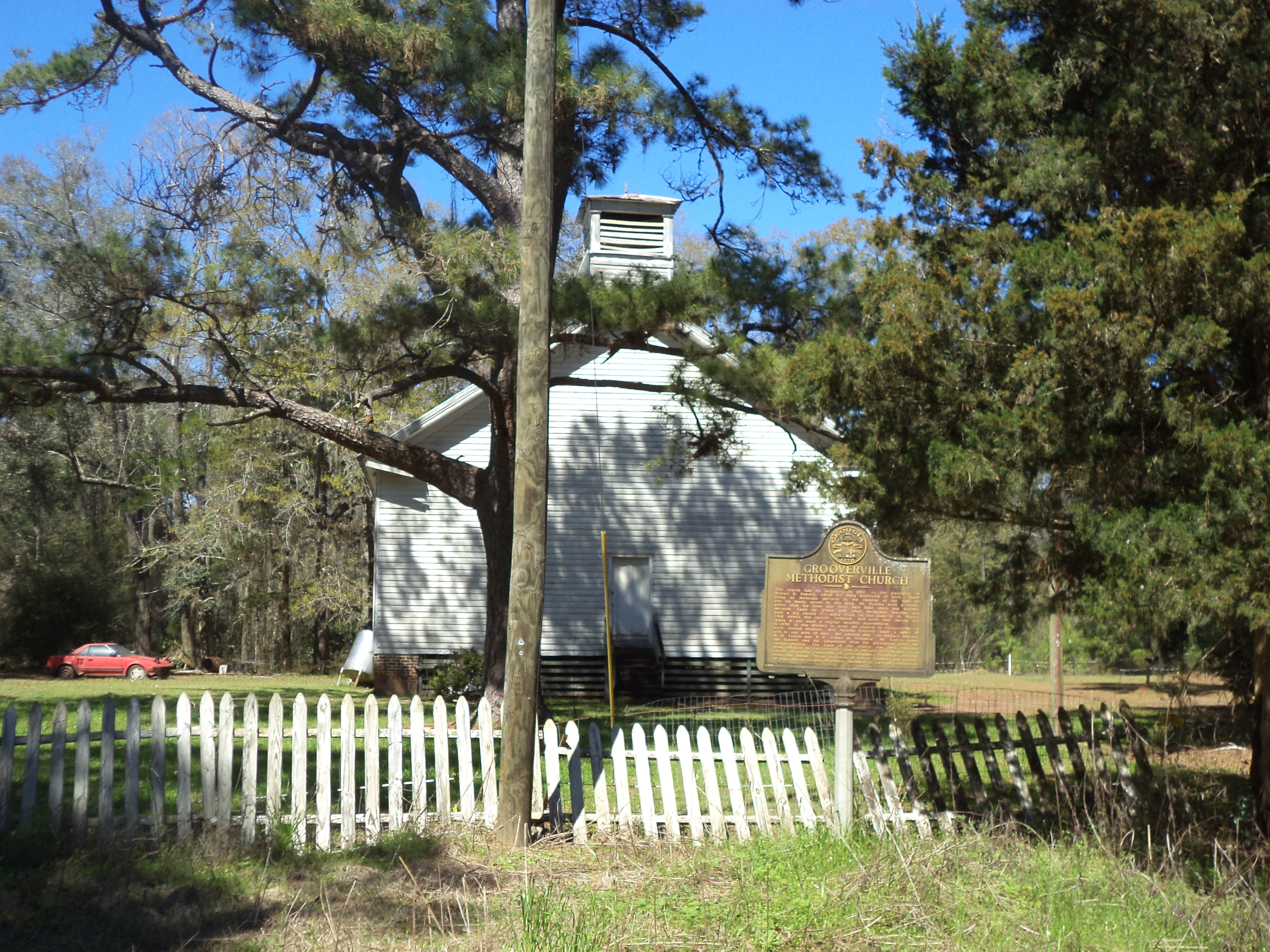
Grooverville Methodist Church

Grooverville is an unincorporated community in Brooks County, Georgia, United States. It was once known as Key and was located at the crossing of the Thomasville and Madison and Sharpe's Store Road, which was in Thomas County before the creation of Brooks County from Lowndes and Thomas counties in 1858.

Grooverville was incorporated on December 8, 1859. The charter of Grooverville was terminated by an act of the Georgia Legislature effective July 1, 1995. Since then, the State of Georgia, Department of Community Affairs, has granted Grooverville Historic Township status.

Grooverville Methodist Church and Liberty Baptist Church, the latter of which was listed on the National Register of Historic Places in 2013, are located in the area.

== Geography ==
Grooverville is located at 30°43′44″N 83°42′54″W (30.729141, -83.715055).

It is a circular area 1.25-mile (2.01 km) in radius from Liberty Church Road and Grooverville Road crossing: 4.9 square miles (13 km^{2}). It is located approximately 11 miles (18 km) west-southwest of Quitman.
