= Brooks County Jail =

Historic jail in the US state of Georgia

- U.S. National Register of Historic Places
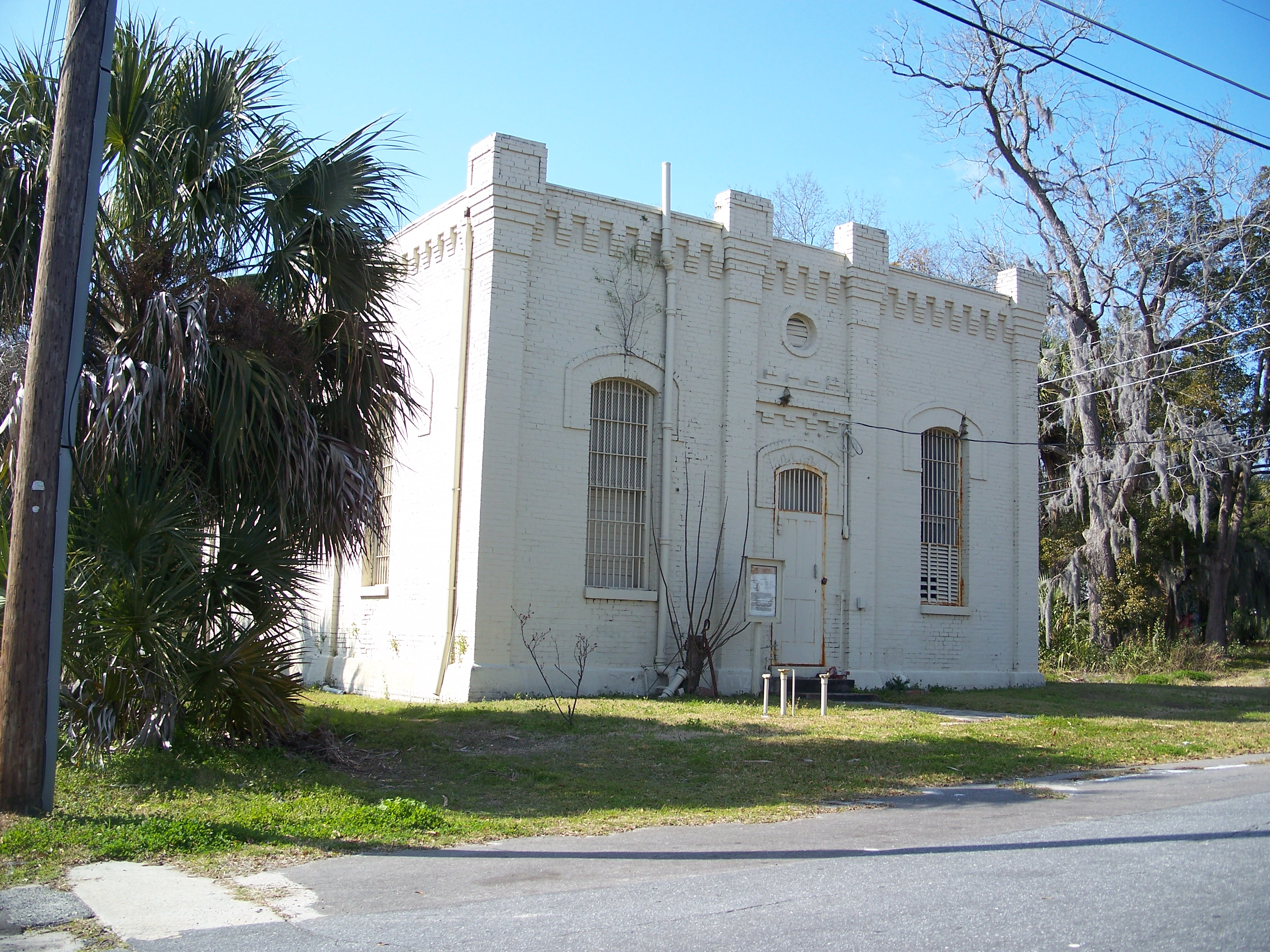

- Location within Georgia
- Location: 200 S. Madison St., Quitman, Georgia
- Coordinates: 30.78406°N 83.56126°W
- Area: less than one acre
- Built: 1884; 142 years ago
- Built by: Remington, Simeon A.
- Architectural style: Romanesque
- MPS: County Jails of Ben Hill, Berrien, Brooks, and Turner Counties TR;Georgia County Courthouses TR
- NRHP reference No.: 82002387
- Added to NRHP: August 26, 1982

The Brooks County Jail is a historic building in Quitman, Georgia. It was built in 1884 and served as Brooks County's only jail until 1980.

It was added to the National Register of Historic Places in 1982. It is located at 200 South Madison Street.

The jail was built in 1884 by contractor Simeon A. Remington to replace an uninsured wooden 1867 jail which "burned to the ground" on June 17, 1880. It was built to be fireproof and cost $3,870 for the building plus $2,000 for its free-standing two-story steel cells. The jail "was considered 'one of the best in the state,' and housed prisoners until 1980 when it no longer met state fire and criminal justice codes. It was a site of executions.

A 1981 review asserted that the building is architecturally significant as "the county's prime example of Romanesque style architecture."

== See also ==
- National Register of Historic Places listings in Brooks County, Georgia
