= Benjamin E. Russell =

American politician

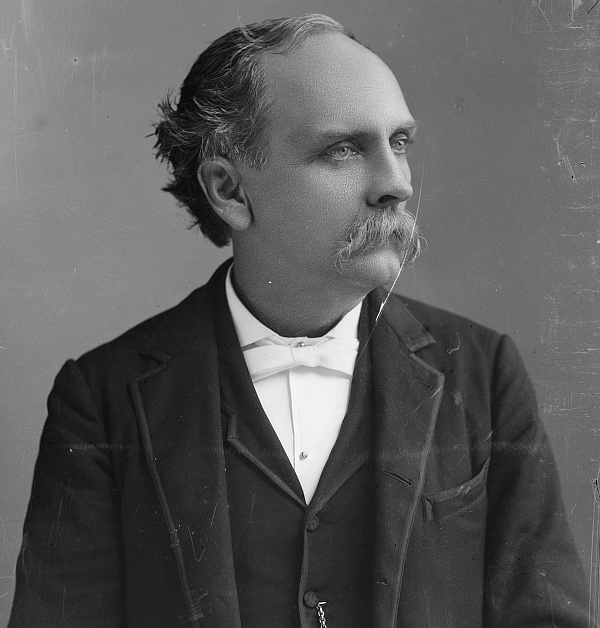

Member of the U.S. House of Representatives from Georgia's 2nd district
- In office March 4, 1893 – March 3, 1897
- Preceded by: Henry G. Turner
- Succeeded by: James M. Griggs

Personal details
- Born: October 5, 1845 Monticello, Florida
- Died: December 4, 1909 (aged 64) Bainbridge, Georgia
- Party: Democratic
- Occupation: businessman, editor

Benjamin Edward Russell (October 5, 1845 – December 4, 1909) was a U.S. representative from Georgia, cousin of Rienzi Melville Johnston.

== Biography ==
Born in Monticello, Florida, Russell moved with his parents to Decatur County, Georgia, in 1854.

He attended the common schools. He entered the Confederate States Army as a drummer boy in the First Georgia Regiment. Upon the disbanding of this regiment, he immediately enlisted in the Eighth Florida Regiment and continued with it during the last three years of the war, with the rank of first lieutenant.

After the Civil War, he entered the printing business. He was editor of the Bainbridge (Georgia) Democrat. He served as delegate to the State constitutional convention in 1877. He served as delegate to the Democratic National Convention in 1880. He served as mayor of Bainbridge in 1881 and 1882. He was a member of the Georgia House of Representatives in 1882 and 1883, and was postmaster of Bainbridge in 1885–1890.

Russell was elected as a Democrat to the Fifty-third and Fifty-fourth Congresses (March 4, 1893 – March 3, 1897).

He was not a candidate for renomination in 1896. He resumed the publication of the Bainbridge Democrat. He died in Bainbridge, Georgia, December 4, 1909. He was interred in Oak City Cemetery.

U.S. House of Representatives
Preceded by Henry G. Turner	Member of the U.S. House of Representatives from Georgia's 2nd congressional district March 4, 1893 – March 3, 1897	Succeeded by James M. Griggs
