= Liberty Baptist Church (Grooverville, Georgia) =

Historic church in Georgia, United States

- U.S. National Register of Historic Places
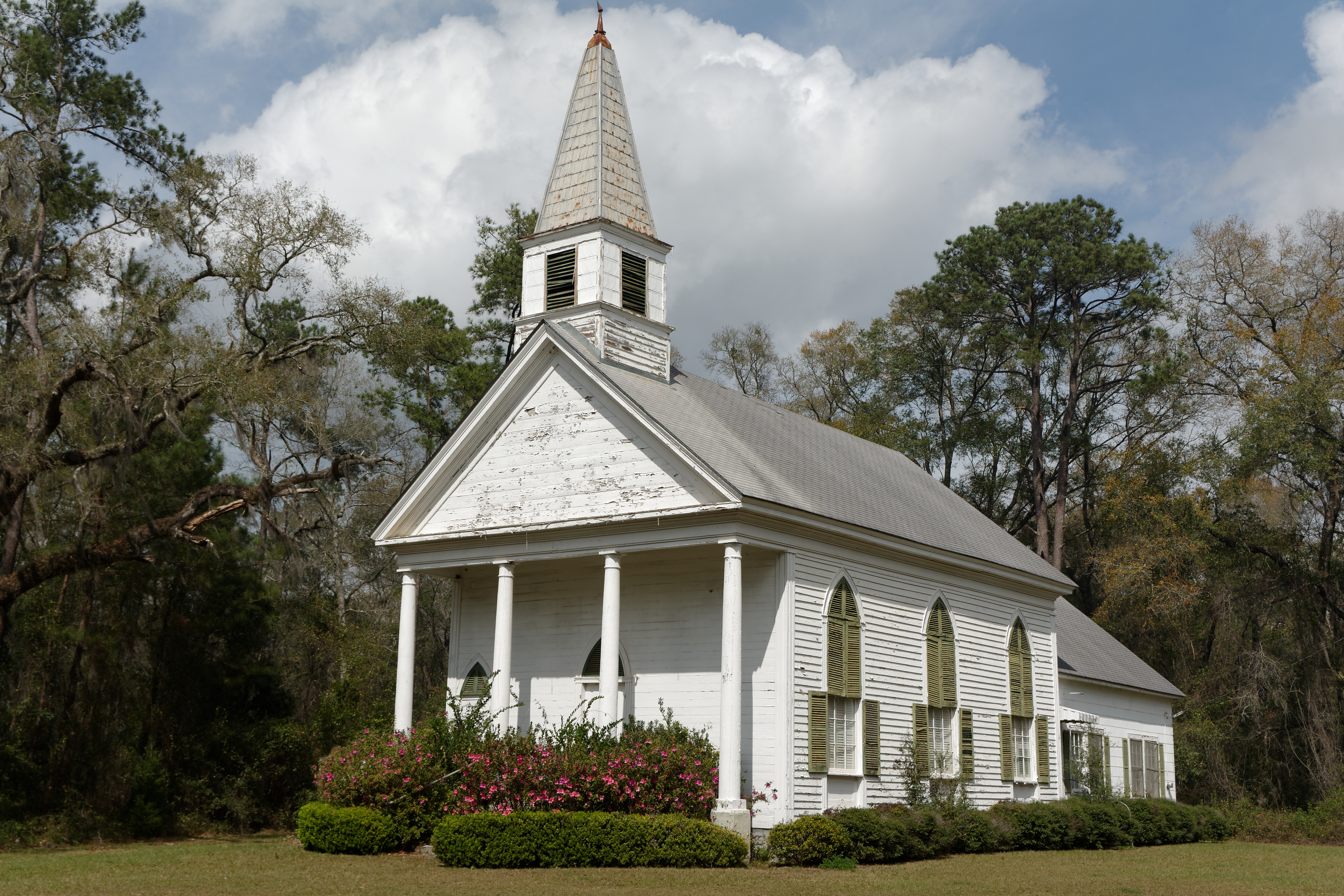
- The church in 2017

- Location within Georgia Location within the United States
- Location: Liberty Church Road, 400 feet NW of Grooverville Road (CR 275), Grooverville, Georgia
- Coordinates: 30.72223°N 83.72808°W
- Built: c. 1858; 168 years ago
- NRHP reference No.: 13000609
- Added to NRHP: August 20, 2013

Liberty Baptist Church is a historic church built about 1858 in Grooverville, Georgia. It was added to the National Register of Historic Places on August 20, 2013. It is located on Liberty Church Road. There is a Georgia Historical Commission historical marker at the site. According to the marker: "In 1841 the Ocklochnee anti-Missionary Baptist Association passed a ruling to dismiss members believing in the 'new fangled institutions of the day.'" One of the excommunicated sisters joined with others in forming the Liberty Baptist Church. The church includes a slave gallery. Freed slaves from the area formed First Elizabeth Church in Grooverville.

== See also ==
- National Register of Historic Places listings in Brooks County, Georgia
- Grooverville Methodist Church
