= List of United States senators in the 61st Congress =

This is a complete list of United States senators during the 61st United States Congress listed by seniority from March 4, 1909, to March 3, 1911.

Order of service is based on the commencement of the senator's first term. Behind this is former service as a senator (only giving the senator seniority within their new incoming class), service as vice president, a House member, a cabinet secretary, or a governor of a state. The final factor is the population of the senator's state.

Senators who were sworn in during the middle of the Congress (up until the last senator who was not sworn in early after winning the November 1910 election) are listed at the end of the list with no number.

== Terms of service ==
Class	Terms of service of senators that expired in years
Class 1	Terms of service of senators that expired in 1911 (CA, CT, DE, FL, IN, MA, MD, ME, MI, MN, MO, MS, MT, ND, NE, NJ, NV, NY, OH, PA, RI, TN, TX, UT, VA, VT, WA, WI, WV, and WY.)
Class 2	Terms of service of senators that expired in 1913 (AL, AR, CO, DE, GA, IA, ID, IL, KS, KY, LA, MA, ME, MI, MN, MS, MT, NC, NE, NH, NJ, OK, OR, RI, SC, SD, TN, TX, VA, WV, and WY.)
Class 3	Terms of service of senators that expired in 1915 (AL, AR, CA, CO, CT, FL, GA, ID, IL, IN, IA, KS, KY, LA, MD, MO, NC, ND, NH, NV, NY, OH, OK, OR, PA, SC, SD, UT, VT, WA, and WI.)

== U.S. Senate seniority list ==
U.S. Senate seniority
Rank	Senator (party-state)	Seniority date	Other factors
1	Eugene Hale (R-ME)	March 4, 1881	
2	William P. Frye (R-ME)	March 18, 1881	
3	Nelson Aldrich (R-RI)	October 5, 1881	
4	Shelby Moore Cullom (R-IL)	March 4, 1883	
5	John W. Daniel (D-VA)	March 4, 1887	
6	Jacob H. Gallinger (R-NH)	March 4, 1891	
7	Henry Cabot Lodge (R-MA)	March 4, 1893	
8	George C. Perkins (R-CA)	July 26, 1893	
9	Julius C. Burrows (R-MI)	January 23, 1895	
10	Clarence D. Clark (R-WY)	January 24, 1895	
11	Francis E. Warren (R-WY)	March 4, 1895	Previously a senator
12	Stephen Elkins (R-WV)	March 4, 1895	Former delegate, former cabinet member
13	Knute Nelson (R-MN)	March 4, 1895	Former governor, Minnesota 20th in population (1890)
14	Benjamin Tillman (D-SC)	March 4, 1895	Former governor, South Carolina 23rd in population (1890)
15	Augustus O. Bacon (D-GA)	March 4, 1895	Georgia 12th in population (1890)
16	Thomas S. Martin (D-VA)	March 4, 1895	Virginia 15th in population (1890)
17	Samuel McEnery (D-LA)	March 4, 1897	Former governor
18	Boies Penrose (R-PA)	March 4, 1897	Pennsylvania 2nd in population (1890)
19	Alexander Clay (D-GA)	March 4, 1897	Georgia 12th in population (1890)
20	Hernando Money (D-MS)	October 8, 1897	
21	John Kean (R-NJ)	March 4, 1899	Former representative
22	Charles A. Culberson (D-TX)	March 4, 1899	Former governor
23	Chauncey Depew (R-NY)	March 4, 1899	New York 1st in population (1890)
24	Albert J. Beveridge (R-IN)	March 4, 1899	Indiana 8th in population (1890)
25	Nathan B. Scott (R-WV)	March 4, 1899	West Virginia 28th in population (1890)
26	Porter McCumber (R-ND)	March 4, 1899	North Dakota 41st in population (1890)
27	James Taliaferro (D-FL)	April 20, 1899	
28	Jonathan P. Dolliver (R-IA)	August 22, 1900	
29	William P. Dillingham (R-VT)	October 18, 1900	
30	Moses Clapp (R-MN)	January 23, 1901	
31	Anselm J. McLaurin (R-MS)	March 4, 1901	Previously a senator
32	Joseph W. Bailey (D-TX)	March 4, 1901	Former representative (10 years)
33	Robert J. Gamble (R-SD)	March 4, 1901	Former representative (4 years)
34	Furnifold M. Simmons (D-NC)	March 4, 1901	Former representative (2 years)
35	Murphy J. Foster (D-LA)	March 4, 1901	Former governor
36	Henry E. Burnham (R-NH)	March 4, 1901	
37	Francis Newlands (D-NV)	March 4, 1903	Former representative
38	William J. Stone (D-MO)	March 4, 1903	Former governor, Missouri 5th in population (1900)
39	James P. Clarke (D-AR)	March 4, 1903	Former governor, Arkansas 25th in population (1900)
40	Lee S. Overman (D-NC)	March 4, 1903	North Carolina 15th in population (1900)
41	Reed Smoot (R-UT)	March 4, 1903	Utah 41st in population (1900)
42	Weldon B. Heyburn (R-ID)	March 4, 1903	Idaho 44th in population (1900)
43	Charles Dick (R-OH)	March 23, 1904	
44	Winthrop M. Crane (R-MA)	October 12, 1904	
45	Thomas Carter (R-MT)	March 4, 1905	Previously a senator
46	Isidor Rayner (D-MD)	March 4, 1905	Former representative (6 years), Maryland 26th in population (1900)
47	Elmer Burkett (R-NE)	March 4, 1905	Former representative (6 years), Nebraska 27th in population (1900)
49	George Sutherland (R-UT)	March 4, 1905	Former representative (2 years)
50	Morgan Bulkeley (R-CT)	March 4, 1905	Former governor
51	Frank P. Flint (R-CA)	March 4, 1905	California 21st in population (1900)
52	Samuel H. Piles (R-WA)	March 4, 1905	Washington 34th in population (1900)
53	George S. Nixon (R-NV)	March 4, 1905	Nevada 46th in population (1900)
54	William Warner (R-MO)	March 18, 1905	
55	James B. Frazier (D-TN)	March 21, 1905	
56	Frank B. Brandegee (R-CT)	May 10, 1905	
57	Robert M. La Follette, Sr. (R-WI)	January 4, 1906	
58	Henry du Pont (R-DE)	June 13, 1906	
59	Charles Curtis (R-KS)	January 29, 1907	
60	William A. Smith (R-MI)	February 9, 1907	
61	Robert Love Taylor (D-TN)	March 4, 1907	Former representative (12 years)
62	Thomas H. Paynter (D-KY)	March 4, 1907	Former representative (6 years)
63	Joseph M. Dixon (R-MT)	March 4, 1907	Former representative (4 years)
64	Jeff Davis (D-AR)	March 4, 1907	Former governor
65	Frank O. Briggs (R-NJ)	March 4, 1907	New Jersey 16th in population (1900)
66	Norris Brown (R-NE)	March 4, 1907	Nebraska 27th in population (1900)
67	Simon Guggenheim (R-CO)	March 4, 1907	Colorado 32nd in population (1900)
68	Jonathan Bourne, Jr. (R-OR)	March 4, 1907	Oregon 36th in population (1900)
69	Harry A. Richardson (R-DE)	March 4, 1907	Delaware 43rd in population (1900)
70	William Borah (R-ID)	March 4, 1907	Idaho 44th in population (1900)
71	Isaac Stephenson (R-WI)	May 17, 1907	
72	John H. Bankhead (D-AL)	June 18, 1907	
73	Joseph F. Johnston (D-AL)	August 6, 1907	
74	Thomas Gore (D-OK)	December 11, 1907	"G" 7th in alphabet
75	Robert Owen (D-OK)	December 11, 1907	"O" 15th in alphabet
76	George P. Wetmore (R-RI)	January 22, 1908	
77	John Walter Smith (D-MD)	March 25, 1908	
78	Carroll S. Page (R-VT)	October 21, 1908	
79	Albert B. Cummins (R-IA)	November 24, 1908	
80	Theodore E. Burton (R-OH)	March 4, 1909	Former representative (16 years)
81	Wesley Jones (R-WA)	March 4, 1909	Former representative (10 years)
82	Martin N. Johnson (R-ND)	March 4, 1909	Former representative (8 years)
83	Benjamin Shively (D-IN)	March 4, 1909	Former representative (7 years)
84	Elihu Root (R-NY)	March 4, 1909	Former cabinet member
85	William O. Bradley (R-KY)	March 4, 1909	Former governor, Kentucky 12th in population (1900)
86	Coe Crawford (R-SD)	March 4, 1909	Former governor, South Dakota 38th in population (1900)
87	Joseph Bristow (R-KS)	March 4, 1909	Kansas 22nd in population (1900)
88	Ellison D. Smith (D-SC)	March 4, 1909	South Carolina 24th in population (1900)
89	Charles J. Hughes (D-CO)	March 4, 1909	Colorado 32nd in population (1900)
90	Duncan U. Fletcher (D-FL)	March 4, 1909	Florida 33rd in population (1900)
91	George Chamberlain (D-OR)	March 4, 1909	Oregon 36th in population (1900)
	George T. Oliver (R-PA)	March 17, 1909	
92	William Lorimer (D-IL)	June 18, 1909	
	Fountain L. Thompson (D-ND)	November 10, 1909	
	James Gordon (D-MS)	December 27, 1909	
	William Purcell (D-ND)	February 1, 1910	
	LeRoy Percy (D-MS)	February 24, 1910	
	Claude A. Swanson (D-VA)	August 1, 1910	
	Lafayette Young (D-IA)	November 12, 1910	
	Joseph M. Terrell (D-GA)	November 17, 1910	
	John Thornton (D-LA)	December 7, 1910	
	Davis Elkins (D-WV)	January 9, 1911	
	Asle Gronna (R-ND)	February 2, 1911	
	Clarence W. Watson (D-WV)	February 2, 1911	

== See also ==
- 61st United States Congress
- List of United States representatives in the 61st Congress
