= William G. Brantley =

American politician

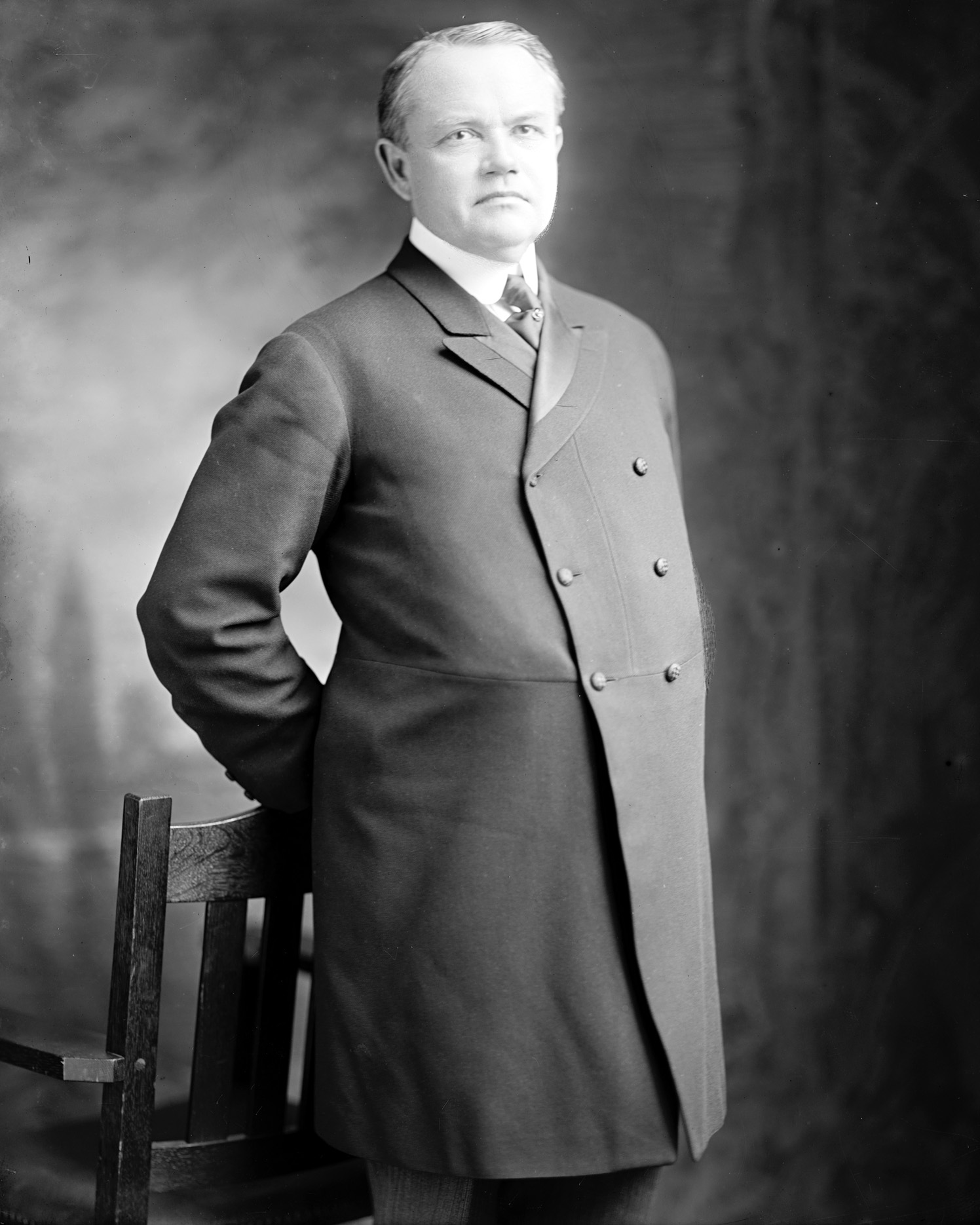

Member of the U.S. House of Representatives from Georgia's 11th district
- In office March 4, 1897 – March 3, 1913
- Preceded by: Henry G. Turner
- Succeeded by: John Randall Walker

Member of the Georgia Senate
- In office 1886 – 1887

Member of the Georgia House of Representatives
- In office 1884 – 1885

Personal details
- Born: September 18, 1860 Blackshear, Georgia, U.S.
- Died: September 11, 1934 (aged 73) Washington, D.C., U.S.
- Party: Democratic
- Education: University of Georgia
- Occupation: Lawyer

William Gordon Brantley (September 18, 1860 – September 11, 1934) was an American politician and lawyer from the state of Georgia in the late 19th and early 20th centuries. He was a Southern Democrat.

== Biography ==
Brantley was born in Blackshear, the county seat of Pierce County, Georgia. He attended the University of Georgia in Athens. After his graduation, he passed the law examinations and gained admission to the state bar in 1881, and began practicing law in Blackshear.

Brantley served in both legislative chambers of the bicameral General Assembly of Georgia during the 1880s. He was first elected to the lower chamber, the Georgia House of Representatives, in 1884 and 1885, and subsequently to the upper house, Georgia Senate, in 1886 and 1887. In 1888, he became solicitor general of the state circuit court in Brunswick.

In 1896, Brantley successfully ran for federal office, winning election as a Democratic candidate to the United States House of Representatives in Georgia's 11th congressional district in the northwest region of the state. He was re-elected to the House for seven more two-year terms, serving from 1897 to 1913, until deciding not to run for re-election 16 years later in the summer of 1912.

At the end of his congressional career, Brantley also served as a delegate to the 1912 Democratic National Convention, which convened in Baltimore's Fifth Regiment Armory. It was one of the most important political presidential nominating conventions in Democratic Party and American history. After a major battle through numerous ballots for the presidential nomination pitting James Beauchamp ("Champ") Clark of Missouri, the powerful Speaker of the House, against Woodrow Wilson, the progressive Governor of New Jersey, Governor Wilson won the party's nomination and later went on to win the presidency.

After his time on Capitol Hill ended, Brantley remained afterwards in Washington for another two decades to continue to practice law there. He died in that city in 1934, and was returned home to Georgia to be buried in Blackshear Cemetery in the town of his birth.

Congressman Brantley and/or his father Benjamin Daniel Brantley are considered to be the namesakes to Brantley County, Georgia, one of the most recent counties to be established in the state. It was separated from three other surrounding counties in southeastern Georgia and organized in 1920.

U.S. House of Representatives
Preceded by Henry G. Turner	Member of the U.S. House of Representatives from Georgia's 11th congressional district March 4, 1897 – March 3, 1913	Succeeded by John Randall Walker
