= Quitman Historic District =

Historic district in Georgia, United States

- U.S. National Register of Historic Places
- U.S. Historic district
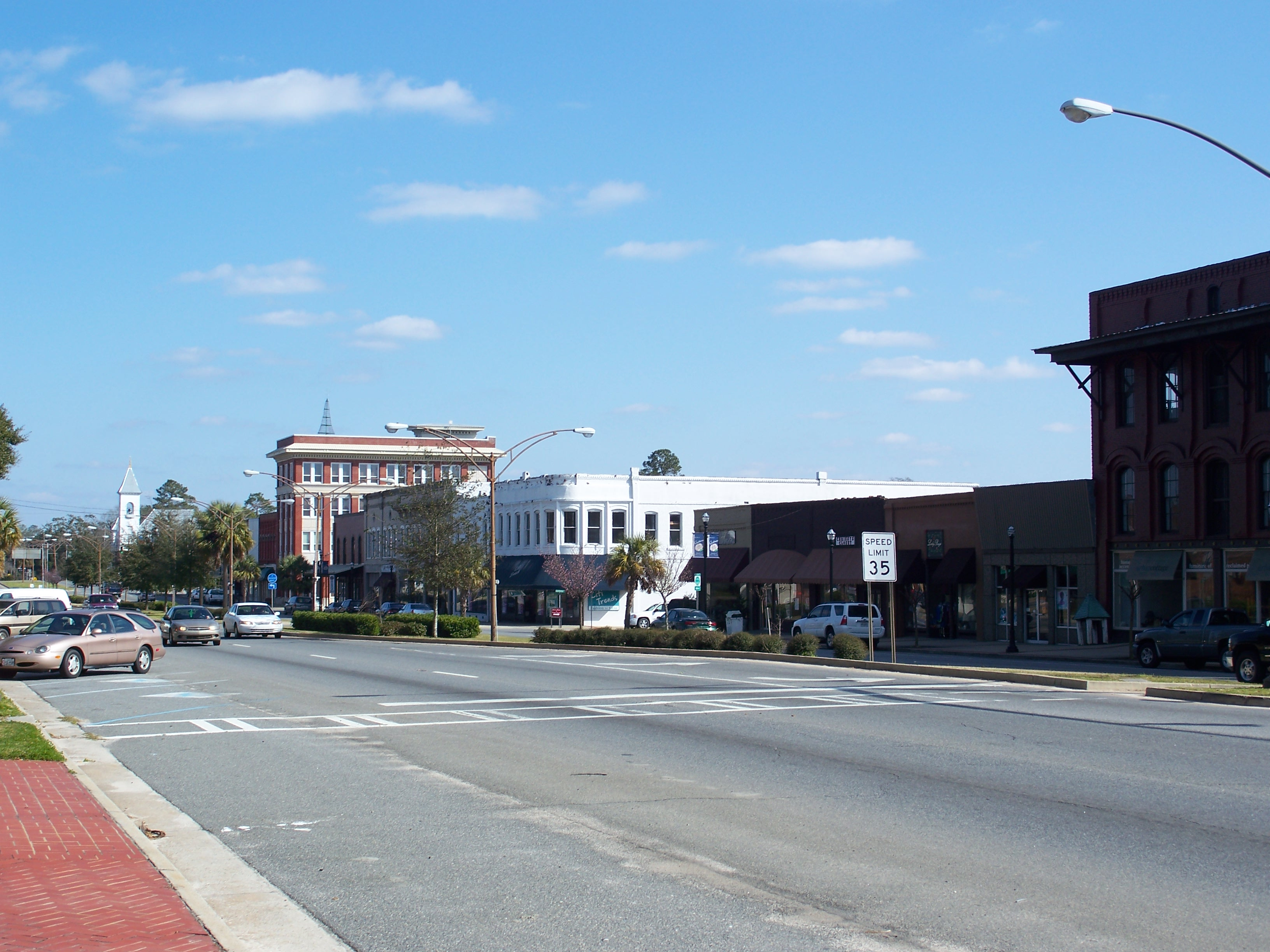

- Location within Georgia Location within the United States
- Location: US 84, Quitman, Georgia
- Area: 417 acres (169 ha)
- Built: 1859
- Architectural style: Mixed (more Than 2 Styles From Different Periods)
- NRHP reference No.: 82002388
- Added to NRHP: July 8, 1982

The Quitman Historic District is a 417-acre (169 ha) historic district located in Quitman, Georgia. It was placed on the National Register of Historic Places in 1982.

The district contains late 19th and early 20th century brick buildings in the commercial district and mainly wood-frame homes from various periods and styles in the residential area. The streets are laid out in a grid with several central parks. It includes 900 contributing buildings.

Four of the buildings are civic buildings in the commercial center of Quitman:

- Brooks County Jail (1884), on Madison Street, an Eclectic Romanesque-style small brick building, separately NRHP-listed
- Quitman City Hall, 220 E. Screven Street, in an 1887 two-masonry opera house building,
- Brooks County Courthouse (1859), separately NRHP-listed, and
- U.S. Post Office building
