= Seaborn Roddenbery =

American politician (1870–1913)

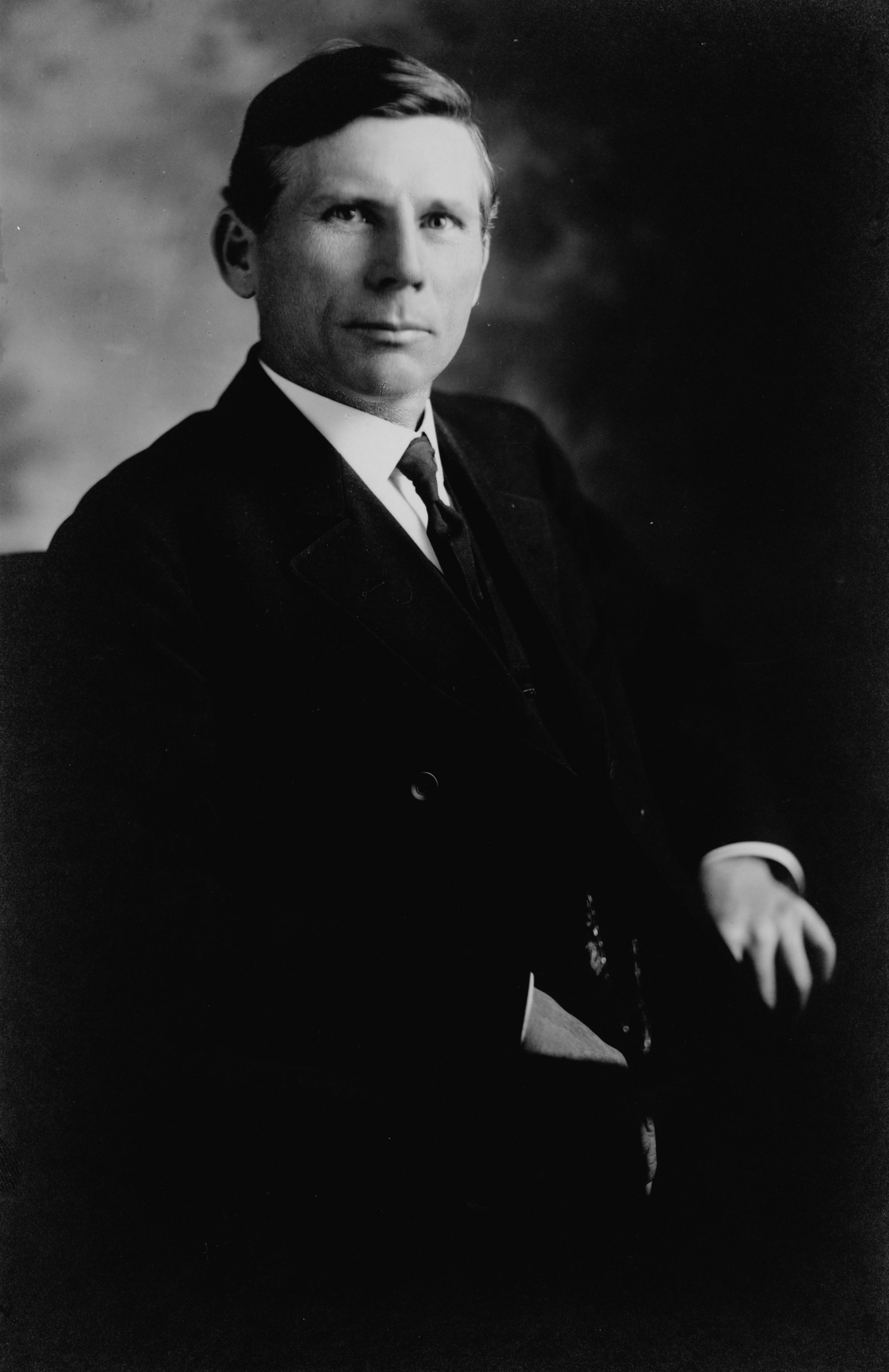
- Seaborn Roddenbery in 1912

Member of the U.S. House of Representatives from Georgia's 2nd district
- In office February 6, 1910 – September 25, 1913
- Preceded by: James M. Griggs
- Succeeded by: Frank Park

Georgia House of Representatives
- In office 1891–1895

Judge Thomas County, Georgia
- In office 1895–1897

Mayor of Thomasville, Georgia
- In office 1903–1904

Personal details
- Born: January 12, 1870 Decatur County, Georgia
- Died: September 25, 1913 (aged 43) Thomasville, Georgia
- Party: Democratic
- Education: Mercer University
- Occupation: lawyer, educator

Seaborn Anderson Roddenbery (January 12, 1870 - September 25, 1913) was a Democratic member of the U.S. House of Representatives from the state of Georgia, known for his proposal of an anti-miscegenation amendment to the United States Constitution. He was elected to the 61st Congress to replace the deceased James M. Griggs, and re-elected to the 62nd and 63rd Congresses before dying in office.

== Early life and career ==
Roddenbery was born on a farm in Decatur County, Georgia, January 12, 1870 to Dr. Seaborn Anderson Roddenbery and Martha America Braswell Roddenbery. The name is sometimes misspelled Roddenberry. His grandfather changed the spelling from Roddenbury. The senior Roddenbery was described as a jack of all trades, who started making batches of open kettle sugar cane syrup, in addition to practicing medicine on horseback. As the syrup business grew, Dr. Roddenbery quit the practice of medicine to concentrate on syrup. That business eventually grew into the W.B. Roddenbery Company, based in Cairo, Georgia. The young Roddenbery attended public schools before enrolling at Mercer University. His studies there only lasted three years, when he was forced to withdraw due to family finances. In 1891, he was elected to represent his home district in the Georgia House of Representatives. After two terms, he was appointed professor of Language and Mathematics at South Georgia College, in McRae, Georgia.

== Political office ==
In 1894, after reading law and being admitted to the practice of law in Georgia, Roddenbery resigned his academic position. He spent the next few years building a private practice and networking within the Georgia political structure. During this time, Roddenbery was the president of the Thomas County, Georgia, Board of Education from 1895 to 1898 and was appointed to that county's court as a judge from 1897 to 1901. Roddenbery was elected mayor of Thomasville, Georgia, and served in that position from 1903 to 1904.

=== Congressman ===
In 1910, Roddenbery was elected to represent Georgia's 2nd congressional district in the United States House of Representatives for the remainder of the 61st United States Congress when that seat fell vacant due to the death of James M. Griggs.

In 1912, Roddenbery demanded Congress fire the black employees of the Pension Office and replace them with white Spanish-American War veterans. Roddenbery was reelected to the 62nd and 63rd Congresses. He died while in office, on September 25, 1913.

The reputation Roddenbery had already garnered in Georgia as a skillful and inspiring orator was renewed in the nation's capitol.

==== Fighting "pension buccaneers" ====
Roddenbery was a conservative on fiscal matters. He earned a reputation for taking on powerful interests which fought to expand the retirement benefits of certain groups which Roddenbery labeled as "pension buccaneers". He was particularly militant in his opposition to increasing the pensions of Civil War Union veterans, while thousands of surviving Confederate veterans in Georgia, a state that endured some of the worst destruction of the war, were ineligible for Federal pensions under the 14th Amendment.

==== Skilled parliamentarian ====
Roddenbery was known as a skilled parliamentarian, who was given to filibustering when faced with legislation he opposed. At the time of his death, he was considered to be one of the top three parliamentarians in the United States House of Representatives.

==== Anti-miscegenation amendment ====
Roddenbery's most lasting reputation was as a passionate opponent of miscegenation (interracial marriage), views that were on the more conservative end of the spectrum even in the early 20th century. The marriage of African American boxer Jack Johnson to white woman Lucille Cameron motivated Roddenbery to introduced H.J. Res 368, in January 1913. The bill proposing a Constitutional amendment to outlaw interracial marriages in the states where it was legal and ban it nationwide. In his appeal to Congress, Roddenberry stated that:

"Intermarriage between whites and blacks is repulsive and averse to every sentiment of pure American spirit. It is abhorrent and repugnant. It is subversive to social peace. It is destructive of moral supremacy, and ultimately this slavery to black beasts will bring this nation to a fatal conflict."

== Private life ==
Roddenbery married Johnnie Butler on November 5, 1891. They had five children. The year after Roddenberry's death, his wife received a federal appointment to the position of postmaster (now "postmistress") of Thomasville, Georgia. She held that post through successive four-year appointments under three Presidents: Wilson, Harding, and Coolidge. The last appointment was announced on December 20, 1928.

== Retirement and death ==
A heavy smoker of cigars, Roddenbery's political career was cut short by throat cancer that forced his retirement from active participation in Congress only a few weeks after the failure of H.J. Res 368. Seemingly unaware of the gravity of his illness, he returned home to Georgia only days before his death, telling colleagues that he hoped to return after a period of rest.

Memorial addresses given in the U.S. House and Senate were published.

Influenced by Roddenbery, anti-miscegenation bills were introduced in 1913 in half of the twenty states where this law did not already exist, though only one, in Wyoming, passed.

U.S. House of Representatives
Preceded by James M. Griggs	Member of the U.S. House of Representatives from Georgia's 2nd congressional district February 6, 1910 – September 25, 1913	Succeeded by Frank Park
