= James M. Griggs =

American politician

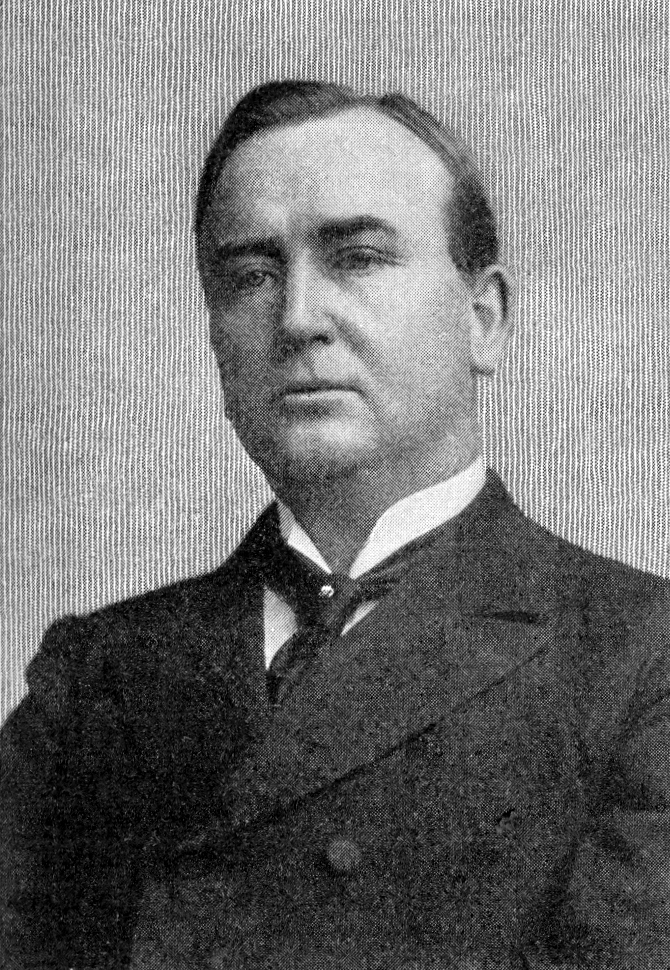

Member of the U.S. House of Representatives from Georgia's 2nd district
- In office March 4, 1897 – January 5, 1910
- Preceded by: Benjamin Edward Russell
- Succeeded by: Seaborn Roddenberry

Chairman of the Democratic Congressional Campaign Committee
- In office 1902–1908
- Preceded by: James D. Richardson
- Succeeded by: James T. Lloyd

Judge of the Pataula Judicial Circuit
- In office 1893–1896

Solicitor General for the Pataula Judicial Circuit
- In office 1888–1893

Personal details
- Born: March 29, 1861 Lagrange, Georgia
- Died: January 5, 1910 (aged 48) Dawson, Georgia
- Party: Democratic
- Education: Peabody Normal College
- Occupation: lawyer, educator

James Mathews Griggs (March 29, 1861 – January 5, 1910) was a U.S. representative from Georgia.

Born in Lagrange, Georgia, Griggs attended the common schools and was graduated from the Peabody Normal College, Nashville, Tennessee, in 1881. He taught school and studied law. He was admitted to the bar in 1883 and commenced the practice of law in Alapaha, Georgia. He engaged in the newspaper business. He moved to Dawson, Georgia, in 1885.

Griggs was elected by the legislature solicitor general of the Pataula judicial circuit in 1888. He was reelected in 1892 and served until his resignation in 1893 to accept appointment by the governor as judge of the Pataula judicial circuit.

Griggs was elected to the same office by the legislature. He was reelected and served until his resignation in 1896 to accept the Democratic nomination for Congress. He served as delegate to the 1892 Democratic National Convention. He served as chairman of the Democratic Congressional Campaign Committee in 1904–1908.

Griggs was elected as a Democrat to the Fifty-fifth and to the six succeeding Congresses and served from March 4, 1897, until his death in Dawson, Georgia, January 5, 1910. He was interred in Cedar Hill Cemetery.

== See also ==
- List of members of the United States Congress who died in office (1900–1949)

U.S. House of Representatives
Preceded by Benjamin Edward Russell	Member of the U.S. House of Representatives from Georgia's 2nd congressional district March 4, 1897 – January 5, 1910	Succeeded by Seaborn Roddenberry
