= Quitman, Georgia =

- City
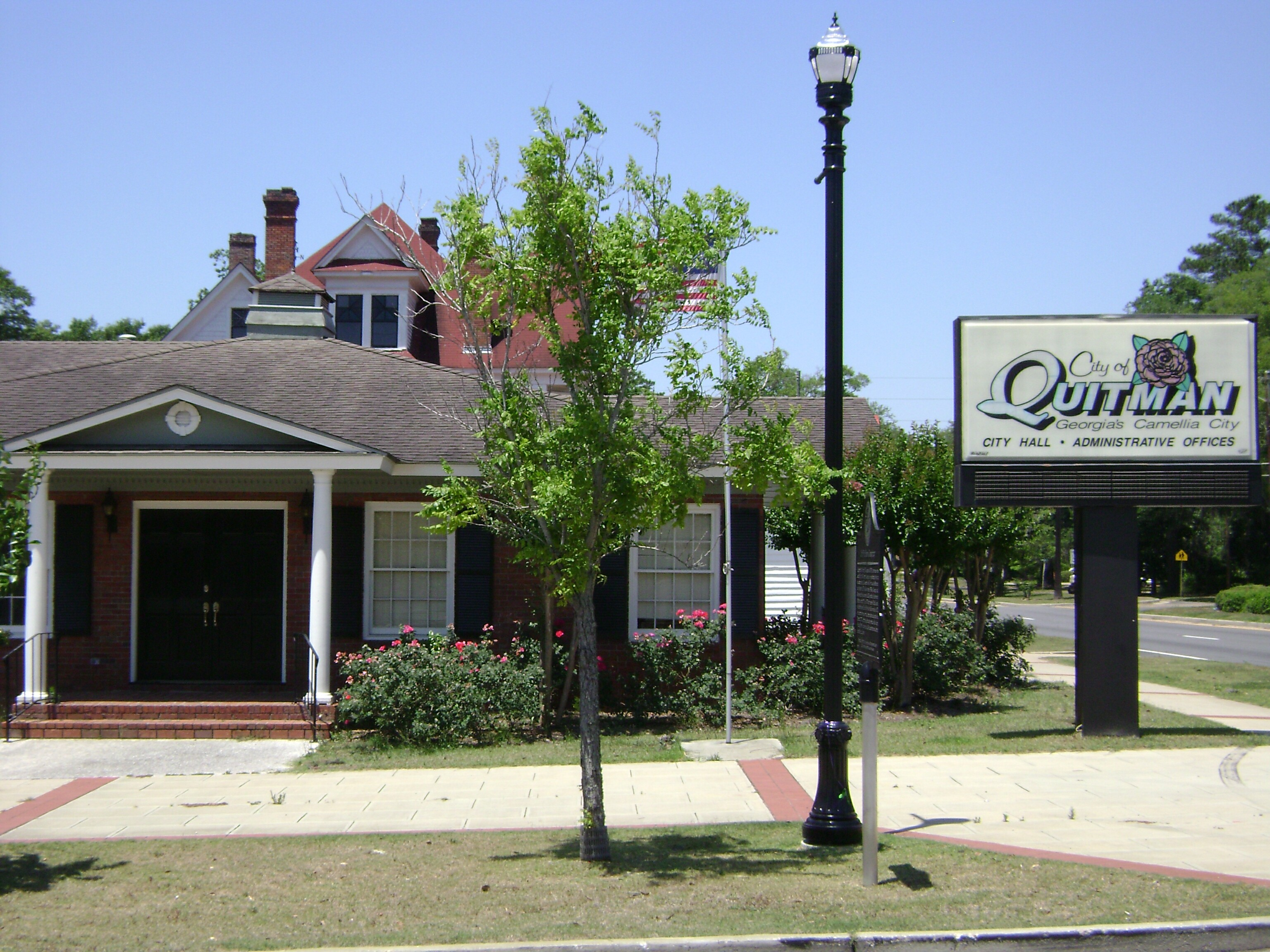
- Quitman City Hall

- Logo
- Nickname: Georgia's Camellia City
- Location in Brooks County and the state of Georgia
- Coordinates: 30°47′5″N 83°33′39″W
- Country: United States
- State: Georgia
- County: Brooks

Government
  - Mayor: Zinda Drew McDaniel

Area
  - Total: 4.15 sq mi (10.74 km^{2})
  - Land: 4.13 sq mi (10.69 km^{2})
  - Water: 0.019 sq mi (0.05 km^{2})
- Elevation: 190 ft (58 m)

Population (2020)
  - Total: 4,064
  - Density: 984.7/sq mi (380.18/km^{2})
- Time zone: UTC-5 (Eastern (EST))
  - Summer (DST): UTC-4 (EDT)
- ZIP code: 31643
- Area code: 229
- FIPS code: 13-63224
- GNIS feature ID: 0321256
- Website: www.quitmanga.gov

Quitman is a city in and the county seat of Brooks County, Georgia, United States. The population was 4,064 in 2020. The Quitman Historic District is listed on the National Register of Historic Places.

Quitman was the home of James Pierpont, author of the song "Jingle Bells" (1857), and uncle of American financier J.P. Morgan. Pierpont was an organist for the First Presbyterian Church. James' daughter, Lillie, was Quitman's first librarian in 1880.

A local Quitman ordinance prohibits chickens from crossing the road.

It is called "Camellia City", as the tree grows in profusion around the area.

== History ==
Quitman was designated the county seat of the newly formed Brooks County in 1858. It was incorporated as a town in 1859 and as a city in 1904. As the county seat, it was the center of trading in the county, which was devoted to cotton plantations before and after the American Civil War. The community was named for John A. Quitman, a hero of the Mexican–American War.

== Geography ==
Quitman is located in southern Georgia at 30°47′05″N 83°33′39″W. U.S. Routes 84 and 221 pass through the center of the city. US 84 leads west 121 miles to Dothan, Alabama, while US 221 leads south 24 miles (39 km) to Greenville, Florida, and 26 miles (42 km) to Interstate 10. US 84 and US 221 together lead east 15 miles (24 km) to Interstate 75 and 17 miles (27 km) to Valdosta.

According to the United States Census Bureau, Quitman has a total area of 4.1 square miles (10.7 km^{2}), of which 0.019 square miles (0.05 km^{2}), or .50%, is water.

=== Climate ===
The climate in this area is characterized by hot, humid summers and generally mild to cool winters. According to the Köppen Climate Classification System, Quitman has a humid subtropical climate, abbreviated "Cfa" on climate maps. As of 2023, Quitman is in USDA hardiness zone 9a.

Climate data for Quitman, Georgia
Month	Jan	Feb	Mar	Apr	May	Jun	Jul	Aug	Sep	Oct	Nov	Dec	Year
Mean daily maximum °C (°F)	64 (18)	67 (19)	73 (23)	80 (27)	87 (31)	91 (33)	92 (33)	91 (33)	88 (31)	81 (27)	73 (23)	65 (18)	79 (26)
Mean daily minimum °C (°F)	40 (4)	42 (6)	48 (9)	54 (12)	61 (16)	68 (20)	70 (21)	70 (21)	66 (19)	56 (13)	46 (8)	40 (4)	55 (13)
Average precipitation mm (inches)	4.1 (100)	4.4 (110)	4.6 (120)	3.6 (91)	3.5 (89)	5.7 (140)	6.9 (180)	6 (150)	4.6 (120)	2.5 (64)	2.5 (64)	3.7 (94)	51.9 (1,320)
Source: Weatherbase

== Demographics ==
Historical population
Census	Pop.	Note	%±
1870	784		—
1880	1,400		78.6%
1890	1,868		33.4%
1900	2,281		22.1%
1910	3,915		71.6%
1920	4,393		12.2%
1930	4,149		−5.6%
1940	4,450		7.3%
1950	4,769		7.2%
1960	5,071		6.3%
1970	4,818		−5.0%
1980	5,188		7.7%
1990	5,292		2.0%
2000	4,638		−12.4%
2010	3,850		−17.0%
2020	4,064		5.6%
U.S. Decennial Census; 1850-1870 1870-1880; 1890-1910 1920-1930; 1940 1950 1960; 1970 1980 1990; 2000 2010

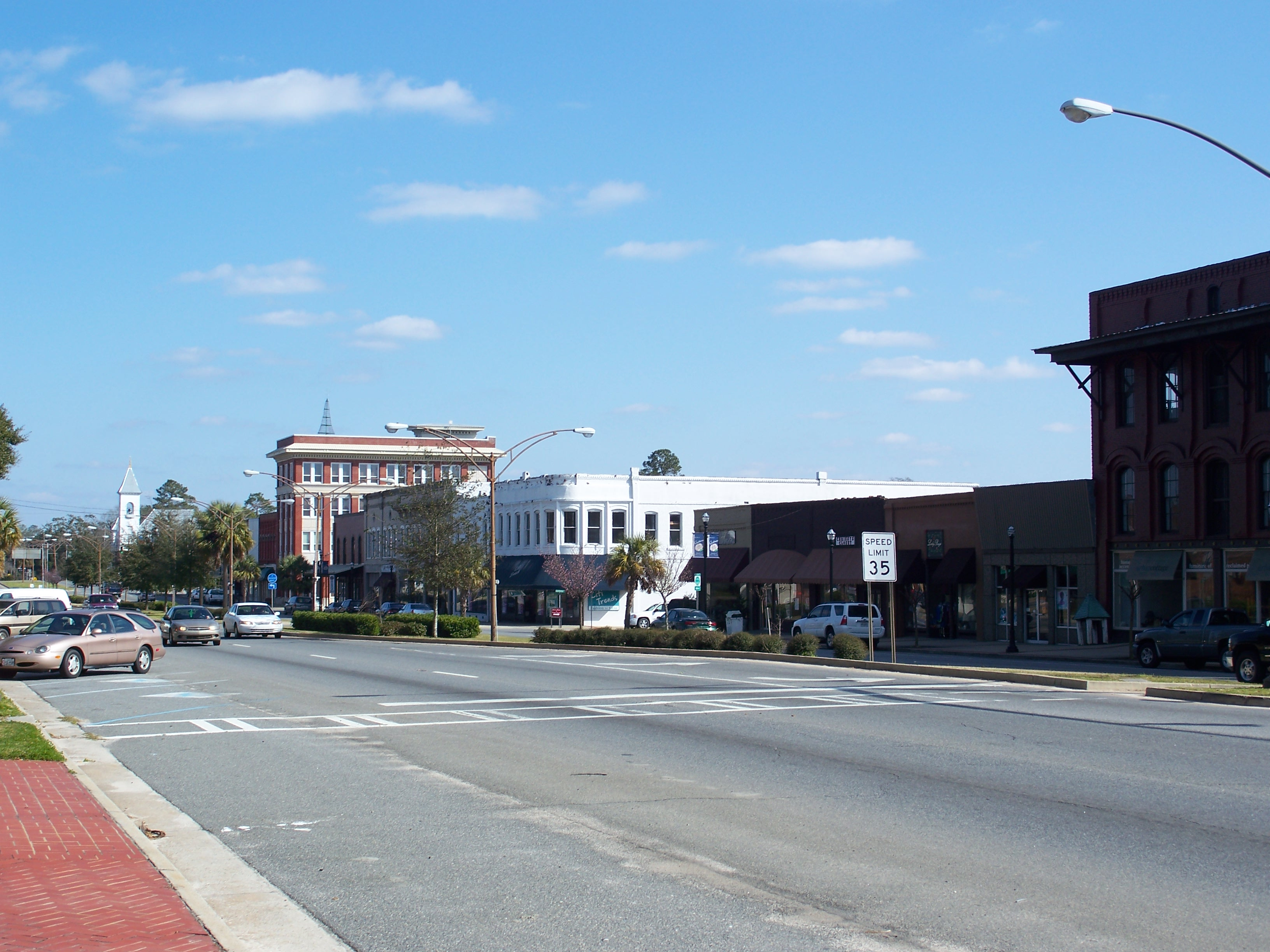
US 84, part of the Quitman Historic District

=== 2020 census ===
As of the 2020 census, Quitman had a population of 4,064. The median age was 39.0 years. 26.3% of residents were under the age of 18 and 18.3% were 65 years of age or older. For every 100 females, there were 80.6 males, and for every 100 females age 18 and over, there were 77.1 males age 18 and over.

0.0% of residents lived in urban areas, while 100.0% lived in rural areas.

There were 1,637 households, including 836 families, in Quitman. Of all households, 32.4% had children under the age of 18 living in them, 25.3% were married-couple households, 18.8% were households with a male householder and no spouse or partner present, and 48.7% were households with a female householder and no spouse or partner present. About 31.5% of all households were made up of individuals, and 15.6% had someone living alone who was 65 years of age or older.

There were 1,881 housing units, of which 13.0% were vacant. The homeowner vacancy rate was 2.4% and the rental vacancy rate was 9.2%.

Quitman racial composition as of 2020
Race	Num.	Perc.
White	983	24.19%
Black or African American	2,805	69.02%
Native American	3	0.07%
Asian	30	0.74%
Pacific Islander	2	0.05%
Other/Mixed	113	2.78%
Hispanic or Latino	128	3.15%

== Industry ==
The prevalent industries in Quitman are farming and automotive.

== Education ==
Schools for Quitman are Early Learning Center, Quitman Elementary School, Brooks County Middle School, Brooks County High School, and Delta Innovative.

== Media ==
Radio station WGOV-FM 96.7 is licensed to broadcast from Quitman. The Quitman Free Press, a weekly newspaper, is the official legal publication for Brooks County. It has been in operation since 1876.

== Notable people ==
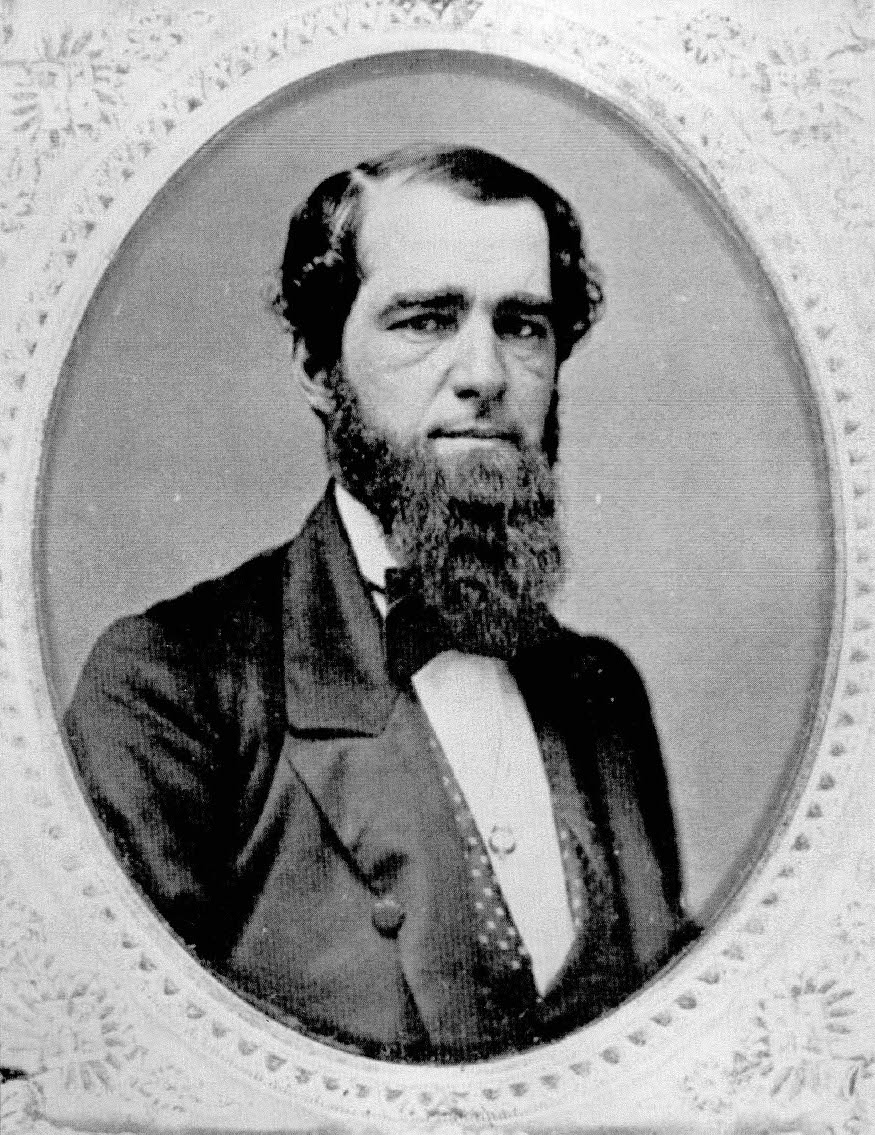
James Lord Pierpont

- Nellie Weldon Cocroft - ragtime composer, born in Quitman
- Edna Cain Daniel, writer, journalist, long-time publisher of the Quitman Free Press
- Dana A. Dorsey - Banker, realtor, business executive, and philanthropist. Child of freed slaves.
- Henry L. Reaves - politician, farmer, and cattleman
- James Lord Pierpont - songwriter of Jingle Bells, church organist, taught at the Quitman Academy. Uncle of J.P. Morgan.
