= Struble =

Struble may refer to:

- Struble, Iowa, United States
- Struble, Pennsylvania, United States

Struble is a surname. Notable people with the surname include:

- Arthur Dewey Struble (1894–1983), American admiral
- Doris June Struble (1895-1976), American pianist, singer, dramatic reader
- Eva Struble (born 1981), American painters
- George R. Struble (1836–1918), Speaker of the Iowa House, 1882–84
- Isaac S. Struble (1843–1913), American congressman, 1883–1891
- J. Curtis Struble (born 1953), U.S. diplomat
- Jayden Struble (born 2001), American ice hockey player
- John T. Struble (1828–1916), Iowa City pioneer
- Bob Struble (1899–1967), welfare reformer
- Robert Struble Jr. (1943–2016), author, teacher
- Sloan Struble (born 1999), American singer, songwriter, producer

== See also ==
- Antje Rávic Strubel (born 1974), German writer
