= List of United States representatives in the 62nd Congress =

This is a complete list of United States representatives during the 62nd United States Congress listed by seniority. For the most part, representatives are ranked by the beginning of their terms in office.

As an historical article, the districts and party affiliations listed reflect those during the 62nd Congress (March 4, 1911 – March 3, 1913). Seats and party affiliations on similar lists for other congresses will be different for certain members.

This article describes the criteria for seniority in the House of Representatives and sets out the list of members by seniority. It is prepared on the basis of the interpretation of seniority applied to the House of Representatives in the current congress. In the absence of information to the contrary, it is presumed that the twenty-first-century practice is identical to the seniority customs used during the 62nd Congress.

== Seniority ==
=== House seniority ===
Seniority in the House, for representatives with unbroken service, depends on the date on which the members first term began. That date is either the start of the Congress (4 March in odd numbered years, for the era up to and including the 73rd Congress starting in 1933) or the date of a special election during the Congress. Since many members start serving on the same day as others, ranking between them is based on alphabetical order by the last name of the representative.

Representatives who return to the House, after having previously served, are credited with service equal to one less than the total number of terms they served. When a representative has served a prior term of less than two terms (i.e., prior term minus one equals less than one), he is ranked above all others whose service begins on the same day.

=== Committee seniority ===
Until 1910, House committee members and chairmen were selected by the Speaker, who also ranked the members of the committee. Seniority on the committee was just one of the factors that was taken into account in ranking the members. In the 61st Congress, Speaker Cannon (R-IL) had used his power to change committee assignments to demote and punish insurgent Republicans. In March 1910 the Speaker was stripped of his powers over the composition of standing committees.

As a result of the events of 1910, at the start of the 62nd Congress in 1911, the committee assignments were proposed by each party and then formally approved by the whole House. Each party controlled the committee ranking of its members, but usually this followed the order of seniority of members in terms of service on the committee. It became customary for members of a committee, in the previous congress, to be re-appointed at the start of the next.

An informal seniority rule was normally used to decide committee chairmen, similar to that which the Senate had usually followed since 1846. The chairman was likely to be the majority member of a committee, with the longest continuous service on it. However, party leadership was typically not associated with seniority.

Out of the group of fifty two standing committee chairmen, at the start of this Congress, Nelson Polsby identified twenty five as the most senior member of the majority on the committee. In the other twenty seven cases, twenty one senior majority members were compensated for not being chairman of the committee (nine chaired another committee, two obtained leadership posts and ten received better committee assignments than in the previous Congress). Thus only in six instances was the seniority custom violated, without obvious compensation for the representative passed over.

== Committees ==
This list refers to the standing committees of the House in the 62nd Congress, the year of establishment as a standing committee (adoption of the name used in 1911), the number of members assigned to the committee and the corresponding committee in the current congress. Because of consolidation of committees and changes of jurisdiction, it is not always possible to identify a clear successor panel.

No.	1911 committee	Established	Members	2011 committee
1	Accounts	1805	11	House Administration
2	Agriculture	1820	21	Agriculture
3	Alcoholic Liquor Traffic	1893	11	Judiciary
4	Appropriations	1865	21	Appropriations
5	Banking and Currency	1865	21	Financial Services
6	Census	1901	16	Oversight and Government Reform
7	Claims	1794	16	Judiciary
8	Coinage, Weights and Measures	1864 (1867)	18	Financial Services
9	District of Columbia	1808	21	Oversight and Government Reform
10	Education	1867 (1883)	15	Education and the Workforce
11	Election of President, Vice President and Representatives	1893	13	House Administration
12	Elections No. 1	1789 (1895)	9	House Administration
13	Elections No. 2	1895	9	House Administration
14	Elections No. 3	1895	9	House Administration
15	Enrolled Bills	1876	7	House Administration
16	Expenditures in the Agriculture Department	1889	7	Oversight and Government Reform
17	Expenditures in the Commerce and Labor Department	1903	7	Oversight and Government Reform
18	Expenditures in the Interior Department	1860	7	Oversight and Government Reform
19	Expenditures in the Justice Department	1874	7	Oversight and Government Reform
20	Expenditures in the Navy Department	1816	7	Oversight and Government Reform
21	Expenditures in the Post Office Department	1816	7	Oversight and Government Reform
22	Expenditures in the State Department	1816	7	Oversight and Government Reform
23	Expenditures in the Treasury Department	1816	7	Oversight and Government Reform
24	Expenditures in the War Department	1816	7	Oversight and Government Reform
25	Expenditures on Public Buildings	1816	7	Oversight and Government Reform
26	Foreign Affairs	1822	21	Foreign Affairs
27	Immigration and Naturalization	1893	15	Judiciary
28	Indian Affairs	1821	19	Natural Resources
29	Industrial Arts and Expositions	1903	16	Foreign Affairs
30	Insular Affairs	1899	21	Natural Resources
31	Interstate and Foreign Commerce	1795 (1892)	21	Energy and Commerce
32	Invalid Pensions	1831	16	Veterans' Affairs
33	Irrigation of Arid Lands	1893	13	Natural Resources
34	Judiciary	1813	21	Judiciary
35	Labor	1883	13	Education and the Workforce
36	Merchant Marine and Fisheries	1887	21	...
37	Mileage	1837	5	House Administration
38	Military Affairs	1822	21	Armed Services
39	Mines and Mining	1865	14	Natural Resources
40	Naval Affairs	1822	21	Armed Services
41	Patents	1837	14	Judiciary
42	Pensions	1880	15	Veterans' Affairs
43	Post Office and Post Roads	1808	21	Oversight and Government Reform
44	Public Buildings and Grounds	1837	17	Transportation and Infrastructure
45	Public Lands	1805	21	Natural Resources
46	Railways and Canals	1831 (1869)	14	Transportation and Infrastructure
47	Reform in the Civil Service	1893	13	Oversight and Government Reform
48	Revision of Laws	1868	13	Judiciary
49	Rivers and Harbors	1883	21	Transportation and Infrastructure
50	Rules	1880	11	Rules
51	Territories	1825	16	Natural Resources
52	War Claims	1825 (1873)	15	Judiciary
53	Ways and Means	1802	21	Ways and Means
Joint Committees (House standing committee members only)
Jt 1	Library Joint	1806	5	House Administration
Jt 2	Printing Joint	1846	3	House Administration
New standing committees, established during the 62nd Congress
54	Disposition of Executive Papers	1911	2	House Administration

== List of representatives by seniority ==
A numerical rank is assigned to each of the 391 members initially elected to the 62nd Congress. Other members, who joined the House during the Congress, are not assigned a number (apart from the Representatives from the two new states, admitted during the Congress, who are numbered 392-394). Two representatives-elect were not sworn in; of whom one died and one resigned before the Congress started. The list below includes the representatives-elect (with names in italics), with the seniority they would have held if they had been able to be sworn in.

Major party designations used in this article are D for Democratic members and R for Republican representatives. Other designations include Ind for Independent, Prog R for Progressive Republican and Soc for Socialist.

U.S. House seniority
Rank	Representative	Party	District	Seniority date	Notes
Nineteen non-consecutive terms
1	Joseph G. Cannon	R	IL-18	March 4, 1893	Previously served 1873-91 while in the House. Last term while serving in the House until 64th Congress
Seventeen consecutive terms
2	Henry H. Bingham	R	PA-1	March 4, 1879	Dean of the House. Died on March 22, 1912, while still serving in the House.
Fourteen non-consecutive terms
3	Sereno E. Payne	R	NY-31	December 2, 1889	Previously served 1883-87 while in the House.
Thirteen consecutive terms
4	John Dalzell	R	PA-30	March 4, 1887	Last term while serving in the House.
Eleven consecutive terms
5	William A. Jones	D	VA-1	March 4, 1891	Chairman: Insular Affairs
Ten consecutive terms
6	Richard Bartholdt	R	MO-10	March 4, 1893	
7	Henry A. Cooper	R	WI-1	March 4, 1893	
8	John J. Gardner	R	NJ-2	March 4, 1893	Last term while serving in the House.
9	Frederick H. Gillett	R	MA-2	March 4, 1893	
10	Henry C. Loudenslager	R	NJ-1	March 4, 1893	Died on August 12, 1911, while still serving in the House.
11	Samuel W. McCall	R	MA-8	March 4, 1893	Last term while serving in the House.
Nine consecutive terms
12	Charles L. Bartlett	D	GA-6	March 4, 1895	
13	George E. Foss	R	IL-10	March 4, 1895	Last term while serving in the House until 64th Congress
14	E. Stevens Henry	R	CT-1	March 4, 1895	Last term while serving in the House.
15	Ebenezer J. Hill	R	CT-4	March 4, 1895	Last term while serving in the House until 64th Congress
16	Stephen M. Sparkman	D	FL-1	March 4, 1895	Chairman: Rivers and Harbors
17	Cyrus A. Sulloway	R	NH-1	March 4, 1895	Last term while serving in the House until 64th Congress
18	William Sulzer	D	NY-10	March 4, 1895	Chairman: Foreign Affairs. Resigned December 31, 1912 while still serving in the House.
19	George W. Prince	R	IL-15	December 2, 1895	Last term while serving in the House.
Nine non-consecutive terms
20	James B. (Champ) Clark	D	MO-9	March 4, 1897	Speaker of the House. Previously served 1893-95 while serving in the House.
21	Oscar W. Underwood	D	AL-9	March 4, 1897	Chairman: Ways and Means. Majority Leader. Previously served 1895-June 9, 1896 while in the House.
Eight consecutive terms
22	William C. Adamson	D	GA-4	March 4, 1897	Chairman: Interstate and Foreign Commerce
23	William G. Brantley	D	GA-11	March 4, 1897	Last term while serving in the House.
24	Robert F. Broussard	D	LA-3	March 4, 1897	
25	Thomas S. Butler	R	PA-7	March 4, 1897	Ind R, 1897–99
26	Henry D. Clayton	D	AL-3	March 4, 1897	Chairman: Judiciary
27	Edgar D. Crumpacker	R	IN-10	March 4, 1897	Last term while serving in the House.
28	James H. Davidson	R	WI-8	March 4, 1897	Last term while serving in the House until 65th Congress
29	Edward L. Hamilton	R	MI-4	March 4, 1897	
30	James Hay	D	VA-7	March 4, 1897	Chairman: Military Affairs
31	Robert L. Henry	D	TX-11	March 4, 1897	Chairman: Rules
32	John Lamb	D	VA-3	March 4, 1897	Chairman: Agriculture. Last term while serving in the House.
33	James R. Mann	R	IL-2	March 4, 1897	Minority Leader
34	John A. Moon	D	TN-3	March 4, 1897	Chairman: Post Office and Post Roads
35	Marlin E. Olmsted	R	PA-18	March 4, 1897	Last term while serving in the House.
36	Thetus W. Sims	D	TN-8	March 4, 1897	Chairman: War Claims
37	James L. Slayden	D	TX-14	March 4, 1897	
38	Samuel W. Smith	R	MI-6	March 4, 1897	
39	John H. Stephens	D	TX-13	March 4, 1897	Chairman: Indian Affairs
40	Frederick C. Stevens	R	MN-4	March 4, 1897	
41	George W. Taylor	D	AL-1	March 4, 1897	
42	James T. Lloyd	D	MO-1	June 1, 1897	Chairman: Accounts
43	George P. Lawrence	R	MA-1	November 2, 1897	Last term while serving in the House.
44	William S. Greene	R	MA-13	May 31, 1898	
Eight non-consecutive terms
45	Frank W. Mondell	R	WY-al	March 4, 1899	Previously served 1895-97 while serving in the House.
Seven consecutive terms
46	Albert S. Burleson	D	TX-10	March 4, 1899	Democratic Caucus Chairman
47	John L. Burnett	D	AL-7	March 4, 1899	Chairman: Immigration and Naturalization
48	Michael E. Driscoll	R	NY-29	March 4, 1899	Last term while serving in the House.
49	John J. Esch	R	WI-7	March 4, 1899	
50	David E. Finley	D	SC-5	March 4, 1899	
51	John J. Fitzgerald	D	NY-7	March 4, 1899	Chairman: Appropriations
52	Joseph W. Fordney	R	MI-8	March 4, 1899	
53	Gilbert N. Haugen	R	IA-4	March 4, 1899	
54	James C. Needham	R	CA-6	March 4, 1899	Last term while serving in the House.
55	Ernest W. Roberts	R	MA-7	March 4, 1899	
56	William W. Rucker	D	MO-2	March 4, 1899	Chairman: Election of President, Vice President and Representatives
57	John H. Small	D	NC-1	March 4, 1899	
58	Joseph E. Ransdell	D	LA-5	August 29, 1899	Last term while serving in the House.
59	Dorsey W. Shackleford	D	MO-8	August 29, 1899	
60	Edward B. Vreeland	R	NY-37	November 7, 1899	Last term while serving in the House.
61	William N. Richardson	D	AL-8	August 6, 1900	Chairman: Pensions
62	Walter I. Smith	R	IA-9	December 3, 1900	Resigned March 15, 1911, to become a U.S. Circuit Judge
Six consecutive terms
63	Arthur L. Bates	R	PA-25	March 4, 1901	Last term while serving in the House.
64	George F. Burgess	D	TX-9	March 4, 1901	
65	Ezekiel S. Candler, Jr.	D	MS-1	March 4, 1901	
66	Frank D. Currier	R	NH-2	March 4, 1901	Republican Conference Chairman. Last term while serving in the House.
67	William H. Draper	D	NY-22	March 4, 1901	Last term while serving in the House.
68	Henry D. Flood	D	VA-10	March 4, 1901	Chairman: Territories (1911–13). Chairman: Foreign Affairs (1913).
69	David J. Foster	R	VT-1	March 4, 1901	Died on March 21, 1912, while still serving in the House.
70	Henry M. Goldfogle	D	NY-9	March 4, 1901	Chairman: Elections No. 3
71	James A. Hughes	R	WV-5	March 4, 1901	
72	Joseph T. Johnson	D	SC-4	March 4, 1901	
73	Claude Kitchin	D	NC-2	March 4, 1901	
74	George H. Lindsay	D	NY-2	March 4, 1901	Last term while serving in the House.
75	Lemuel P. Padgett	D	TN-7	March 4, 1901	Chairman: Naval Affairs
76	Edward W. Pou	D	NC-4	March 4, 1901	Chairman: Claims
77	Choice B. Randell	D	TX-4	March 4, 1901	Last term while serving in the House.
78	Asbury F. Lever	D	SC-7	November 5, 1901	Chairman: Education
79	John W. Dwight	R	NY-30	November 4, 1902	Minority Whip. Last term while serving in the House.
80	Augustus P. Gardner	R	MA-6	November 4, 1902	
81	Carter Glass	D	VA-6	November 4, 1902	
82	Morris Sheppard	D	TX-1	November 15, 1902	Resigned to become US Senator: February 3, 1913
Six non-consecutive terms
83	Charles H. Burke	R	SD-al	March 4, 1909	Previously served 1899–1907 while in the House.
84	Julius Kahn	R	CA-4	March 4, 1905	Previously served 1899–1903 while in the House.
85	William A. Rodenberg	R	IL-22	March 4, 1903	Previously served 1899–1901 while in the House. Last term while serving in the House until 64th Congress
86	J. Frederick Talbott	D	MD-2	March 4, 1909	Previously served 1879-85 and 1893–95 while in the House.
87	Eben W. Martin	R	SD-al	November 3, 1908	Previously served 1901-07 while in the House.
Five consecutive terms
88	Wyatt Aiken	D	SC-3	March 4, 1903	
89	Butler Ames	R	MA-5	March 4, 1903	Last term while serving in the House.
90	James A. Beall	D	TX-5	March 4, 1903	Chairman: Expenditures in the Justice Department
91	Thomas W. Bradley	R	NY-20	March 4, 1903	Last term while serving in the House.
92	Philip P. Campbell	R	KS-3	March 4, 1903	
93	Charles R. Davis	R	MN-3	March 4, 1903	
94	Charles E. Fuller	R	IL-12	March 4, 1903	Last term while serving in the House until 64th Congress
95	John N. Garner	D	TX-15	March 4, 1903	
96	Alexander W. Gregg	D	TX-7	March 4, 1903	
97	Thomas W. Hardwick	D	GA-10	March 4, 1903	Chairman: Coinage, Weights and Measures
98	Joseph Howell	R	UT-al	March 4, 1903	
99	William E. Humphrey	R	WA-1	March 4, 1903	
100	Benjamin G. Humphreys	D	MS-3	March 4, 1903	Chairman: Territories (1913)
101	Ollie M. James	D	KY-1	March 4, 1903	Last term while serving in the House.
102	Moses P. Kinkaid	R	NE-6	March 4, 1903	
103	Daniel F. Lafean	R	PA-20	March 4, 1903	Last term while serving in the House until 64th Congress
104	George S. Legaré	D	SC-1	March 4, 1903	Died January 31, 1913, while still serving in the House.
105	Nicholas Longworth	R	OH-1	March 4, 1903	Last term while serving in the House until 64th Congress
106	George A. Loud	R	MI-10	March 4, 1903	Last term while serving in the House until 64th Congress
107	Robert B. Macon	D	AR-1	March 4, 1903	Last term while serving in the House
108	George D. McCreary	R	PA-6	March 4, 1903	Last term while serving in the House
109	Henry McMorran	R	MI-7	March 4, 1903	Last term while serving in the House
110	George W. Norris	R	NE-5	March 4, 1903	Last term while serving in the House
111	Robert N. Page	D	NC-7	March 4, 1903	
112	Arsène P. Pujo	D	LA-7	March 4, 1903	Chairman: Banking and Currency. Last term while serving in the House
113	Henry T. Rainey	D	IL-20	March 4, 1903	
114	Joseph T. Robinson	D	AR-6	March 4, 1903	Chairman: Public Lands. Resigned, to become Governor: January 14, 1913.
115	J. Swagar Sherley	D	KY-5	March 4, 1903	
116	William R. Smith	D	TX-16	March 4, 1903	Chairman: Irrigation of Arid Lands
117	Augustus O. Stanley	D	KY-2	March 4, 1903	
118	Halvor Steenerson	R	MN-9	March 4, 1903	
119	John A. Sterling	R	IL-17	March 4, 1903	Last term while serving in the House until 64th Congress
120	Andrew J. Volstead	R	MN-7	March 4, 1903	
121	Edwin Y. Webb	D	NC-9	March 4, 1903	
122	William W. Wilson	R	IL-3	March 4, 1903	Last term while serving in the House until 64th Congress
123	H. Olin Young	R	MI-12	March 4, 1903	
124	Victor Murdock	R	KS-8	May 26, 1903	
125	Reuben O. Moon	R	PA-4	November 3, 1903	Last term while serving in the House
126	J. Thomas Heflin	D	AL-5	May 19, 1904	Chairman: Industrial Arts and Expositions
127	Joseph R. Knowland	R	CA-3	November 8, 1904	
128	Ira W. Wood	R	NJ-4	November 8, 1904	Last term while serving in the House
Five non-consecutive terms
129	Daniel J. Riordan	D	NY-8	November 6, 1906	Previously served 1899–1901 while in the House.
Four consecutive terms
130	John E. Andrus	R	NY-19	March 4, 1905	Last term while serving in the House.
131	Andrew J. Barchfeld	R	PA-32	March 4, 1905	
132	Thomas M. Bell	D	GA-9	March 4, 1905	
133	James F. Burke	R	PA-31	March 4, 1905	
134	William M. Calder	R	NY-6	March 4, 1905	
135	Frank Clark	D	FL-2	March 4, 1905	
136	Lincoln Dixon	D	IN-4	March 4, 1905	
137	J. Edwin Ellerbe	D	SC-6	March 4, 1905	Last term while serving in the House.
138	John C. Floyd	D	AR-3	March 4, 1905	
139	Finis J. Garrett	D	TN-9	March 4, 1905	
140	Everis A. Hayes	R	CA-5	March 4, 1905	
141	William C. Houston	D	TN-5	March 4, 1905	Chairman: Census
142	Elbert H. Hubbard	R	IA-11	March 4, 1905	Died on June 4, 1912, while still serving in the House.
143	Gordon Lee	D	GA-7	March 4, 1905	
144	Martin B. Madden	R	IL-1	March 4, 1905	
145	William B. McKinley	R	IL-19	March 4, 1905	Last term while serving in the House until 64th Congress
146	Sylvester C. Smith	R	CA-8	March 4, 1905	Died on January 26, 1913, while still serving in the House.
147	Edward L. Taylor, Jr.	R	OH-12	March 4, 1905	Last term while serving in the House.
148	John T. Watkins	D	LA-4	March 4, 1905	Chairman: Revision of Laws
149	John W. Weeks	R	MA-12	March 4, 1905	
150	John M. Moore	D	TX-8	June 6, 1905	Last term while serving in the House.
151	Edwin W. Higgins	R	CT-3	October 2, 1905	Last term while serving in the House.
152	James McKinney	R	IL-14	November 7, 1905	Last term while serving in the House.
153	John M. Nelson	R	WI-2	September 4, 1906	
154	J. Hampton Moore	R	PA-3	November 6, 1906	
155	Edward W. Saunders	D	VA-5	November 6, 1906	
Four non-consecutive terms
156	Burton L. French	R	ID-al	March 4, 1911	Previously served 1903-09 while in the House.
157	Courtney W. Hamlin	D	MO-7	March 4, 1907	Previously served 1903-05 while in the House. Chairman: Expenditures in the State Department
158	Francis B. Harrison	D	NY-16	March 4, 1907	Previously served 1903-05 while in the House.
159	William Hughes	D	NJ-6	March 4, 1907	Previously served 1903-05 while in the House. Resigned on September 27, 1912, while still serving in the House.
160	Isaac R. Sherwood	D	OH-9	March 4, 1907	Previously served (R) 1873–75. Chairman: Invalid Pensions.
161	Frank E. Wilson	D	NY-4	March 4, 1911	Previously served 1899–1905 while in the House.
162	Charles F. Booher	D	MO-4	March 4, 1907	Previously served February 19-March 3, 1889 while in the House.
Three consecutive terms
163	John A. M. Adair	D	IN-8	March 4, 1907	
164	Joshua W. Alexander	D	MO-3	March 4, 1907	Chairman: Merchant Marine and Fisheries
165	Timothy T. Ansberry	D	OH-5	March 4, 1907	Chairman: Elections No. 1
166	William A. Ashbrook	D	OH-17	March 4, 1907	Chairman: Expenditures in the Post Office Department
167	William J. Cary	R	WI-4	March 4, 1907	
168	William E. Cox	D	IN-3	March 4, 1907	Chairman: Expenditures in the Treasury Department
169	William B. Cravens	D	AR-4	March 4, 1907	Last term while serving in the House until 73rd Congress
170	Matthew R. Denver	D	OH-6	March 4, 1907	Last term while serving in the House.
171	Charles G. Edwards	D	GA-1	March 4, 1907	
172	George W. Fairchild	R	NY-24	March 4, 1907	
173	Benjamin K. Focht	R	PA-17	March 4, 1907	Last term while serving in the House until 64th Congress
174	Charles V. Fornes	D	NY-11	March 4, 1907	Last term while serving in the House.
175	Martin D. Foster	D	IL-23	March 4, 1907	Chairman: Mines and Mining
176	Hannibal L. Godwin	D	NC-6	March 4, 1907	Chairman: Reform in the Civil Service
177	George W. Gordon	D	TN-10	March 4, 1907	Died on August 9, 1911, while still serving in the House.
178	James A. Hamill	D	NJ-10	March 4, 1907	Chairman: Elections No. 2
179	Winfield S. Hammond	D	MN-2	March 4, 1907	
180	Rufus Hardy	D	TX-6	March 4, 1907	Chairman: Expenditures in the Navy Department
181	Willis C. Hawley	R	OR-1	March 4, 1907	
182	Harvey Helm	D	KY-8	March 4, 1907	Chairman: Expenditures in the War Department
183	L. Paul Howland	R	OH-20	March 4, 1907	Last term while serving in the House.
184	Richmond P. Hobson	D	AL-6	March 4, 1907	
185	Cordell Hull	D	TN-4	March 4, 1907	
186	Ben Johnson	D	KY-4	March 4, 1907	Chairman: District of Columbia
187	Charles A. Kennedy	R	IA-1	March 4, 1907	
188	John W. Langley	R	KY-10	March 4, 1907	
189	Charles A. Lindbergh	R	MN-6	March 4, 1907	
190	Edmond H. Madison	R	KS-7	March 4, 1907	Died on September 18, 1911, while still serving in the House.
191	George R. Malby	R	NY-26	March 4, 1907	Died on July 5, 1912, while still serving in the House.
192	James T. McDermott	D	IL-4	March 4, 1907	
193	John G. McHenry	D	PA-16	March 4, 1907	Died on December 27, 1912, while still serving in the House.
194	James C. McLaughlin	R	MI-9	March 4, 1907	
195	Elmer A. Morse	R	WI-10	March 4, 1907	Last term while serving in the House.
196	Frank M. Nye	R	MN-5	March 4, 1907	Last term while serving in the House.
197	Andrew J. Peters	D	MA-11	March 4, 1907	
198	Charles N. Pray	R	MT-al	March 4, 1907	Last term while serving in the House.
199	George W. Rauch	D	IN-11	March 4, 1907	
200	John H. Rothermel	D	PA-13	March 4, 1907	Chairman: Expenditures in the Commerce and Labor Department
201	Adolph J. Sabath	D	IL-5	March 4, 1907	
202	William B. Wilson	D	PA-15	March 4, 1907	Chairman: Labor. Last term while serving in the House.
203	Daniel R. Anthony, Jr.	R	KS-1	May 23, 1907	
204	Charles C. Carlin	D	VA-8	November 5, 1907	
205	Joel Cook	R	PA-2	November 5, 1907	Died as Representative-elect December 15, 1910
206	Charles D. Carter	D	OK-4	November 16, 1907	
207	Scott Ferris	D	OK-5	November 16, 1907	Chairman: Public Lands (1913)
208	Bird S. McGuire	R	OK-1	November 16, 1907	Previously served as Delegate 1903-07 while in the House.
209	C. Bascom Slemp	R	VA-9	December 17, 1907	
210	Napoleon B. Thistlewood	R	IL-25	February 15, 1908	Last term while serving in the House.
211	Henry A. Barnhart	D	IN-13	November 3, 1908	
212	Albert Estopinal	D	LA-1	November 3, 1908	
213	Frank E. Guernsey	R	ME-4	November 3, 1908	
Three non-consecutive terms
214	James M. Gudger, Jr.	D	NC-10	March 4, 1911	Previously served 1903-07 while in the House.
Two consecutive terms
215	Carl C. Anderson	D	OH-13	March 4, 1909	Died on October 1, 1912, while still serving in the House.
216	Richard W. Austin	R	TN-2	March 4, 1909	
217	John W. Boehne	D	IN-1	March 4, 1909	Last term while serving in the House.
218	William P. Borland	D	MO-5	March 4, 1909	
219	Joseph W. Byrns	D	TN-6	March 4, 1909	
220	J. Campbell Cantrill	D	KY-7	March 4, 1909	
221	Cyrus Cline	D	IN-12	March 4, 1909	Chairman: Expenditures on Public Buildings
222	James W. Collier	D	MS-8	March 4, 1909	
223	Michael F. Conry	D	NY-12	March 4, 1909	
224	James H. Covington	D	MD-1	March 4, 1909	
225	James M. Cox	D	OH-3	March 4, 1909	Resigned to become Governor: January 12, 1913
226	William A. Cullop	D	IN-2	March 4, 1909	
227	S. Hubert Dent, Jr.	D	AL-2	March 4, 1909	
228	William A. Dickson	D	MS-7	March 4, 1909	Last term while serving in the House.
229	Martin Dies	D	TX-2	March 4, 1909	
230	Francis H. Dodds	R	MI-11	March 4, 1909	Last term while serving in the House.
231	Daniel A. Driscoll	D	NY-35	March 4, 1909	
232	Thomas Gallagher	D	IL-8	March 4, 1909	
233	James W. Good	R	IA-5	March 4, 1909	
234	James M. Graham	D	IL-21	March 4, 1909	Chairman: Expenditures in the Interior Department
235	William W. Griest	R	PA-9	March 4, 1909	
236	Louis B. Hanna	R	ND-1	March 4, 1909	Resigned to become Governor: January 7, 1913
237	William H. Heald	R	DE-al	March 4, 1909	Last term while serving in the House.
238	Dudley M. Hughes	D	GA-3	March 4, 1909	
239	Nathan E. Kendall	R	IA-6	March 4, 1909	Last term while serving in the House.
240	Eugene F. Kinkead	D	NJ-9	March 4, 1909	
241	Arthur W. Kopp	R	WI-3	March 4, 1909	Last term while serving in the House.
242	Charles A. Korbly	D	IN-7	March 4, 1909	Chairman: Railways and Canals
243	Jonathan N. Langham	R	PA-27	March 4, 1909	
244	James P. Latta	R	NE-3	March 4, 1909	Died on September 11, 1911, while still serving in the House.
245	Irvine L. Lenroot	R	WI-11	March 4, 1909	
246	John A. Maguire	D	NE-1	March 4, 1909	
247	John A. Martin	D	CO-2	March 4, 1909	Last term while serving in the House until 73rd Congress
248	Dannite H. Mays	D	FL-3	March 4, 1909	Last term while serving in the House.
249	Clarence B. Miller	R	MN-8	March 4, 1909	
250	Dick T. Morgan	R	OK-2	March 4, 1909	
251	Martin A. Morrison	D	IN-9	March 4, 1909	
252	Ralph W. Moss	D	IN-5	March 4, 1909	Chairman: Expenditures in the Agriculture Department
253	William A. Oldfield	D	AR-2	March 4, 1909	Chairman: Patents
254	A. Mitchell Palmer	D	PA-26	March 4, 1909	
255	Charles E. Pickett	R	IA-3	March 4, 1909	Last term while serving in the House.
256	Frank Plumley	R	VT-2	March 4, 1909	
257	Atterson W. Rucker	D	CO-1	March 4, 1909	Last term while serving in the House.
258	William G. Sharp	D	OH-14	March 4, 1909	
259	James S. Simmons	R	NY-34	March 4, 1909	Last term while serving in the House.
260	Thomas U. Sisson	D	MS-4	March 4, 1909	
261	Edward T. Taylor	D	CO-al	March 4, 1909	
262	Robert Y. Thomas, Jr.	D	KY-3	March 4, 1909	
263	John Q. Tilson	R	CT-al	March 4, 1909	Last term while serving in the House until 64th Congress
264	Robert C. Wickliffe	D	LA-6	March 4, 1909	Died on June 11, 1912, while still serving in the House.
265	Frank P. Woods	R	IA-10	March 4, 1909	
266	Clement C. Dickinson	D	MO-6	February 1, 1910	
267	Seaborn Roddenbery	D	GA-2	February 6, 1910	
268	Robert Turnbull	D	VA-4	March 8, 1910	Last term while serving in the House.
269	H. Garland Dupré	D	LA-2	November 8, 1910	
Two non-consecutive terms
270	Jefferson M. Levy	D	NY-13	March 4, 1911	Previously served 1899–1901 while in the House.
271	Joseph J. Russell	D	MO-14	March 4, 1911	Previously served 1907-09 while in the House.
272	James S. Davenport	D	OK-3	March 4, 1911	Previously served November 16, 1907–09 while in the House.
One term
273	Theron Akin	R	NY-25	March 4, 1911	Only term while serving in the House.
274	Alfred G. Allen	D	OH-2	March 4, 1911	
275	Sydney Anderson	R	MN-1	March 4, 1911	
276	Steven B. Ayres	Ind D	NY-18	March 4, 1911	Independent Democratic. Only term while serving in the House.
277	Elsworth R. Bathrick	D	OH-19	March 4, 1911	
278	Victor L. Berger	Soc	WI-5	March 4, 1911	Only term while serving in the House until 66th Congress
279	Fred L. Blackmon	D	AL-4	March 4, 1911	
280	Charles C. Bowman	R	PA-11	March 4, 1911	Only term while serving in the House. Seat declared vacant on December 12, 1912.
281	William G. Brown, Jr.	D	WV-2	March 4, 1911	
282	Frank Buchanan	D	IL-7	March 4, 1911	
283	Robert J. Bulkley	D	OH-21	March 4, 1911	
284	Michael E. Burke	D	WI-6	March 4, 1911	
285	James F. Byrnes	D	SC-2	March 4, 1911	
286	Oscar Callaway	D	TX-12	March 4, 1911	
287	Theron E. Catlin	R	MO-11	March 4, 1911	Unseated, after election challenge: August 12, 1912. Only term while serving in the House.
288	Horatio C. Claypool	D	OH-11	March 4, 1911	
289	Richard E. Connell	D	NY-21	March 4, 1911	Died on October 30, 1912, while still serving in the House.
290	Ira C. Copley	R	IL-11	March 4, 1911	
291	Thomas S. Crago	R	PA-23	March 4, 1911	Only term while serving in the House until 64th Congress
292	James M. Curley	D	MA-10	March 4, 1911	
293	Henry G. Danforth	R	NY-32	March 4, 1911	
294	James A. Daugherty	D	MO-15	March 4, 1911	Only term while serving in the House.
295	John W. Davis	D	WV-1	March 4, 1911	
296	Henry S. De Forest	R	NY-23	March 4, 1911	Only term while serving in the House.
297	Robert E. Difenderfer	D	PA-8	March 4, 1911	
298	Michael Donohoe	D	PA-5	March 4, 1911	
299	Frank E. Doremus	D	MI-1	March 4, 1911	
300	Robert L. Doughton	D	NC-8	March 4, 1911	
301	Leonidas C. Dyer	R	MO-12	March 4, 1911	
302	Lynden Evans	D	IL-9	March 4, 1911	Only term while serving in the House.
303	John M. Faison	D	NC-3	March 4, 1911	
304	John R. Farr	R	PA-10	March 4, 1911	
305	William J. Fields	D	KY-9	March 4, 1911	
306	H. Robert Fowler	D	IL-24	March 4, 1911	
307	William B. Francis	D	OH-16	March 4, 1911	
308	Henry George, Jr.	D	NY-17	March 4, 1911	
309	J. Henry Goeke	D	OH-4	March 4, 1911	
310	William S. Goodwin	D	AR-7	March 4, 1911	
311	Samuel W. Gould	D	ME-3	March 4, 1911	Only term while serving in the House.
312	Finly H. Gray	D	IN-6	March 4, 1911	
313	Curtis H. Gregg	D	PA-22	March 4, 1911	Only term while serving in the House.
314	John M. Hamilton	D	WV-4	March 4, 1911	Only term while serving in the House.
315	Robert O. Harris	R	MA-14	March 4, 1911	Only term while serving in the House.
316	Pat Harrison	D	MS-6	March 4, 1911	
317	Jesse l. Hartman	R	PA-19	March 4, 1911	Only term while serving in the House.
318	Henry T. Helgesen	R	ND-al	March 4, 1911	
319	Walter L. Hensley	D	MO-13	March 4, 1911	
320	Asher C. Hinds	R	ME-1	March 4, 1911	
321	Edward E. Holland	D	VA-2	March 4, 1911	
322	William S. Howard	D	GA-5	March 4, 1911	
323	Fred S. Jackson	R	KS-4	March 4, 1911	Only term while serving in the House.
324	Henderson M. Jacoway	D	AR-5	March 4, 1911	
325	William Kent	Prog R	CA-2	March 4, 1911	
326	John J. Kindred	D	NY-14	March 4, 1911	Only term while serving in the House until 67th Congress
327	George W. Kipp	R	PA-14	March 4, 1911	Died on July 24, 1911, while serving in the House.
328	George Konig	D	MD-3	March 4, 1911	
329	Thomas F. Konop	D	WI-9	March 4, 1911	
330	Walter Lafferty	R	OR-2	March 4, 1911	
331	William L. La Follette	R	WA-3	March 4, 1911	
332	Robert E. Lee	D	PA-12	March 4, 1911	Chairman: Mileage
333	David J. Lewis	D	MD-6	March 4, 1911	
334	J. Charles Linthicum	D	MD-4	March 4, 1911	
335	Adam B. Littlepage	D	WV-3	March 4, 1911	Only term while serving in the House until 64th Congress
336	Martin W. Littleton	D	NY-1	March 4, 1911	Only term while serving in the House.
337	Charles O. Lobeck	D	NE-2	March 4, 1911	
338	James P. Maher	D	NY-3	March 4, 1911	
339	Charles Matthews	R	PA-24	March 4, 1911	Only term while serving in the House.
340	Walter I. McCoy	D	NJ-8	March 4, 1911	
341	Daniel J. McGillicuddy	D	ME-2	March 4, 1911	
342	John C. McKenzie	R	IL-13	March 4, 1911	
343	Alexander C. Mitchell	R	KS-2	March 4, 1911	Died on July 7, 1911, while still serving in the House.
344	Luther W. Mott	R	NY-28	March 4, 1911	
345	William F. Murray	D	MA-9	March 4, 1911	
346	George F. O'Shaunessy	D	RI-1	March 4, 1911	
347	Thomas Parran, Sr.	R	MD-5	March 4, 1911	Only term while serving in the House.
348	Thomas G. Patten	D	NY-15	March 4, 1911	
349	Charles E. Patton	R	PA-21	March 4, 1911	
350	Irvin S. Pepper	D	IA-2	March 4, 1911	
351	Stephen G. Porter	R	PA-29	March 4, 1911	
352	James D. Post	D	OH-7	March 4, 1911	
353	Caleb Powers	R	KY-11	March 4, 1911	
354	Solomon F. Prouty	R	IA-7	March 4, 1911	
355	John E. Raker	D	CA-1	March 4, 1911	
356	William C. Redfield	D	NY-5	March 4, 1911	Only term while serving in the House.
357	Rollin R. Rees	R	KS-5	March 4, 1911	Only term while serving in the House.
358	Thomas L. Reilly	D	CT-2	March 4, 1911	
359	Edwin E. Roberts	R	NV-al	March 4, 1911	
360	Arthur B. Rouse	D	KY-6	March 4, 1911	
361	Thomas L. Rubey	D	MO-16	March 4, 1911	
362	Thomas J. Scully	D	NJ-3	March 4, 1911	
363	Sam R. Sells	R	TN-1	March 4, 1911	
364	Charles H. Sloan	R	NE-4	March 4, 1911	
365	Charles B. Smith	D	NY-36	March 4, 1911	
366	John M. C. Smith	R	MI-3	March 4, 1911	
367	Peter M. Speer	R	PA-28	March 4, 1911	Only term while serving in the House.
368	Edmund J. Stack	D	IL-6	March 4, 1911	Only term while serving in the House.
369	Charles M. Stedman	D	NC-5	March 4, 1911	
370	Hubert D. Stephens	D	MS-2	March 4, 1911	
371	William Stephens	R	CA-7	March 4, 1911	
372	Claude U. Stone	D	IL-16	March 4, 1911	
373	Edwin F. Sweet	D	MI-5	March 4, 1911	Only term while serving in the House.
374	Robert M. Switzer	R	OH-10	March 4, 1911	
375	Charles A. Talcott	D	NY-27	March 4, 1911	
376	John A. Thayer	D	MA-3	March 4, 1911	Only term while serving in the House.
377	Horace M. Towner	R	IA-8	March 4, 1911	
378	Edward W. Townsend	D	NJ-7	March 4, 1911	
379	Samuel J. Tribble	D	GA-8	March 4, 1911	
380	William E. Tuttle, Jr.	D	NJ-5	March 4, 1911	
381	Edwin S. Underhill	D	NY-33	March 4, 1911	
382	George H. Utter	R	RI-2	March 4, 1911	Died on November 3, 1912, while still serving in the House.
383	Stanton Warburton	R	WA-2	March 4, 1911	Only term while serving in the House.
384	William Wedemeyer	R	MI-2	March 4, 1911	Died on January 2, 1913, while still serving in the House.
385	John J. Whitacre	D	OH-18	March 4, 1911	
386	George White	D	OH-15	March 4, 1911	
387	William H. Wilder	R	MA-4	March 4, 1911	
388	Frank B. Willis	R	OH-8	March 4, 1911	
389	Samuel A. Witherspoon	D	MS-5	March 4, 1911	
390	Isaac D. Young	R	KS-6	March 4, 1911	Only term while serving in the House.
391	James Young	D	TX-3	March 4, 1911	
Members joining the House, after the start of the Congress
	William S. Reyburn	R	PA-2	May 23, 1911	Special election. Only term while serving in the House.
	William R. Green	R	IA-9	June 5, 1911	Special election
	William D. B. Ainey	R	PA-14	November 7, 1911	Special election
	William J. Browning	R	NJ-1	November 7, 1911	Special election
	Kenneth McKellar	D	TN-10	November 7, 1911	Special election
	Dan V. Stephens	D	NE-3	November 7, 1911	Special election
	Joseph Taggart	D	KS-2	November 7, 1911	Special election
392	George Curry	R	NM-al	January 8, 1912	Representative from new state. Only term while serving in the House.
393	Harvey B. Fergusson	D	NM-al	January 8, 1912	Previously served as Delegate 1897–99 while in the House. Representative from new state.
	George A. Neeley	D	KS-7	January 9, 1912	Special election
394	Carl T. Hayden	D	AZ-al	February 19, 1912	Representative from new state
	William S. Vare	R	PA-1	May 24, 1912	Special election
	Frank L. Greene	R	VT-1	July 30, 1912	Special election
	Patrick F. Gill	D	MO-11	August 12, 1912	Previously served 1909-11 while in the House. Seated, after election challenge: August 12, 1912. Last term.
	Archibald C. Hart	D	NJ-6	November 5, 1912	Special election
	Edwin A. Merritt	R	NY-26	November 5, 1912	Special election
	Lewis L. Morgan	D	LA-6	November 5, 1912	Special election
	George C. Scott	R	IA-11	November 5, 1912	Special election
	Samuel M. Taylor	D	AR-6	January 15, 1913	Special election
Non voting members
	Jonah K. Kalaniana'ole	R	HI-al	March 4, 1903	Territorial Delegate
	William Henry Andrews	R	NM-al	March 4, 1905	Territorial Delegate until state admitted: January 7, 1912
	Benito Legarda y Tuason	Ind	PI-al	November 22, 1907	Resident Commissioner
	Ralph Henry Cameron	R	AZ-al	March 4, 1909	Territorial Delegate until state admitted: February 18, 1912
	James Wickersham	R	AK-al	March 4, 1909	Territorial Delegate
	Manuel L. Quezón	N	PI-al	November 23, 1909	Resident Commissioner. Nationalist Party (PI).
	Luis Muñoz Rivera	U	PR-al	March 4, 1911	Resident Commissioner. Unionist Party (PR).

== See also ==
- 62nd United States Congress
- List of United States congressional districts
- List of United States senators in the 62nd Congress
