= Robert Struble =

Robert Struble may refer to:

- Bob Struble (1899–1967), political figure and social welfare reformer in Washington
- Robert Struble Jr. (1943–2016), schoolteacher, historian, author and associate editor at Catholic Lane
