= Dr. Francis B. Warnock House =

Historic house in Iowa, United States

- U.S. National Register of Historic Places
- Location within Iowa Location within the United States
- Location: 201 Maple St. Battle Creek, Iowa
- Coordinates: 42°18′57″N 95°36′02″W
- Area: less than one acre
- Built: 1899
- Built by: Thomas & Wm. Bassett
- Architect: George Franklin Barber
- Architectural style: Queen Anne; Colonial Revival
- NRHP reference No.: 88001945
- Added to NRHP: October 13, 1988

The Dr. Francis B. Warnock House is a historical building located in Battle Creek, Iowa, United States. Dr. Warnock was an Iowa native who received his degree from the University of Iowa in 1882. That same year he set up his practice in Battle Creek, and received his certificate from the State Board of Health in 1886. He bought the two lots the house sits on from his brother Samuel in 1883 and 1894. The design of the house reflects one of the mail order houses of George Franklin Barber. It was built by Ida Grove builders Thomas and William Bassett, and completed in 1899. The house is a 2½-story frame house that has a Sioux Falls red granite foundation. It is capped with a hip roof with three gabled sections. The Warnock house is an example of transitional residential architecture at the turn of the 20th-century that combines the Queen Anne and Colonial Revival styles. The Queen Anne influences include a round turret and a wraparound porch. The Colonial Revival elements include dentils, large Palladian windows, round porch columns, and Adamesque inspired ribbonwork. The house was listed on the National Register of Historic Places in 1988. It has been converted into a bed and breakfast known as the Inn at Battle Creek.
