= Ed H. Campbell =

American politician (1882–1969)

Ed Hoyt Campbell
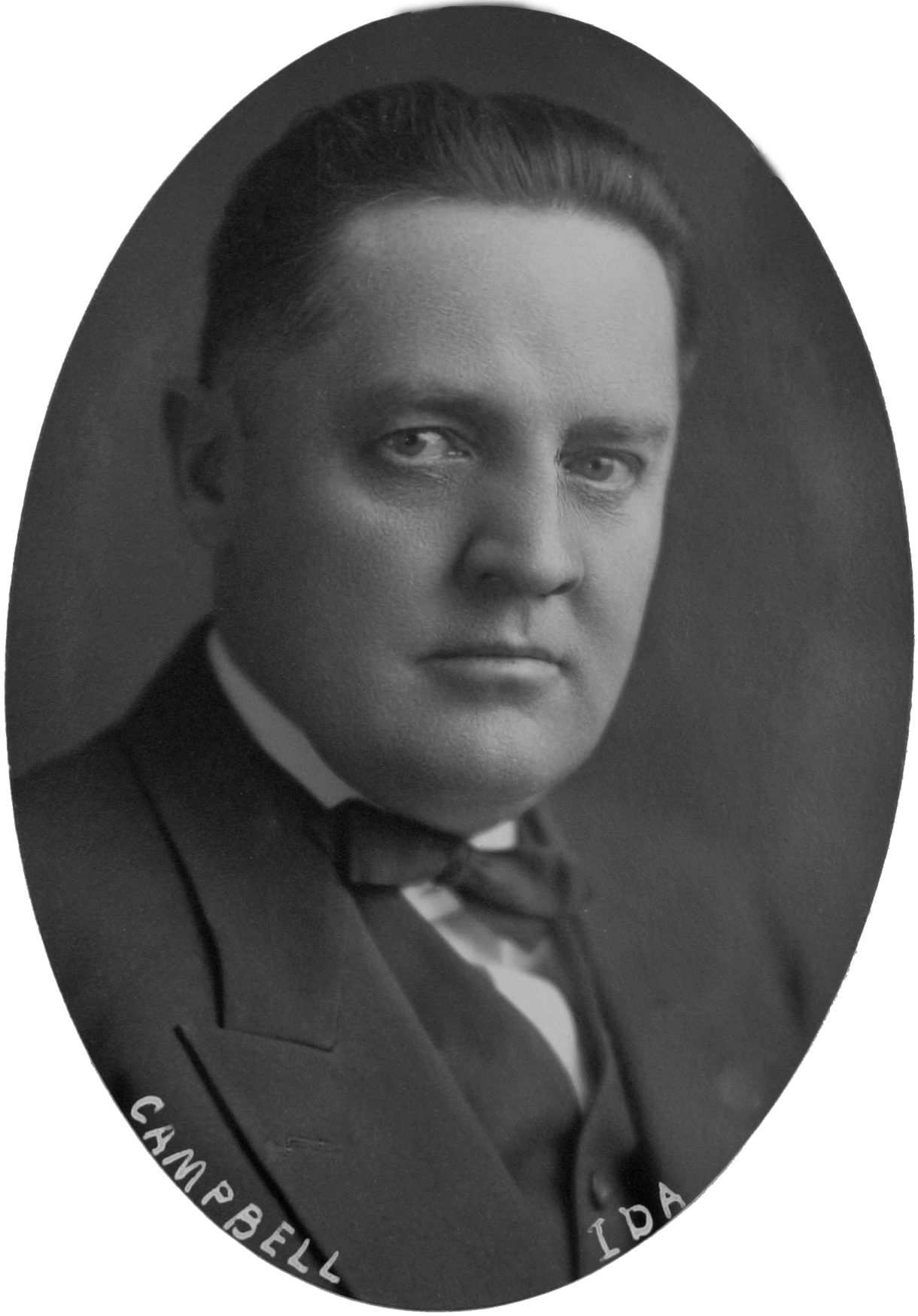
- From Campbell's 1927 Iowa Senate biography

Member of the U.S. House of Representatives from Iowa's 11th district
- In office March 4, 1929 – March 3, 1933
- Preceded by: William D. Boies
- Succeeded by: Guy M. Gillette (Redistricting)

Member of the Iowa Senate
- In office 1920-1928

Member of the Iowa House of Representatives
- In office 1911-1913

Personal details
- Born: March 6, 1882 Battle Creek, Iowa, U.S.
- Died: April 26, 1969 (aged 87) Battle Creek, Iowa, U.S.
- Resting place: Mount Hope Cemetery
- Party: Republican

Ed Hoyt Campbell (March 6, 1882 – April 26, 1969) was the last U.S. Representative from Iowa's 11th congressional district. When Iowa lost two seats in Congress due to the 1930 census, Campbell's district was renumbered but its boundaries were left intact. In the Roosevelt landslide of 1932, he was defeated for re-election.

Born in Battle Creek, Iowa, Campbell attended the public schools of his native city, and graduated from the University of Iowa College of Law in 1906. He was admitted to the bar the same year and commenced practice in Battle Creek. Two years later, he was elected as Mayor of Battle Creek, and served until 1911. That year, he was elected to the Iowa House of Representatives, where he served until 1913.

During the First World War Campbell served as a private in Company Six, First Officers Training School, at Fort Snelling, Minnesota.

Following his discharge, he was elected to the Iowa Senate in 1920. He served two four-year terms, serving as president pro tempore from 1924 to 1926.

In 1928, Campbell was elected as a Republican to the U.S. House of Representatives, to represent Iowa's 11th congressional district (in northwestern Iowa). He was re-elected two years later. Iowa lost two seats in Congress due to the 1930 census, which required the 1931 Iowa Legislature to reapportion the state's congressional districts for the first time in over four decades. However, the boundaries of the old 11th district were kept intact, and it was renumbered as the 9th district, leading commentators to predict that Campbell's seat was "apparently safe." In the next election (in 1932), Campbell won the Republican nomination for that seat, but faced maverick Democrat Guy M. Gillette in the general election. Franklin D. Roosevelt's landslide election also carried many Democrats to victory; Campbell was one of several incumbent Republican congressmen in Iowa who were unseated that year. In all, Campbell served in the Seventy-first and Seventy-second Congresses, from March 4, 1929, to March 3, 1933.

After returning to Iowa, Campbell resumed the practice of law. He died in Battle Creek on April 26, 1969, and was interred in Mount Hope Cemetery.

U.S. House of Representatives
Preceded by George C. Scott	Member of the U.S. House of Representatives from Iowa's 11th congressional district March 4, 1929 – March 3, 1933	Succeeded by District created
