= Iowa's 11th congressional district =

Former congressional district

- Obsolete district
- Created: 1880
- Eliminated: 1930
- Years active: 1883–1933

Iowa's 11th congressional district existed from 1883 to 1933, when Iowa sent eleven members of Congress to the United States House of Representatives. The district covered northwestern Iowa.

== Makeup ==
The district was created in 1881 (effective 1883) from a subset of the counties in the old 9th district. From 1883 to 1886, the district included Emmet, Palo Alto, Pocahontas, Calhoun, Greene, Carroll, Sac, Buena Vista, Clay, Dickinson, Osceola, O'Brien, Cherokee, Ida, Monona, Woodbury, Plymouth, Sioux, and Lyon counties. Reapportionment in 1886 reflected the increasing population balance between eastern and western Iowa, causing the district's size to shrink and resulting in a westward shift of its eastern boundary. No new counties were added, and Emmet, Palo Alto, Pocahontas, Calhoun, Greene, and Carroll counties were moved to the 10th district. After 1886, the boundaries of the district never changed; the Iowa General Assembly refused to reapportion its districts until the loss of two seats following the 1930 census left the State with no other choice.

== Demographics and underrepresentation ==
The district was predominantly rural, except for Sioux City, and included counties such as Lyon that were among the last in Iowa to settle. However, by 1895 the District had the second-largest population of any of Iowa's congressional districts, behind only the similarly oversized Tenth District. By 1890, the continued disproportionate increase in the population of the Tenth and Eleventh Districts caused some to predict that the General Assembly would need to reduce the area of each district, but no such change occurred. Meanwhile, between 1900 and 1920, the population of Sioux City more than doubled, exacerbating the problem of underrepresentation. By 1921, the Eleventh District was the most populous Iowa district, with 130,000 more residents than the First District, and over 80,000 more than the population of an ideally-sized Iowa congressional district.

== Voting patterns ==
All but one congressman elected from this district was a member of the Republican Party. The exception, Democrat Thomas J. Steele, was elected in 1914, when he upset George Cromwell Scott (who had barely campaigned that year). Scott recaptured his former seat from Steele at the first opportunity (two years later).

== After dissolution ==
Under the nine-district plan adopted by the Iowa General Assembly in 1931, the boundaries of the old 11th district were preserved as the new 9th district. However, the new 9th district was no longer safe for Republicans, and Democrats Guy M. Gillette and Vincent F. Harrington kept it in Democratic hands. Ten years later, when the 1940 census caused Iowa to lose another seat, the new 8th district included all of the old 11th district's counties, minus Monona County, which was Democratic-leaning in the 1930s. Republican Charles B. Hoeven won every election in the new 8th district (and one further election after a round of reapportionment in 1961 combined the 8th district and six more rural counties to form a new sixth district). Except for two Democrats who first won election in landslide years nationally for Democrats (Stanley L. Greigg in 1964 and Berkley Bedell in 1974), Republican congressmen have consistently represented most counties from the old 11th district since 1941.

== List of members representing the district ==
Member (District Residence (County))	Party	Years	Cong ress	Electoral history
District created March 4, 1883
Isaac S. Struble (Le Mars)	Republican	March 4, 1883 – March 3, 1891	48th 49th 50th 51st	Elected in 1882. Re-elected in 1884. Re-elected in 1886. Re-elected in 1888. Lost renomination.
George D. Perkins (Sioux City)	Republican	March 4, 1891 – March 3, 1899	52nd 53rd 54th 55th	Elected in 1890. Re-elected in 1892. Re-elected in 1894. Re-elected in 1896. Lost renomination.
Lot Thomas (Storm Lake)	Republican	March 4, 1899 – March 3, 1905	56th 57th 58th	Elected in 1898. Re-elected in 1900. Re-elected in 1902. Lost renomination.
Elbert H. Hubbard (Sioux City)	Republican	March 4, 1905 – June 4, 1912	59th 60th 61st 62nd	Elected in 1904. Re-elected in 1906. Re-elected in 1908. Re-elected in 1910. Died.
Vacant			62nd	
George Cromwell Scott (Sioux City)	Republican	November 5, 1912 – March 3, 1915	62nd 63rd	Elected to finish Hubbard's term. Re-elected in 1912. Lost re-election.
Thomas J. Steele (Sioux City)	Democratic	March 4, 1915 – March 3, 1917	64th	Elected in 1914. Lost re-election.
George Cromwell Scott (Sioux City)	Republican	March 4, 1917 – March 3, 1919	65th	Elected in 1916. Retired.
William D. Boies (Sheldon)	Republican	March 4, 1919 – March 3, 1929	66th 67th 68th 69th 70th	Elected in 1918. Re-elected in 1920. Re-elected in 1922. Re-elected in 1924. Re-elected in 1926. Retired.
Ed H. Campbell (Battle Creek)	Republican	March 4, 1929 – March 3, 1933	71st 72nd	Elected in 1928. Re-elected in 1930. Redistricted to the 9th district and lost re-election.
District eliminated March 4, 1933

== See also ==
- Iowa's congressional districts
