= George R. Struble =

American judge

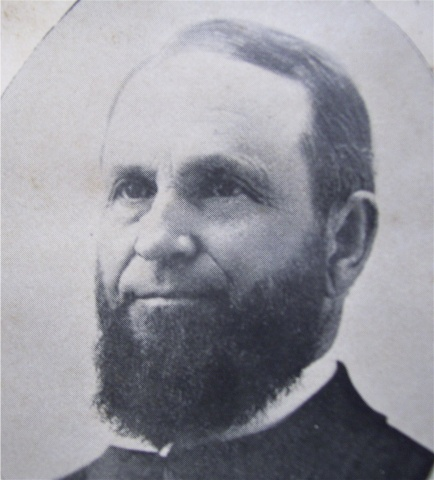
George R. Struble

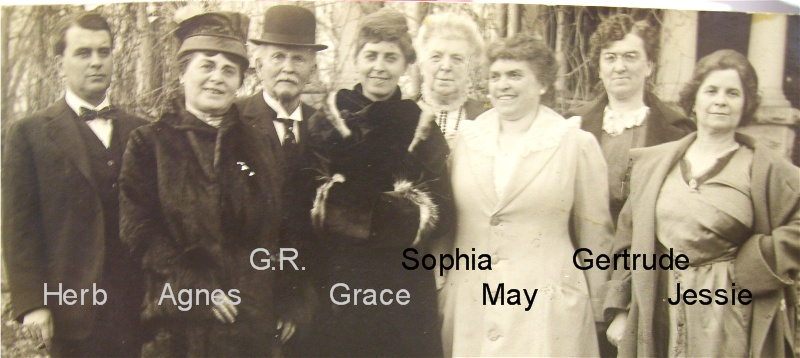
Judge G.R. Struble, wife Sophia, and their six children. Photo likely taken in April, 1910, on the occasion of the celebration in Toledo, IA of the couple's 50th wedding anniversary.

George Rix Struble (1836–1918) was a judge and politician from Toledo, Iowa.

== Biography ==
=== Early life and marriage ===
Struble was born on July 25, 1836, in Sussex County, New Jersey. His parents, Isaac and Emma (Cox) Struble, removed to Fredericksburg, Virginia, when he was quite young. They afterwards removed to Chesterville, Ohio, in 1847. In 1856, Mr. Struble came to Iowa, locating first at Iowa City and remaining there until the following spring. He then located in Toledo, Iowa, where on April 19, 1860, he was married to Miss Sophia J. Nelson.

=== Political and law career ===
Struble later entered a partnership with C.B. Bradshaw, M.M. Goodrich and L.G. Kinne, and formed the law firm of Struble & Stiger was formed in 1881, which continued as long as he remained in active practice.

From 1870 to 1872, he served acceptably on the circuit bench and in 1879 was elected to the General Assembly where he served two terms, the last term as speaker of the House of Representatives from 1881 to 1883. An ardent prohibitionist and prominent attorney, he was once described as "the pride of the Bar in this community and the admiration of the Court." Struble was one of 12 siblings including John T. Struble of Iowa City, and Congressman Isaac S. Struble of Plymouth County, Iowa. He was also the Granduncle of Bob Struble, Sr. and great-granduncle of Bob Struble, Jr.

=== Death and legacy ===
Struble died in his home in Toledo, Iowa, December 15, 1918. Upon his death, the state representative of Iowa called him a “affable and courteous” person and a “worthy and noble citizen”.
