= John T. Struble =

American judge

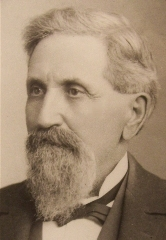
John T. Struble, c. 1901, Iowa City IA. Struble family photo.

John T. Struble (November 5, 1828 – November 27, 1916) was a builder and farmer during the formative years of the state of Iowa. He was an older brother of two prominent Iowa politicians: Congressman Isaac S. Struble and Speaker of the Iowa House of Representatives George R. Struble.

Except for any financial assistance to his brothers' political campaigns, and his own stint in Johnson County as justice of the peace, Struble was far more the businessman than the politician. His primary contribution as a pioneer of Iowa was to the state's developing economy. Upon his death in 1916, the Iowa City Daily Press described John T. Struble as a "pioneer loved by all." "Helps build Iowa City," read one of the article's headings.

== Ancestry ==
John T. Struble's great-grandfather, Dietrich Struble (1714–1807), was the progenitor of the Struble family in America. After Dietrich and his wife Elizabeth emigrated from Albig bei Alzey, Germany they tarried for a time in the Netherlands until arranging a relationship of indentured servitude with William Allen (loyalist) of Allentown PA fame. Allen paid the family's passage on the ship, Edinburgh, which landed at Philadelphia in 1748. After working as a stonemason to pay off his indentured debt, Dietrich moved to German Valley, New Jersey (now Long Valley). There he purchased over time from Allen a 310-acre (1.3 km^{2}) farm where he and Elizabeth raised their large family. About 1777, however, in order to escape their predominantly loyalist neighbors and more safely support the American Revolution, the Strubles sold the farm and moved some 30 miles (48 km) north to Sussex County, NJ.

The Struble children numbered ten sons, of which nine lived to adulthood and married. From this patriarchate, most Strubles in the United States trace their lineage. One of Dietrich's boys, Daniel, served under General Washington at Morristown. Another, John (who is alleged by one biographer to have been born during the Atlantic voyage), begot Isaac Struble, and it was he, Isaac the Elder (1801–1891), who led his family on a migration in stages – to more than one location in Virginia (including the future state of West Virginia) beginning in 1839, thence to Knox County, Ohio in 1846, and in 1857 (though with John T. blazing the trail in 1852) to Johnson County, Iowa. Three of Isaac's twelve children (John T., George R. & Isaac the Younger) were destined to play important roles in the early polity and economy of Iowa.

== Early life and career ==
Isaac the Elder's first wife, Sarah (Atkinson) Struble, gave birth to John T. in Sussex County, New Jersey, on November 5, 1828. She died when John T. was about the age of four, but after a period of a year or two Isaac remarried, and Emma Teasdale raised Sarah's four children and gave birth to eight more of her own. By March, 1852, John T. had left the family fold for Iowa City, to be joined there five years later by his parents and several of the children.

The Iowa City area - mostly the western part of Scott Township in Johnson County - remained John T.'s home from about the age of 24 until his death in his 89th year. Soon after arriving in Iowa City, John met Virginia Snyder, daughter of William B. Snyder, a prominent settler and architect who oversaw construction of the original state house when Iowa City was still the capitol. John and Jenny married on September 28, 1854.

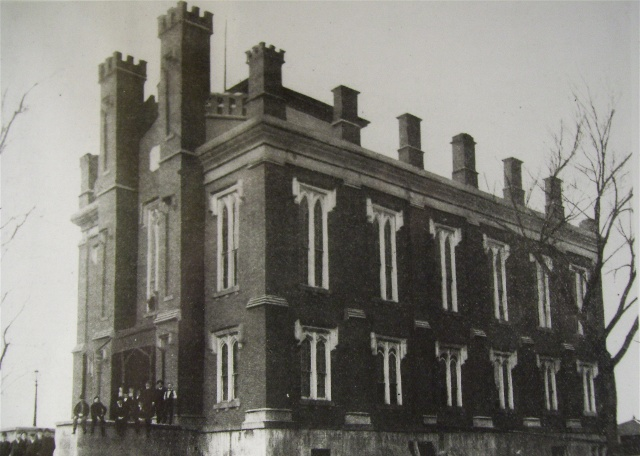
Old Johnson County Courthouse, Iowa City, 1857-1899

John T. pursued two careers. At first he was a builder but after more than a decade in that profession he began the transition to full-time farmer. During his 20s and early 30s, his main line of work was as a building and bricklaying contractor. Among the various projects where he left his mark were St. Mary's Catholic and the Congregational Churches, both located in central Iowa City near the U of I campus and still in use as of Summer, 2007. Published obituaries and earlier sources report that Struble won the contract to build the 19th century court house of Johnson County (see photo); also that he built or helped build St. Agatha's Catholic seminary (1861), now refurbished as the Berkley apartment building, 130 Jefferson. "He also designed Iowa City's first hostelry, the old Truesdell hotel, long afterwards metamorphosed into the Thomas Brennan home."

== Woodlawn Home ==
In 1856 John T. purchased a landholding in Scott township, some three miles (5 km) east of Iowa City. The pedigreed horses he bred were for many years the highlight of his farming/ranching initiatives. The Strubles named the family homestead "Woodlawn Home," and John T. lived on that farm for the remaining 60 years of his life. John and Jenny had eight children, three girls and five boys including George M. Struble, father of Bob Struble. John T. was active in fraternal circles, and was one of the founders of the local Eureka Lodge, I.O.O.F.

John T. Struble was in relatively good health until his death less than 19 weeks before the U.S. entry into World War I. Despite a series of strokes over the previous eleven years, his obituary states that on the preceding Sunday, "Mr. Struble, who was ever a devout follower of the Lord, attended church in Iowa city, and his many friends who then met him at the Presbyterian church congratulated him upon the fine preservation of health and strength, despite his nearly 90 years." His passing followed a sudden heart attack at home, November 27, 1916. Jenny, his widow, Sarah Elize Virginia (Snyder) Struble, died 14 years later in her 95th year.

The Iowa City Daily Citizen described John T.'s funeral. "Funeral services for the late John T. Struble, who died Monday evening, were held this morning at 10 o'clock from the family home in Scott township, with Rev. Harry B. Boyd officiating. Interment was made in Oakland cemetery. The service was attended by many Iowa City people, including the members of Eureka lodge of the order of Odd Fellows, of which he was a charter member. The Odd Fellows were in charge of the ceremony at the grave."

The front page of the Iowa City Daily Press included the following tribute: "He was a man of many fine attributes. No citizen has been held in sincerer regard by the community; no father has been more loving; no husband more devoted in all the long years of his residence in this county. A great circle of friends will remember him."...

== Sources ==
Early Germans of New Jersey, pp. 508–509; History of Johnson County, p. 932; "Sudden Death Calls Pioneer Loved By All," Iowa City Daily Press (Iowa City IA, 11/28/1916), p. 1; "John T. Struble, Iowa City Pioneer, Died Last Evening," Iowa City Daily Citizen, Iowa City, 11/28/1916; "A Fact a Day About Iowa City," a newspaper column which appeared from 1927-1946 in the Iowa City Press Citizen, clipping dated 1935; research and correspondence conducted by two of John T.'s granddaughters, the late Lois (Struble) Lawson of Spokane WA and Virginia (Struble) Burlingame of Bozeman MT. In the above photo John was his early seventies. First two photos; also on site research assistance to Bob Struble, Jr., great-grandson of John T.; from the State Historical Society of Iowa, Iowa City Branch. Also helpful leads, advice and access to his private library courtesy of well-known Iowa City historian, Bob Hibbs.

== Endnotes ==
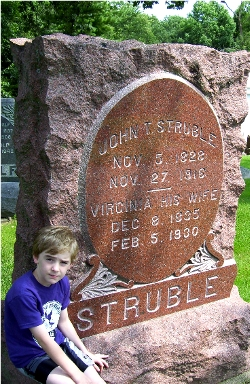
Michael Struble at the gravesite of his great-great grandparents, Virginia and John T. Struble, Summer 2007
