= William D. Boies =

American politician (1857–1932)

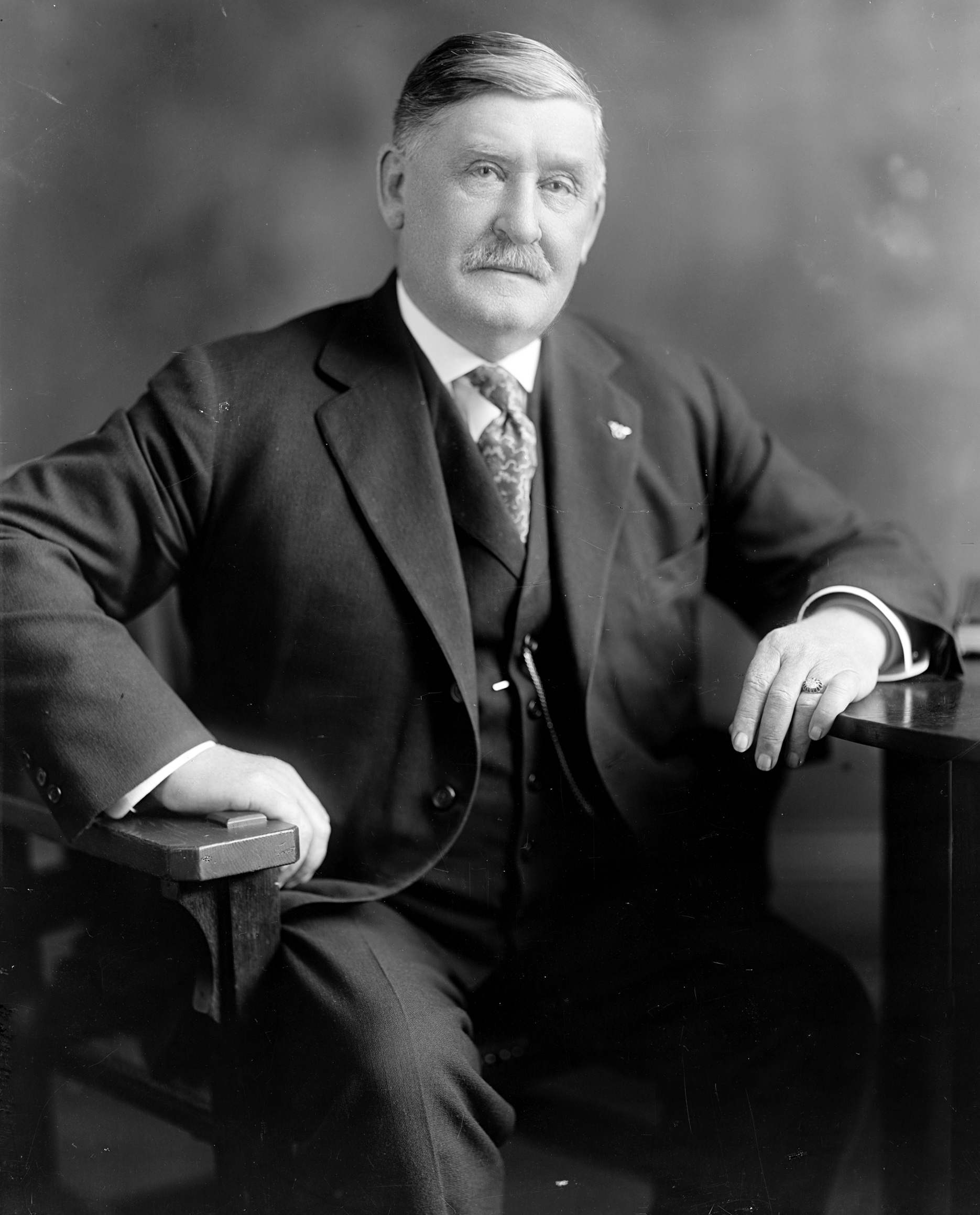

Member of the U.S. House of Representatives from Iowa's 11th district
- In office March 4, 1919 – March 3, 1929
- Preceded by: George Cromwell Scott
- Succeeded by: Ed H. Campbell

Personal details
- Born: January 3, 1857 Boone County, Illinois
- Died: May 31, 1932 (aged 75) Sheldon, Iowa
- Party: Republican
- Profession: Lawyer

William Dayton Boies (January 3, 1857 – May 31, 1932) was a lawyer, trial-court judge and five-term Republican U.S. Representative from Iowa's 11th congressional district in northwestern Iowa.

Born on a farm in Boone County, Illinois, Boies attended country schools and the public schools of Belvidere, Illinois. He moved with his parents to Buchanan County, Iowa, in 1873 and settled near the town of Quasqueton. He was graduated in law from the University of Iowa College of Law at Iowa City in 1880. He was admitted to the bar in 1881 and commenced practice in Sanborn, in O'Brien County, Iowa. He moved to nearby Sheldon, Iowa, in 1887, where he continued the practice of law.

Boies was an unsuccessful candidate for election as judge of the district court in 1890. He served as member of the school board of the independent school district of Sheldon from 1900 to 1912. He was appointed judge of the district court of the fourth judicial district of Iowa on January 1, 1913. On a division of this district, he became judge of the twenty-first judicial district, and in 1914 was elected for a term of four years.

On March 31, 1918, Boies resigned as judge to become a candidate for the Republican nomination to represent Iowa's 11th congressional district in the U.S. House. The incumbent, George Cromwell Scott, had chosen not to seek re-election. Boies won the Republican nomination (defeating two opponents), and then the seat (defeating former Congressman Thomas J. Steele), becoming a member of the Sixty-sixth Congress.

Boies was re-elected to Congress four times, and never defeated. He was one of the managers appointed by the House in 1926 to conduct the impeachment proceedings against George W. English, judge of the United States District Court for the Eastern District of Illinois.

He was not a candidate for renomination in 1928. In all, he served from March 4, 1919 to March 3, 1929. He died in Sheldon, Iowa on May 31, 1932. He was interred in Eastlawn Cemetery.

U.S. House of Representatives
| Preceded by George Cromwell Scott | Member of the U.S. House of Representatives from Iowa's 11th congressional district March 4, 1919 – March 3, 1929 | Succeeded by Ed H. Campbell |
