= List of United States senators in the 62nd Congress =

This is a complete list of United States senators during the 62nd United States Congress listed by seniority from March 4, 1911, to March 3, 1913.

Order of service is based on the commencement of the senator's first term. Behind this is former service as a senator (only giving the senator seniority within their new incoming class), service as vice president, a House member, a cabinet secretary, or a governor of a state. The final factor is the population of the senator's state.

Senators who were sworn in during the middle of the Congress (up until the last senator who was not sworn in early after winning the November 1912 election) are listed at the end of the list with no number.

== Terms of service ==
Class	Terms of service of senators that expired in years
Class 2	Terms of service of senators that expired in 1913 (AL, AR, CO, DE, GA, IA, ID, IL, KS, KY, LA, MA, ME, MI, MN, MS, MT, NC, NE, NH, NJ, NM, OK, OR, RI, SC, SD, TN, TX, VA, WV, and WY.)
Class 3	Terms of service of senators that expired in 1915 (AL, AR, AZ, CA, CO, CT, FL, GA, ID, IL, IN, IA, KS, KY, LA, MD, MO, NC, ND, NH, NV, NY, OH, OK, OR, PA, SC, SD, UT, VT, WA, and WI.)
Class 1	Terms of service of senators that expired in 1917 (AZ, CA, CT, DE, FL, IN, MA, MD, ME, MI, MN, MO, MS, MT, ND, NE, NJ, NM, NV, NY, OH, PA, RI, TN, TX, UT, VA, VT, WA, WI, WV, and WY.)

== U.S. Senate seniority list ==
U.S. Senate seniority
Rank	Senator (party-state)	Seniority date	Other factors
1	William P. Frye (R-ME)	March 18, 1881	
2	Shelby Moore Cullom (R-IL)	March 4, 1883	
3	Jacob H. Gallinger (R-NH)	March 4, 1891	
4	Henry Cabot Lodge (R-MA)	March 4, 1893	
5	George C. Perkins (R-CA)	July 26, 1893	
6	Clarence D. Clark (R-WY)	January 24, 1895	
7	Francis E. Warren (R-WY)	March 4, 1895	Previously a senator
8	Knute Nelson (R-MN)	March 4, 1895	Former governor, Minnesota 20th in population (1890)
9	Benjamin Tillman (D-SC)	March 4, 1895	Former governor, South Carolina 23rd in population (1890)
10	Augustus O. Bacon (D-GA)	March 4, 1895	Georgia 12th in population (1890)
11	Thomas S. Martin (D-VA)	March 4, 1895	Virginia 15th in population (1890)
12	Boies Penrose (R-PA)	March 4, 1897	
13	Charles A. Culberson (R-TX)	March 4, 1899	Former governor
14	Porter McCumber (R-ND)	March 4, 1899	
15	William P. Dillingham (R-VT)	October 18, 1900	
16	Moses Clapp (R-MN)	January 23, 1901	
17	Joseph W. Bailey (D-TX)	March 4, 1901	Former representative (10 years)
18	Robert J. Gamble (R-SD)	March 4, 1901	Former representative (4 years)
19	Furnifold M. Simmons (D-NC)	March 4, 1901	Former representative (2 years)
20	Murphy J. Foster (D-LA)	March 4, 1901	Former governor
21	Henry E. Burnham (R-NH)	March 4, 1901	
22	Francis Newlands (D-NV)	March 4, 1903	Former representative
23	William J. Stone (D-MO)	March 4, 1903	Former governor, Missouri 5th in population (1900)
24	James P. Clarke (D-AR)	March 4, 1903	Former governor, Arkansas 25th in population (1900)
25	Lee S. Overman (D-NC)	March 4, 1903	North Carolina 15th in population (1900)
26	Reed Smoot (R-UT)	March 4, 1903	Utah 41st in population (1900)
27	Weldon B. Heyburn (R-ID)	March 4, 1903	Idaho 44th in population (1900)
28	Winthrop M. Crane (R-MA)	October 12, 1904	
29	Isidor Rayner (D-MD)	March 4, 1905	Former representative (6 years)
30	George Sutherland (R-UT)	March 4, 1905	Former representative (2 years)
31	George S. Nixon (R-NV)	March 4, 1905	
32	Frank B. Brandegee (R-CT)	May 10, 1905	
33	Robert M. La Follette, Sr. (R-WI)	January 4, 1906	
34	Henry du Pont (R-DE)	June 13, 1906	
35	Charles Curtis (R-KS)	January 29, 1907	
36	William A. Smith (R-MI)	February 9, 1907	
37	Robert Love Taylor (D-TN)	March 4, 1907	Former representative (12 years)
38	Thomas H. Paynter (D-KY)	March 4, 1907	Former representative (6 years)
39	Joseph M. Dixon (R-MT)	March 4, 1907	Former representative (4 years)
40	Jeff Davis (D-AR)	March 4, 1907	Former governor
41	Frank O. Briggs (R-NJ)	March 4, 1907	New Jersey 16th in population (1900)
42	Norris Brown (R-NE)	March 4, 1907	Nebraska 27th in population (1900)
43	Simon Guggenheim (R-CO)	March 4, 1907	Colorado 32nd in population (1900)
44	Jonathan Bourne, Jr. (R-OR)	March 4, 1907	Oregon 36th in population (1900)
45	Harry A. Richardson (R-DE)	March 4, 1907	Delaware 43rd in population (1900)
46	William Borah (R-ID)	March 4, 1907	Idaho 44th in population (1900)
47	Isaac Stephenson (R-WI)	May 17, 1907	
48	John H. Bankhead (D-AL)	June 18, 1907	
49	Joseph F. Johnston (D-AL)	August 6, 1907	
50	Thomas Gore (D-OK)	December 11, 1907	"G" 7th in alphabet
51	Robert Owen (D-OK)	December 11, 1907	"O" 15th in alphabet
52	George P. Wetmore (D-RI)	January 22, 1908	
53	John Walter Smith (D-MD)	March 25, 1908	
54	Carroll S. Page (R-VT)	October 21, 1908	
55	Albert B. Cummins (R-IA)	November 24, 1908	
56	Theodore E. Burton (R-OH)	March 4, 1909	Former representative (16 years)
57	Wesley Jones (R-WA)	March 4, 1909	Former representative (10 years)
58	Benjamin Shively (D-IN)	March 4, 1909	Former representative (7 years)
59	Elihu Root (R-NY)	March 4, 1909	Former cabinet member
60	William O. Bradley (R-KY)	March 4, 1909	Former governor, Kentucky 12th in population (1900)
61	Coe Crawford (R-SD)	March 4, 1909	Former governor, South Dakota 38th in population (1900)
62	Joseph Bristow (R-KS)	March 4, 1909	Kansas 22nd in population (1900)
63	Ellison D. Smith (D-SC)	March 4, 1909	South Carolina 24th in population (1900)
64	Duncan U. Fletcher (D-FL)	March 4, 1909	Florida 33rd in population (1900)
65	George Chamberlain (D-OR)	March 4, 1909	Oregon 36th in population (1900)
66	George T. Oliver (R-PA)	March 17, 1909	
67	William Lorimer (D-IL)	June 18, 1909	
68	LeRoy Percy (D-MS)	February 23, 1910	
69	Claude A. Swanson (D-VA)	August 1, 1910	
70	Lafayette Young (R-IA)	November 12, 1910	
71	Joseph M. Terrell (D-GA)	November 17, 1910	
72	John Thornton (D-LA)	December 7, 1910	
73	Asle Gronna (R-ND)	February 2, 1911	Former representative
74	Clarence W. Watson (D-WV)	February 2, 1911	
75	John S. Williams (D-MS)	March 4, 1911	Former representative (16 years)
76	Charles Townsend (R-MI)	March 4, 1911	Former representative (8 years)
77	Gilbert Hitchcock (D-NE)	March 4, 1911	Former representative (6 years)
78	Miles Poindexter (R-WA)	March 4, 1911	Former representative (2 years)
79	George P. McLean (R-CT)	March 4, 1911	Former governor
80	Atlee Pomerene (D-OH)	March 4, 1911	Ohio 4th in population (1910)
81	James A. Reed (D-MO)	March 4, 1911	Missouri 7th in population (1910)
82	John W. Kern (D-IN)	March 4, 1911	Indiana 9th in population (1910)
83	James E. Martine (D-NJ)	March 4, 1911	New Jersey 11th in population (1910)
84	John D. Works (R-CA)	March 4, 1911	California 12th in population (1910)
85	Luke Lea (D-TN)	March 4, 1911	Tennessee 17th in population (1910)
86	William E. Chilton (D-WV)	March 4, 1911	West Virginia 28th in population (1910)
87	Nathan Bryan (D-FL)	March 4, 1911	Florida 33rd in population (1910)
88	Charles F. Johnson (D-ME)	March 4, 1911	Maine 34th in population (1910)
89	Henry F. Lippitt (R-RI)	March 4, 1911	Rhode Island 38th in population (1910)
90	Henry L. Myers (D-MT)	March 4, 1911	Montana 40th in population (1910)
91	James O'Gorman (D-NY)	March 31, 1911	
	William S. Kenyon (R-IA)	April 12, 1911	
	Obadiah Gardner (D-ME)	September 23, 1911	
	Hoke Smith (D-GA)	November 16, 1911	
92	Thomas B. Catron (R-NM)	April 2, 1912	Former delegate, New Mexico 43rd in population (1910)
93	Marcus A. Smith (D-AZ)	April 2, 1912	Former delegate, Arizona 45th in population (1910)
94	Albert B. Fall (R-NM)	April 2, 1912	New Mexico 43rd in population (1910)
95	Henry F. Ashurst (D-AZ)	April 2, 1912	Arizona 45th in population (1910)
	Newell Sanders (R-TN)	April 8, 1912	
	William Massey (R-NV)	July 1, 1912	
	Kirtland Perky (D-ID)	November 18, 1912	
	William P. Jackson (R-MD)	November 29, 1912	
	Rienzi Johnston (D-TX)	January 4, 1913	
	John N. Heiskell (D-AR)	January 6, 1913	
96	Charles Thomas (D-CO)	January 15, 1913	
	James Brady (D-ID)	January 24, 1913	
	William Webb (D-TN)	January 24, 1913	
	William M. Kavanaugh (D-AR)	January 29, 1913	Arkansas 25th in population (1910)
	Key Pittman (D-NV)	January 29, 1913	Nevada 48th in population (1910)
	Morris Sheppard (D-TX)	February 3, 1913	

== See also ==
- 62nd United States Congress
- List of United States representatives in the 62nd Congress
