= Lot Thomas =

American politician

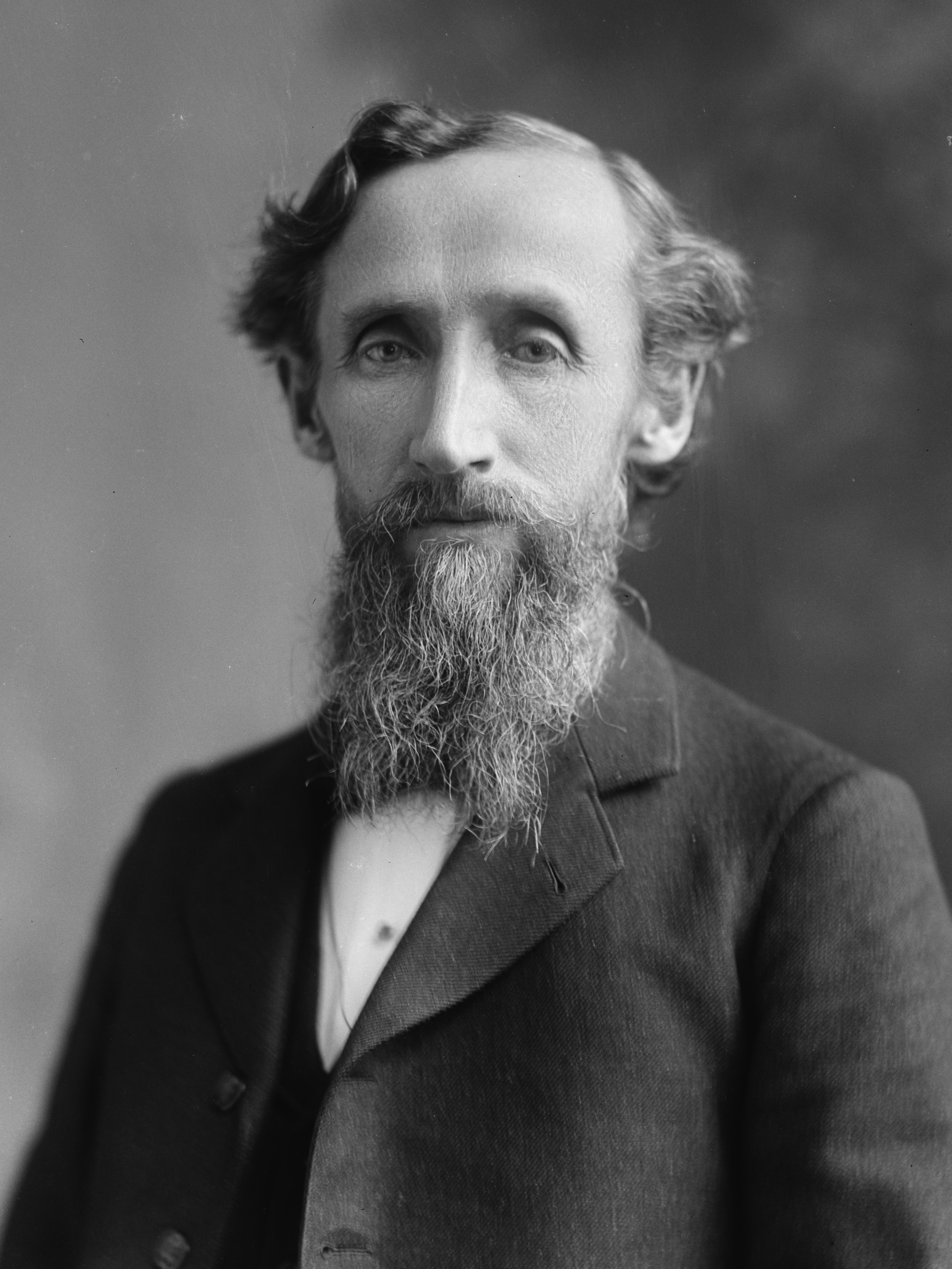
- Thomas c. 1894–1901

Member of the U.S. House of Representatives from Iowa's 11th district
- In office March 4, 1899 – March 3, 1905
- Preceded by: George D. Perkins
- Succeeded by: Elbert H. Hubbard

Personal details
- Born: October 17, 1843 Markleysburg, Pennsylvania
- Died: March 17, 1905 (aged 61) Yuma, Arizona
- Party: Republican
- Education: Vermillion Institute; University of Iowa College of Law
- Occupation: Attorney; Judge

Lot Thomas (October 17, 1843 – March 17, 1905) was a state-court judge who also served three terms as a Republican U.S. Representative from Iowa's now-obsolete 11th congressional district, in northwestern Iowa.

Born on a farm near Markleysburg, Pennsylvania to Christian and Susan Fike Thomas, Lot Thomas attended the public schools in Pennsylvania, then Vermillion Institute in Hayesville, Ohio. He moved to Iowa in 1868. After teaching school in New Virginia, in Warren County, he attended the University of Iowa College of Law. He was admitted to the bar in 1870. That year he moved to Sioux Rapids in Buena Vista County, Iowa, where he started his law practice. When the county seat was moved to Storm Lake, Thomas also moved there.

He was Buena Vista County Attorney from 1872 to 1885. From 1885 until 1898, he served as judge of the fourteenth judicial district of Iowa (which included Buena Vista, Palo Alto, Pocahontas, Dickinson, Emmett, Kossuth, Humboldt, and Clay Counties).

In February 1898, Thomas challenged incumbent Republican Congressman George D. Perkins for the Republican nomination for the 11th congressional district seat held by Perkins since 1891. After defeating Perkins for the nomination on the 217th ballot, he resigned his judgeship effective August 16, 1898. Thomas won the general election, and in 1899 became a member of the Fifty-sixth Congress. He was re-elected twice, and served in the Fifty-seventh, and Fifty-eighth Congresses.

Thomas' service in Congress coincided with a worsening of factionalism within the Iowa Republican Party, with an "insurgent" contingent loyal to the career and platform of Des Moines attorney (and later Governor and U.S. Senator) Albert B. Cummins, and another "stand-patter" faction hostile toward Cummins. Thomas was considered a leader in the pro-Cummins faction. He also served on the House Committee on the Judiciary.

He tried and failed to win renominated by his party in 1904. In all, Thomas served in Congress from March 4, 1899, to March 3, 1905.

Thomas lived only two weeks following the end of his congressional service. In poor health and in search of a more hospitable setting, died on a train near Yuma, Arizona on March 17, 1905, while en route to Los Angeles, California. He was interred in Storm Lake Cemetery.

U.S. House of Representatives
Preceded by George D. Perkins	Member of the U.S. House of Representatives from Iowa's 11th congressional district 1899–1905	Succeeded by Elbert H. Hubbard
