= George D. Perkins =

American politician (1840–1914)

George Douglas Perkins
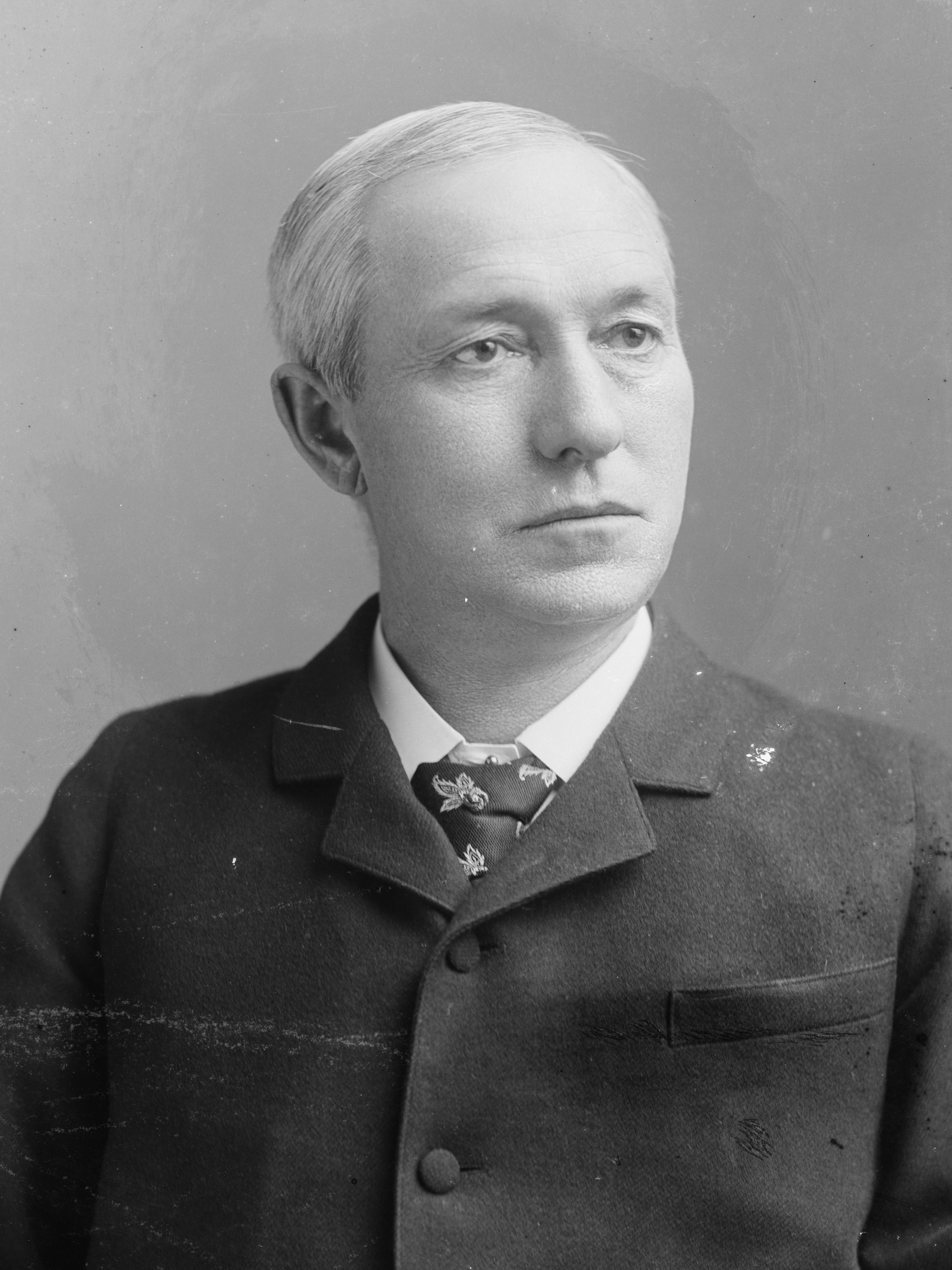
- Perkins c. 1891–1894

Member of the U.S. House of Representatives from Iowa's 11th district
- In office March 4, 1891 – March 3, 1899
- Preceded by: Isaac S. Struble
- Succeeded by: Lot Thomas

Member of the Iowa Senate
- In office 1874-1876

Personal details
- Born: February 29, 1840 Holley, New York
- Died: February 3, 1914 (aged 73) Sioux City, Iowa
- Resting place: Floyd Cemetery in Sioux City, Iowa
- Party: Republican
- Occupation: Newspaper publisher

Military service
- Branch/service: United States Army
- Battles/wars: American Civil War

George Douglas Perkins (February 29, 1840 – February 3, 1914) was a newspaper editor, Republican U.S. Representative from Iowa's 11th congressional district, and a candidate for his party's nomination as governor.

He was born in Holley, New York, the son of John Dyer Perkins and Lucy Forsyth. John Dyer Perkins was a Presidential elector from Orleans County, New York, in 1844. John Dyer Perkins was also the brother of Elizabeth Rogers Perkins Humphrey, the great-grandmother of Humphrey Bogart, the actor.

In 1860, he established the Cedar Falls Gazette in Cedar Falls, Iowa. On August 12, 1862, after the outbreak of the American Civil War, he enlisted as a private in Company B of the 31st Iowa Volunteer Infantry Regiment. His military service ended seven months later on January 12, 1863, when he returned to The Gazette. After 1866, he moved to Chicago, Illinois, and was engaged as agent of the Northwestern Associated Press until 1869. He moved to Sioux City, Iowa, having become engaged in Chicago to Louise Julien, daughter of diamond jeweler Narcissus Julien, and in 1869 became editor and publisher of the Sioux City Journal.

He was elected to one term in the Iowa State Senate, having served from 1874 to 1876. He served from 1880 to 1882 as Iowa's commissioner of immigration. On January 29, 1883, U.S. President Chester A. Arthur named Perkins as the United States marshal for the Northern District of Iowa. In 1885, he was removed by the Democratic President Grover Cleveland.

In 1890, Perkins was one of three major candidates who challenged incumbent 11th district Congressman Isaac S. Struble for the Republican nomination. At the district convention, Struble consistently outpolled the other three until, on the 43rd ballot, his opponents united behind Perkins and hence gave Perkins the nomination. In the worst midterm election for Republican candidates since the Civil War, Perkins was still elected in November 1890 to the 52nd United States Congress, the one known as "the billion dollar Congress." He was re-elected to the three succeeding Congresses. In 1894, he was one of seven Republican candidates for the U.S. Senate seat vacated by the retirement of James F. Wilson, the winner was John H. Gear. In February 1898, Lot Thomas, a state court judge, challenged Perkins for the Republican nomination to the district nominating convention on the 217th ballot. In all, Perkins served in Congress from March 4, 1891, to March 3, 1899.

George Douglas Perkins Statesman Publisher of a statement essay by Red Cloud in the editorial section of the Sioux City Journal along with the anniversary articles of the papers' founding with the founders' photos. Perkins returned to Sioux City and to the Journal. In 1906, he challenged incumbent Republican Governor Albert B. Cummins for the party's nomination. He served as delegate to the Republican National Conventions in 1876, 1880, 1888, 1908, and 1912. Perkins died in Sioux City on February 3, 1914.

U.S. House of Representatives
| Preceded by Isaac S. Struble | Member of the U.S. House of Representatives from Iowa's 11th congressional district 1891–1899 | Succeeded by Lot Thomas |
