= Thomas J. Steele =

American politician

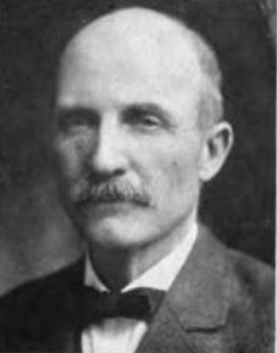

Member of the U.S. House of Representatives from Iowa's 11th district
- In office March 4, 1915 – March 3, 1917
- Preceded by: George Cromwell Scott
- Succeeded by: George Cromwell Scott

Personal details
- Born: Thomas Jefferson Steele; March 19, 1853 Rushville, Indiana, U.S.
- Died: March 20, 1920 (aged 67) Sioux City, Iowa, U.S.
- Resting place: Graceland Park Cemetery, Sioux City, Iowa, U.S.
- Party: Democratic

Thomas Jefferson Steele (March 19, 1853 – March 20, 1920) was a one-term Democratic U.S. Representative from Iowa's 11th congressional district in northwestern Iowa. Steele was the first and only Democrat elected to represent the 11th district in its fifty-year history (from 1883 to 1933).

Born near Rushville, Indiana, Steele attended the public schools and Axline Seminary in Fairfax, Iowa. He taught school in central and western Iowa, and studied law in Sheldon, Iowa. He engaged in the hardware business and in banking at Wayne, Nebraska, and served as county clerk of Wayne County, Nebraska, from 1884 to 1886.

In 1897, Steele moved to Sioux City, Iowa, where he became a livestock commission merchant. His livestock brokerage firm became very profitable, and he gained a good reputation in town. He may have influenced the decision of his architect nephew, William L. Steele (1875–1949), to relocate from Pittsburgh, Pennsylvania, to Sioux City in 1904. The elder Steele certainly was influential in assisting his nephew in securing some of his early commissions. This included the Sioux City Livestock Exchange Building (1914), which was among the first of the architect's designs in the Prairie School style of architecture for which he would become famous.

In 1914, Steele upset incumbent Republican Congressman George Cromwell Scott in the race to represent Iowa's 11th congressional district in the Sixty-fourth Congress. One rural newspaper explained, "the central feature of the Steele campaign was personal solicitation of votes and personal publicity concerning the candidate." By contrast, "Mr. Scott remained in Washington until ten days before the election and put in only one week of campaigning." Steele's win was particularly surprising because it occurred in a year in which Iowa Republicans swept all statewide offices and recaptured all seats in Congress held by Democrats.

Steele ran for re-election in 1916, and Scott again ran against him. This time, Scott campaigned more vigorously, and recaptured the seat from Steele in a very close race. Steele unsuccessfully contested the election. In all, Steele served in Congress from March 4, 1915, to March 3, 1917.

Steele resumed business as commission merchant.

Steele ran again for his former seat in the next election in 1918. Steele won the Democratic nomination, but lost in the general election to William D. Boies.

Steele died in Sioux City on March 20, 1920. He was interred in Graceland Park Cemetery in Sioux City.

U.S. House of Representatives
Preceded by George C. Scott	Member of the U.S. House of Representatives from Iowa's 11th congressional district 1915–1917	Succeeded by George C. Scott
