= Battle Creek (Maple River tributary) =

Stream in Ida County, Iowa, U.S.

Coordinates: 42.3172104°N 95.5822243°W

Battle Creek is a stream in Ida County, Iowa, United States. It is a tributary of the Maple River.

Some claim that Battle Creek was named for a skirmish between Native American tribes near the stream. But according to the bronze plate State of Iowa historical marker at the bottom of Battle Hill in the ditch next to Iowa State Highway 175, about one mile east of Battle Creek, this hill, creek, and town were named after a small battle between a government surveying party and a band of Sioux Native Americans that took place in 1849. This Battle Hill historical marker reads as follows: "On this site in 1849, a battle was fought between a government surveyor's party and the Sioux Indians, giving this hill, the stream at its foot and the town of Battle Creek, their names."

== See also ==
- List of rivers of Iowa
