= Robert Struble Jr. =

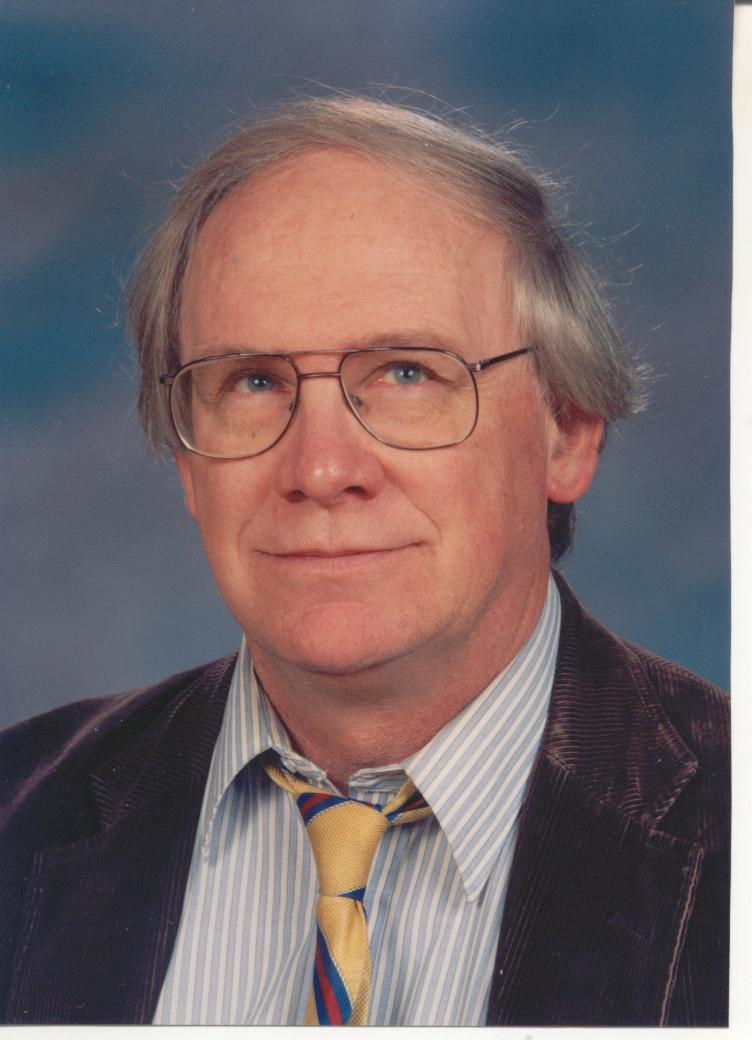
Bob Struble Jr., c. 1997

Robert Clayton Struble Jr. (June 7, 1943 - February 26, 2016) was a schoolteacher, historian, author and associate editor at Catholic Lane.

== Teaching ==
Struble was a history/social studies teacher. During 17 years over the period 1981 to 2007, Struble taught in the public and private schools of Washington State. American football, soccer, and chess are among the extra-curricular activities that he had coached, including a student team to the Washington state chess championship of 1993.

For two years in the mid-1980s he was the resident historian at Sea Pines Abroad, a private prep school in Faistenau bei Salzburg, Austria, a job which he described as his "belated grand tour."

== Politics ==
In the election campaign prior to November 3, 2009, Struble was Protect Marriage Washington's spokesman on Referendum 71. His job included televised debates around the state against advocates for same sex marriage, or its equivalency.

Struble's political career had included party politics. He served three biennial terms (1995–1998) as GOP Washington State committeeman from Kitsap County. In 2007, Struble became an independent, having resigned from the Republican Party over the issue of torture.

He served also on the steering committee (1990–1992) of LIMIT, which ran Initiative 573, the term limits law passed by the electorate of WA State in November, 1992. In 1993 he wrote a history of this campaign in, “Second Time A Charm: Term Limits in Washington State,” a paper delivered at the Annual Meeting of the Western Political Science Association, Pasadena, CA, 3/18/93.

== Ancestry, education and personal ==
Struble was born June 7, 1943, to Ruth (Cowan) Struble and Bob Struble, Sr., then a Captain in the U.S. Army and later a recognized welfare reformer.

He was also great-grandson of Iowa City pioneer, John T. Struble, and great-grandnephew of 19th century political leaders, Congressman Isaac Struble and Speaker of the Iowa House, George R. Struble.

He attended parochial schools grades 1–12, graduating with honors from Blanchet High School in Seattle. During his senior year, Struble won a national essay contest and was named all conference quarterback for the Northwest Catholic football league. During his college years at San Diego State he served as graduate representative and administrative vice-president of the student body during the tumult of the 1960s; also as campus chairman of SMC, the student mobilization committee against the Vietnam War. At SDSU he was admitted to a chapter of Phi Alpha Theta, the honor society in History, and to another chapter of the same honor society at Eastern Washington University. At EWU he took his second BA (in Education).

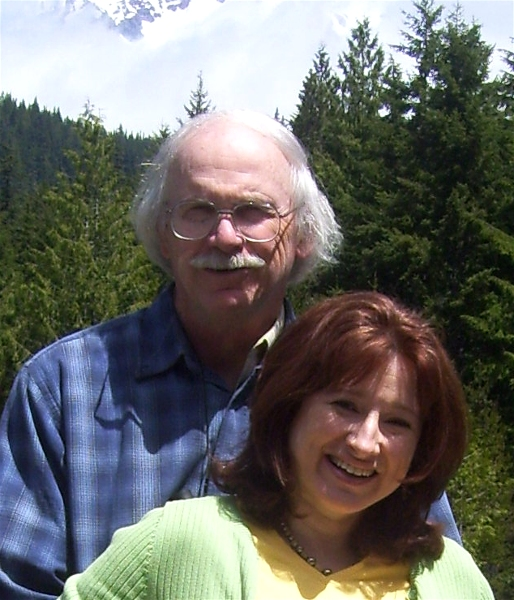
Bob & Jeryl Struble, 2008

Struble had traveled on every continent in the Northern Hemisphere. He enjoyed a variety of music, played piano, wrote poetry, and competed in the local chess club. His memberships included the Knights of Columbus, the Ft. Nisqually Foundation, the Washington Bluegrass Association, and the National Association of Scholars.

In 1988 he married Jeryl (Bangs) Struble, a schoolteacher, singer, and Russian translator. Their three children are Kathryn (b. 1989), Daniel (b. 1993), and Michael (b. 1998). The family lives in Bremerton, Washington.

== Death ==
Bob Struble Jr. died February 26, 2016, from liver cancer.

== Selected academic and literary publications ==
- "House Turnover and the Principle of Rotation," Political Science Quarterly 94 (Winter 1979-80): 649-667.
- With Z.W. Jahre, "Rotation in Office: Rapid but Restricted to the House," PS: Political Science & Politics 24 (March 1991): 34-37.
- "Ádapting Term Limits to A Bicameral Congress," The Long Term View 1 (Winter, 1992): 12. Quarterly publication of the Massachusetts School of Law at Andover.
- "Toward a Structural Solution to Unemployment," International Journal of Social Economics 20, no. 11 (1993): 15-26. Published in UK, MCB University Press, Bradford, England. doi:10.1108/03068299310046063
- "Second Time A Charm: Term Limits in Washington State," paper delivered at the 1993 Annual Meeting of the Western Political Science Association, Pasadena, CA, March 18, 1993.
- "My Quarrel with Libertarianism," Fidelity 15 (March 1996), pp. 17–19. Published by Ultramontaine Associates, South Bend, Indiana.
- "Of Heroes and the Rule of Law," National Catholic Register, (Oct. 12-18, 2003), p. 8.
- Knights of Columbus, Council 1379: Centennial, February 21, 1909 – 2009: A Brief History (57 page booklet)
- Articles on various subjects, in Catholic Exchange, the online daily, 2009-2010. Topics include the theory of resistance, with pertinence to an Article V Convention.
- Articles & poems on various topics in Catholic Lane, 2011-2013.
