= Isaac S. Struble =

American politician (1843–1913)

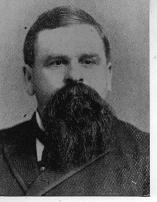
Isaac Struble

Isaac Sterling Struble (November 3, 1843 – February 17, 1913) was an American politician who was a four-term Republican Representative of Iowa's 11th congressional district. Serving from 1883 to 1891, the Plymouth County resident was a noted congressional opponent of plural marriage in the Utah Territory.

The member of a politically active family, Isaac's six brothers included John T. Struble of Iowa, and George R. Struble, former speaker of the Iowa House of Representatives. He was the granduncle of Bob Struble, Sr. and great-granduncle of Bob Struble, Jr.

== Early life ==
Isaac Struble of Le Mars, Iowa, was born near Fredericksburg, Virginia. His great-grandfather, Dietrich Struble of Albig bei Alzey, Germany, had sailed to Philadelphia in 1748, settling outside German Valley, New Jersey (since renamed Long Valley). As a boy, Isaac migrated to Ohio and finally to Iowa, where the family settled on a farm near Iowa City. He was educated in the public schools of Ohio and Iowa.

Struble fought in the Civil War. In August 1862, Struble (then 18) enlisted in Company F of the 22nd Iowa Volunteer Infantry Regiment, marching in the ranks of the Union Army as a private. When he first donned the uniform of the Union, Isaac stood 5'8" with brown eyes and reddish hair. After he was wounded in the Battle of Cedar Creek in Virginia on October 19, 1864, he was promoted to the rank of sergeant. He was mustered out of the service on July 25, 1865. In addition to Cedar Creek, his combat experience included the Battle of Port Gibson, the Siege of Vicksburg, and the Battle of Opequon (otherwise known as the Third Battle of Winchester).

== Post-bellum ==
In 1866, more than a year after the Civil War, Struble went to St. Louis, Missouri, where he remained about a year as bookkeeper in the wholesale house of J.H. Teasdale & Co., where his uncle was the senior partner. He then moved to Iowa where he attended law school. After admission to the bar he became a practicing attorney in Polo, Illinois in 1870. In 1872, Struble moved to Le Mars, Iowa. Le Mars, in Plymouth County, was then a three-year-old town with a total of some 50 houses. There he and an older brother, James Hammie Struble, set up their law office on Main Street. For the next ten years he applied himself to private legal practice in Le Mars, holding no public office until 1882.

He married Adelaide E. Stone on June 3, 1874.

== Congressional career ==
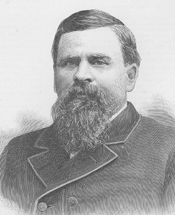
Congressman Struble

As a result of the 1880 census, Iowa's delegation in the U.S. House increased from nine to eleven members, causing the 1881 Iowa General Assembly (where George R. Struble was midway through his term as speaker of the House of Representatives) to reapportion the state's nine-district map into an eleven-district map. Plymouth County and much of northwestern Iowa was included in a new Eleventh District. In 1882, Isaac Struble won the Republican nomination to become the Eleventh District's first representative, then won the general election, becoming a member of the Forty-eighth United States Congress. Struble entered the U.S. House as a member of a freshman class so large that it made up a majority of the House membership, something that has never recurred.

During the three subsequent elections (in 1884, 1886, and 1888), Struble won the Republican renomination by acclamation in district nomination conventions then defeated Democratic Party and Greenback Party candidates in the general election. Struble was, according to the New York Times, "exceptionally popular" at the end of his third term. But in 1890, after 43 ballots, the GOP nominating convention gave its nod to the newspaper editor and former state senator, George D. Perkins of Sioux City, who held the seat from 1891 to 1899. In all, Struble served in Congress from March 4, 1883 to March 3, 1891.

Struble's support in Congress for the McKinley Tariff bill in 1890 had been unpopular with farmers in Iowa, who foresaw that a trade war would hurt agricultural exports. The tariff was also a factor in the subsequent economic depression of 1893–97. The tariff's widespread unpopularity at the time of its passage resulted in a Democratic landslide so sweeping nationally that the election of 1890 dropped the Republicans from their majority of 51% in the House down to a minority of only 27% of the House membership.

During his four terms (1883–1891), Congressman Struble enjoyed considerable popularity in his district among rank-and-file citizens, and a small town founded at the time was given the name "Struble" in his honor.

Another measure of Struble's popularity as a representative in Congress was the impressive reception he received in his hometown of LeMars when, in March 1891, he made his final return to Iowa from the halls of Congress. Upon arriving by train, he was greeted by a large crowd, and regaled by the local Striker's Band. A stage had been prepared, and after welcoming words from the mayor and local dignitaries, Struble delivered his farewell address.

As reprinted in the LeMars Sentinel Struble's speech outlined the blessings and burdens of being a member of the House of Representatives contemporaneous with the likes of House Speaker Thomas Brackett Reed, future speaker Joe Cannon and future president William McKinley. He offered remarks about such subjects as the proper limits of partisan politics, political patronage, and the heavy load of constituent services and committee work already demanded of a Congressman at that time. His reflections offer a useful study on the "ombudsman" role as it operated a dozen decades ago, a task so time-consuming in the 21st century that several staffers per Congressman work full-time on constituent services.

On his career in Congress the Congressional Record provides further information, including his votes and the text of his floor speeches. The History of Woodbury and Plymouth Counties published in the early 1890s indicates that, from the standpoint of his peers in Congress, Struble "was always considered a strong member." As a former soldier, Congressman Struble devoted much time to the interests of his constituents in the armed services, including veterans. He knew how to secure lucrative projects for his district, such as the Sioux City public building bill (1890). It was in the United States House Committee on Territories, however, that Struble figured most prominently.

Struble chaired this standing committee during his fourth term. His influence in the Committee on the Territories played a significant role in the admission into the union of six western states – Idaho, Montana, Washington, Wyoming and the two Dakotas, and the organization of Oklahoma Territory. Meanwhile, Senator Shelby Cullom of Illinois together with Congressman Struble pushed the Cullom-Struble Bill, whose sanctions against polygamy included exclusion of the Utah Territory from statehood. The bill was on the verge of passing Congress in 1890, but the legislation was preempted when the Church of Jesus Christ of Latter-day Saints (LDS Church) formally disavowed polygamous marriages with the 1890 Manifesto.

During their political careers, he and his brother, George R. Struble, were cultural conservatives of the 19th century sort. Both supported prohibition, and Isaac was prominent in his opposition to bigamy. Their stands on these controversial issues made more than a few enemies.

== After Congress ==
The law practice which he resumed in LeMars dealt sometimes with collections. As a lawyer, Struble acquired an enemy, William Cassmer, who became so incensed that he entered Struble's office with a whip, but Struble, then 63, faced him down. On the following day, however, while outside on the sidewalk, Struble made the mistake, as he later admitted, of turning his back on Cassmer. Cassmer struck Struble on the back of the neck, which rendered Struble unconscious for several minutes and resulted in injuries requiring the attention of a physician.

Isaac was a charter member of the First Congregational Church in Le Mars, and was also active in the Masonic fraternal order.

Struble died suddenly of a diabetic seizure in Le Mars, and is buried in the Le Mars Cemetery. He was survived by his wife and four of his five children.

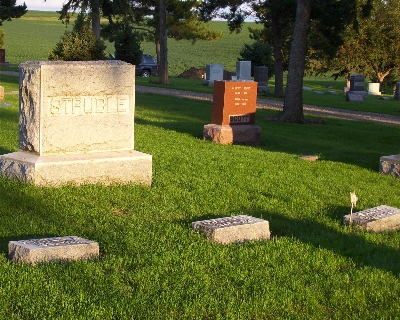
Three Struble headstones from left, daughter, Myrtle; wife, Adelaide; and Isaac.

=== References ===
- United States Congress. Biographical "STRUBLE, Isaac S (id: S001028/Biographical)". Biographical Directory of the United States Congress.; History of the Counties of Woodbury and Plymouth, Iowa, (Chicago: A. Warner & Co., 1890–91), pp. 1009–1011; W.S. Freeman, ed., History of Plymouth County Iowa, 2 vols. (Indianapolis, Ind.: B.F. Bowen & Co., 1917), vol. 1, p. 333; Le Mars Sentinel, March 20, 1891, p. 4; March 27, 1902, p. 3; February 13, 1906, p. 4; February 18, 1913, p. 1. Photo at top courtesy of Eleanor Struble Martin; the portrait from Harper's Weekly, 1891, Collection of U.S. Congressmen, as found in Biographical Directory, supra.
- On the controversial circumstances of Congressman Struble's defeat for renomination in the Iowa GOP's 11th Congressional District nominating convention of 1890 see two contemporary newspaper articles: "Political Notes," New York Times, Wednesday, July 29, 1890, p. 4; "An Iowa District in Doubt: Why That Represented by Mr. Struble May Go Democratic," New York Times, Wednesday September 14, 1890, p. 20.

== Endnotes, including excerpts from Struble's speeches ==
U.S. House of Representatives
Preceded by District created	Member of the U.S. House of Representatives from Iowa's 11th congressional district 1883–1891	Succeeded by George D. Perkins
