= Eva Struble =

American painter

- Born: 1981 (age 44–45); Kentucky, U.S.
- Education: Brown University; Yale School of Art
- Known for: Paintings
- Movement: Abstract

Eva Struble (born 1981 in Kentucky) is an artist based in San Diego, California.

Struble received a BA in visual arts in 2003 from Brown University in Providence and an MFA in 2006 from Yale University School of Art in New Haven.

She has shown work in many exhibitions including solo exhibits Gravity of Small Things at Jane Lombard Gallery in New York (2024), Produce at the Museum of Contemporary Art San Diego (2014), and has shown work in group exhibitions at White Columns (New York), PPOW Gallery (New York), Museum of Contemporary Art Cleveland among many others. She is represented by Jane Lombard Gallery in New York.

An Art in America review of her 2006 Lombard-Freid solo show, Superfund, called her paintings "eerily colorful". She is a professor at San Diego State University School of Art and Design and resides in San Diego, CA.
