= Elbert H. Hubbard =

American politician (1849–1912)

Elbert Hamilton Hubbard
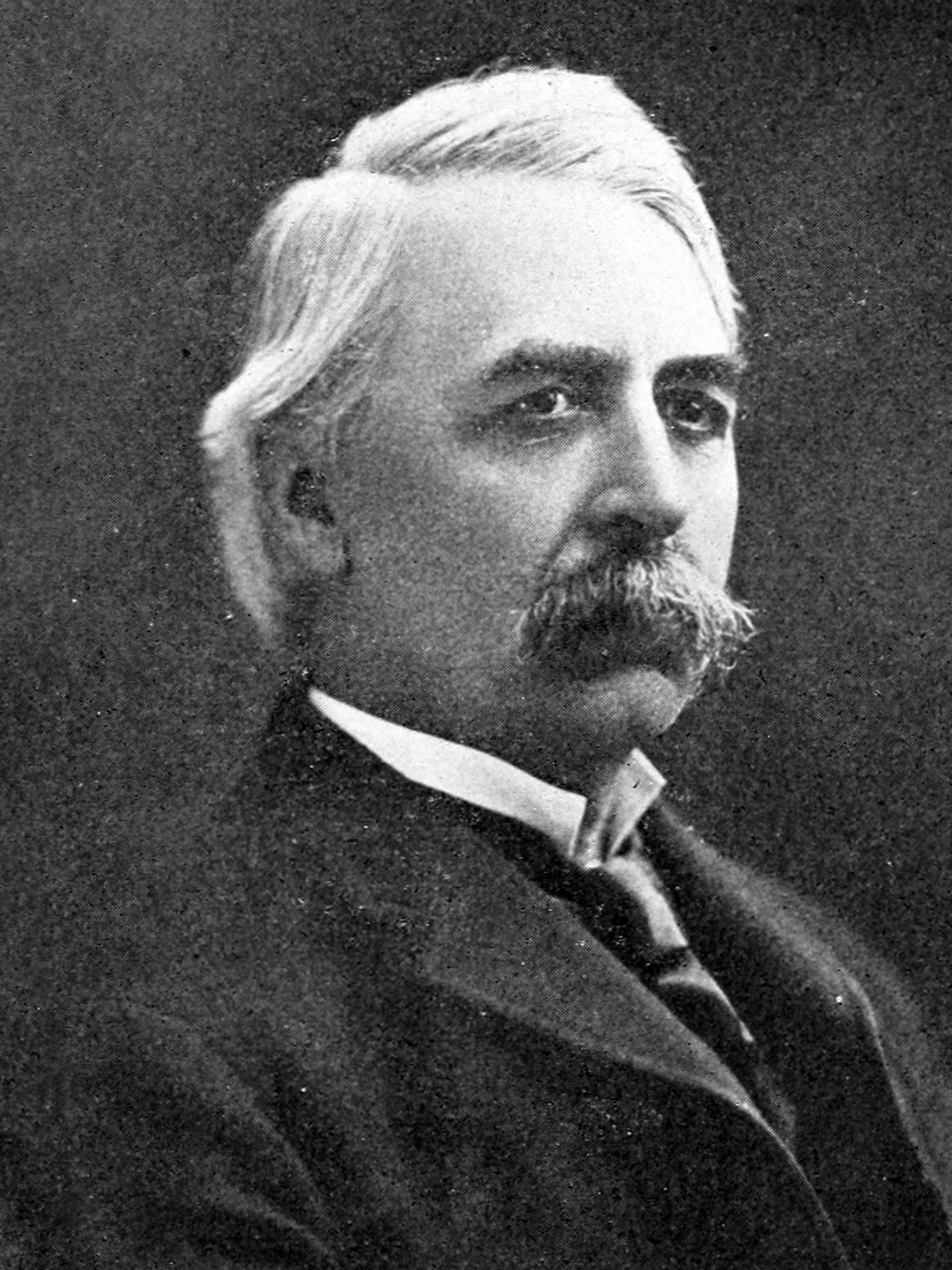
- Hubbard in 1903

Member of the U.S. House of Representatives from Iowa's 11th district
- In office March 4, 1905 – June 4, 1912
- Preceded by: Lot Thomas
- Succeeded by: George Cromwell Scott

Personal details
- Born: August 19, 1849 Rushville, Indiana, U.S.
- Died: June 4, 1912 (aged 62) Sioux City, Iowa, U.S.
- Education: Yale College

Elbert Hamilton Hubbard (August 19, 1849 – June 4, 1912) was an American politician who served in the U.S. representative from the 11th congressional district in northwestern Iowa.

Born in Rushville, Indiana to Judge Asahel Wheeler Hubbard and his wife, Hubbard attended the public schools and was instructed by a private tutor. He came with his father to Iowa in 1856, locating at Sioux City, Iowa. During the Civil War, his father was elected three times to represent Iowa's newly created 6th congressional district in the U.S. House, serving from March 4, 1863, to March 3, 1869. During the end of his father's Congressional service, Elbert Hubbard began to attend Yale College, graduating in 1872. After studying law in Sioux City with C. R. Marks, he was admitted to the bar in 1874 and commenced practice in Sioux City.

In 1881 he was elected to the Iowa House of Representatives from Woodbury County, Iowa. In 1899 he was elected to the Iowa State Senate, where he served from 1900 to 1902.

In 1904, Lot Thomas, the Congressman representing Iowa's 11th congressional district, declined to run for re-election, prompting Hubbard and many other Republicans in northwest Iowa to run for the seat. On May 6, 1904, Hubbard won the Republican nomination on the 65th ballot at the district convention. With popular president Theodore Roosevelt at the top of the Republican ticket that November, Hubbard won, as part of a Republican sweep of all eleven Iowa U.S. House elections. After serving in the Fifty-ninth Congress, he was re-elected three times to the three succeeding Congresses. One day after defeating challenger George Cromwell Scott the 1912 Republican primary, he died. In all, Hubbard served in Congress from March 4, 1905, to June 4, 1912. He was interred in Floyd Cemetery in Sioux City.

== See also ==
- List of members of the United States Congress who died in office (1900–1949)

U.S. House of Representatives
Preceded by Lot Thomas	Member of the U.S. House of Representatives from Iowa's 11th congressional district 1905–1912	Succeeded by George C. Scott
