= Battle Creek, Iowa =

- City
- Location of Battle Creek, Iowa
- Coordinates: 42°19′01″N 95°36′00″W
- Country: US
- State: Iowa
- County: Ida

Area
  - Total: 0.57 sq mi (1.48 km^{2})
  - Land: 0.57 sq mi (1.48 km^{2})
  - Water: 0 sq mi (0.00 km^{2})
- Elevation: 1,198 ft (365 m)

Population (2020)
  - Total: 700
  - Density: 1,224.2/sq mi (472.66/km^{2})
- Time zone: UTC-6 (Central (CST))
  - Summer (DST): UTC-5 (CDT)
- ZIP code: 51006
- Area code: 712
- FIPS code: 19-04870
- GNIS feature ID: 2394081
- Website: battlecreekia.org

Battle Creek is a city in Ida County, Iowa, United States. The population was 700 at the 2020 census.

== History ==
Battle Creek got its start in the year 1877, following construction of the Chicago and North Western Railway through that territory. It was named after nearby Battle Creek. The town was incorporated in 1880.

== Celebrations ==
Battle Creek holds a Fourth of July celebration every year from July 3 through July 5. In 2015 Battle Creek celebrated its sesquicentennial (150 years) over the July 4th holiday. The slogan for their 150th celebration is Small In Size, Big In Heart which shows how much pride this small town takes in this event. During the celebration there is a parade, fireworks, the Fireman's dance, and you can even enter in the frog jumping contest.

== Geography ==
Battle Creek is situated on the Maple River.

According to the United States Census Bureau, the city has a total area of 0.50 square miles (1.29 km^{2}), all land.

== Demographics ==
Historical populations
Year	Pop.	±%
1880	205	—
1890	387	+88.8%
1900	542	+40.1%
1910	527	−2.8%
1920	785	+49.0%
1930	804	+2.4%
1940	827	+2.9%
1950	873	+5.6%
1960	786	−10.0%
1970	837	+6.5%
1980	919	+9.8%
1990	818	−11.0%
2000	743	−9.2%
2010	713	−4.0%
2020	700	−1.8%
Source:"U.S. Census website". United States Census Bureau. and Iowa Data Center; Source: U.S. Decennial Census

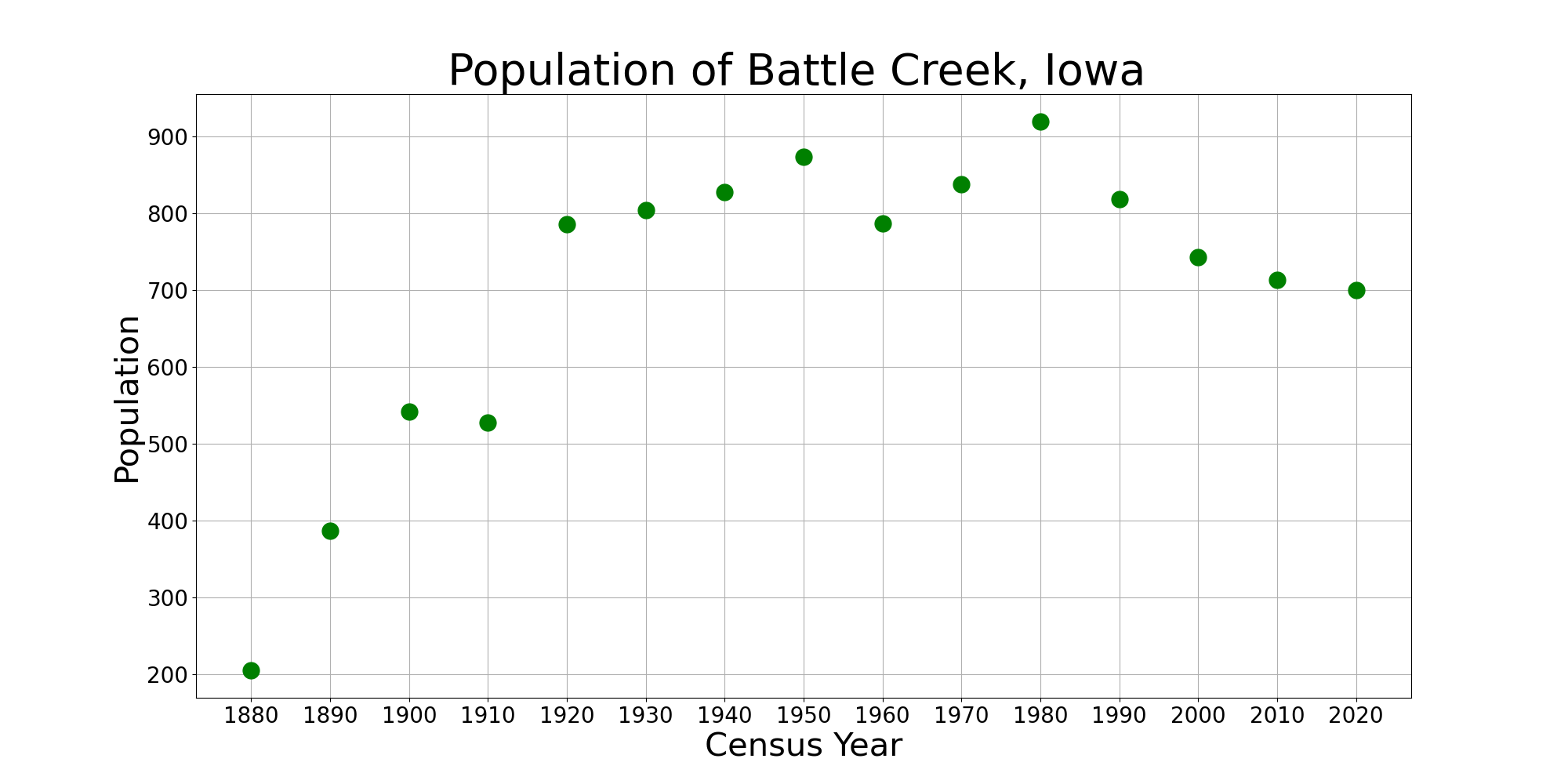
The population of Battle Creek, Iowa from US census data

=== 2020 census ===
As of the census of 2020, there were 700 people, 291 households, and 178 families residing in the city. The population density was 1,224.2 inhabitants per square mile (472.7/km^{2}). There were 340 housing units at an average density of 594.6 per square mile (229.6/km^{2}). The racial makeup of the city was 95.7% White, 0.0% Black or African American, 0.1% Native American, 0.0% Asian, 0.6% Pacific Islander, 1.4% from other races and 2.1% from two or more races. Hispanic or Latino persons of any race comprised 2.9% of the population.

Of the 291 households, 27.1% of which had children under the age of 18 living with them, 42.6% were married couples living together, 7.2% were cohabitating couples, 29.6% had a female householder with no spouse or partner present and 20.6% had a male householder with no spouse or partner present. 38.8% of all households were non-families. 35.1% of all households were made up of individuals, 22.3% had someone living alone who was 65 years old or older.

The median age in the city was 47.8 years. 25.3% of the residents were under the age of 20; 2.3% were between the ages of 20 and 24; 20.3% were from 25 and 44; 21.0% were from 45 and 64; and 31.1% were 65 years of age or older. The gender makeup of the city was 46.0% male and 54.0% female.

=== 2010 census ===
As of the census of 2010, there were 713 people, 325 households, and 178 families residing in the city. The population density was 1,426.0 inhabitants per square mile (550.6/km^{2}). There were 368 housing units at an average density of 736.0 per square mile (284.2/km^{2}). The racial makeup of the city was 98.2% White, 0.6% African American, 0.8% Asian, 0.3% from other races, and 0.1% from two or more races. Hispanic or Latino of any race were 1.7% of the population.

There were 325 households, of which 24.9% had children under the age of 18 living with them, 45.8% were married couples living together, 4.6% had a female householder with no husband present, 4.3% had a male householder with no wife present, and 45.2% were non-families. 42.2% of all households were made up of individuals, and 23.3% had someone living alone who was 65 years of age or older. The average household size was 2.11 and the average family size was 2.85.

The median age in the city was 46.3 years. 23% of residents were under the age of 18; 5.6% were between the ages of 18 and 24; 19.9% were from 25 to 44; 24.6% were from 45 to 64; and 26.9% were 65 years of age or older. The gender makeup of the city was 48.1% male and 51.9% female.

=== 2000 census ===
As of the census of 2000, there were 743 people, 325 households, and 195 families residing in the city. The population density was 1,490.5 inhabitants per square mile (575.5/km^{2}). There were 358 housing units at an average density of 718.2 per square mile (277.3/km^{2}). The racial makeup of the city was 99.33% White, 0.13% Asian, 0.13% from other races, and 0.40% from two or more races. Hispanic or Latino of any race were 0.67% of the population.

There were 325 households, out of which 21.2% had children under the age of 18 living with them, 52.9% were married couples living together, 5.2% had a female householder with no husband present, and 39.7% were non-families. 36.9% of all households were made up of individuals, and 23.4% had someone living alone who was 65 years of age or older. The average household size was 2.15 and the average family size was 2.83.

In the city, the population was spread out, with 19.8% under the age of 18, 5.8% from 18 to 24, 18.8% from 25 to 44, 24.0% from 45 to 64, and 31.6% who were 65 years of age or older. The median age was 49 years. For every 100 females, there were 87.6 males. For every 100 females age 18 and over, there were 85.7 males.

The median income for a household in the city was $31,029, and the median income for a family was $39,479. Males had a median income of $25,400 versus $19,931 for females. The per capita income for the city was $16,106. About 3.0% of families and 7.3% of the population were below the poverty line, including 4.8% of those under age 18 and 6.0% of those age 65 or over.

== Education ==
Battle Creek is a part of the Odebolt–Arthur–Battle Creek–Ida Grove Community School District.

It was formerly a part of the Battle Creek–Ida Grove Community School District, which was established in 1994, until its merger with the Odebolt–Arthur Community School District on July 1, 2018. Schools serving the community include OABCIG Elementary Ida Grove in Ida Grove, OABCIG Middle School in Odebolt, and OABCIG High School in Ida Grove.

== Notable persons ==
- Ed H. Campbell, US Representative from Iowa
- Alvin Etler, composer and musician'
- Thomas H. Brodersen, Iowa State Representative
