= George Cromwell Scott =

American judge (1864–1948)

George C. Scott
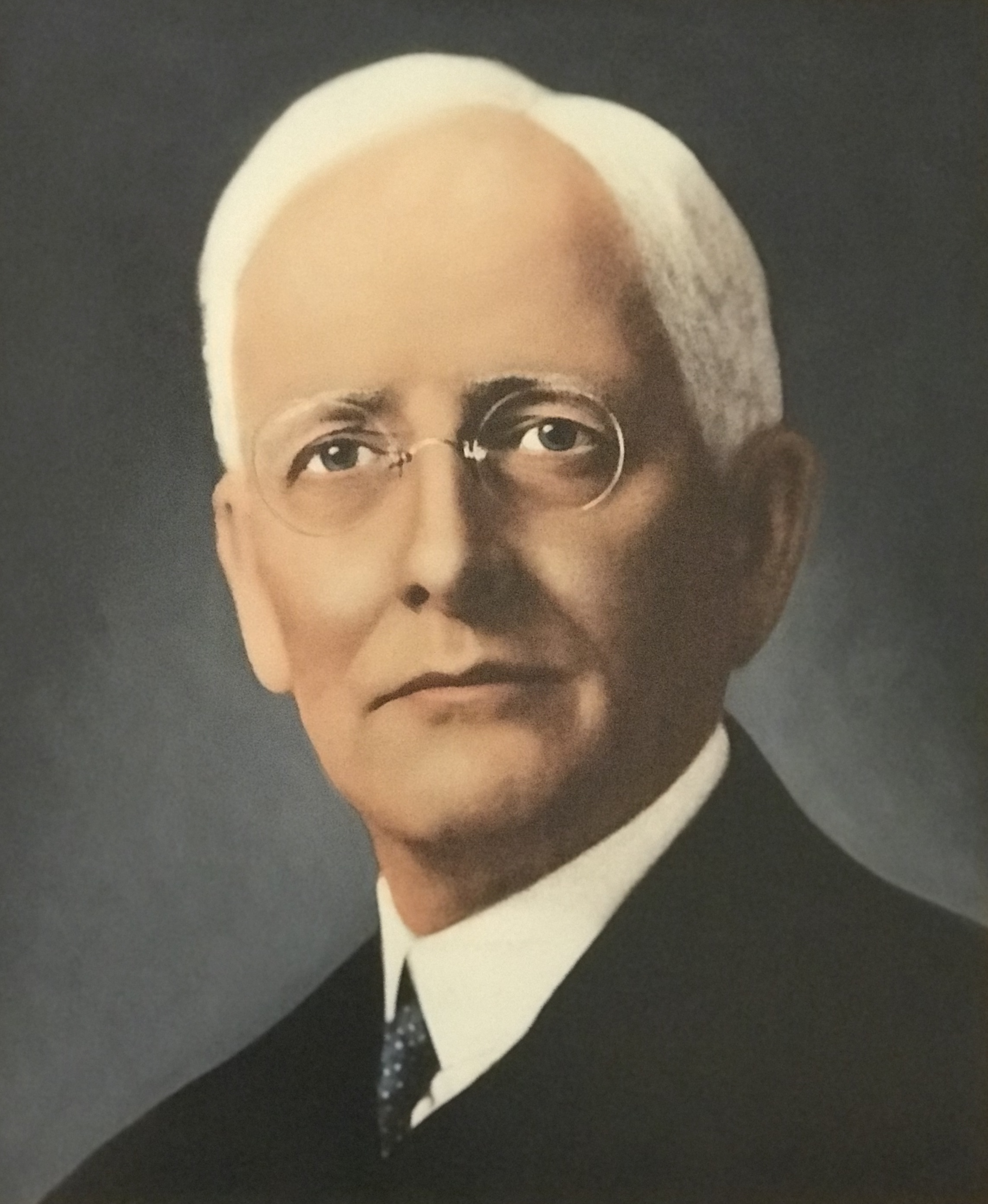
- Scott's court portrait

Senior Judge of the United States District Court for the Northern District of Iowa
- In office November 1, 1943 – October 6, 1948

Judge of the United States District Court for the Northern District of Iowa
- In office February 21, 1922 – November 1, 1943
- Appointed by: Warren G. Harding
- Preceded by: Henry Thomas Reed
- Succeeded by: Henry Norman Graven

Member of the U.S. House of Representatives from Iowa's 11th district
- In office March 4, 1917 – March 3, 1919
- Preceded by: Thomas J. Steele
- Succeeded by: William D. Boies
- In office November 5, 1912 – March 3, 1915
- Preceded by: Elbert H. Hubbard
- Succeeded by: Thomas J. Steele

Personal details
- Born: August 8, 1864 Kendall, New York
- Died: October 6, 1948 (aged 84) Sioux City, Iowa
- Resting place: Graceland Park Cemetery; Sioux City, Iowa
- Party: Republican
- Education: read law

George Cromwell Scott (August 8, 1864 – October 6, 1948) was a United States representative from Iowa's 11th congressional district for just over four years, and was a United States district judge of the United States District Court for the Northern District of Iowa.

== Education and career ==
Born near East Kendall (now Morton), an unincorporated hamlet in the Town of Kendall, Monroe County, New York, Scott's mother died when he was two years old, and his father died when he was five. After being raised by his uncle, Scott moved to Iowa in 1880, when he was sixteen, to live with other relatives. He attended the country schools and the high school at Dallas Center, Iowa. He taught school while studying the equivalent of a full college course load under the tutilege of his wife, Laura. After studying law while working for a law firm in Adel, Iowa, he was admitted to the bar in 1887 and commenced practice in Le Mars, Iowa, in 1888. He moved to Sioux City in 1901 and continued the practice of law.

== Congressional service ==
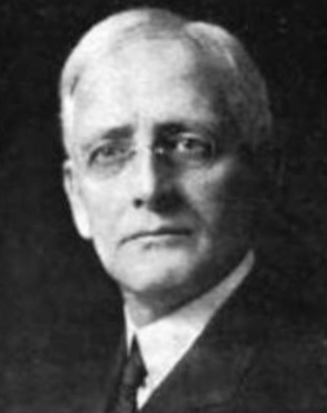
Scott, c. 1913

In January 1912, Scott announced his candidacy for the United States House of Representatives seat in Iowa's 11th congressional district, which was then held by fellow Republican Elbert H. Hubbard. Hubbard defeated Scott in the June 3 primary, but died the following day. A nominating convention in July 1912 gave Scott the nomination over state senator Leslie E. Francis. Upon defeating Democratic and Bull Moose Party challengers in the general election, Scott was immediately sworn to fill the remainder of Hubbard's term in the 62nd United States Congress. Scott then served another full term in the 63rd United States Congress. In 1914 Scott was renominated by the Republicans for a second full term, but was upset in the general election by Democrat Thomas J. Steele. Explained one rural newspaper, "the central feature of the Steele campaign was personal solicitation of votes and personal publicity concerning the candidate." By contrast, "Mr. Scott remained in Washington until ten days before the election and put in only one week of campaigning." However, Scott ran again two years later, and recaptured his seat from Steele in one of the closest election in House history (winning by 4 votes in an election finally settled by the House itself).

He was not a candidate for renomination in 1918. In all, Scott served in Congress from November 5, 1912, to March 3, 1915, and from March 4, 1917, to March 3, 1919. After leaving Congress, Scott resumed the practice of law in Sioux City.

== Federal judicial service ==
Scott was nominated by President Warren G. Harding on February 16, 1922, to a seat on the United States District Court for the Northern District of Iowa vacated by Judge Henry Thomas Reed. He was confirmed by the United States Senate on February 21, 1922, and received his commission the same day. He assumed senior status on November 1, 1943. His service terminated on October 6, 1948, due to his death in Sioux City. He was interred in Graceland Park Cemetery in Sioux City.

== Sources ==
- "George Cromwell Scott". Biographical Directory of the United States Congress.

U.S. House of Representatives
Preceded by Elbert H. Hubbard	Member of the U.S. House of Representatives from Iowa's 11th congressional district 1912–1915	Succeeded by Thomas J. Steele
Preceded by Thomas J. Steele	Member of the U.S. House of Representatives from Iowa's 11th congressional district 1917–1919	Succeeded by William D. Boies
Legal offices
Preceded by Henry Thomas Reed	Judge of the United States District Court for the Northern District of Iowa; 1922–1943	Succeeded by Henry Norman Graven
