= Bob Struble =

Recipient of the Purple Heart medal

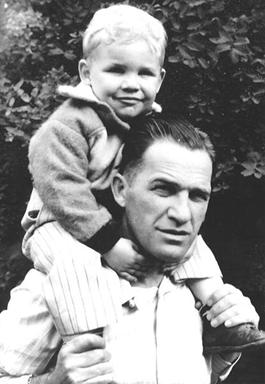
Struble with son, Robert, Jr., 1945

Robert Struble (1899–1967) was a political figure and social welfare reformer in Washington from the post-World War II years until his death in Seattle on July 26, 1967.

== Career ==
From 1949 to 1953 Struble was chief assistant to Jack Taylor, Washington State Commissioner of Public Lands. He also pioneered welfare reform in Washington state during his years (1957–1967) with the non-disabled program (NDVR) within the state Division of Vocational Rehabilitation. Under Struble's leadership, the NDVR program attracted national attention for its initiative in converting welfare from handouts to career retraining. Administratively, NDVR sought to apply the proverb about teaching people how to fish rather than merely giving fish to needy people.

In the mid-1950s, during the nascency of television in Spokane, Struble was an executive with KXLY.

== Awards and honors ==
He was a U.S. veteran of both World Wars, and was awarded the Purple Heart for service in France during World War I.

== Family ==
He was the grandnephew of ex-Iowa Congressman Isaac Struble and the first cousin of football hall-of-famer Max Krause.

== Excerpt from Look article on welfare reform, 1965 ==
"She (Alicia Carlington) could have dimmed her ambitions and thus found help within the rules of the welfare system. But she would then have failed. That she did not have to fail is a tribute to the humanity of Johnson, Struble, Murphy and others who cared enough to become involved with another person, to give part of themselves, to go out of their way – to use all the human resources of a system that is too often applied impersonally, thoughtlessly, grimly. They dared to break, or at least bend, some of the habits that so often make a prison of a society crammed with treasures.

"Why did they do it? Perhaps they are better men than most; perhaps they saw in Mrs. Carlington an uncommon spirit and a chance for a return on their risk. Whatever the reason, Mrs. Carlington got the help she had to have. She used it." (See below, References, J. Polly article)
