= List of United States representatives in the 50th Congress =

This is a complete list of United States representatives during the 50th United States Congress listed by seniority.

As an historical article, the districts and party affiliations listed reflect those during the 50th Congress (March 4, 1887 – March 3, 1889). Seats and party affiliations on similar lists for other congresses will be different for certain members.

Seniority depends on the date on which members were sworn into office. Since many members are sworn in on the same day, subsequent ranking is based on previous congressional service of the individual and then by alphabetical order by the last name of the representative.

Committee chairmanship in the House is often associated with seniority. However, party leadership is typically not associated with seniority.

Note: The "*" indicates that the representative/delegate may have served one or more non-consecutive terms while in the House of Representatives of the United States Congress.

== U.S. House seniority list ==
U.S. House seniority
Rank	Representative	Party	District	Seniority date (Previous service, if any)	No.# of term(s)	Notes
1	William D. Kelley	R	PA-04	March 4, 1861	14th term	Dean of the House
2	Samuel J. Randall	D	PA-03	March 4, 1863	13th term	
3	Richard P. Bland	D	MO-11	March 4, 1873	8th term	
4	James Henderson Blount	D	GA-06	March 4, 1873	8th term	
5	Joseph G. Cannon	R	IL-15	March 4, 1873	8th term	
6	Roger Q. Mills	D	TX-09	March 4, 1873	8th term	
7	Charles O'Neill	R	PA-02	March 4, 1873; Previous service, 1863–1871.	12th term*	
8	David B. Culberson	D	TX-04	March 4, 1875	7th term	
9	William H. Forney	D	AL-07	March 4, 1875	7th term	
10	Thomas J. Henderson	R	IL-07	March 4, 1875	7th term	
11	William McKendree Springer	D	IL-13	March 4, 1875	7th term	
12	Thomas McKee Bayne	R	PA-23	March 4, 1877	6th term	
13	Thomas M. Browne	R	IN-06	March 4, 1877	6th term	
14	John G. Carlisle	D	KY-06	March 4, 1877	6th term	Speaker of the House
15	Robert H. M. Davidson	D	FL-01	March 4, 1877	6th term	
16	Alfred C. Harmer	R	PA-05	March 4, 1877; Previous service, 1871–1875.	8th term*	
17	Hilary A. Herbert	D	AL-02	March 4, 1877	6th term	
18	John H. Ketcham	R	NY-16	March 4, 1877; Previous service, 1865–1873.	10th term*	
19	Thomas Brackett Reed	R	ME-01	March 4, 1877	6th term	
20	Thomas Ryan	R	KS-04	March 4, 1877	6th term	
21	Richard W. Townshend	D	IL-19	March 4, 1877	6th term	
22	John Alexander Anderson	R	KS-05	March 4, 1879	5th term	
23	Henry H. Bingham	R	PA-01	March 4, 1879	5th term	
24	Martin L. Clardy	D	MO-10	March 4, 1879	5th term	Left the House in 1889.
25	Poindexter Dunn	D	AR-01	March 4, 1879	5th term	Left the House in 1889.
26	William H. Hatch	D	MO-01	March 4, 1879	5th term	
27	Leonidas C. Houk	R	TN-02	March 4, 1879	5th term	
28	Benton McMillin	D	TN-04	March 4, 1879	5th term	
29	John R. Thomas	R	IL-20	March 4, 1879	5th term	Left the House in 1889.
30	Ezra B. Taylor	R	OH-19	December 13, 1880	5th term	
31	Perry Belmont	D	NY-01	March 4, 1881	4th term	Resigned on December 1, 1888.
32	Newton C. Blanchard	D	LA-04	March 4, 1881	4th term	
33	Charles N. Brumm	R	PA-13	March 4, 1881	4th term	Left the House in 1889.
34	Judson C. Clements	D	GA-07	March 4, 1881	4th term	
35	Daniel Ermentrout	D	PA-08	March 4, 1881	4th term	Left the House in 1889.
36	Richard W. Guenther	R	WI-02	March 4, 1881	4th term	Left the House in 1889.
37	William S. Holman	D	IN-04	March 4, 1881; Previous service, 1859–1865 and 1867–1877.	12th term**	
38	Courtland C. Matson	D	IN-05	March 4, 1881	4th term	Left the House in 1889.
39	William C. Oates	D	AL-03	March 4, 1881	4th term	
40	Abraham X. Parker	R	NY-22	March 4, 1881	4th term	Left the House in 1889.
41	Lewis E. Payson	R	IL-09	March 4, 1881	4th term	
42	George Washington Steele	R	IN-11	March 4, 1881	4th term	Left the House in 1889.
43	Henry G. Turner	D	GA-02	March 4, 1881	4th term	
44	George D. Wise	D	VA-03	March 4, 1881	4th term	
45	Nelson Dingley Jr.	R	ME-02	September 12, 1881	4th term	
46	Henry J. Spooner	R	RI-01	December 5, 1881	4th term	
47	Robert R. Hitt	R	IL-06	December 4, 1882	4th term	
48	George E. Adams	R	IL-04	March 4, 1883	3rd term	
49	Louis E. Atkinson	R	PA-18	March 4, 1883	3rd term	
50	Charles A. Boutelle	R	ME-04	March 4, 1883	3rd term	
51	Clifton R. Breckinridge	D	AR-02	March 4, 1883	3rd term	
52	James N. Burnes	D	MO-04	March 4, 1883	3rd term	Died on January 23, 1889.
53	Felix Campbell	D	NY-02	March 4, 1883	3rd term	
54	Allen D. Candler	D	GA-09	March 4, 1883	3rd term	
55	Patrick Collins	D	MA-04	March 4, 1883	3rd term	Left the House in 1889.
56	Charles Frederick Crisp	D	GA-03	March 4, 1883	3rd term	
57	Byron M. Cutcheon	R	MI-09	March 4, 1883	3rd term	
58	George W. Dargan	D	SC-06	March 4, 1883	3rd term	
59	Robert T. Davis	R	MA-01	March 4, 1883	3rd term	Left the House in 1889.
60	Samuel Dibble	D	SC-01	March 4, 1883; Previous service, 1881–1882.	4th term*	
61	Alexander Monroe Dockery	D	MO-03	March 4, 1883	3rd term	
62	Ransom W. Dunham	R	IL-01	March 4, 1883	3rd term	Left the House in 1889.
63	Martin A. Foran	D	OH-21	March 4, 1883	3rd term	Left the House in 1889.
64	Nathan Goff Jr.	R	WV-01	March 4, 1883	3rd term	Left the House in 1889.
65	John J. Hemphill	D	SC-05	March 4, 1883	3rd term	
66	David B. Henderson	R	IA-03	March 4, 1883	3rd term	
67	Adoniram J. Holmes	R	IA-10	March 4, 1883	3rd term	Left the House in 1889.
68	James Laird	R	NE-02	March 4, 1883	3rd term	
69	S. W. T. Lanham	D	TX-11	March 4, 1883	3rd term	
70	John Davis Long	R	MA-02	March 4, 1883	3rd term	Left the House in 1889.
71	William McAdoo	D	NJ-07	March 4, 1883	3rd term	
72	Louis E. McComas	R	MD-06	March 4, 1883	3rd term	
73	Seth L. Milliken	R	ME-03	March 4, 1883	3rd term	
74	Edmund Needham Morrill	R	KS-01	March 4, 1883	3rd term	
75	Knute Nelson	R	MN-05	March 4, 1883	3rd term	Left the House in 1889.
76	John J. O'Neill	D	MO-08	March 4, 1883	3rd term	Left the House in 1889.
77	Samuel W. Peel	D	AR-05	March 4, 1883	3rd term	
78	Bishop W. Perkins	R	KS-03	March 4, 1883	3rd term	
79	Samuel R. Peters	R	KS-07	March 4, 1883	3rd term	
80	William Walter Phelps	R	NJ-05	March 4, 1883; Previous service, 1873–1875.	4th term*	Left the House in 1889.
81	John H. Rogers	D	AR-04	March 4, 1883	3rd term	
82	Jonathan H. Rowell	R	IL-14	March 4, 1883	3rd term	
83	George E. Seney	D	OH-05	March 4, 1883	3rd term	
84	Isaac Stephenson	R	WI-09	March 4, 1883	3rd term	Left the House in 1889.
85	Charles Stewart	D	TX-01	March 4, 1883	3rd term	
86	John Wolcott Stewart	R	VT-01	March 4, 1883	3rd term	
87	Isaac S. Struble	R	IA-11	March 4, 1883	3rd term	
88	George D. Tillman	D	SC-02	March 4, 1883; Previous service, 1879–1882.	5th term*	
89	William Whiting II	R	MA-11	March 4, 1883	3rd term	Left the House in 1889.
90	Beriah Wilkins	D	OH-16	March 4, 1883	3rd term	Left the House in 1889.
91	William Lyne Wilson	D	WV-02	March 4, 1883	3rd term	
92	Charles P. Snyder	D	WV-03	May 15, 1883	3rd term	Left the House in 1889.
93	James T. Jones	D	AL-01	December 3, 1883; Previous service, 1877–1879.	4th term*	Left the House in 1889.
94	Francis W. Rockwell	R	MA-12	January 17, 1884	3rd term	
95	Edward H. Funston	R	KS-02	March 21, 1884	3rd term	
96	Charles Triplett O'Ferrall	D	VA-07	May 5, 1884	3rd term	
97	James E. Campbell	D	OH-07	June 20, 1884	3rd term	Left the House in 1889.
98	Charles Herbert Allen	R	MA-08	March 4, 1885	2nd term	Left the House in 1889.
99	John Mills Allen	D	MS-01	March 4, 1885	2nd term	
100	Charles S. Baker	R	NY-30	March 4, 1885	2nd term	
101	George Thomas Barnes	D	GA-10	March 4, 1885	2nd term	
102	Frederick G. Barry	D	MS-04	March 4, 1885	2nd term	Left the House in 1889.
103	Archibald M. Bliss	D	NY-05	March 4, 1885; Previous service, 1875–1883.	6th term*	Left the House in 1889.
104	Franklin Bound	R	PA-14	March 4, 1885	2nd term	Left the House in 1889.
105	William Campbell Preston Breckinridge	D	KY-07	March 4, 1885	2nd term	
106	Charles Elwood Brown	R	OH-02	March 4, 1885	2nd term	Left the House in 1889.
107	James Buchanan	R	NJ-02	March 4, 1885	2nd term	
108	Frank Charles Bunnell	R	PA-15	March 4, 1885; Previous service, 1872–1873.	3rd term*	Left the House in 1889.
109	Julius C. Burrows	R	MI-04	March 4, 1885; Previous service, 1873–1875 and 1879–1883.	5th term**	
110	Benjamin Butterworth	R	OH-01	March 4, 1885; Previous service, 1879–1883.	4th term*	
111	William D. Bynum	D	IN-07	March 4, 1885	2nd term	
112	Lucien B. Caswell	R	WI-01	March 4, 1885; Previous service, 1875–1883.	6th term*	
113	Thomas C. Catchings	D	MS-03	March 4, 1885	2nd term	
114	Barnes Compton	D	MD-05	March 4, 1885	2nd term	
115	Edwin H. Conger	R	IA-07	March 4, 1885	2nd term	
116	William C. Cooper	R	OH-09	March 4, 1885	2nd term	
117	William H. H. Cowles	D	NC-08	March 4, 1885	2nd term	
118	William H. Crain	D	TX-07	March 4, 1885	2nd term	
119	Ira Davenport	R	NY-29	March 4, 1885	2nd term	Left the House in 1889.
120	Alexander C. Davidson	D	AL-04	March 4, 1885	2nd term	Left the House in 1889.
121	George Washington Emery Dorsey	R	NE-03	March 4, 1885	2nd term	
122	Charles Dougherty	D	FL-02	March 4, 1885	2nd term	Left the House in 1889.
123	John M. Farquhar	R	NY-32	March 4, 1885	2nd term	
124	Charles N. Felton	R	CA-05	March 4, 1885	2nd term	Left the House in 1889.
125	Spencer O. Fisher	D	MI-10	March 4, 1885	2nd term	Left the House in 1889.
126	William E. Fuller	R	IA-04	March 4, 1885	2nd term	Left the House in 1889.
127	Jacob Harold Gallinger	R	NH-02	March 4, 1885	2nd term	Left the House in 1889.
128	Edward J. Gay	D	LA-03	March 4, 1885	2nd term	
129	Presley T. Glass	D	TN-09	March 4, 1885	2nd term	Left the House in 1889.
130	Charles Hopper Gibson	D	MD-01	March 4, 1885	2nd term	
131	John Milton Glover	D	MO-09	March 4, 1885	2nd term	Left the House in 1889.
132	Charles H. Grosvenor	R	OH-15	March 4, 1885	2nd term	
133	William W. Grout	R	VT-02	March 4, 1885; Previous service, 1881–1883.	3rd term*	
134	Edward D. Hayden	R	MA-05	March 4, 1885	2nd term	Left the House in 1889.
135	John T. Heard	D	MO-06	March 4, 1885	2nd term	
136	John S. Henderson	D	NC-07	March 4, 1885	2nd term	
137	Binger Hermann	R	OR	March 4, 1885	2nd term	
138	John Andrew Hiestand	R	PA-09	March 4, 1885	2nd term	Left the House in 1889.
139	George Hires	R	NJ-01	March 4, 1885	2nd term	Left the House in 1889.
140	Jonas G. Howard	D	IN-03	March 4, 1885	2nd term	Left the House in 1889.
141	John E. Hutton	D	MO-07	March 4, 1885	2nd term	Left the House in 1889.
142	Oscar Lawrence Jackson	R	PA-24	March 4, 1885	2nd term	Left the House in 1889.
143	James T. Johnston	R	IN-08	March 4, 1885	2nd term	Left the House in 1889.
144	Thomas D. Johnston	D	NC-09	March 4, 1885	2nd term	Left the House in 1889.
145	Polk Laffoon	D	KY-02	March 4, 1885	2nd term	Left the House in 1889.
146	Robert M. La Follette Sr.	R	WI-03	March 4, 1885	2nd term	
147	Silas Z. Landes	D	IL-16	March 4, 1885	2nd term	Left the House in 1889.
148	Frank Lawler	D	IL-02	March 4, 1885	2nd term	
149	Herman Lehlbach	R	NJ-06	March 4, 1885	2nd term	
150	Joseph Lyman	R	IA-09	March 4, 1885	2nd term	Left the House in 1889.
151	Peter P. Mahoney	D	NY-04	March 4, 1885	2nd term	Left the House in 1889.
152	James B. McCreary	D	KY-08	March 4, 1885	2nd term	
153	Joseph McKenna	R	CA-03	March 4, 1885	2nd term	
154	William McKinley	R	OH-18	March 4, 1885; Previous service, 1877–1884.	5th term*	
155	Truman A. Merriman	D	NY-11	March 4, 1885	2nd term	Left the House in 1889.
156	Seth C. Moffatt	R	MI-11	March 4, 1885	2nd term	Died on December 22, 1887.
157	James B. Morgan	D	MS-02	March 4, 1885	2nd term	
158	William W. Morrow	R	CA-04	March 4, 1885	2nd term	
159	John R. Neal	D	TN-03	March 4, 1885	2nd term	Left the House in 1889.
160	Thomas M. Norwood	D	GA-01	March 4, 1885	2nd term	Left the House in 1889.
161	James O'Donnell	R	MI-03	March 4, 1885	2nd term	
162	Edwin Sylvanus Osborne	R	PA	March 4, 1885	2nd term	
163	Joseph H. Outhwaite	D	OH-13	March 4, 1885	2nd term	
164	William D. Owen	R	IN-10	March 4, 1885	2nd term	
165	William H. Perry	D	SC-04	March 4, 1885	2nd term	
166	James N. Pidcock	D	NJ-04	March 4, 1885	2nd term	Left the House in 1889.
167	Ralph Plumb	R	IL-08	March 4, 1885	2nd term	Left the House in 1889.
168	James D. Richardson	D	TN-05	March 4, 1885	2nd term	
169	Jacob Romeis	R	OH-10	March 4, 1885	2nd term	Left the House in 1889.
170	John G. Sawyer	R	NY-31	March 4, 1885	2nd term	
171	Joseph D. Sayers	D	TX-10	March 4, 1885	2nd term	
172	William Lawrence Scott	D	PA-27	March 4, 1885	2nd term	Left the House in 1889.
173	Frank T. Shaw	D	MD-02	March 4, 1885	2nd term	Left the House in 1889.
174	William Henry Sowden	D	PA-10	March 4, 1885	2nd term	Left the House in 1889.
175	William G. Stahlnecker	D	NY-14	March 4, 1885	2nd term	
176	William J. Stone	D	MO-12	March 4, 1885	2nd term	
177	William Johnson Stone	D	KY-01	March 4, 1885	2nd term	
178	George G. Symes	R	CO	March 4, 1885	2nd term	Left the House in 1889.
179	Timothy E. Tarsney	D	MI-08	March 4, 1885	2nd term	Left the House in 1889.
180	William P. Taulbee	D	KY-10	March 4, 1885	2nd term	Left the House in 1889.
181	Ormsby B. Thomas	R	WI-07	March 4, 1885	2nd term	
182	Albert C. Thompson	R	OH-11	March 4, 1885	2nd term	
183	William H. Wade	R	MO-13	March 4, 1885	2nd term	
184	William Warner	R	MO-05	March 4, 1885	2nd term	Left the House in 1889.
185	James B. Weaver	G	IA-06	March 4, 1885; Previous service, 1879–1881.	3rd term*	Left the House in 1889.
186	John B. Weber	R	NY-33	March 4, 1885	2nd term	Left the House in 1889.
187	George West	R	NY-20	March 4, 1885; Previous service, 1881–1883.	3rd term*	Left the House in 1889.
188	Joseph Wheeler	D	AL-08	March 4, 1885; Previous service, 1881–1882 and 1883.	4th term**	
189	William Woodburn	R	NV	March 4, 1885; Previous service, 1875–1877.	3rd term*	Left the House in 1889.
190	Timothy J. Campbell	D	NY-08	November 3, 1885	2nd term	Left the House in 1889.
191	Albert J. Hopkins	R	IL-05	December 7, 1885	2nd term	
192	Thomas Chipman McRae	D	AR-03	December 7, 1885	2nd term	
193	Thomas R. Hudd	D	WI-05	March 8, 1886	2nd term	Left the House in 1889.
194	Samuel S. Cox	D	NY-09	November 2, 1886; Previous service, 1857–1865, 1869–1873 and 1873–1885.	15th term***	
195	Harry Welles Rusk	D	MD-03	November 2, 1886	2nd term	
196	Henry Bacon	D	NY-15	December 6, 1886	2nd term	Left the House in 1889.
197	Joseph Abbott	D	TX-06	March 4, 1887	1st term	
198	Edward P. Allen	R	MI-02	March 4, 1887	1st term	
199	Albert R. Anderson	R	IA-08	March 4, 1887	1st term	Left the House in 1889.
200	Chapman L. Anderson	D	MS-05	March 4, 1887	1st term	
201	George A. Anderson	D	IL-12	March 4, 1887	1st term	Left the House in 1889.
202	Warren O. Arnold	R	RI-02	March 4, 1887	1st term	
203	Jehu Baker	R	IL-18	March 4, 1887; Previous service, 1865–1869.	3rd term*	Left the House in 1889.
204	John H. Bankhead	D	AL-06	March 4, 1887	1st term	
205	Marion Biggs	D	CA-02	March 4, 1887	1st term	
206	Melvin M. Boothman	R	OH-06	March 4, 1887	1st term	
207	George E. Bowden	R	VA-02	March 4, 1887	1st term	
208	Henry Bowen	R	VA-09	March 4, 1887; Previous service, 1883–1885.	2nd term*	Left the House in 1889.
209	Mark S. Brewer	R	MI-06	March 4, 1887; Previous service, 1877–1881.	3rd term*	
210	John M. Brower	R	NC-05	March 4, 1887	1st term	
211	John R. Brown	R	VA-05	March 4, 1887	1st term	Left the House in 1889.
212	Thomas H. B. Browne	R	VA-01	March 4, 1887	1st term	
213	Lloyd Bryce	D	NY-07	March 4, 1887	1st term	Left the House in 1889.
214	Charles R. Buckalew	D	PA-11	March 4, 1887	1st term	
215	Edward Burnett	D	MA-09	March 4, 1887	1st term	Left the House in 1889.
216	Roderick R. Butler	R	TN-01	March 4, 1887; Previous service, 1867–1875.	5th term*	Left the House in 1889.
217	Henry Hull Carlton	D	GA-08	March 4, 1887	1st term	
218	Asher G. Caruth	D	KY-05	March 4, 1887	1st term	
219	Joseph B. Cheadle	R	IN-09	March 4, 1887	1st term	
220	John Logan Chipman	D	MI-01	March 4, 1887	1st term	
221	Charles B. Clark	R	WI-06	March 4, 1887	1st term	
222	James E. Cobb	D	AL-05	March 4, 1887	1st term	
223	William Bourke Cockran	D	NY-12	March 4, 1887	1st term	Left the House in 1889.
224	William Cogswell	R	MA-07	March 4, 1887	1st term	
225	James S. Cothran	D	SC-03	March 4, 1887	1st term	
226	George W. Crouse	R	OH-20	March 4, 1887	1st term	Left the House in 1889.
227	Amos J. Cummings	D	NY-06	March 4, 1887	1st term	Left the House in 1889.
228	John Dalzell	R	PA-22	March 4, 1887	1st term	
229	Smedley Darlington	R	PA-06	March 4, 1887	1st term	
230	Milton De Lano	R	NY-26	March 4, 1887	1st term	
231	William Elliott	D	SC-07	March 4, 1887	1st term	
232	Benjamin A. Enloe	D	TN-08	March 4, 1887	1st term	
233	Hugh F. Finley	R	KY-11	March 4, 1887	1st term	
234	Ashbel P. Fitch	D	NY-13	March 4, 1887	1st term	
235	Thomas S. Flood	R	NY-28	March 4, 1887	1st term	
236	Melbourne H. Ford	D	MI-05	March 4, 1887	1st term	Left the House in 1889.
237	Carlos French	D	CT-02	March 4, 1887	1st term	Left the House in 1889.
238	William E. Gaines	R	VA-04	March 4, 1887	1st term	Left the House in 1889.
239	John H. Gear	R	IA-01	March 4, 1887	1st term	
240	William H. Gest	R	IL-11	March 4, 1887	1st term	
241	Miles T. Granger	D	CT-04	March 4, 1887	1st term	Left the House in 1889.
242	Edward W. Greenman	D	NY-18	March 4, 1887	1st term	Left the House in 1889.
243	Thomas Wingfield Grimes	D	GA-04	March 4, 1887	1st term	
244	Norman Hall	D	PA-26	March 4, 1887	1st term	Left the House in 1889.
245	Silas Hare	D	TX-05	March 4, 1887	1st term	
246	Nils P. Haugen	R	WI-08	March 4, 1887	1st term	
247	Walter I. Hayes	D	IA-02	March 4, 1887	1st term	
248	Charles E. Hogg	D	WV-04	March 4, 1887	1st term	Left the House in 1889.
249	Charles E. Hooker	D	MS-07	March 4, 1887; Previous service, 1875–1883.	5th term*	
250	Samuel I. Hopkins	R	VA-06	March 4, 1887	1st term	Left the House in 1889.
251	Stephen T. Hopkins	R	NY-17	March 4, 1887	1st term	Left the House in 1889.
252	Alvin Peterson Hovey	R	IN-01	March 4, 1887	1st term	Resigned on January 17, 1889.
253	W. Godfrey Hunter	R	KY-03	March 4, 1887	1st term	Left the House in 1889.
254	Nicholas T. Kane	D	NY-19	March 4, 1887	1st term	Died on September 14, 1887.
255	John Kean	R	NJ-03	March 4, 1887; Previous service, 1883–1885.	2nd term*	Left the House in 1889.
256	Robert P. Kennedy	R	OH-08	March 4, 1887	1st term	
257	Daniel Kerr	R	IA-05	March 4, 1887	1st term	
258	Constantine B. Kilgore	D	TX-03	March 4, 1887	1st term	
259	Matthew D. Lagan	D	LA-02	March 4, 1887	1st term	Left the House in 1889.
260	William G. Laidlaw	R	NY-34	March 4, 1887	1st term	
261	Edward Lane	D	IL-17	March 4, 1887	1st term	
262	Louis C. Latham	D	NC-01	March 4, 1887; Previous service, 1881–1883.	2nd term*	Left the House in 1889.
263	William Henry Fitzhugh Lee	D	VA-08	March 4, 1887	1st term	
264	John Lind	R	MN-02	March 4, 1887	1st term	
265	Henry Cabot Lodge	R	MA-06	March 4, 1887	1st term	
266	John Lynch	D	PA-12	March 4, 1887	1st term	Left the House in 1889.
267	John L. MacDonald	D	MN-03	March 4, 1887	1st term	Left the House in 1889.
268	James Thompson Maffett	R	PA-25	March 4, 1887	1st term	Left the House in 1889.
269	Levi Maish	D	PA-19	March 4, 1887; Previous service, 1875–1879.	3rd term*	
270	Charles H. Mansur	D	MO-02	March 4, 1887	1st term	
271	William E. Mason	R	IL-03	March 4, 1887	1st term	
272	Charles W. McClammy	D	NC-03	March 4, 1887	1st term	
273	Henry Clay McCormick	R	PA-16	March 4, 1887	1st term	
274	Welty McCullogh	R	PA-21	March 4, 1887	1st term	Left the House in 1889.
275	Luther F. McKinney	D	NH-01	March 4, 1887	1st term	Left the House in 1889.
276	John A. McShane	D	NE-01	March 4, 1887	1st term	Left the House in 1889.
277	John H. Moffitt	R	NY-21	March 4, 1887	1st term	
278	Alexander B. Montgomery	D	KY-04	March 4, 1887	1st term	
279	Littleton W. Moore	D	TX-08	March 4, 1887	1st term	
280	Leopold Morse	D	MA-03	March 4, 1887; Previous service, 1877–1885.	5th term*	Left the House in 1889.
281	Cherubusco Newton	D	LA-05	March 4, 1887	1st term	Left the House in 1889.
282	John Nichols	R	NC-04	March 4, 1887	1st term	Left the House in 1889.
283	Newton W. Nutting	R	NY-27	March 4, 1887; Previous service, 1883–1885.	2nd term*	
284	John H. O'Neall	D	IN-02	March 4, 1887	1st term	
285	John Patton	R	PA-20	March 4, 1887; Previous service, 1861–1863.	2nd term*	Left the House in 1889.
286	John B. Penington	D	DE	March 4, 1887	1st term	
287	James Phelan Jr.	D	TN-10	March 4, 1887	1st term	
288	Philip S. Post	R	IL-10	March 4, 1887	1st term	
289	Jacob J. Pugsley	R	OH-12	March 4, 1887	1st term	
290	Isidor Rayner	D	MD-04	March 4, 1887	1st term	Left the House in 1889.
291	Edmund Rice	D	MN-04	March 4, 1887	1st term	Left the House in 1889.
292	Edward White Robertson	D	LA-06	March 4, 1887; Previous service, 1877–1883.	4th term*	Died on August 2, 1887.
293	Alfred Rowland	D	NC-06	March 4, 1887	1st term	
294	Charles Addison Russell	R	CT-03	March 4, 1887	1st term	
295	John E. Russell	D	MA-10	March 4, 1887	1st term	Left the House in 1889.
296	Edward Scull	R	PA-17	March 4, 1887	1st term	
297	James S. Sherman	R	NY-23	March 4, 1887	1st term	
298	Benjamin F. Shively	D	IN-13	March 4, 1887; Previous service, 1884–1885.	2nd term*	
299	Furnifold McLendel Simmons	D	NC-02	March 4, 1887	1st term	Left the House in 1889.
300	Henry Smith	R	WI-04	March 4, 1887	1st term	Left the House in 1889.
301	Francis B. Spinola	D	NY-10	March 4, 1887	1st term	
302	John D. Stewart	D	GA-05	March 4, 1887	1st term	
303	T. R. Stockdale	D	MS-06	March 4, 1887	1st term	
304	Joseph D. Taylor	R	OH-17	March 4, 1887; Previous service, 1883–1885.	3rd term*	
305	George M. Thomas	R	KY-09	March 4, 1887	1st term	Left the House in 1889.
306	Thomas Larkin Thompson	D	CA-01	March 4, 1887	1st term	Left the House in 1889.
307	Erastus J. Turner	R	KS-06	March 4, 1887	1st term	
308	Robert J. Vance	D	CT-01	March 4, 1887	1st term	Left the House in 1889.
309	William Vandever	R	CA-06	March 4, 1887; Previous service, 1859–1863.	3rd term*	
310	James P. Walker	D	MO-14	March 4, 1887	1st term	
311	Joseph E. Washington	D	TN-06	March 4, 1887	1st term	
312	James Bain White	R	IN-12	March 4, 1887	1st term	Left the House in 1889.
313	Stephen V. White	R	NY-03	March 4, 1887	1st term	Left the House in 1889.
314	Justin Rice Whiting	D	MI-07	March 4, 1887	1st term	
315	Washington C. Whitthorne	D	TN-07	March 4, 1887; Previous service, 1871–1883.	7th term*	
316	Charles Preston Wickham	R	OH-14	March 4, 1887	1st term	
317	David Wilber	R	NY-24	March 4, 1887; Previous service, 1873–1875 and 1879–1881.	3rd term**	
318	Theodore S. Wilkinson	D	LA-01	March 4, 1887	1st term	
319	Elihu S. Williams	R	OH-03	March 4, 1887	1st term	
320	Thomas Wilson	D	MN-01	March 4, 1887	1st term	Left the House in 1889.
321	Robert Morris Yardley	R	PA-07	March 4, 1887	1st term	
322	Samuel S. Yoder	D	OH-04	March 4, 1887	1st term	
323	Jacob Yost	R	VA-10	March 4, 1887	1st term	Left the House in 1889.
	William Harrison Martin	D	TX-02	November 4, 1887	1st term	
	Charles Tracey	D	NY-19	November 8, 1887	1st term	
	James J. Belden	R	NY-25	November 8, 1887	1st term	
	Samuel Matthews Robertson	D	LA-06	December 5, 1887	1st term	
	Henry W. Seymour	R	MI-11	February 14, 1888	1st term	Left the House in 1889.
	Francis B. Posey	R	IN-01	January 29, 1889	1st term	Left the House in 1889.
	Charles F. Booher	D	MO-04	February 19, 1889	1st term	Left the House in 1889.

== Delegates ==
Rank	Delegate	Party	District	Seniority date (Previous service, if any)	No.# of term(s)	Notes
1	John Thomas Caine	D	UT	November 7, 1882	4th term	
2	Joseph M. Carey	R	WY	March 4, 1885	2nd term	
3	Antonio Joseph	D	NM	March 4, 1885	2nd term	
4	Oscar S. Gifford	R	DAK	March 4, 1885	2nd term	
5	Joseph Toole	D	MT	March 4, 1885	2nd term	
6	Charles Stewart Voorhees	D	WA	March 4, 1885	2nd term	
7	Fred Dubois	R	ID	March 4, 1887	1st term	
8	Marcus A. Smith	D	AZ	March 4, 1887	1st term	

== See also ==
- 50th United States Congress
- List of United States congressional districts
- List of United States senators in the 50th Congress
