= 186th Regiment =

186th Regiment may refer to:

- 186th Field Regiment, Royal Artillery
- 186th Infantry Regiment (United States)
- 186th Paratroopers Regiment "Folgore", Italy

== American Civil War regiments ==
- 186th New York Infantry Regiment
- 186th Ohio Infantry Regiment
- 186th Pennsylvania Infantry Regiment

== See also ==
- 186th (disambiguation)
