= Berwick Hotel =

- U.S. National Register of Historic Places
- U.S. Historic district – Contributing property
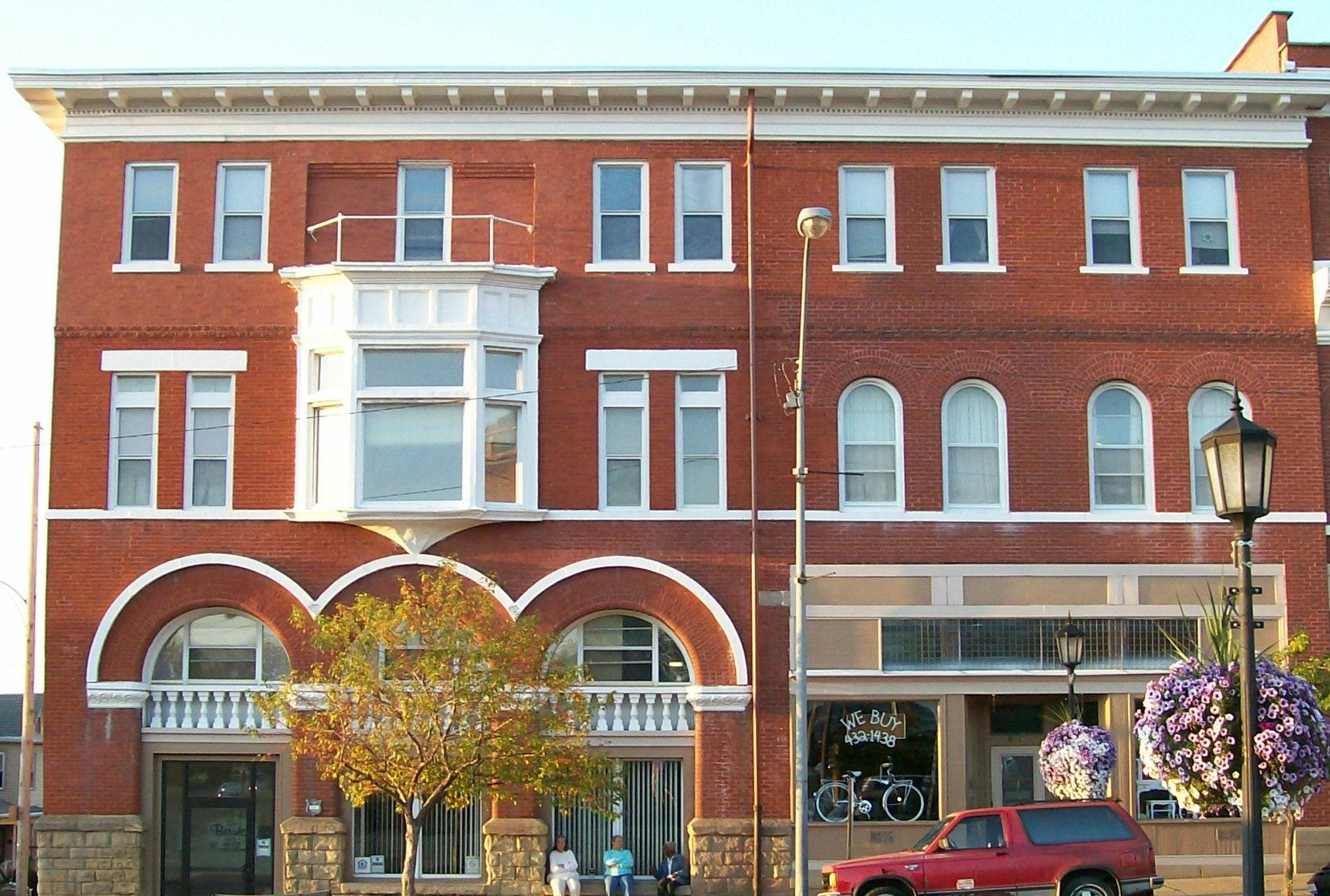
- Front of the hotel

- Location within Ohio Location within the United States
- Location: 600-615 Wheeling Ave., Cambridge, Ohio
- Coordinates: 40°1′30″N 81°35′36″W
- Area: Less than 1 acre (0.40 ha)
- Built: 1892
- Part of: Wheeling Avenue Historic District (ID87000919)
- NRHP reference No.: 83001975
- Added to NRHP: March 29, 1983

The Berwick Hotel is located on the northeast corner of Wheeling Avenue and Sixth Street in Cambridge, Ohio, United States and was built in 1887 for Colonel Joseph D. Taylor in the Second Empire style.

== History ==
The plot of land where the Berwick Hotel was built was bought by Joseph Taylor in 1866. He built his house on the site and lived there until the 1880s when he moved into his Queen Anne style house on the other side of town. The old house was torn down to make room for the larger structure covering the entire lot. Taylor chose the name Berwick from his bride's hometown of North Berwick, Maine. The hotel opened to much celebration on August 16, 1887; it was a Romanesque Revival building.

In November 1891, the hotel was destroyed by fire, but Taylor quickly arranged for the erection of a replacement. At the time, Cambridge was in the middle of a period of prosperity that had continued with little interruption since the first railroad came in the 1850s. Because the hotel sits on a sloped lot, it is irregular in its plan: parts of the building are four stories tall, while others are only three.

In 1983, the hotel was listed on the National Register of Historic Places, qualifying because of its place in local history. It is located within a National Register-listed historic district: the Wheeling Avenue Historic District, designated in 1987, which extends along Wheeling Avenue from Fourth Street to Tenth Street.
