= Albert J. Pearson =

American politician

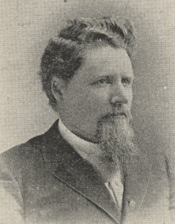

Member of the U.S. House of Representatives from Ohio
- In office March 4, 1891 – March 3, 1895
- Preceded by: Joseph D. Taylor
- Succeeded by: Lorenzo Danford
- Constituency: 17th district (1891–1893); 16th district (1893–1895)

Member of the Ohio Senate from the 18th district
- In office January 2, 1882 – January 6, 1884
- Preceded by: Beriah Wilkins
- Succeeded by: William S. Crowell

Personal details
- Born: Albert Jackson Pearson; May 20, 1846 Centerville, Ohio, U.S.
- Died: May 15, 1905 (aged 58) Woodsfield, Ohio, U.S.
- Resting place: Woodsfield Cemetery
- Party: Democratic
- Education: National Normal University

Military service
- Allegiance: United States
- Branch/service: Union Army
- Rank: private
- Unit: 186th Ohio Infantry

Albert Jackson Pearson (May 20, 1846 – May 15, 1905) was an American politician and jurist who was a two-term U.S. Representative from Ohio from 1891 to 1895. He was a veteran of the Civil War.

== Biography ==
Born in Centerville, Ohio, Pearson moved with his parents to Beallsville, Ohio at an early age. He attended the common schools and the normal school at Lebanon, Ohio.

=== Civil War ===
Pearson served as a private in Company I, One Hundred and Eighty-Sixth Regiment, Ohio Volunteer Infantry, during the Civil War.

=== Legal career ===
He was admitted to the bar in 1868 and commenced practice in Woodsfield, Ohio. He served as the prosecuting attorney of Monroe County, Ohio, from 1871 to 1877. He served as member of the Ohio Senate in 1881 and 1882. He was a probate judge of Monroe County from 1884 to 1890.

=== Congress ===
Pearson was elected as a Democrat to the Fifty-second and Fifty-third Congresses (March 4, 1891 - March 3, 1895). He was not a candidate for reelection in 1894 to the Fifty-fourth Congress, and instead resumed the practice of his profession.

=== Death ===
Pearson died in Woodsfield on May 15, 1905, and was interred in Woodsfield Cemetery.

U.S. House of Representatives
| Preceded by Joseph D. Taylor | Member of the U.S. House of Representatives from Ohio's 17th congressional district 1891-1893 | Succeeded by James A. D. Richards |
| Preceded by Lewis P. Ohliger | Member of the U.S. House of Representatives from Ohio's 16th congressional district 1893-1895 | Succeeded by Lorenzo Danford |
