= Nelson H. Van Vorhes =

American journalist

Nelson Holmes Van Vorhes
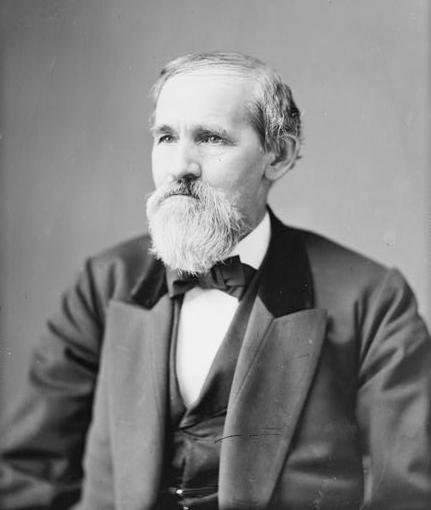

Member of the U.S. House of Representatives from Ohio's 15th district
- In office March 4, 1875 – March 3, 1879
- Preceded by: William P. Sprague
- Succeeded by: George W. Geddes

Member of the Ohio House of Representatives from the Athens County district
- In office December 2, 1850 – January 1, 1854 Serving with H. S. Bundy
- Preceded by: Anselm T. Holcomb, Joseph K. Will
- Succeeded by: Samuel B. Pruden
- In office January 7, 1856 – January 1, 1860
- Preceded by: Samuel B. Pruden
- Succeeded by: A. B. Monahan
- In office January 3, 1870 – January 4, 1874
- Preceded by: William P. Johnson
- Succeeded by: Charles H. Grosvenor

Speaker of the Ohio House
- In office January 1, 1856 – January 3, 1858
- Preceded by: Francis C. LeBlond
- Succeeded by: William Burnham Woods
- In office January 1, 1872 – January 4, 1874
- Preceded by: A. J. Cunningham
- Succeeded by: George L. Converse

Personal details
- Born: January 23, 1822 Washington County, Pennsylvania, U.S.
- Died: December 4, 1882 (aged 60) Athens, Ohio, U.S.
- Party: Republican
- Other political affiliations: Whig

Nelson Holmes Van Vorhes (January 23, 1822 – December 4, 1882) was an American newspaperman and politician who served two terms as a U.S. representative from Ohio from 1875 to 1879.

== Biography ==
Born in Washington County, Pennsylvania, Van Vorhes moved to Athens County, Ohio, in 1832 and engaged in agricultural pursuits. Apprenticed to a printer for six years. He was editor and proprietor of The Athens Messenger 1844-1861. He served as member of the State House of Representatives 1850-1872 and served four years as speaker.

Van Vorhes lost the election for Ohio Secretary of State as a Whig in 1853. Van Vorhes was elected probate judge in 1854, but resigned. He was an unsuccessful candidate for election in 1858 to the Thirty-sixth Congress. He served as delegate to the Republican National Convention in 1860. He entered the Union Army as a private in 1861 and was mustered out as colonel of the 92nd Ohio Infantry in the Summer of 1863, when his health failed. His father was: Abraham Van Vorhes who also served in the Ohio General Assembly and Minnesota Territorial Legislature and his brother was: Andrew J. Van Vorhes who served in the Minnesota House of Representatives.

Van Vorhes was elected as a Republican to the Forty-fourth and Forty-fifth Congresses (March 4, 1875 – March 3, 1879). He was an unsuccessful candidate for reelection in 1878 to the Forty-sixth Congress. He died in Athens, Ohio, December 4, 1882, and was interred in West Union Street Cemetery.

U.S. House of Representatives
Preceded by William P. Sprague	United States Representative from Ohio's 15th congressional district 1875–1879	Succeeded by George W. Geddes
