= 186th Division =

186th Division may refer to:

- 186th Division (1st Formation) (People's Republic of China), 1949–1952
- 186th Rifle Division (1939 formation), Soviet Union
- 186th Rifle Division (1941 formation), Soviet Union

== See also ==
- List of military divisions by number
- 186th Regiment (disambiguation)
- 186th (disambiguation)
