= Abraham Van Vorhes =

American politician (1793–1879)

Major Abraham Van Vorhes
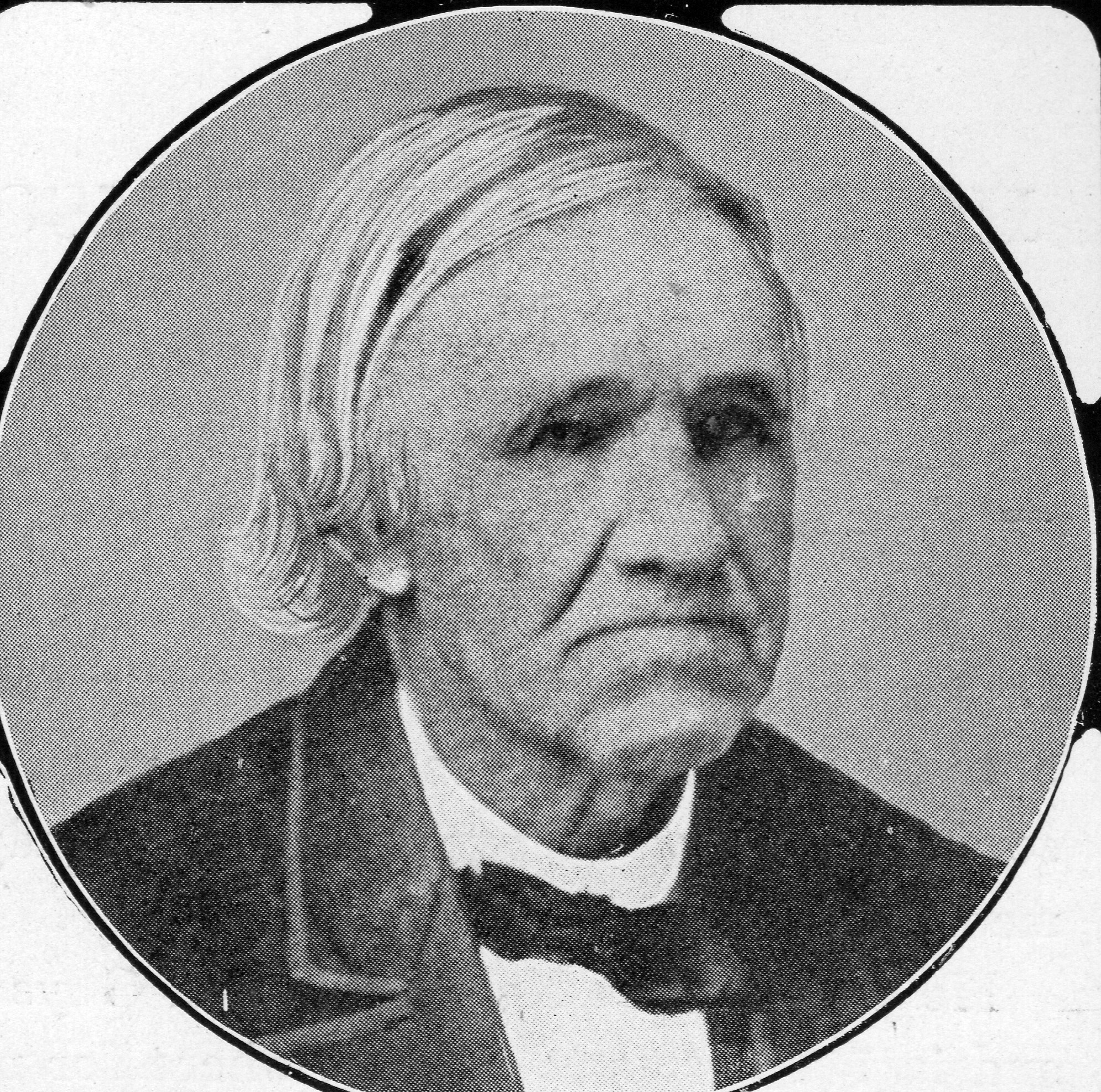
- Van Vorhes c. 1870

Member of the Minnesota Territorial House of Representatives from the 1st district
- In office January 2, 1856 – January 6, 1857

Member of the Ohio Senate from Athens County
- In office 1842–1846

Member of the Ohio House of Representatives from Athens County
- In office 1840–18??

Personal details
- Born: December 2, 1793 Washington County, Pennsylvania, U.S.
- Died: January 24, 1879 (aged 85) Stillwater, Minnesota, U.S.
- Resting place: Fairview Cemetery
- Party: Whig, Republican
- Children: Nelson H. Van Vorhes; Andrew J. Van Vorhes
- Occupation: Gunsmith, politician, postmaster, mechanic, newspaper editor/publisher, surveyor, justice
- Committees: Rail Roads and Turnpikes (Ohio Senate)

Military service
- Branch/service: Pennsylvania militia
- Rank: Major

Abraham Van Vorhes (December 2, 1793 – January 24, 1879; known commonly by his military rank as Major Van Vorhes) was an American politician, surveyor and pioneer.

== Pennsylvania and Ohio ==
Born in Washington County, Pennsylvania, Abraham Van Vorhes married Mary W. Vorhees in 1817.

He served in the Pennsylvania militia and acquired the rank of major before moving to Alexander Township, Ohio in 1832 and then to Athens, Ohio in 1838, where he was a mechanic and editor of the Hocking Valley Gazette (later the Athens Messenger). While in Athens, Van Vorhes served as Athens County Treasurer and Surveyor.

From 1835 to 1839, he was postmaster for the Hebbardsville post office.

A member of the Whig Party and later the Republican Party, he was elected to the Ohio House of Representatives in 1840 and was later elected to the Ohio Senate in October 1842, where he served four terms.

== Minnesota ==
In 1849, President Zachary Taylor appointed Van Vorhes register of the United States Land Office, in Stillwater, Minnesota; he later arrived in October of that year.

In 1853, Minnesota Territorial Governor Alexander Ramsey appointed Van Vorhes Minnesota Territorial Auditor. In 1856, Van Vorhes served in the Minnesota Territorial House of Representatives, and from 1859, 1865, and 1866, he served as a justice for the city of Stillwater, Minnesota.

He was appointed as postmaster for Stillwater in 1861 by President Abraham Lincoln.

Van Vorhes died on January 24, 1879, in Stillwater at the age of 85.

== Personal life ==
Van Vorhes had eight children with Mary, two of whom were Nelson H. Van Vorhes, who served in the Ohio General Assembly and the United States House of Representatives, and Andrew J. Van Vorhes, who served in the Minnesota House of Representatives.

He was a member of the Presbyterian Church for most of his life, having joined in 1832 when he moved to Ohio.

== See also ==
- 7th Minnesota Territorial Legislature

== Bibliography ==
- Walker, Charles Manning (1869). History of Athens County, Ohio, and Incidentally of the Ohio Land Company and the First Settlement of the State and Marietta. Cincinnati, OH: Robert Clarke & Co.
- History of Hocking Valley, Ohio. Chicago: Inter-State Publishing Co. 1883.
- Easton, Augustus B., ed. (1909). History of the Saint Croix Valley. Vol. I. Chicago: H.C. Cooper, Jr. & Co.
