= Andrew J. Van Vorhes =

American politician (1824–1873)

Member of the Minnesota House of Representatives from the 1st district
- In office December 7, 1859 – January 7, 1861

Personal details
- Born: Andrew Jackson Van Vorhes; January 24, 1824 Washington County, Pennsylvania, U.S.
- Died: January 10, 1873 (aged 48) Stillwater, Minnesota, U.S.
- Parent: Abraham Van Vorhes (father)
- Relatives: Nelson H. Van Vorhes (brother)
- Occupation: Politician, newspaper editor

Military service
- Allegiance: United States
- Branch/service: United States Army (Union army)
- Years of service: 1863–1865
- Rank: Quartermaster
- Battles/wars: American Civil War

Andrew Jackson Van Vorhes (January 24, 1824 – January 10, 1873) was an American politician and newspaper editor.

Born in Washington County, Pennsylvania, his father was Abraham Van Vorhes and his brother was Nelson H. Van Vorhes. He worked in his father's paper the Hocking Valley Gazette in Athens, Ohio. Then he and his brother bought the paper and changed the name to The Athens Messenger. He was recording clerk in the Ohio General Assembly. In 1855, Van Vorhes moved to Stillwater, Minnesota Territory, where he started the Stillwater Messenger. He served in the Union Army from 1863 to 1865, during the American Civil War, as a quartermaster. Van Vorhes also served as Indian agent at Fort Ripley in 1862. Then he served a clerk for the Minnesota Supreme Court. He also served in the Minnesota House of Representatives from 1859 to 1860. He died in Stillwater, Minnesota.
