= Eliakim Hastings Moore =

Eliakim Hastings Moore may refer to:

- Eliakim H. Moore, U.S. Congressman from Ohio
- E. H. Moore, Eliakim Hastings Moore, (1862 – 1932) - American mathematician
