= John G. Warwick =

American politician (1830–1892)

John George Warwick
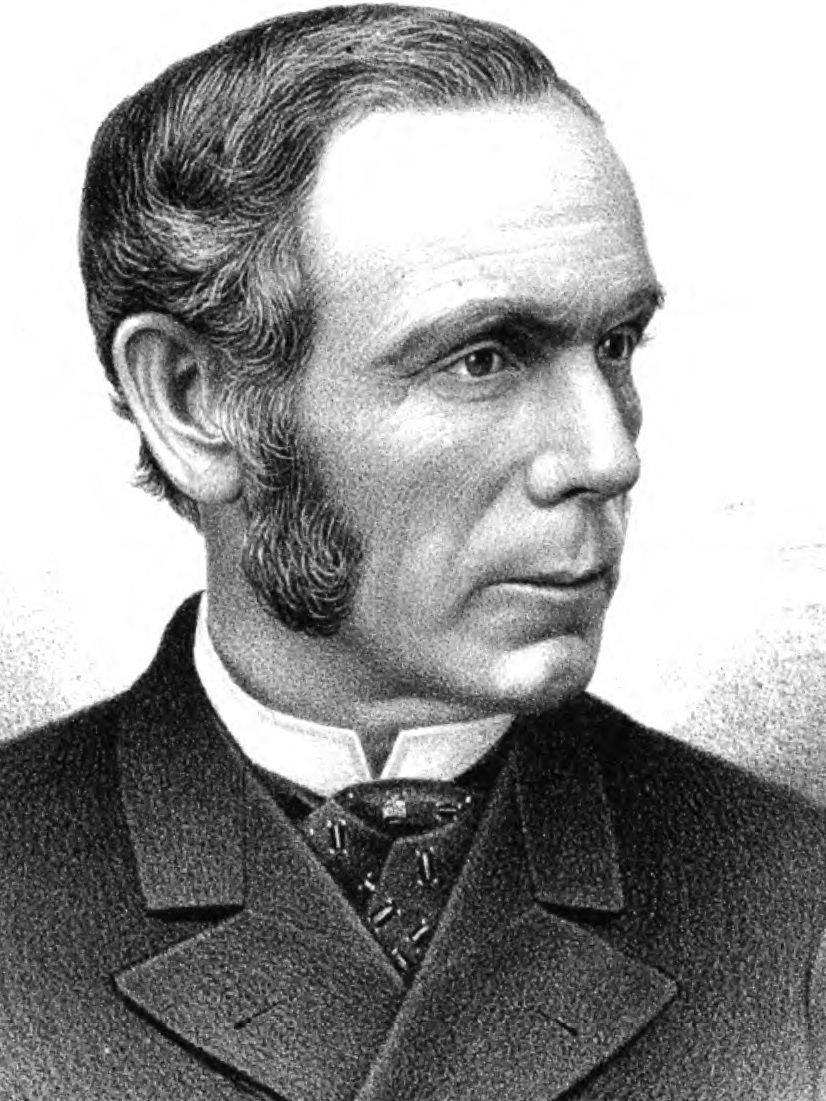

Member of the U.S. House of Representatives from Ohio's 16th district
- In office March 4, 1891 – August 14, 1892
- Preceded by: James W. Owens
- Succeeded by: Lewis P. Ohliger

17th Lieutenant Governor of Ohio
- In office January 14, 1884 – January 11, 1886
- Governor: George Hoadly
- Preceded by: Rees G. Richards
- Succeeded by: Robert P. Kennedy

Personal details
- Born: December 23, 1830 County Tyrone, Ireland, U.K.
- Died: August 14, 1892 (aged 61) Washington, D.C., U.S.
- Resting place: Massillon Cemetery, Massillon, Ohio
- Party: Democratic
- Spouse: Maria E. Lavake (m. 1864)

John George Warwick (December 23, 1830 – August 14, 1892) was an American politician who served briefly as a U.S. representative from Ohio from 1891 until his death in 1892

== Early life ==
John George Warwick was born on December 23, 1830, in County Tyrone on the island of Ireland. He attended the common schools of his native land. Warwick immigrated with his brothers Robert and William to the United States about 1850 and resided in Philadelphia, Pennsylvania, for a short time.

== Career ==
Warwick moved to Navarre, Ohio, and became a bookkeeper and clerk in a dry-goods establishment, and moved to Massillon, Ohio in 1853, and opened a dry-goods store. He worked in the dry goods store for over 20 years. He was the principal owner of Sippo Valley Mills and in the later 1860s he engaged in railroad interests. He was a director of the Massillon & Cleveland Railroad, the Wheeling & Lake Erie Railroad, and the Cleveland & Marietta Railroad. He was also involved in coal mining and owned several farms. In 1872, he retired from the dry goods industry. He was organizer and president of the Massillon Building and Loan Association. He was director of the Massillon Water Company.

Warwick was elected as the 17th lieutenant governor of Ohio on the ticket of Democratic governor George Hoadly and served from 1884 to 1886. He was an unsuccessful candidate for reelection in 1886. Warwick was elected as a Democrat to the Fifty-second Congress and served from March 4, 1891, until his death. He defeated William McKinley by 302 votes in an intensely fought race that gained national attention. McKinley was in favor of an import tariff on tinware. Warwick sent fake peddlers out into the rural 16th district who charged 50 cents for 25 cent tinware goods. When asked why the prices were so high, the peddlers replied: "This is the result of McKinley's tariff!".

== Death ==
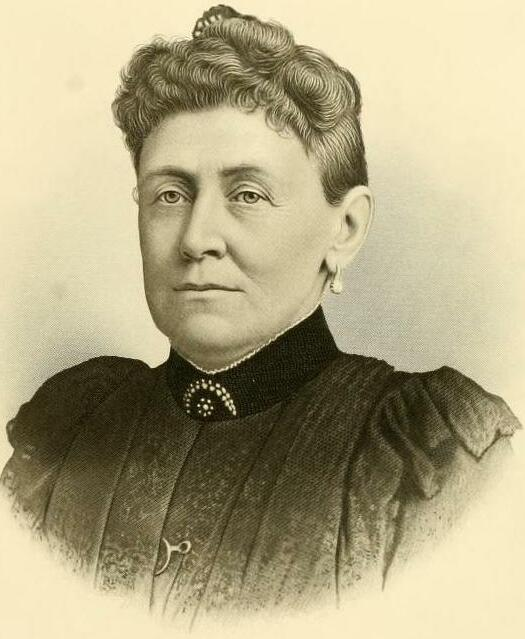
Portrait of Maria E. Warwick in 1904 publication

Warwick married Mrs. Maria E. Lavake of Karthaus in 1864. He had a son, Warrington K. L. Warwick was friends with New York Senator David B. Hill.

On August 2, 1892, Warwick attended a board of directors meeting for the Wheeling & Lake Erie Railroad Company in New York City. While there, he contracted food poisoning. Warwick died on August 14, 1892, at Riggs House in Washington, D.C. He was interred in Protestant Cemetery, Massillon, Ohio.

== See also ==
- List of members of the United States Congress who died in office (1790–1899)

Political offices
Preceded by Rees G. Richards	Lieutenant Governor of Ohio; 1884–1886	Succeeded by Robert P. Kennedy
U.S. House of Representatives
Preceded by James W. Owens	Member of the U.S. House of Representatives from Ohio's 16th congressional district 1891-1892	Succeeded by Lewis P. Ohliger
