= Tobias A. Plants =

American politician

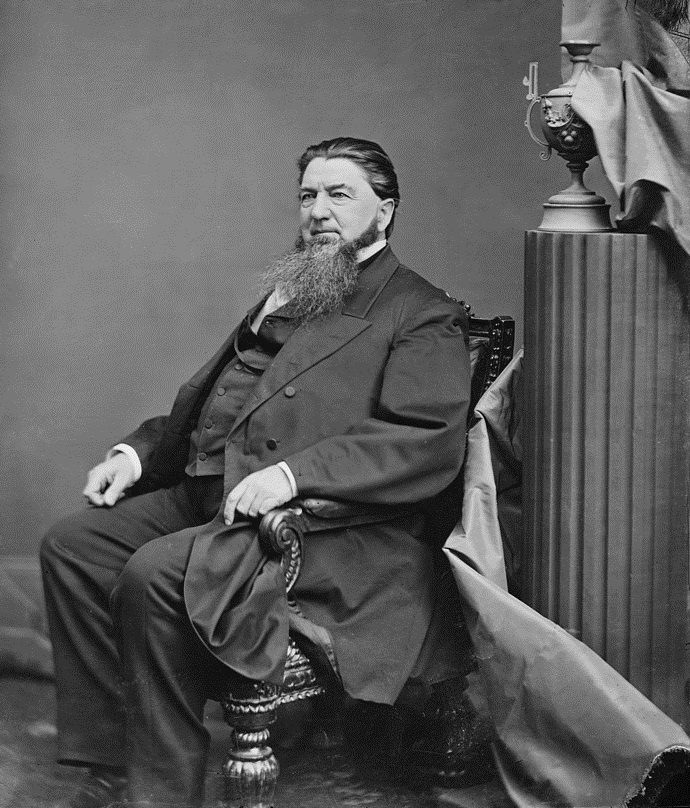

Member of the U.S. House of Representatives from Ohio's 15th district
- In office March 4, 1865 – March 3, 1869
- Preceded by: James R. Morris
- Succeeded by: Eliakim H. Moore

Member of the Ohio House of Representatives from the Meigs County district
- In office January 4, 1858 – January 5, 1862
- Preceded by: Alfred Thompson
- Succeeded by: Edward Tiffany

Personal details
- Born: Tobias Avery Plants; March 17, 1811 Sewickley, Pennsylvania, U.S.
- Died: June 19, 1887 (aged 76) Pomeroy, Ohio, U.S.
- Resting place: Beech Grove Cemetery, Pomeroy
- Party: Republican

Tobias Avery Plants (March 17, 1811 – June 19, 1887) was an American lawyer, newspaperman, and politician who served two terms as a U.S. representative from Ohio from 1865 to 1869.

== Biography ==
Born at Sewickley, Pennsylvania, Plants apprenticed to a saddler at the age of twelve. He received a limited common school education.

=== Early career ===
He attended Beaver College, Meadville, Pennsylvania. He taught school, and while teaching studied law with Edwin M. Stanton in the office of Judge David Powell at Steubenville, Ohio. He was admitted to the bar and commenced practice in Athens, Ohio, in 1846, but soon moved to Pomeroy, Ohio.

He served as member of the State house of representatives from 1858 to 1861.

He was owner and publisher of the Pomeroy Weekly Telegraph about 1860.

=== Congress ===
Plants was elected as a Republican to the Thirty-ninth and Fortieth Congresses (March 4, 1865 - March 3, 1869). He was not a candidate for renomination in 1868.

=== Later career and death ===
He served as Common Pleas Judge in Meigs County from 1873 to 1875, when he resigned to resume the practice of law. A presidential elector for Garfield/Arthur in 1880, he served as president of the First City Bank of Pomeroy from 1878 until his death in Pomeroy on June 19, 1887. He was interred in Beech Grove Cemetery.

== Notes ==
U.S. House of Representatives
Preceded by Joseph Burns	United States Representative from Ohio's 15th congressional district 1865–1869	Succeeded by Eliakim H. Moore
