= George W. Geddes =

American politician (1824–1892)

George Washington Geddes
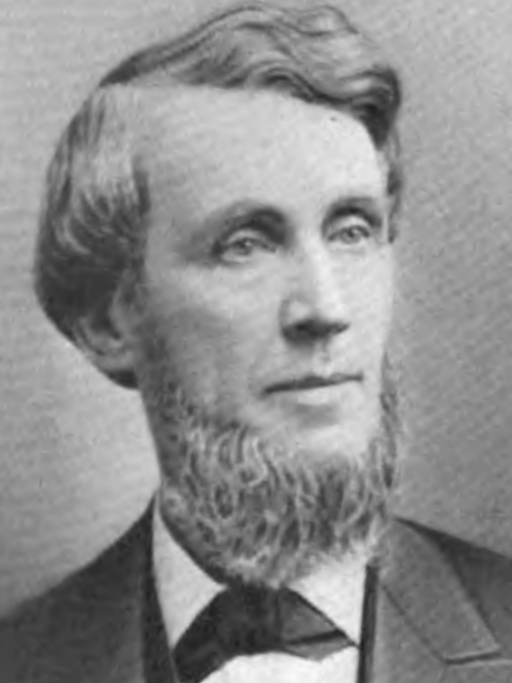

Chairman of the House Democratic Caucus
- In office March 4, 1883 – March 3, 1885
- Speaker: John G. Carlisle
- Preceded by: John F. House (1881)
- Succeeded by: John R. Tucker

Member of the U.S. House of Representatives from Ohio
- In office March 4, 1879 – March 3, 1887
- Preceded by: Nelson H. Van Vorhes
- Succeeded by: Beriah Wilkins
- Constituency: 15th district (1879-1881); 14th district (1881-1885); 16th district (1885-1887)

Personal details
- Born: July 16, 1824 Mount Vernon, Ohio, U.S.
- Died: November 9, 1892 (aged 68) Mansfield, Ohio, U.S.
- Party: Democratic
- Spouse(s): Nancy Lennon, Amelia Gass
- Children: 3

George Washington Geddes (July 16, 1824 – November 9, 1892) was an American lawyer, jurist, and politician who served as a U.S. representative from Ohio for four terms from 1879 to 1887.

== Early life and career ==
Born in Mount Vernon, Ohio, Geddes attended the common schools. He studied law under Columbus Delano. He was admitted to the bar in July 1845 and practiced. He served as judge of the court of common pleas of the sixth judicial district in 1856. He was reelected in 1861.

Geddes was again elected in 1868, and served until 1873. He resumed the practice of law. He was an unsuccessful Democratic candidate for judge of the Supreme Court of Ohio in 1871. He resumed the practice of law in Mansfield.

== Congress ==
Geddes was elected as a Democrat to the Forty-sixth and to the three succeeding Congresses (March 4, 1879 – March 3, 1887). He served as chairman of the Committee on War Claims (Forty-eighth and Forty-ninth Congresses). He declined to be a candidate for reelection in 1886 to the Fiftieth Congress. He resumed the practice of his profession.

== Family life ==
Married Nancy Lennon of Ashland County, Ohio in 1848, and had three sons, Samuel, James and George. Nancy died in 1878, and Geddes married Amelia Gass, December 1880.

Geddes was a trustee of Ohio Wesleyan University and Mount Union College. He was a Methodist.

== Death ==
He died in Mansfield, Ohio, November 9, 1892. He was interred in Mansfield Cemetery.

== Sources ==
- United States Congress. "George W. Geddes (id: G000115)". Biographical Directory of the United States Congress.

U.S. House of Representatives
Preceded by Nelson H. Van Vorhes	Member of the U.S. House of Representatives from Ohio's 15th congressional district 1879-1881	Succeeded by Rufus Dawes
Preceded by Gibson Atherton	Member of the U.S. House of Representatives from Ohio's 14th congressional district 1881-1885	Succeeded by Charles H. Grosvenor
Preceded by Beriah Wilkins	Member of the U.S. House of Representatives from Ohio's 16th congressional district 1885-1887	Succeeded by Beriah Wilkins
