= William P. Sprague =

American politician

William Peter Sprague
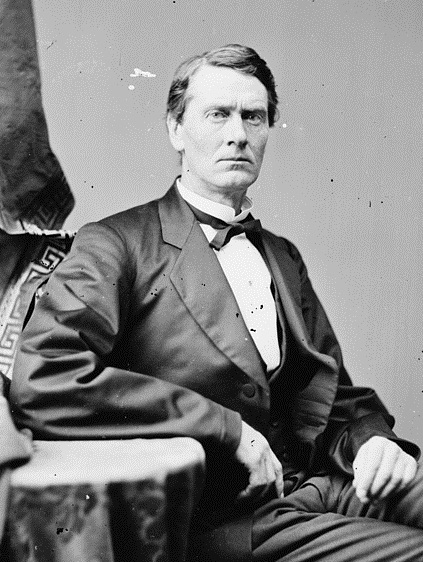

Member of the U.S. House of Representatives from Ohio's 15th district
- In office March 4, 1871 – March 3, 1875
- Preceded by: Eliakim H. Moore
- Succeeded by: Nelson H. Van Vorhes

Member of the Ohio Senate from the 14th district
- In office January 2, 1860 – January 3, 1864
- Preceded by: David Greene
- Succeeded by: William F. Curtis

Personal details
- Born: May 21, 1827 Malta, Ohio, US
- Died: March 3, 1899 (aged 71) McConnelsville, Ohio, US
- Resting place: Riverview Cemetery, McConnelsville
- Party: Republican

William Peter Sprague (May 21, 1827 – March 3, 1899) was a businessman, banker, politician, and a two-term U.S. representative from Ohio, serving from 1871 to 1875.

== Biography ==
Sprague was born in Malta in Morgan County, Ohio, and attended the country schools. His childhood home is located at 191 South Main Street in Malta. He engaged in mercantile pursuits when quite young and continued in active business until 1864.

He was a member of the Ohio Senate from 1860 to 1863 during the American Civil War. He moved to McConnelsville, Ohio, in 1866 and engaged in banking. He was elected as a Republican to the Forty-second and Forty-third Congresses (March 4, 1871 – March 3, 1875). Sprague was not a candidate for renomination in 1874 and subsequently resumed the banking business in Malta.

He died in McConnelsville and was buried in Riverview Cemetery.

U.S. House of Representatives
Preceded by Eliakim H. Moore	United States Representative from Ohio's 15th congressional district 1871–1875	Succeeded by Nelson H. Van Vorhes
