= 88th Ohio Infantry Regiment =

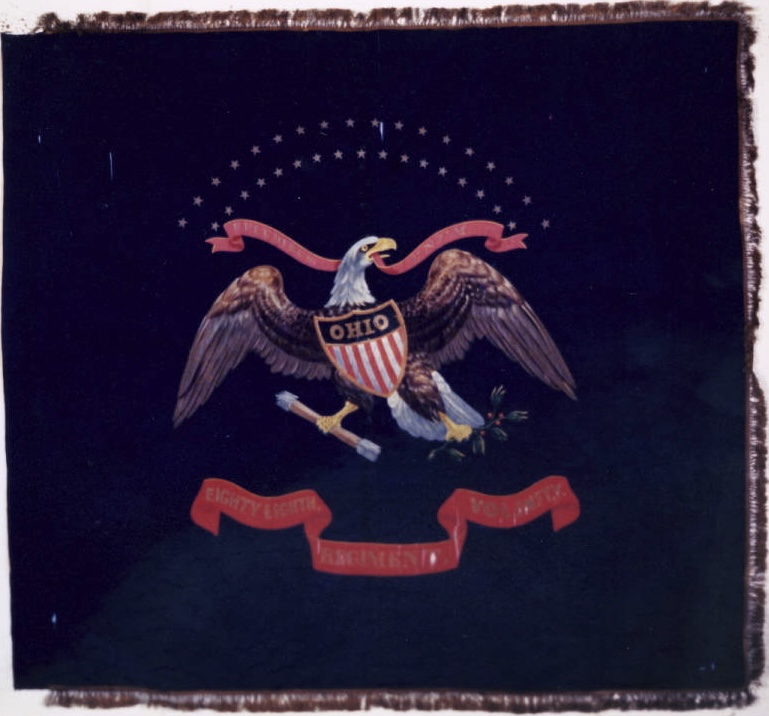
- Flag of the 88th Ohio Infantry
- Active: July 1862 - July 3, 1865
- Country: United States
- Allegiance: Union
- Branch: Infantry
- Engagements: Morgan's Raid; Duty at Camp Chase

Commanders
- Notable commanders: Col. George Washington Neff

The 88th Ohio Infantry Regiment, sometimes 88th Ohio Volunteer Infantry (or 88th OVI) was an infantry regiment in the Union Army during the American Civil War. It was initially known as the "1st Battalion Governor's Guard".

== Service ==
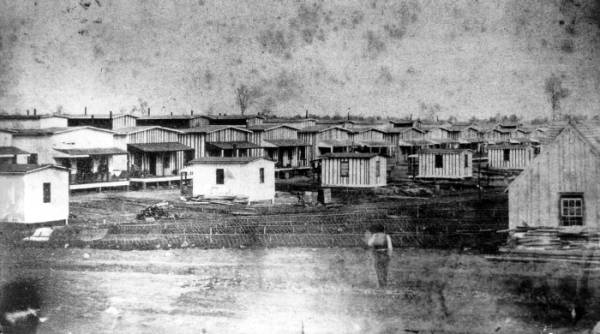
Camp Chase, 1864

The 88th Ohio Infantry was organized at Camp Chase in Columbus, Ohio, in July 1862 and mustered in on October 27, 1862, for three years service under Colonel George Washington Neff.

When Edmund Kirby Smith threatened Cincinnati, Ohio, in September 1862, the 88th moved to Covington, Kentucky, but soon returned to Camp Chase. A detachment then served in western Virginia and Maryland, but returned to Ohio to operate against John Hunt Morgan. The regiment served guard duty at Camp Chase until October 1863, and served at Cincinnati, Ohio, until December 20, 1863. It then returned to Columbus to serve guard duty at Camp Chase until July 1865.

The 88th Ohio mustered out of the service at Camp Chase on July 3, 1865.

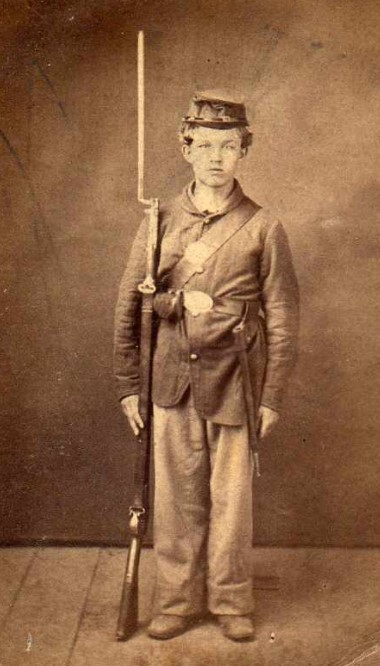
Pvt. Eli Harris, 88th Ohio, in 1863 at 16 years old.

== Casualties ==
The regiment lost a total of 80 enlisted men, all due to disease.

== Commanders ==
- Colonel George Washington Neff

== Notable members ==
- Captain Joseph D. Taylor, Company E - U.S. Representative from Ohio, 1883–1885, 1887–1893

== See also ==
- List of Ohio Civil War units
- Ohio in the Civil War
