= Rees G. Richards =

American politician

Rees Griffith Richards
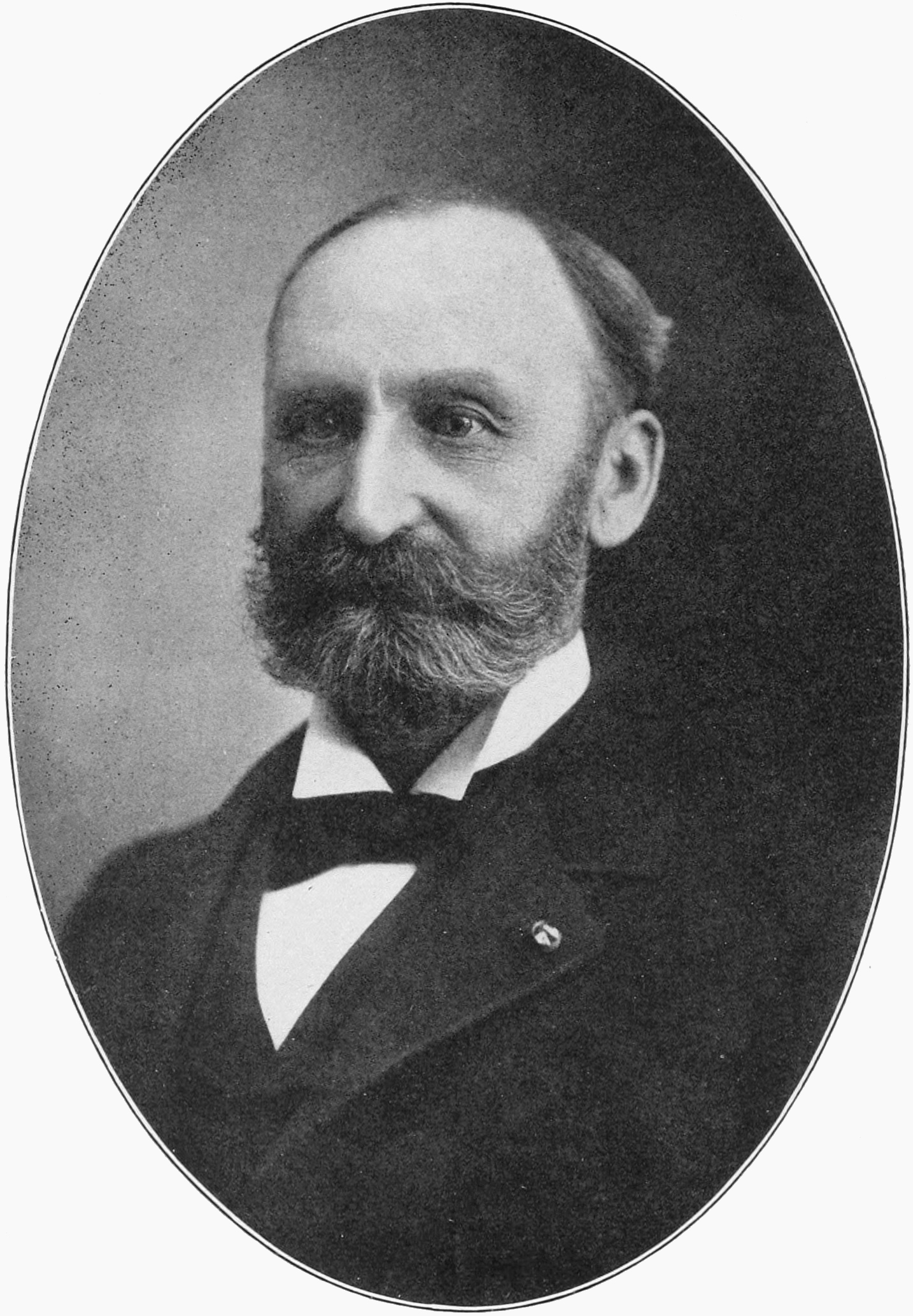
- circa 1912

16th Lieutenant Governor of Ohio
- In office January 9, 1882 – January 14, 1884
- Governor: Charles Foster
- Preceded by: Andrew Hickenlooper
- Succeeded by: John G. Warwick

Member of the Ohio Senate from the 22nd district
- In office January 7, 1878 – January 1, 1882
- Preceded by: J. K. Rukenbrod
- Succeeded by: J. M. Dickinson

Member of the Ohio House of Representatives from the Jefferson County district
- In office January 5, 1874 – January 6, 1878
- Preceded by: Samuel H. Ford
- Succeeded by: Thomas B. Scott

Personal details
- Born: July 22, 1842 Swansea, Wales
- Died: February 10, 1917 (aged 74) Steubenville, Ohio
- Party: Republican
- Spouse(s): Catherine C. Rees; Elizabeth Johnson
- Children: one
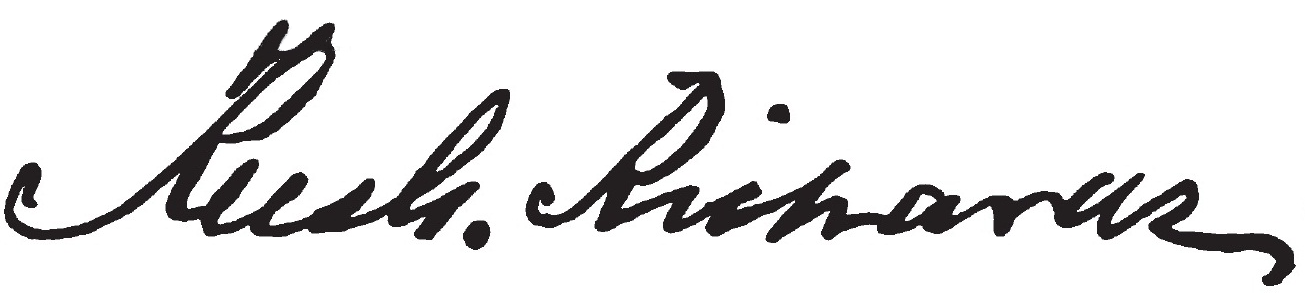
- Signature

Military service
- Allegiance: United States
- Branch/service: United States Army; Union Army
- Years of service: 1861-1865
- Rank: Captain
- Unit: 45th Pennsylvania Infantry

Rees Griffith Richards (July 22, 1842 – February 10, 1917) was an American Republican politician who served as the 16th lieutenant governor of Ohio from 1882 to 1884.

== Early life ==
Richards was born July 22, 1842, near Swansea, Wales, and lived there until age 10. His family then moved to Ontario, Canada, before removing to Tioga County, Pennsylvania.

== Civil War ==
At the outbreak of the U.S. Civil War, he enlisted as a first sergeant in Company G of the 45th Pennsylvania Volunteer Infantry September 18, 1861. He was promoted to second lieutenant July 31, 1862, to captain September 14, 1862. He re-enlisted as a veteran January 1, 1864, and was captured at the Crater, July 30, 1864. He was held prisoner at Asylum Prison Camp near Charleston, South Carolina, until his escape February 16, 1865. He and two colleagues made it to Union lines at Chattanooga, Tennessee March 16, 1865. He was appointed brigade inspector May 11, 1865, and mustered out July 17, 1865.

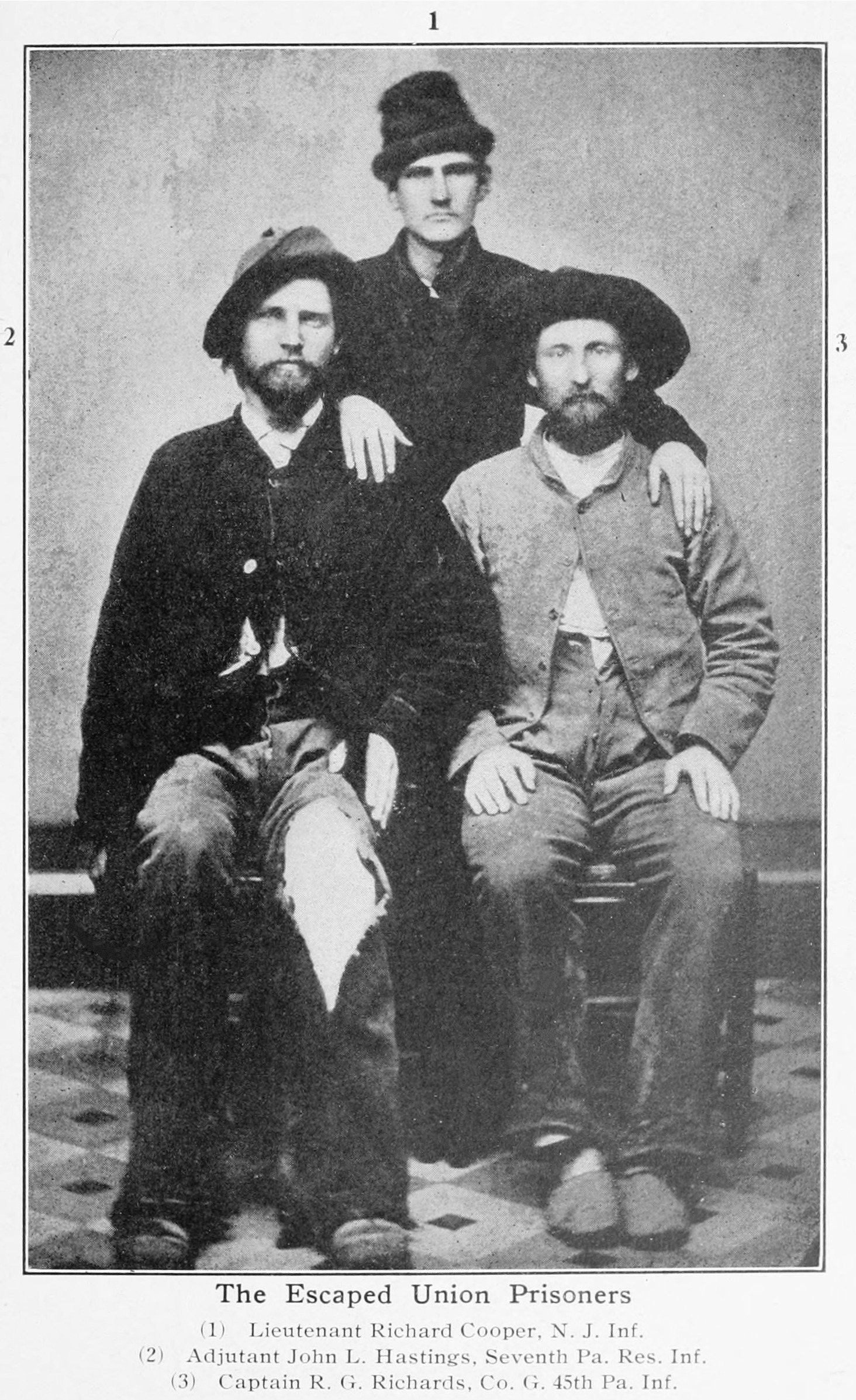
March 17, 1865. Shown on right with two others who escaped from Confederate POW camp.

== Political ==
After the war, he moved to Youngstown, Ohio, and engaged in mercantile business for two years, then six years in Irondale, Ohio. In 1873, and again in 1875, he was elected to represent Jefferson County, Ohio, in the Ohio House of Representatives at the 61st and 62nd General Assemblies In 1876 he was admitted to the bar. He represented the 22nd district in the Ohio Senate in the 63rd and 64th General Assemblies (1878–1881). In 1881, he defeated Democrat Edgar M. Johnson for election as Lieutenant Governor of Ohio, and could have had the nomination in 1883, had he wanted it.

He was elected to two terms as Common Pleas Judge of Jefferson County while living in Steubenville, Ohio, starting in 1902, and died February 10, 1917.

== Personal ==
Richards married Catherine C. Rees of Tioga County, Pennsylvania, on November 22, 1865, and Elizabeth Johnson of Jefferson County, Ohio, on September 25, 1894, who had one daughter. Richards was a Freemason and a Presbyterian by faith. He was a member of the Grand Army of the Republic and the Military Order of the Loyal Legion of the United States.

== Notes ==
Political offices
Preceded by Andrew Hickenlooper	Lieutenant Governor of Ohio; 1882-1884	Succeeded by John G. Warwick
Ohio Senate
Preceded by J. K. Rukenbrod	Senator from 22nd District; 1878-1881	Succeeded by J. M. Dickinson
Ohio House of Representatives
Preceded by Samuel H. Ford	Representative from Jefferson County; 1874-1877	Succeeded by Thomas B. Scott
Legal offices
Preceded by John A. Mansfield	Jefferson County Common Pleas Judge; 1902-1913	Succeeded by Carl H. Smith
