= Milton I. Southard =

American politician (1836–1905)

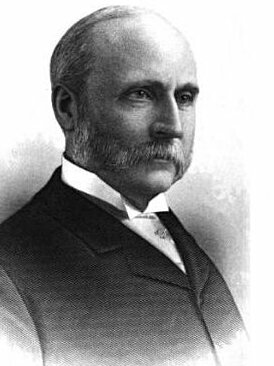

Member of the U.S. House of Representatives from Ohio's 13th district
- In office March 4, 1873 – March 3, 1879
- Preceded by: George W. Morgan
- Succeeded by: Adoniram J. Warner

Personal details
- Born: Milton Isaiah Southard; October 20, 1836 Hanover, Ohio, U.S.
- Died: May 4, 1905 (aged 68) Zanesville, Ohio, U.S.
- Party: Democratic
- Education: Denison University

Milton Isaiah Southard (October 20, 1836 – May 4, 1905) was a U.S. representative from Ohio.

Born in Hanover, Ohio, Southard completed preparatory studies. He graduated from the Denison University, Granville, Ohio where he studied law. He was admitted to the bar in 1863 and commenced practice in Toledo, Ohio. He served as prosecuting attorney for Muskingum County, Ohio, from 1867 to 1871.

Southard was elected as a Democrat to the Forty-third, Forty-fourth, and Forty-fifth Congresses (March 4, 1873 – March 3, 1879). He served as chairman of the Committee on Territories (Forty-fourth Congress). He moved to New York City and practiced law.

Southard died in Zanesville, Ohio, May 4, 1905. He was interred in Woodlawn Cemetery, Zanesville.

== Sources ==
- United States Congress. "Milton I. Southard (id: S000688)". Biographical Directory of the United States Congress.

U.S. House of Representatives
Preceded by George W. Morgan	Member of the U.S. House of Representatives from Ohio's 13th congressional district 1873–1879	Succeeded by Adoniram J. Warner
