= James W. Owens (Ohio politician) =

American politician

Member of the U.S. House of Representatives from Ohio
- In office March 4, 1889 – March 3, 1893
- Preceded by: Beriah Wilkins
- Succeeded by: Michael D. Harter
- Constituency: 16th district (1889–1891); 14th district (1891–1893)

Member of the Ohio Senate from the 16th district
- In office January 3, 1876 – January 4, 1880
- Preceded by: William P. Reid
- Succeeded by: F. M. Marriott

Personal details
- Born: October 24, 1837 Franklin County, Indiana, U.S.
- Died: March 30, 1900 (aged 62) Newark, Ohio, U.S.
- Resting place: Cedar Hill Cemetery
- Party: Democratic
- Spouse: Martha Kumler
- Education: University of Michigan Law School

James W. Owens (October 24, 1837 – March 30, 1900) was an American lawyer and politician who served two non-consecutive terms as a U.S. representative from Ohio.

== Early life and career ==
Born in Franklin County, Indiana, Owens pursued academic studies. He was graduated from Miami University, Oxford, Ohio, in 1862. During the Civil War enlisted in the Union Army as a private in the 20th Ohio Infantry, for three months' service. Reenlisted and was made first lieutenant of Company A, 86th Ohio Infantry, and on the reorganization of that regiment was made captain of Company K.

He attended the law department of the University of Michigan at Ann Arbor in 1864 and 1865. He was admitted to the bar in 1865 and commenced practice in Newark, Ohio.

He married Martha Kumler of Oxford, Ohio in 1867.

Owens was elected prosecuting attorney of Licking County in 1867 and reelected in 1869. He owned the Evans–Holton–Owens House in Newark from 1868 to 1870. Owens was elected to the State Senate in 1875. He was reelected in 1877 and served as president of that body. He served as member of the board of trustees of Miami University 1878–1896.

== Congress ==
Owens was elected as a Democrat to the Fifty-first and Fifty-second Congresses (March 4, 1889 – March 3, 1893). He served as chairman of the Committee on Expenditures in the Department of the Interior (Fifty-second Congress). He was not a candidate for renomination in 1892.

== Later career and death ==
He resumed the practice of his profession. He died in Newark, Ohio, on March 30, 1900. He was interred in Cedar Hill Cemetery.

== Sources ==
- United States Congress. "James W. Owens (id: O000158)". Biographical Directory of the United States Congress.

U.S. House of Representatives
Preceded by Beriah Wilkins	Member of the U.S. House of Representatives from Ohio's 16th congressional district 1889-1891	Succeeded by John G. Warwick
Preceded by Charles P. Wickham	Member of the U.S. House of Representatives from Ohio's 14th congressional district 1891-1893	Succeeded by Michael D. Harter
