= Lewis P. Ohliger =

American politician

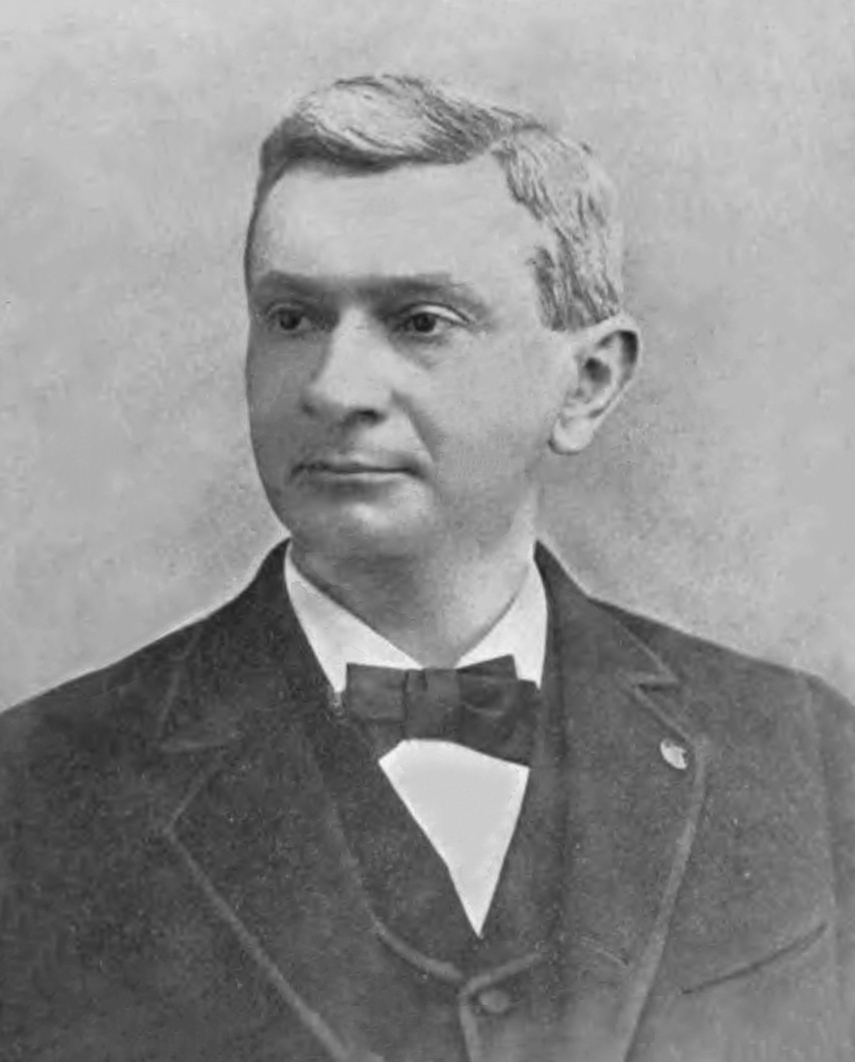

Member of the U.S. House of Representatives from Ohio's 16th district
- In office December 5, 1892 – March 3, 1893
- Preceded by: John G. Warwick
- Succeeded by: Albert J. Pearson

Personal details
- Born: Lewis Philip Ohliger; January 3, 1843 Rheinpfalz, Bavaria, Germany
- Died: January 9, 1923 (aged 80) San Diego, California, US
- Resting place: Wooster Cemetery, Wooster, Ohio
- Party: Democratic

Lewis Philip Ohliger (January 3, 1843 – January 9, 1923) was an American politician who briefly served as a U.S. representative from Ohio from 1892 to 1893.

== Biography ==
Born in Rheinpfalz, Kingdom of Bavaria, Ohliger immigrated to the United States in October 1854 with his parents. He settled in Canton, Ohio, in 1857 and attended the public schools.

=== Early career ===
He later moved to Wooster, Ohio, and engaged in the wholesale drug and grocery business. He served as county treasurer from 1875 to 1879, and as postmaster of Wooster from February 1885 until February 1890. He was also a trustee of the Wooster & Lodi Railway. He served as delegate to the Democratic National Convention in 1892.

=== Congress ===
Ohliger was elected as a Democrat to the Fifty-second Congress to fill the vacancy caused by the death of John G. Warwick and served from December 5, 1892, to March 3, 1893. He was an unsuccessful for renomination in 1892.

=== Later career ===
He served as internal-revenue collector of the Cleveland district by appointment of President Grover Cleveland from 1893 to 1898. He also resumed his former business pursuits.

=== Death ===
He died in San Diego, California, January 9, 1923, and was interred in Wooster Cemetery, Wooster, Ohio.

== Sources ==
- United States Congress. "Lewis P. Ohliger (id: O000057)". Biographical Directory of the United States Congress.

U.S. House of Representatives
Preceded by John G. Warwick	Member of the U.S. House of Representatives from Ohio's 16th congressional district 1892-1893	Succeeded by Albert J. Pearson
