= Beriah Wilkins =

American politician

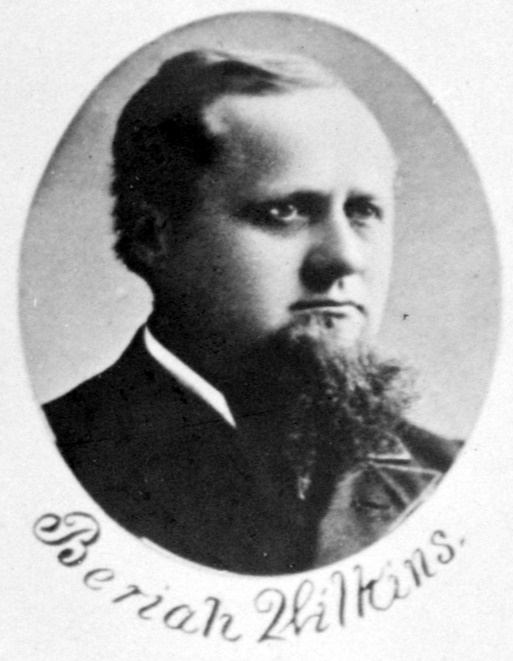

Member of the U.S. House of Representatives from Ohio
- In office March 4, 1883 – March 3, 1889
- Preceded by: Joseph D. Taylor
- Succeeded by: James W. Owens
- Constituency: 15th district (1883-1885); 16th district (1885-1887); 15th district (1887-1889)

Member of the Ohio Senate from the 18th district
- In office January 5, 1880 – January 1, 1882
- Preceded by: John C. Fisher
- Succeeded by: Albert J. Pearson

Personal details
- Born: July 10, 1846 Union County, Ohio, U.S.
- Died: June 7, 1905 (aged 58) Washington, D.C., U.S.
- Resting place: Rock Creek Cemetery; Washington, D.C., U.S.
- Party: Democratic
- Occupation: Newspaper publisher

Military service
- Allegiance: United States
- Branch/service: Union Army
- Years of service: 1864
- Rank: private
- Unit: 136th Ohio Infantry

Beriah Wilkins (July 10, 1846 – June 7, 1905) was an American politician and Civil War veteran who served three terms as a U.S. representative from Ohio from 1883 to 1889.

== Biography ==
Born near Richwood, Ohio, Wilkins attended the common schools of Marysville, Ohio. During the American Civil War, he enlisted as a private in Company H, One Hundred and Thirty-sixth Regiment, Ohio Volunteer Infantry, May 2, 1864, and served until honorably discharged August 31, 1864. He then engaged in banking in Uhrichsville, Ohio. He was a member of the Ohio Senate in 1880 and 1881 and served as member of the Democratic State central committee in 1882.

=== Congress ===
Wilkins was elected as a Democrat to the Forty-eighth, Forty-ninth, and Fiftieth Congresses (March 4, 1883 – March 3, 1889). He served as chairman of the Committee on Banking and Currency (Fiftieth Congress).

=== Later career and death ===
After his congressional service, Wilkins settled in Washington, D.C. He became majority owner and publisher of The Washington Post in 1889, and later, in 1894, acquired the entire stock ownership of the paper, serving as editor until his death in Washington, D.C., June 7, 1905. He is interred in Rock Creek Cemetery.

U.S. House of Representatives
Preceded by Joseph D. Taylor	United States Representative from Ohio's 16th congressional district 1883–1885	Succeeded by George W. Geddes
Preceded by Adoniram J. Warner	United States Representative from Ohio's 15th congressional district 1885–1887	Succeeded by Charles H. Grosvenor
Preceded by George W. Geddes	United States Representative from Ohio's 16th congressional district 1887–1889	Succeeded by James W. Owens
