= Adoniram J. Warner =

American politician (1834–1910)

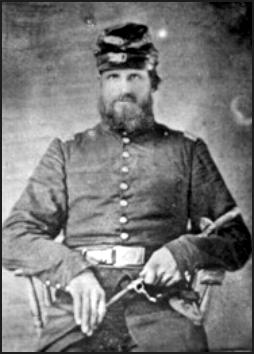

Member of the U.S. House of Representatives from Ohio
- In office March 4, 1879 – March 3, 1881
- Preceded by: Milton I. Southard
- Succeeded by: Gibson Atherton
- Constituency: 13th district
- In office March 4, 1883 – March 3, 1887
- Preceded by: Rufus Dawes
- Succeeded by: Joseph D. Taylor
- Constituency: 15th district (1883–1885); 17th district (1885–1887)

Personal details
- Born: Adoniram Judson Warner; January 13, 1834 Buffalo, New York, U.S.
- Died: August 12, 1910 (aged 76) Marietta, Ohio, U.S.
- Resting place: Oak Grove Cemetery, Marietta, Ohio
- Party: Democratic
- Education: Beloit College; New York Central College, McGrawville

Military service
- Allegiance: United States of America; Union
- Branch/service: United States Army; Union Army
- Years of service: 1861-1865
- Rank: Colonel; Bvt. Brigadier General
- Commands: 10th Pennsylvania Reserve Regiment
- Battles/wars: American Civil War

Adoniram Judson Warner (January 13, 1834 – August 12, 1910) was an American politician who served as a U.S. representative from Ohio and an officer in the Union Army during the American Civil War. He served three terms in the U.S. House of Representatives between 1879 and 1887.

== Biography ==
Born in Wales, New York (near Buffalo, New York), Warner moved with his parents to Wisconsin at the age of eleven. He attended Beloit College in Wisconsin and New-York Central College. He was principal of Lewistown (Pennsylvania) Academy, superintendent of the public schools of Mifflin County, Pennsylvania, and principal of Mercer Union School, Pennsylvania from 1856 to 1861.

=== Civil War ===
He was commissioned as captain in the Tenth Pennsylvania Reserves on July 21, 1861, promoted to lieutenant colonel on May 14, 1862 and became colonel on April 25, 1863. He was transferred into the Veteran Reserve Corps in November 1863. On January 13, 1866, President Andrew Johnson nominated Warner for appointment to the grade of brevet brigadier general of volunteers, to rank from March 13, 1865, and the United States Senate confirmed the appointment on March 12, 1866.

=== Law and business career ===
Warner studied law and was admitted to the bar in Indianapolis, Indiana in 1865 but never practiced. At the conclusion of the war, he returned to Pennsylvania, and in 1866 moved to Marietta, Ohio. He engaged in the oil, coal, and railroad businesses.

=== Congress ===
Warner was elected as a Democrat to the Forty-sixth Congress (March 4, 1879 – March 3, 1881). He was an unsuccessful candidate for reelection in 1880 to the Forty-seventh Congress.

Warner was elected to the Forty-eighth and Forty-ninth Congresses (March 4, 1883 – March 3, 1887). He was not a candidate for reelection in 1886.

He served as delegate to the 1896 Democratic National Convention.

=== Later career ===
He engaged in street railway construction in the District of Columbia and in railroad construction in Ohio. From about 1898 until six months before his death, he engaged in transportation and power development in Georgia.

=== Death and burial ===
He died in Marietta, Ohio August 12, 1910. He was interred in Oak Grove Cemetery.

== See also ==
- List of American Civil War brevet generals (Union)

== Notes ==
U.S. House of Representatives
Preceded by Milton I. Southard	Member of the U.S. House of Representatives from Ohio's 13th congressional district 1879–1881	Succeeded by Gibson Atherton
Preceded by Rufus Dawes	Member of the U.S. House of Representatives from Ohio's 15th congressional district 1883–1885	Succeeded by Beriah Wilkins
Preceded by Joseph D. Taylor	Member of the U.S. House of Representatives from Ohio's 17th congressional district 1885–1887	Succeeded by Joseph D. Taylor
