= 136th Ohio Infantry Regiment =

- Active: May 18, 1864, to August 30, 1864
- Country: United States
- Allegiance: Union
- Branch: Infantry

The 136th Ohio Infantry Regiment, sometimes 136th Ohio Volunteer Infantry (or 136th OVI) was an infantry regiment in the Union Army during the American Civil War.

== Service ==
The 136th Ohio Infantry was organized at Camp Chase in Columbus, Ohio, and mustered on May 18, 1864, for 100 days service under the command of Colonel W. Smith Irwin.

The regiment was attached to 2nd Brigade, DeRussy's Division, XXII Corps, to July 1864. 3rd Brigade, DeRussy's Division, XXII Corps, to August 1864.

The 136th Ohio Infantry mustered out of service August 30, 1864.

== Detailed service ==
Left Ohio for Washington, D.C., May 13. Assigned to garrison duty at Forts Ellsworth, Williams and in the northern defenses of Washington, D.C. until August. Participated in the repulse of Early's attack on Washington July 11–12.

== Ohio National Guard ==
Over 35,000 Ohio National Guardsmen were federalized and organized into regiments for 100 days service in May 1864. Shipped to the Eastern Theater, they were designed to be placed in "safe" rear areas to protect railroads and supply points, thereby freeing regular troops for Lt. Gen. Ulysses S. Grant’s push on the Confederate capital of Richmond, Virginia. As events transpired, many units found themselves in combat, stationed in the path of Confederate Gen. Jubal Early’s veteran Army of the Valley during its famed Valley Campaigns of 1864. Ohio Guard units met the battle-tested foe head on and helped blunt the Confederate offensive thereby saving Washington, D.C. from capture. Ohio National Guard units participated in the battles of Monacacy, Fort Stevens, Harpers Ferry, and in the siege of Petersburg.

== Casualties ==
The regiment lost 25 men during service; 2 officers and 23 enlisted men due to disease.

== Commanders ==
- Colonel W. Smith Irwin

== See also ==
- List of Ohio Civil War units
- Ohio in the Civil War
