= 186th =

186th may refer to:

- 186th (2/2nd West Riding) Brigade, formation of the Territorial Force of the British Army
- 186th (Kent) Battalion, CEF, unit in the Canadian Expeditionary Force during the First World War
- 186th Aero Squadron, an Air Service, United States Army unit that fought on the Western Front during World War I
- 186th Air Refueling Wing, unit of the Mississippi Air National Guard stationed at Key Field Air National Guard Base, Mississippi
- 186th Airlift Squadron, unit of the Montana Air National Guard 120th Airlift Wing located at Great Falls Air National Guard Base, Montana
- 186th Infantry Regiment (United States), combat regiment of the United States Army made up of soldiers from the Oregon Army National Guard
- 186th New York State Legislature consists of the New York State Senate and the New York State Assembly
- 186th Ohio Infantry (or 186th OVI), an infantry regiment in the Union Army during the American Civil War
- 186th Street (Manhattan), New York
- Pennsylvania's 186th Representative District, located in Philadelphia County, United States of America

== See also ==
- 186 (number)
- AD 186, the year 186 (CLXXXVI) of the Julian calendar
- 186 BC
