= Eliakim H. Moore =

American politician

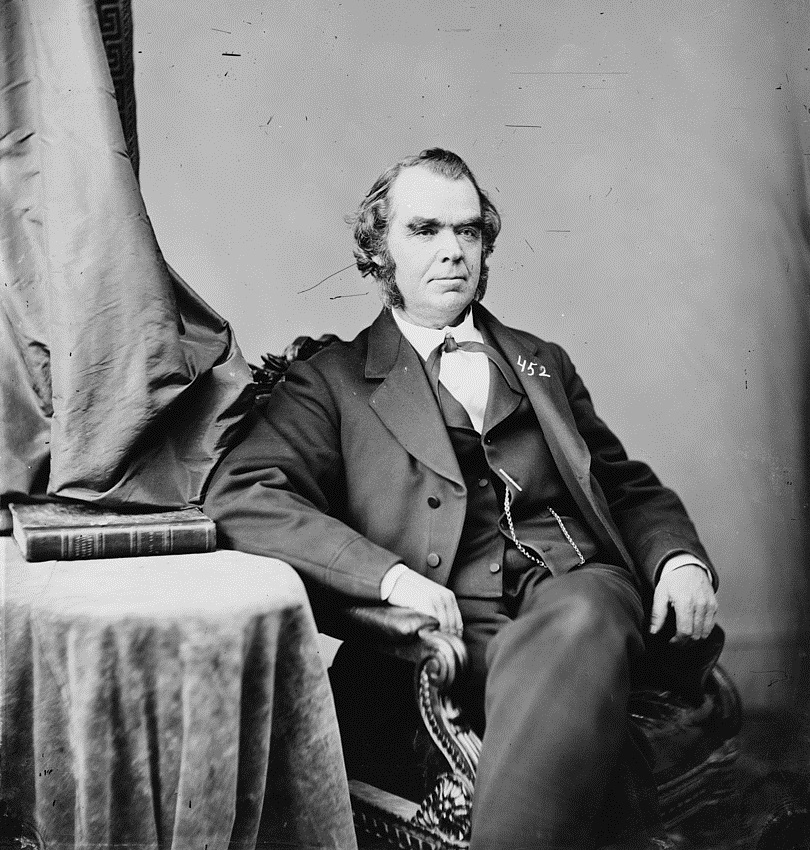

Member of the U.S. House of Representatives from Ohio's 15th district
- In office March 4, 1869 – March 3, 1871
- Preceded by: Tobias A. Plants
- Succeeded by: William P. Sprague

Personal details
- Born: Eliakim Hastings Moore; June 19, 1812 Boylston, Massachusetts, U.S.
- Died: April 4, 1900 (aged 87) Athens, Ohio, U.S.
- Resting place: West Union Street Cemetery
- Party: Republican

Eliakim Hastings Moore (June 19, 1812 – April 4, 1900) was an American politician who served one term as a U.S. representative from Ohio from 1869 to 1871.

== Biography ==
Moore was born to David & Dolly (Hastings) Moore in Boylston, Massachusetts, and moved with his parents to Marietta, Ohio and in 1817 to Athens County, Ohio. He attended the common schools, and later educated himself at night as a civil engineer.

=== Early career ===
Moore served as County surveyor from 1836-1846, and later as Auditor for Athens County from 1846 to 1860. He served as collector of internal revenue for the Marietta-Athens district of Ohio from 1862 to 1866, later organizing the First National Bank of Athens in 1863 and was connected therewith as president and director until about 1895.

=== Congress ===
Moore was elected as a Republican to the Forty-first Congress (March 4, 1869 – March 3, 1871), but was not a candidate for renomination in 1870. After politics, he engaged in railroad enterprises in Athens, Ohio, as well as being a Trustee of Ohio University at Athens.

Moore died in Athens April 4, 1900, and was interred in West Union Street Cemetery.

=== Descendants ===
The mathematician E. H. Moore was his grandson.

== Sources ==
- United States Congress. "Eliakim H. Moore (id: M000896)". Biographical Directory of the United States Congress.

U.S. House of Representatives
Preceded by Tobias A. Plants	United States Representative from Ohio's 15th congressional district 1869–1871	Succeeded by William P. Sprague
