= Charles Preston Wickham =

American politician

Charles P. Wickham
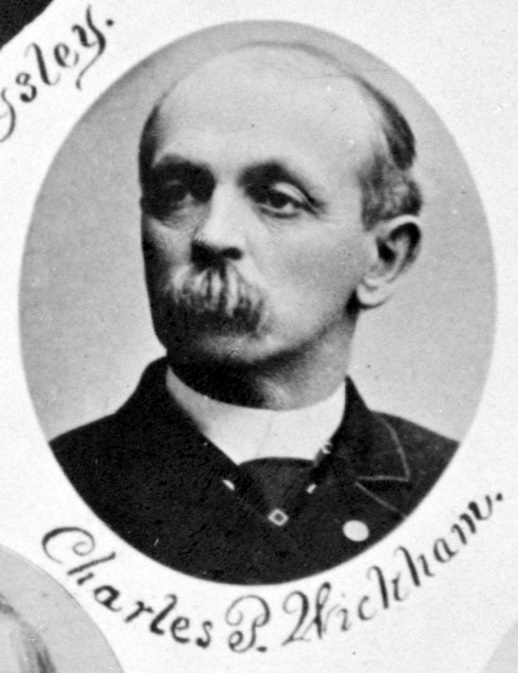

Member of the U.S. House of Representatives from Ohio's 14th district
- In office March 4, 1887 – March 3, 1891
- Preceded by: Charles H. Grosvenor
- Succeeded by: James W. Owens

Personal details
- Born: Charles Preston Wickham; September 15, 1836 Norwalk, Ohio, US
- Died: March 18, 1925 (aged 88) Norwalk, Ohio, US
- Resting place: Woodlawn Cemetery
- Party: Republican
- Education: Cincinnati Law School

Military service
- Allegiance: United States
- Branch/service: (United States) Union Army
- Years of service: 1861-1865
- Rank: Brevet Lieutenant colonel
- Unit: 55th Ohio Infantry
- Battles/wars: American Civil War

Charles Preston Wickham (September 15, 1836 – March 18, 1925) was a 19th-century congressman and judge from Norwalk, Huron County, Ohio.

== Early life ==
Wickham was born September 15, 1836, in Norwalk, Ohio. He attended the public schools, followed by the Norwalk Academy. He then attended the Cincinnati Law School.

During the American Civil War, he enlisted as a private in Company D, Fifty-fifth Regiment, Ohio Volunteers, in September 1861 and rose to the rank of lieutenant colonel. He was mustered out of the service July 11, 1865. After the war, he was elected as a companion of the Ohio Commandery of the Military Order of the Loyal Legion of the United States.

== Career ==
Wickham was admitted to the bar in 1858 and practiced in Norwalk. After the Civil War, he resumed the practice of law in Norwalk. He served as prosecuting attorney from 1866 to 1870 and was elected judge of the Court of Common Pleas of the fourth judicial district in 1880 and 1885.

Wickham was then elected as a Republican to the Fiftieth and Fifty-first Congresses (March 4, 1887 – March 3, 1891) and served as chairman of the Committee on Coinage, Weights, and Measures (Fifty-first Congress).

== Personal life ==
He died in Norwalk, Ohio on March 18, 1925, after being struck by a motorist and was interred in Woodlawn Cemetery.

U.S. House of Representatives
| Preceded by Charles H. Grosvenor | Member of the U.S. House of Representatives from Ohio's 14th congressional district 1887-1891 | Succeeded by James W. Owens |
