= Colonel Joseph Taylor House =

Historic house in Ohio, United States

- U.S. National Register of Historic Places
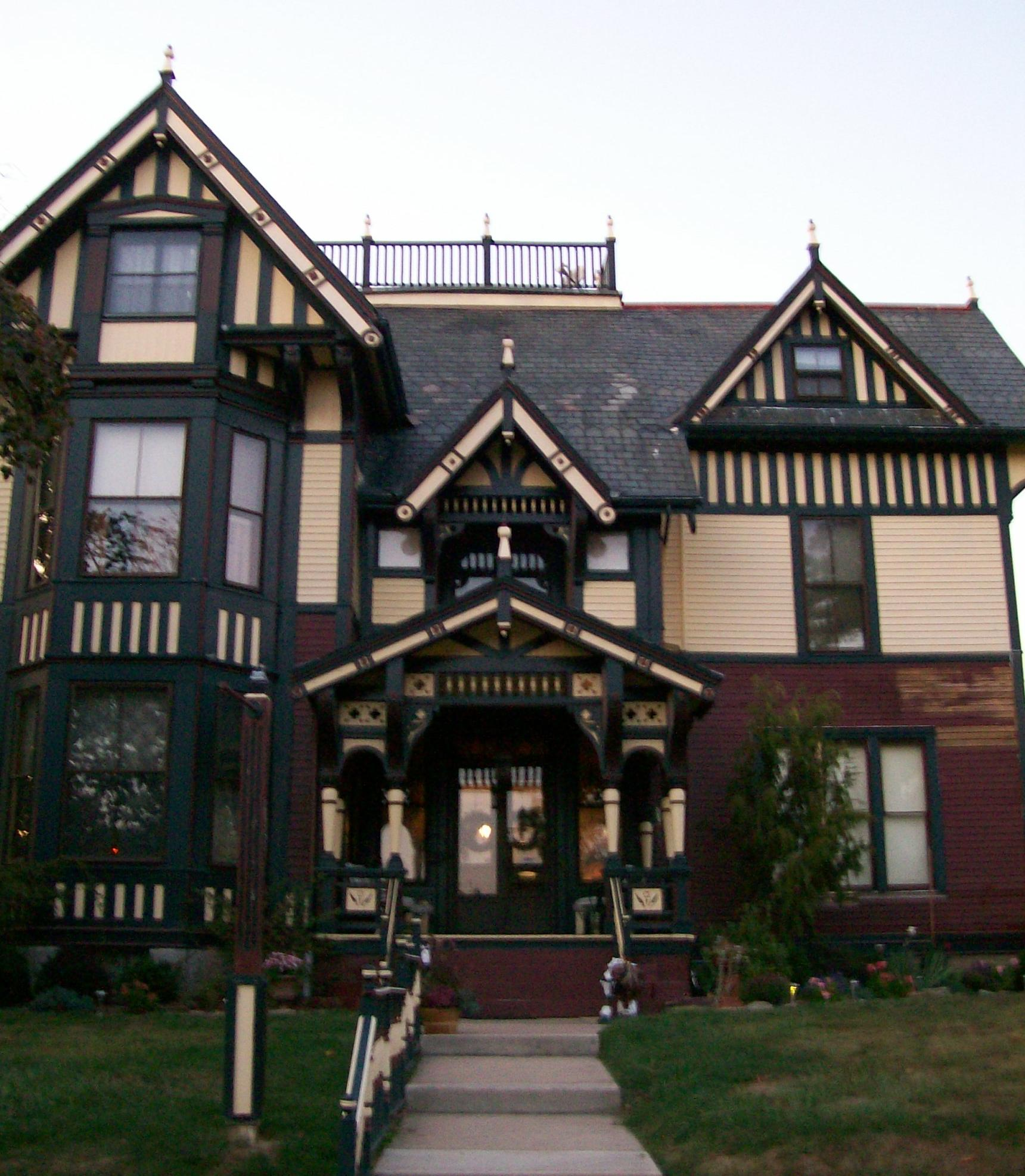
- Front of the house

- Location within Ohio Location within the United States
- Location: 633 Upland Rd., Cambridge, Ohio
- Coordinates: 40°2′1″N 81°35′32″W
- Area: Less than 1 acre (0.40 ha)
- Built: 1878
- Architect: Joseph Danner Hannaford
- Architectural style: Queen Anne, Stick-Eastlake
- NRHP reference No.: 08000801
- Added to NRHP: August 29, 2008

The Colonel Joseph Taylor House is a historic house in the city of Cambridge, Ohio, United States. It was the home of one of Cambridge's leading residents in the late nineteenth century, and it has been named a historic site.

Designed by Samuel Hannaford, it was the home of Joseph Danner Taylor, a local newspaperman and politician, U.S. Army judge soon after the Civil War, and U.S. Representative. Possessed of a strong mind from young boyhood, Taylor was fondly remembered by his neighbors as a paragon of community virtue, as well as for his unwavering editorial support of the war when so many men quavered or actively sought to subvert the national struggle.

Taylor's house mixes two related architectural styles, the Queen Anne and the Stick-Eastlake. Built of wood on a stone foundation, the house is topped with a two-part roof: some is slate-covered, while the rest is protected by asphalt. The two-and-a-half-story facade is composed of three distinctive sections: the middle, comprising an elaborate porch with projecting eaves and a smaller sheltered pair of windows on the second story; a plain right side (as seen from the street) with flat walls, a third-floor gable, and a simple window in each story; and a three-story left side dominated by a large bay window on the first and second stories and a prominent overhang on the third. The entire building is covered with a multi-part gabled roof.

In 2008, the Taylor House was listed on the National Register of Historic Places, qualifying both because of its architecture and because of connection to Joseph Taylor. By that time, it had been converted into a bed and breakfast, the Colonel Taylor Inn.
