= Charles H. Grosvenor =

American politician (1833–1917)

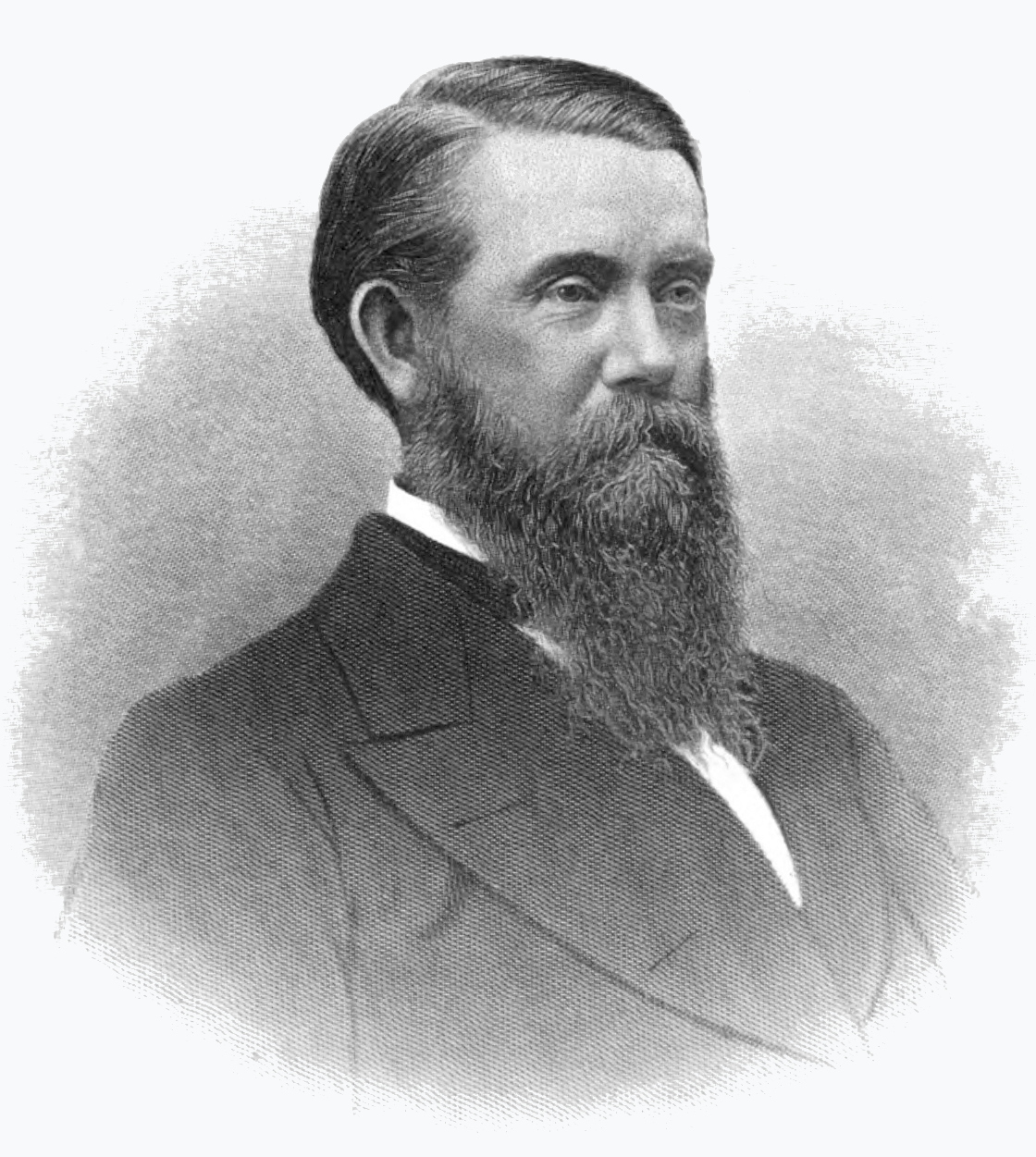
- Grosvenor in 1897

Chairman of the House Republican Conference
- In office March 4, 1895 – March 3, 1899
- Speaker: Thomas Brackett Reed
- Preceded by: Thomas J. Henderson
- Succeeded by: Joseph G. Cannon

Member of the U.S. House of Representatives from Ohio
- In office March 4, 1885 – March 3, 1891
- Preceded by: George W. Geddes
- Succeeded by: Michael D. Harter
- Constituency: 14th district (1885–87); 15th district (1887–91)
- In office March 4, 1893 – March 3, 1907
- Preceded by: John M. Pattison
- Succeeded by: Albert Douglas
- Constituency: 11th district

Member of the Ohio House of Representatives from the Athens district
- In office January 5, 1874 – January 6, 1878
- Preceded by: Nelson H. Van Vorhes
- Succeeded by: Charles Townsend

Personal details
- Born: Charles Henry Grosvenor; September 20, 1833 Pomfret, Connecticut, U.S.
- Died: October 30, 1917 (aged 84) Athens, Ohio, U.S.
- Resting place: West Union Street Cemetery, Athens, Ohio
- Party: Republican
- Spouse(s): Samantha Stewart; Louise A. Currier
- Children: three
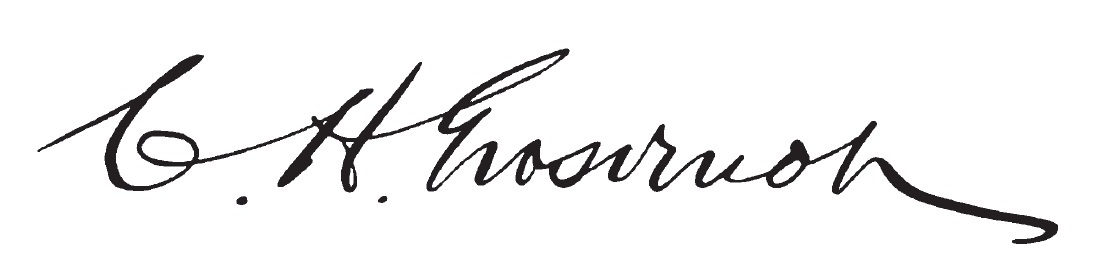
- Signature
- Nickname: "Old Figgers"

Military service
- Allegiance: United States of America; Union
- Branch/service: United States Army; Union Army
- Rank: Colonel brevet brigadier general
- Unit: 18th Ohio Infantry
- Battles/wars: American Civil War

Charles Henry Grosvenor (September 20, 1833 – October 30, 1917) was an American lawyer and educator who served as a multiple-term U.S. representative from Ohio, as well as a brigade commander in the Union Army during the American Civil War.

== Biography ==
Grosvenor was born in Pomfret, Connecticut. He was the uncle of Congressman Charles Grosvenor Bond. In 1838, Grosvenor moved with his parents to southeastern Ohio, where he attended school in Athens County. He later taught school before studying law. He was admitted to the bar in 1857 and practiced in Athens.

=== Civil War ===
During the Civil War, Grosvenor served in the 18th Ohio Infantry and was promoted through the ranks to colonel. He led his regiment at the Battle of Chickamauga in 1863, and was a brigade commander in the division of Charles Cruft at the Battle of Nashville in December 1864. At the close of the war, Grosvenor was brevetted as a colonel in the Regular Army. He was mustered out of the volunteers on October 9, 1865. On January 13, 1866, President Andrew Johnson nominated Grosvenor for appointment to the grade of brevet brigadier general of volunteers, to rank from March 13, 1865, and the United States Senate confirmed the appointment on March 12, 1866. After the war, he was elected as a companion of the Ohio Commandery of the Military Order of the Loyal Legion of the United States. He was also a member of the Sons of the American Revolution.

=== Early political career ===
Following the war, Grosvenor held diverse township and village offices. He served as a member of the State house of representatives from 1874–1878 and served as Speaker of the House for two years. He served as member of the board of trustees of the Ohio Soldiers' and Sailors' Orphans' Home in Xenia from April 1880 until 1888, and president of the board for five years.

Presidential elector for Grant/Wilson in 1872. Presidential elector for Garfield/Arthur in 1880.

He served as delegate to the Republican National Convention in 1896 and 1900.

=== Congress ===
Grosvenor was elected as a Republican to the Forty-ninth, Fiftieth, and Fifty-first Congresses (March 4, 1885 – March 3, 1891). He was an unsuccessful candidate for renomination in 1890.

Grosvenor was elected to the Fifty-third and to the six succeeding Congresses (March 4, 1893 – March 3, 1907). He served as chairman of the Committee on Expenditures in the Department of the Treasury (Fifty-fourth Congress), Committee on Mines and Mining (Fifty-fifth Congress), Committee on Merchant Marine and Fisheries (Fifty-sixth through Fifty-ninth Congresses). He was an unsuccessful candidate for renomination in 1906.

From January onward, Grosvenor exchanged views with Taft on Ohio politics, predicted a triumphant nomination, and worked with Arthur I. Vorys (a member of the Republican National Committee) to arrange Taft's August 29, 1908, visit to Athens, including a parade, a luncheon at Grosvenor's home, and a speech at a soldiers' reunion. Special trains brought thousands of spectators.

=== Later career and death ===
He resumed the practice of law in Athens. The combat veteran was appointed as chairman of the Chickamauga and Chattanooga National Park Commission and served from 1910 until his death in Athens on October 30, 1917. He was interred in Union Street Cemetery.

=== Family ===
Grosvenor married Samantha Stewart of Athens County, December 1, 1858. She died in 1866, leaving a daughter. He married Louise A. Currier, also of Athens County, May 21, 1867. She had two daughters.

== See also ==
- List of American Civil War brevet generals (Union)

== Notes ==
U.S. House of Representatives
Preceded by George W. Geddes	Member of the U.S. House of Representatives from Ohio's 14th congressional district March 4, 1885 – March 3, 1887	Succeeded by Charles P. Wickham
Preceded by Beriah Wilkins	Member of the U.S. House of Representatives from Ohio's 15th congressional district March 4, 1887 – March 3, 1891	Succeeded by Michael D. Harter
Preceded by John M. Pattison	Member of the U.S. House of Representatives from Ohio's 11th congressional district March 4, 1893 – March 3, 1907	Succeeded by Albert Douglas
