= Joseph D. Taylor =

American politician

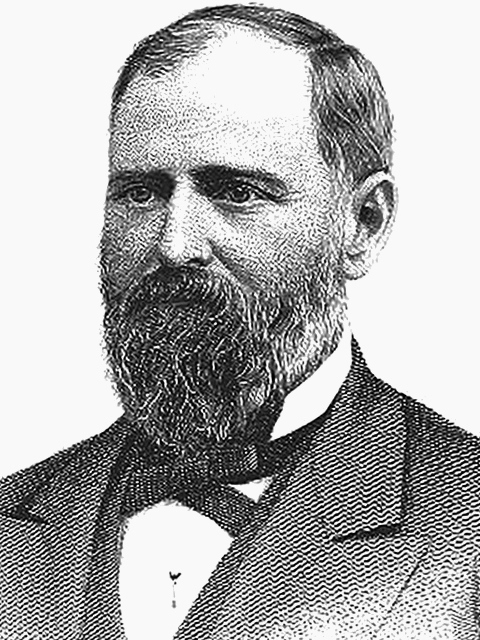

Member of the U.S. House of Representatives from Ohio
- In office March 4, 1887 – March 3, 1893
- Preceded by: Adoniram J. Warner
- Succeeded by: George P. Ikirt
- Constituency: 17th district (1887–1891); 18th district (1891–1893)
- In office January 2, 1883 – March 3, 1885
- Preceded by: Jonathan T. Updegraff
- Succeeded by: Adoniram J. Warner
- Constituency: 16th district (1883); 17th district (1883–1885)

Personal details
- Born: Joseph Danner Taylor; November 7, 1830 Belmont County, Ohio, U.S.
- Died: September 19, 1899 (aged 68) Cambridge, Ohio, U.S.
- Resting place: South Cemetery, Cambridge, Ohio
- Party: Republican
- Education: Madison College; Cincinnati Law School
- Occupation: Attorney
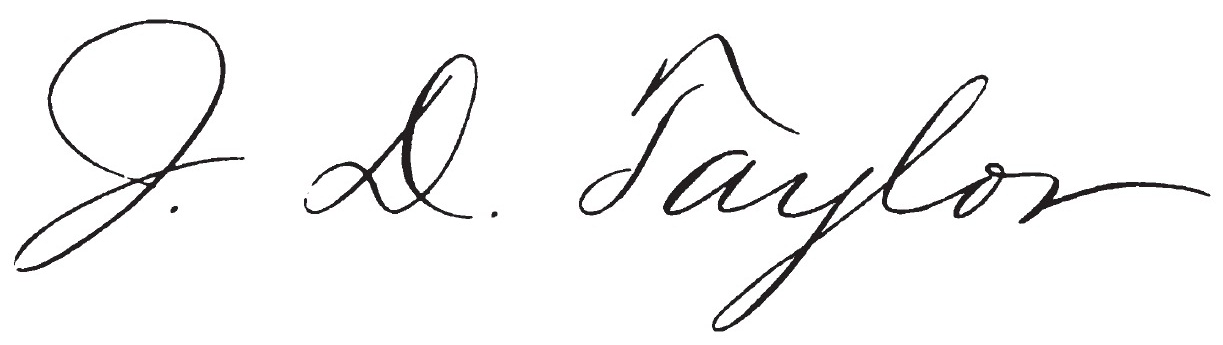
- Signature

Joseph Danner Taylor (November 7, 1830 – September 19, 1899) was an American politician, lawyer and newspaper publisher. He served as a U.S. representative from Ohio, serving four full terms and part of a fifth.

He also served in the Union Army during the Civil War.

== Early life ==
Joseph D. Taylor was born in Goshen Township, in Belmont County, Ohio on March 4, 1887. Taylor attended public schools in Belmont County and later attended Madison College at Antrim, obtaining a teaching degree.

Taylor taught in Fairview High School from 1854 to 1856, and became principal in 1857. He sought a new revenue for his talents and was accepted at Cincinnati Law School, obtaining an LL.B. in 1860. He was admitted to the bar in 1859.

== Career ==
Taylor opened his law practice in 1860. He started the Guernsey Times newspaper in 1861; he was its owner until 1871. Taylor rose in prominence as he made a name for himself in the courts as well as his newspaper articles. Leading up to the Civil War, Taylor ran articles denouncing slavery and called for negotiation to eliminate the practice.

=== Civil War ===
Joining the Union Army during the Civil War he entered as a captain in the 88th Ohio Infantry. He was later brevetted as a lieutenant colonel. Taylor became a judge advocate from 1863 until 1865, when hostilities between the states ended. Taylor also served as a prosecuting attorney for Guernsey County from 1863 to 1866. After the war, he was elected as a companion of the Ohio Commandery of the Military Order of the Loyal Legion of the United States.

=== Early political activities ===
Taylor soon turned to the public welfare by entering politics. He served as delegate to the National Union Convention in 1866, joined the Cambridge School Board from 1870 to 1877, and even served as a delegate to the Republican National Conventions in 1876 and 1880.

=== Congress ===
Taylor was elected as a Republican to the Forty-seventh Congress to fill the vacancy caused by the death of Jonathan T. Updegraff. During his reelection he was voted into the Forty-eighth Congress and served until 1885, when he lost another reelection bid. This setback did not stop him as he campaigned and won his bid to the Fiftieth, Fifty-first, and Fifty-second Congresses and served from March 4, 1887, until March 3, 1893.

=== Later career ===
Taylor retired from politics but remained an influential force in the development and growth of Guernsey County and Cambridge in particular.

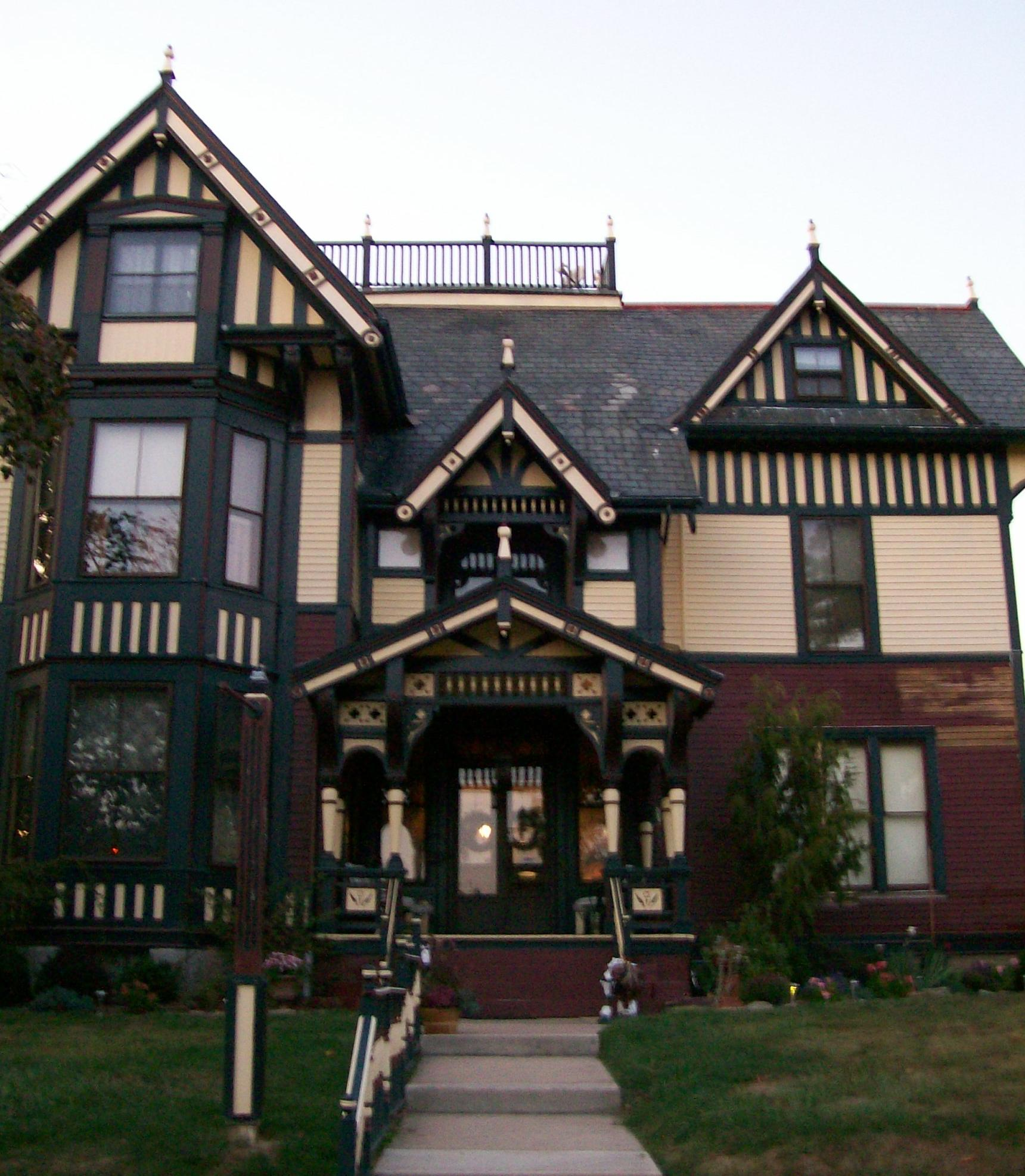
Taylor's house in Cambridge, Ohio.

== Personal life ==
Taylor married Elizabeth A. Hill. Taylor was bought property in Cambridge and lived in a simple wood-frame home on Wheeling Avenue. He would later construct his elegant Queen Anne Style home in 1878 on Upland Drive and constructed the Berwick Hotel on the site of the house on Wheeling Avenue.

=== Death and burial ===
He died in Cambridge on September 19, 1899 at the age of 68. He was interred in the South Cemetery in Cambridge.

U.S. House of Representatives
Preceded by Jonathan T. Updegraff	Member of the U.S. House of Representatives from Ohio's 16th congressional district 1883	Succeeded by Beriah Wilkins
Preceded by William McKinley	Member of the U.S. House of Representatives from Ohio's 17th congressional district 1883–1885	Succeeded by Adoniram J. Warner
Preceded by Adoniram J. Warner	Member of the U.S. House of Representatives from Ohio's 17th congressional district 1887–1891	Succeeded by Albert J. Pearson
Preceded by William McKinley	Member of the U.S. House of Representatives from Ohio's 18th congressional district 1891–1893	Succeeded by George P. Ikirt
