= The Athens Messenger =

Daily newspaper published in Athens, Ohio

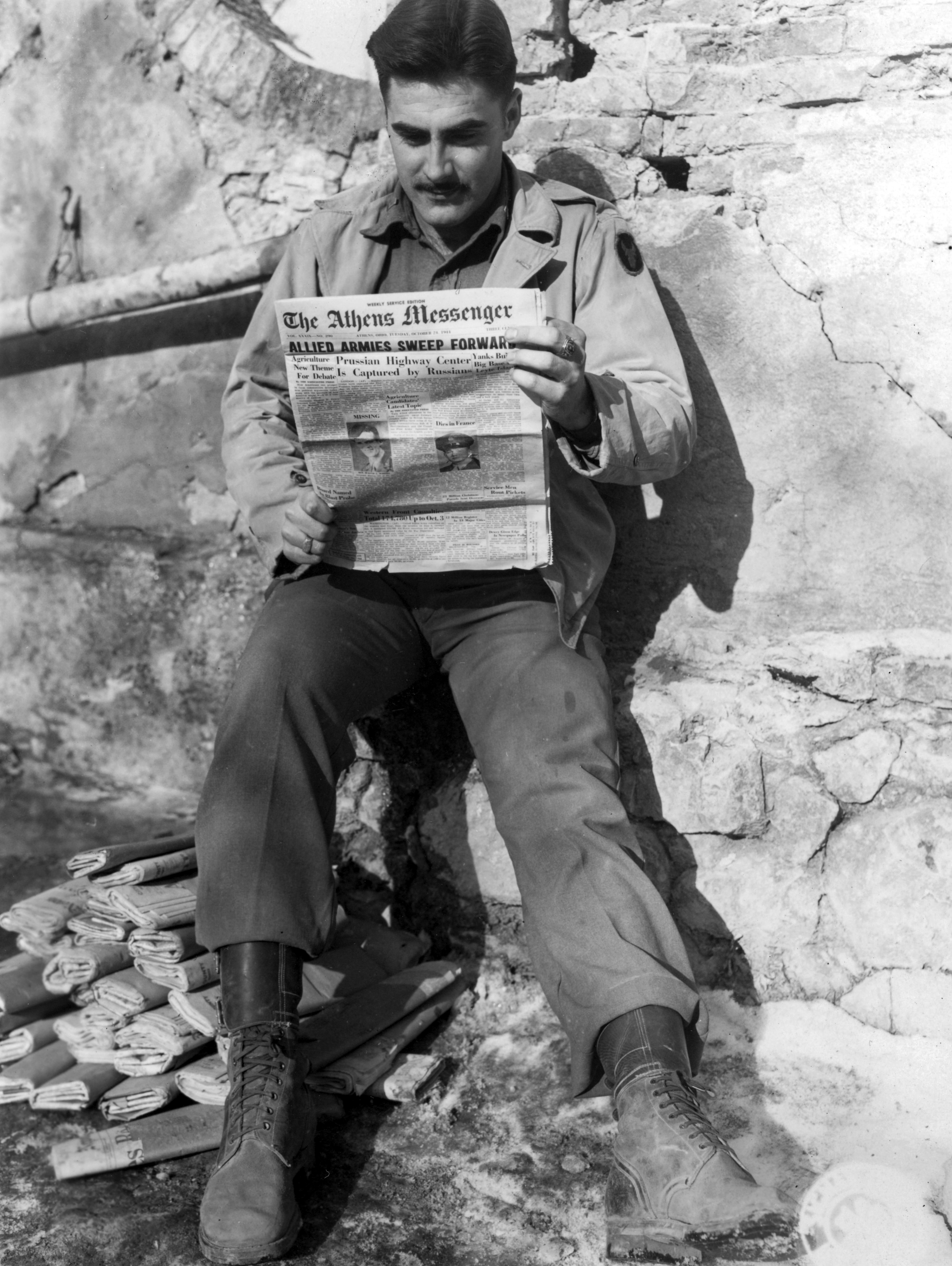
- 2nd Lt. Richard E. Smith, of the 34th Infantry Division reads the Athens Messenger during a lull in the fighting in Italy, 26 January 1945
- Type: Daily newspaper
- Format: Broadsheet
- Owner: Adams MultiMedia
- Publisher: Paul Reynolds
- Editor: Nicole Bowman-Layton
- Founded: 1848
- Headquarters: 9300 Johnson Road Athens, Ohio 45701; United States
- Circulation: 4,000 (as of 2024)
- Website: athensohiotoday.com

The Athens Messenger is a daily newspaper published in Athens, Ohio, United States, serving Athens and the surrounding communities of Athens County.

== History ==
The Athens Messenger was established in 1848, and became a daily publication in 1904.

The newspaper was owned and published by Brown Publishing Company, which publishes more than fifteen daily newspapers and over sixty weekly newspapers. In 2007, it was sold to American Consolidated Media. American Consolidated Media owned more than 100 newspapers in 18 distinct regions of the United States. In 2014, Adams Publishing group acquired 34 papers, including the Messenger, from ACM.
