= 186th Ohio Infantry Regiment =

- Active: February 1865 to September 25, 1865
- Country: United States
- Allegiance: Union
- Branch: Infantry

The 186th Ohio Infantry Regiment, sometimes 186th Ohio Volunteer Infantry (or 186th OVI) was an infantry regiment in the Union Army during the American Civil War.

== Service ==
The 186th Ohio Infantry was organized at Camp Chase in Columbus, Ohio, in February 1865 and mustered in for one year service under the command of Colonel Thomas Francis Wilder.

The regiment was attached to 2nd Brigade, 2nd Separate Division, Department of the Cumberland, to May 1865. 2nd Brigade, 1st Separate Division, District of the Etowah, Department of the Cumberland, to July 1865. 2nd Brigade, 4th Division, District of East Tennessee, Department of the Cumberland, to September 1865.

The 186th Ohio Infantry mustered out of service September 18, 1865, at Nashville, Tennessee, and was discharged September 25, 1865, at Columbus, Ohio.

== Detailed service ==
Left Ohio for Nashville, Tennessee, March 2. Moved to Murfreesboro, Tennessee, March 8, 1865; then to Cleveland, Tennessee, and duty there until May. Moved to Dalton, Georgia, May 2; then to Chattanooga, Tennessee, May 10, and duty there until July 20. Moved to Nashville, Tennessee, July 20, and duty there until September 19. Ordered to Columbus, Ohio, September 19, and mustered out September 25, 1865.

== Casualties ==
The regiment lost a total of 50 enlisted men during service; 1 killed and 49 due to disease.

== Commanders ==
- Colonel Thomas Francis Wilder

== See also ==
- List of Ohio Civil War units
- Ohio in the Civil War
