= 1894 North Dakota gubernatorial election =

- November 6, 1894
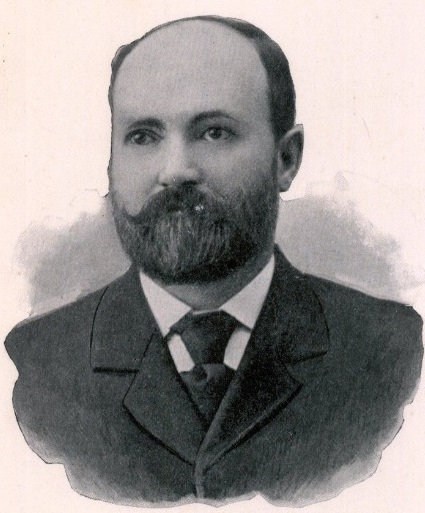

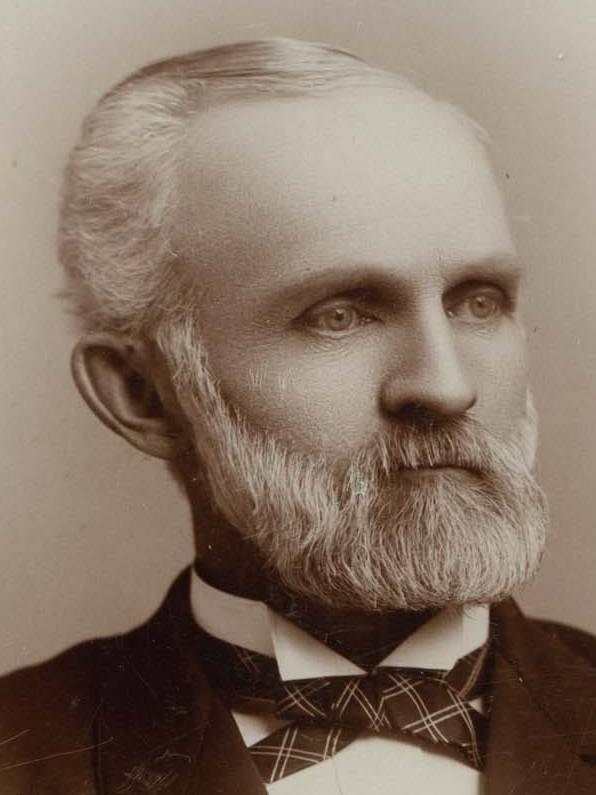

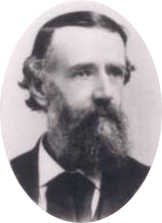
Nominee	Roger Allin	Elmer D. Wallace	F. M. Kinter
Party	Republican	Populist	Democratic
Popular vote	23,723	9,354	8,188
Percentage	55.76%	21.99%	19.24%
- County results Allin: 30–40% 40–50% 50–60% 60–70% 70–80% 80–90% No Data/Vote
Governor before election
Eli C. D. Shortridge
Populist
Elected Governor
Roger Allin
Republican

The 1894 North Dakota gubernatorial election was held on November 6, 1894. Republican nominee Roger Allin defeated People's Party nominee Elmer D. Wallace with 55.76% of the vote.

== General election ==
=== Candidates ===
Major party candidates

- Roger Allin, Republican
- F. M. Kinter, Democratic

Other candidates

- Elmer D. Wallace, People's
- (FNU) Reeves, Independent

=== Results ===
1894 North Dakota gubernatorial election
Party	Candidate	Votes	%	±%
Republican	Roger Allin	23,723	55.76	▲8.19
Populist	Elmer D. Wallace	9,354	21.99	▼30.44
Democratic	F. M. Kinter	8,188	19.24	N/A
Independent	(FNU) Reeves	1,283	3.02	N/A
Majority		14,369	33.77	▲28.92
Total votes		42,548	100.00	
Republican gain from Populist				
