= List of United States representatives in the 52nd Congress =

This is a complete list of United States representatives during the 52nd United States Congress listed by seniority.

As an historical article, the districts and party affiliations listed reflect those during the 52nd Congress (March 4, 1891 – March 3, 1893). Seats and party affiliations on similar lists for other congresses will be different for certain members.

Seniority depends on the date on which members were sworn into office. Since many members are sworn in on the same day, subsequent ranking is based on previous congressional service of the individual and then by alphabetical order by the last name of the representative.

Committee chairmanship in the House is often associated with seniority. However, party leadership is typically not associated with seniority.

Note: The "*" indicates that the representative/delegate may have served one or more non-consecutive terms while in the House of Representatives of the United States Congress.

== U.S. House seniority list ==
U.S. House seniority
Rank	Representative	Party	District	Seniority date (Previous service, if any)	No.# of term(s)	Notes
1	Richard P. Bland	D	MO-11	March 4, 1873	10th term	Dean of the House
2	James Henderson Blount	D	GA-06	March 4, 1873	10th term	Left the House in 1893.
3	Roger Q. Mills	D	TX-09	March 4, 1873	10th term	Resigned on March 29, 1892.
4	Charles O'Neill	R	PA-02	March 4, 1873; Previous service, 1863–1871.	14th term*	
5	William H. Forney	D	AL-07	March 4, 1875	9th term	Left the House in 1893.
6	David B. Culberson	D	TX-04	March 4, 1875	9th term	
7	Thomas J. Henderson	R	IL-07	March 4, 1875	9th term	
8	William McKendree Springer	D	IL-13	March 4, 1875	9th term	
9	Alfred C. Harmer	R	PA-05	March 4, 1877; Previous service, 1871–1875.	10th term*	
10	Hilary A. Herbert	D	AL-02	March 4, 1877	8th term	Left the House in 1893.
11	John H. Ketcham	R	NY-16	March 4, 1877; Previous service, 1865–1873.	12th term*	Left the House in 1893.
12	Thomas Brackett Reed	R	ME-01	March 4, 1877	8th term	
13	Henry H. Bingham	R	PA-01	March 4, 1879	7th term	
14	William H. Hatch	D	MO-01	March 4, 1879	7th term	
15	Leonidas C. Houk	R	TN-02	March 4, 1879	7th term	Died on May 25, 1891.
16	Benton McMillin	D	TN-04	March 4, 1879	7th term	
17	Ezra B. Taylor	R	OH-19	December 13, 1880	7th term	Left the House in 1893.
18	Newton C. Blanchard	D	LA-04	March 4, 1881	6th term	
19	William S. Holman	D	IN-04	March 4, 1881; Previous service, 1859–1865 and 1867–1877.	14th term**	
20	William C. Oates	D	AL-03	March 4, 1881	6th term	
21	Henry G. Turner	D	GA-02	March 4, 1881	6th term	
22	Nelson Dingley, Jr.	R	ME-02	September 12, 1881	6th term	
23	Robert R. Hitt	R	IL-06	December 4, 1882	6th term	
24	Louis E. Atkinson	R	PA-18	March 4, 1883	5th term	Left the House in 1893.
25	Charles A. Boutelle	R	ME-04	March 4, 1883	5th term	
26	Clifton R. Breckinridge	D	AR-02	March 4, 1883	5th term	
27	Charles Frederick Crisp	D	GA-03	March 4, 1883	5th term	Speaker of the House
28	Alexander Monroe Dockery	D	MO-03	March 4, 1883	5th term	
29	John J. Hemphill	D	SC-05	March 4, 1883	5th term	Left the House in 1893.
30	David B. Henderson	R	IA-03	March 4, 1883	5th term	
31	S. W. T. Lanham	D	TX-11	March 4, 1883	5th term	Left the House in 1893.
32	Seth L. Milliken	R	ME-03	March 4, 1883	5th term	
33	Samuel W. Peel	D	AR-05	March 4, 1883	5th term	Left the House in 1893.
34	Charles Stewart	D	TX-01	March 4, 1883	5th term	Left the House in 1893.
35	George D. Tillman	D	SC-02	March 4, 1883; Previous service, 1879–1882.	7th term*	Left the House in 1893.
36	William Lyne Wilson	D	WV-02	March 4, 1883	5th term	
37	Edward H. Funston	R	KS-02	March 21, 1884	5th term	
38	Charles Triplett O'Ferrall	D	VA-07	May 5, 1884	5th term	
39	John Mills Allen	D	MS-01	March 4, 1885	4th term	
40	James Buchanan	R	NJ-02	March 4, 1885	4th term	Left the House in 1893.
41	William Campbell Preston Breckinridge	D	KY-07	March 4, 1885	4th term	
42	Julius C. Burrows	R	MI-04	March 4, 1885; Previous service, 1873–1875 and 1879–1883.	7th term**	
43	William D. Bynum	D	IN-07	March 4, 1885	4th term	
44	Thomas C. Catchings	D	MS-03	March 4, 1885	4th term	
45	William H. H. Cowles	D	NC-08	March 4, 1885	4th term	Left the House in 1893.
46	William H. Crain	D	TX-07	March 4, 1885	4th term	
47	William W. Grout	R	VT-02	March 4, 1885; Previous service, 1881–1883.	5th term*	
48	John T. Heard	D	MO-06	March 4, 1885	4th term	
49	John S. Henderson	D	NC-07	March 4, 1885	4th term	
50	Binger Hermann	R	OR	March 4, 1885	4th term	
51	James B. McCreary	D	KY-08	March 4, 1885	4th term	
52	Joseph McKenna	R	CA-03	March 4, 1885	4th term	Resigned on March 28, 1892.
53	James O'Donnell	R	MI-03	March 4, 1885	4th term	Left the House in 1893.
54	Joseph H. Outhwaite	D	OH-09	March 4, 1885	4th term	
55	James D. Richardson	D	TN-05	March 4, 1885	4th term	
56	Joseph D. Sayers	D	TX-10	March 4, 1885	4th term	
57	William G. Stahlnecker	R	NY-14	March 4, 1885	4th term	Left the House in 1893.
58	William Johnson Stone	D	KY-01	March 4, 1885	4th term	
59	Joseph Wheeler	D	AL-08	March 4, 1885; Previous service, 1881–1882 and 1883.	6th term*	
60	Albert J. Hopkins	R	IL-05	December 7, 1885	4th term	
61	Thomas Chipman McRae	D	AR-03	December 7, 1885	4th term	
62	Harry Welles Rusk	D	MD-03	November 2, 1886	4th term	
63	Joseph Abbott	D	TX-06	March 4, 1887	3rd term	
64	John H. Bankhead	D	AL-06	March 4, 1887	3rd term	
65	Asher G. Caruth	D	KY-05	March 4, 1887	3rd term	
66	John Logan Chipman	D	MI-01	March 4, 1887	3rd term	
67	James E. Cobb	D	AL-05	March 4, 1887	3rd term	
68	William Cogswell	R	MA-07	March 4, 1887	3rd term	
69	John Dalzell	R	PA-22	March 4, 1887	3rd term	
70	Benjamin A. Enloe	D	TN-08	March 4, 1887	3rd term	
71	Ashbel P. Fitch	D	NY-13	March 4, 1887	3rd term	
72	Nils P. Haugen	R	WI-08	March 4, 1887	3rd term	
73	Walter I. Hayes	D	IA-02	March 4, 1887	3rd term	
74	Charles E. Hooker	D	MS-07	March 4, 1887; Previous service, 1875–1883.	7th term*	
75	Constantine B. Kilgore	D	TX-03	March 4, 1887	3rd term	
76	Edward Lane	D	IL-17	March 4, 1887	3rd term	
77	John Lind	R	MN-02	March 4, 1887	3rd term	Left the House in 1893.
78	Henry Cabot Lodge	R	MA-06	March 4, 1887	3rd term	Resigned on March 3, 1893.
79	Charles H. Mansur	D	MO-02	March 4, 1887	3rd term	Left the House in 1893.
80	Alexander B. Montgomery	D	KY-04	March 4, 1887	3rd term	
81	Littleton W. Moore	D	TX-08	March 4, 1887	3rd term	Left the House in 1893.
82	William Henry Fitzhugh Lee	D	VA-08	March 4, 1887	3rd term	Died on October 15, 1891.
83	Philip S. Post	R	IL-10	March 4, 1887	3rd term	
84	Charles Addison Russell	R	CT-03	March 4, 1887	3rd term	
85	Edward Scull	R	PA-20	March 4, 1887	3rd term	Left the House in 1893.
86	Benjamin F. Shively	D	IN-13	March 4, 1887; Previous service, 1884–1885.	4th term*	Left the House in 1893.
87	Francis B. Spinola	D	NY-10	March 4, 1887	3rd term	Died on April 14, 1891.
88	T. R. Stockdale	D	MS-06	March 4, 1887	3rd term	
89	Joseph D. Taylor	R	OH-18	March 4, 1887; Previous service, 1883–1885.	5th term*	Left the House in 1893.
90	Joseph E. Washington	D	TN-06	March 4, 1887	3rd term	
91	Justin Rice Whiting	D	MI-07	March 4, 1887	3rd term	
92	Charles Tracey	D	NY-19	November 8, 1887	3rd term	
93	James J. Belden	R	NY-25	November 8, 1887	3rd term	
94	Samuel Matthews Robertson	D	LA-06	December 5, 1887	3rd term	
95	John D. Alderson	D	WV-03	March 4, 1889	2nd term	
96	John F. Andrew	D	MA-03	March 4, 1889	2nd term	Left the House in 1893.
97	Horace F. Bartine	R	NV	March 4, 1889	2nd term	Left the House in 1893.
98	Charles Barwig	D	WI-02	March 4, 1889	2nd term	
99	Christopher A. Bergen	R	NJ-01	March 4, 1889	2nd term	Left the House in 1893.
100	Charles J. Boatner	D	LA-05	March 4, 1889	2nd term	
101	George H. Brickner	D	WI-05	March 4, 1889	2nd term	
102	Elijah V. Brookshire	D	IN-08	March 4, 1889	2nd term	
103	Marriott Henry Brosius	R	PA-10	March 4, 1889	2nd term	
104	Jason B. Brown	D	IN-03	March 4, 1889	2nd term	
105	David B. Brunner	D	PA-09	March 4, 1889	2nd term	Left the House in 1893.
106	John A. Buchanan	D	VA-09	March 4, 1889	2nd term	Left the House in 1893.
107	Robert Bullock	D	FL-02	March 4, 1889	2nd term	Left the House in 1893.
108	Benjamin H. Bunn	D	NC-04	March 4, 1889	2nd term	
109	John A. Caldwell	R	OH-02	March 4, 1889	2nd term	
110	Henry P. Cheatham	R	NC-02	March 4, 1889	2nd term	Left the House in 1893.
111	John Michael Clancy	D	NY-04	March 4, 1889	2nd term	
112	Richard Henry Clarke	D	AL-01	March 4, 1889	2nd term	
113	George W. Cooper	D	IN-05	March 4, 1889	2nd term	
114	James W. Covert	D	NY-01	March 4, 1889; Previous service, 1877–1881.	4th term*	
115	Jonathan P. Dolliver	R	IA-10	March 4, 1889	2nd term	
116	Edward J. Dunphy	D	NY-07	March 4, 1889	2nd term	
117	Paul C. Edmunds	D	VA-06	March 4, 1889	2nd term	
118	William Thomas Ellis	D	KY-02	March 4, 1889	2nd term	
119	George W. Fithian	D	IL-16	March 4, 1889	2nd term	
120	James Patton Flick	R	IA-08	March 4, 1889	2nd term	Left the House in 1893.
121	Roswell P. Flower	D	NY-12	March 4, 1889; Previous service, 1881–1883.	3rd term*	Resigned on September 16, 1891.
122	William St. John Forman	D	IL-18	March 4, 1889	2nd term	
123	Samuel Fowler	D	NJ-04	March 4, 1889	2nd term	Left the House in 1893.
124	Jacob Augustus Geissenhainer	D	NJ-03	March 4, 1889	2nd term	
125	Isaac Goodnight	D	KY-03	March 4, 1889	2nd term	
126	William E. Haynes	D	OH-07	March 4, 1889	2nd term	Left the House in 1893.
127	Posey G. Lester	D	VA-05	March 4, 1889	2nd term	Left the House in 1893.
128	Rufus E. Lester	D	GA-01	March 4, 1889	2nd term	
129	Clarke Lewis	D	MS-04	March 4, 1889	2nd term	Left the House in 1893.
130	Thomas F. Magner	D	NY-05	March 4, 1889	2nd term	
131	Augustus N. Martin	D	IN-11	March 4, 1889	2nd term	
132	Charles A. O. McClellan	D	IN-12	March 4, 1889	2nd term	Left the House in 1893.
133	Elijah A. Morse	R	MA-02	March 4, 1889	2nd term	
134	William Mutchler	D	PA-08	March 4, 1889; Previous service, 1875–1877 and 1881–1885.	5th term**	Left the House in 1893.
135	Richard Henry Norton	D	MO-07	March 4, 1889	2nd term	Left the House in 1893.
136	Joseph H. O'Neil	D	MA-04	March 4, 1889	2nd term	
137	James W. Owens	D	OH-14	March 4, 1889	2nd term	Left the House in 1893.
138	William F. Parrett	D	IN-01	March 4, 1889	2nd term	Left the House in 1893.
139	Thomas H. Paynter	D	KY-09	March 4, 1889	2nd term	
140	Rice Alexander Pierce	D	TN-09	March 4, 1889; Previous service, 1883–1885.	3rd term*	Left the House in 1893.
141	John A. Quackenbush	D	NY-18	March 4, 1889	2nd term	Left the House in 1893.
142	John Raines	R	NY-29	March 4, 1889	2nd term	Left the House in 1893.
143	Charles S. Randall	R	MA-01	March 4, 1889	2nd term	
144	James Bernard Reilly	D	PA-13	March 4, 1889; Previous service, 1875–1879.	4th term*	
145	John Winebrenner Rife	R	PA-14	March 4, 1889	2nd term	Left the House in 1893.
146	John Sanford	R	NY-20	March 4, 1889	2nd term	Left the House in 1893.
147	George W. Smith	R	IL-20	March 4, 1889	2nd term	
148	Samuel M. Stephenson	R	MI-11	March 4, 1889	2nd term	
149	Herman Stump	D	MD-02	March 4, 1889	2nd term	Left the House in 1893.
150	John Charles Tarsney	D	MO-05	March 4, 1889	2nd term	
151	Abner Taylor	R	IL-01	March 4, 1889	2nd term	Left the House in 1893.
152	Alfred A. Taylor	R	TN-01	March 4, 1889	2nd term	
153	Hosea Townsend	R	CO	March 4, 1889	2nd term	Left the House in 1893.
154	Henry St. George Tucker III	D	VA-10	March 4, 1889	2nd term	
155	Joseph H. Walker	R	MA-10	March 4, 1889	2nd term	
156	Scott Wike	D	IL-12	March 4, 1889; Previous service, 1875–1877.	3rd term*	Left the House in 1893.
157	John Henry Wilson	R	KY-11	March 4, 1889	2nd term	Left the House in 1893.
158	Washington F. Willcox	D	CT-02	March 4, 1889	2nd term	Left the House in 1893.
159	Myron Benjamin Wright	R	PA-15	March 4, 1889	2nd term	
160	John Pickler	R	SD	November 2, 1889	2nd term	
161	Amos J. Cummings	D	NY-09	November 5, 1889; Previous service, 1887–1889.	3rd term*	
162	John L. Wilson	R	WA	November 20, 1889	2nd term	
163	Sereno E. Payne	R	NY-27	December 2, 1889; Previous service, 1883–1887.	4th term*	
164	Andrew Price	D	LA-03	December 2, 1889	2nd term	
165	Robert Patterson Clark Wilson	D	MO-04	December 2, 1889	2nd term	Left the House in 1893.
166	James R. Williams	D	IL-19	December 2, 1889	2nd term	
167	John E. Reyburn	R	PA-04	February 18, 1890	2nd term	
168	William Worth Dickerson	D	KY-06	June 21, 1890	2nd term	Left the House in 1893.
169	Willis Sweet	R	ID	October 1, 1890	2nd term	
170	Charles Warren Stone	R	PA-27	November 4, 1890	2nd term	
171	Clarence D. Clark	R	WY	December 1, 1890	2nd term	Left the House in 1893.
172	Thomas J. Geary	D	CA-01	December 9, 1890	2nd term	
173	Sydenham Benoni Alexander	D	NC-06	March 4, 1891	1st term	
174	Lemuel Amerman	D	PA-11	March 4, 1891	1st term	Left the House in 1893.
175	Marshall Arnold	D	MO-14	March 4, 1891	1st term	
176	Clinton Babbitt	D	WI-01	March 4, 1891	1st term	Left the House in 1893.
177	Henry Bacon	D	NY-15	March 4, 1891; Previous service, 1886–1889.	3rd term*	Left the House in 1893.
178	Joseph Weldon Bailey	D	TX-05	March 4, 1891	1st term	
179	William Baker	P	KS-06	March 4, 1891	1st term	
180	Joseph H. Beeman	D	MS-05	March 4, 1891	1st term	Left the House in 1893.
181	Frank Eckels Beltzhoover	D	PA-19	March 4, 1891; Previous service, 1879–1883.	3rd term*	
182	Henry Wilbur Bentley	D	NY-23	March 4, 1891	1st term	Left the House in 1893.
183	William H. Brawley	D	SC-01	March 4, 1891	1st term	
184	John L. Bretz	D	IN-02	March 4, 1891	1st term	
185	Case Broderick	R	KS-01	March 4, 1891	1st term	
186	David A. Boody	D	NY-02	March 4, 1891	1st term	Resigned on October 13, 1891.
187	William W. Bowers	R	CA-06	March 4, 1891	1st term	
188	Thomas Bowman	D	IA-09	March 4, 1891	1st term	Left the House in 1893.
189	William A. B. Branch	D	NC-01	March 4, 1891	1st term	
190	William Jennings Bryan	D	NE-01	March 4, 1891	1st term	
191	Thomas L. Bunting	D	NY-33	March 4, 1891	1st term	Left the House in 1893.
192	Samuel T. Busey	D	IL-15	March 4, 1891	1st term	Left the House in 1893.
193	Allen R. Bushnell	D	WI-03	March 4, 1891	1st term	Left the House in 1893.
194	Walter Halben Butler	D	IA-04	March 4, 1891	1st term	Left the House in 1893.
195	Samuel Byrns	D	MO-10	March 4, 1891	1st term	Left the House in 1893.
196	Benjamin T. Cable	D	IL-11	March 4, 1891	1st term	Left the House in 1893.
197	Cornelius A. Cadmus	D	NJ-05	March 4, 1891	1st term	
198	Anthony Caminetti	D	CA-02	March 4, 1891	1st term	
199	Timothy J. Campbell	D	NY-08	March 4, 1891; Previous service, 1885–1889.	3rd term*	
200	James Capehart	D	WV-04	March 4, 1891	1st term	
201	James Castle	D	MN-04	March 4, 1891	1st term	Left the House in 1893.
202	William H. Cate	D	AR-01	March 4, 1891; Previous service, 1889–1890.	2nd term*	Left the House in 1893.
203	John W. Causey	D	DE	March 4, 1891	1st term	
204	Benjamin H. Clover	P	KS-03	March 4, 1891	1st term	Left the House in 1893.
205	Seth Wallace Cobb	D	MO-09	March 4, 1891	1st term	
206	Frank P. Coburn	D	WI-07	March 4, 1891	1st term	Left the House in 1893.
207	Barnes Compton	D	MD-05	March 4, 1891; Previous service, 1885–1890.	4th term*	
208	Frederick S. Coolidge	D	MA-11	March 4, 1891	1st term	Left the House in 1893.
209	William J. Coombs	D	NY-03	March 4, 1891	1st term	
210	Isaac N. Cox	D	NY-17	March 4, 1891	1st term	Left the House in 1893.
211	Nicholas N. Cox	D	TN-07	March 4, 1891	1st term	
212	William T. Crawford	D	NC-09	March 4, 1891	1st term	
213	John Crawford Crosby	D	MA-12	March 4, 1891	1st term	Left the House in 1893.
214	John T. Cutting	R	CA-04	March 4, 1891	1st term	Left the House in 1893.
215	Warren F. Daniell	D	NH-02	March 4, 1891	1st term	Left the House in 1893.
216	John Davis	P	KS-05	March 4, 1891	1st term	
217	David A. De Armond	D	MO-12	March 4, 1891	1st term	
218	Robert E. De Forest	D	CT-04	March 4, 1891	1st term	
219	John De Witt Warner	D	NY-11	March 4, 1891	1st term	
220	William W. Dixon	D	MT	March 4, 1891	1st term	Left the House in 1893.
221	Robert E. Doan	R	OH-10	March 4, 1891	1st term	Left the House in 1893.
222	Dennis D. Donovan	D	OH-06	March 4, 1891	1st term	
223	James I. Dungan	D	OH-13	March 4, 1891	1st term	Left the House in 1893.
224	Allan C. Durborow, Jr.	D	IL-03	March 4, 1891	1st term	
225	William Elliott	D	SC-07	March 4, 1891; Previous service, 1887–1890.	3rd term*	Left the House in 1893.
226	Thomas Dunn English	D	NJ-06	March 4, 1891	1st term	
227	William H. Enochs	R	OH-12	March 4, 1891	1st term	
228	James F. Epes	D	VA-04	March 4, 1891	1st term	
229	Robert W. Everett	D	GA-07	March 4, 1891	1st term	Left the House in 1893.
230	John R. Fellows	D	NY-06	March 4, 1891	1st term	
231	Melbourne H. Ford	D	MI-05	March 4, 1891; Previous service, 1887–1889.	2nd term*	Died on April 20, 1891.
232	Robert Washington Fyan	D	MO-13	March 4, 1891; Previous service, 1883–1885.	2nd term*	
233	John Rankin Gamble	R	SD	March 4, 1891	1st term	Died on August 14, 1891.
234	Martin K. Gantz	D	OH-04	March 4, 1891	1st term	Left the House in 1893.
235	Eugene Pierce Gillespie	D	PA-25	March 4, 1891	1st term	Left the House in 1893.
236	James S. Gorman	D	MI-02	March 4, 1891	1st term	
237	Benjamin F. Grady	D	NC-03	March 4, 1891	1st term	
238	Halbert S. Greenleaf	D	NY-30	March 4, 1891; Previous service, 1883–1885.	2nd term*	Left the House in 1893.
239	Matthew Griswold	D	PA-26	March 4, 1891	1st term	Left the House in 1893.
240	Osee M. Hall	D	MN-03	March 4, 1891	1st term	
241	Edwin Hallowell	D	PA-07	March 4, 1891	1st term	Left the House in 1893.
242	Kittel Halvorson	P	MN-05	March 4, 1891	1st term	Left the House in 1893.
243	John Taylor Hamilton	D	IA-05	March 4, 1891	1st term	Left the House in 1893.
244	William H. Harries	D	MN-01	March 4, 1891	1st term	Left the House in 1893.
245	Darius D. Hare	D	OH-08	March 4, 1891	1st term	
246	Michael D. Harter	D	OH-15	March 4, 1891	1st term	
247	Sherman Hoar	D	MA-05	March 4, 1891	1st term	Left the House in 1893.
248	Warren B. Hooker	R	NY-34	March 4, 1891	1st term	
249	Albert Cole Hopkins	R	PA-16	March 4, 1891	1st term	
250	George Van Horn	D	NY-24	March 4, 1891	1st term	Left the House in 1893.
251	George W. Houk	D	OH-03	March 4, 1891	1st term	
252	George Franklin Huff	R	PA-21	March 4, 1891	1st term	Left the House in 1893.
253	John A. T. Hull	R	IA-07	March 4, 1891	1st term	
254	Henry U. Johnson	R	IN-06	March 4, 1891	1st term	
255	George Johnstone	D	SC-03	March 4, 1891	1st term	Left the House in 1893.
256	Martin N. Johnson	R	ND	March 4, 1891	1st term	
257	Tom L. Johnson	D	OH-21	March 4, 1891	1st term	
258	William Atkinson Jones	D	VA-01	March 4, 1891	1st term	
259	Omer Madison Kem	P	NE-03	March 4, 1891	1st term	
260	John W. Kendall	D	KY-10	March 4, 1891	1st term	Died on March 7, 1892.
261	George Frederic Kribbs	D	PA-28	March 4, 1891	1st term	
262	John C. Kyle	D	MS-02	March 4, 1891	1st term	
263	Matthew D. Lagan	D	LA-02	March 4, 1891; Previous service, 1887–1889.	2nd term*	Left the House in 1893.
264	Oscar Lapham	D	RI-01	March 4, 1891	1st term	
265	John W. Lawson	D	VA-02	March 4, 1891	1st term	Left the House in 1893.
266	Thomas G. Lawson	D	GA-08	March 4, 1891	1st term	
267	Fernando C. Layton	D	OH-05	March 4, 1891	1st term	
268	Leonidas F. Livingston	D	GA-05	March 4, 1891	1st term	
269	Daniel N. Lockwood	D	NY-32	March 4, 1891; Previous service, 1877–1879.	2nd term*	
270	John B. Long	D	TX-02	March 4, 1891	1st term	Left the House in 1893.
271	Eugene F. Loud	R	CA-05	March 4, 1891	1st term	
272	Thomas Lynch	D	WI-09	March 4, 1891	1st term	
273	Stephen Mallory II	D	FL-01	March 4, 1891	1st term	
274	William McAleer	D	PA-03	March 4, 1891	1st term	
275	Edward F. McDonald	D	NJ-07	March 4, 1891	1st term	Died on November 5, 1892.
276	Lawrence E. McGann	D	IL-02	March 4, 1891	1st term	
277	William M. McKaig	D	MD-06	March 4, 1891	1st term	
278	William A. McKeighan	P	NE-02	March 4, 1891	1st term	
279	Luther McKinney	D	NH-01	March 4, 1891; Previous service, 1887–1889.	2nd term*	Left the House in 1893.
280	Adolph Meyer	D	LA-01	March 4, 1891	1st term	
281	Lucas M. Miller	D	WI-06	March 4, 1891	1st term	Left the House in 1893.
282	John L. Mitchell	D	WI-04	March 4, 1891	1st term	Resigned on March 3, 1893.
283	Charles L. Moses	D	GA-04	March 4, 1891	1st term	
284	Walter C. Newberry	D	IL-04	March 4, 1891	1st term	Left the House in 1893.
285	John G. Otis	P	KS-04	March 4, 1891	1st term	Left the House in 1893.
286	John Joseph O'Neill	D	MO-08	March 4, 1891; Previous service, 1883–1889.	4th term*	Left the House in 1893.
287	Charles H. Page	D	RI-02	March 4, 1891; Previous service, 1887.	2nd term*	Left the House in 1893.
288	Henry Page	D	MD-01	March 4, 1891	1st term	Resigned on September 3, 1892.
289	Josiah Patterson	D	TN-10	March 4, 1891	1st term	
290	John M. Pattison	D	OH-11	March 4, 1891	1st term	Left the House in 1893.
291	David Henry Patton	D	IN-10	March 4, 1891	1st term	Left the House in 1893.
292	Albert J. Pearson	D	OH-17	March 4, 1891	1st term	
293	John O. Pendleton	D	WV-01	March 4, 1891; Previous service, 1889–1890.	2nd term*	
294	George D. Perkins	R	IA-11	March 4, 1891	1st term	
295	H. Henry Powers	R	VT-01	March 4, 1891	1st term	
296	George W. Ray	R	NY-26	March 4, 1891; Previous service, 1883–1885.	2nd term*	
297	Isidor Rayner	D	MD-04	March 4, 1891; Previous service, 1887–1889.	2nd term*	
298	John Buchanan Robinson	R	PA-06	March 4, 1891	1st term	
299	Hosea H. Rockwell	D	NY-28	March 4, 1891	1st term	Left the House in 1893.
300	Leslie W. Russell	R	NY-22	March 4, 1891	1st term	Resigned on September 11, 1891.
301	Owen Scott	D	IL-14	March 4, 1891	1st term	Left the House in 1893.
302	John Joseph Seerley	D	IA-01	March 4, 1891	1st term	Left the House in 1893.
303	George W. Shell	D	SC-04	March 4, 1891	1st term	
304	George Washington Shonk	R	PA-12	March 4, 1891	1st term	Left the House in 1893.
305	Jerry Simpson	P	KS-07	March 4, 1891	1st term	
306	Henry C. Snodgrass	D	TN-03	March 4, 1891	1st term	
307	Herman W. Snow	D	IL-09	March 4, 1891	1st term	Left the House in 1893.
308	Lewis Sperry	P	CT-01	March 4, 1891	1st term	
309	Eli T. Stackhouse	D	SC-06	March 4, 1891	1st term	Died on June 14, 1892.
310	Moses T. Stevens	D	MA-08	March 4, 1891	1st term	
311	Lewis Steward	D	IL-08	March 4, 1891	1st term	Left the House in 1893.
312	Andrew Stewart	R	PA-24	March 4, 1891	1st term	Resigned on February 26, 1892.
313	William A. Stone	R	PA-23	March 4, 1891	1st term	
314	Bellamy Storer	R	OH-01	March 4, 1891	1st term	
315	Byron G. Stout	D	MI-06	March 4, 1891	1st term	Left the House in 1893.
316	Vincent A. Taylor	R	OH-20	March 4, 1891	1st term	Left the House in 1893.
317	William L. Terry	D	AR-04	March 4, 1891	1st term	
318	Louis Washington Turpin	D	AL-04	March 4, 1891; Previous service, 1889–1890.	2nd term*	
319	James Wolcott Wadsworth	R	NY-31	March 4, 1891; Previous service, 1881–1885.	3rd term*	
320	John G. Warwick	D	OH-16	March 4, 1891	1st term	Died on August 14, 1892.
321	Thomas E. Watson	D	GA-10	March 4, 1891	1st term	Left the House in 1893.
322	Daniel W. Waugh	R	IN-09	March 4, 1891	1st term	
323	Thomas A. E. Weadock	D	MI-10	March 4, 1891	1st term	
324	John M. Wever	R	NY-21	March 4, 1891	1st term	
325	Harrison H. Wheeler	D	MI-09	March 4, 1891	1st term	Left the House in 1893.
326	Frederick Edward White	D	IA-06	March 4, 1891	1st term	Left the House in 1893.
327	Archibald Hunter Arrington Williams	D	NC-05	March 4, 1891	1st term	Left the House in 1893.
328	George F. Williams	D	MA-09	March 4, 1891	1st term	Left the House in 1893.
329	Thomas E. Winn	D	GA-09	March 4, 1891	1st term	Left the House in 1893.
330	George D. Wise	D	VA-03	March 4, 1891; Previous service, 1881–1890.	6th term*	
331	Simon Peter Wolverton	D	PA-17	March 4, 1891	1st term	Left the House in 1893.
332	Henry M. Youmans	D	MI-08	March 4, 1891	1st term	Left the House in 1893.
	Charles E. Belknap	R	MI-05	November 3, 1891; Previous service, 1889–1891.	2nd term*	Left the House in 1893.
	Alfred C. Chapin	D	NY-02	November 3, 1891	1st term	Resigned on November 16, 1892.
	William Bourke Cockran	D	NY-10	November 3, 1891; Previous service, 1887–1889.	2nd term*	
	Newton M. Curtis	R	NY-22	November 3, 1891	1st term	
	Joseph J. Little	D	NY-12	November 3, 1891	1st term	Left the House in 1893.
	John C. Houk	R	TN-02	December 7, 1891	1st term	
	John L. Jolley	R	SD	December 7, 1891	1st term	Left the House in 1893.
	Elisha E. Meredith	D	VA-08	December 9, 1891	1st term	
	Alexander Kerr Craig	R	PA-24	February 26, 1892	1st term	Died on July 29, 1892.
	Joseph M. Kendall	D	KY-10	April 21, 1892	1st term	Left the House in 1893.
	Edwin Le Roy Antony	D	TX-09	June 14, 1892	1st term	Left the House in 1893.
	John Brewer Brown	D	MD-01	November 8, 1892	1st term	Left the House in 1893.
	Samuel G. Hilborn	R	CA-03	December 5, 1892	1st term	
	John L. McLaurin	D	SC-06	December 5, 1892	1st term	
	Lewis P. Ohliger	D	OH-16	December 5, 1892	1st term	Left the House in 1893.
	William Allen Sipe	D	PA-24	December 5, 1892	1st term	

== Delegates ==
Rank	Delegate	Party	District	Seniority date (Previous service, if any)	No.# of term(s)	Notes
1	John Thomas Caine	D	UT	November 7, 1882	6th term	
2	Antonio Joseph	D	NM	March 4, 1885	4th term	
3	Marcus A. Smith	D	AZ	March 4, 1887	3rd term	
4	David Archibald Harvey	R	OK	November 4, 1890	2nd term	

== See also ==
- 52nd United States Congress
- List of United States congressional districts
- List of United States senators in the 52nd Congress
