= Governor Burke =

Governor Burke may refer to:

- Andrew H. Burke (1850–1918), 2nd Governor of North Dakota
- John Burke (North Dakota politician) (1859–1937), 10th Governor of North Dakota
- Thomas Burke (North Carolina) (1747–1783), 3rd Governor of North Carolina
