= 1890 North Dakota gubernatorial election =

- November 4, 1890
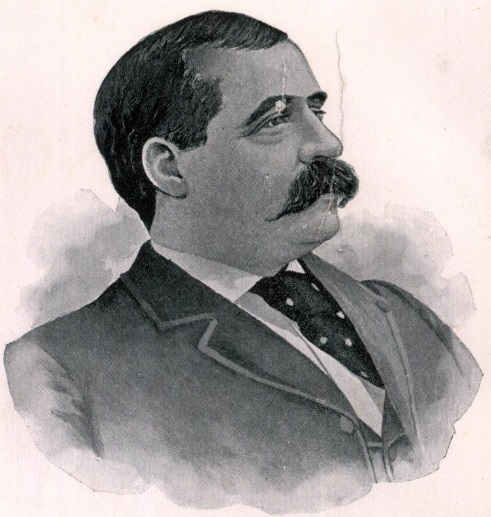

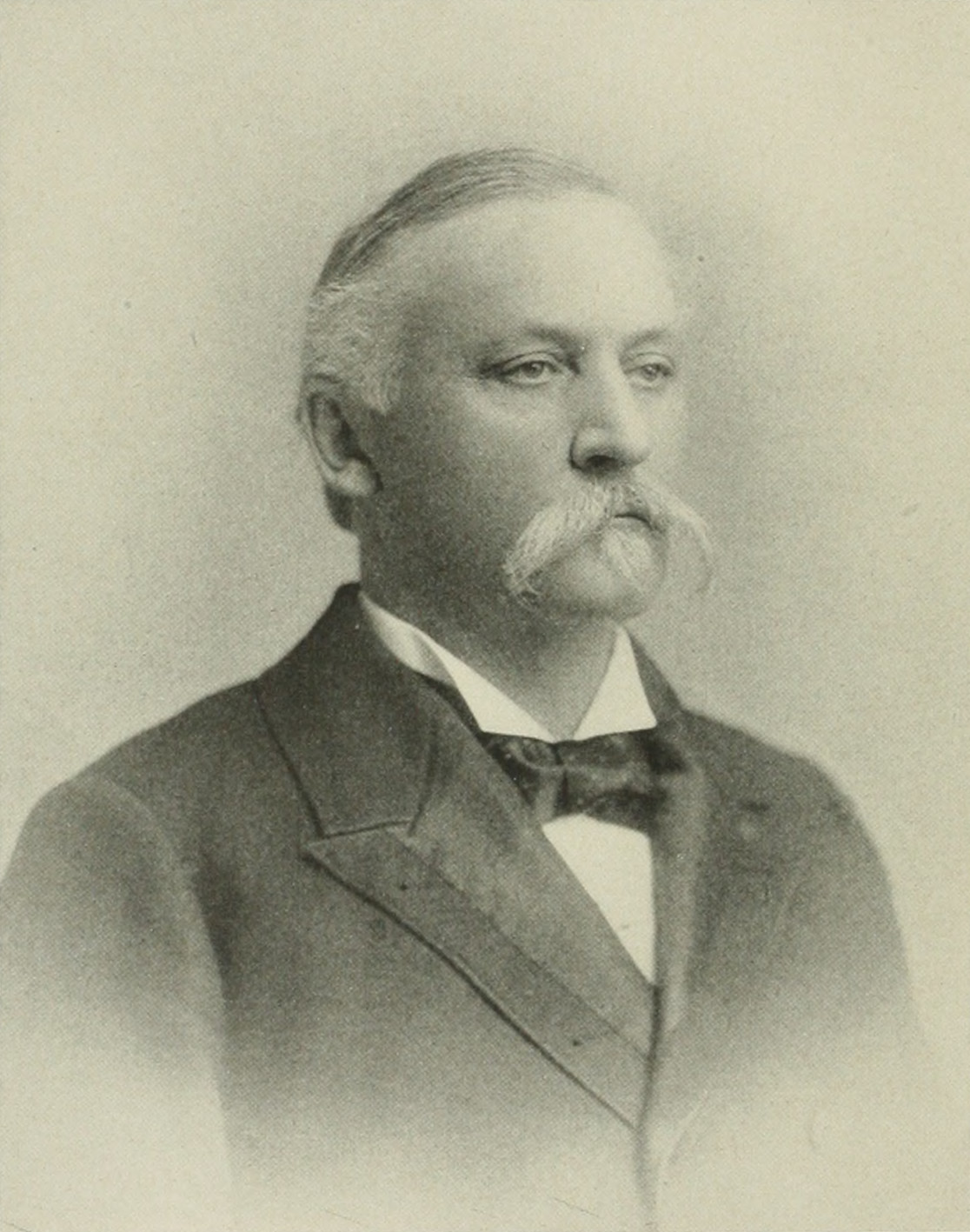

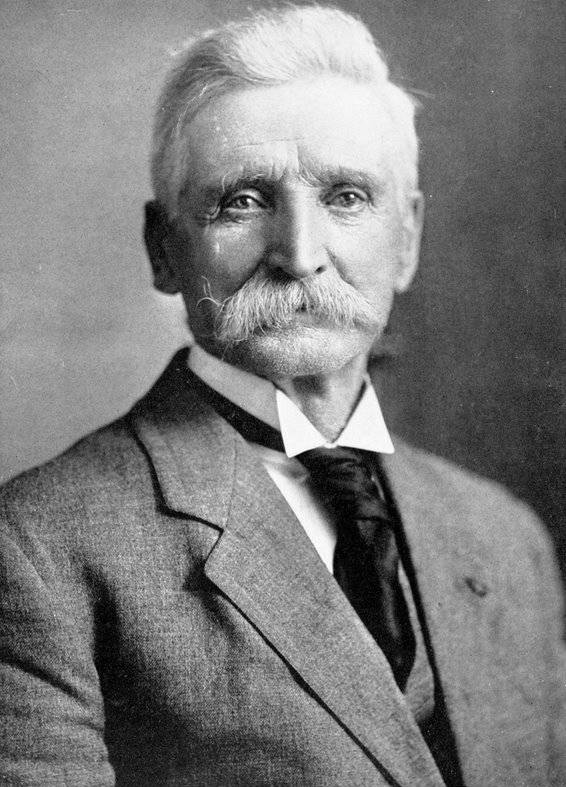
Nominee	Andrew H. Burke	William N. Roach	Walter Muir
Party	Republican	Democratic	Alliance
Popular vote	19,053	12,604	4,821
Percentage	52.23%	34.55%	13.22%
- County results Burke: 30–40% 40–50% 50–60% 60–70% 70–80% 80–90% Roach: 40–50% 50–60% 60–70% 70–80% Muir: 40–50% No Data/Vote
Governor before election
John Miller
Republican
Elected Governor
Andrew H. Burke
Republican

The 1890 North Dakota gubernatorial election was held on November 4, 1890. The incumbent Republican governor John Miller did not run for reelection. The Republican nominee Andrew H. Burke defeated Democratic nominee William N. Roach with 52.23% of the vote.

== General election ==
=== Candidates ===
Major party candidates

- Andrew H. Burke, Treasurer of Cass County (Republican)
- William N. Roach, member of the Territorial House of Representatives, candidate for governor in 1889 (Democratic)

Other candidates

- Walter Muir, Farmers' Alliance

=== Results ===
1890 North Dakota gubernatorial election
Party	Candidate	Votes	%	±%
Republican	Andrew H. Burke	19,053	52.23	▼14.35
Democratic	William N. Roach	12,604	34.55	▲1.13
Alliance	Walter Muir	4,821	13.22	N/A
Majority		6,449	17.68	▼15.48
Total votes		36,478	100.00	
Republican hold				
