= 1892 North Dakota gubernatorial election =

- November 8, 1892
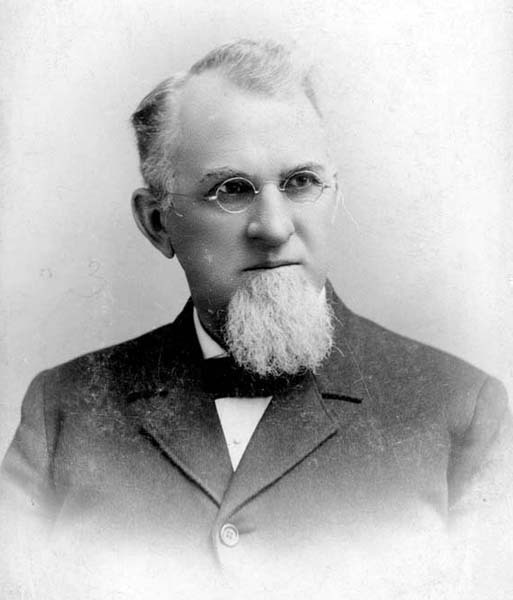

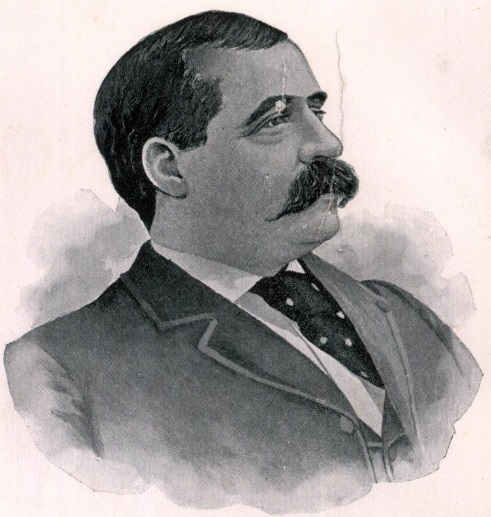
Nominee	Eli C. D. Shortridge	Andrew H. Burke
Party	Populist	Republican
Alliance	Democratic-Independent
Popular vote	18,995	17,236
Percentage	52.43%	47.57%
County results
Shortridge
50–60%
60–70%
70–80%
Burke
50–60%
60–70%
70–80%
80–90%
No Data/Vote
Governor before election
Andrew H. Burke
Republican
Elected Governor
Eli C. D. Shortridge
Populist

The 1892 North Dakota gubernatorial election was held on November 8, 1892. People's Party nominee Eli C. D. Shortridge defeated incumbent Republican Andrew H. Burke with 52.43% of the vote.

== General election ==
=== Candidates ===
- Eli C. D. Shortridge, People's
- Andrew H. Burke, Republican

=== Results ===
1892 North Dakota gubernatorial election
Party	Candidate	Votes	%	±%
Populist	Eli C. D. Shortridge	18,995	52.43	N/A
Republican	Andrew H. Burke (inc.)	17,236	47.57	▼4.66
Majority		1,759	4.85	▼12.83
Total votes		36,231	100.00	
Populist gain from Republican				
