= List of United States senators in the 52nd Congress =

This is a complete list of United States senators during the 52nd United States Congress listed by seniority from March 4, 1891, to March 3, 1893.

Order of service is based on the commencement of the senator's first term. Behind this is former service as a senator (only giving the senator seniority within their new incoming class), service as vice president, a House member, a cabinet secretary, or a governor of a state. The final factor is the population of the senator's state.

Senators who were sworn in during the middle of the Congress (up until the last senator who was not sworn in early after winning the November 1892 election) are listed at the end of the list with no number.

== Terms of service ==
Class	Terms of service of senators that expired in years
Class 1	Terms of service of senators that expired in 1893 (CA, CT, DE, FL, IN, MA, MD, ME, MI, MN, MO, MS, MT, ND, NE, NJ, NV, NY, OH, PA, RI, TN, TX, VA, VT, WA, WI, WV, and WY.)
Class 2	Terms of service of senators that expired in 1895 (AL, AR, CO, DE, GA, IA, ID, IL, KS, KY, LA, MA, ME, MI, MN, MS, MT, NC, NE, NH, NJ, OR, RI, SC, SD, TN, TX, VA, WV, and WY.)
Class 3	Terms of service of senators that expired in 1897 (AL, AR, CA, CO, CT, FL, GA, IA, ID, IL, IN, KS, KY, LA, MD, MO, NC, ND, NH, NV, NY, OH, OR, PA, SC, SD, VT, WA, and WI.)

== U.S. Senate seniority list ==
U.S. Senate seniority
Rank	Senator (party-state)	Seniority date	Other factors
1	George F. Edmunds (R-VT)	April 3, 1866	
2	Justin S. Morrill (R-VT)	March 4, 1867	
3	Matt W. Ransom (D-NC)	January 30, 1872	
4	William B. Allison (R-IA)	March 4, 1873	Former representative
5	John P. Jones (R-NV)	March 4, 1873	
6	Francis Cockrell (D-MO)	March 4, 1875	
7	Henry L. Dawes (R-MA)	March 4, 1875	
8	George F. Hoar (R-MA)	March 4, 1877	Former representative
9	Isham G. Harris (D-TN)	March 4, 1877	Former governor
10	John T. Morgan (D-AL)	March 4, 1877	
11	John R. McPherson (D-NJ)	March 4, 1877	
12	Matthew Butler (D-SC)	March 4, 1877	
13	Richard Coke (D-TX)	March 4, 1877	
14	Preston B. Plumb (R-KS)	March 4, 1877	
15	J. Donald Cameron (R-PA)	March 20, 1877	
16	Daniel W. Voorhees (D-IN)	November 6, 1877	
17	George G. Vest (D-MO)	March 4, 1879	Missouri 5th in population (1870)
18	Orville H. Platt (R-CT)	March 4, 1879	Connecticut 25th in population (1870)
19	Wilkinson Call (D-FL)	March 4, 1879	Florida 33rd in population (1870)
20	Zebulon Vance (D-NC)	March 4, 1879	
21	James L. Pugh (D-AL)	November 24, 1880	
22	John Sherman (R-OH)	March 4, 1881	Previously a senator
23	Eugene Hale (R-ME)	March 4, 1881	Former representative (10 years)
24	Joseph R. Hawley (R-CT)	March 4, 1881	Former representative (5 years)
25	James Z. George (D-MS)	March 4, 1881	Mississippi 18th in population (1870)
26	Arthur P. Gorman (D-MD)	March 4, 1881	Maryland 20th in population (1870)
27	Philetus Sawyer (R-WI)	March 4, 1881	
28	William P. Frye (R-ME)	March 18, 1881	
29	Nelson W. Aldrich (R-RI)	October 5, 1881	
30	Alfred H. Colquitt (D-GA)	March 4, 1883	
31	Shelby M. Cullom (R-IL)	March 4, 1883	Former governor
32	James F. Wilson (R-IA)	March 4, 1883	
33	Charles F. Manderson (R-NE)	March 4, 1883	
34	Joseph N. Dolph (R-OR)	March 4, 1883	
35	Randall L. Gibson (D-LA)	March 4, 1883	
36	John E. Kenna (D-WV)	March 4, 1883	
37	Henry M. Teller (R-CO)	March 4, 1885	Previously a senator
38	J. C. S. Blackburn (D-KY)	March 4, 1885	Former representative
39	James K. Jones (D-AR)	March 4, 1885	
40	Leland Stanford (R-CA)	March 4, 1885	Former governor
41	Edward C. Walthall (D-MS)	March 9, 1885	
42	George Gray (D-DE)	March 18, 1885	
43	James H. Berry (D-AR)	March 20, 1885	
44	John H. Mitchell (R-OR)	November 18, 1885	Previously a senator
45	William M. Stewart (R-NV)	March 4, 1887	Previously a senator (11 years)
46	David Turpie (D-IN)	March 4, 1887	Previously a senator (1 month)
47	John W. Daniel (D-VA)	March 4, 1887	Former representative
48	Francis B. Stockbridge (R-MI)	March 4, 1887	
49	William B. Bate (D-TN)	March 4, 1887	Former governor, Tennessee 12th in population (1880)
50	Cushman K. Davis (R-MN)	March 4, 1887	Former governor, Minnesota 26th in population (1880)
51	Matthew Quay (R-PA)	March 4, 1887	Pennsylvania 2nd in population (1880)
52	Charles J. Faulkner (D-WV)	March 4, 1887	West Virginia 29th in population (1880)
53	Algernon Paddock (R-NE)	March 4, 1887	
54	Rufus Blodgett (R-NJ)	March 4, 1887	
55	Frank Hiscock (R-NY)	March 4, 1887	
56	John H. Reagan (D-TX)	March 4, 1887	
57	Samuel Pasco (D-FL)	May 19, 1887	
58	James McMillan (R-MI)	March 4, 1889	
59	Edward O. Wolcott (R-CO)	March 4, 1889	
60	Anthony C. Higgins (R-DE)	March 4, 1889	
61	William D. Washburn (R-MN)	March 4, 1889	
62	John S. Barbour Jr. (D-VA)	March 4, 1889	
63	Nathan F. Dixon III (R-RI)	April 10, 1889	
64	William E. Chandler (R-NH)	June 18, 1889	
65	Richard F. Pettigrew (R-SD)	November 2, 1889	
66	Watson C. Squire (R-WA)	November 20, 1889	
67	John B. Allen (R-WA)	November 20, 1889	
68	Lyman R. Casey (R-ND)	November 25, 1889	
69	Wilbur F. Sanders (R-MT)	January 1, 1890	
70	Thomas C. Power (R-MT)	January 2, 1890	
71	John G. Carlisle (D-KS)	May 26, 1890	
72	Joseph M. Carey (R-WY)	November 15, 1890	
73	Francis E. Warren (R-WY)	November 24, 1890	
74	George L. Shoup (R-ID)	December 18, 1890	
75	John B. Gordon (R-GA)	March 4, 1891	Previously a senator
76	Jacob H. Gallinger (R-NH)	March 4, 1891	Former representative (4 years)
77	Henry C. Hansbrough (R-ND)	March 4, 1891	Former representative (2 years)
78	Fred Dubois (R-ID)	March 4, 1891	Former delegate
79	William F. Vilas (D-WI)	March 4, 1891	Former cabinet member
80	John M. Palmer (D-IL)	March 4, 1891	Former governor
81	Calvin S. Brice (D-OH)	March 4, 1891	Ohio 3rd in population (1880)
82	William A. Peffer (PP-KS)	March 4, 1891	Kansas 20th in population (1880)
83	John L. M. Irby (D-SC)	March 4, 1891	South Carolina 21st in population (1880)
84	James H. Kyle (R-SD)	March 4, 1891	South Dakota 37th in population (1880)
85	Edward D. White (D-LA)	March 4, 1891	
	Charles N. Felton (R-CA)	March 19, 1891	
	Horace Chilton (D-TX)	June 10, 1891	
	Bishop W. Perkins (R-KS)	January 1, 1892	
	David B. Hill (D-NY)	January 7, 1892	
	Roger Q. Mills (D-TX)	March 23, 1892	
	Eppa Hunton (D-VA)	May 28, 1892	
	Donelson Caffery (D-LA)	December 31, 1892	
	Johnson N. Camden (D-WV)	January 25, 1893	Previously a senator
	William Lindsay (D-KY)	February 15, 1893	

== See also ==
- 52nd United States Congress
- List of United States representatives in the 52nd Congress
