= Robert M. Knapp =

American politician

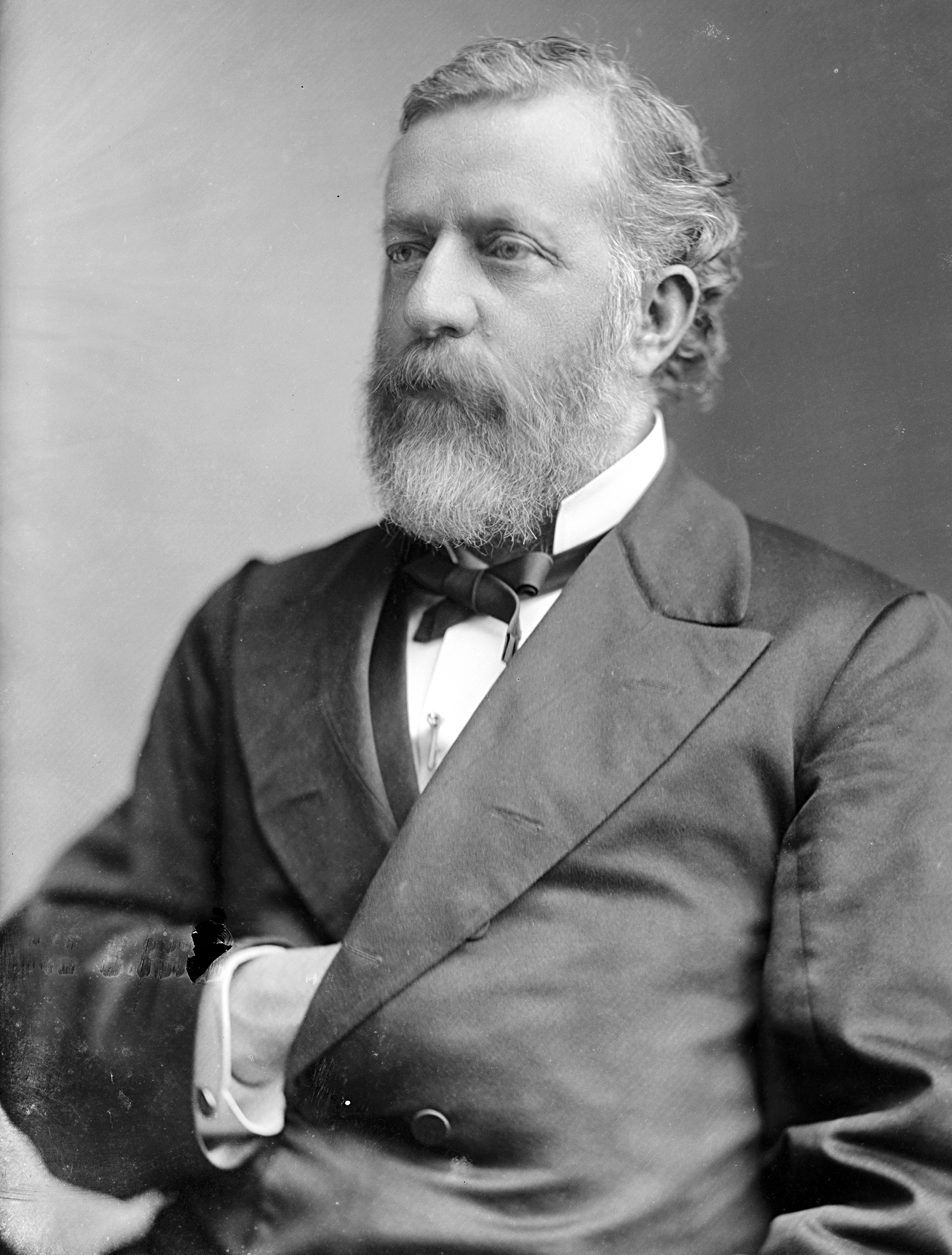

Member of the U.S. House of Representatives from Illinois's 11th district
- In office March 4, 1877 – March 3, 1879
- Preceded by: Scott Wike
- Succeeded by: James W. Singleton
- In office March 4, 1873 – March 3, 1875
- Preceded by: Samuel S. Marshall
- Succeeded by: Scott Wike

Personal details
- Born: April 21, 1831 New York City, New York
- Died: June 24, 1889 (aged 58) Jerseyville, Illinois
- Party: Democratic

Robert McCarty Knapp (April 21, 1831 – June 24, 1889) was a U.S. representative from Illinois, brother of Anthony Lausett Knapp.

Born in New York City, Knapp moved with his parents to Jerseyville, Illinois, in 1839. He attended the common schools and the Kentucky Military Institute in Frankfort, Kentucky. He studied law. He was admitted to the bar in 1855 and commenced practice in Jerseyville. He served as member of the Illinois House of Representatives in 1867. He served as mayor of Jerseyville 1871–1876.

Knapp was elected as a Democrat to the Forty-third Congress (March 4, 1873 – March 3, 1875). He was an unsuccessful candidate for reelection in 1874.

Knapp was elected to the Forty-fifth Congress (March 4, 1877 – March 3, 1879). He was again an unsuccessful candidate for reelection in 1878. He resumed the practice of law. He died in Jerseyville, Illinois, June 24, 1889. He was interred in Oak Grove Cemetery in Jerseyville.

U.S. House of Representatives
Preceded by Samuel S. Marshall	Member of the U.S. House of Representatives from Illinois's 11th congressional district 1873–1875	Succeeded by Scott Wike
Preceded by Scott Wike	Member of the U.S. House of Representatives from Illinois's 11th congressional district 1877–1879	Succeeded by James W. Singleton
