= William N. Roach =

Union Army soldier, politician (1840–1902)

William Roach
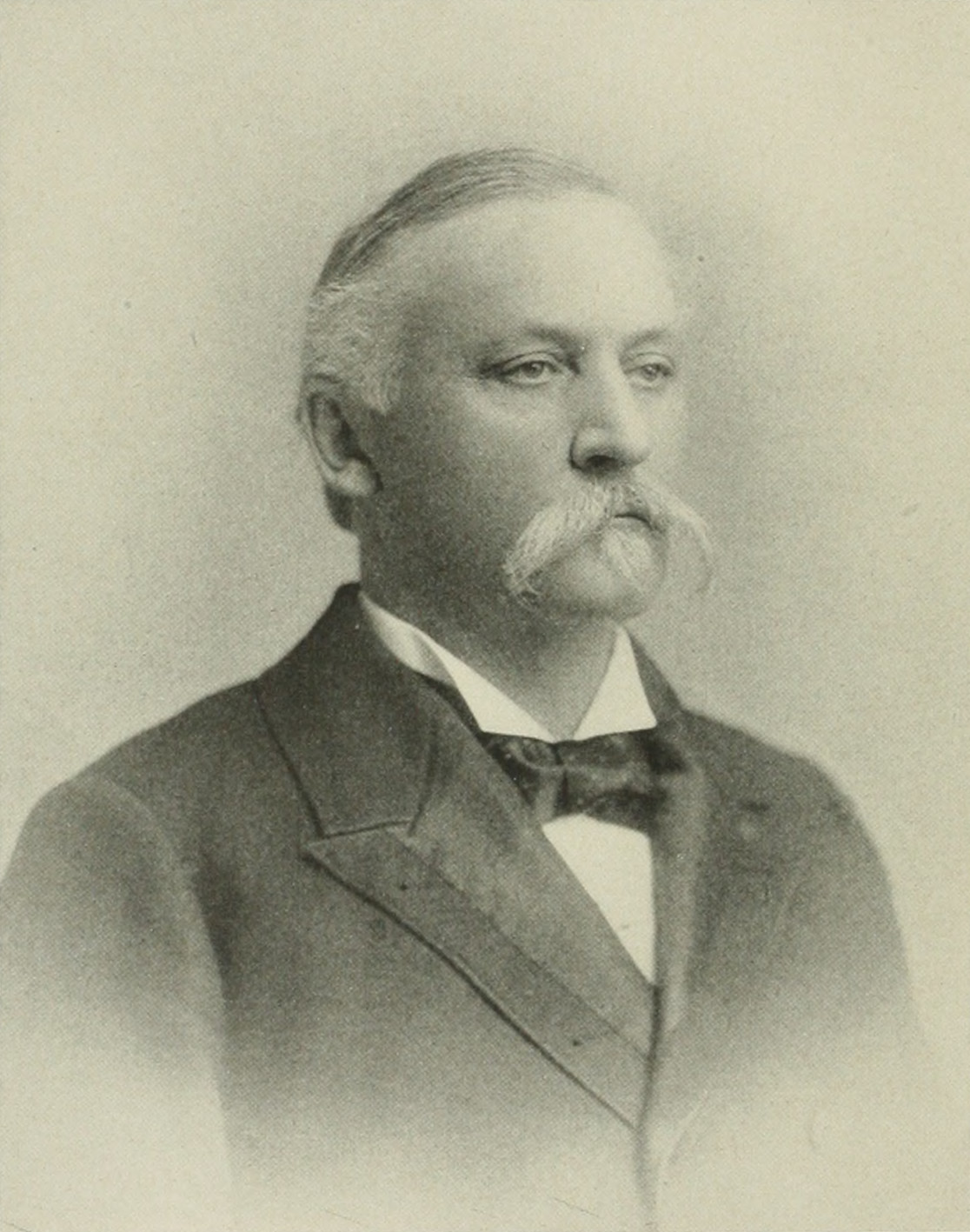

United States Senator from North Dakota
- In office March 4, 1893 – March 3, 1899
- Preceded by: Lyman R. Casey
- Succeeded by: Porter J. McCumber

Personal details
- Born: William Nathaniel Roach; September 25, 1840 Washington, D.C., U.S.
- Died: September 7, 1902 (aged 61) New York City, U.S.
- Party: Democratic
- Education: Georgetown University

William Nathaniel Roach (September 25, 1840 – September 7, 1902) was a United States senator from North Dakota.

== Biography ==
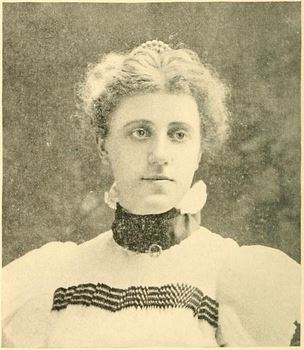
Miss Roach, daughter of William N. Roach

He was born in Washington D.C. to Edward Roach and Catherine (née Manning) Roach. He had four siblings. His father died in 1861. He attended Gonzaga College High School and Georgetown University. He was a clerk in the quartermaster's department during the Civil War. He moved to Dakota Territory in 1879 and settled in Larimore; he was interested in mail contracts for several years and was a member of the Territorial House of Representatives in 1885.

Roach was an unsuccessful Democratic candidate for governor at the first State election in 1889 and again in 1891. He was elected to the U.S. Senate and served from March 4, 1893, to March 3, 1899. In 1893, a subcommittee in the Senate was convened to hear evidence that Roach had embezzled money while acting as an officer of a bank. Expulsion was considered, but the subcommittee decided the matter was too long past to take such action. He was an unsuccessful candidate for reelection and discontinued active business pursuits and lived in retirement in Washington, D.C.

He died suddenly on September 7, 1902 while on a trip to New York City.

He was married to Verona E. (née Larkin) Roach. Together they had one daughter named Catherine Herron.

== See also ==
- List of United States senators expelled or censured

Party political offices
First	Democratic nominee for Governor of North Dakota; 1889, 1890	Succeeded by Eli C. D. Shortridge
U.S. Senate
Preceded by Lyman R. Casey	U.S. Senator (Class 1) from North Dakota; 1893–1899; Served alongside: Henry C. Hansbrough	Succeeded by Porter J. McCumber
