= William H. Gest =

American politician

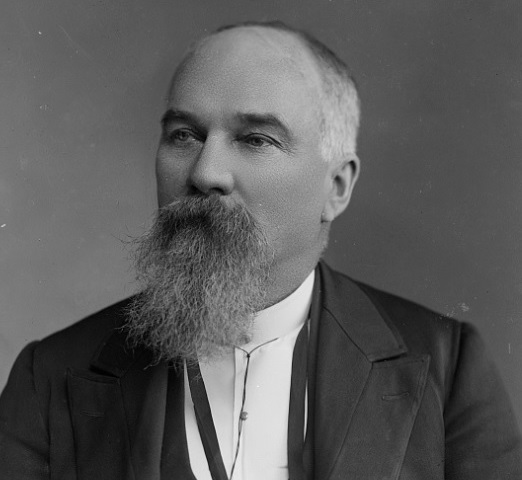
- C. M. Bell Studio Collection, Library of Congress

Member of the U.S. House of Representatives from Illinois's 11th district
- In office March 4, 1887 – March 3, 1891
- Preceded by: William H. Neece
- Succeeded by: Benjamin T. Cable

Personal details
- Born: January 7, 1838 Jacksonville, Illinois, U.S.
- Died: August 9, 1912 (aged 74) Rock Island, Illinois, U.S.
- Party: Republican

William Harrison Gest (January 7, 1838 – August 9, 1912) was a U.S. Representative from Illinois.

Born in Jacksonville, Illinois, Gest moved with his parents to Rock Island in 1842. He was graduated from Williams College, Williamstown, Massachusetts, in 1860. He studied law. He was admitted to the bar in 1862 and commenced practice in Rock Island, Illinois.

Gest was elected as a Republican to the Fiftieth and Fifty-first Congresses (March 4, 1887 – March 3, 1891). He was an unsuccessful candidate for reelection in 1890 to the Fifty-second Congress. Circuit judge of the fourteenth judicial district of Illinois from June 1897 until his death in Rock Island, Illinois, August 9, 1912. He was interred in Chippiannock Cemetery.

U.S. House of Representatives
Preceded by William Neece	Member of the U.S. House of Representatives from Illinois's 11th congressional district 1887–1891	Succeeded by Benjamin Cable
