= William H. Neece =

American politician

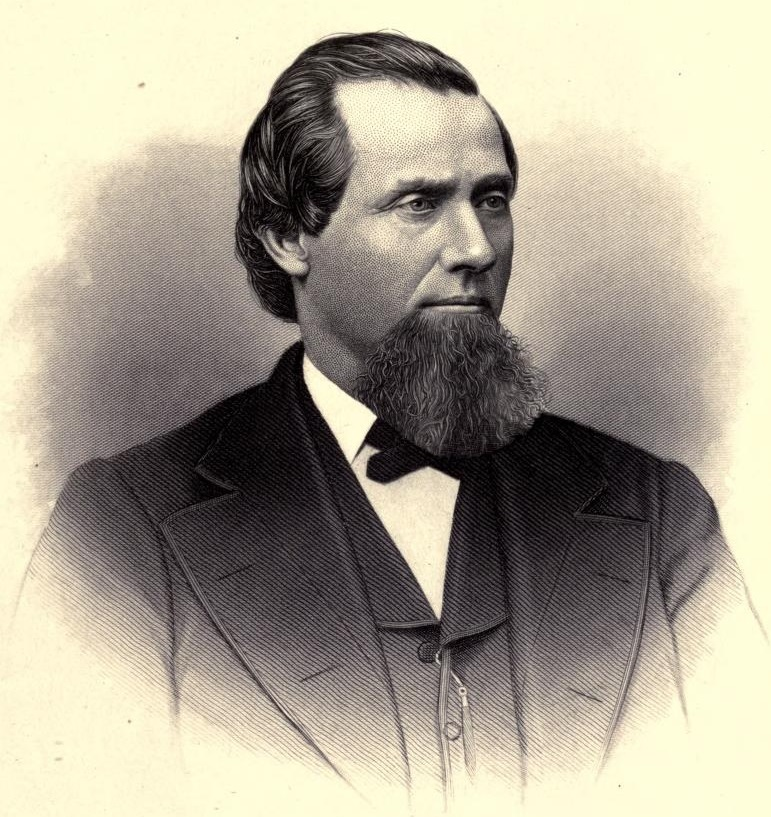
- From 1885's History of McDonough County, Illinois

Member of the U.S. House of Representatives from Illinois's 11th district
- In office March 4, 1883 – March 3, 1887
- Preceded by: James W. Singleton
- Succeeded by: William H. Gest

Member of the Illinois House of Representatives
- In office 1864-1870

Member of the Illinois Senate
- In office 1878-1882

Personal details
- Born: February 26, 1831 Springfield, Illinois
- Died: January 3, 1909 (aged 77) Chicago, Illinois
- Party: Democratic

William Henry Neece (February 26, 1831 – January 3, 1909) was a U.S. representative from Illinois.

Born near Springfield, Sangamon County (later part of Logan County), Illinois, Neece moved with his parents to McDonough County. He attended the common schools. He taught school. He studied law. He was admitted to the bar in 1858 and commenced practice in Macomb, Illinois. He served as member of the city council in 1861. He served as member of the State house of representatives in 1864 and 1870. He served as member of the State constitutional convention of 1869 and 1870. He served in the State senate 1878-1882.

Neece was elected as a Democrat to the Forty-eighth and Forty-ninth Congresses (March 4, 1883 – March 3, 1887). He was an unsuccessful candidate for reelection in 1886 to the Fiftieth Congress. He resumed the practice of his profession and also interested in stock raising. He died in Chicago, Illinois, January 3, 1909. He was interred in Oakwood Cemetery, Macomb, Illinois.

U.S. House of Representatives
Preceded by James W. Singleton	Member of the U.S. House of Representatives from Illinois's 11th congressional district 1883–1887	Succeeded by William Gest
