= Anthony L. Knapp =

American politician

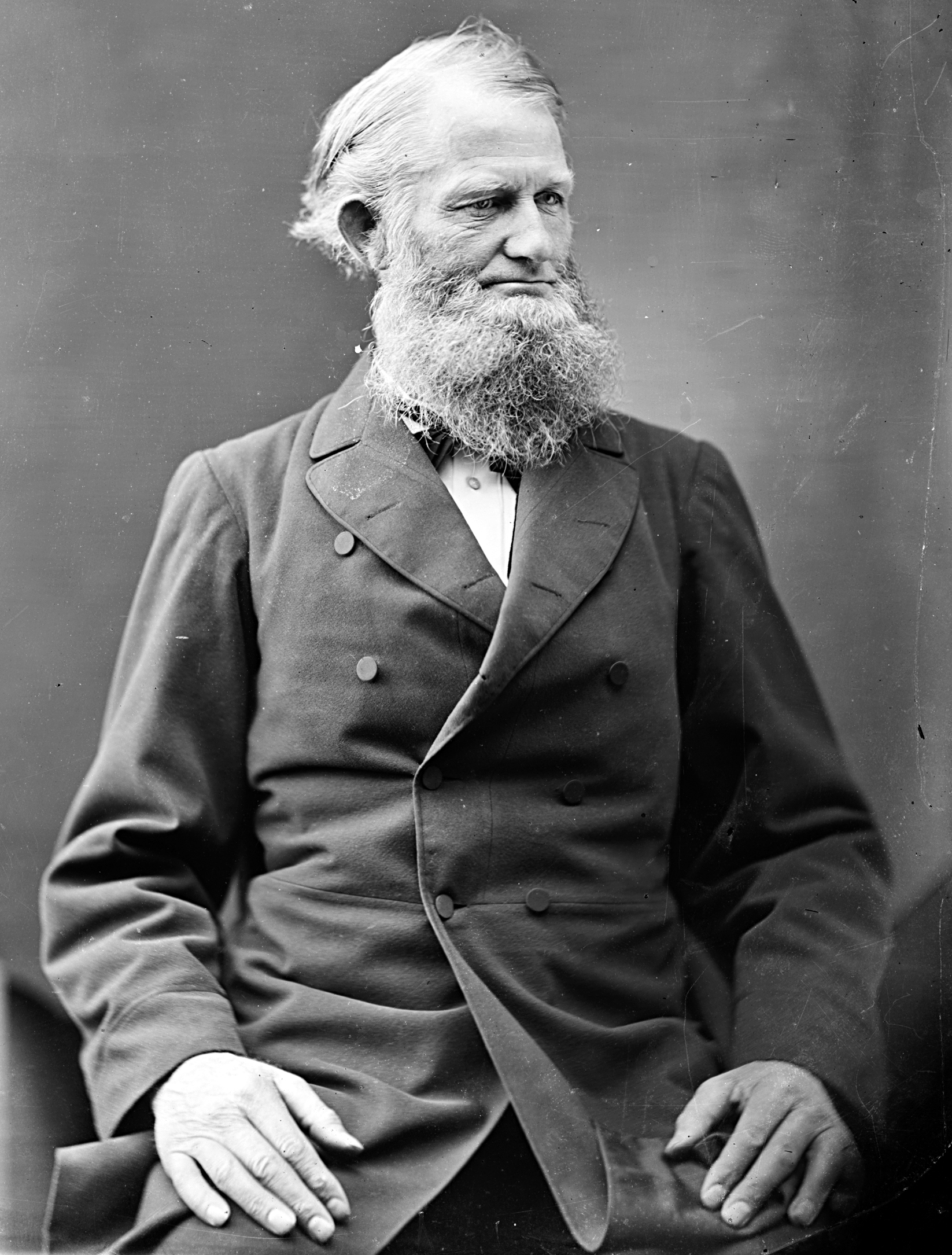
- Photograph by Mathew Brady, c. 1860–1875

Member of the U.S. House of Representatives from Illinois
- In office December 12, 1861 – March 4, 1865
- Preceded by: John A. McClernand (6th); District established (10th)
- Succeeded by: Jesse O. Norton (6th); Anthony Thornton (10th)
- Constituency: 6th district (1861-63); 10th district (1863-65)

Member of the Illinois Senate
- In office 1859-1861

Personal details
- Born: June 14, 1828 Middletown, New York, US
- Died: May 24, 1881 (aged 52) Springfield, Illinois, US
- Party: Democratic

Anthony Lausett Knapp (June 14, 1828 – May 24, 1881) was a U.S. representative from Illinois, brother of Robert McCarty Knapp.

Born in Middletown, New York, Knapp moved with his parents to Illinois in 1839 and settled in the city of Jerseyville. He completed preparatory studies and then studied law. He was admitted to the bar and commenced practice in Jerseyville. He served as member of the Illinois Senate 1859-1861.

Knapp was elected as a Democrat to the Thirty-seventh Congress to fill the vacancy caused by the resignation of John A. McClernand. He was reelected to the Thirty-eighth Congress and served from December 12, 1861, to March 3, 1865. He was not a candidate for renomination in 1864. He moved to Chicago in 1865 and to Springfield, Illinois, in 1867 and continued the practice of law. He died in Springfield, Illinois, May 24, 1881. He was interred in Springfield Cemetery. He was reinterred in Oak Grove Cemetery in Jerseyville.

== Early life ==
Born on June 14, 1828 in Orange County, New York, Knapp moved with his family to Greene County, Illinois with his parents at age eleven in 1839. The family remained there for five years before moving to Jerseyville, where the father, Augustus, became a top physician.

In 1847, at age nineteen, Knapp had served as a private secretary to Governor Augustus French, a Democrat.

In June 1849, at age twenty, Knapp along with his uncle Charles wrote a letter to Abraham Lincoln, in support of Lincoln's efforts to secure himself a political job as the Commissioner of the General Land Office in Washington. Lincoln had written to Knapp's father two days earlier asking for support. Knapp wrote to Lincoln that he, "accept the assurance of our best wishes for your success, and believe we remain very respectfully yours." The job ultimately went to Chicago attorney, Justin Butterfield.

== Politics ==
As a member of the House, Knapp routinely voted against Lincoln and his administration's policies. He was often aligned with the Copperhead congressman from Ohio, Clement Vallandigham. One modern writer states, "compared to [his predecessor] McClernand, Knapp sounded too concerned with opposing President Lincoln and less committed to the war effort."

U.S. House of Representatives
Preceded by John A. McClernand	Member of the U.S. House of Representatives from Illinois's 6th congressional district December 12, 1861 – March 3, 1863	Succeeded by Jesse O. Norton
Preceded by District created	Member of the U.S. House of Representatives from Illinois's 10th congressional district March 4, 1863 – March 3, 1865	Succeeded by Anthony Thornton
