= Orlando B. Ficklin =

American attorney and politician

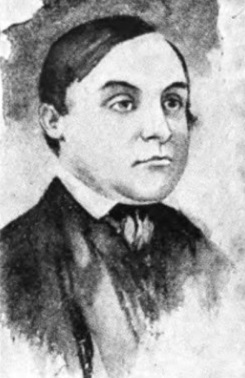
- From 1912's A Genealogical History of the Ficklin Family

Member of the U.S. House of Representatives from Illinois's 3rd district
- In office March 4, 1851 – March 3, 1853
- Preceded by: Timothy R. Young
- Succeeded by: Jesse O. Norton
- In office March 4, 1843 – March 3, 1849
- Preceded by: John T. Stuart
- Succeeded by: Timothy R. Young

Personal details
- Born: December 16, 1808 Scott County, Kentucky, US
- Died: May 5, 1886 (aged 77) Charleston, Illinois, US
- Resting place: Mound Cemetery, Charleston, Illinois
- Party: Democratic

Orlando Bell Ficklin (December 16, 1808 – May 5, 1886) was a U.S. representative from Illinois.

== Early life and education ==
Born in Scott County, Kentucky, Ficklin attended the common schools. He graduated from Transylvania Law School, Lexington, Kentucky, in 1830. He was admitted to the bar in 1830 and commenced practice in Mount Carmel, Illinois. He served in the Black Hawk War as quartermaster in 1832. He served as colonel of the militia of Wabash County in 1833.

== Political career ==
In 1835, Ficklin became state's attorney for the Wabash circuit. He was also a member of the Illinois House of Representatives in 1835, 1838, and 1842. He moved to Charleston, Illinois in 1837.

Ficklin was elected as a Democrat to the Twenty-eighth, Twenty-ninth, and Thirtieth Congresses (March 4, 1843 – March 3, 1849). He was chairman of the Committee on Public Buildings and Grounds (Twenty-ninth Congress).

=== Matson slave case ===
Although Ficklin worked as co-counsel with Abraham Lincoln on many cases, they were on opposite sides in possibly their most famous case. In 1847, Ficklin and his friend Charles H. Constable represented slaves who ran away while in Illinois and believed that they were free, arguing that the Northwest Ordinance forbade slavery in Illinois. Usher F. Linder and Abraham Lincoln defended Robert Matson, a Kentucky enslaver who brought the enslaved people from his Kentucky plantation to work on land he owned in Illinois. Lincoln invoked the right of transit, which allowed enslavers to take their slaves temporarily into free territory, stressing that Matson did not intend the enslaved people to remain permanently in Illinois.

The judge in Coles County ruled for Ficklin's clients and against Lincoln, and the enslaved people were set free. Illinois and other free states adopted the principle "once free, always free." Case law in both Northern and Southern states had established that while slaves in transit through a free state remained slaves, slaves domiciled in a free state were entitled to their freedom.

=== Environmental Perspective ===
Ficklin argued passionately that the federal government must develop the land, cultivating prairie even if such destroyed the native flowers and wild deer:

Unless the government shall grant head rights ... prairies, with their gorgeous growth of flowers, their green carpeting, their lovely lawns and gentle slopes will for centuries continue to be the home of wild deer and wolf, their stillness will be undisturbed by the jocund song of the farmer, and their deep and fertile soil unbroken by the plowshare. Something must be done to remedy this evil.

=== Return to Congress ===
Voters returned Ficklin to Congress in 1850, and he served in the Thirty-second Congress (March 4, 1851 – March 3, 1853). During that session, Ficklin was chair of the Committee on the District of Columbia (Thirty-second Congress). He resumed the practice of law in Charleston. He served as delegate to the Democratic National Convention in 1856, 1860, and 1864.

In the summer of 1864, Ficklin led a delegation to Washington to secure the release of 15 Coles County men arrested by military authorities for rioting. He requested they be returned to civilian authorities for indictment and trial, and the President granted his request about a week before the November election.

=== After Lincoln's presidency ===
Although a Democrat in an area known for its Copperhead leanings, Ficklin eulogized Lincoln as a statesman and lamented his death.

Ficklin was a delegate to the State constitutional convention in 1869 and 1870. He again served in the Illinois House of Representatives in 1878.

== Death and legacy ==
Ficklin died in Charleston, Illinois, and was interred in Mound Cemetery.

== See also ==
- Charles H. Constable, attorney, judge, and friend of Ficklin.

U.S. House of Representatives
Preceded by John T. Stuart	Member of the U.S. House of Representatives from Illinois's 3rd congressional district 1843-1849	Succeeded by Timothy R. Young
Preceded by Timothy R. Young	Member of the U.S. House of Representatives from Illinois's 3rd congressional district 1851-1853	Succeeded by Jesse O. Norton
