= Eli C. D. Shortridge =

American politician

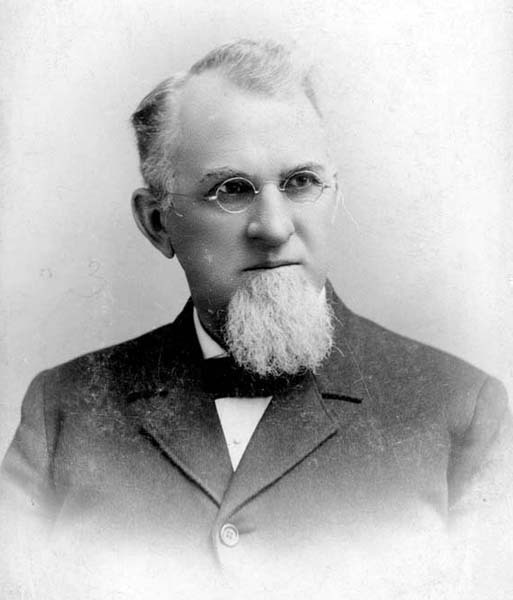

3rd Governor of North Dakota
- In office January 3, 1893 – January 10, 1895
- Lieutenant: Elmer D. Wallace
- Preceded by: Andrew H. Burke
- Succeeded by: Roger Allin

Personal details
- Born: March 29, 1830 Cabell County, Virginia, US (now Cabell County, West Virginia)
- Died: February 4, 1908 (aged 77) Devils Lake, North Dakota, US
- Party: North Dakota Democratic-Independent Party

Eli C. D. Shortridge (March 29, 1830 – February 4, 1908) was an American politician who was the third governor of North Dakota from 1893 to 1895. Shortridge was the first governor to live in the executive mansion.

== Biography ==
Born Eli Charles Daniel Shortridge, he was the eighth of nine children born to Levi and Elizabeth Love Shortridge. Shortridge was born in Cabell County (in modern-day West Virginia; the county was still a part of Virginia at the time of his birth), and grew up in Monroe County, Missouri. He completed his education at an academy located near Paris, Missouri. He moved to Larimore, Dakota Territory with his family, second wife Anna Burton and twin daughters, in 1882.

== Career ==
Shortridge ran for governor ten years later in 1893 on a fusion ticket composed of Populists, Democrats, and the Farmers' Alliance, who merged into a single Democratic-Independent Party. The new party was very successful, but very short-lived; the party dissolved soon after Shortridge's retirement.

During his administration, Shortridge approved the issuance of $50,000 in bonds to construct the south wing of the state capitol and approved the purchase of an executive mansion for the governor's residence. He also supported an appropriation for a state elevator at Duluth, Minnesota. An out-of-state terminal elevator was not constructed largely due to a provision requiring North Dakota sovereignty over any elevator site. The bill passed, but the provision that Minnesota or Wisconsin would have to cede sovereignty over the site created an unacceptable situation for both states. Governor Shortridge retired from office after one term. He was appointed clerk of the United States General Land Office at Devils Lake, North Dakota.

After the death of Anna, Shortridge married a third time to Dorcas Virginia Brady and they had five children.

== Death ==
Shortridge died on February 4, 1908, and is interred at Devil's Lake Cemetery, Devil's Lake, North Dakota.

Party political offices
Preceded by William N. Roach	Democratic nominee for Governor of North Dakota; 1892	Succeeded by F. Kinter
First	Populist nominee for Governor of North Dakota; 1892	Succeeded by Elmer D. Wallace
Political offices
Preceded by Andrew H. Burke	Governor of North Dakota; 1893–1895	Succeeded by Roger Allin
