= Oak Grove Cemetery (Jerseyville, Illinois) =

Cemetery in Jersey County, Illinois

Coordinates: 39.12504°N 90.31616°W

- Interactive map of Oak Grove Cemetery

Details
- Established: January 18, 1856
- Location: Jerseyville, Illinois
- Country: United States
- Find a Grave: Oak Grove Cemetery

Oak Grove Cemetery, established on January 18, 1856 is a cemetery located in Jerseyville, Illinois, in the northeastern portion of the city. Originally, 10 acres (40,000 m^{2}) were purchased for the cemetery's use. Today, the cemetery covers 47 acres (190,000 m^{2}).

== Notable burials ==
- Larry Chappell – former Major League Baseball player
- Anthony L. Knapp – U.S. Representative from Illinois
- Robert M. Knapp – U.S. Representative from Illinois
