= George A. Anderson =

American politician (1853–1896)

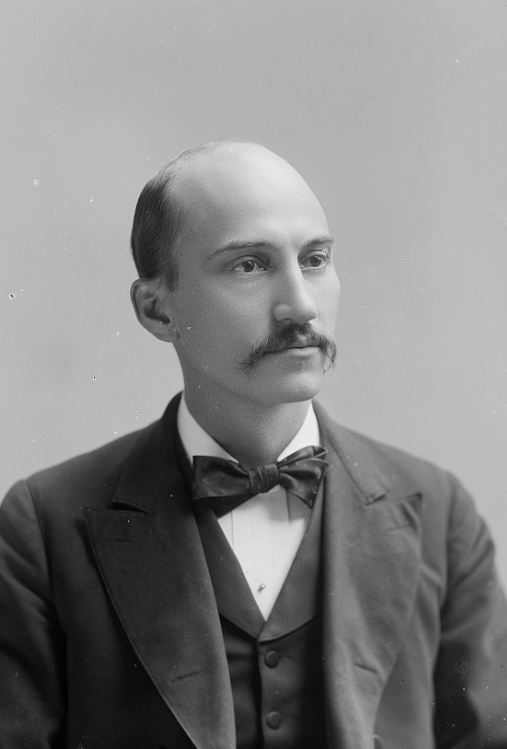

Member of the U.S. House of Representatives from Illinois's 12th district
- In office March 4, 1887 – March 3, 1889
- Preceded by: James M. Riggs
- Succeeded by: Scott Wike

Personal details
- Born: March 11, 1853 Botetourt County, Virginia, US
- Died: January 31, 1896 (aged 42) Quincy, Illinois, US
- Party: Democratic

George Alburtus Anderson (March 11, 1853 – January 31, 1896) was a U.S. representative from Illinois.

Born in Botetourt County, Virginia, Anderson moved to Illinois in 1855 with his parents, who settled in Hancock County. He attended the common schools. He was graduated from Carthage (Illinois) College in 1876. He studied law in Lincoln, Nebraska, and Sedalia, Missouri. He was admitted to the bar in 1878 and commenced practice in Quincy, Illinois, in 1880. He was an unsuccessful candidate for city attorney of Quincy in 1883.

Anderson was elected city attorney in 1884 and again in 1885.

Anderson was elected as a Democrat to the Fiftieth Congress (March 4, 1887 – March 3, 1889). He declined to be a candidate for renomination in 1888. He engaged in the practice of law until his death in Quincy, Illinois, January 31, 1896. He was interred in Woodlawn Cemetery.

U.S. House of Representatives
Preceded by James M. Riggs	Member of the U.S. House of Representatives from Illinois's 12th congressional district 1887-1889	Succeeded by Scott Wike
