= John H. Worst =

American politician

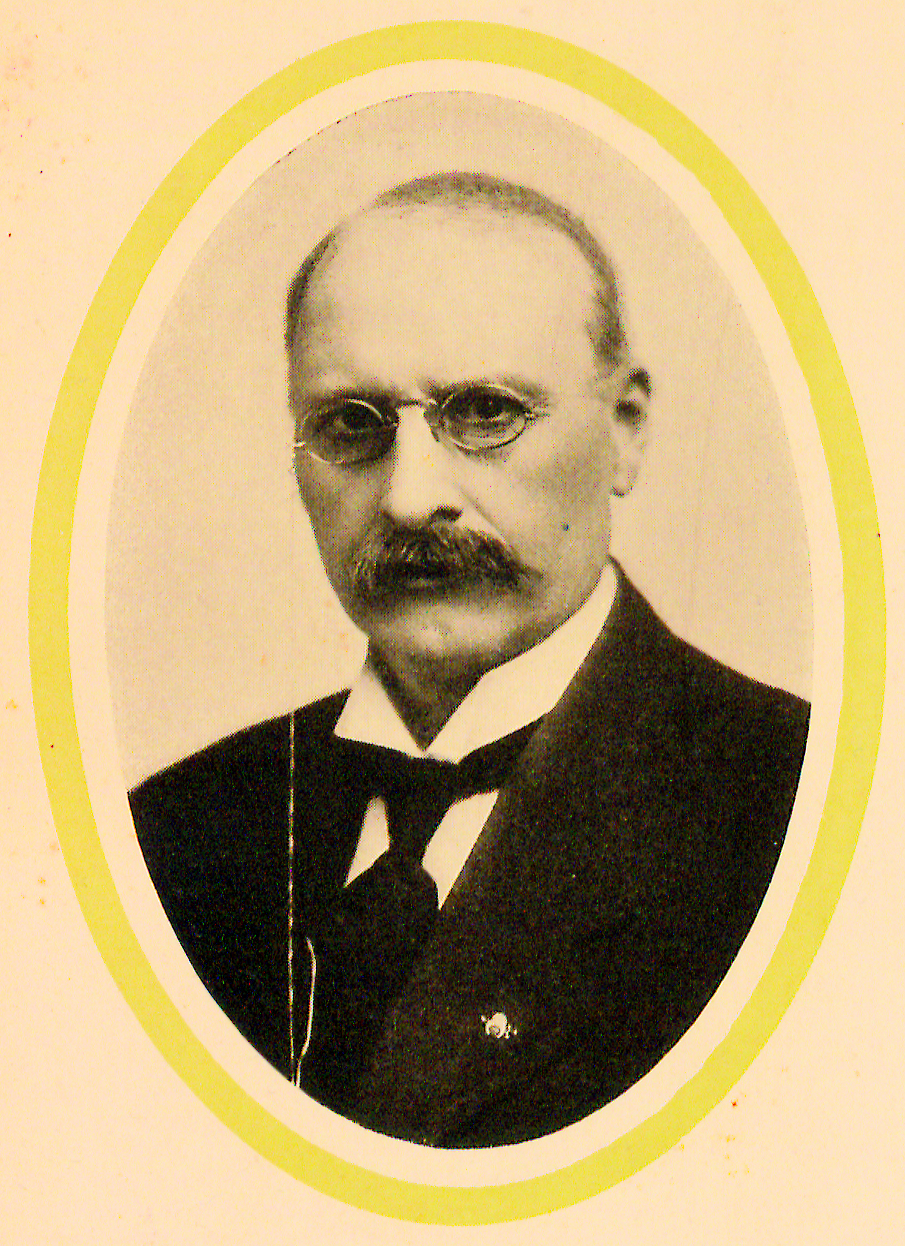

4th Lieutenant Governor of North Dakota
- In office 1895–1897
- Governor: Roger Allin
- Preceded by: Elmer D. Wallace
- Succeeded by: Joseph M. Devine

President pro tempore of the North Dakota Senate
- In office January 3, 1893 – January 8, 1895
- Preceded by: Nahum B. Pinkham
- Succeeded by: John E. Haggart

Member of the North Dakota Senate from the 26th district
- In office November 19, 1889 – January 8, 1895
- Preceded by: None (office established)
- Succeeded by: John H. Wishek

Personal details
- Born: John Henry Worst; December 23, 1850 Ashland County, Ohio, U.S.
- Died: September 25, 1945 (aged 94) Los Angeles, California, U.S.
- Party: Republican
- Occupation: educator, academic administrator

John Henry Worst (December 23, 1850 – September 25, 1945) was a North Dakota Republican Party politician and school administrator. He served as the fourth lieutenant governor of North Dakota (1895–1897) under Governor Roger Allin. Worst also served in the North Dakota Senate from 1889 to 1894.

Worst has also involved in education. In the 1880s, he was elected superintendent of schools for Emmons County and served in that role for six years. He served as the president of the North Dakota Agricultural College (now North Dakota State University) from 1895 to 1916.

Worst served as the Commissioner of Immigration for North Dakota from 1919 to 1923.

== See also ==
- List of presidents of North Dakota State University
- Lieutenant Governor of North Dakota
