= Alfred Dickey =

American politician

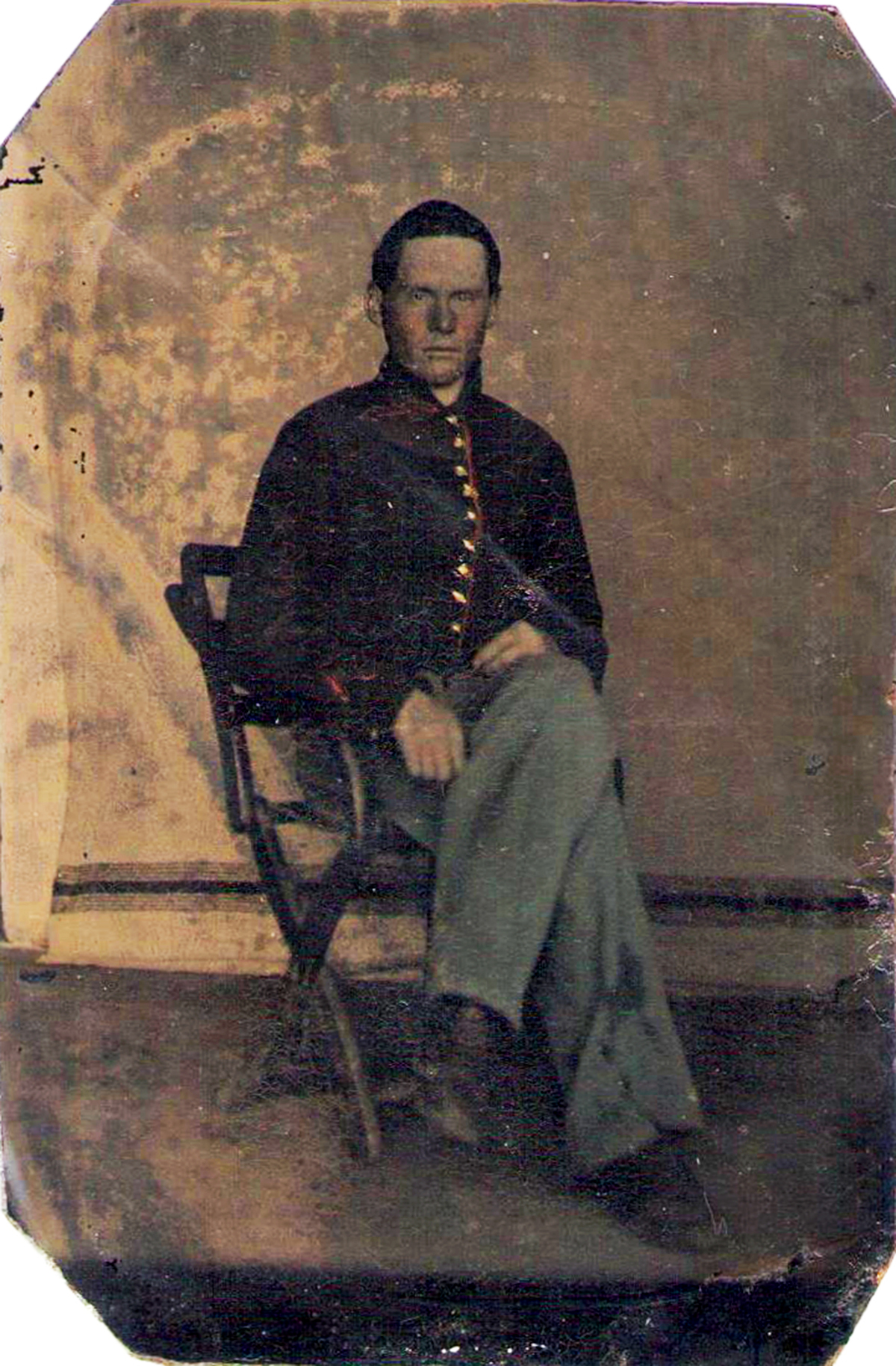
Alfred Dickey

Alfred M. Dickey (June 10, 1846 – January 26, 1901) was the first lieutenant governor of North Dakota, serving from 1889 to 1891 under Governor John Miller. He was a prominent resident of Jamestown, North Dakota.

Political offices
Preceded by None	Lieutenant Governor of North Dakota; 1889–1891	Succeeded by Roger Allin
