= Elmer D. Wallace =

American politician

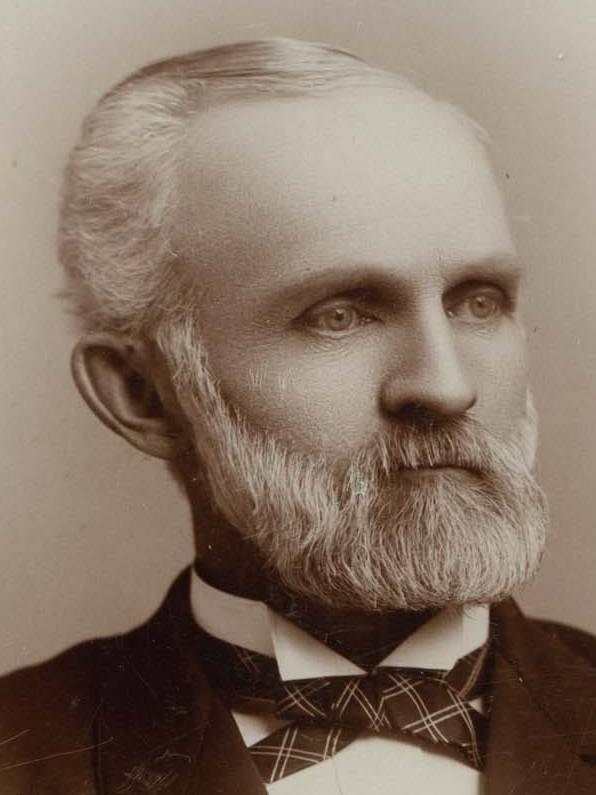

3rd Lieutenant Governor of North Dakota
- In office 1893–1895
- Governor: Eli C. D. Shortridge
- Preceded by: Roger Allin
- Succeeded by: John H. Worst

Personal details
- Born: July 5, 1844; Macomb County, Michigan, U.S.
- Died: May 21, 1928 (aged 83); Minneapolis, Minnesota, U.S.
- Political party: North Dakota Democratic-Independent Party
- Spouse: Annie L. Briggs (m. 1871; died 1927)
- Children: 2
- Occupation: businessman

Elmer D. Wallace (July 5, 1844 – May 21, 1928) was an American politician in the state of North Dakota. He served as the third lieutenant governor of North Dakota from 1893 to 1895 under Governor Eli C. D. Shortridge.

Wallace was born in Macomb County, Michigan in 1844, the son of Robert H. and Sylvia (née Steward) Wallace. He was raised in Detroit, where he moved at the age of 8. Wallace served in the United States Civil War in the Union Army, fighting with the 24th Michigan Infantry Regiment of the Iron Brigade, initially as the regimental hospital steward then was commissioned a First Lieutenant in 1864 before being discharged in June, 1865. After the war, he worked as a druggist and in the produce business in Michigan before relocating to Dakota Territory in 1881 to a farm in Edendale Township in Steele County, North Dakota. He served as a delegate to the North Dakota constitutional convention of 1889 and as chairman of the committee on public debts and public works for the state. Wallace served as lieutenant governor as an independent Democrat under Eli C. D. Shortridge from 1893 to 1895. He later moved to Minneapolis in 1906 and died there at his daughter's home on May 21, 1928.

Party political offices
Preceded by Eli C. D. Shortridge	Populist nominee for Governor of North Dakota; 1894	Succeeded by Robert B. Richardson
