= Roger Allin =

American politician (1848–1936)

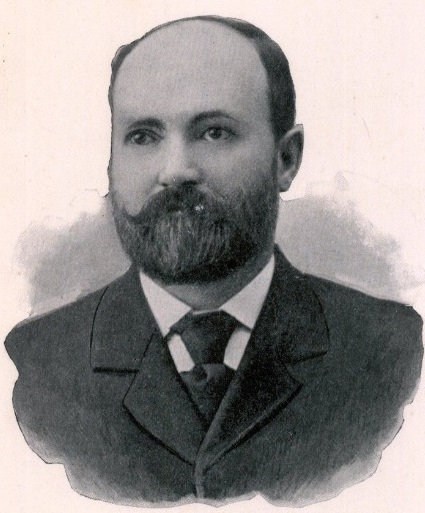
- From the 1897 atlas North Dakota and Richland County Chart

4th Governor of North Dakota
- In office January 10, 1895 – January 6, 1897
- Lieutenant: John H. Worst
- Preceded by: Eli C. D. Shortridge
- Succeeded by: Frank A. Briggs

2nd Lieutenant Governor of North Dakota
- In office January 7, 1891 – January 3, 1893
- Governor: Andrew H. Burke
- Preceded by: Alfred Dickey
- Succeeded by: Elmer D. Wallace

Member of the North Dakota Senate
- In office 1889–1891

Personal details
- Born: December 18, 1848 Devonshire, U.K.
- Died: January 1, 1936 (aged 87) Park River, North Dakota, U.S.
- Resting place: Park River Memorial Park
- Party: Republican

Roger Allin (December 18, 1848 – January 1, 1936) was an American politician who was the fourth governor of North Dakota from 1895 to 1897, and the second lieutenant governor of North Dakota from 1891 to 1893 serving under Governor Andrew H. Burke.

== Biography ==
Allin was a native of Bradworthy, Devonshire, England. After his father died, he and his family moved to Ontario, Canada, where he was educated in the public schools. He settled on a farm in Walsh County in 1880. He married twice, first to Isabella McKensie on March 22, 1881, then to Anna McKensie (niece of Isabella) on May 1, 1918. He had one child.

== Career ==
Allin served in the Dakota Territorial Council in 1887–1889 and as a delegate to the North Dakota 1889 Constitutional Convention. Allin was a member of the North Dakota Senate from 1889 through 1891; and then Lieutenant Governor as a Republican from 1891 through 1893. Elected by popular vote on November 6, 1894, he served as Governor through 1897. The effects of the Panic of 1893 were dealt with during his tenure. After losing a bid for reelection, he retired from politics and pursued his farming interests.

== Death ==
Allin died on January 1, 1936, and is interred at Park River Memorial Park, Park River, North Dakota.

== See also ==
- List of United States governors born outside the United States

Party political offices
Preceded by Andrew H. Burke	Republican nominee for Governor of North Dakota; 1894	Succeeded by Frank A. Briggs
Political offices
Preceded by Alfred Dickey	Lieutenant Governor of North Dakota; 1891–1893	Succeeded by Elmer D. Wallace
Preceded by Eli C. D. Shortridge	Governor of North Dakota; 1895–1897	Succeeded by Frank A. Briggs
