= Jesse O. Norton =

American politician

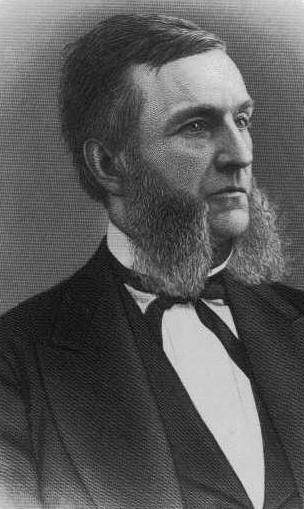

Member of the U.S. House of Representatives from Illinois's 6th district
- In office March 4, 1863 – March 3, 1865
- Preceded by: Anthony L. Knapp
- Succeeded by: Burton C. Cook

Member of the U.S. House of Representatives from Illinois's 3rd district
- In office March 4, 1853 – March 3, 1857
- Preceded by: Orlando B. Ficklin
- Succeeded by: Owen Lovejoy

Personal details
- Born: December 25, 1812 Bennington, Vermont
- Died: August 3, 1875 (aged 62) Chicago, Illinois
- Party: Republican

Jesse Olds Norton (December 25, 1812 – August 3, 1875) was a U.S. representative from Illinois.

== Biography ==
Born in Bennington, Vermont, Norton attended Bennington Academy and was graduated from Williams College, Williamstown, Massachusetts, in 1835. Norton was a charter member of Kappa Alpha Society and was awarded membership in Phi Beta Kappa. For four years he taught high school in Virginia and Missouri and then moved to Illinois where he studied law. He was admitted to the bar in 1840 and began practice in Joliet. Norton was a Probate Judge in 1846. He served as member of the state constitutional convention in 1847 and served as member of the Illinois House of Representatives in 1851 and 1852.

Norton was elected as a Whig to the Thirty-third Congress and reelected as a Republican candidate to the Thirty-fourth Congress (March 4, 1853 – March 3, 1857). He was not a candidate for renomination in 1856. He served as judge of the eleventh judicial district of Illinois 1857-1862.

Norton was elected as a Republican to the Thirty-eighth Congress (March 4, 1863 – March 3, 1865). He was not a candidate for renomination in 1864. He served as delegate to the Union National Convention at Philadelphia in 1866. He resumed the practice of his profession and was United States Attorney for Northern Illinois from 1866 to 1869. He died in Chicago, Illinois, August 3, 1875, and was interred in Oakwood Cemetery in Joliet.

U.S. House of Representatives
Preceded by Orlando B. Ficklin	Member of the U.S. House of Representatives from Illinois's 3rd congressional district 1853-1857	Succeeded by Owen Lovejoy
Preceded by Anthony L. Knapp	Member of the U.S. House of Representatives from Illinois's 6th congressional district 1863-1865	Succeeded by Burton C. Cook
