= Timothy R. Young =

American politician (1811–1898)

Member of the U.S. House of Representatives from Illinois's 3rd district
- In office March 4, 1849 – March 3, 1851
- Preceded by: Orlando B. Ficklin
- Succeeded by: Orlando B. Ficklin

Personal details
- Born: Timothy Roberts Young; November 19, 1811 Dover, New Hampshire, United States
- Died: May 12, 1898 (aged 86) Oilfield, Illinois
- Party: Democratic Party
- Spouse: Margarette E. Jones
- Children: Fanny Jones Young; Kimball Young; Ellen Swepson Young
- Education: Bowdoin College
- Profession: Attorney; Politician; Farmer

Timothy Roberts Young (November 19, 1811 – May 12, 1898) was an American attorney, farmer, and politician. He served as a U.S. representative from Illinois in the late 1840s and early 1850s.

== Early life and career ==
Born in Dover, New Hampshire, Young completed preparatory studies and attended Phillips Exeter Academy. He graduated from Bowdoin College in Brunswick, Maine in 1835. He studied law in Dover and was admitted to the bar in 1838. Young moved to Marshall, Illinois in the spring of 1838 and practiced law for ten years.

He was elected as a Democratic United States Representative to the Thirty-first Congress, serving the third district of Illinois. Young served from March 4, 1849, to March 3, 1851. He served on the House Committee on Public Lands.

After leaving Congress, he moved to Mattoon, Illinois, and became interested in the manufacture of plug tobacco, in which he worked for ten years as a wholesale tobacco merchant. He was involved in the railroad and engaged in agricultural pursuits near Casey, Illinois. He served a delegate to the Illinois state constitutional convention from Clark County in 1862.

== Personal life ==
Young married Margarette E. Jones in 1852. They had three children, Fanny Jones Young, Kimball Young, and Ellen Swepson Young.

== Death ==
Young died in Oilfield, Illinois, near Casey, Illinois, on May 12, 1898 (age 86 years, 174 days). He is interred in Marshall Cemetery in Marshall, Illinois.

U.S. House of Representatives
Preceded by Orlando B. Ficklin	Member of the U.S. House of Representatives from Illinois's 3rd congressional district 1849-1851	Succeeded by Orlando B. Ficklin
