= 1889 North Dakota gubernatorial election =

- October 1, 1889
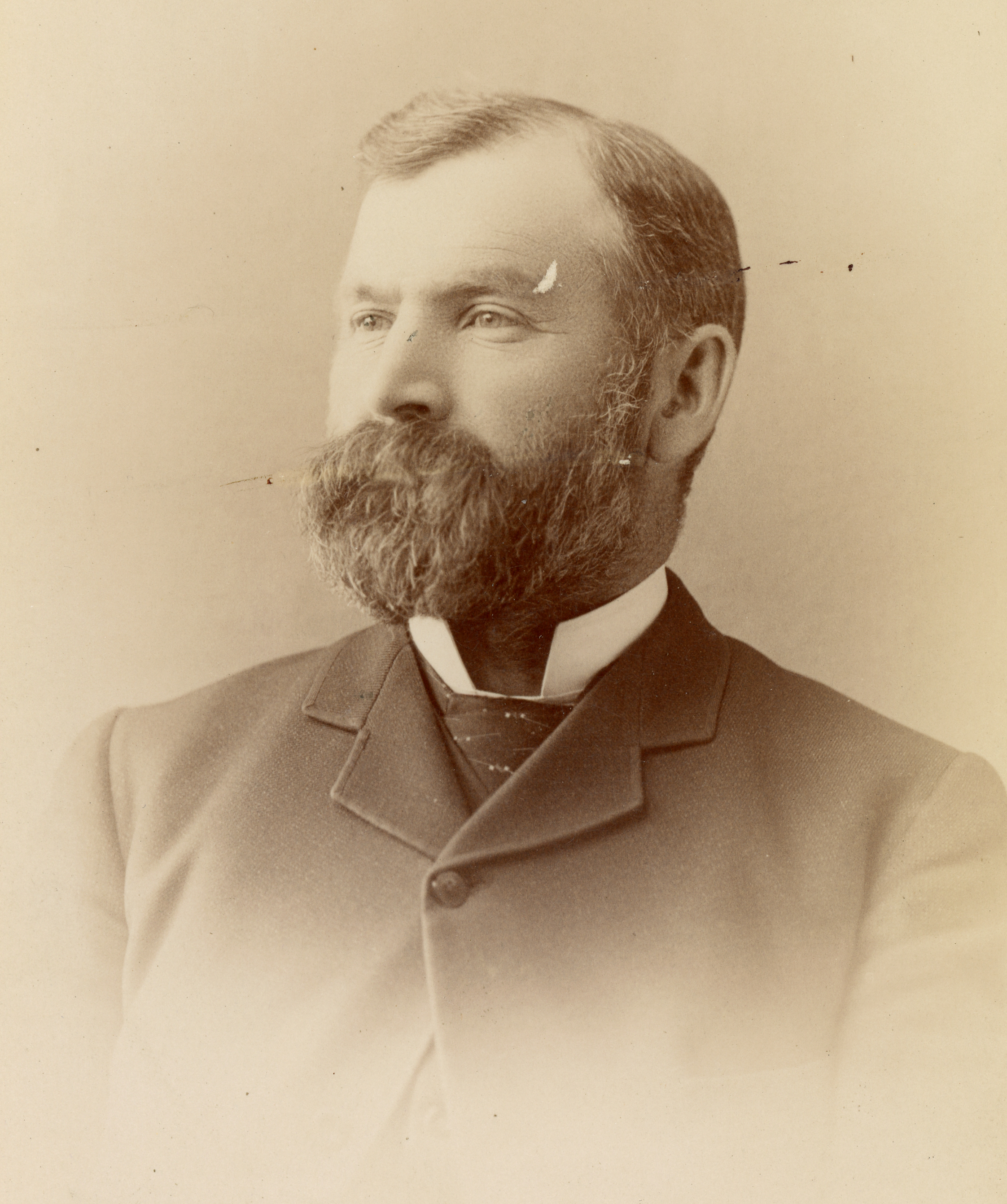

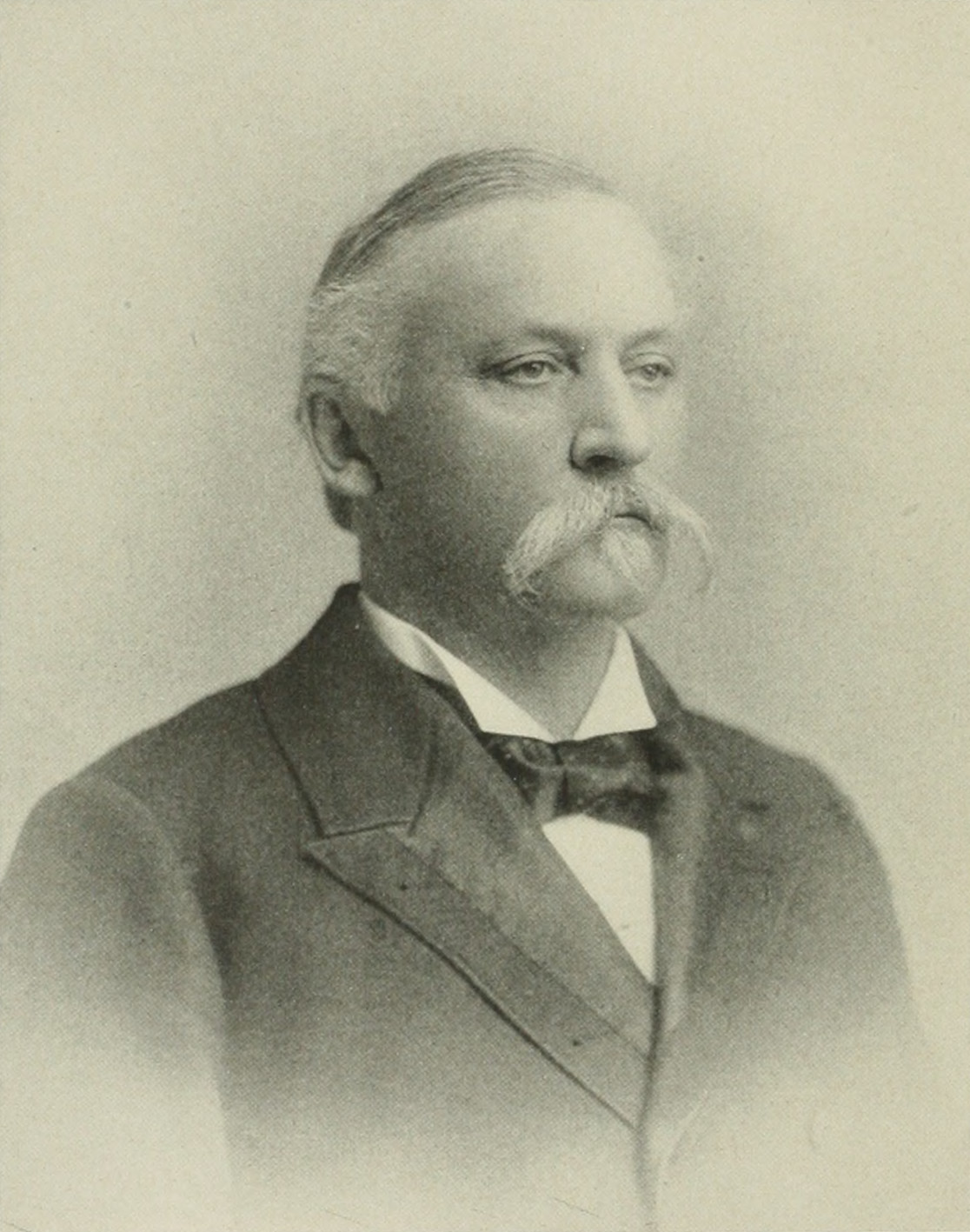
Nominee	John Miller	William N. Roach
Party	Republican	Democratic
Popular vote	25,365	12,733
Percentage	66.58%	33.42%
- County results Miller: 50–60% 60–70% 70–80% 80–90% 90–100% Roach: 50–60% 60–70% No Data/Vote
Elected Governor
John Miller
Republican

The 1889 North Dakota gubernatorial election was held on October 1, 1889. Republican nominee John Miller defeated Democratic nominee William N. Roach with 66.58% of the vote.

== General election ==
=== Candidates ===
- John Miller, bonanza farmer, member of the Dakota Territory Council (Republican)
- William N. Roach, member of the Territorial House of Representatives, (Democratic)

=== Results ===
1889 North Dakota gubernatorial election
Party	Candidate	Votes	%
Republican	John Miller	25,365	66.58%
Democratic	William N. Roach	12,733	33.42%
Majority		12,632	33.16%
Total votes		38,098	100.00
