= John James McDannold =

American politician

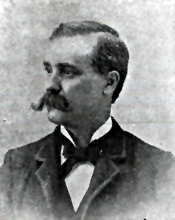

Member of the U.S. House of Representatives from Illinois's 12th district
- In office March 4, 1893 – March 3, 1895
- Preceded by: Scott Wike
- Succeeded by: Joseph Gurney Cannon

Personal details
- Born: August 29, 1851 Mount Sterling, Illinois
- Died: February 3, 1904 (aged 52) Chicago, Illinois
- Party: Democratic

John James McDannold (August 29, 1851 – February 3, 1904) was a Democrat and State court judge in Illinois in 1886. From 1893 to 1895, he was the U.S. representative from Illinois' 12th District.

== Biography ==
McDannold was born in Mount Sterling, Brown County, Illinois on August 29, 1851. McDannold attended public schools and a private school in Quincy, Illinois and graduated from the law department of the University of Iowa at Iowa City in June 1874. He was admitted to the bar of Illinois in September 1874 and commenced practice in Mount Sterling.

McDannold was appointed master in chancery for Brown County in October 1885. He was elected county judge of Brown County in 1886, and re-elected in November 1890; he served until October 2, 1892, when he resigned, having been nominated for the U.S. Congress.

McDannold was elected as a Democrat to the Fifty-third Congress (March 4, 1893 – March 3, 1895). He lost renomination in 1894.

He moved to Chicago, Illinois, in 1895 and resumed the practice of law. He died in Chicago on February 3, 1904. He was interred in City Cemetery, Mount Sterling, Illinois.

U.S. House of Representatives
Preceded by Scott Wike	Member of the U.S. House of Representatives from Illinois's 12th congressional district March 4, 1893 – March 3, 1895	Succeeded by Joseph G. Cannon
