= James M. Riggs =

American politician

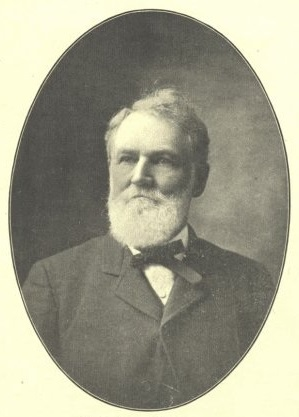
- From 1903's Standard Atlas of Scott County, Illinois

Member of the U.S. House of Representatives from Illinois's 12th district
- In office March 4, 1883 – March 3, 1887
- Preceded by: William McKendree Springer
- Succeeded by: George A. Anderson

Member of the Illinois House of Representatives
- In office 1871-1872

Personal details
- Born: April 17, 1839 Winchester, Illinois, U.S.
- Died: November 18, 1933 (aged 94) Winchester, Illinois, U.S.
- Party: Democratic

James Milton Riggs (April 17, 1839 – November 18, 1933) was a U.S. representative from Illinois, United States.

Born on a farm near Winchester, Illinois, Riggs attended the common schools and Eureka College (Illinois) in 1862 and 1863. He engaged in agricultural pursuits and taught school. Sheriff of Scott County from December 1, 1864, to December 1, 1866. He studied law. He was admitted to the bar December 28, 1867, and commenced practice in Winchester, Illinois. Secretary of the Winchester School Board 1868-1884 and served as president 1889-1892. (That district is now part of Winchester Community Unit School District 1.) He served as member of the Illinois House of Representatives in 1871 and 1872. State's attorney for Scott County 1872-1876. He served as mayor of Winchester in 1876 and 1877. He was elected as a Democrat to the Forty-eighth and Forty-ninth Congresses (March 4, 1883 – March 3, 1887). He was not a candidate for renomination in 1886. He resumed the practice of law in Winchester, Illinois. He served as president of the Illinois State Bar Association in 1891. He served as delegate to several State conventions. He was elected judge of Scott County in 1922. He was reelected in 1926 and served until 1930 when he retired from active pursuits. He died in Winchester, Illinois, November 18, 1933. He was interred in Winchester Cemetery.

U.S. House of Representatives
Preceded by William M. Springer	Member of the U.S. House of Representatives from Illinois's 12th congressional district 1883-1887	Succeeded by George A. Anderson
