= James W. Singleton =

American politician

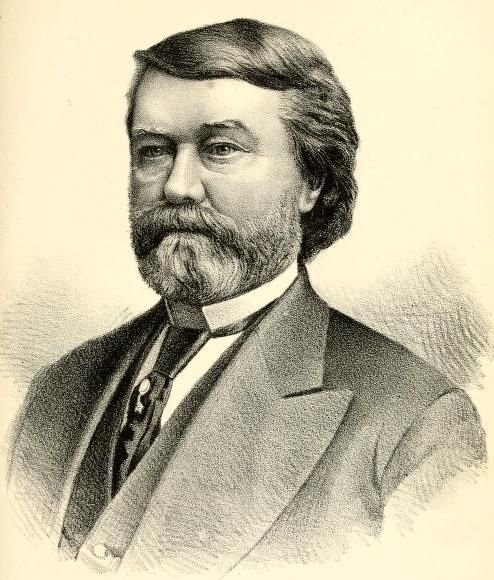

Member of the U.S. House of Representatives from Illinois's 11th district
- In office March 4, 1879 – March 3, 1883
- Preceded by: Robert M. Knapp
- Succeeded by: William H. Neece

Personal details
- Born: November 23, 1811 "Paxton," Frederick County, Virginia
- Died: April 4, 1892 (aged 80) Baltimore, Maryland
- Party: Democratic

James Washington Singleton (November 23, 1811 – April 4, 1892) was a U.S. representative from Illinois.

Born at "Paxton," his family's estate in Frederick County, Virginia, Singleton attended Winchester (Virginia) Academy. He moved to Mount Sterling, Illinois, in 1834. He studied medicine and practiced. He studied law. He was admitted to the bar in 1838 and commenced practice in Mount Sterling. He engaged in agricultural pursuits.

Singleton was elected brigadier general of the Illinois Militia in 1844 and took a conspicuous part in the so-called Mormon War. He served as delegate to the State constitutional conventions in 1847 and 1861. He served as member of the State house of representatives 1850–1854. He moved to Quincy, Illinois, in 1854. He was again a member of the State house of representatives in 1861. He was appointed in 1862 by Governor Yates as a member of the commission to confer with the British and Canadian authorities on the establishment of continuous water communication between the United States and Canada. He was an unsuccessful candidate for election in 1868 to the Forty-first Congress. Constructed the Quincy & Toledo and the Quincy, Alton & St. Louis Railroads and served as president of both companies.

Singleton was elected as a Democrat to the Forty-sixth and Forty-seventh Congresses (March 4, 1879 – March 3, 1883). He returned to his farm near Quincy, Illinois, and engaged in farming. He moved to Baltimore, Maryland, about 1891, and died there on April 4, 1892. He was interred in Mount Hebron Cemetery, Winchester, Virginia.

U.S. House of Representatives
Preceded by Robert M. Knapp	Member of the U.S. House of Representatives from Illinois's 10th congressional district 1879–1883	Succeeded by William Neece
