= Scott Wike =

American politician (1834–1901)

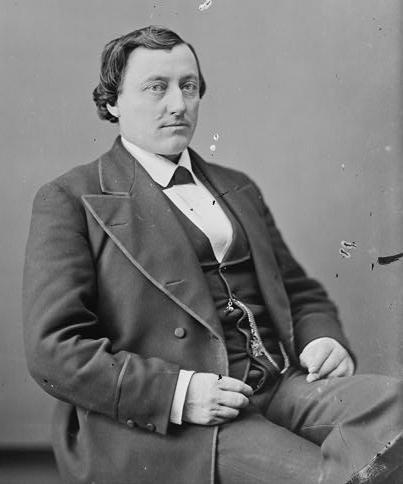

Member of the U.S. House of Representatives from Illinois's 12th district
- In office March 4, 1889 – March 3, 1893
- Preceded by: George A. Anderson
- Succeeded by: John James McDannold

Member of the U.S. House of Representatives from Illinois's 11th district
- In office March 4, 1875 – March 3, 1877
- Preceded by: Robert M. Knapp
- Succeeded by: Robert M. Knapp

Member of the Illinois House of Representatives
- In office 1863-1867

Personal details
- Born: April 6, 1834 Meadville, Pennsylvania, U.S.
- Died: January 15, 1901 (aged 66) Barry, Illinois, U.S.
- Party: Democratic

Scott Wike (April 6, 1834 – January 15, 1901) was a U.S. representative from Illinois.

Born in Meadville, Pennsylvania, Wike moved with his parents to Quincy, Illinois, in 1838 and to Pike County in 1844. He graduated from Lombard University in Galesburg in 1857. He studied law. He was admitted to the bar in 1858. Wike graduated from Harvard Law School in 1859 and commenced practice the same year in Pittsfield, Illinois. He served as member of the State house of representatives 1863-1867.

Wike was elected as a Democrat to the Forty-fourth Congress (March 4, 1875 – March 3, 1877). He was an unsuccessful candidate for renomination in 1876 to the Forty-fifth Congress.

Wike was elected to the Fifty-first and Fifty-second Congresses (March 4, 1889 – March 3, 1893). He was an unsuccessful candidate for renomination in 1892. He was appointed an Assistant Secretary of the Treasury during the second administration of President Cleveland and served from July 1, 1893, to May 4, 1897. He resumed the practice of law in Pittsfield, Illinois. He died near Barry, Illinois, on January 15, 1901.

U.S. House of Representatives
Preceded by Robert M. Knapp	Member of the U.S. House of Representatives from Illinois's 11th congressional district 1875–1877	Succeeded by Robert M. Knapp
Preceded by George A. Anderson	Member of the U.S. House of Representatives from Illinois's 12th congressional district 1889–1893	Succeeded by John J. McDannold
