= John Miller (North Dakota politician) =

American politician

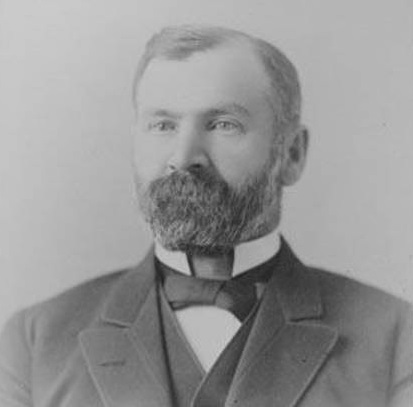

1st Governor of North Dakota
- In office November 20, 1889 – January 7, 1891
- Lieutenant: Alfred Dickey
- Preceded by: Arthur C. Mellette (as governor of Dakota Territory)
- Succeeded by: Andrew H. Burke

Personal details
- Born: October 29, 1843 Dryden, New York, U.S.
- Died: October 26, 1908 (aged 64) Duluth, Minnesota, U.S.
- Party: Republican
- Spouse: Addie S. Tucker

John Miller (October 29, 1843 – October 26, 1908) was a bonanza farmer, business man and American Republican politician in North Dakota. He served as the first governor of North Dakota from 1889 to 1891, after it was admitted as a state to the union.

Born of Scotch ancestors in the Finger Lakes region of New York state, Miller had moved to the Dakota Territory in 1878. With a partner he bought thousands of acres of land for what was called bonanza farming: large-scale farming of wheat as a commodity crop on an industrial scale. The Northern Pacific Railroad connected such farms to the populous eastern markets. He became a wealthy partner or owner of three major agricultural companies; the last also provided milling and other services.

== Biography ==
Miller was born in Dryden, New York, in 1843 in the Finger Lakes region. He became a farmer there. In the late 19th century, the government sold off large amounts of land at inexpensive prices in the Dakota Territory after extinguishing Native American claims, and Miller joined the thousands of people moving there. So many came from the Northern Tier of states that they established a political and social culture similar to that in New York, the Upper Midwest and New England.

In 1878, he moved to the Dakota Territory with Jeremy W. Dwight and purchased 17,000 acres (69 km²) of land in the fertile Red River Valley land of Richland County. As "bonanza farmers," the two men established the Dwight Farm and Land Company, selling some land as speculators. They became quite wealthy from cultivation of wheat as a commodity crop.

Miller married Addie S. Tucker on February 22, 1882. They had two daughters.

== Career ==
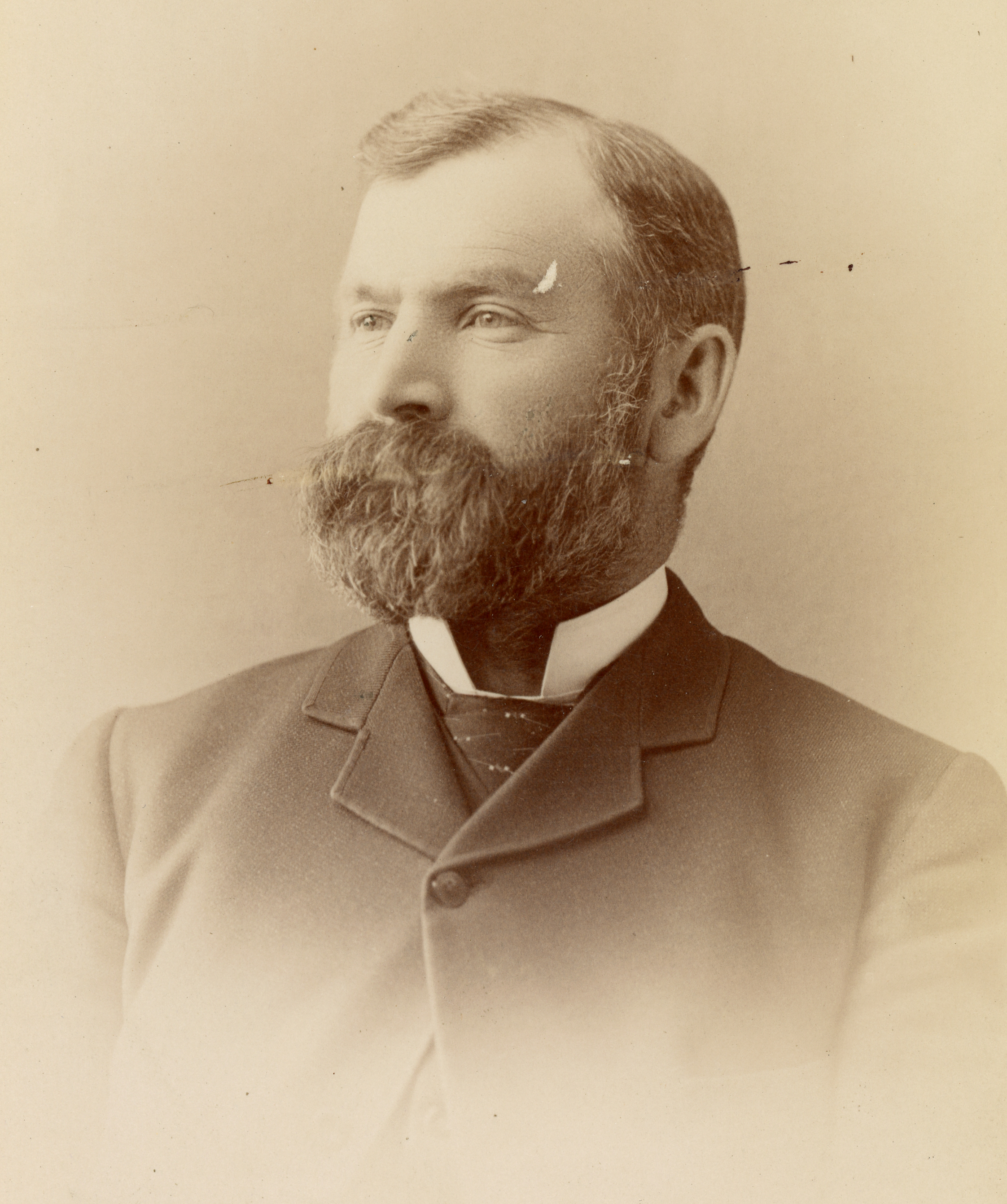
Portrait of North Dakota Governor John Miller, 1880s

In 1888 Miller was elected to the Dakota Territory Council, the territorial legislature. In 1889 Miller participated in the constitutional convention that resulted in North Dakota statehood. In 1889 he was the Republican nominee for Governor of North Dakota. He had no aspirations to the office, but North Dakota Republicans were convinced that he was the only candidate who could unite the party – Miller had developed a reputation for honesty by resisting lobbyists and others who attempted to obtain favorable action from the Council through bribery and other corrupt means. Persuaded that if he did not run the Republicans would lose, Miller agreed to become a candidate.

He won by popular vote in the General Election in 1889. In 1890, the state had a total white population of 190,983, having increased from 2,405 in the territory in 1870.

During Miller's two-year tenure, the state government was formed. After serving his term, Miller declined to run again for re-election or other political office.

He returned to his bonanza farm business, raising wheat and grain on an industrial scale. He organized the John Miller Land Company in 1896.

In 1906 Miller became president of the newly incorporated Chaffee-Miller Milling Company. His partner Herbert F. Chaffee and he arranged for milling flour, and supplied feed and other agricultural services. The company had offices in North Dakota and Duluth, Minnesota. Miller died in 1908.

== Death ==
Miller died in Duluth, Minnesota in 1908. His family accompanied his body as it was returned to his birthplace of Dryden, New York. He was buried in Green Hills Cemetery. In 1910 a granite mausoleum was erected at his gravesite, and his remains were reinterred in it. Miller's wife and two daughters were also later buried here. In 2014 the mausoleum was restored and a plaque was added with Miller's name and title; a United States flag was installed nearby.

Party political offices
First	Republican nominee for Governor of North Dakota; 1889	Succeeded by Andrew H. Burke
Political offices
Preceded by Governors of Dakota Territory	Governor of North Dakota; 1889–1891	Succeeded by Andrew H. Burke
