= Benjamin T. Cable =

American politician

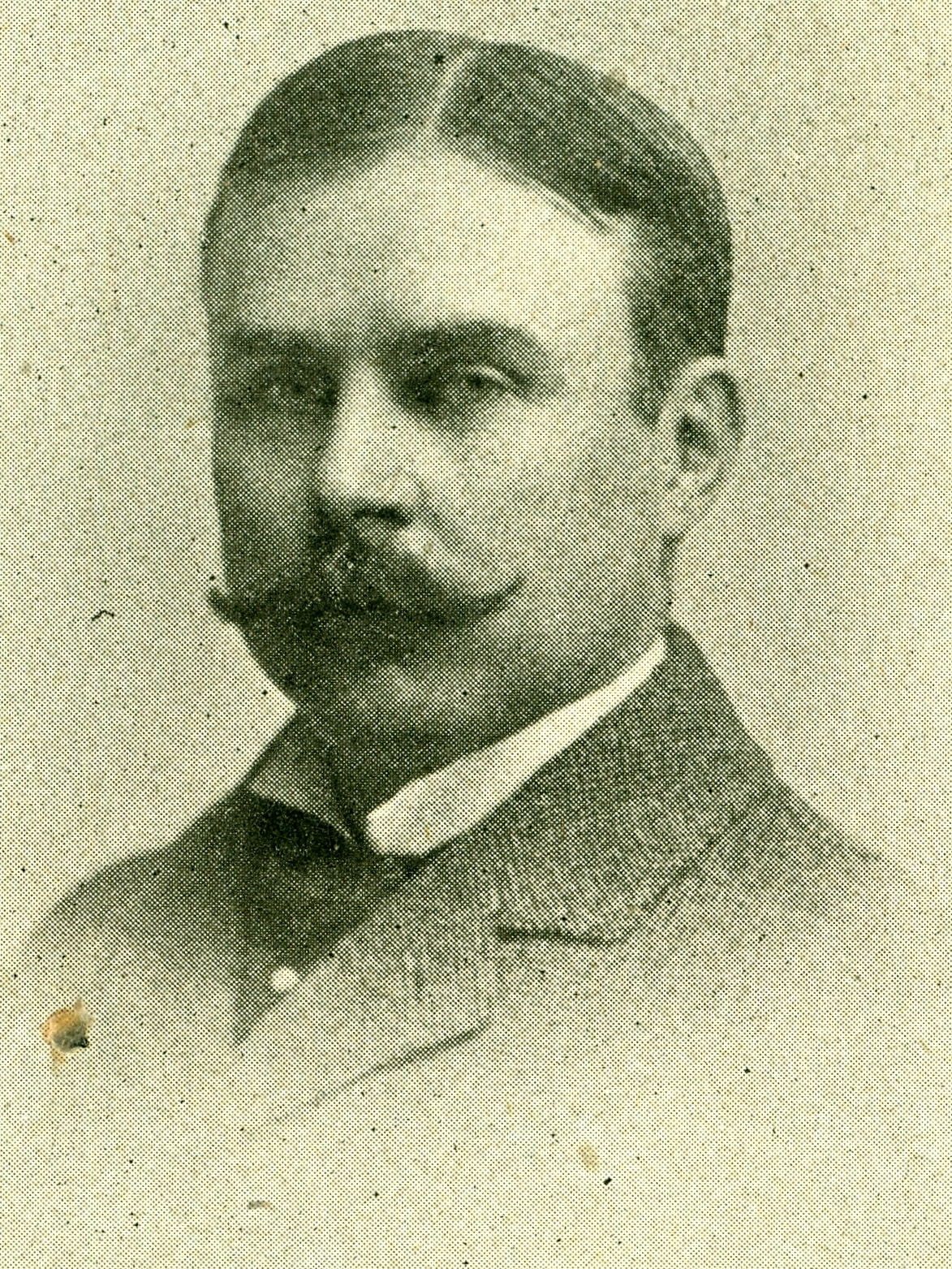

Member of the U.S. House of Representatives from Illinois's 11th district
- In office March 4, 1891 – March 3, 1893
- Preceded by: William H. Gest
- Succeeded by: Benjamin F. Marsh

Personal details
- Born: Benjamin Taylor Cable; August 11, 1853 Georgetown, Kentucky
- Died: December 13, 1923 (aged 70) Rock Island, Illinois
- Resting place: Chippiannock Cemetery
- Party: Democratic

Benjamin Taylor Cable (August 11, 1853 – December 13, 1923) was an American businessman and politician who served one term as a U.S. representative from Illinois from 1891 to 1893.

== Life ==
Born in Georgetown, Kentucky, Cable moved with his parents to Rock Island, Illinois, in September 1856. He attended the public schools and Racine College (now University of Wisconsin–Parkside), Racine, Wisconsin. He was graduated from the University of Michigan at Ann Arbor in 1876.

=== Business career ===
He engaged in agricultural pursuits and also became interested in various manufacturing enterprises.

=== Political career ===
He served as chairman of the western branch of the Democratic National Committee in 1892. He was chairman of the Democratic executive committee in 1902 and served as a delegate to the Democratic National Convention in 1904.

Cable was elected as a Democrat to the Fifty-second Congress (March 4, 1891 – March 3, 1893). He declined to be a candidate for renomination in 1892.

=== Later career and death ===
He engaged in agricultural pursuits as joint owner of a ranch near San Antonio, Texas.

He died in Rock Island, Illinois, on December 13, 1923. He was interred in Chippiannock Cemetery.

U.S. House of Representatives
Preceded by William Gest	Member of the U.S. House of Representatives from Illinois's 10th congressional district 1891–1893	Succeeded by Benjamin F. Marsh
