= Andrew H. Burke =

American politician (1850–1918)

Andrew Horace Burke
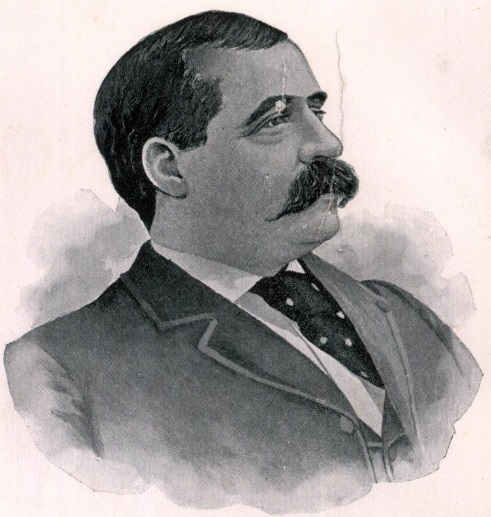
- From the 1897 atlas North Dakota and Richland County Chart

2nd Governor of North Dakota
- In office January 7, 1891 – January 3, 1893
- Lieutenant: Roger Allin
- Preceded by: John Miller
- Succeeded by: Eli C. D. Shortridge

Personal details
- Born: May 15, 1850 New York City, U.S.
- Died: November 17, 1918 (aged 68) Roswell, New Mexico, U.S.
- Party: Republican
- Spouse: Caroline Cleveland
- Education: DePauw University
- Profession: Politician

Andrew Horace Burke (May 15, 1850 – November 17, 1918) was an American politician who was the second governor of North Dakota from 1891 to 1893.

== Biography ==
Burke was born in New York City in 1850. His mother died at his birth and his father died when Burke was four years old. He then became a ward of the Children's Aid Society. As a boy, Burke sold newspapers in the city before he was adopted in 1858 by a family of farmers near Noblesville, Indiana. He enlisted as a drummer boy at the age of 12 with an Indiana regiment on July 17, 1862, in the American Civil War. After returning to Indiana, he finished his education, attending what would become DePauw University for two years. In 1880, after marrying Caroline Cleveland, he moved to Casselton, North Dakota and became a general store bookkeeper.

== Career ==
He next became a cashier of the First National Bank of Casselton and then, for six years, the Treasurer of Cass County.

Burke was elected to the governorship in 1890 as a Republican. During Burke's administration, it was discovered that North Dakota did not have any laws for the selection of presidential electors. Burke called for a special session of the legislature to convene on June 1, 1891, and attended to the law. The state participated in the 1892 U.S. presidential election, when Grover Cleveland was elected to a second term as President of the United States. (Based on the popular vote in North Dakota – narrowly won by Populist candidate James Weaver – one Republican elector and two electors from a fusion Democratic-Populist slate were selected. The Republican elector voted for the Republican candidate, incumbent President Benjamin Harrison, while other two electors split, one voting for Cleveland and one voting for Weaver.)

Burke's political career ended when he lost the support of the state's farmers by vetoing a bill that would have forced railroads to lease sites near the tracks for building grain elevators and warehouses under terms that were unacceptable to the railroads. He returned to private life and after an unsuccessful stint in the grain business in Minnesota, he became an inspector with the United States General Land Office, subsequently living in Washington, DC; Colorado; and New Mexico.

== Death ==
Burke died in Roswell, New Mexico on November 17, 1918. His remains are interred in South Park Cemetery in Roswell.

Party political offices
Preceded by John Miller	Republican nominee for Governor of North Dakota; 1890, 1892	Succeeded by Roger Allin
Political offices
Preceded by John Miller	Governor of North Dakota; 1891–1893	Succeeded by Eli C. D. Shortridge
