= Lyman R. Casey =

American politician (1837–1914)

Lyman Rufus Casey
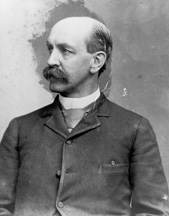

United States Senator from North Dakota
- In office November 25, 1889 – March 4, 1893
- Preceded by: (none)
- Succeeded by: William N. Roach

Personal details
- Born: May 6, 1837 York, New York, U.S.
- Died: January 26, 1914 (aged 76) Washington, D.C., U.S.
- Resting place: Green Mount Cemetery; Baltimore, Maryland, U.S.
- Party: Republican
- Spouse: Harriett Mary Platt (m. 1861)
- Children: 3

Lyman Rufus Casey Jr. (May 6, 1837 – January 26, 1914) was an American politician from North Dakota. He moved to the Dakota Territory from New York in 1882 and worked in ranching and real estate. He was one of the first two senators to represent North Dakota in the U.S. Senate, serving from 1889 to 1893.

== Early life ==
Lyman Rufus Casey was born on May 6, 1837, in York, New York.In 1853, Casey moved with his parents to Ypsilanti, Michigan, and was raised and attended school there.

== Career ==
Casey engaged in the hardware business for many years. He worked for Pratt & Company. He also worked for the Buffalo branch of L. B. Pratt of Baltimore. He moved to Detroit. In 1882, he moved to Carrington, Foster County, Territory of Dakota, and became a rancher. He organized the Carrington-Casey Land Company. He was chairman of the North Dakota Committee on Irrigation and was commissioner of Foster County in 1887.

Upon the admission of North Dakota as a state into the Union, Casey was elected as a Republican to the U.S. Senate and served from November 25, 1889, to March 4, 1893. He was an unsuccessful candidate for renomination in 1892. While in the Senate, he was chairman of the railroads committee (Fifty-second Congress). He moved to New York City and later to Washington, D.C.

== Personal life ==
In 1861, Casey married Harriett Mary Platt. One of her siblings was Jane Platt, wife of the drinking straw inventor Marvin C. Stone. The couple had two sons and a daughter, Frank, Carl, and Mrs. Atwood Topliff. He was affiliated with the Lafayette Presbyterian Church. He lived in Jamestown, North Dakota, until around 1908 or 1909.

Casey died at his apartment at Westmoreland in Washington, D.C. on January 25, 1914. He was buried at Green Mount Cemetery in Baltimore, Maryland.

U.S. Senate
Preceded by None	U.S. senator (Class 1) from North Dakota; 1889–1893; Served alongside: Gilbert A. Pierce, Henry C. Hansbrough	Succeeded by William N. Roach
