= North Dakota Democratic-Independent Party =

- Founded: 1891
- Dissolved: 1894
- Ideology: Progressivism
- Political position: Left-wing
- National affiliation: Democratic Party

The North Dakota Democratic-Independent Party, abbreviated D-I, was a progressive political party that formed around 1890 in response to the North Dakota Republican Party's domination of state politics.

== History ==
The party's roots can be traced back to 1890 when the Farmer's Alliance created an Independent Party aimed at overthrowing the Republican party. The state's Democratic Party at the time was very weak, so the two parties merged in 1891, and in 1892 the joint Democratic-Independent party was able to gain control of all of the state's constitutional offices except for that of the North Dakota Secretary of State. One of the party's newly elected officers was Laura J. Eisenhuth, North Dakota Superintendent of Public Instruction, who became the first woman elected to a statewide office in the United States. The success of the D-I party was very short-lived, however; the Republican Party regained control of all lost offices in 1894, and the party quickly dissolved.

A half century later, North Dakota Democrats merged with the progressive Nonpartisan League to form the North Dakota Democratic–Nonpartisan League Party in a more successful and long-lasting arrangement.

== See also ==
- Politics of North Dakota
- Political party strength in North Dakota
