= Timeline of South Dakota =

This timeline of South Dakota is a list of events in the history of South Dakota by year.

== First people ==
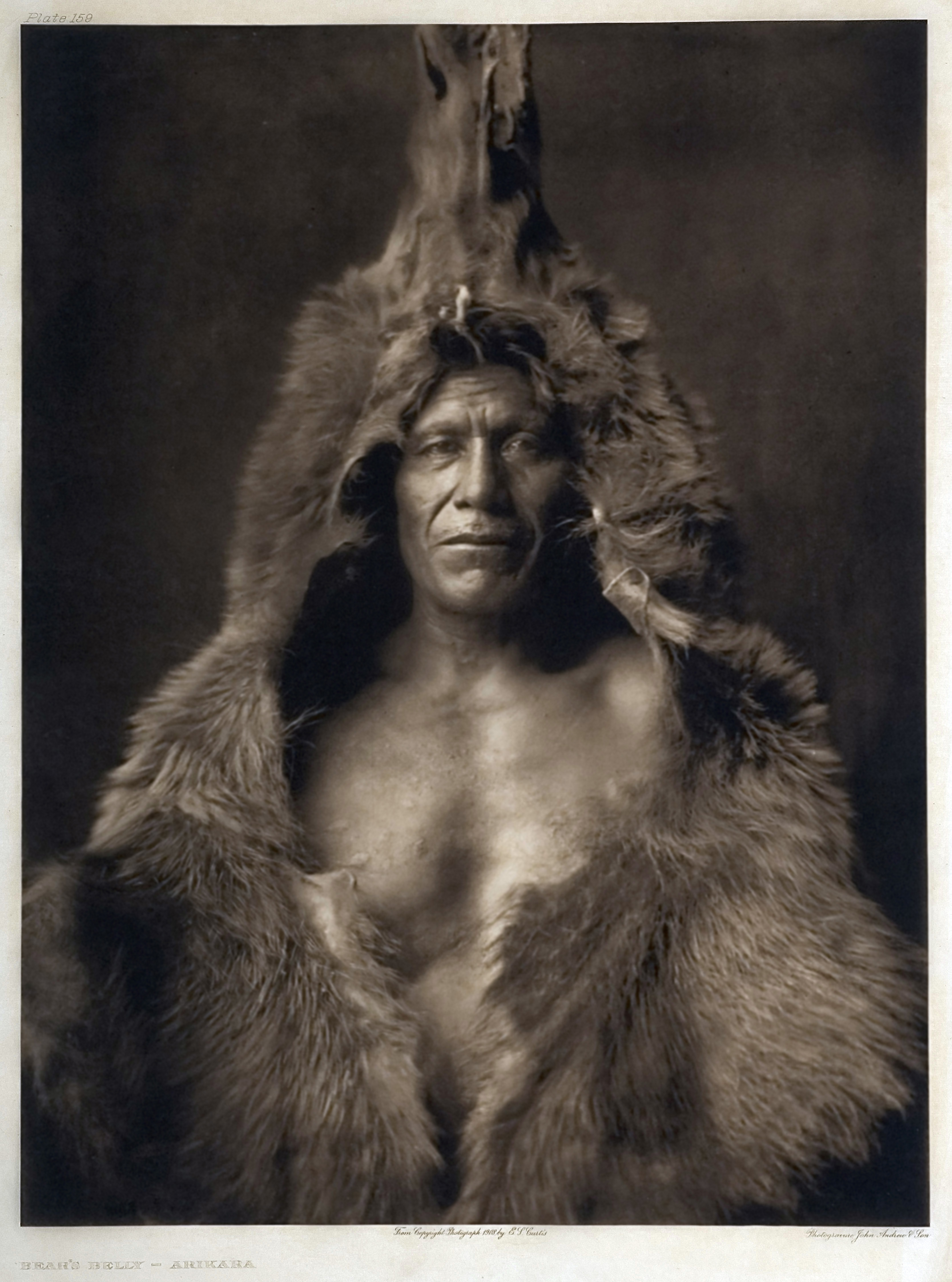
Arikara man, wearing a bearskin, 1908

- Paleo-Indians settle the Americas.
- List of archaeological periods (North America)
- Before 11000 BCE: Clovis culture
- Before 8000 BCE: Folsom tradition
- Circa 5000 BCE: Plains Archaic period begins with drier climate.
- Beginning 35th century BCE: Mound Builders begin living in eastern South Dakota, encompassing the Archaic, Woodland, and Mississippian cultures:
  - 11th century BCE: The Woodland period begins in eastern South Dakota: the period between hunter-gatherers and agriculture that includes innovation in pottery, textiles, and tools. Climate improves to its modern state. Trade with farther cultures is common.
  - 11th century: Agriculture begins with the Mississippian culture.
  - 1325: More than 450 people were massacred at a Crow Creek village.
  - 15th century: Arikara and other Plains Village people arrive and live along the Missouri River valley.

== 16th century ==
- In the pre-colonial time before the Europeans arrived, there were hunter-gatherer peoples west of the Missouri River, Woodland culture along the eastern lakes, and Plains Villages and Oneota cultures all in what is now South Dakota. The western cultures are now known as the Crow Nation and Cheyenne. The Plains Villagers are now known as Mandans, Arikaras, and Hidatsas. The easternmost tribes are now known as Omahas, Poncas, and Dakotas.

== 17th century ==
- Sioux people arrive.

1670-1707

- South Dakota land is part of the English territory of Rupert's Land.

1683

- French explorer and fur trader Pierre-Charles Le Sueur probably visited Sioux Falls to buy furs which he shipped by flatboat to the mouth of the Mississippi River.

1699-1764

- South Dakota land is part of the French colony of La Louisiane.

== 18th century ==
1700

- Le Sueur's traders from Fort L'Huillier (Mankato, Minnesota) traded on Big Sioux River at Flandreau and Sioux Falls.

1743

- Verendrye brothers visited western part of South Dakota and claimed soil for French king. Planted lead plate inscribed with arms of France near Pierre.

1745

- De Lusigan visited Big Stone Lake to call in unlicensed traders.

1750

- Teton Sioux at about this date, having driven Omahas from Big Sioux and James river valleys, reached Missouri River and engaged Arikara (Rees) in forty years' war.

1762

- The Treaty of Fontainebleau cedes the French colony of La Louisiane, including South Dakota land, to Spain.

1764-1803

- South Dakota land is part of the Spanish (though predominantly Francophone) district of Alta Luisiana.

1775

- Oglala Tetons discover Black Hills and soon afterward drive Kiowas from that region.

1780

- Yankton and Yanktonais Sioux, about this date, having been driven from western Iowa by Ottos, came up and settled in James River valley.

1785

- Pierre Dorion, afterward guide to Lewis and Clark, married a Yankton woman and settled in trade at mouth of James River.

1790

- Pierre Garreau settled with Rees at mouth of Grand River.

1792

- Sioux finally conquer Rees and drive them from their strong position in neighborhood of Pierre. The Rees retreat up river and settle with relatives at mouth of Grand River.

1796

- Loisel, or L'Oiselle, builds post on Cedar Island, between Pierre and Big Bend. First recorded post in South Dakota.

1797

- Trudeau builds "Pawnee House" on east side of the Missouri, opposite Fort Randall, in Charles Mix County.

== 19th century ==
1800

- Third Treaty of San Ildefonso led to the return of the Louisiana Territory to France.

1803

- French district of Haute-Louisiane.
- Unorganized U.S. territory created by the Louisiana Purchase.

1804

- Lewis and Clark explore Missouri valley through South Dakota, en route to Pacific.
- District of Louisiana, 1804–1805

1805

- Pierre Dorion conducts party of Sioux chiefs to St. Louis.
- Territory of Louisiana, 1805–1812

1806

- Lewis and Clark return from Pacific passing through South Dakota.

1807

Manuel Lisa

- Manuel Lisa undertakes trade with Indians at head of Missouri. Sergeant Nathaniel Pryor attempts to conduct Big White, a Mandan chief who visited Washington with Lewis and Clark, to his home and is attacked and driven back by Rees, assisted by Minneconjou Teton Sioux under Black Buffalo. Four whites killed, nine wounded.

1808

- St. Louis Missouri Fur Company organized for trade on Upper Missouri. Established post in Loisel house on Cedar Island.

1809

- Manuel Lisa, for St Louis Missouri Fur Company, safely conducts Big White to his home in North Dakota. Finds Rees friendly.

1810

- Loisel post burned with large stock of furs.

1811

- Astorian party go up Missouri to Grand River where they buy horses of Rees and go thence up Grand River toward Pacific. First recorded exploration of northern Black Hills region.
- Manuel Lisa finds Sioux excited over "Prophet craze" and believes it due to hostile English influence. Reports condition to General Clark, Indian agent.

1812

- Red Thunder, Flathead Yanktonais chief from Elm River, Brown County, with son, Waneta, and twenty-two Sissetons enlist to serve English in war against Americans.
- Territory of Missouri, 1812–1821.

1813

- Manuel Lisa made subagent for Missouri River Sioux and keeps them friendly to American interests.

1815

- Teton Sioux sign treaty of friendship at Portage des Sioux. Black Buffalo dies there July 14. Given military funeral.

1816

- Pawnee House burns.

1817

- Fur trade revives. Joseph La Framboise builds Fort Teton at site of Fort Pierre. First continuous settlement.

1818

- Anglo-American Convention.

1822

- La Framboise builds trading post at Great Bend of Big Sioux (Flandreau).
- Fort Tecumseh built at site of Fort Pierre by Columbia Fur Company.
- Fort Recovery built upon American Island at Chamberlain by Missouri Fur Company. (It is possible this post was built ten years earlier to compensate loss of Loisel post, and was headquarters of Manuel Lisa during War of 1812–1815.)

1823

- General Ashley, lieutenant governor of Missouri, en route to Yellowstone, with cargo of goods and one hundred men, attacked by Rees at Grand River and thirteen men killed and ten severely wounded.
- Colonel Henry Leavenworth, with 220 men, marches from Fort Atkinson, near Omaha, to punish Rees for attack on Atkinson. At Yankton, July 3, Sergeant Samuel Stackpole and six men drowned by overturning of boat. Leavenworth is joined by Joshua Pilcher, manager of Missouri Fur Company, with forty volunteers at Fort Recovery. General Ashley and eighty men join party at Cheyenne River. Seven hundred and fifty Sioux Indians volunteer for the campaign. August 9 Ree towns reached and besieged. Rees punished and beg for terms. First general military movement in Dakota.

1825

- General Henry Atkinson and Benjamin O'Fallon sent up Missouri with an escort of 476 men to make treaties for trade and intercourse with Indian tribes. Very successful. Destroy English influence with Indians. First Fourth of July celebration in Dakota.
- Wamdesapa, a Wakpekuta chief, kills his brother Tasagi and is driven from his tribe. Settles on Vermilion River in South Dakota.

1828

- American Fur Company absorbs Columbia Fur Company and becomes dominant in Dakota trade.

1831

- Pierre Chouteau, Jr., navigates first steamboat, the Yellowstone, on upper Missouri, reaching Fort Tecumseh. Revolutionizes fur trade methods.

1832

- Fort Pierre built to succeed Fort Tecumseh.
- George Catlin, famous painter of Indian pictures, visits Fort Pierre and paints many likenesses.
- Frederick Le Beau, a trader, kills Francois Querrel, an employee, at mouth of Cherry Creek, on Cheyenne River. Le Beau arrested by order of William Laidlaw, burgeois of Fort Pierre, and sent to St. Louis in chains.

1837

- Great smallpox epidemic on Missouri River. All tribes suffer severely. Mandans practically destroyed.

1838

- Dr. Joseph N. Nicollet, accompanied by John C. Frémont, visits the coteau region of eastern South Dakota, mapping and naming the lakes.

1839

- Nicollet and Fremont again visit South Dakota, coming up the river to Fort Pierre, thence passing over to James River, and finally to the Minnesota.
- Father Pierre John De Smet visits the renegade band of Wakpekuta Sioux under Wamdesapa, to try to effect a peace between them and the Potawatomies of central Iowa.

1840

- Dr. Stephen R. Riggs, celebrated missionary from Minnesota River, visits Fort Pierre and preaches first Christian sermon in Dakota.

1842

- Audubon, the naturalist, visited the section upon a professional trip and observed and noted most of the birds and animals.
- Father Alexander Ravoux visits Fort Pierre and baptizes many Indians.

1845

- Father Ravoux visits Fort Vermilion.

1847

- Mrs. Joseph La Barge comes to Fort Pierre, with her husband, Captain La Barge of the steamboat Martha. First white woman to visit South Dakota. The Martha attacked by Yankton Indians at Crow Creek.

1849

- Inkpaduta, son of the renegade Wamdesapa, massacres his cousin Wamundiyakapi and seventeen other Wakpekutas.

1851

- Father De Smet visits the Teton Sioux.
- Santee Sioux relinquish title to all land east of Big Sioux River by treaty of Traverse des Sioux. This was the first Euro-American settlement of the land to become South Dakota.
- Treaty of Fort Laramie of 1851.

1855

- Government buys Fort Pierre. General William S. Harney, after battle of Ash Hollow, in Nebraska, brings army of twelve hundred men to Pierre. Lieutenant Gouverneur K. Warren, afterward famous in Civil War, examines and makes topographical survey of much of South Dakota.

1856

- Fort Randall established by General William S. Harney.

1857

- Settlement begun at Sioux Falls, Flandreau, and Medary. "The Noble Road" built across the state from Lake Benton to Crow Creek.
- Fort Randall completed and occupied.
- Inkpaduta, the renegade, massacres forty-two settlers at Spirit Lake, Iowa, and retreats into South Dakota with three white women captives.

1858

- Yankton Sioux make treaty relinquishing title to lands between Big Sioux and Missouri. Yankton Indian Reservation established. This was the second treaty with the Sioux within seven years to open land to Euro-American settlement, and the land became known as the Yankton Triangle.
- Mrs. Goodwin, first white woman settler, arrives at Sioux Falls.
- Settlement at Medary destroyed by Smutty Bear, Yankton Sioux.
- Settlers at Sioux Falls build and fortify Fort Sod.
- Provisional government organized. Legislature elected and convened. Alpheus G. Fuller sent as delegate to Congress. Henry Masters, governor.

1859

- Yankton treaty ratified. July 10 Indians surrender lands. Yankton, Vermilion, and Bon Homme founded.
- Dakota Democrat newspaper established by Samuel J. Albright. Governor Masters dies. New legislature elected at Sioux Falls. Jefferson P. Kidder elected delegate to Congress. Wilmot W. Brookings provisional governor.

1860

- First church society organized at Vermilion by Presbyterians.
- First school opened at Vermilion.
- First schoolhouse built at Bon Homme.
- Non-Native population was approximately 1100 people, mostly in trading posts or military garrisons along the rivers.

1861

- Dakota Territory erected by Congress March 2. Dr. William Jayne appointed governor. Establishes temporary capital at Yankton. Calls election for legislature and delegate to Congress. John B.S. Todd elected delegate.
- Dakota in the American Civil War

1862

- First territorial legislature, the "Pony Congress", meets March 17. They chartered the Missouri and Niobrara Valley Railroad Company, a planned but never completed railway.
- Company A, Dakota cavalry, organized at Yankton.
- South Dakota State Historical Society founded May 7, 1862.
- Great Indian Outbreak in Minnesota, August 18. The Amidons massacred at Sioux Falls. Settlers flee in wild panic. Stockade at Yankton. All men called to arms.
- Crow Creek Reservation established.
- The Homestead Act of 1862 provides ownership of South Dakota land to people who farm it for several years.

1863

- Governor Jayne goes to Congress. Newton Edmunds appointed governor. Company B, Dakota cavalry, organized at Elkpoint.

1864

- Standing Rock Sioux Reservation established.

1865

- War of Outbreak ended by treaty at Fort Pierre. Montana road ordered built.

1866

- Red Cloud war begins.
- Andrew J. Faulk succeeds Newton Edmunds.
- Great affliction of grasshoppers. Crops eaten up.

1868

- Red Cloud war ends. Great Sioux reservation created by treaty.
- Treaty of Fort Laramie of 1868

1869

- Faulk succeeded by John A. Burbank. "Wild and woolly period." Great factional Moody-Brookings fight begins.

1870

- Population of Dakota Territory below the 46th parallel north (the modern extent of South Dakota) is 11,776 and growing.

1872

- First railroad in South Dakota; Dakota Southern built from Sioux City to Yankton.

1873

- A land-grant railroad from New Ulm, Minnesota, to Lake Kampeska near Watertown is finished. Named the Winona & St. Peter Railroad, this subsidiary of the Chicago and North Western built about 34.5 miles (55.5 km) of track in Dakota Territory. But lack of population meant that trains only ran to Gary on the Minnesota-Dakota border until population increase after 1878.
- Gen. Edwin S. McCook, secretary of Dakota Territory, shot and killed by Peter P. Wintermute, result of factional political fight.

1874

- Burbank succeeded by John L. Pennington.
- Gold discovered in Black Hills. General Custer's expedition to the Black Hills.
- Second invasion of grasshoppers.

1875

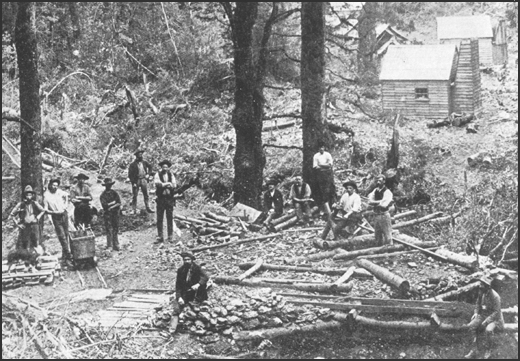
Miners in the Black Hills

- Black Hills treaty commission fails. Rush of miners to Custer.

1876

- Gold discovered in Deadwood Gulch. Stampede from Custer. Miners establish law and order. The Homestake deposit is discovered in Lead; it becomes the largest and deepest gold mine in North America.
- Great Sioux war. Battles of Rosebud and Little Big Horn. Custer's army destroyed.
- Black Hills War, 1876–1877
- Black Hills relinquished by Indians. All agency Sioux dismounted and disarmed.

1877

- Great Dakota boom begins.

1878

- William A. Howard succeeds Pennington.

1879

- Great boom waxes strong. Railroad building begins.

1880

- Chicago and Northwestern Railroad builds to Pierre; the Milwaukee reaches Chamberlain.
- Great October blizzard: subject of Laura Ingalls Wilder's The Long Winter.
- Governor Howard dies and is succeeded by Nehemiah G. Ordway.

1881

- Awful floods on Big Sioux and Missouri.
- Spotted Tail, noted Brule Sioux, killed by jealous warrior.
- Yankton College established by Dr. Joseph Ward.
- Springfield Normal organized and supported with local donations rather than tax monies

1882

- Capital removed from Yankton to Bismarck.
- State University established.
- Turtle Mountain Indian Reservation established.

1883

- Division and admission movement earnestly prosecuted to save school lands. First Sioux Falls constitutional convention.
- Presbyterian University opened at Pierre. Removed to Huron as Huron College, 1899.
- Sioux Falls College founded.
- Agricultural College founded at Brookings.
- Madison Normal School founded.

1884

- Ordway succeeded by Gilbert A. Pierce.
- Redfield College founded.
- All Saints School for Young Ladies founded at Sioux Falls.

1885

- Second Sioux Falls constitutional convention. State officers and United States senators elected. Huron temporary capital.
- Spearfish Normal organized.
- Dakota Wesleyan University established at Mitchell.

1887

- Pierce succeeded by Louis K. Church.
- School of Mines founded at Rapid City.

1889

- Enabling Act of the United States Congress provides for division and admission of South and North Dakota on November 2.
- Arthur C. Mellette succeeds Church.
- Third Sioux Falls constitutional convention.
- Lutheran Normal School founded at Sioux Falls.
- Augustana College founded at Canton.
- Pine Ridge, Cheyenne River, Lower Brule, and Rosebud (Upper Brule) Indian Reservations created from Great Sioux Reservation. Lake Traverse (Sisseton) Reservation established.

1890

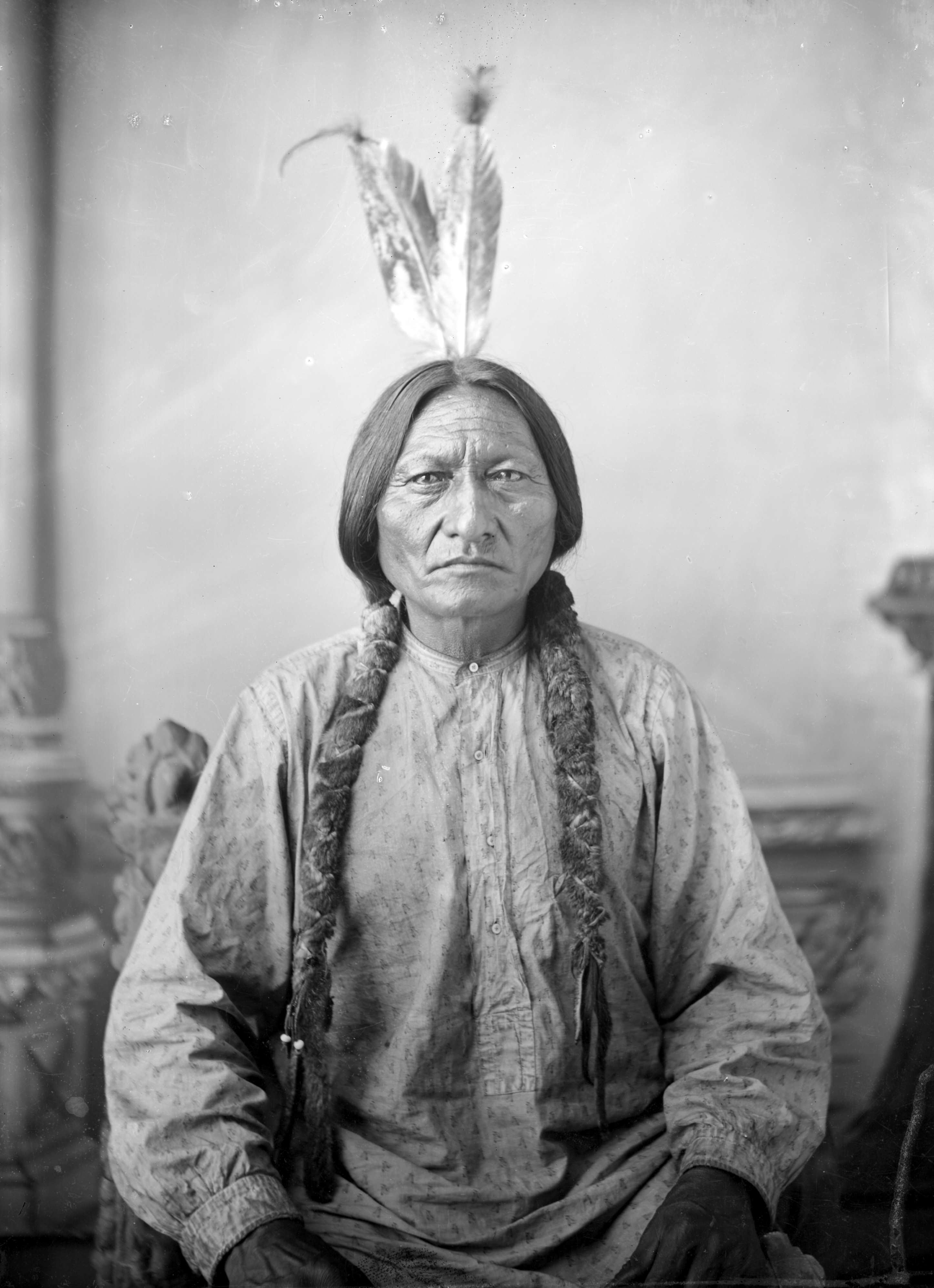
Sitting Bull, a Hunkpapa Lakota leader, was one of the principal Sioux leaders.

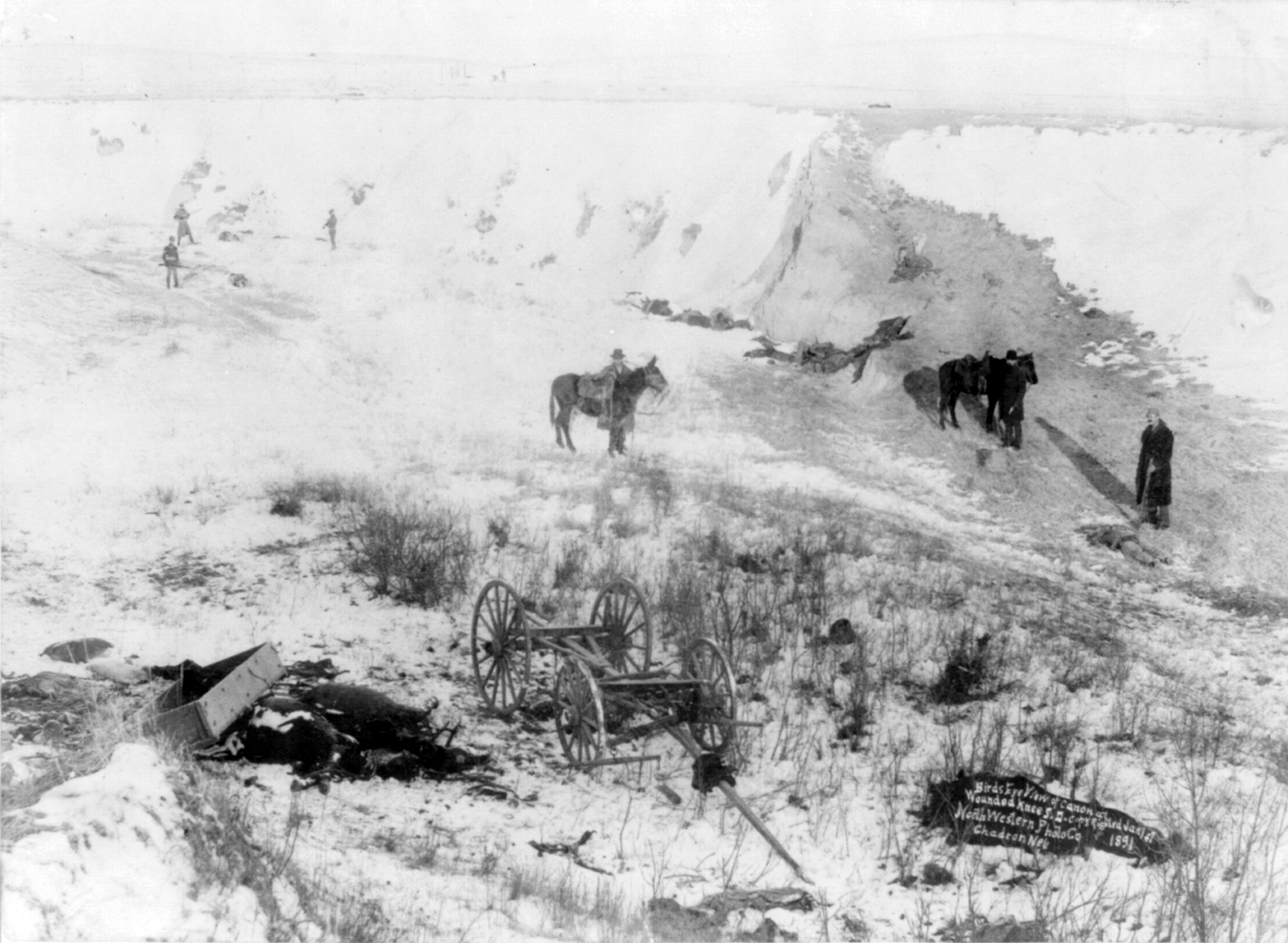
View of canyon at Wounded Knee, dead horses and Lakota bodies are visible.

- Opening of portion of Great Sioux reservation between White and Cheyenne rivers.
- Messiah war. Sitting Bull killed. Battle of Wounded Knee.
- Pine Ridge Campaign, 1890–1891
- Second year of alarming drought. Many settlers destitute.

1891

- Good conditions restored.

1895

- Walter W. Taylor, state treasurer, defaults for $367,000, and absconds. Returned and is convicted.
- Period of great depression and hard times.

1896

- The tide turns. Beginning of long period of prosperity.

1897

- Springfield Normal presented to the state to be a public educational institution

1898

- Spanish War. First South Dakota Infantry sent to Philippines. Distinguished service there.

1899

- First South Dakota Infantry returns from Philippines crowned with glory. President McKinley welcomes the regiment home.

== 20th century ==
1901

- Northern Normal and Industrial School opens at Aberdeen.

1903

- Wind Cave National Park is established on January 9.

1904

- Opening of portion of Rosebud land brings unprecedented rush of homesteaders. One hundred and six thousand persons apply for right to enter lands.
- Mitchell contests with Pierre for state capital. Pierre for third time successful.

1905

- Construction begins on the South Dakota State Capitol building in Pierre.

1924

- The Meridian Highway Bridge connects Yankton with Nebraska and is the first permanent structure crossing the Missouri River.

1927

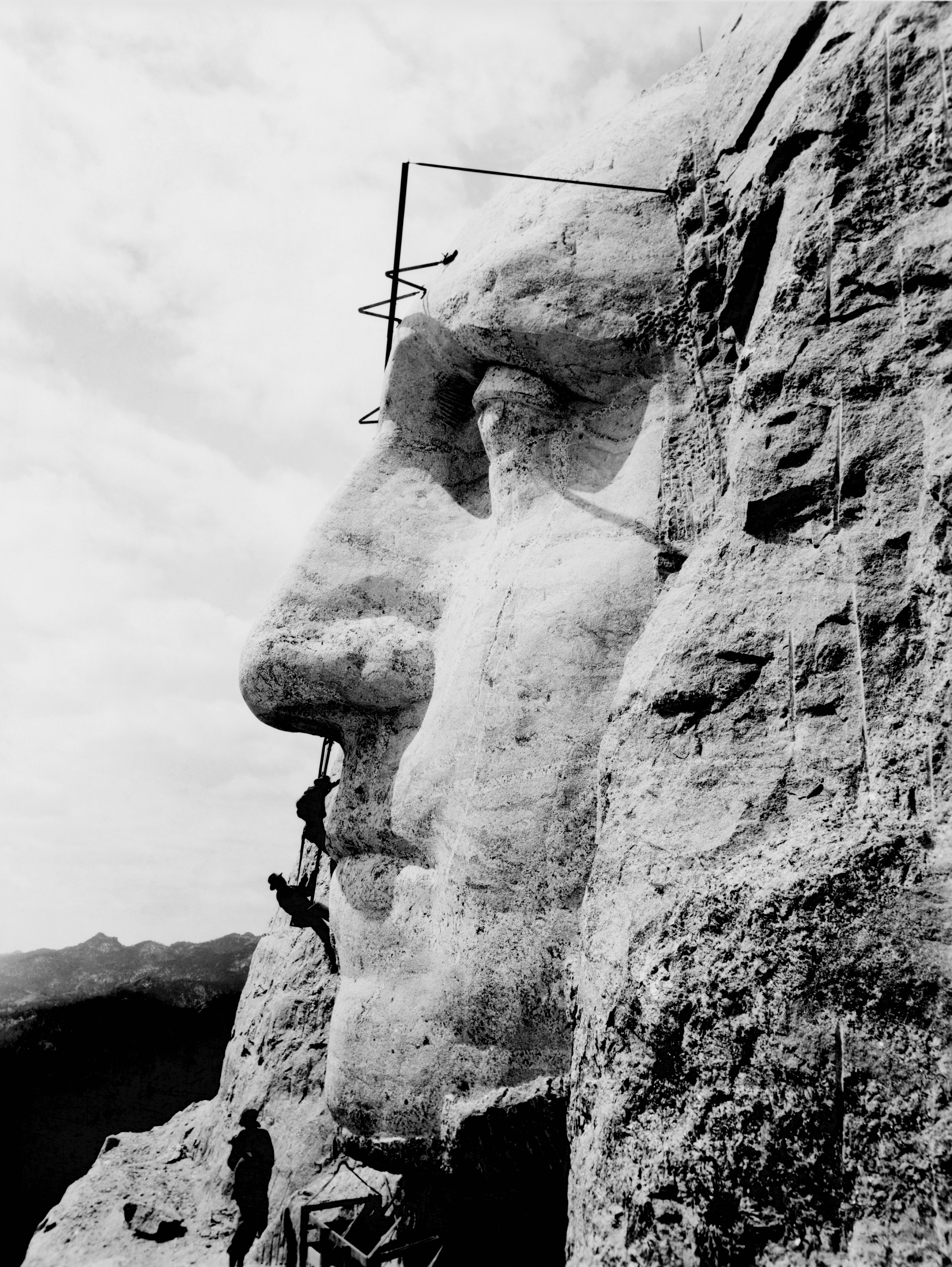
Construction of the Mount Rushmore monument

- Gutzon and Lincoln Borglum begin work on Mount Rushmore National Memorial, completing the sculpture in 1941.

1933

- An extremely strong dust storm strips topsoil.

1934

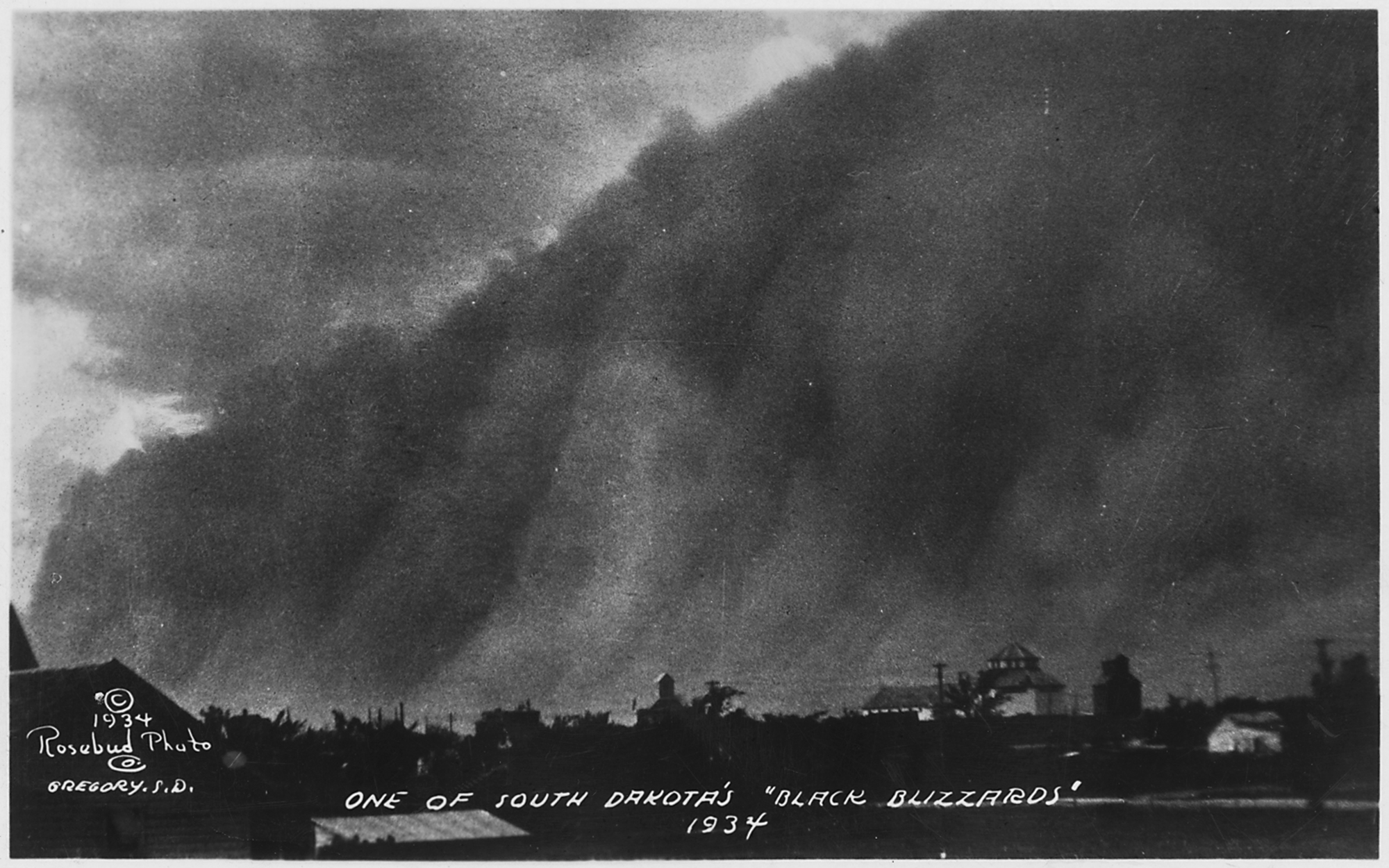
Dust Storms, "One of South Dakota's Black Blizzards, 1934"

- Shelterbelts of trees are established in East River to reduce erosion from dust storms.

1935

- Flandreau Indian Reservation established per the Indian Reorganization Act of 1934.

1936

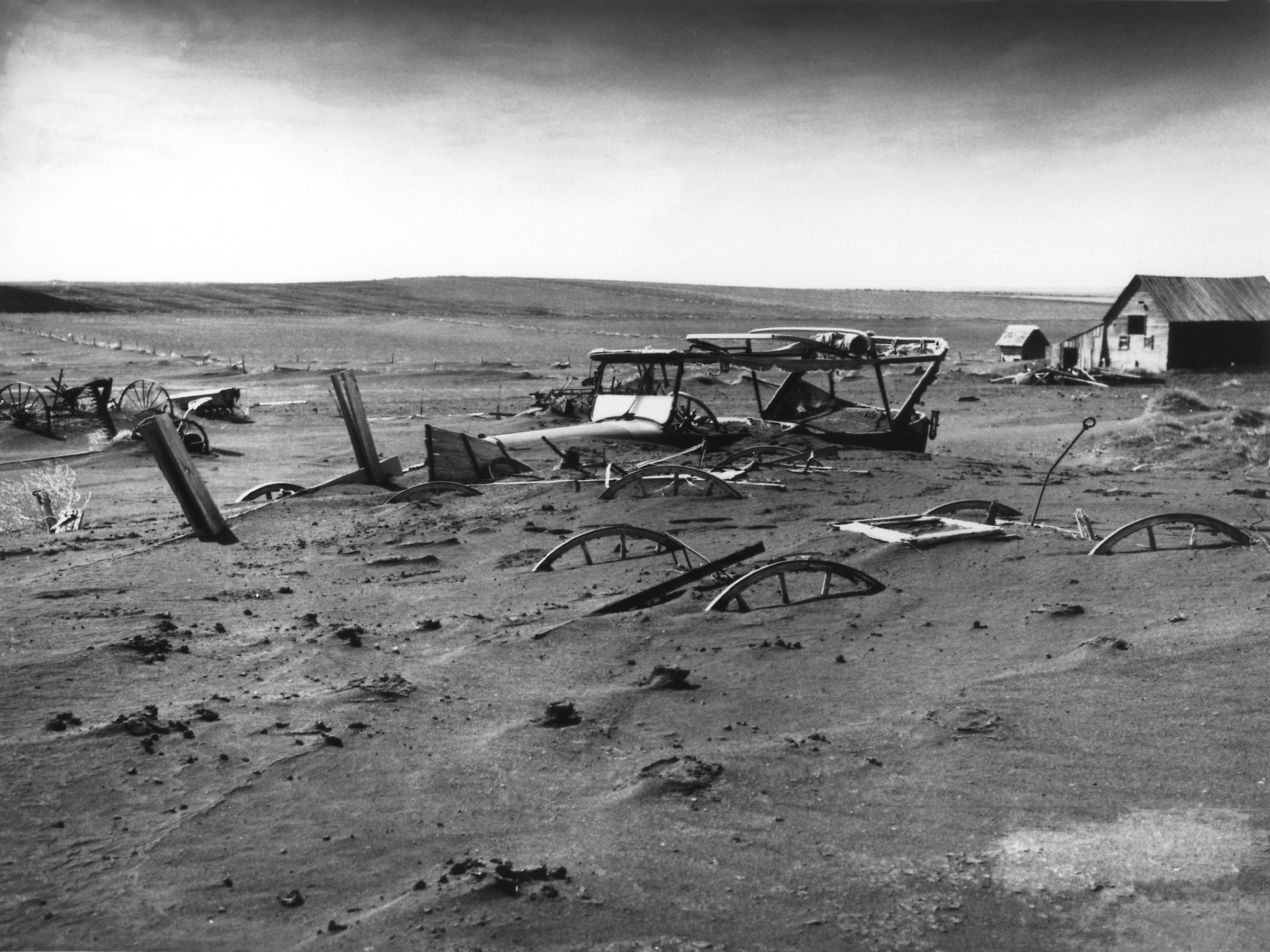
Dust Bowl - Dallas, South Dakota 1936

- Following a severely cold winter, a severe summer heat wave hits South Dakota.

1938

- Gladys Pyle becomes the first woman to serve as United States Senator from South Dakota.
- Motorcycle enthusiasts convene at the first Sturgis Motorcycle Rally.

1946

- Work begins on the Fort Randall Dam.

1948

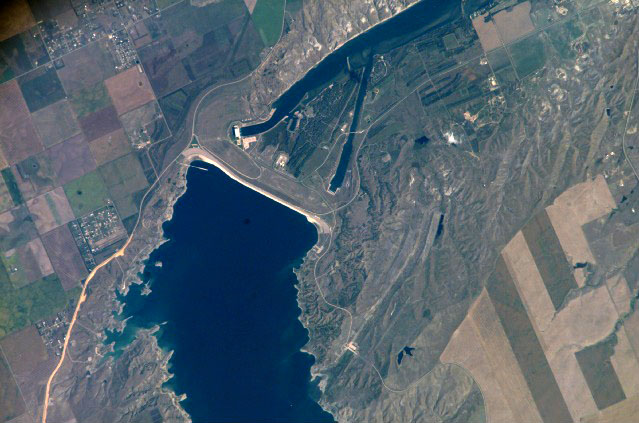
Oahe Dam from the International Space Station

- Work begins on the Oahe Dam.
- Korczak Ziolkowski begins sculpting Crazy Horse Memorial.

1952

- Work begins on the Gavins Point Dam.

Late 1950s

- Interstate 90 is dedicated along the South Dakota-Minnesota border.

1959

- Work begins on the Big Bend Dam.

1961

- Interstate 29 extends into South Dakota from Iowa. The interstate highway is connected to Fargo during the 1960s.

1972

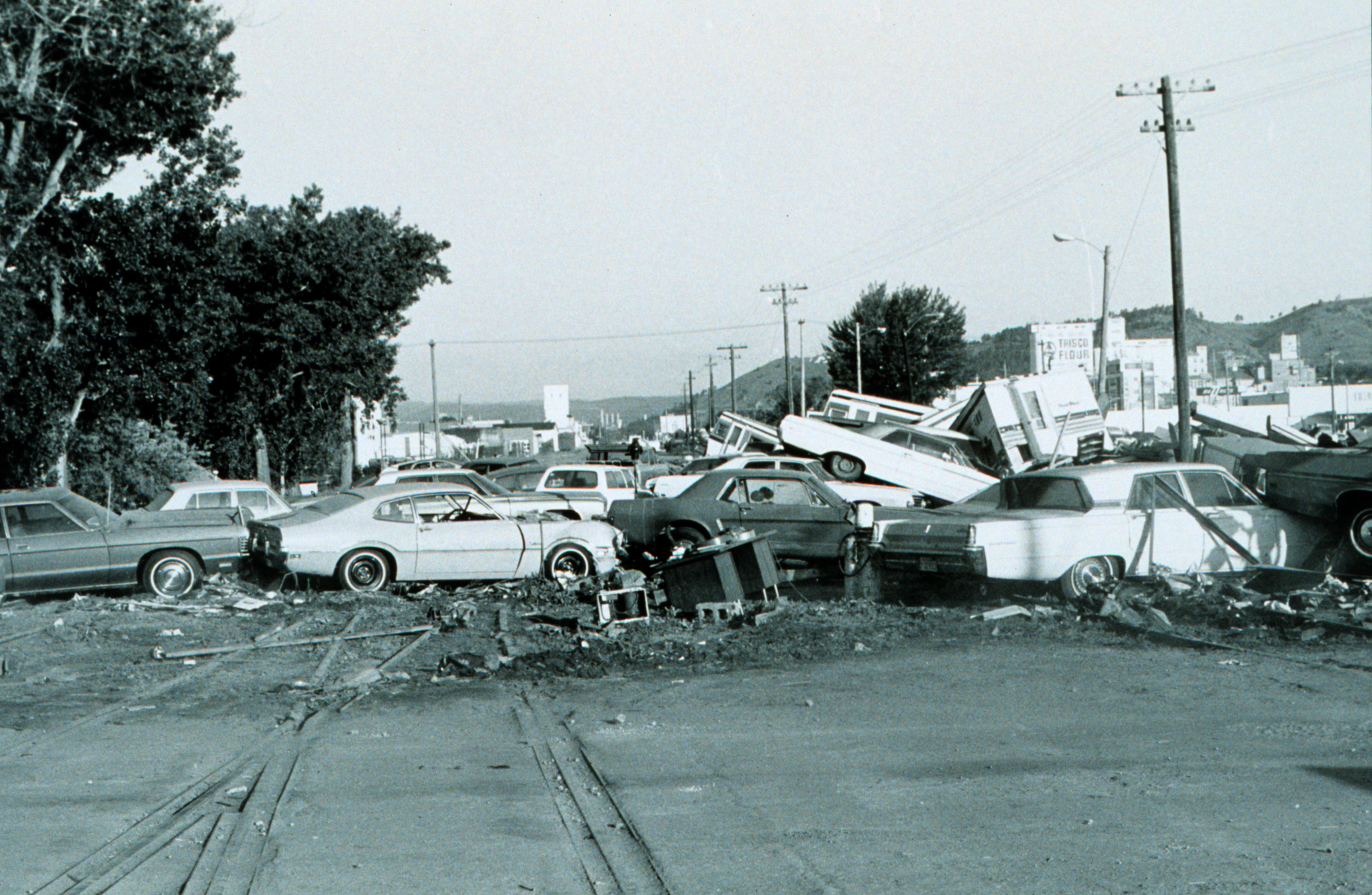
Cars jumbled together by the flood.

- Rapid Creek floods, killing 238 people in Rapid City.

1973

- Between February 27 and May 8, 200 Oglala Lakota and followers of the American Indian Movement occupy Wounded Knee on the Pine Ridge Indian Reservation.

1978

- Badlands National Park is established on November 10.

1980

- Significant abandonment of unprofitable rail lines in the state occurs.

1981

- Citibank moves its credit card operations from New York City to Sioux Falls, leading to significant expansion of the financial industry in the state.

1988

- A severe drought and dust storm closes schools across the state.

== 21st century ==
2002

- Judith Meierhenry becomes the first woman to serve as a justice of the South Dakota Supreme Court.
- The Homestake Gold Mine ceases operations.

2004

- Stephanie Herseth Sandlin becomes the first woman to serve as a United States representative from South Dakota.

2012

- An underground scientific research facility is the new tenant of the old Homestake mine.

2013

- The October Cattleman's Blizzard kills thousands of livestock in West River.

2019

- Kristi Noem becomes the first woman to serve as Governor of South Dakota.

== See also ==
- History of South Dakota
- Outline of South Dakota territorial evolution
- List of South Dakota state legislatures
- Timeline of women's suffrage in South Dakota
- Timeline of United States history
