= List of counties in South Dakota =

Counties of South Dakota
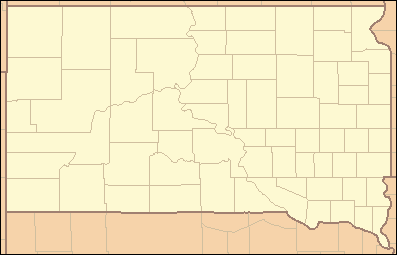
- Location: State of South Dakota
- Number: 66
- Populations: 913 (Jones) – 212,691 (Minnehaha)
- Areas: 412 square miles (1,070 km^{2}) (Clay) – 3,471 square miles (8,990 km^{2}) (Meade)
- Government: County government
- Subdivisions: Cities, towns, townships, unincorporated territories, unorganized territories, census-designated places

There are 66 counties in the U.S. state of South Dakota with FIPS codes.

Todd County and Oglala Lakota County are the only counties in South Dakota which do not have their own county seats. Hot Springs in Fall River County serves as the administrative center for Oglala Lakota County. Winner in Tripp County serves as the administrative center for Todd County. These are two of six counties in South Dakota which are entirely within an Indian reservation. (The other four counties are Bennett, Corson, Dewey, and Ziebach.)

South Dakota's postal abbreviation is SD and its FIPS state code is 46.

== Table of counties ==
County	FIPS code	County seat	Est.	Formed from	Etymology	Population	Area	Map
Aurora County	003	Plankinton	October 1, 1879	Cragin and Wetmore Counties	Aurora, Roman goddess of dawn	2,801	708 sq mi (1,834 km^{2})	State map highlighting Aurora County
Beadle County	005	Huron	October 1, 1879	Buchard, Clark, Kingsbury, and Spink Counties	William Henry Harrison Beadle, chief surveyor of Dakota Territory	19,624	1,259 sq mi (3,261 km^{2})	State map highlighting Beadle County
Bennett County	007	Martin	May 3, 1909	Lugenbeel, Oglala Lakota, Washabaugh, and Washington Counties	Granville G. Bennett, justice of the Supreme Court for the Dakota Territory	3,307	1,185 sq mi (3,069 km^{2})	State map highlighting Bennett County
Bon Homme County	009	Tyndall	April 5, 1862	Unorganized territory	French phrase meaning "good man"	7,244	563 sq mi (1,458 km^{2})	State map highlighting Bon Homme County
Brookings County	011	Brookings	April 5, 1862	Unorganized territory	Wilmot Brookings (1830 - 1905), Dakota Territory Supreme Court justice	37,635	794 sq mi (2,056 km^{2})	State map highlighting Brookings County
Brown County	013	Aberdeen	October 1, 1879	Beadle County	Alfred Brown, territorial legislator	37,561	1,713 sq mi (4,437 km^{2})	State map highlighting Brown County
Brule County	015	Chamberlain	January 14, 1875	Charles Mix County	Brulé Sioux Native Americans	5,278	819 sq mi (2,121 km^{2})	State map highlighting Brule County
Buffalo County	017	Gann Valley	January 6, 1864	Unorganized territory	American bison	1,802	471 sq mi (1,220 km^{2})	State map highlighting Buffalo County
Butte County	019	Belle Fourche	March 6, 1883	Harding County	Buttes in the region	10,856	2,249 sq mi (5,825 km^{2})	State map highlighting Butte County
Campbell County	021	Mound City	January 8, 1873	Buffalo County	Norman B. Campbell, territorial legislator	1,377	736 sq mi (1,906 km^{2})	State map highlighting Campbell County
Charles Mix County	023	Lake Andes	May 8, 1862	Unorganized territory	Charles Eli Mix, commissioner of Indian Affairs	9,303	1,098 sq mi (2,844 km^{2})	State map highlighting Charles Mix County
Clark County	025	Clark	January 8, 1873	Hanson County	Newton Clark (1838-1918), territorial legislator	4,031	958 sq mi (2,481 km^{2})	State map highlighting Clark County
Clay County	027	Vermillion	April 10, 1862	Unorganized territory	Henry Clay (1777 - 1852), U.S. Senator from Kentucky and prominent 19th Century political figure	15,031	412 sq mi (1,067 km^{2})	State map highlighting Clay County
Codington County	029	Watertown	February 15, 1877	Indian lands	George S. S. Codington, territorial legislator	29,562	688 sq mi (1,782 km^{2})	State map highlighting Codington County
Corson County	031	McIntosh	March 2, 1909	Indian lands	Dighton Corson, a Justice of the South Dakota Supreme Court	3,781	2,473 sq mi (6,405 km^{2})	State map highlighting Corson County
Custer County	033	Custer	January 11, 1875	Indian lands	General George Armstrong Custer (1839 - 1876), key figure in the Indian Wars	9,431	1,558 sq mi (4,035 km^{2})	State map highlighting Custer County
Davison County	035	Mitchell	January 8, 1873	Hanson County	Henry C. Davison (1840-1880), prominent merchant and early settler	20,069	436 sq mi (1,129 km^{2})	State map highlighting Davison County
Day County	037	Webster	October 1, 1879	Clark County	Merritt H. Day, territorial legislator	5,484	1,029 sq mi (2,665 km^{2})	State map highlighting Day County
Deuel County	039	Clear Lake	April 5, 1862	Brookings County	Jacob S. Deuel, territorial legislator	4,408	624 sq mi (1,616 km^{2})	State map highlighting Deuel County
Dewey County	041	Timber Lake	January 8, 1873	Armstrong County and Indian lands	William P. Dewey (1833-1905), territorial surveyor-general	5,419	2,303 sq mi (5,965 km^{2})	State map highlighting Dewey County
Douglas County	043	Armour	January 10, 1873	Charles Mix County	Stephen A. Douglas (1813 - 1861), U.S. Senator from Illinois and advocate of popular sovereignty as a middle ground in the slavery debate	2,888	434 sq mi (1,124 km^{2})	State map highlighting Douglas County
Edmunds County	045	Ipswich	January 8, 1873	Buffalo County	Newton Edmunds, Governor of Dakota Territory	4,022	1,146 sq mi (2,968 km^{2})	State map highlighting Edmunds County
Fall River County	047	Hot Springs	April 3, 1883	Custer County	Fall River	7,467	1,740 sq mi (4,507 km^{2})	State map highlighting Fall River County
Faulk County	049	Faulkton	January 8, 1873	Unorganized territory	Andrew Jackson Faulk, Governor of Dakota Territory	2,178	1,000 sq mi (2,590 km^{2})	State map highlighting Faulk County
Grant County	051	Milbank	January 8, 1873	Codington and Deuel Counties	Ulysses S. Grant (1822 - 1885), U.S. President and American Civil War general	7,534	682 sq mi (1,766 km^{2})	State map highlighting Grant County
Gregory County	053	Burke	May 8, 1862	Unorganized territory	John Shaw Gregory (1829-1881), territorial legislator	4,037	1,016 sq mi (2,631 km^{2})	State map highlighting Gregory County
Haakon County	055	Philip	November 3, 1914	Stanley County	King Haakon VII of Norway	1,802	1,834 sq mi (4,750 km^{2})	State map highlighting Haakon County
Hamlin County	057	Hayti	January 8, 1873	Deuel County	Hannibal Hamlin, Vice-President and United States Senator from Maine	6,900	511 sq mi (1,323 km^{2})	State map highlighting Hamlin County
Hand County	059	Miller	January 8, 1873	Buffalo County	George H. Hand (1837-1891), territorial legislator	3,121	1,437 sq mi (3,722 km^{2})	State map highlighting Hand County
Hanson County	061	Alexandria	January 13, 1871	Buffalo and Deuel Counties	Joseph R. Hanson (1836-1917), army major in the Indian Wars and early settler	3,456	435 sq mi (1,127 km^{2})	State map highlighting Hanson County
Harding County	063	Buffalo	March 5, 1881	Unorganized territory	John A. Harding (1832-1902), Speaker of the House for Dakota Territory	1,331	2,671 sq mi (6,918 km^{2})	State map highlighting Harding County
Hughes County	065	Pierre	January 8, 1873	Buffalo County	Alexander Hughes (1846-1907), territorial legislator	17,570	741 sq mi (1,919 km^{2})	State map highlighting Hughes County
Hutchinson County	067	Olivet	May 8, 1862	Unorganized territory	John Hutchinson (1830-1887) territorial legislator	7,413	813 sq mi (2,106 km^{2})	State map highlighting Hutchinson County
Hyde County	069	Highmore	January 8, 1873	Buffalo County	James Hyde (1842–1902), territorial legislator	1,191	861 sq mi (2,230 km^{2})	State map highlighting Hyde County
Jackson County	071	Kadoka	March 8, 1883	Stanley County	J.R. Jackson, territorial legislator	2,666	1,869 sq mi (4,841 km^{2})	State map highlighting Jackson County
Jerauld County	073	Wessington Springs	April 17, 1883	Aurora County	H.J. Jerauld, territorial legislator	1,654	530 sq mi (1,373 km^{2})	State map highlighting Jerauld County
Jones County	075	Murdo	November 7, 1916	Lyman County	George Wallace Jones, territorial legislator	913	971 sq mi (2,515 km^{2})	State map highlighting Jones County
Kingsbury County	077	De Smet	January 8, 1873	Hanson County	George W. Kingsbury (1837-1925) and Theodore A. Kingsbury (1844-1889), brothers and territorial legislators	5,284	838 sq mi (2,170 km^{2})	State map highlighting Kingsbury County
Lake County	079	Madison	January 8, 1873	Brookings and Hanson counties	Lakes within the county	10,993	563 sq mi (1,458 km^{2})	State map highlighting Lake County
Lawrence County	081	Deadwood	January 11, 1875	Unorganized territory	John Lawrence (1839 -1889), territorial legislator	29,459	800 sq mi (2,072 km^{2})	State map highlighting Lawrence County
Lincoln County	083	Canton	April 5, 1862	Unorganized territory	Abraham Lincoln, the 16th President of the United States, or, possibly, Lincoln County, Maine.	77,145	578 sq mi (1,497 km^{2})	State map highlighting Lincoln County
Lyman County	085	Kennebec	January 8, 1873	Unorganized territory	W.P. Lyman, territorial legislator	3,694	1,640 sq mi (4,248 km^{2})	State map highlighting Lyman County
Marshall County	091	Britton	May 2, 1885	Day County	Marshall Vincent, Day County Commissioner	4,426	839 sq mi (2,173 km^{2})	State map highlighting Marshall County
McCook County	087	Salem	January 8, 1873	Hanson County	Edwin McCook, Secretary of Dakota Territory	5,964	575 sq mi (1,489 km^{2})	State map highlighting McCook County
McPherson County	089	Leola	January 8, 1873	Buffalo County	James B. McPherson (1828 - 1864), Civil War general	2,347	1,137 sq mi (2,945 km^{2})	State map highlighting McPherson County
Meade County	093	Sturgis	March 9, 1889	Lawrence County	George Meade (1815 - 1872), Civil War general	30,711	3,471 sq mi (8,990 km^{2})	State map highlighting Meade County
Mellette County	095	White River	June 3, 1909	Lyman County	Arthur C. Mellette, first Governor of South Dakota	2,137	1,307 sq mi (3,385 km^{2})	State map highlighting Mellette County
Miner County	097	Howard	January 8, 1873	Hanson County	Nelson Miner (1827-1879) and Ephriam Miner (1833-1912), brothers and territorial legislators	2,281	570 sq mi (1,476 km^{2})	State map highlighting Miner County
Minnehaha County	099	Sioux Falls	April 5, 1862	Unorganized territory	Sioux term for waterfall	212,691	809 sq mi (2,095 km^{2})	State map highlighting Minnehaha County
Moody County	101	Flandreau	January 8, 1873	Brookings and Minnehaha Counties	Gideon C. Moody, Speaker of the House for Dakota Territory	6,632	520 sq mi (1,347 km^{2})	State map highlighting Moody County
Oglala Lakota County	102		January 11, 1875	Fall River County	Oglala Lakota tribe	13,338	2,094 sq mi (5,423 km^{2})	State map highlighting Oglala Lakota County
Pennington County	103	Rapid City	January 11, 1875	Unorganized territory	John L. Pennington (1829 - 1900), Governor of Dakota Territory	116,792	2,776 sq mi (7,190 km^{2})	State map highlighting Pennington County
Perkins County	105	Bison	November 3, 1908	Butte and Harding Counties	Henry E. Perkins (1864-1937), state senator	2,853	2,872 sq mi (7,438 km^{2})	State map highlighting Perkins County
Potter County	107	Gettysburg	January 8, 1873	Buffalo County	Joel A. Potter (1830-1895), territorial legislator	2,377	866 sq mi (2,243 km^{2})	State map highlighting Potter County
Roberts County	109	Sisseton	March 8, 1883	Grant County	Samuel G. Roberts (b.1843), territorial legislator	10,255	1,101 sq mi (2,852 km^{2})	State map highlighting Roberts County
Sanborn County	111	Woonsocket	May 1, 1883	Miner County	George W. Sanborn (1832-1905), president of the Milwaukee Railroad	2,388	569 sq mi (1,474 km^{2})	State map highlighting Sanborn County
Spink County	115	Redfield	January 8, 1873	Hanson County	Solomon Spink, Secretary of Dakota Territory	6,155	1,504 sq mi (3,895 km^{2})	State map highlighting Spink County
Stanley County	117	Fort Pierre	January 8, 1873	Unorganized territory	David S. Stanley, commander of Fort Sully	3,018	1,443 sq mi (3,737 km^{2})	State map highlighting Stanley County
Sully County	119	Onida	January 8, 1873	Potter County	Fort Sully, itself named after General Alfred Sully	1,479	1,007 sq mi (2,608 km^{2})	State map highlighting Sully County
Todd County	121		June 3, 1909	Meyer and Tripp Counties	John Blair Smith Todd, territorial delegate to Congress	8,863	1,388 sq mi (3,595 km^{2})	State map highlighting Todd County
Tripp County	123	Winner	January 8, 1873	Unorganized territory	Bartlett Tripp, Chief Justice of the Dakota Territorial Supreme Court	5,708	1,614 sq mi (4,180 km^{2})	State map highlighting Tripp County
Turner County	125	Parker	January 13, 1871	Lincoln County	John W. Turner, territorial legislator	9,314	617 sq mi (1,598 km^{2})	State map highlighting Turner County
Union County	127	Elk Point	January 7, 1864	Unorganized territory	The union of the American states	17,402	460 sq mi (1,191 km^{2})	State map highlighting Union County
Walworth County	129	Selby	January 8, 1873	Buffalo County	Walworth County, Wisconsin, itself named for Reuben Walworth	5,217	708 sq mi (1,834 km^{2})	State map highlighting Walworth County
Yankton County	135	Yankton	April 10, 1862	Unorganized territory	Yankton Sioux Native Americans	23,635	522 sq mi (1,352 km^{2})	State map highlighting Yankton County
Ziebach County	137	Dupree	February 1, 1911	Armstrong, Schnasse, and Sterling Counties	Frank M. Ziebach, publisher and army major during the Indian Wars	2,389	1,962 sq mi (5,082 km^{2})	State map highlighting Ziebach County

== Racial / Ethnic Profile of counties in South Dakota (2020 Census) ==
Racial / Ethnic Profile of counties in South Dakota (2020 Census)
Following is a table of counties in South Dakota by race/ethnicity. The majority racial/ethnic group is coded per the key below.

Majority minority with no dominant group
Majority White
Majority Black
Majority Hispanic
Majority Asian
Majority Native American

Racial and ethnic composition of counties in South Dakota (2020 Census) (NH = Non-Hispanic) Note: the US Census treats Hispanic/Latino as an ethnic category. This table excludes Latinos from the racial categories and assigns them to a separate category. Hispanics/Latinos may be of any race.
County	Location of County	Total Population	White alone (NH)	%	Black or African American alone (NH)	%	Native American or Alaska Native alone (NH)	%	Asian alone (NH)	%	Pacific Islander alone (NH)	%	Other race alone (NH)	%	Mixed race or Multiracial (NH)	%	Hispanic or Latino (any race)	%
Aurora		2,747	2,409	87.70%	14	0.51%	38	1.38%	13	0.47%	0	0.00%	0	0.00%	54	1.97%	219	7.97%
Beadle		19,149	13,369	69.82%	142	0.74%	243	1.27%	2,068	10.80%	57	0.30%	28	0.15%	501	2.62%	2,741	14.31%
Bennett		3,381	997	29.49%	7	0.21%	2,060	60.93%	7	0.21%	0	0.00%	2	0.06%	221	6.54%	87	2.57%
Bon Homme		7,003	6,160	87.96%	106	1.51%	455	6.50%	11	0.16%	5	0.07%	6	0.09%	143	2.04%	117	1.67%
Brookings		34,375	29,922	87.05%	628	1.83%	372	1.08%	912	2.65%	13	0.04%	64	0.19%	1,037	3.02%	1,427	4.15%
Brown		38,301	32,705	85.39%	535	1.40%	1,103	2.88%	918	2.40%	44	0.11%	96	0.25%	1,241	3.24%	1,659	4.33%
Brule		5,247	4,340	82.71%	28	0.53%	495	9.43%	26	0.50%	5	0.10%	6	0.11%	241	4.59%	106	2.02%
Buffalo		1,948	286	14.68%	0	0.00%	1,582	81.21%	1	0.05%	0	0.00%	0	0.00%	66	3.39%	13	0.67%
Butte		10,243	9,147	89.30%	12	0.12%	182	1.78%	30	0.29%	5	0.05%	30	0.29%	427	4.17%	410	4.00%
Campbell		1,377	1,270	92.23%	0	0.00%	31	2.25%	6	0.44%	0	0.00%	0	0.00%	33	2.40%	37	2.69%
Charles Mix		9,373	5,720	61.03%	15	0.16%	3,011	32.12%	31	0.33%	14	0.15%	3	0.03%	351	3.74%	228	2.43%
Clark		3,837	3,573	93.12%	12	0.31%	20	0.52%	2	0.05%	2	0.05%	0	0.00%	59	1.54%	169	4.40%
Clay		14,967	12,655	84.55%	235	1.57%	552	3.69%	361	2.41%	4	0.03%	38	0.25%	664	4.44%	458	3.06%
Codington		28,325	25,841	91.23%	109	0.38%	645	2.28%	197	0.70%	3	0.01%	48	0.17%	743	2.62%	739	2.61%
Corson		3,902	957	24.53%	6	0.15%	2,702	69.25%	20	0.51%	0	0.00%	0	0.00%	171	4.38%	46	1.18%
Custer		8,318	7,506	90.24%	32	0.38%	161	1.94%	25	0.30%	0	0.00%	42	0.50%	341	4.10%	211	2.54%
Davison		19,956	17,625	88.32%	127	0.64%	602	3.02%	117	0.59%	0	0.00%	29	0.15%	543	2.72%	913	4.58%
Day		5,449	4,595	84.33%	3	0.06%	536	9.84%	19	0.35%	4	0.07%	1	0.02%	138	2.53%	153	2.81%
Deuel		4,295	4,045	94.18%	10	0.23%	26	0.61%	2	0.05%	5	0.12%	1	0.02%	69	1.61%	137	3.19%
Dewey		5,239	849	16.21%	9	0.17%	4,082	77.92%	6	0.11%	0	0.00%	4	0.08%	208	3.97%	81	1.55%
Douglas		2,835	2,653	93.58%	7	0.25%	33	1.16%	3	0.11%	1	0.04%	1	0.04%	83	2.93%	54	1.90%
Edmunds		3,986	3,779	94.81%	12	0.30%	39	0.98%	23	0.58%	0	0.00%	0	0.00%	72	1.81%	61	1.53%
Fall River		6,973	5,932	85.07%	35	0.50%	391	5.61%	47	0.67%	11	0.16%	29	0.42%	348	4.99%	180	2.58%
Faulk		2,125	2,003	94.26%	2	0.09%	45	2.12%	3	0.14%	0	0.00%	1	0.05%	25	1.18%	46	2.16%
Grant		7,556	6,806	90.07%	0	0.00%	71	0.94%	16	0.21%	3	0.04%	8	0.11%	172	2.28%	480	6.35%
Gregory		3,994	3,491	87.41%	9	0.23%	264	6.61%	21	0.53%	4	0.10%	2	0.05%	151	3.78%	52	1.30%
Haakon		1,872	1,717	91.72%	2	0.11%	34	1.82%	14	0.75%	2	0.11%	14	0.75%	70	3.74%	19	1.01%
Hamlin		6,164	5,666	91.92%	5	0.08%	41	0.67%	13	0.21%	6	0.10%	11	0.18%	134	2.17%	288	4.67%
Hand		3,145	2,992	95.14%	7	0.22%	11	0.35%	7	0.22%	0	0.00%	14	0.45%	65	2.07%	49	1.56%
Hanson		3,461	3,316	95.81%	5	0.14%	6	0.17%	0	0.00%	0	0.00%	15	0.43%	86	2.48%	33	0.95%
Harding		1,311	1,205	91.91%	5	0.38%	29	2.21%	0	0.00%	0	0.00%	7	0.53%	33	2.52%	32	2.44%
Hughes		17,765	14,085	79.29%	83	0.47%	2,068	11.64%	128	0.72%	4	0.02%	51	0.29%	856	4.82%	490	2.76%
Hutchinson		7,427	7,009	94.37%	9	0.12%	88	1.18%	21	0.28%	0	0.00%	17	0.23%	126	1.70%	157	2.11%
Hyde		1,262	1,088	86.21%	4	0.32%	99	7.84%	5	0.40%	1	0.08%	3	0.24%	38	3.01%	24	1.90%
Jackson		2,806	1,045	37.24%	11	0.39%	1,509	53.78%	7	0.25%	3	0.11%	4	0.14%	166	5.92%	61	2.17%
Jerauld		1,663	1,545	92.90%	0	0.00%	11	0.66%	3	0.18%	0	0.00%	0	0.00%	30	1.80%	74	4.45%
Jones		917	773	84.30%	4	0.44%	49	5.34%	0	0.00%	0	0.00%	2	0.22%	78	8.51%	11	1.20%
Kingsbury		5,187	4,926	94.97%	5	0.10%	25	0.48%	11	0.21%	7	0.13%	2	0.04%	92	1.77%	119	2.29%
Lake		11,059	9,849	89.06%	85	0.77%	114	1.03%	66	0.60%	11	0.10%	28	0.25%	300	2.71%	606	5.48%
Lawrence		25,768	22,935	89.01%	128	0.50%	486	1.89%	196	0.76%	18	0.07%	51	0.20%	1,032	4.00%	922	3.58%
Lincoln		65,161	58,509	89.79%	1,116	1.71%	432	0.66%	993	1.52%	9	0.01%	154	0.24%	2,269	3.48%	1,679	2.58%
Lyman		3,718	1,915	51.51%	3	0.08%	1,627	43.76%	4	0.11%	0	0.00%	1	0.03%	123	3.31%	45	1.21%
McCook		5,682	5,277	92.87%	9	0.16%	51	0.90%	4	0.07%	0	0.00%	10	0.18%	156	2.75%	175	3.08%
McPherson		2,411	2,265	93.94%	3	0.12%	27	1.12%	3	0.12%	1	0.04%	0	0.00%	59	2.45%	53	2.20%
Marshall		4,306	3,599	83.58%	6	0.14%	324	7.52%	12	0.28%	1	0.02%	0	0.00%	109	2.53%	255	5.92%
Meade		29,852	25,294	84.73%	408	1.37%	784	2.63%	275	0.92%	48	0.16%	87	0.29%	1,655	5.54%	1,301	4.36%
Mellette		1,918	651	33.94%	1	0.05%	1,101	57.40%	3	0.16%	0	0.00%	7	0.36%	116	6.05%	39	2.03%
Miner		2,298	2,183	95.00%	4	0.17%	8	0.35%	6	0.26%	0	0.00%	5	0.22%	50	2.18%	42	1.83%
Minnehaha		197,214	155,740	78.97%	11,411	5.79%	4,807	2.44%	4,568	2.32%	71	0.04%	554	0.28%	8,029	4.07%	12,034	6.10%
Moody		6,336	4,828	76.20%	19	0.30%	740	11.68%	86	1.36%	0	0.00%	25	0.39%	324	5.11%	314	4.96%
Oglala Lakota		13,672	438	3.20%	24	0.18%	12,530	91.65%	39	0.29%	0	0.00%	5	0.04%	234	1.71%	402	2.94%
Pennington		109,222	82,743	75.76%	1,363	1.25%	10,927	10.00%	1,463	1.34%	78	0.07%	411	0.38%	6,662	6.10%	5,575	5.10%
Perkins		2,835	2,651	93.51%	2	0.07%	64	2.26%	5	0.18%	3	0.11%	8	0.28%	64	2.26%	38	1.34%
Potter		2,472	2,314	93.61%	6	0.24%	55	2.22%	14	0.57%	0	0.00%	3	0.12%	41	1.66%	39	1.58%
Roberts		10,280	5,577	54.25%	32	0.31%	3,932	38.25%	27	0.26%	0	0.00%	18	0.18%	479	4.66%	215	2.09%
Sanborn		2,330	2,182	93.65%	0	0.00%	20	0.86%	9	0.39%	0	0.00%	0	0.00%	62	2.66%	57	2.45%
Spink		6,361	5,995	94.25%	23	0.36%	61	0.96%	2	0.03%	0	0.00%	1	0.02%	136	2.14%	143	2.25%
Stanley		2,980	2,553	85.67%	12	0.40%	193	6.48%	5	0.17%	9	0.30%	5	0.17%	172	5.77%	31	1.04%
Sully		1,446	1,334	92.25%	5	0.35%	10	0.69%	6	0.41%	0	0.00%	0	0.00%	49	3.39%	42	2.90%
Todd		9,319	685	7.35%	10	0.11%	8,122	87.16%	45	0.48%	0	0.00%	0	0.00%	235	2.52%	222	2.38%
Tripp		5,624	4,312	76.67%	10	0.18%	972	17.28%	5	0.09%	0	0.00%	4	0.07%	267	4.75%	54	0.96%
Turner		8,673	8,043	92.74%	37	0.43%	54	0.62%	12	0.14%	2	0.02%	13	0.15%	263	3.03%	249	2.87%
Union		16,811	14,994	89.19%	169	1.01%	120	0.71%	247	1.47%	27	0.16%	29	0.17%	564	3.35%	661	3.93%
Walworth		5,315	4,116	77.44%	8	0.15%	786	14.79%	11	0.21%	0	0.00%	9	0.17%	286	5.38%	99	1.86%
Yankton		23,310	20,195	86.64%	312	1.34%	638	2.74%	129	0.55%	9	0.04%	41	0.18%	752	3.23%	1,234	5.29%
Ziebach		2,413	404	16.74%	0	0.00%	1,899	78.70%	3	0.12%	3	0.12%	2	0.08%	68	2.82%	34	1.41%

== Former names ==
- Shannon County: renamed Oglala Lakota County in 2015
- Boreman County: Renamed Corson County in 1909
- Mandan County: Renamed Lawrence County

== Former counties ==
- Armstrong County (1883–1952): Created by Dakota Territory as Pyatt County in 1883 from Cheyenne, Rusk (Dewey), and Stanley Counties. Renamed Armstrong in 1895. The western half was annexed to form part of the second Ziebach County, in 1911. The remainder was annexed into Dewey in 1952.
- Ashmore County
- Big Sioux County
- Bramble County
- Bruguier County
- Burchard County
- Burdick County
- Cheyenne County
- Choteau County: Abolished when it merged into Perkins County along with Martin, Rinehart and Wagner Counties.
- Cole County: organized in 1862, was named for Austin Cole, who was a member of the first Territorial Legislature. Two years later, the boundaries were rearranged and the name changed to Union because of sentiment for the Union side of the civil war.
- Cragin County
- Delano County: Absorbed by Meade County
- Ewing County (1889–1890): Created upon statehood. Abolished one year later, when it became the northern half of Harding County.
- Forsythe County
- Greely County, South Dakota
- Jayne County
- Lugenbeel County (1875–1909): Created by Dakota Territory from unorganized lands and Meyer and Pratt Counties in 1875. Abolished in 1909 when it became part of Bennett and Todd Counties.
- Martin County: Abolished when it merged into Perkins County along with Choteau, Rinehart and Wagner Counties.
- Meyer County
- Midway County
- Mills County
- Nowlin County (1883–1898): Created by Dakota Territory in 1883 from Cheyenne and White River Counties. Abolished in 1898 when it became part of Haakon County.
- Presho County: Absorbed by Lyman County
- Pyatt County (1883–1895): Created by Dakota Territory from unorganized lands in 1883. Renamed Armstrong in 1895. Later divided between the revived Ziebach County and Dewey County.
- Rinehart County: Abolished when it merged into Perkins County along with Choteau, Martin, and Wagner Counties.
- Rusk County
- Schnasse County (1883–1911): Created by Dakota Territory from unorganized lands and part of Boreman County in 1883. Later absorbed into Boreman and the revived Ziebach Counties
- Scobey County: Absorbed by Meade County
- Sterling County (1883–1911): Created by Dakota Territory from Cheyenne County. Abolished in 1911 when it became part of Haakon and Ziebach Counties
- Stone County
- Thompson County
- Wagner County: Abolished when it merged into Perkins County along with Choteau, Martin, and Rinehart Counties.
- Washabaugh County (1883–1983): South Dakota's most recent county to be eliminated. Created by Dakota Territory in 1883. Abolished in 1983 when it was merged with Jackson County.
- Washington County (1888–1943): Abolished in 1943 when it was divided between Pennington and Shannon Counties.
- Wetmore County
- White River County
- Wood County
- Ziebach County (1889–1890): Created in 1889, upon statehood. Abolished in 1890, becoming the eastern portion of Pennington County. The name was revived in 1911, when a second Ziebach County was created from parts of Sterling, Schnasse and Pyatt Counties.

== Population density map ==
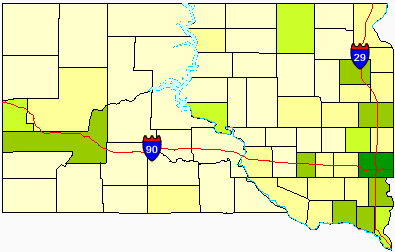
Map showing the density of South Dakota's counties

Darker colors indicate heavier density.

== See also ==
- List of U.S. counties
