= Andrew Jackson Faulk =

American politician (1814–1898)

Andrew Faulk
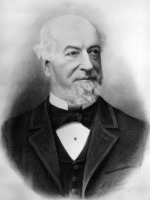

3rd Governor of the Dakota Territory
- In office September 3, 1866 – May 10, 1869
- Preceded by: Newton Edmunds
- Succeeded by: John A. Burbank

Personal details
- Born: Andrew Jackson Faulk; November 26, 1814 Milford, Pennsylvania, U.S.
- Died: September 4, 1898 (aged 83) Yankton, South Dakota, U.S.
- Party: Democratic (before 1856); Republican (1856–1898)

Andrew Jackson Faulk (November 26, 1814 – September 4, 1898) was an American politician. He served as the third Governor of Dakota Territory.

== Early life ==
Faulk was born at Milford, Pike County, Pennsylvania, the son of John Faulk and his wife Margaret Heiner, a descendant of General Daniel Brodhead. Faulk moved with his family to Kittanning, Pennsylvania, where he was educated. He learned the printing trade and later edited the Armstrong County Democrat. He studied law and became involved with the Democratic party. Faulk served as county treasurer and then joined the Pennsylvania militia. Because of the slave issue, Faulk left the Democratic party to support John C. Frémont in 1856 and Abraham Lincoln in 1860.

== Career ==
Faulk was appointed chief clerk at the Yankton Agency in 1861 and worked for Dr. Walter A. Burleigh(son-in-law to A.J. Faulk). After the Santee uprising in 1862, he and his daughters returned to Pennsylvania. Dakota Territory Governor, Newton Edmunds assisted the investigation by a congressional committee of Walter Burleigh's corrupt behavior on the Yankton Reservation from 1861 to 1864; and, Burleigh responded by presenting charges against Governor Edmunds to President Andrew Johnson. Burleigh recommended that Edmunds be replaced by Andrew J. Faulk. In August 1866, President Johnson dismissed Newton Edmunds and appointed Faulk as Governor of Dakota Territory. After arriving at Yankton, Dakota Territory on September 3, 1866, Faulk relieved Edmunds of his duties and served as the interim Governor until officially assuming the office on March 16, 1867.

Because of reports of pine timber and mineral wealth in the Black Hills, Faulk wanted to exclude that area from any future Indian reservation and to open it to white settlement. General William T. Sherman said that whites had no right to enter and occupy the Black Hills; since, the Indians had not ceded the area. In 1868, a group of entrepreneurs planned to invade the Black Hills without military protection. Officially, Governor Faulk said that he did not sanction this invasion; while, his rhetoric actually encouraged it. Because of his efforts to open the Black Hills to white settlement, Faulk was popular with entrepreneurs and adventurers in Dakota Territory.

On May 10, 1869, President Ulysses S. Grant removed Faulk as governor and replaced him with John A. Burbank. Faulk remained in the Dakota Territory and went on to fill a vacancy in the mayor's office in Yankton in 1869 before becoming clerk of the United States District Court for Dakota Territory in 1873. When Governor Nehemiah Ordway attempted to remove the Dakota Territory capital from Yankton, Faulk worked to have Ordway dismissed. On April 19, 1877, Faulk participated in the meeting to adopt a statehood resolution; and in 1883, he attended the constitutional convention.

== Death ==
Faulk continued to reside in Yankton, South Dakota, until the time of his death. He died on September 4, 1898, in Yankton, South Dakota.

== Legacy ==
Andrew Jackson Faulk is the namesake of Faulkton, South Dakota, and Faulk County, South Dakota.

Political offices
Preceded by Newton Edmunds	Governor of the Dakota Territory; 1866–1869	Succeeded by John A. Burbank
