= Governor Pennington =

Governor Pennington may refer to:

- John L. Pennington (1829–1900), 5th Governor of Dakota Territory
- William Pennington (1796–1862), 13th Governor of New Jersey
- William Sanford Pennington (1757–1826), 6th Governor of New Jersey
