= Newton Edmunds =

American politician

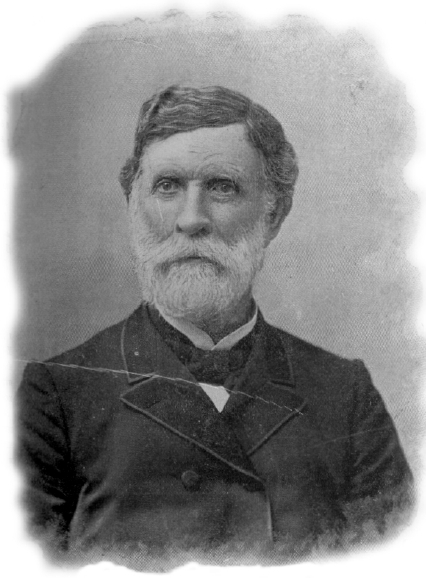

2nd Governor of the Dakota Territory
- In office October 17, 1863 – September 3, 1866
- Preceded by: William Jayne
- Succeeded by: Andrew Jackson Faulk

Personal details
- Born: May 31, 1819 Hartland, New York, U.S.
- Died: February 13, 1908 (aged 88) Yankton, South Dakota, U.S.
- Party: Republican

Newton Edmunds (May 31, 1819 – February 13, 1908) was an American politician who served as the second Governor of Dakota Territory, serving during the American Civil War.

== Biography ==
=== Early life and career ===
Newton Edmunds was born in Hartland, New York on May 31, 1819. In 1832, he moved with his family to Michigan. The Edmunds family was involved with politics, associating with the Free Soilers before affiliating with the Republican Party. Newton Edmunds' brother, C. E. Edmunds, was Commissioner of the United States Land Office. Newton Edmunds was appointed as chief clerk in the surveyor-general's office, resulting in Edmunds' arrival in Dakota Territory in 1861. On August 30, 1862, Edmunds was elected as eighth corporal of Company A of the Dakota Militia, following the Santee uprising.

=== Governor of Dakota Territory ===
On October 17, 1863, Edmunds was appointed Governor of Dakota Territory by President Abraham Lincoln after receiving strong support from former Governor William Jayne. Edmunds took the oath of office on November 2. He helped establish a public school system as well as a regular revenue system in Dakota Territory. Edmunds also promoted advanced farming techniques and successfully introduced sheep to Dakota Territory in 1865.

Edmunds also believed that warring conditions with the Indians in the territory impeded white settlement by creating a negative public perception of Dakota Territory. In October 1865, Edmunds and his commission began to negotiate with Indian tribes located along the Missouri River; and eventually, the commission reached treaty agreements with thirteen tribes. Dr. Walter A. Burleigh opposed Governor Edmunds' peace policy with the Indians, recommending that Edmunds be dismissed from office, claiming that Edmunds had mismanaged Indian Affairs with a scheme to steal money from the Indian Bureau. On August 8, 1866, Edmunds was dismissed by President Andrew Johnson and was replaced by Andrew Jackson Faulk, father-in-law of Dr. Burleigh.

=== Later life and death ===
After leaving office, Edmunds remained involved in both business and politics in Dakota Territory. Edmunds continued to serve in treaty commissions to negotiate with Indian tribes. He played a role in establishing rail service between Yankton and Sioux City. In 1873, Edmunds and Leighton Wynn opened the Yankton State Bank. During the 1880s, he joined the statehood movement, attending the first constitutional convention in Sioux Falls September 1883. In September 1891, Edmunds and his two sons established the Yankton National Bank. Edmunds remained active in business in Yankton until the time of his death on February 13, 1908.

Newton Edmunds is the namesake of Edmunds County, South Dakota.

In 1964, he was inducted into the Hall of Great Westerners of the National Cowboy & Western Heritage Museum.

== Notes ==
Political offices
Preceded by William Jayne	Governor of the Dakota Territory; 1863–1866	Succeeded by Andrew Jackson Faulk
