= Wilmot Brookings =

American judge

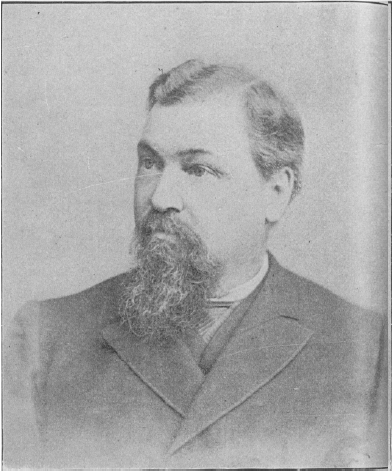

Governor of the Dakota Territory
- Acting
- In office January 1859 – March 2, 1861
- Preceded by: Position established
- Succeeded by: William Jayne

Personal details
- Born: Wilmot Wood Brookings; October 23, 1830 Woolwich, Maine, U.S.
- Died: June 13, 1905 (aged 74) Boston, Massachusetts, U.S.
- Party: Republican
- Spouse: Clara Carney
- Education: Bowdoin College (BA)

Wilmot Wood Brookings (October 23, 1830 – June 13, 1905) was an American pioneer, frontier judge, and early South Dakotan politician. He was provisional governor of the Dakota Territory, and both the cities of Wilmot and Brookings as well as the county of Brookings, South Dakota are named for him.

== Early life ==
Brookings was born on October 23, 1830, in Woolwich, Maine, to Abner and Susannah Bayley Brookings. (The 1860 Dakota Territory census lists his birthplace, possibly incorrectly, as North Carolina). Brookings attended Bowdoin College in Brunswick, Maine, graduating in 1855. He married Clara Carney of Dresden, Maine, and went on to teach at Litchfield, North Anson, and Wiscasset before being admitted to the bar in May 1857.

== Dakota Territory ==
Brookings moved to Sioux Falls, Minnesota Territory on August 27, 1857, where he helped pioneers organize a county government (Minnehaha County). The county appointed him district attorney.

In February 1858, Brookings rode a horse from Sioux Falls to the Yankton area during a blizzard. His horse slipped and fell into Split Rock Creek in the freezing weather. Brookings made it safely to Yankton, but his wet legs had suffered such severe frostbite they both needed to be amputated. He spent the rest of his life using a pair of squeaky, wooden legs that caused him discomfort and sometimes made walking difficult.

=== Provisional governor ===
When Minnesota was admitted to the union in 1858, Sioux Falls became part of the newly forming Dakota Territory. Though Dakota Territory did not officially form until 1861, an interim provisional government formed in January 1859 and elected Brookings to the upper house of the interim territorial legislature. That legislative body later appointed Brookings Governor of Dakota Territory. However, the federal government refused to acknowledge either the provisional government or its territorial governor (his term lasted until March 2, 1861) as official. When the region finally did become an organized territory in 1861, Brookings was elected to the Territory Council for two years and later served three straight terms as a representative from Yankton County. In 1864 he served as territory speaker of the house and was appointed superintendent of the U.S. Military Wagon Road from Minnesota to Montana in 1865.

=== Later political career ===
After the assassination of Abraham Lincoln, territory Republicans opposing Lincoln's Democratic successor Andrew Johnson nominated Brookings as their congressional delegate, on an anti-Johnson platform. Brookings lost to fellow Republican Walter A. Burleigh.

Brookings served on the Territorial Council from 1867 to 1869, including a stint as council president in 1868. He also served as district attorney for Yankton County from 1867 to 1868. In 1869 President Ulysses S. Grant appointed him associate justice of the Supreme Court of the Dakota Territory. Brookings served in this capacity through 1873. Between 1883 and 1885 he worked as a member of South Dakota's constitutional convention.

On July 3, 1871, Brookings County was formally organized and named after him. The city of Brookings, South Dakota was also named for him, though he only ever visited the town twice. In 1871 Brookings helped organize the Dakota Southern Railroad, and spent the next ten years serving as an executive for the railroads that would eventually become part of Chicago, Milwaukee, St. Paul and Pacific Railroad. Brookings was among the first to ride a locomotive into Dakota Territory when the first Dakota Southern train entered the region on October 1, 1872.

=== Later life and death ===
In January 1885, Brookings bought and became editor of the Sioux Falls Leader newspaper (which later merged with the Sioux Falls Argus and became known as the Argus Leader). Brookings also served as president of the Minnehaha Trust Company, Director of the Sioux Falls National Bank, National Realty Company, and Safe Deposit Company.

Brookings died riding a streetcar in Boston, Massachusetts, on June 13, 1905, while on a return trip from visiting his hometown in Woolwich, Maine. He is buried in Yankton, South Dakota.

Political offices
New office	Governor of the Dakota Territory; Acting; 1859–1861	Succeeded by William Jayne
