= John A. Burbank =

American politician

John Burbank
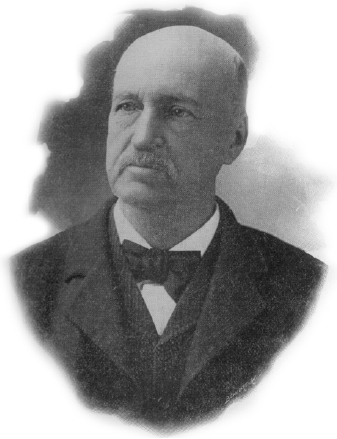

4th Governor of the Dakota Territory
- In office October 1873 – January 1, 1874
- Preceded by: Edwin Stanton McCook (Acting)
- Succeeded by: John L. Pennington
- In office May 10, 1869 – April 1873
- Preceded by: Andrew Jackson Faulk
- Succeeded by: Edwin Stanton McCook (Acting)

Personal details
- Born: John Albyne Burbank; July 23, 1827 Centerville, Indiana, U.S.
- Died: December 17, 1905 (aged 78) Richmond, Indiana, U.S.
- Party: Republican

John Albyne Burbank (July 23, 1827 – December 17, 1905) was an American businessman and the fourth Governor of Dakota Territory.

== Early life and career ==
Burbank was born at Centerville, Wayne County, Indiana. After finishing school, he entered into the merchandising business with his father. In 1857, Burbank laid out the site of Falls City, Nebraska, and became the town's first mayor. He also served as postmaster and was a businessman in the community.

President Abraham Lincoln appointed Burbank as agent for the Iowa and Sac Indian tribes in Missouri. After working in the office of the Governor of Indiana and then in the wholesale crockery business, Burbank moved to western Dakota Territory and assisted in the organization of Wyoming Territory.

On May 10, 1869, President Ulysses S. Grant appointed Burbank as the Governor of Dakota Territory at a time when factions within the territory's Republicans were quarreling. When he took office, Burbank intended to make money in Dakota Territory through speculation and patronage.

During his first year and a half in office, he became a member of the real estate firm, J. R. Hanson and Company. Because of his financial interests, Burbank neglected his duties as Governor and became unpopular as a result. He used his authority as Governor to abuse federal patronage to improve his own financial well-being. In 1873, the Secretary of the Dakota Territory, Edwin S. McCook, took over as acting governor in Burbank's stead, but was assassinated in Yankton on September 11, 1873, by Peter P. Wintermute, a disgruntled constituent.

Burbank managed to become reappointed as governor with the help of his brother-in-law, Senator Oliver P. Morton. After a scandal involving the Dakota Southern Railroad, Governor Burbank finally resigned on January 1, 1874.

== Death ==
After his departure from the office, he returned to Indiana and spent the rest of his life in the town of Richmond, dying on December 17, 1905, at age 78. Burbank spent a number of years as United States post office inspector.

Political offices
| Preceded by Andrew Jackson Faulk | Governor of the Dakota Territory; 1869–1873 | Succeeded by Edwin Stanton McCook; Acting |
| Preceded by Edwin Stanton McCook; Acting | Governor of the Dakota Territory; 1873–1874 | Succeeded by John L. Pennington |
