= Gilbert A. Pierce =

American politician

Gilbert Pierce
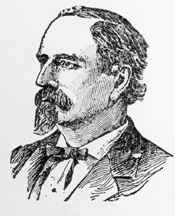

United States Senator from North Dakota
- In office November 25, 1889 – March 3, 1891
- Preceded by: Seat established
- Succeeded by: Henry C. Hansbrough

8th Governor of the Dakota Territory
- In office June 25, 1884 – February 5, 1887
- Preceded by: Nehemiah G. Ordway
- Succeeded by: Louis K. Church

Member of the Indiana House of Representatives
- In office 1868

Personal details
- Born: Gilbert Ashville Pierce; January 11, 1839 East Otto, New York, U.S.
- Died: February 15, 1901 (aged 62) Chicago, Illinois, U.S.
- Party: Republican
- Education: University of Chicago

Gilbert Ashville Pierce (January 11, 1839 – February 15, 1901) was an American author, journalist, playwright, and a member of the Indiana House of Representatives, the eighth governor of Dakota Territory (serving from 1884 to 1887), and representative for North Dakota in the United States Senate. Pierce County, North Dakota was named in his honor.

== Biography ==
Gilbert Pierce was born at East Otto, Cattaraugus County, New York. He and his parents moved to Indiana. Pierce attended the University of Chicago; where he studied writing, literature, and law. He enlisted in the ninth Indiana Volunteers as a second lieutenant in 1861. By 1864, Pierce was a colonel and an inspector general of the War Department.

In 1868, he became a member of the Indiana House of Representatives. From 1868 to 1871, Pierce was a journal clerk of the United States Senate. After resigning, he edited a Republican Chicago newspaper called the Inter Ocean as well as wrote a number of plays, novels, and sketches. In 1877, Pierce became managing editor of the Inter Ocean before assuming a similar position for the Chicago News.

On June 25, 1884, Gilbert Pierce was appointed Governor of Dakota Territory by President Chester A. Arthur. Because of the corruption of his predecessor, Governor Pierce's appointment was treated with suspicion by residents of Dakota Territory. Because of bad feelings over the moving of the territorial capital, Pierce chose to be sworn in at the former capital city of Yankton on July 25, 1884, before assuming office at the new capital of Bismarck. With time, the new Governor gained respect in the territory.

Governor Pierce vetoed a bill to move the capital from Bismarck to Pierre. He and the legislature did agree to establish the School of Mines at Rapid City. Pierce vetoed a bill to grant equal suffrage to women. He was a proponent of statehood and quickly signed a bill into law to authorize a state constitutional convention for southern Dakota Territory.

In August 1886, Governor Pierce resigned but remained in office until February 5, 1887. After leaving office, he served in Bismarck as a correspondent for newspapers in St. Paul, Minnesota. After North Dakota became a state in 1889, Pierce was elected to one term as United States Senator.

In 1891, he purchased a half interest in the Minneapolis Tribune before selling it to become business manager of the Chicago Post and Times-Herald. In 1893, Pierce was appointed U.S. Minister to Portugal by President Benjamin Harrison; but failing health forced Pierce to resign after only a few months.

Pierce's last years were spent in British Columbia, Washington, and California before the time of his death at the Lexington Hotel in Chicago, aged 62.

== Sources ==
- United States Congress. "Gilbert A. Pierce (id: P000334)". Biographical Directory of the United States Congress.

Political offices
| Preceded by Nehemiah G. Ordway | Governor of the Dakota Territory; 1884–1887 | Succeeded by Louis K. Church |
U.S. Senate
| New seat | U.S. Senator (Class 3) from North Dakota; 1889–1891; Served alongside: Lyman R. Casey | Succeeded by Henry C. Hansbrough |
