= Edward Ball (Ohio politician) =

American politician (1811–1872)

11th Sergeant at Arms of the United States House of Representatives
- In office July 5, 1861 – December 8, 1863
- Preceded by: Henry W. Hoffman
- Succeeded by: Nehemiah G. Ordway

Member of the U.S. House of Representatives from Ohio's 16th district
- In office March 4, 1853 – March 3, 1857
- Preceded by: John Johnson
- Succeeded by: Cydnor B. Tompkins

Member of the Ohio House of Representatives
- In office 1845-1849

Personal details
- Born: Edward Ball; November 6, 1811 Fairfax County, Virginia, US
- Died: November 22, 1872 (aged 61) Zanesville, Ohio, US
- Resting place: Greenwood Cemetery
- Party: Whig; Anti-Nebraska

Edward Ball (November 6, 1811 – November 22, 1872) was an American farmer and law enforcement officer who served two-term as a U.S. representative from Ohio from 1853 to 1857.

== Biography ==
Born in Fairfax County, Virginia, near Falls Church, Ball attended the village school. He moved to Ohio and located near Zanesville, where he engaged in agricultural pursuits.

=== Early career ===
He served as deputy sheriff of Muskingum County in 1837 and 1838 and sheriff from 1839 to 1843. He served as member of the Ohio House of Representatives from 1845 to 1849, and became editor of the Zanesville Courier in 1849.

=== Congress ===
Ball was elected as a Whig to the Thirty-third Congress and reelected as an Anti-Nebraska candidate to the Thirty-fourth Congress (March 4, 1853 – March 3, 1857). In Congress, he served as chairman of the Committee on Public Buildings and Grounds (Thirty-fourth Congress). He was not a candidate for renomination in 1856.

=== Later career ===
After his tenure in Congress, Ball studied law, was admitted to the bar in 1860, and commenced practice in Zanesville. He served as delegate to the Republican National Convention at Chicago in 1860, and as Sergeant at Arms of the House of Representatives in the Thirty-seventh Congress from 1861 to 1863.

He resumed the practice of law, and was again a member of the State house of representatives from 1868 to 1870.

=== Death ===
He was accidentally killed by a railroad train near Zanesville, Ohio, on November 22, 1872.

== Sources ==
- United States Congress. "Edward Ball (id: B000098)". Biographical Directory of the United States Congress.

U.S. House of Representatives
Preceded by John Johnson	Member of the U.S. House of Representatives from Ohio's 16th congressional district 1853 - 1857	Succeeded by Cydnor B. Tompkins
Preceded by Henry William Hoffman	Sergeant at Arms of the United States House of Representatives; 1861 - 1863	Succeeded by Nehemiah G. Ordway
Ohio House of Representatives
Preceded by David Johns	Representative from Muskingum County; December 1, 1845-December 6, 1846; Served alongside: John Trimble	Succeeded by John Trimble
Preceded by Abel Randall	Representative from Muskingum County; December 3, 1849-December 1, 1850	Succeeded by William Morgan
