= Dakota Territory's at-large congressional district =

Former U.S. House district

Coordinates: 46°N 104°W

- Obsolete district
- Created: 1861, as a non-voting delegate was granted by Congress
- Eliminated: 1889, as a result of statehood as North Dakota and South Dakota
- Years active: 1861–1889

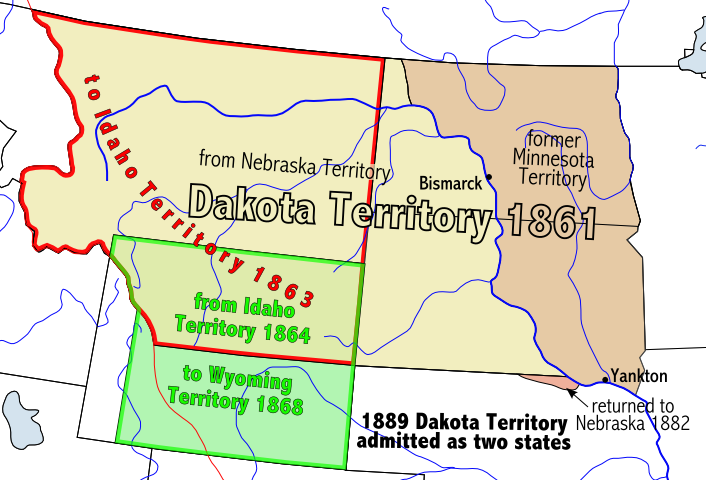
Dakota Territory, 1861-1889

Dakota Territory's at-large congressional district is an obsolete congressional district that encompassed the entire Dakota Territory prior to admission to the Union. The district elected a delegate to the United States Congress.

== History ==
Established by Congress in 1861, Dakota Territory comprised North and South Dakota, northern Wyoming, and most of Montana, from what had previously been the northern portion of Nebraska Territory.

From 1861 to 1889, Dakota Territory sent a single non-voting Delegate to the United States House of Representatives.

Over time, parts of the Territory were divided into Idaho Territory, Wyoming Territory, and Nebraska Territory. On November 2, 1889, the remaining Territory was split between the new states of North Dakota and South Dakota.

== List of delegates representing the district ==
Delegate (Residence)	Party	Years	Cong ress	Electoral history
John Blair Smith Todd (Fort Randall)	Democratic	December 9, 1861 – March 3, 1863	37th	Elected in 1861. Lost re-election.
William Jayne (Yankton)	Republican	March 4, 1863 – June 17, 1864	38th	Elected in 1862. Lost election contest.
John Blair Smith Todd (Yankton)	Democratic	June 17, 1864 – March 3, 1865	38th	Won election contest. Lost re-election.
Walter A. Burleigh (Yankton)	Republican	March 4, 1865 – March 3, 1869	39th 40th	Elected in 1864. Re-elected in 1866. Lost re-election.
Solomon Lewis Spink (Yankton)	Republican	March 4, 1869 – March 3, 1871	41st	Elected in 1868. Lost re-election.
Moses K. Armstrong (Yankton)	Democratic	March 4, 1871 – March 3, 1875	42nd 43rd	Elected in 1870. Re-elected in 1872. Lost re-election.
Jefferson P. Kidder (Vermillion)	Republican	March 4, 1875 – March 3, 1879	44th 45th	Elected in 1874. Re-elected in 1876. Lost renomination.
Granville G. Bennett (Yankton)	Republican	March 4, 1879 – March 3, 1881	46th	Elected in 1878. Retired.
Richard F. Pettigrew (Sioux Falls)	Republican	March 4, 1881 – March 3, 1883	47th	Elected in 1880. Lost re-election.
John B. Raymond (Fargo)	Republican	March 4, 1883 – March 3, 1885	48th	Elected in 1882. Lost renomination.
Oscar S. Gifford (Canton)	Republican	March 4, 1885 – March 3, 1889	49th 50th	Elected in 1884. Re-elected in 1886. Retired.
George A. Mathews (Brookings)	Republican	March 4, 1889 – November 2, 1889	51st	Elected in 1888. District abolished upon statehood.

== Bibliography ==
- "Our Campaigns - United States - Territory of Dakota - DK Congressional Delegate". www.ourcampaigns.com.
