= List of governors of Dakota Territory =

The governor of Dakota Territory was the head of government of Dakota Territory, a territory of the United States from March 2, 1861, to November 2, 1889, when it was split into the states of North Dakota and South Dakota.

== Governors ==
Eleven people were appointed governor of Dakota Territory by the President of the United States during its existence, though one, John F. Potter, declined the post.

A provisional government formed in January 1859 and elected Wilmot Brookings as territorial governor, but the federal government refused to acknowledge the provisional government as official.

Governors of the Territory of Dakota
No.	Governor	Term in office (Note: The range given is from the date the governor was confirmed by the Senate, or appointed by the President during a Senate recess, to the date the governor's successor was confirmed, unless noted.)	Appointed by
1	William Jayne (Note: When Jayne absent from the territory, Territorial Secretary John Hutchinson acted as governor.) (1826–1916)	May 27, 1861 (Note: Jayne was nominated on March 23, 1861; confirmed by the Senate on March 27; and arrived in the territory around late May 1861.) – March 1, 1863 (644 days; resigned) (Note: Jayne resigned, having been elected to the United States House of Representatives.)	Abraham Lincoln
2	Newton Edmunds (1819–1908)	October 6, 1863 (Note: John F. Potter was nominated on March 6, 1863, and confirmed by the Senate on March 9, but declined the post. Edmunds was appointed on October 6, 1863, during a Senate recess, and he accepted the appointment on October 17, taking the oath of office on November 2. He was nominated on January 7, 1864, and confirmed by the Senate on February 2.) – August 4, 1866 (1034 days; replaced)	Abraham Lincoln
3	Andrew Jackson Faulk (Note: While Faulk was not in the territory, Territorial Secretary Solomon L. Spink acted as governor.) (1814–1898)	August 4, 1866 (Note: Faulk was appointed on August 4, 1866, during a Senate recess; nominated on December 14, 1866; and confirmed by the Senate on March 2, 1867. He arrived in the territory on September 4, 1866.) – May 10, 1869 (1011 days; replaced)	Andrew Johnson
4	John A. Burbank (Note: While Burbank was not in the territory, Territorial Secretaries George H. Hand, George A. Batchelder, Edwin Stanton McCook, and Oscar A. Whitney acted as governor; McCook was killed while acting as governor.) (1827–1905)	May 10, 1869 (Note: Burbank was nominated on April 3, 1869; confirmed by the Senate on April 5; and arrived on the territory on April 29. He was reconfirmed by the Senate on March 17, 1873.) – January 1, 1874 (1698 days; resigned) (Note: Burbank resigned in the face of political pressure.)	Ulysses S. Grant
5	John L. Pennington (1829–1900)	January 1, 1874 (Note: Pennington was nominated on December 15, 1873, for a term to begin in January; confirmed by the Senate on December 18, 1873; and arrived in the territory on January 29, 1874.) – March 12, 1878 (1532 days; replaced)	Ulysses S. Grant
6	William Alanson Howard (1813–1880)	March 12, 1878 (Note: Howard was nominated on February 18, 1878; confirmed by the Senate on March 12; and arrived in the territory on April 12.) – April 10, 1880 (761 days; died in office)	Rutherford B. Hayes
7	Nehemiah G. Ordway (1828–1907)	May 22, 1880 (Note: Ordway was nominated on May 14, 1880; confirmed by the Senate on May 22; and arrived in the territory on June 23.) – July 2, 1884 (1503 days; replaced)	Rutherford B. Hayes
8	Gilbert A. Pierce (1839–1901)	July 2, 1884 (Note: Pierce was nominated on June 27, 1884, and confirmed by the Senate on July 2.) – February 3, 1887 (947 days; resigned) (Note: Pierce resigned to avoid political conflict in a letter dated November 15, 1886, and was expected to remain in office until he could turn affairs over to his successor; however, according to McMullin & Walker, since the confirmation process took so long, Territorial Secretary Michael L. McCormack acted as governor until Church arrived on February 17, 1887.)	Chester A. Arthur
9	Louis K. Church (1846–1897)	February 3, 1887 (Note: Church was nominated on December 14, 1886; confirmed by the Senate on February 3, 1887; and arrived in the territory on February 17, 1887.) – March 13, 1889 (770 days; resigned) (Note: Church resigned due to a change in the party in power, and submitted his resignation upon President Harrison's taking office, though McMullin & Walker say it was dated March 9. It is assumed it took effect when his successor took office, as Church was reportedly still performing his duties on March 13.)	Grover Cleveland
10	Arthur C. Mellette (1842–1896)	March 13, 1889 (Note: Mellette was nominated on March 12, 1889, and confirmed by the Senate on March 13.) – November 2, 1889 (235 days; elected state governor) (Note: Mellette was elected governor of South Dakota.)	Benjamin Harrison

== See also ==
- List of governors of North Dakota
- List of governors of South Dakota

== Sources ==
- McMullin, Thomas A.; Walker, David (1984). Biographical Directory of American Territorial Governors. Meckler Publishing. ISBN 0-930466-11-X – via Internet Archive.
