= William Jayne =

American politician and physician

Delegate to the U.S. House of Representatives from Dakota Territory's at-large district
- In office March 4, 1863 – June 17, 1864
- Preceded by: John Todd
- Succeeded by: John Todd

1st Governor of the Dakota Territory
- In office May 27, 1861 – March 4, 1863
- Preceded by: Wilmot Brookings (acting)
- Succeeded by: Newton Edmunds

Personal details
- Born: William Jayne; October 8, 1826 Springfield, Illinois, U.S.
- Died: March 20, 1916 (aged 89) Springfield, Illinois, U.S.
- Resting place: Oak Ridge Cemetery
- Party: Republican
- Spouse: Julia Witherbee
- Education: Illinois College; University of Missouri (MD)

William A. Jayne (October 8, 1826 – March 20, 1916) was an American politician and physician. He served as Governor of the Dakota Territory and as the territory's delegate to the United States House of Representatives during the American Civil War.

Jayne was born in Springfield, Illinois. He attended Illinois College in 1844 where he was a founding member and served as first president of Phi Alpha Literary Society. He formed part of the three-man committee that prepared the society's constitution. He graduated in medicine from the University of Missouri in 1849. He began his practice in Springfield and served as Abraham Lincoln's personal physician. He became mayor of Springfield in 1859, and then a member of the State Senate in 1860, but resigned in 1861 to accept the appointment by President Lincoln to be the first Governor of Dakota Territory. He served from May 27, 1861, until 1863, then as a Delegate to the House of Representatives from March 4, 1863, to June 17, 1864.

Jayne then returned to Springfield and continued the practice of medicine. He was appointed U.S. Pension Agent in 1869 for four years and served three terms as mayor of Springfield beginning in 1876. He also served as Director and Vice President of the First National Bank of Springfield. He resumed the practice of medicine in 1873.

Jayne married Julia Witherbee in 1850 and had six children with her. He died in Springfield and is interred in Oak Ridge Cemetery in Springfield.

Political offices
Preceded by Wilmot Brookings; Acting	Governor of the Dakota Territory; 1861–1863	Succeeded by Newton Edmunds
U.S. House of Representatives
Preceded by John Todd	Delegate to the U.S. House of Representatives from Dakota Territory's at-large congressional district 1863–1865	Succeeded by John Todd
