= John Blair Smith Todd =

American general (1814–1872)

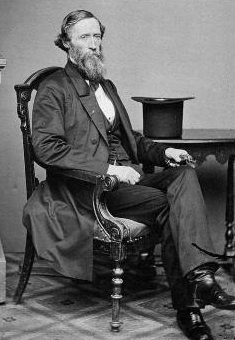
- Born: April 4, 1814; Lexington, Kentucky, U.S.
- Died: January 5, 1872 (aged 57); Yankton County, Dakota Territory
- Burial place: Yankton City Cemetery, Yankton, South Dakota
- Military career
- Allegiance: United States of America; Union
- Branch: United States Army; Union Army
- Service years: 1837–1856, 1861–1862
- Rank: Brigadier General
- Conflicts: Seminole Wars; Mexican–American War -Siege of Veracruz -Battle of Cerro Gordo; American Civil War
- Other work: Delegate from Dakota Territory to the United States House of Representatives

John Blair Smith Todd (April 4, 1814 – January 5, 1872) was a Delegate from Dakota Territory to the United States House of Representatives and a general in the Union Army during the American Civil War.

== Early life, education, and family ==
Todd was born in Lexington, Kentucky in 1814 to John and Elizabeth (Smith) Todd, and moved with his parents to Illinois in 1827. His first cousin was Mary Todd Lincoln, wife of Abraham Lincoln. Thus he was cousin-in-law with the President. Another cousin-in-law was Confederate General Benjamin Hardin Helm. Helm's father was Kentucky Governor John Helm; Helm's mother was a first cousin, three times removed of Colonel John Hardin, who was related to three Kentucky Congressmen.

Todd graduated from the United States Military Academy at West Point, New York, in 1837, and was assigned to the 6th U.S. Infantry. He was promoted to first lieutenant on December 25 and served with his regiment in the Seminole War from 1837 until 1840. He returned home on recruiting service during part of 1841, and again in active service in the Florida war during the remainder of that year and part of 1842.

== Military career ==
He was made captain in 1843, and was on frontier duty in Indian Territory and Arkansas until 1846. He served in the Mexican–American War in 1847, taking part in the Siege of Veracruz and the battles of Cerro Gordo and Amazoque. Todd was on garrison and frontier duty till 1855, when he was engaged in the action of Blue Water against the Sioux Indians. He resigned from the United States Army on September 16, 1856, and became an Indian trader, settling at Fort Randall, Dakota Territory. He was admitted to the bar in 1861 and commenced the practice of law in Yankton.

With the outbreak of the Civil War, he was appointed on September 19, 1861, as a brigadier general of Volunteers. He was in command of the North Missouri district from October 15 until December 1, 1861. He resigned from the Army on July 17, 1862.

== Dakota Territory ==
He was a delegate to the 37th and 38th United States Congress, between 1861 and 1865. When the Dakota Territory was formed, Todd was elected as a Democrat to the House, serving from December 9, 1861, to March 3, 1863. He was reelected to serve from June 17, 1864, to March 3, 1865. He was an unsuccessful candidate for reelection in 1864, and returned to Yankton. He served as speaker of the territorial House of Representatives in 1866 and 1867. He was once again unsuccessful in running for the nomination for a Congressional seat in 1868.

He died in Yankton County at age 57 and is interred in Yankton Cemetery. Todd County, South Dakota and Todd County, Minnesota are named after him.

== See also ==
- List of American Civil War generals (Union)

== Notes ==
U.S. House of Representatives
Preceded by None, first in line	Delegate to the U.S. House of Representatives from Dakota Territory; December 9, 1861 – March 3, 1863	Succeeded by William Jayne
Preceded by William Jayne	Delegate to the U.S. House of Representatives from Dakota Territory; June 17, 1864 – March 3, 1865	Succeeded by Walter A. Burleigh
