= John L. Pennington =

American politician

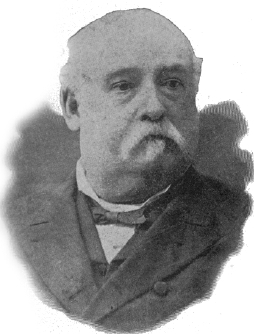

5th Governor of the Dakota Territory
- In office January 1, 1874 – April 12, 1878
- Preceded by: John A. Burbank
- Succeeded by: William Alanson Howard

Personal details
- Born: 1829 New Bern, North Carolina, U.S.
- Died: July 9, 1900 (aged 70–71) Anniston, Alabama, U.S.
- Party: Republican

John L. Pennington (1829 – July 9, 1900) was an American politician and newspaper publisher. He was an Alabama state senator, and the fifth Governor of Dakota Territory.

== Biography ==
Pennington was born at the town of New Berne in Craven County, North Carolina. He started a career in journalism by working as an apprentice for the "Raleigh Star." In 1856, Pennington founded the "Columban" in Columbia, South Carolina. In 1857, he founded the "Daily Progress" in New Bern, North Carolina.

After leaving the newspaper business in 1866, Pennington became a member of the Republican party and joined the carpetbaggers in Alabama, where he served as a member of the Alabama legislature until 1873.

On January 1, 1874, Pennington was appointed as Governor of Dakota Territory by President Ulysses S. Grant after a recommendation by George E. Spencer. In 1875, Pennington County was established and named after the governor.

During Pennington's time as governor, the gold rush was starting in the Black Hills; Jack McCall was tried and hanged in Yankton for the murder of "Wild Bill" Hickok; and, railroad construction and immigration had both slowed. People in the Black Hills wanted control over their own political future; and, separatists wanted to form their own territory called Lincoln. In the spring of 1877, Judge Granville was assigned to the Black Hills judicial district; and as a result, the separatist movement ended.

Because of his lack of popularity in the Black Hills and negative reports on his character in Yankton, Pennington was replaced by William Alanson Howard as Governor of Dakota Territory in April 1878. He was part of the "Yankton Gang" that tried to consolidate territorial power in their city. However, Pennington was considered to be more honest than most of the appointed governors and he continued to live in Yankton after leaving the governorship. He built several houses and a major commercial structure in the city.

Governor Howard appointed Pennington as collector of internal revenue for Dakota Territory. In 1885, Pennington returned to journalism and established the "Weekly Telegram" at Yankton. In September 1883, Pennington attended the constitutional convention in Sioux Falls, where he opposed dividing Dakota Territory into two states. In 1891, Pennington left Yankton, South Dakota, to resume journalism in the South. He died in Anniston, Alabama and is buried at the Oxford Cemetery in nearby Oxford, Alabama.

Governor Pennington's home at 410 E. Third Street in Yankton, built in 1875, is one of that city's most historical structures and the only territorial governor's home still standing. Pennington was a journalist; the house is now home to South Dakota Magazine, a publication that explores the history and culture of the state. Two smaller houses also built by Pennington are part of the magazine's small campus.

Political offices
Preceded by John A. Burbank	Governor of the Dakota Territory; 1874–1878	Succeeded by William Alanson Howard
