= Nehemiah G. Ordway =

American politician (1828-1907)

Nehemiah Ordway
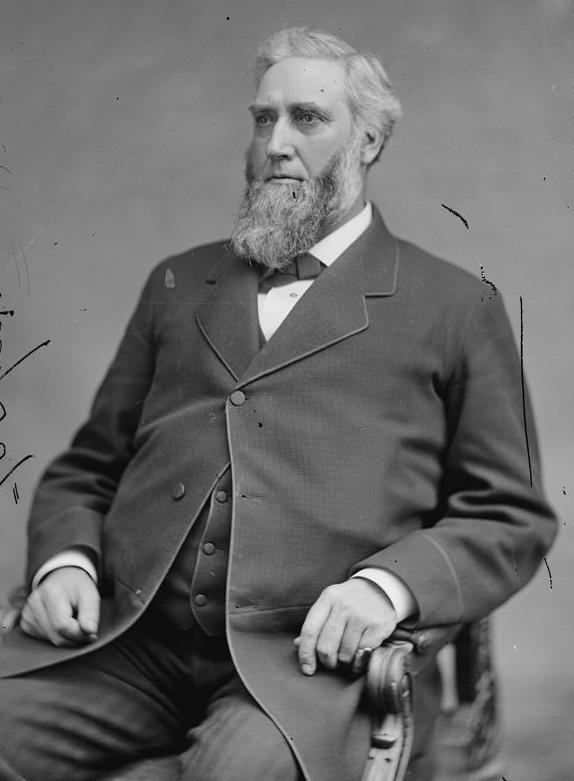

7th Governor of the Dakota Territory
- In office June 1, 1880 – June 25, 1884
- Preceded by: William Alanson Howard
- Succeeded by: Gilbert A. Pierce

Sergeant at Arms of the United States House of Representatives
- In office December 8, 1863 – December 6, 1875
- Preceded by: Edward Ball
- Succeeded by: John Thompson

Personal details
- Born: Nehemiah George Ordway; November 10, 1828 Warner, New Hampshire, U.S.
- Died: July 3, 1907 (aged 78) Waterloo, New Hampshire, U.S.
- Party: Republican

Nehemiah George Ordway (November 10, 1828 – July 3, 1907) was an American politician who was a New Hampshire state senator and the seventh Governor of Dakota Territory. Ordway was regarded as one of Dakota Territory's most controversial governors.

Nehemiah Ordway was born in Warner, New Hampshire. After receiving his education, Ordway entered the mercantile and banking businesses. During Abraham Lincoln's bid for the Presidency in 1860, Ordway served as chairman in New Hampshire for the new Republican party. In 1862, he was appointed General Agent of the Post Office Department for the New England states. From 1863 until 1875, Ordway served as Sergeant at Arms of the United States House of Representatives in Washington, D.C. He organized Center Market in Washington, DC and controlled it for the remainder of his life. From 1875 until 1880, Ordway served as state senator in New Hampshire.

The New Hampshire congressional delegation nominated Nehemiah Ordway for the office of Governor of Dakota Territory. In May 1880, he was appointed by President Rutherford B. Hayes. Ordway was confirmed on June 1, 1880; he arrived in Yankton with his wife and son on June 23, 1880.

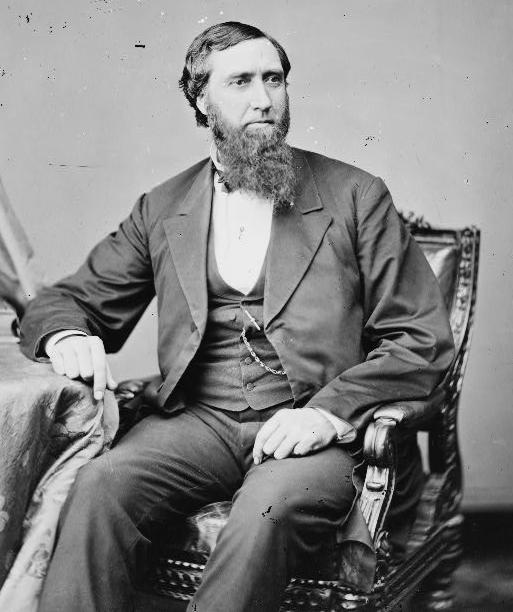
Nehemiah G. Ordway, c. 1865

During his time as governor, Ordway made efforts to move the territorial capitol to Bismarck. This action angered political leaders in Yankton and Sioux Falls. Citizens of Yankton viewed Ordway as corrupt.

On February 2, 1881, nine consecutive days of snowfall started in Dakota Territory, resulting in food and fuel shortages. Governor Ordway sought Army and Indian supplies until private donations could be obtained. Eventually, he obtained $7000 in cash contributions as well as six tons of relief supplies.

According to records, Governor Ordway engaged in a number of questionable dealings. In May 1881, Richard F. Pettigrew filed charges against Governor Ordway, insisting on his removal from office. On June 2, 1883, Ordway successfully moved the capital of Dakota Territory from Yankton to Bismarck with the assistance of Alexander McKenzie, an agent for the Northern Pacific Railway. In the fall of 1883, representatives of southern counties made further efforts to remove Ordway from office. He was indicted for corruption and President Chester A. Arthur replaced him with Gilbert A. Pierce in 1884.

After leaving office, Ordway remained in Bismarck for a number of years because of investments. He lobbied for the Northern Pacific Railway and fought against separate statehood for the southern counties. During the 1890s, Ordway returned to New Hampshire, where he managed two large farms and spent the rest of his life.

Nehemiah G. Ordway is the namesake of the community of Ordway, South Dakota.

== Sources ==
- Nehemiah Ordway's biography at the Historical Society of North Dakota website
- Profile of Nehemiah Ordway at the [South Dakota Historical Society website]

Government offices
Preceded by Edward Ball	Sergeant at Arms of the United States House of Representatives; 1863–1875	Succeeded by John Thompson
Political offices
Preceded by William Alanson Howard	Governor of the Dakota Territory; 1880–1884	Succeeded by Gilbert A. Pierce
