= Walter A. Burleigh =

American politician

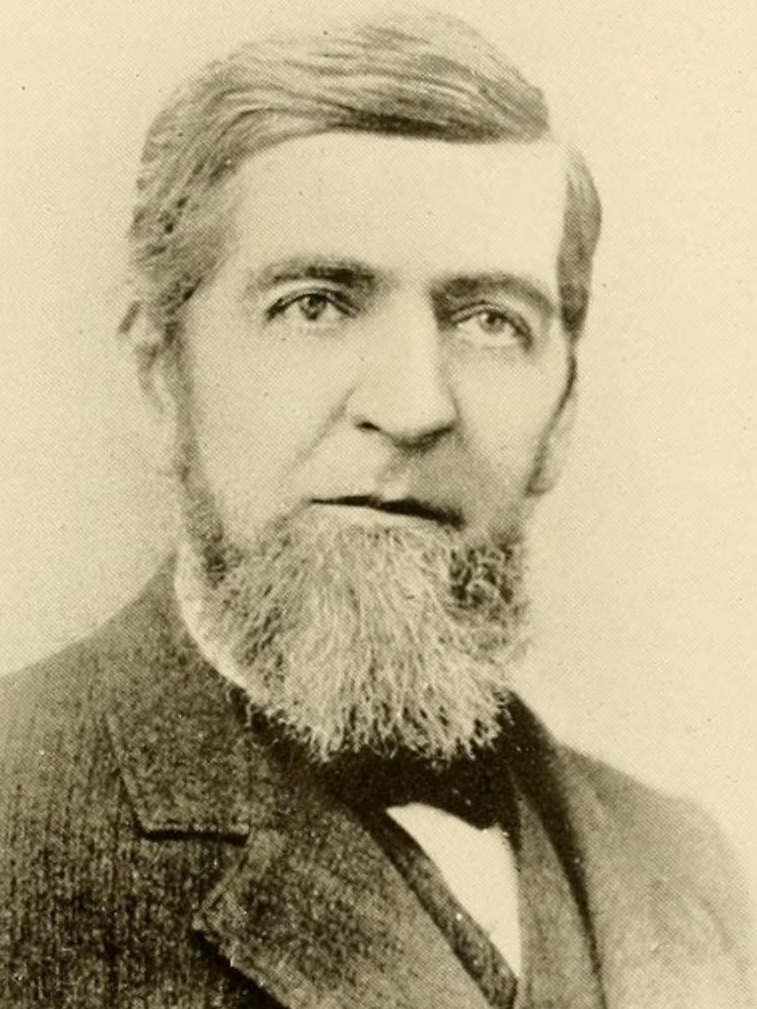
Walter A. Burleigh, Dakota Territory Congressman.

Signature of Burleigh

Walter Atwood Burleigh (October 25, 1820 – March 7, 1896) was an American physician, lawyer, and pioneer. He represented the Dakota Territory as a non-voting delegate to the United States House of Representatives.

== Biography ==
Walter was born in Waterville, Maine on October 25, 1820. He served in the Aroostook War in 1839, studied medicine in Burlington, Vermont and Manhattan, New York City, and began his practice in Richmond, Maine. In 1852 he moved to Kittanning, Pennsylvania. Then, around 1861, he became an Indian agent at Greenwood, Dakota Territory (in what is now the Yankton Sioux Reservation in Charles Mix County, South Dakota.

Some Yankton Sioux Indians complained bitterly of mistreatment by Burleigh. The testimony of Strike the Ree and Medicine Cow to a Special Joint Committee on the Condition of the Indian Tribes in 1865 suggests that Burleigh was self-serving and corrupt in his dealings with the Indians.

Burleigh was elected as a Republican to the House of Representatives, serving from March 4, 1865 – March 3, 1869. He was an unsuccessful candidate for reelection in 1868.

On March 31, 1868, Burleigh testified in the impeachment trial of President Andrew Johnson, having been called as a witness by the prosecution.

Burleigh was a member of the Dakota Territorial council in 1877, then worked as a contractor and in farming, and moved to Miles City, Montana 1879, where he practiced law.

He served as a member of the special session of the Montana Territorial council in 1887 and as a delegate to the convention that framed the constitution of Montana in 1889. He was a member of the first State House of Representatives, and served as prosecuting attorney of Custer County.

Burleigh returned to South Dakota in 1893, resumed the practice of law, and served in the South Dakota State Senate. He died in Yankton, Yankton County, South Dakota, and is buried in the Yankton Cemetery. Burleigh County, North Dakota is named for him.

U.S. House of Representatives
Preceded by John B.S. Todd	Delegate to the U.S. House of Representatives from Dakota Territory; March 4, 1865 – March 3, 1869	Succeeded by Solomon L. Spink
