= Dakota Territory =

United States territory (1861–1889)

Coordinates: 46°N 104°W

Territory of Dakota
- Organized incorporated territory of the United States
- 1861–1889
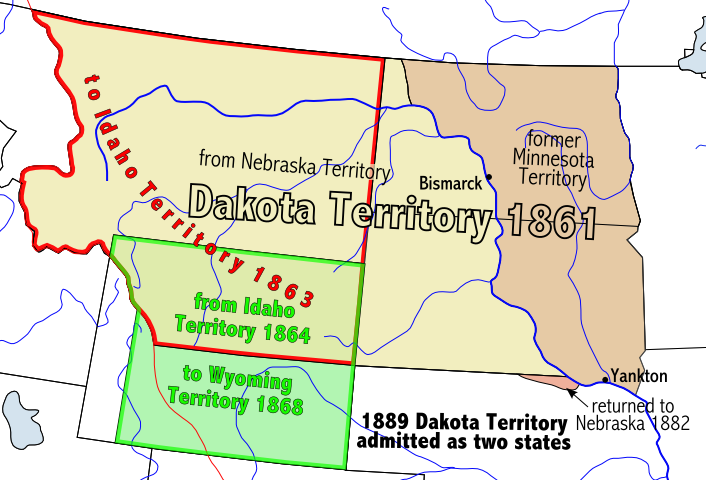
- Capital: Yankton (1861–1883); Bismarck (1883–1889)
  - Type: Organized incorporated territory
- History
  - Created from Nebraska and unorganized territories: 2 March 1861
  - Idaho Territory split off: March 4, 1863
  - Land received from Idaho Territory: May 28, 1864
  - Wyoming Territory split off: July 25, 1868
  - North Dakota and South Dakota statehood: 2 November 1889
Preceded by
Nebraska Territory
Unorganized territory
Succeeded by
Idaho Territory
Wyoming Territory
North Dakota
South Dakota

The Territory of Dakota was an organized incorporated territory of the United States that existed from March 2, 1861, until November 2, 1889, when the final extent of the reduced territory was split and admitted to the Union as the states of North and South Dakota.

== History ==
Historical population
Year	Pop.	±%
1860	4,837	—
1870	14,181	+193.2%
1880	158,724	+1019.3%
Source: 1860–1880 (includes both North Dakota and South Dakota;

The Dakota Territory consisted of the northernmost part of the land acquired in the Louisiana Purchase in 1803, as well as the southernmost part of Rupert's Land, which was acquired in 1818 when the boundary was changed to the 49th parallel. The name refers to the Dakota branch of the Sioux tribes which occupied the area at the time. Most of Dakota Territory was formerly part of the Minnesota and Nebraska territories.

When Minnesota became a state in 1858, the leftover area between the Missouri River and Minnesota's western boundary fell unorganized. When the Yankton Treaty was signed later that year, ceding much of what had been Sioux Indian land to the U.S. Government, early settlers formed a provisional government and unsuccessfully lobbied for United States territory status. Wilmot Wood Brookings was the provisional governor. The cities of Wilmot and Brookings as well as Brookings County are named for him. Three years later, President-elect Abraham Lincoln's cousin-in-law John Blair Smith Todd personally lobbied for territory status, and the U.S. Congress formally created Dakota Territory. It became an organized territory on March 2, 1861. Upon creation, Dakota Territory included much of present-day Montana and Wyoming as well as all of present-day North Dakota and South Dakota and a small portion of present-day Nebraska. President Lincoln appointed Dakota Territory's first governor, William Jayne, who was Lincoln's old friend and neighbor from Springfield, Illinois.

A small patch of land known as "Lost Dakota" existed as a remote exclave of Dakota Territory until it became part of Gallatin County, Montana Territory, in 1873.

All land north of the Keya Paha River (which includes most of Boyd County, Nebraska, and a smaller portion of neighboring Keya Paha County) was originally part of Dakota Territory, but was transferred to Nebraska in 1882.

== American Civil War ==
Dakota Territory was not directly involved in the American Civil War but did raise some troops to defend the settlements following the Dakota War of 1862 which triggered hostilities with the Sioux tribes of Dakota Territory. The Department of the Northwest sent expeditions into Dakota Territory in 1863, 1864 and 1865. It also established forts in Dakota Territory to protect the frontier settlements of the Territory, Iowa and Minnesota and the traffic along the Missouri River.

== Before statehood ==
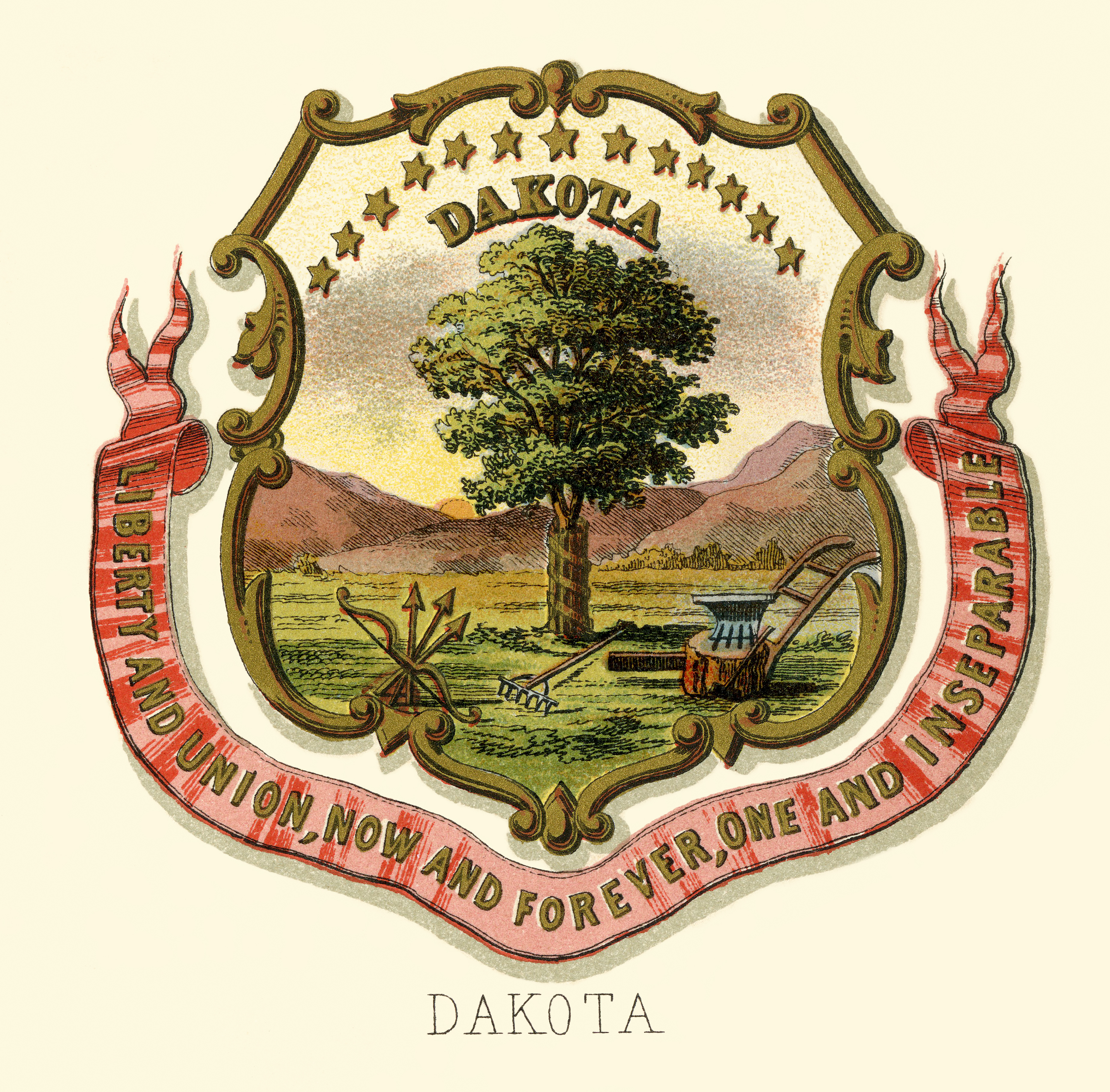
Historical coat of arms of the Dakota Territory, (Note: The territory's great seal was enacted by a law passed on January 3, 1863, with a design described as follows: A tree in the open field, the trunk of which is surrounded by a bundle of rods, bound with three bands; on the right plow, anvil, sledge, rake and fork; on the left, bow crossed with three arrows; Indian on horseback pursuing a buffalo toward the setting sun; foliage of the tree arched by half circle of thirteen stars, surrounded by the motto: "Liberty and Union, one and inseparable, now and forever", the words "Great Seal" at the top, and at the bottom, "Dakota Territory"; on the left, "March 2"; on the right, "1861". Seal 2 1/2 inches [64 mm] in diameter.) illustrated in 1876

Following the Civil War, hostilities continued with the Sioux until the 1868 Treaty of Fort Laramie. By 1868, creation of new territories reduced Dakota Territory to the present boundaries of the Dakotas. Territorial counties were defined in 1872, including Bottineau County, Cass County and others.

During the existence of the organized territory, the population first increased very slowly and then very rapidly with the "Dakota Boom" from 1870 to 1880. Because the Sioux were considered very hostile and a threat to early settlers, the white population grew slowly. Gradually, the settlers' population grew and the Sioux were not considered as severe a threat.

The population increase can largely be attributed to the growth of the Northern Pacific Railroad. Settlers who came to the Dakota Territory were from other western territories as well as many from northern and western Europe. These included large numbers of Norwegians, Germans, Swedes, and Canadians.

Commerce was originally organized around the fur trade. Furs were carried by steamboat along the rivers to the settlements. Gold was discovered in the Black Hills in 1874 and attracted more settlers, setting off the last Sioux War. The population surge increased the demand for meat spurring expanded cattle ranching on the territory's vast open ranges. With the advent of the railroad agriculture intensified: wheat became the territory's main cash crop. Economic hardship hit the territory in the 1880s due to lower wheat prices and a drought.

There are two conflicting narratives on why the Dakota Territory was divided and given statehood. One narrative suggests that it was due to regionalist tensions while the other suggests that it was a political play by Gilded Age Republicans.

=== Regionalist narrative ===
Regionalist tensions between the northern and the southern parts of the territory were present since the beginning. The southern part was always more populated, in the 1880 Census, the southern part had a population of 98,268, two and a half times the northern part's 36,909. The southern part also considered the north to be somewhat disreputable, "too much controlled by the wild folks, cattle ranchers, fur traders” and too frequently the site of conflict with the indigenous population. The railroad also connected the northern and southern parts to different hubs – the northern part, via Fargo and Bismarck became closer tied to the Minneapolis–Saint Paul area, while the southern part became closer tied to Sioux City and from there to Omaha.

Politically, territorial legislators were appointed by the federal government, and tended to remain in the region only while they served their terms. The larger population of the southern region began to resent them, while the northerners tended to emphasize that it was cheaper to be a territory, with the federal government funding a wide range of state functions.

The territorial governor Nehemiah G. Ordway moved the territorial capital from Yankton to Bismarck in 1883. The capital grab, which moved the capital away from the majority of the population fueled more resentment from the south.

The southern part was anxious for statehood so they could have their own capital. They had already crossed the 60,000 population necessary for statehood; so, they held a convention in September of 1883, drafted a state constitution, and submitted it to the voters. It was approved by the electors and submitted to Congress. A bill providing for statehood of the Dakota Territory south of the 46th parallel of latitude was passed by the Senate in December 1884, but failed to pass the House. A second constitutional convention for South Dakota was held in September 1885, framing a new constitution and submitted it to the vote of the people, who ratified it with an overwhelming vote.

Conventions favoring division of Dakota into two states were also held in the northern section, one in 1887 at Fargo, and another in 1888, at Jamestown. Both adopted provisions memorializing Congress to divide the territory and admit both North and South Dakota as states. Various bills were introduced in Congress on the matter; one in 1885 to admit South Dakota as a state, and organize the northern half as Lincoln Territory. Another bill introduced in 1886, proposed to admit the entire Territory as a single state. Still another provided for all of the Territory east of the Missouri River to become a single state, the balance to be organized as Lincoln or North Dakota Territory. Other bills were introduced in 1887 and 1888, but failed to pass. The Territorial Legislature of 1887 submitted the question of division to a popular vote at the general election of November 1887. When full returns of this election finally came in on January 10, 1888, 37,784 favored division and 32,913 were opposed.

=== Political play narrative ===
In 1889, Republican Benjamin Harrison became president of the United States and favoured statehood for Dakota. In order to become a state, a territory was required to have a population of at least 60,000. In 1889, southern Dakota had a population of over 340,000, and northern Dakota had a population of over 150,000 so Congress is said to have decided that it was finally time to grant statehood. But in reality, the Republican Party, which wanted more power in the U.S. Senate, put on pressure to divide Dakota into two states. With two senators from each state, the Republicans would gain four more senate seats in Congress. After defeating Democratic President Grover Cleveland in the 1888 election, they celebrated by splitting the Republican-dominated Dakota into two territories and admitting both of them as states. Today, there are still two Dakotas because Gilded Age Republicans wanted four senators instead of just two. In their eagerness to admit both Dakotas, congressmen also ignored that much of the land in the anticipated state of South Dakota belonged to the Sioux.

Perhaps, the capital change from Yankton to Bismarck can also be explained by the fact that Yankton was located in southern South Dakota on the territory's border with Nebraska while Bismarck, whose community had recently grown due to the arrival of the Transcontinental railway, had a relatively better central location near the Black Hills of South Dakota where recent gold discovery was a great impetus for growth and led it to becoming a freight-shipping centre on the "Custer Route" from the Black Hills.

Yankton's status as an important port was literally crushed on March 27, 1881, when an ice dam on the Missouri River burst, sending flood waters and giant blocks of ice flowing towards the town. The resulting flood waters continued to accumulate behind the debris, and by March 29, the town's riverfront and downtown were covered in water, ice and rock, destroying or stranding several riverboats that were moored there. As a result of this flood, and the expansion of railroads as a preferred method of shipping goods, Yankton's river boat traffic was reduced, and the city's role as a prominent stopping point on the way west dwindled over the next several years.

It was also not especially unusual for the party that controls Congress to admit states for political reasons. In 1864, Republican President Abraham Lincoln signed legislation admitting Nevada, a barely populated desert state with a few thousand residents, into the union as a state. The few people who did live there were overwhelmingly Republican. A dozen years later, President Ulysses Grant, also a Republican, signed legislation admitting Republican-dominated Colorado as a state even though according to the then latest census, Colorado had fewer than 40,000 residents. Republicans also successfully blocked New Mexico from becoming a state until 1912 while Cleveland’s Democrats had hoped to admit New Mexico as it would have favored them.

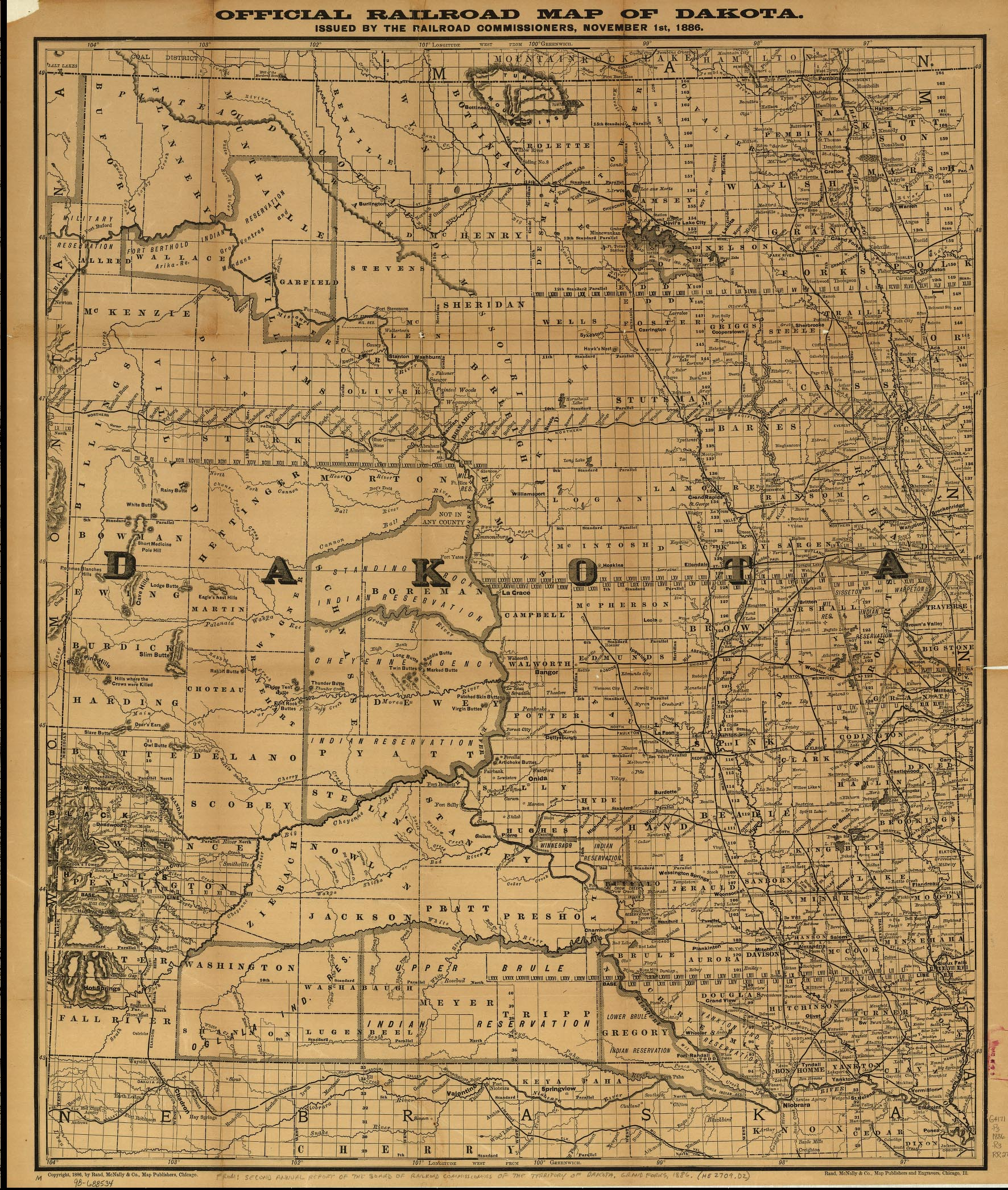
Map of the Dakota Territory, c. 1886

=== Admission ===
The admission of new western states was a party political battleground, with each party looking at how the proposed new states were likely to vote. At the beginning of 1888, the Democrats under president Grover Cleveland proposed that the four territories of Montana, New Mexico, Dakota and Washington should be admitted together. The first two were expected to vote Democratic and the latter two were expected to vote Republican so this was seen as a compromise acceptable to both parties. However, the Republicans won majorities in both the House and the Senate later that year. To head off the possibility that Congress might only admit Republican territories to statehood, the Democrats agreed to a less favorable deal in which Dakota was divided in two and New Mexico was left out altogether. Cleveland signed it into law on February 22, 1889, and the territories could become states nine months after that.

=== Sioux dispute ===
There had been previous attempts to open up the territory, but these had foundered because the Treaty of Fort Laramie (1868) required that 75 percent of Sioux adult males on the reservation had to agree to any treaty change. Most recently, a commission headed by Richard Henry Pratt in 1888 had completely failed to get the necessary signatures in the face of opposition from Sioux leaders and even government worker Elaine Goodale, later Superintendent of Indian Education for the Dakotas. The government believed that the Dawes Act (1887), which attempted to move the Indians from hunting to farming, in theory, meant that they needed less land (but in reality was an economic disaster for them) and that at least half was available for sale. Congress approved an offer of $1.25 per acre ($3.1/ha) for reservation land (a figure they had previously rejected as outrageously high) and $25,000 to induce the Indians to sign.

A new commission was appointed in April 1889 that included veteran Indian fighter general George Crook. Crook pulled out all the stops to get the Indians to sign, using many underhand tactics. He threatened them that if they did not sign, the land would be taken anyway and they would get nothing. This would not have been seen as an idle threat; the treaty had been ignored in the past when the Black Hills were taken from the Sioux. Crook ignored leaders like Sitting Bull and Red Cloud who opposed the sale and kept them out of the negotiations, preferring instead to deal with moderate leaders like American Horse. American Horse, however, claimed immediately afterwards that he had been tricked into signing. Crook made many personal promises (such as on reservation rations) which he had no authority to make, or ability to keep. He claimed afterwards that he had only agreed to report the concerns back to Washington. Crook lied about how many signatures he already had, giving the impression that the signature he was currently asking for would make no difference. He said that those who did not sign would not get a share of the money for the land. Crook even allowed white men who had married Sioux to sign, a dubious action given that the blood quantum laws only counted full-blood Indians as members of the tribe. By August 6, 1889, Crook had the requisite number of signatures, half the reservation land was sold, and the remainder divided among six smaller reservations.

== Statehood ==
On February 22, 1889, outgoing President Cleveland signed an omnibus bill that divided the Territory of Dakota in half. North Dakota and South Dakota became states simultaneously on November 2, 1889. President Harrison had the papers shuffled to obscure which one was signed first and the order went unrecorded. The bill also enabled the people in the new Territories of North Dakota and South Dakota, as well as the older territories of Montana and Washington, to write state constitutions and elect state governments. The four new states would be admitted into the Union in nine months. This plan cut Democratic New Mexico out of statehood and split Republican Dakota Territory into two new Republican states. Rather than two new Republican states and two new Democratic states that Congress had considered the previous year, the omnibus bill created three new Republican states and one new Democratic state that Republicans thought they would capture.

== See also ==
- Bibliography of North Dakota history
- Bibliography of South Dakota history
- List of governors of Dakota Territory
- American frontier
- Historic regions of the United States
- History of North Dakota
- History of South Dakota
- List of Dakota Territory Civil War units
- Territorial evolution of the United States
- Dakota Territory's at-large congressional district
- Railroad land grants in the United States#Northern Pacific

== Sources ==
- Karolevitz, Robert F. (1972). Yankton: A Pioneer Past. Aberdeen, SD: North Plains Press. pp. 40–41.. U.S. Library of Congress Number 72-88949
