= 51st United States Congress =

1889-1891 U.S. Congress

| ← | 50th | 52nd | → |
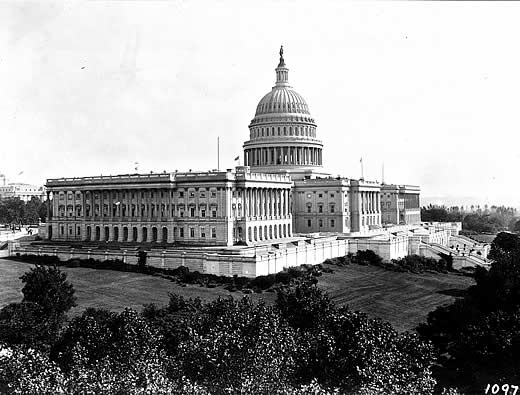
- United States Capitol (1906)

Overview
- Legislative body: United States Congress
- Jurisdiction: United States
- Term: March 4, 1889 – March 4, 1891

Senate
- Members: 88
- President: Levi P. Morton (R)
- President pro tempore: John J. Ingalls (R)
- Party control: Republican

House of Representatives
- Members: 332 representatives 9 non-voting delegates
- Speaker: Thomas B. Reed (R)
- Party control: Republican

Sessions
- Special (Note: Special session of the Senate.): March 4, 1889 – April 2, 1889
- 1st: December 2, 1889 – October 1, 1890
- 2nd: December 1, 1890 – March 3, 1891

The 51st United States Congress, referred to by some critics as the Billion Dollar Congress, was a meeting of the legislative branch of the United States federal government, consisting of the United States Senate and the United States House of Representatives. It met in Washington, D.C., from March 4, 1889, to March 4, 1891, during the first two years of Benjamin Harrison's presidency.

The apportionment of seats in this House of Representatives was based on the 1880 United States census.

The Republicans maintained their majority in the Senate, and won the majority in the House. With Benjamin Harrison being sworn in as president on March 4, 1889, this gave the Republicans an overall federal government trifecta for the first time since the 43rd Congress in 1873–1875.

== Major events ==
- March 4, 1889: Benjamin Harrison became President of the United States
- December 29, 1890: Wounded Knee Massacre

== Major legislation ==
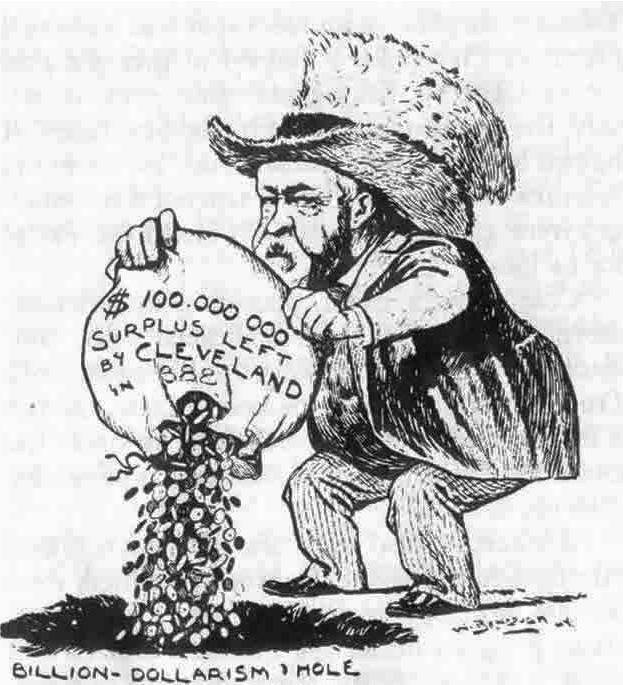
Benjamin Harrison and the Congress are portrayed as a "Billion-Dollar Congress," wasting the surplus in this cartoon from Puck.

It was responsible for a number of pieces of landmark legislation, many of which asserted the authority of the federal government.

Emboldened by their success in the elections of 1888, the Republicans enacted virtually their entire platform during their first 303-day session, including a measure that provided American Civil War veterans with generous pensions and expanded the list of eligible recipients to include noncombatants and the children of veterans. Grover Cleveland had vetoed a similar bill in 1887. It was criticized as the "Billion Dollar Congress'" for its lavish spending and, for this reason it incited drastic reversals in public support that led to Cleveland's reelection in 1892.

Other important legislation passed into law by the Congress included the McKinley tariff, authored by Representative, and future President, William McKinley; the Sherman Antitrust Act, which prohibited business combinations that restricted trade; and the Sherman Silver Purchase Act, which required the U.S. government to mint silver. The last two were concessions to Western farmer interests in exchange for support of the tariff and would become central tenets of the Populist Party later in the decade. They were authored by Senator John Sherman.

The Fifty-first Congress was also responsible for passing the Land Revision Act of 1891, which created the national forests. Harrison authorized America's first forest reserve in Yellowstone, Wyoming, the same year.

Other bills were discussed but failed to pass, including two significant pieces of legislation focused on ensuring African Americans the right to vote. Henry Cabot Lodge sponsored a so-called Lodge Bill that would have established federal supervision of Congressional elections so as to prevent the disfranchisement of southern blacks. Henry W. Blair sponsored the Blair Education Bill, which advocated the use of federal aid for education in order to frustrate southern whites employing literacy tests to prevent blacks from registering to vote.

- June 27, 1890: Dependent Pension Act
- July 2, 1890: Sherman Antitrust Act, ch. 647, 26 Stat. 209
- July 14, 1890: Sherman Silver Purchase Act, ch. 708, 26 Stat. 289
- August 30, 1890: Morrill Land-Grant Colleges Act
- October 1, 1890: McKinley Tariff, ch. 1244, 26 Stat. 567
- March 3, 1891: Forest Reserve Act of 1891
- March 3, 1891: Land Revision Act of 1891
- March 3, 1891: Immigration Act of 1891
- March 3, 1891: Merchant Marine Act of 1891
- March 3, 1891: International Copyright Act (The Chace Act)

== States admitted and territories organized ==
- November 2, 1889: North Dakota and South Dakota were admitted as the 39th and 40th states.
- November 8, 1889: Montana was admitted as the 41st state.
- November 11, 1889: Washington was admitted as the 42nd state.
- May 2, 1890: Oklahoma Territory was organized.
- July 3, 1890: Idaho was admitted as the 43rd state.
- July 10, 1890: Wyoming was admitted as the 44th state.

== Party summary ==
The count below identifies party affiliations at the beginning of this Congress. Changes resulting from subsequent replacements are shown below in the "Changes in membership" section.

Six new states were admitted during this Congress, and their senators and representatives were elected throughout the Congress.

=== Senate ===
| | Party (shading shows control) | | | Total | Vacant |
| | Democratic (D) | Republican (R) | Other | Total | Vacant |
|---|---|---|---|---|---|
| End of previous congress | 37 | 38 | 1 (Note: Readjuster) | 76 | 0 |
| Begin | 37 | 39 | 0 | 76 | 0 |
| End | 35 | 51 | 0 | 86 | 2 |
| Final voting share | 40.7% | 59.3% | 0.0% | | |
| Beginning of next congress | 36 | 46 | 2 (Note: Populist) | 84 | 4 |

=== House of Representatives ===
| | Party (shading shows control) | | | | Total | Vacant |
| | Democratic (D) | Labor (L) | Republican (R) | Other | Total | Vacant |
|---|---|---|---|---|---|---|
| End of previous congress | 167 | 2 | 152 | 4 (Note: Independent Republican, Greenback, Independent) | 325 | 0 |
| Begin | 160 | 0 | 164 | 0 | 324 | 1 |
| End | 153 | 1 | 176 | 0 | 330 | 2 |
| Final voting share | 46.4% | 0.3% | 53.3% | 0.0% | | |
| Beginning of next congress | 238 | 0 | 86 | 8 (Note: Populist) | 332 | 0 |

== Leadership ==
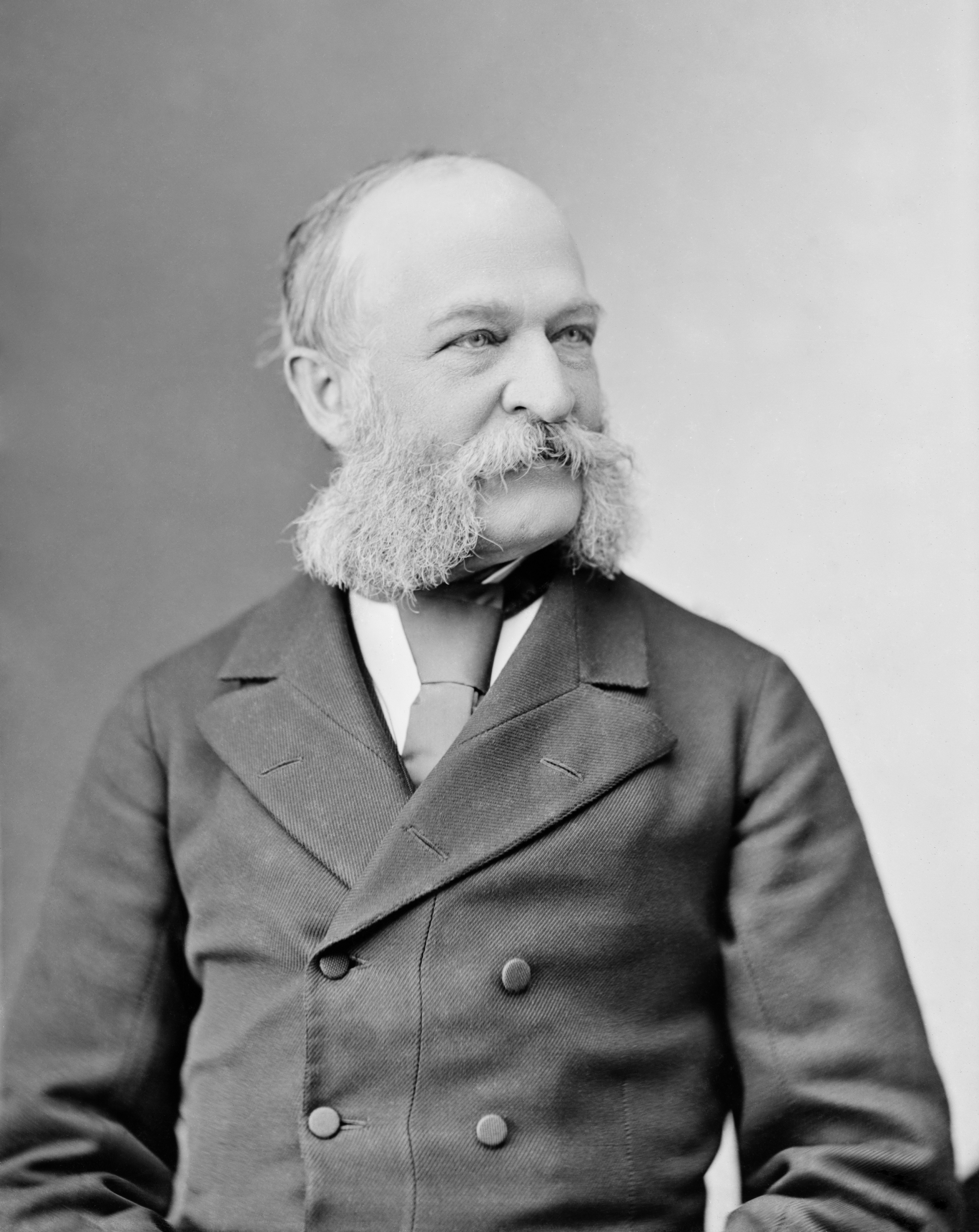
President of the Senate Levi P. Morton

=== Senate ===
- President: Levi P. Morton (R)
- President pro tempore: John J. Ingalls (R), elected March 7, 1889
  - Charles F. Manderson (R), elected March 2, 1891
- Republican Conference Chairman: George F. Edmunds
- Democratic Caucus Chairman: James B. Beck, until May 3, 1890
  - Arthur P. Gorman, afterwards

=== House of Representatives ===
- Speaker: Thomas B. Reed (R)
- Republican Conference Chairman: Thomas J. Henderson
- Democratic Caucus Chairman: William S. Holman
- Democratic Campaign Committee Chairman: James T. Jones

== Members ==
This list is arranged by chamber, then by state. Senators are listed by class, and representatives are listed by district.

Skip to House of Representatives, below

=== Senate ===
Senators were elected by the state legislatures every two years, with one-third beginning new six-year terms with each Congress. Preceding the names in the list below are Senate class numbers, which indicate the cycle of their election. In this Congress, Class 1 meant their term began in the last Congress, requiring reelection in 1892; Class 2 meant their term began in this Congress, requiring reelection in 1894; and Class 3 meant their term ended in this Congress, requiring reelection in 1890.

==== Alabama ====
▌2. John T. Morgan (D)
▌3. James L. Pugh (D)

==== Arkansas ====
▌2. James H. Berry (D)
▌3. James K. Jones (D)

==== California ====
▌1. George Hearst (D), until February 28, 1891
▌3. Leland Stanford (R)

==== Colorado ====
▌2. Edward O. Wolcott (R)
▌3. Henry M. Teller (R)

==== Connecticut ====
▌1. Joseph R. Hawley (R)
▌3. Orville H. Platt (R)

==== Delaware ====
▌1. George Gray (D)
▌2. Anthony Higgins (R)

==== Florida ====
▌1. Samuel Pasco (D)
▌3. Wilkinson Call (D)

==== Georgia ====
▌2. Alfred H. Colquitt (D)
▌3. Joseph E. Brown (D)

==== Idaho ====
▌2. George L. Shoup (R), from December 18, 1890
▌3. William J. McConnell (R), from December 18, 1890

==== Illinois ====
▌2. Shelby M. Cullom (R)
▌3. Charles B. Farwell (R)

==== Indiana ====
▌1. David Turpie (D)
▌3. Daniel W. Voorhees (D)

==== Iowa ====
▌2. James F. Wilson (R)
▌3. William B. Allison (R)

==== Kansas ====
▌2. Preston B. Plumb (R)
▌3. John J. Ingalls (R)

==== Kentucky ====
▌2. James B. Beck (D), until May 3, 1890

▌John G. Carlisle (D), from May 26, 1890

▌3. Joseph C. S. Blackburn (D)

==== Louisiana ====
▌2. Randall L. Gibson (D)
▌3. James B. Eustis (D)

==== Maine ====
▌1. Eugene Hale (R)
▌2. William P. Frye (R)

==== Maryland ====
▌1. Arthur Pue Gorman (D)
▌3. Ephraim K. Wilson II (D), until February 24, 1891

==== Massachusetts ====
▌1. Henry L. Dawes (R)
▌2. George F. Hoar (R)

==== Michigan ====
▌1. Francis B. Stockbridge (R)
▌2. James McMillan (R)

==== Minnesota ====
▌1. Cushman K. Davis (R)
▌2. William D. Washburn (R)

==== Mississippi ====
▌1. James Z. George (D)
▌2. Edward C. Walthall (D)

==== Missouri ====
▌1. Francis Cockrell (D)
▌3. George G. Vest (D)

==== Montana ====
▌1. Wilbur F. Sanders (R), from January 1, 1890
▌2. Thomas C. Power (R), from January 2, 1890

==== Nebraska ====
▌1. Algernon S. Paddock (R)
▌2. Charles F. Manderson (R)

==== Nevada ====
▌1. William M. Stewart (R)
▌3. John P. Jones (R)

==== New Hampshire ====
▌2. Gilman Marston (R), until June 18, 1889

▌William E. Chandler (R), from June 18, 1889

▌3. Henry W. Blair (R)

==== New Jersey ====
▌1. Rufus Blodgett (D)
▌2. John R. McPherson (D)

==== New York ====
▌1. Frank Hiscock (R)
▌3. William M. Evarts (R)

==== North Carolina ====
▌2. Matt W. Ransom (D)
▌3. Zebulon B. Vance (D)

==== North Dakota ====
▌1. Lyman R. Casey (R), from November 25, 1889
▌3. Gilbert A. Pierce (R), from November 25, 1889

==== Ohio ====
▌1. John Sherman (R)
▌3. Henry B. Payne (D)

==== Oregon ====
▌2. Joseph N. Dolph (R)
▌3. John H. Mitchell (R)

==== Pennsylvania ====
▌1. Matthew S. Quay (R)
▌3. J. Donald Cameron (R)

==== Rhode Island ====
▌1. Nelson W. Aldrich (R)
▌2. Jonathan Chace (R), until April 9, 1889

▌Nathan F. Dixon III (R), from April 10, 1889

==== South Carolina ====
▌2. Matthew C. Butler (D)
▌3. Wade Hampton III (D)

==== South Dakota ====
▌2. Richard F. Pettigrew (R), from November 2, 1889
▌3. Gideon C. Moody (R), from November 2, 1889

==== Tennessee ====
▌1. William B. Bate (D)
▌2. Isham G. Harris (D)

==== Texas ====
▌1. John H. Reagan (D)
▌2. Richard Coke (D)

==== Vermont ====
▌1. George F. Edmunds (R)
▌3. Justin S. Morrill (R)

==== Virginia ====
▌1. John W. Daniel (D)
▌2. John S. Barbour Jr. (D)

==== Washington ====
▌1. John B. Allen (R), from November 20, 1889
▌3. Watson C. Squire (R), from November 20, 1889

==== West Virginia ====
▌1. Charles J. Faulkner Jr. (D)
▌2. John E. Kenna (D)

==== Wisconsin ====
▌1. Philetus Sawyer (R)
▌3. John C. Spooner (R)

==== Wyoming ====
▌1. Francis E. Warren (R), from November 24, 1890
▌2. Joseph M. Carey (R), from November 15, 1890

Senators' party membership by state at the opening of the 51st Congress in March 1889. The senators from Idaho, Montana, North Dakota, South Dakota, Washington, and Wyoming were not seated until later in the Congress. 2 Democrats 1 Democrat and 1 Republican 2 Republicans Territories

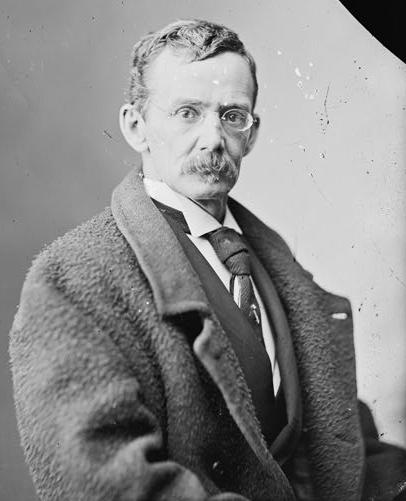
President pro tempore John J. Ingalls

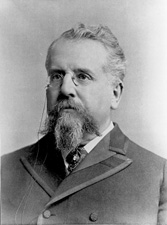
President pro tempore Charles F. Manderson

=== House of Representatives ===
The names of representatives are preceded by their district numbers.

==== Alabama ====
▌1. Richard H. Clarke (D)
▌2. Hilary A. Herbert (D)
▌3. William C. Oates (D)
▌4. Louis W. Turpin (D), until June 4, 1890

▌John V. McDuffie (R), from June 4, 1890

▌5. James E. Cobb (D)
▌6. John H. Bankhead (D)
▌7. William H. Forney (D)
▌8. Joseph Wheeler (D)

==== Arkansas ====
▌1. William H. Cate (D), until March 5, 1890

▌Lewis P. Featherstone (L), from March 5, 1890

▌2. Clifton R. Breckinridge (D), until September 5, 1890

▌Clifton R. Breckinridge (D), from November 4, 1890

▌3. Thomas C. McRae (D)
▌4. John H. Rogers (D)
▌5. Samuel W. Peel (D)

==== California ====
▌1. John J. De Haven (R), until October 1, 1890

▌Thomas J. Geary (D), from December 9, 1890

▌2. Marion Biggs (D)
▌3. Joseph McKenna (R)
▌4. William W. Morrow (R)
▌5. Thomas J. Clunie (D)
▌6. William Vandever (R)

==== Colorado ====
▌At-large. Hosea Townsend (R)

==== Connecticut ====
▌1. William E. Simonds (R)
▌2. Washington F. Willcox (D)
▌3. Charles A. Russell (R)
▌4. Frederick Miles (R)

==== Delaware ====
▌At-large. John B. Penington (D)

==== Florida ====
▌1. Robert H. M. Davidson (D)
▌2. Robert Bullock (D)

==== Georgia ====
▌1. Rufus E. Lester (D)
▌2. Henry G. Turner (D)
▌3. Charles F. Crisp (D)
▌4. Thomas W. Grimes (D)
▌5. John D. Stewart (D)
▌6. James H. Blount (D)
▌7. Judson C. Clements (D)
▌8. Henry H. Carlton (D)
▌9. Allen D. Candler (D)
▌10. George T. Barnes (D)

==== Idaho ====
▌At-large. Willis Sweet (R), from October 1, 1890

==== Illinois ====
▌1. Abner Taylor (R)
▌2. Frank Lawler (D)
▌3. William E. Mason (R)
▌4. George E. Adams (R)
▌5. Albert J. Hopkins (R)
▌6. Robert R. Hitt (R)
▌7. Thomas J. Henderson (R)
▌8. Charles A. Hill (R)
▌9. Lewis E. Payson (R)
▌10. Philip S. Post (R)
▌11. William H. Gest (R)
▌12. Scott Wike (D)
▌13. William M. Springer (D)
▌14. Jonathan H. Rowell (R)
▌15. Joseph G. Cannon (R)
▌16. George W. Fithian (D)
▌17. Edward Lane (D)
▌18. William S. Forman (D)
▌19. Richard W. Townshend (D), until March 9, 1889

▌James R. Williams (D), from December 2, 1889

▌20. George Washington Smith (R)

==== Indiana ====
▌1. William F. Parrett (D)
▌2. John H. O'Neall (D)
▌3. Jason B. Brown (D)
▌4. William S. Holman (D)
▌5. George W. Cooper (D)
▌6. Thomas M. Browne (R)
▌7. William D. Bynum (D)
▌8. Elijah V. Brookshire (D)
▌9. Joseph B. Cheadle (R)
▌10. William D. Owen (R)
▌11. Augustus N. Martin (D)
▌12. Charles A. O. McClellan (D)
▌13. Benjamin F. Shively (D)

==== Iowa ====
▌1. John H. Gear (R)
▌2. Walter I. Hayes (D)
▌3. David B. Henderson (R)
▌4. Joseph H. Sweney (R)
▌5. Daniel Kerr (R)
▌6. John F. Lacey (R)
▌7. Edwin H. Conger (R), until October 3, 1890

▌Edward R. Hays (R), from November 4, 1890

▌8. James P. Flick (R)
▌9. Joseph R. Reed (R)
▌10. Jonathan P. Dolliver (R)
▌11. Isaac S. Struble (R)

==== Kansas ====
▌1. Edmund N. Morrill (R)
▌2. Edward H. Funston (R)
▌3. Bishop W. Perkins (R)
▌4. Thomas Ryan (R), until April 4, 1889

▌Harrison Kelley (R), from December 2, 1889

▌5. John A. Anderson (R)
▌6. Erastus J. Turner (R)
▌7. Samuel R. Peters (R)

==== Kentucky ====
▌1. William J. Stone (D)
▌2. William T. Ellis (D)
▌3. Isaac H. Goodnight (D)
▌4. Alexander B. Montgomery (D)
▌5. Asher G. Caruth (D)
▌6. John G. Carlisle (D), until May 26, 1890

▌William W. Dickerson (D), from June 21, 1890

▌7. William C. P. Breckinridge (D)
▌8. James B. McCreary (D)
▌9. Thomas H. Paynter (D)
▌10. John H. Wilson (R)
▌11. Hugh F. Finley (R)

==== Louisiana ====
▌1. Theodore S. Wilkinson (D)
▌2. Hamilton D. Coleman (R)
▌3. Edward J. Gay (D), until May 30, 1889

▌Andrew Price (D), from December 2, 1889

▌4. Newton C. Blanchard (D)
▌5. Charles J. Boatner (D)
▌6. Samuel M. Robertson (D)

==== Maine ====
▌1. Thomas B. Reed (R)
▌2. Nelson Dingley Jr. (R)
▌3. Seth L. Milliken (R)
▌4. Charles A. Boutelle (R)

==== Maryland ====
▌1. Charles H. Gibson (D)
▌2. Herman Stump (D)
▌3. Henry W. Rusk (D)
▌4. Henry J. Stockbridge Jr. (R)
▌5. Barnes Compton (D), until March 20, 1890

▌Sydney E. Mudd (R), from March 20, 1890

▌6. Louis E. McComas (R)

==== Massachusetts ====
▌1. Charles S. Randall (R)
▌2. Elijah A. Morse (R)
▌3. John F. Andrew (D)
▌4. Joseph H. O'Neil (D)
▌5. Nathaniel P. Banks (R)
▌6. Henry Cabot Lodge (R)
▌7. William Cogswell (R)
▌8. Frederic T. Greenhalge (R)
▌9. John W. Candler (R)
▌10. Joseph H. Walker (R)
▌11. Rodney Wallace (R)
▌12. Francis W. Rockwell (R)

==== Michigan ====
▌1. J. Logan Chipman (D)
▌2. Edward P. Allen (R)
▌3. James O'Donnell (R)
▌4. Julius C. Burrows (R)
▌5. Charles E. Belknap (R)
▌6. Mark S. Brewer (R)
▌7. Justin R. Whiting (D)
▌8. Aaron T. Bliss (R)
▌9. Byron M. Cutcheon (R)
▌10. Frank W. Wheeler (R)
▌11. Samuel M. Stephenson (R)

==== Minnesota ====
▌1. Mark H. Dunnell (R)
▌2. John Lind (R)
▌3. Darwin S. Hall (R)
▌4. Samuel P. Snider (R)
▌5. Solomon G. Comstock (R)

==== Mississippi ====
▌1. John M. Allen (D)
▌2. James B. Morgan (D)
▌3. Thomas C. Catchings (D)
▌4. Clarke Lewis (D)
▌5. Chapman L. Anderson (D)
▌6. Thomas R. Stockdale (D)
▌7. Charles E. Hooker (D)

==== Missouri ====
▌1. William H. Hatch (D)
▌2. Charles H. Mansur (D)
▌3. Alexander M. Dockery (D)
▌4. Robert P. C. Wilson (D), from December 2, 1889
▌5. John C. Tarsney (D)
▌6. John T. Heard (D)
▌7. Richard H. Norton (D)
▌8. Frederick G. Niedringhaus (R)
▌9. Nathan Frank (R)
▌10. William M. Kinsey (R)
▌11. Richard P. Bland (D)
▌12. William J. Stone (D)
▌13. William H. Wade (R)
▌14. James P. Walker (D), until July 19, 1890

▌Robert H. Whitelaw (D), from November 4, 1890

==== Montana ====
▌At-large. Thomas H. Carter (R), from November 8, 1889

==== Nebraska ====
▌1. William J. Connell (R)
▌2. James Laird (R), until August 17, 1889

▌Gilbert L. Laws (R), from December 2, 1889

▌3. George W. E. Dorsey (R)

==== Nevada ====
▌At-large. Horace F. Bartine (R)

==== New Hampshire ====
▌1. Alonzo Nute (R)
▌2. Orren C. Moore (R)

==== New Jersey ====
▌1. Christopher A. Bergen (R)
▌2. James Buchanan (R)
▌3. Jacob A. Geissenhainer (D)
▌4. Samuel Fowler (D)
▌5. Charles D. Beckwith (R)
▌6. Herman Lehlbach (R)
▌7. William McAdoo (D)

==== New York ====
▌1. James W. Covert (D)
▌2. Felix Campbell (D)
▌3. William C. Wallace (R)
▌4. John M. Clancy (D)
▌5. Thomas F. Magner (D)
▌6. Frank T. Fitzgerald (D), until November 4, 1889

▌Charles H. Turner (D), from December 9, 1889

▌7. Edward J. Dunphy (D)
▌8. John H. McCarthy (D), until January 14, 1891, vacant thereafter
▌9. Samuel S. Cox (D), until September 10, 1889

▌Amos J. Cummings (D), from November 5, 1889

▌10. Francis B. Spinola (D)
▌11. John Quinn (D)
▌12. Roswell P. Flower (D)
▌13. Ashbel P. Fitch (D)
▌14. William G. Stahlnecker (D)
▌15. Moses D. Stivers (R)
▌16. John H. Ketcham (R)
▌17. Charles J. Knapp (R)
▌18. John A. Quackenbush (R)
▌19. Charles Tracey (D)
▌20. John Sanford (R)
▌21. John H. Moffitt (R)
▌22. Frederick Lansing (R)
▌23. James S. Sherman (R)
▌24. David Wilber (R), until April 1, 1890

▌John S. Pindar (D), from November 4, 1890

▌25. James J. Belden (R)
▌26. Milton De Lano (R)
▌27. Newton W. Nutting (R), until October 15, 1889

▌Sereno E. Payne (R), from December 2, 1889

▌28. Thomas S. Flood (R)
▌29. John Raines (R)
▌30. Charles S. Baker (R)
▌31. John G. Sawyer (R)
▌32. John M. Farquhar (R)
▌33. John McClure Wiley (D)
▌34. William G. Laidlaw (R)

==== North Carolina ====
▌1. Thomas G. Skinner (D)
▌2. Henry P. Cheatham (R)
▌3. Charles W. McClammy (D)
▌4. Benjamin H. Bunn (D)
▌5. John M. Brower (R)
▌6. Alfred Rowland (D)
▌7. John S. Henderson (D)
▌8. William H. H. Cowles (D)
▌9. Hamilton G. Ewart (R)

==== North Dakota ====
▌At-large. Henry C. Hansbrough (R), from November 2, 1889

==== Ohio ====
▌1. Benjamin Butterworth (R)
▌2. John A. Caldwell (R)
▌3. Elihu S. Williams (R)
▌4. Samuel S. Yoder (D)
▌5. George E. Seney (D)
▌6. Melvin M. Boothman (R)
▌7. Henry L. Morey (R)
▌8. Robert P. Kennedy (R)
▌9. William C. Cooper (R)
▌10. William E. Haynes (D)
▌11. Albert C. Thompson (R)
▌12. Jacob J. Pugsley (R)
▌13. Joseph H. Outhwaite (D)
▌14. Charles P. Wickham (R)
▌15. Charles H. Grosvenor (R)
▌16. James W. Owens (D)
▌17. Joseph D. Taylor (R)
▌18. William McKinley (R)
▌19. Ezra B. Taylor (R)
▌20. Martin L. Smyser (R)
▌21. Theodore E. Burton (R)

==== Oregon ====
▌At-large. Binger Hermann (R)

==== Pennsylvania ====
▌1. Henry H. Bingham (R)
▌2. Charles O'Neill (R)
▌3. Samuel J. Randall (D), until April 13, 1890

▌Richard Vaux (D), from May 20, 1890

▌4. William D. Kelley (R), until January 9, 1890

▌John E. Reyburn (R), from February 18, 1890

▌5. Alfred C. Harmer (R)
▌6. Smedley Darlington (R)
▌7. Robert M. Yardley (R)
▌8. William Mutchler (D)
▌9. David B. Brunner (D)
▌10. Marriott Brosius (R)
▌11. Joseph A. Scranton (R)
▌12. Edwin S. Osborne (R)
▌13. James B. Reilly (D)
▌14. John W. Rife (R)
▌15. Myron B. Wright (R)
▌16. Henry C. McCormick (R)
▌17. Charles R. Buckalew (D)
▌18. Louis E. Atkinson (R)
▌19. Levi Maish (D)
▌20. Edward Scull (R)
▌21. Samuel A. Craig (R)
▌22. John Dalzell (R)
▌23. Thomas M. Bayne (R)
▌24. Joseph W. Ray (R)
▌25. Charles C. Townsend (R)
▌26. William C. Culbertson (R)
▌27. Lewis F. Watson (R), until August 25, 1890

▌Charles W. Stone (R), from November 4, 1890

▌28. James Kerr (D)

==== Rhode Island ====
▌1. Henry J. Spooner (R)
▌2. Warren O. Arnold (R)

==== South Carolina ====
▌1. Samuel Dibble (D)
▌2. George D. Tillman (D)
▌3. James S. Cothran (D)
▌4. William H. Perry (D)
▌5. John J. Hemphill (D)
▌6. George W. Dargan (D)
▌7. William Elliott (D), until September 23, 1890

▌Thomas E. Miller (R), from September 24, 1890

==== South Dakota ====
Both representatives were elected statewide on a general ticket.
(2 Republicans)

▌At-large. Oscar S. Gifford (R), from November 2, 1889
▌At-large. John A. Pickler (R), from November 2, 1889

==== Tennessee ====
▌1. Alfred A. Taylor (R)
▌2. Leonidas C. Houk (R)
▌3. Henry Clay Evans (R)
▌4. Benton McMillin (D)
▌5. James D. Richardson (D)
▌6. Joseph E. Washington (D)
▌7. Washington C. Whitthorne (D)
▌8. Benjamin A. Enloe (D)
▌9. Rice A. Pierce (D)
▌10. James Phelan Jr. (D), until January 30, 1891, vacant thereafter

==== Texas ====
▌1. Charles Stewart (D)
▌2. William H. Martin (D)
▌3. Constantine B. Kilgore (D)
▌4. David B. Culberson (D)
▌5. Silas Hare (D)
▌6. Joseph Abbott (D)
▌7. William H. Crain (D)
▌8. Littleton W. Moore (D)
▌9. Roger Q. Mills (D)
▌10. Joseph D. Sayers (D)
▌11. Samuel W. T. Lanham (D)

==== Vermont ====
▌1. John W. Stewart (R)
▌2. William W. Grout (R)

==== Virginia ====
▌1. Thomas H. B. Browne (R)
▌2. George E. Bowden (R)
▌3. George D. Wise (D), until April 10, 1890

▌Edmund Waddill Jr. (R), from April 12, 1890

▌4. Edward C. Venable (D), until September 23, 1890

▌John M. Langston (R), from September 23, 1890

▌5. Posey G. Lester (D)
▌6. Paul C. Edmunds (D)
▌7. Charles T. O'Ferrall (D)
▌8. William H. F. Lee (D)
▌9. John A. Buchanan (D)
▌10. Henry St. George Tucker III (D)

==== Washington ====
▌At-large. John L. Wilson (R), from November 20, 1889

==== West Virginia ====
▌1. John O. Pendleton (D), until February 26, 1890

▌George W. Atkinson (R), from February 26, 1890

▌2. William L. Wilson (D)
▌3. John D. Alderson (D)
▌4. James M. Jackson (D), until February 3, 1890

▌Charles B. Smith (R), from February 3, 1890

==== Wisconsin ====
▌1. Lucien B. Caswell (R)
▌2. Charles Barwig (D)
▌3. Robert M. La Follette Sr. (R)
▌4. Isaac W. Van Schaick (R)
▌5. George H. Brickner (D)
▌6. Charles B. Clark (R)
▌7. Ormsby B. Thomas (R)
▌8. Nils P. Haugen (R)
▌9. Myron H. McCord (R)

==== Wyoming ====
▌At-large. Clarence D. Clark (R), from December 1, 1890

==== Non-voting members ====
▌Arizona Territory. Marcus A. Smith (D)
▌Dakota Territory. George A. Mathews (R), until November 2, 1889
▌Idaho Territory. Fred Dubois (R), until July 3, 1890
▌Montana Territory. Thomas H. Carter (R), until November 7, 1889
▌New Mexico Territory. Antonio Joseph (D)
▌Oklahoma Territory. David A. Harvey (R), from November 4, 1890
▌Utah Territory. John T. Caine (D)
▌Washington Territory. John B. Allen (R), until November 11, 1889
▌Wyoming Territory. Joseph M. Carey (R), until July 10, 1890

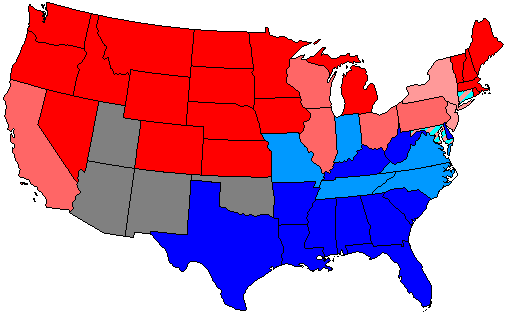
House seats by party holding plurality in state: 80+ to 100% Democratic / 80+ to 100% Republican; 60+ to 80% Democratic / 60+ to 80% Republican; Up to 60% Democratic / Up to 60% Republican

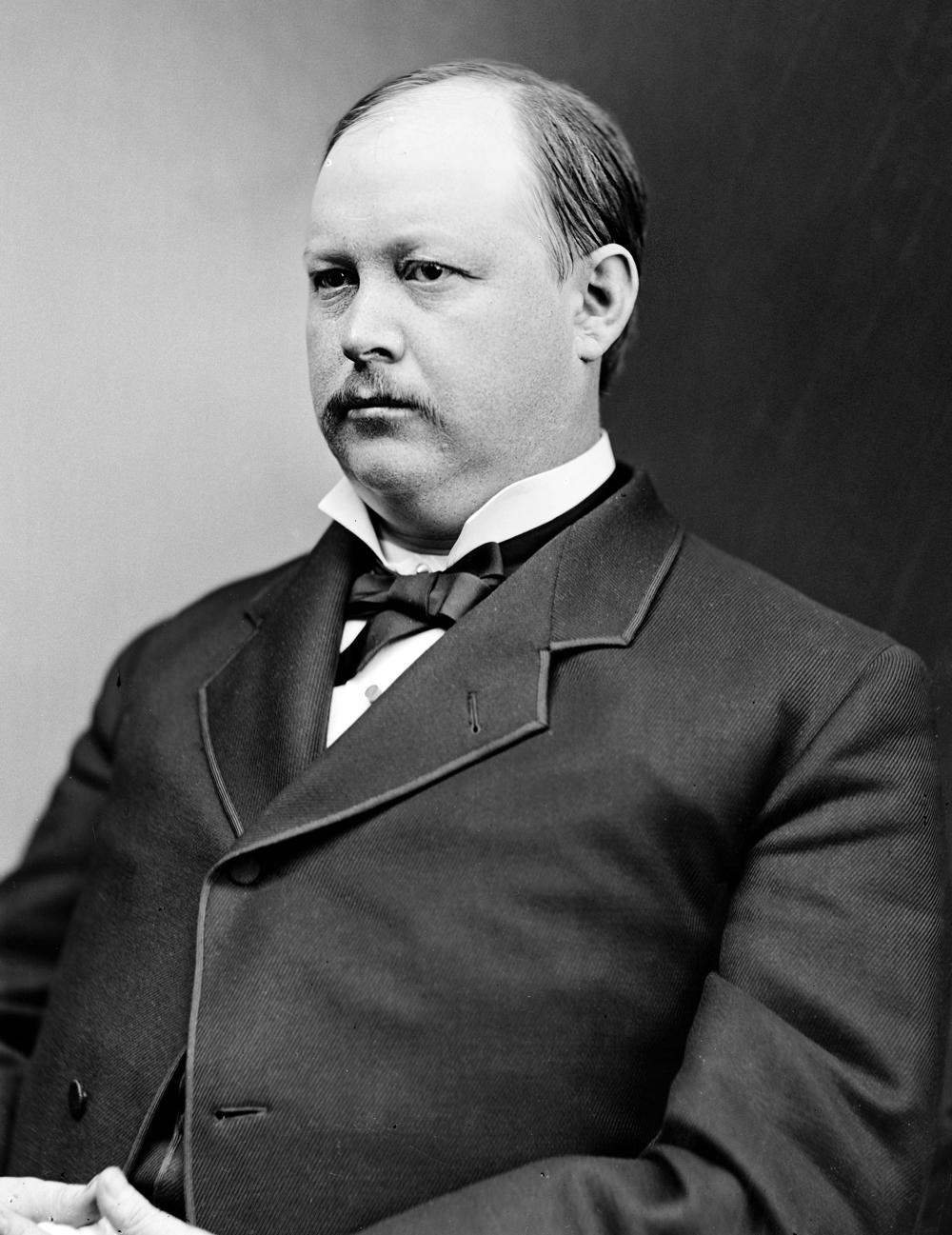
Speaker of the House Thomas B. Reed

== Changes in membership ==
The count below reflects changes from the beginning of the first session of this Congress.

=== Senate ===
- Replacements: 3
  - Democratic: no net change
  - Republican: no net change
  - Liberal Republican: 1-seat net loss
- Deaths: 3
- Resignations: 2
- Interim appointments: 1
- Seats of newly admitted states: 12
- Total seats with changes: 17

| State (class) | Vacated by | Reason for vacancy | Subsequent | Date of successor's installation |
|---|---|---|---|---|
| Rhode Island (2) | Jonathan Chace (R) | Resigned April 9, 1889. Successor was elected. | Nathan F. Dixon III (R) | April 10, 1889 |
| New Hampshire (2) | Gilman Marston (R) | Successor was elected June 18, 1889. | William E. Chandler (R) | June 18, 1889 |
| South Dakota (2) | New seats | South Dakota achieved statehood November 2, 1889. First senators were elected October 16, 1889. | Richard F. Pettigrew (R) | November 2, 1889 |
| South Dakota (3) | New seats | South Dakota achieved statehood November 2, 1889. First senators were elected October 16, 1889. | Gideon C. Moody (R) | November 2, 1889 |
| Montana (1) | New seats | Montana achieved statehood November 8, 1889. First Senator was elected January 1, 1890. His election was challenged based on the legitimacy of the nascent state legislature. The Senate resolved the dispute in his favor April 16, 1890 and he was seated that day. | Wilbur F. Sanders (R) | April 16, 1890 |
| Montana (2) | New seats | Montana achieved statehood November 8, 1889. First Senator was elected January 2, 1890. His election was challenged based on the legitimacy of the nascent state legislature. The Senate resolved the dispute in his favor April 16, 1890 and he was seated that day. | Thomas C. Power (R) | April 16, 1890 |
| Washington (1) | New seats | Washington achieved statehood November 11, 1889. | John B. Allen (R) | November 20, 1889 |
| Washington (3) | New seats | Washington achieved statehood November 11, 1889. | Watson C. Squire (R) | November 20, 1889 |
| Kentucky (2) | James B. Beck (D) | Died May 3, 1890. Successor was elected. | John G. Carlisle (D) | May 26, 1890 |
| North Dakota (3) | New seats | North Dakota achieved statehood November 2, 1889. First senators were elected November 25, 1889. | Gilbert A. Pierce (R) | November 21, 1889 |
| North Dakota (1) | New seats | North Dakota achieved statehood November 2, 1889. First senators were elected November 25, 1889. | Lyman R. Casey (R) | November 25, 1889 |
| Idaho (2) | New seats | Idaho achieved statehood July 3, 1890. | George L. Shoup (R) | December 18, 1890 |
| Idaho (3) | New seats | Idaho achieved statehood July 3, 1890. | William J. McConnell (R) | December 18, 1890 |
| Wyoming (2) | New seats | Wyoming achieved statehood July 10, 1890. New Senator was elected November 15, 1890. | Joseph M. Carey (R) | November 15, 1890 |
| Wyoming (1) | New seats | Wyoming achieved statehood July 10, 1890. New Senator was elected November 18, 1890. | Francis E. Warren (R) | November 24, 1890 |
| Maryland (3) | Ephraim K. Wilson (D) | Died February 24, 1891, having already been re-elected to the next term. | Vacant until next Congress | |
| California (1) | George Hearst (D) | Died February 28, 1891. | Vacant until next Congress | |

=== House of Representatives ===
- Replacements: 16
  - Democratic: 2-seat net gain
  - Republican: 2-seat net loss
- Deaths: 11
- Resignations: 6
- Contested election:8
- Seats of newly admitted states: 7
- Total seats with changes: 33

| District | Vacated by | Reason for change | Successor | Date successor seated |
|---|---|---|---|---|
| Missouri 4th | Vacant | Elected to finish Rep. James N. Burnes who was re-elected to this Congress, but died during previous one. In addition, Rep. Charles F. Booher was elected to finish Burnes's term in previous Congress but chose not to run for re-election for this Congress. | Robert P. C. Wilson (D) | December 2, 1889 |
| Illinois 19th | Richard W. Townshend (D) | Died March 9, 1889 | James R. Williams (D) | December 2, 1889 |
| Kansas 4th | Thomas Ryan (R) | Resigned April 4, 1889 after being appointed U.S. Minister to Mexico | Harrison Kelley (R) | December 2, 1889 |
| Louisiana 3rd | Edward J. Gay (D) | Died May 30, 1889 | Andrew Price (D) | December 2, 1889 |
| Nebraska 2nd | James Laird (R) | Died August 17, 1889 | Gilbert L. Laws (R) | December 2, 1889 |
| New York 9th | Samuel S. Cox (D) | Died September 10, 1889 | Amos J. Cummings (D) | November 5, 1889 |
| New York 27th | Newton W. Nutting (R) | Died October 15, 1889 | Sereno E. Payne (R) | December 2, 1889 |
| Dakota Territory At-large | George A. Mathews (R) | Territory achieved statehood. Remained in seat until November 2, 1889 | Territory achieved statehood | |
| North Dakota At-large | Henry C. Hansbrough (R) | Territory achieved statehood. Took seat November 2, 1889 | New seat | |
| South Dakota At-large | Oscar S. Gifford (R) | Territory achieved statehood. Took seats November 2, 1889 | New seats | |
| South Dakota At-large | John Pickler (R) | Territory achieved statehood. Took seats November 2, 1889 | New seats | |
| Montana Territory At-large | Thomas H. Carter (R) | Territory achieved statehood. Remained in seat until November 7, 1889 | Territory achieved statehood | |
| New York 6th | Frank T. Fitzgerald (D) | Resigned November 4, 1889 after being elected Register of New York County | Charles H. Turner (D) | December 9, 1889 |
| Washington Territory At-large | John B. Allen (R) | Territory achieved statehood. Remained in seat until November 11, 1889 | Territory achieved statehood | |
| Pennsylvania 4th | William D. Kelley (R) | Died January 9, 1890 | John E. Reyburn (R) | February 18, 1890 |
| West Virginia 4th | James M. Jackson (D) | Election was successfully challenged on February 3, 1890 | Charles B. Smith (R) | February 3, 1890 |
| West Virginia 1st | John O. Pendleton (D) | Election was successfully challenged on February 26, 1890 | George W. Atkinson (R) | February 26, 1890 |
| Arkansas 1st | William H. Cate (D) | Election was successfully challenged on March 5, 1890 | Lewis P. Featherstone (L) | March 5, 1890 |
| Maryland 5th | Barnes Compton (D) | Election was successfully challenged on March 20, 1890 | Sydney E. Mudd (R) | March 20, 1890 |
| New York 24th | David Wilber (R) | Died April 1, 1890 | John S. Pindar (D) | November 4, 1890 |
| Virginia 3rd | George D. Wise (D) | Election was successfully challenged on April 10, 1890 | Edmund Waddill Jr. (R) | April 12, 1890 |
| Pennsylvania 3rd | Samuel J. Randall (D) | Died April 13, 1890 | Richard Vaux (D) | May 20, 1890 |
| Kentucky 6th | John G. Carlisle (D) | Resigned May 26, 1890, after being elected to the U.S. Senate | William W. Dickerson (D) | June 21, 1890 |
| Alabama 4th | Louis W. Turpin (D) | Election was successfully challenged on June 4, 1890 | John V. McDuffie (R) | June 4, 1890 |
| Idaho Territory At-large | Fred Dubois (R) | Territory achieved statehood. Remained in seat until July 3, 1890 | Territory achieved statehood | |
| Wyoming Territory At-large | Joseph M. Carey (R) | Territory achieved statehood. Remained in seat until July 10, 1889 | Territory achieved statehood | |
| Montana At-large | Thomas H. Carter (R) | Territory achieved statehood. Took seat November 8, 1889 | New seat | |
| Washington At-large | John L. Wilson (R) | Territory achieved statehood. Took seat November 20, 1889 | New seat | |
| Missouri 14th | James P. Walker (D) | Died July 19, 1890 | Robert H. Whitelaw (D) | November 4, 1890 |
| Pennsylvania 27th | Lewis F. Watson (R) | Died August 25, 1890 | Charles W. Stone (R) | November 4, 1890 |
| Arkansas 2nd | Clifton R. Breckinridge (D) | Election was successfully challenged on September 5, 1890, however Rep-elect John M. Clayton died during election challenge, so seat was declared vacant. Breckinridge was elected to open seat. | Clifton R. Breckinridge (D) | November 4, 1890 |
| South Carolina 7th | William Elliott (D) | Election was successfully challenged on September 23, 1890 | Thomas E. Miller (R) | September 24, 1890 |
| Virginia 4th | Edward C. Venable (D) | Election was successfully challenged on September 23, 1890 | John M. Langston (R) | September 23, 1890 |
| California 1st | John J. De Haven (R) | Resigned October 1, 1890 | Thomas J. Geary (D) | December 9, 1890 |
| Idaho At-large | Willis Sweet (R) | Territory achieved statehood. Took seat October 1, 1890 | New seat | |
| Iowa 7th | Edwin H. Conger (R) | Resigned October 3, 1890, after being appointed U.S. Envoy Extraordinary and Minister Plenipotentiary to Brazil | Edward R. Hays (R) | November 4, 1890 |
| Oklahoma Territory At-large | David A. Harvey (R) | Territory organized from Indian Territory. Took seat November 4, 1890 | New seat | |
| Wyoming At-large | Clarence D. Clark (R) | Territory achieved statehood. Took seat December 1, 1890 | New seat | |
| New York 8th | John H. McCarthy (D) | Resigned January 14, 1891, after being appointed justice of the City Court of New York | Vacant until next Congress | |
| Tennessee 10th | James Phelan Jr. (D) | Died January 30, 1891 | Vacant until next Congress | |

== Committees ==
Lists of committees and their party leaders for members of the House and Senate committees can be found through the Official Congressional Directory at the bottom of this article. The directory after the pages of terms of service lists committees of the Senate, House (Standing with Subcommittees, Select and Special) and Joint and, after that, House/Senate committee assignments. On the committees section of the House and Senate in the Official Congressional Directory, the committee's members on the first row on the left side shows the chairman of the committee and on the right side shows the ranking member of the committee.

=== Senate ===
- Additional Accommodations for the Library of Congress (Select) (Chairman: Daniel W. Voorhees; Ranking Member: William M. Evarts)
- Agriculture and Forestry (Chairman: Algernon S. Paddock; Ranking Member: James Z. George)
- Appropriations (Chairman: William B. Allison; Ranking Member: Francis M. Cockrell)
- Audit and Control the Contingent Expenses of the Senate (Chairman: John P. Jones; Ranking Member: Zebulon B. Vance)
- Canadian Relations (Select) (Chairman: George F. Hoar; Ranking Member: James L. Pugh)
- Census (Chairman: Eugene Hale; Ranking Member: James H. Berry)
- Civil Service and Retrenchment (Chairman: Edward O. Wolcott; Ranking Member: Edward C. Walthall)
- Claims (Chairman: John C. Spooner; Ranking Member: James K. Jones)
- Coast Defenses (Chairman: Joseph N. Dolph; Ranking Member: John R. McPherson)
- Commerce (Chairman: William P. Frye; Ranking Member: Matt W. Ransom)
- Distributing Public Revenue Among the States (Select)
- District of Columbia (Chairman: John J. Ingalls; Ranking Member: Isham G. Harris)
- Education and Labor (Chairman: Henry W. Blair; Ranking Member: James Z. George)
- Engrossed Bills (Chairman: Francis M. Cockrell; Ranking Member: Shelby M. Cullom)
- Enrolled Bills (Chairman: Charles B. Farwell; Ranking Member: Wilbur F. Sanders)
- Epidemic Diseases (Chairman: Isham G. Harris; Ranking Member: Eugene Hale)
- Establish a University in the United States (Select) (Chairman: George F. Edmunds; Ranking Member: Isham G. Harris)
- Examine the Several Branches in the Civil Service (Chairman: Anthony Higgins; Ranking Member: George Gray)
- Executive Departments Methods (Select)
- Finance (Chairman: Justin S. Morrill; Ranking Member: Daniel W. Voorhees)
- Fisheries (Chairman: Francis B. Stockbridge; Ranking Member: Wade Hampton III)
- Five Civilized Tribes of Indians (Select) (Chairman: Matthew C. Butler; Ranking Member: J. Donald Cameron)
- Foreign Relations (Chairman: John Sherman; Ranking Member: John T. Morgan)
- Immigration (Chairman: William E. Chandler; Ranking Member: John R. McPherson)
- Indian Affairs (Chairman: Henry L. Dawes; Ranking Member: John T. Morgan)
- Interstate Commerce (Chairman: Shelby M. Cullom; Ranking Member: Isham G. Harris)
- Irrigation and Reclamation of Arid Lands (Select) (Chairman: William M. Stewart; Ranking Member: Edward C. Walthall)
- Judiciary (Chairman: George F. Edmunds; Ranking Member: James L. Pugh)
- Library (Chairman: William M. Evarts; Ranking Member: Daniel W. Voorhees)
- Manufactures (Chairman: James McMillan; Ranking Member: Alfred H. Colquitt)
- Military Affairs (Chairman: Joseph R. Hawley; Ranking Member: Francis M. Cockrell)
- Mines and Mining (Chairman: William M. Stewart; Ranking Member: William B. Bate)
- Mississippi River and its Tributaries (Select) (Chairman: William D. Washburn; Ranking Member: Edward C. Walthall)
- Naval Affairs (Chairman: J. Donald Cameron; Ranking Member: John R. McPherson)
- Nicaraguan Claims (Select) (Chairman: John Tyler Morgan; Ranking Member: George F. Hoar)
- Organization, Conduct and Expeditures of the Executive Departments (Chairman: Frank Hiscock; Ranking Member: Francis M. Cockrell)
- Patents (Chairman: Henry M. Teller; Ranking Member: George Gray)
- Pensions (Chairman: Cushman K. Davis; Ranking Member: Gilbert A. Pierce)
- Post Office and Post Roads (Chairman: Philetus Sawyer; Ranking Member: Nathan F. Dixon)
- Potomac River Front (Select) (Chairman: John R. McPherson; Ranking Member: Charles F. Manderson)
- Printing (Chairman: Charles F. Manderson; Ranking Member: Arthur P. Gorman)
- Private Land Claims (Chairman: Matt W. Ransom; Ranking Member: William M. Stewart)
- Privileges and Elections (Chairman: George F. Hoar; Ranking Member: Zebulon B. Vance)
- Public Buildings and Grounds (Chairman: Leland Stanford; Ranking Member: George G. Vest)
- Public Lands (Chairman: Preston B. Plumb; Ranking Member: Richard F. Pettigrew)
- Quadrocentennial (Select) (Chairman: Frank Hiscock; Ranking Member: James B. Eustis)
- Railroads (Chairman: John H. Mitchell; Ranking Member: Joseph E. Brown)
- Revision of the Laws (Chairman: James F. Wilson; Ranking Member: Ephraim K. Wilson)
- Revolutionary Claims (Chairman: Richard Coke; Ranking Member: Justin S. Morrill)
- Rules (Chairman: Nelson W. Aldrich; Ranking Member: Isham G. Harris)
- Senate Administrative Services (Select)
- Tariff Regulation (Select)
- Territories (Chairman: Orville H. Platt; Ranking Member: Gilbert A. Pierce)
- Transportation and Sale of Meat Products (Select) (Chairman: George G. Vest; Ranking Member: Randall L. Gibson)
- Transportation Routes to the Seaboard (Chairman: Matthew S. Quay; Ranking Member: Randall L. Gibson)
- Whole
- Woman Suffrage (Select) (Chairman: Zebulon B. Vance; Ranking Member: Charles B. Farwell)

=== House of Representatives ===
- Accounts (Chairman: Henry J. Spooner; Ranking Member: Solomon G. Comstock)
- Agriculture (Chairman: Edward H. Funston; Ranking Member: William H. Hatch)
- Alcoholic Liquor Traffic (Select)
- Appropriations (Chairman: Joseph G. Cannon; Ranking Member: Samuel J. Randall)
- Banking and Currency (Chairman: George W.E. Dorsey; Ranking Member: Joseph R. Reed)
- Claims (Chairman: William G. Laidlaw; Ranking Member: George W. Dargan)
- Coinage, Weights and Measures (Chairman: Charles P. Wickham; Ranking Member: Richard P. Bland)
- Commerce (Chairman: Charles S. Baker; Ranking Member: Henry Stockbridge Jr.)
- Disposition of Executive Papers
- District of Columbia (Chairman: William W. Grout; Ranking Member: John J. Hemphill)
- Education (Chairman: James O'Donnell; Ranking Member: Henry P. Cheatham)
- Elections (Chairman: Jonathan H. Rowell; Ranking Member: Solomon G. Comstock)
- Enrolled Bills (Chairman: Robert P. Kennedy; Ranking Member: Constantine B. Kilgore)
- Expenditures in the Agriculture Department (Chairman: Robert M. La Follette; Ranking Member: Edward Lane)
- Expenditures in the Interior Department (Chairman: Nathaniel P. Banks; Ranking Member: James D. Richardson)
- Expenditures in the Justice Department (Chairman: James S. Sherman; Ranking Member: John C. Tarsney)
- Expenditures in the Navy Department (Chairman: John G. Sawyer; Ranking Member: Judson C. Clements)
- Expenditures in the Post Office Department (Chairman: John M. Brower; Ranking Member: Thomas S. Flood)
- Expenditures in the State Department (Chairman: Joseph A. Scranton; Ranking Member: Marion Biggs)
- Expenditures in the Treasury Department (Chairman: Louis E. Atkinson; Ranking Member: William Cogswell)
- Expenditures in the War Department (Chairman: Robert M. Yardley; Ranking Member: William C.P. Breckinridge)
- Expenditures on Public Buildings (Chairman: Thomas S. Flood; Ranking Member: Joseph H. O'Neil)
- Foreign Affairs (Chairman: Robert R. Hitt; Ranking Member: Hamilton D. Coleman)
- Indian Affairs (Chairman: Bishop W. Perkins; Ranking Member: John L. Wilson)
- Invalid Pensions (Chairman: Edmund N. Morrill; Ranking Member: Gilbert L. Laws)
- Judiciary (Chairman: Ezra B. Taylor; Ranking Member: Joseph R. Reed)
- Labor (Chairman: William H. Wade; Ranking Member: Aaron T. Bliss)
- Levees and Improvements of the Mississippi River (Chairman: Julius C. Burrows; Ranking Member: Charles D. Beckwith)
- Manufactures (Chairman: James Buchanan; Ranking Member: William D. Bynum)
- Merchant Marine and Fisheries (Chairman: John M. Farquhar; Ranking Member: Hamilton G. Ewart)
- Mileage (Chairman: John Lind; Ranking Member: Thomas J. Clunie)
- Military Affairs (Chairman: Byron M. Cutcheon; Ranking Member: Samuel P. Snider)
- Militia (Chairman: David B. Henderson; Ranking Member: Harrison Kelley)
- Mines and Mining (Chairman: Thomas H. Carter; Ranking Member: Myron H. McCord)
- Naval Affairs (Chairman: Charles A. Boutelle; Ranking Member: Hamilton D. Coleman)
- Pacific Railroads (Chairman: John Dalzell; Ranking Member: James P. Flick)
- Patents (Chairman: Benjamin Butterworth; Ranking Member: H. Clay Evans)
- Pensions (Chairman: Milton De Lano; Ranking Member: Thomas H. B. Browne)
- Printing (Chairman: Charles A. Russell; Ranking Member: James D. Richardson)
- Private Land Claims (Chairman: Lucien B. Caswell; Ranking Member: Hamilton G. Ewart)
- Post Office and Post Roads (Chairman: Henry H. Bingham; Ranking Member: James H. Blount)
- Public Buildings and Grounds (Chairman: Seth L. Milliken; Ranking Member: Oscar S. Gifford)
- Public Lands (Chairman: Lewis E. Payson; Ranking Member: William S. Holman)
- Railways and Canals (Chairman: Henry C. McCormick; Ranking Member: Gilbert L. Laws)
- Revision of Laws (Chairman: Thomas M. Browne; Ranking Member: Frederic T. Greenhalge)
- Rivers and Harbors (Chairman: Thomas J. Henderson; Ranking Member: Frederick G. Niedringhaus)
- Rules (Chairman: Charles F. Crisp; Ranking Member: James H. Blount)
- Standards of Official Conduct
- Territories (Chairman: Isaac S. Struble; Ranking Member: George W. Smith)
- War Claims (Chairman: Ormsby B. Thomas; Ranking Member: Jonathan P. Dolliver)
- Ways and Means (Chairman: William McKinley; Ranking Member: John G. Carlisle)
- Whole

=== Joint committees ===
- Conditions of Indian Tribes (Special)
- Disposition of (Useless) Executive Papers
- The Library
- Printing

== Caucuses ==
- Democratic (House)
- Democratic (Senate)

== Employees ==
=== Legislative branch agency directors ===
- Architect of the Capitol: Edward Clark
- Librarian of Congress: Ainsworth Rand Spofford
- Public Printer of the United States: Thomas E. Benedict, until 1889
  - Francis W. Palmer, from 1889

=== Senate ===
- Chaplain: John G. Butler (Lutheran)
- Secretary: Anson G. McCook
- Librarian: Alonzo M. Church
- Sergeant at Arms: William P. Canady, until June 30, 1890
  - Edward K. Valentine, from June 30, 1890

=== House of Representatives ===
- Chaplain: William H. Milburn (Methodist)
- Clerk: John B. Clark Jr., until December 2, 1889
  - Edward McPherson, from December 2, 1889
- Doorkeeper: Charles E. Adams
- Postmaster: James L. Wheat, resigned October 1, 1890
  - James W. Hathaway, elected December 10, 1890
- Clerk at the Speaker’s Table: Nathaniel T. Crutchfield
  - Edward F. Goodwin
- Reading Clerks: John A. Reeve (D) and Azro J. Maxham (R)
- Sergeant at Arms: John P. Leedom, until December 2, 1889
  - Adoniram J. Holmes, from December 2, 1889

== See also ==
- 1888 United States elections (elections leading to this Congress)
  - 1888 United States presidential election
  - 1888–89 United States Senate elections
  - 1888 United States House of Representatives elections
- 1890 United States elections (elections during this Congress, leading to the next Congress)
  - 1890–91 United States Senate elections
  - 1890 United States House of Representatives elections
