= Cathedral Historic District (Sioux Falls, South Dakota) =

Historic district in South Dakota, United States

- U.S. National Register of Historic Places
- U.S. Historic district
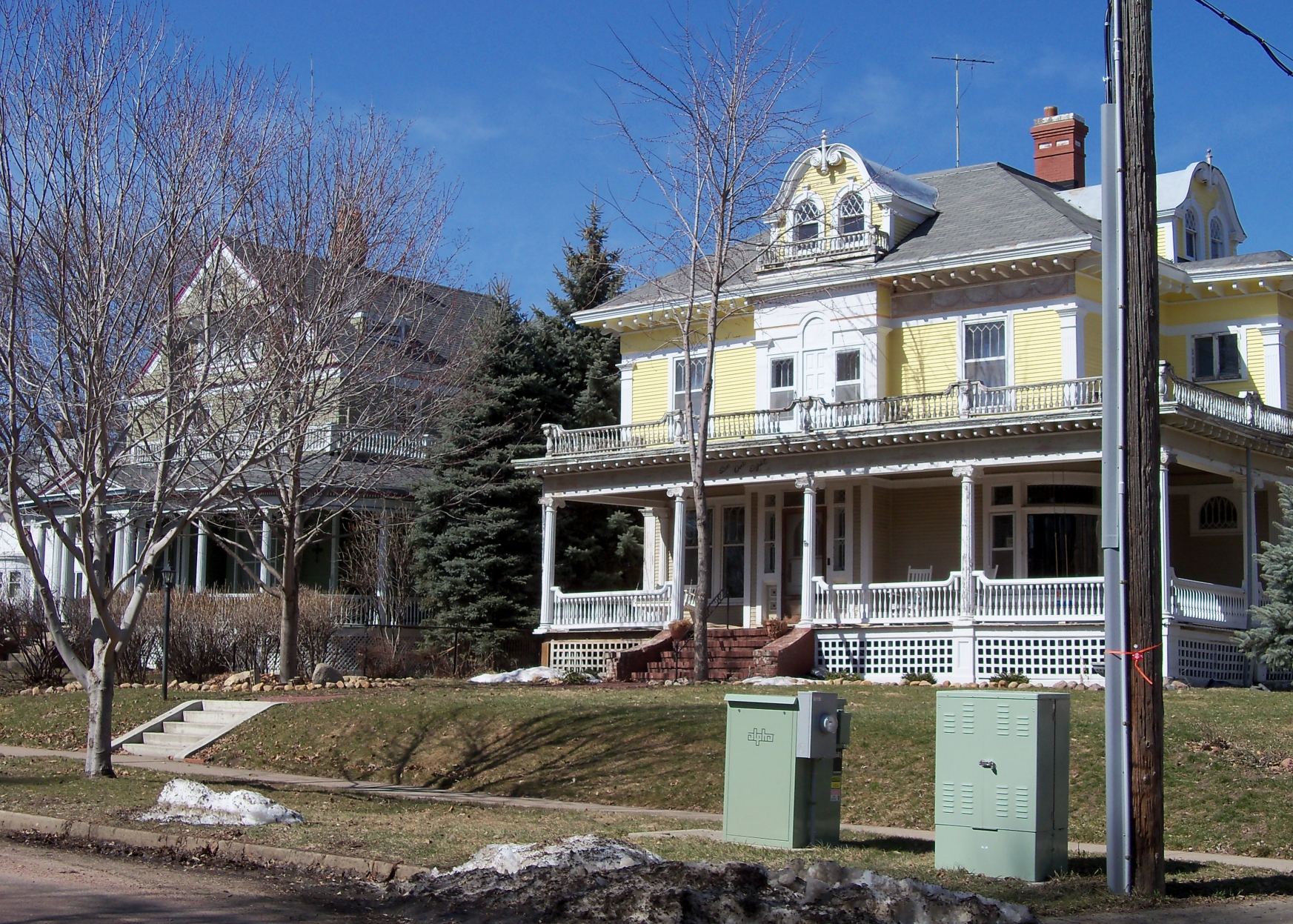
- Historic houses in the Cathedral Historic District, 2010
- Interactive map of Cathedral Historic District
- Location: Bounded by West 4th and 10th Streets, Spring, Prairie, and Summit Avenues (14 blocks and east 1/2 of 6 blocks); Sioux Falls, South Dakota
- Area: 79 acres (32 ha) (1974 listing)
- Built: 1872
- Architectural style: Late 19th and 20th century revivals, Queen Anne, Mediterranean Revival
- NRHP reference No.: 74001896 (original); 100009066 (increase)

Significant dates
- Added to NRHP: June 5, 1974
- Boundary increase: June 29, 2023

Cathedral Historic District, originally the Sioux Falls Historic District, is located in Sioux Falls, South Dakota. Named for its centerpiece and key contributing property, the Cathedral of Saint Joseph, the district covers the neighbourhood historically known as Nob Hill, where multiple prominent pioneers, politicians, and businessmen settled in the late 19th and early 20th centuries. These homes primarily reflect Queen Anne and Mediterranean Revival architectural styles. In 1974, the neighborhood was listed as a historic district on the National Register of Historic Places (NRHP); at the time of this listing, there were 223 buildings, not all contributing, within the district's boundaries. The district was enlarged in 2023.

== Location and architecture ==
The Cathedral Historic District covers 14 blocks and the eastern half of 6 blocks just west of downtown Sioux Falls. It is roughly bounded to the south by West 10th Street, to the east by Spring Avenue, to the north by 4th Street, and to the west by Prairie Avenue. The district is built on an incline and slopes eastwards, towards downtown.

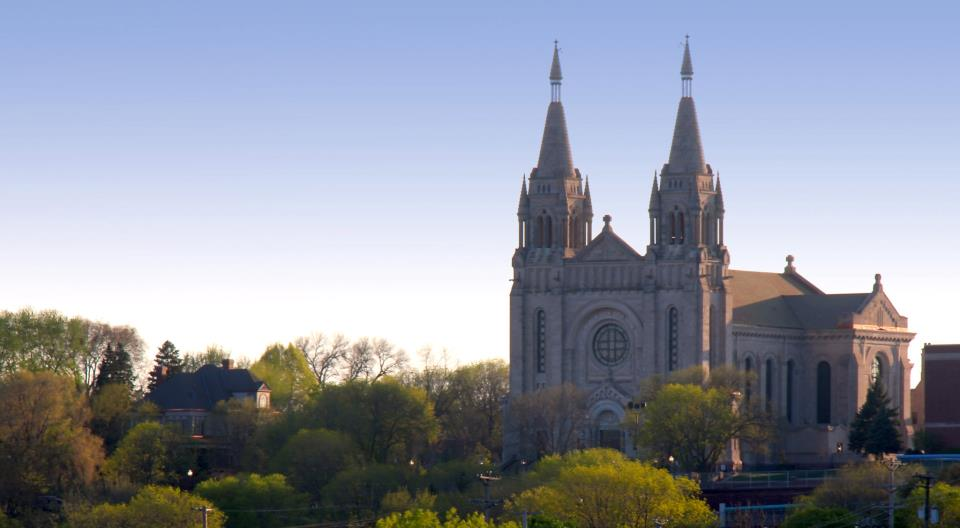
The Cathedral of Saint Joseph dominates the district's skyline

Various architectural styles popular during the late 19th and early 20th centuries are represented by the district's houses. The most common style is Queen Anne architecture, which about 38% of the contributing houses embody. Of the Queen Anne homes, about 15% are of the subclass Queen Anne Cottage. As the popularity of Queen Anne waned after the turn of the 20th century, these houses are among the oldest in the district. Another 23% of houses were built in the slightly newer Mediterranean Revival style. The architectural survey done in preparation for the NRHP listing identified 14 other architectural styles, including Colonial Revival and Richardsonian Romanesque.

The oldest home here was built in 1872; 104 homes—almost half of the contributing structures—were built between then and 1900. An additional 51 homes went up between 1901 and 1910, and another 35 between 1910 and 1920. Although new construction continues within the district, these are comparably rare and few in number. West 10th Street is a commercial corridor, and many of the intrusions into the historic district are located there.

== Key contributing properties ==
Several buildings have been identified as key and primary contributing properties to the district's historical and architectural integrity.

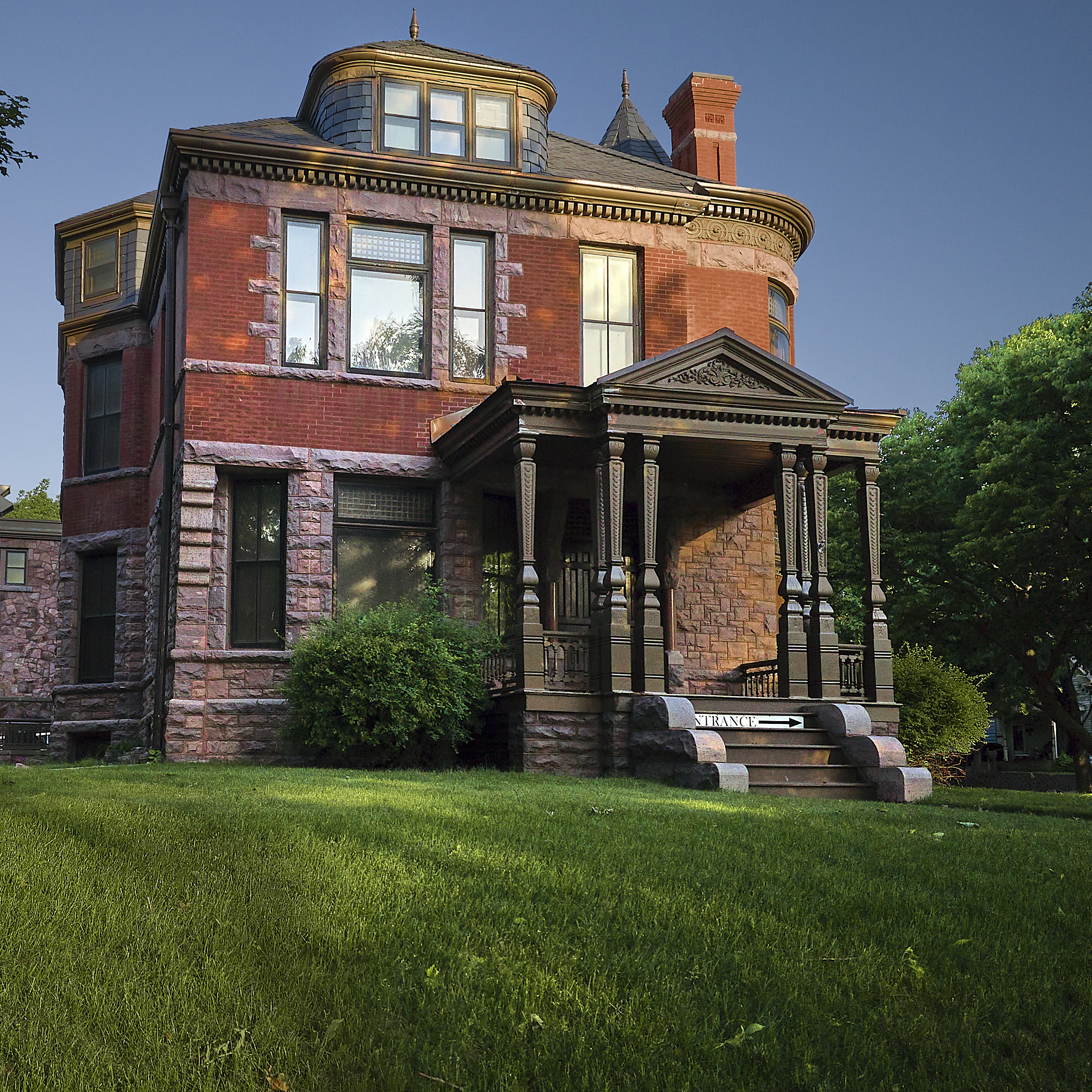
Pettigrew Home & Museum

- Cathedral of Saint Joseph, 503 North Duluth Avenue: Situated on a hill that overlooks the district, this Roman Catholic cathedral was constructed in 1916. With Romanesque design elements and towers that dominate the district's skyline, it functions as the district's architectural centerpiece and namesake.
- Joe Kirby Home, 350 (Note: The NRHP listing erroneously gives this house number as 305 North Duluth Avenue.) North Duluth Avenue: An 1880 build with Richardsonian Romanesque elements, it is one of the oldest homes in the district. It has a Sioux Quartzite exterior with heavy decorations made of the same material along the window lintels and transoms. The main door is framed by an archway and is adjacent to a small porch with a conical roof. The home also has a round turret tower.
- L.T. Dunning Home, 209 North Duluth Avenue: This Stick-style home was built in 1887. Both the interior and exterior are outfitted in intricate woodwork of oak, maple, and pine.
- Pettigrew Home & Museum, 131 (Note: The NRHP listing is under 135 North Duluth Avenue, but it is today numbered 131 North Duluth Avenue.) North Duluth Avenue: Constructed in 1889 and purchased in 1911 by former United States Senator Richard Franklin Pettigrew, this Queen Anne-style home was converted into a historic house and local history museum upon Pettigrew's death in 1926. Pettigrew also had another residence in the district at 215 North Duluth Avenue.
- William A. Wilkes Home, 301 North Prairie Avenue: A Colonial Revival structure built in 1891. It has a triangular pediment above its front entryway supported by two large Ionic columns. The cornice of its hipped roof is adorned with dentils.
- Henry Avery Home, 103 South Prairie Avenue: A two-story Richardsonian Romanesque home clad in Sioux granite built in 1889. This well-preserved building is marked by a large turret and a steep roof with maple and pine floors.
- William Beach Home, 303 North Summit Avenue: A Shingle-style home built in 1893. Its exterior is clad in teal shingles and wood siding. It has a large wrap-around porch supported by balustrades. Its front façade features a panel with a "unique twisted-stick design".
- Cyrus Walts Home, 103 South Summit Avenue: A 'castle-like' Queen Anne-style house built by Dow in 1890. It has an irregular floor plan, with a wrap-around porch, 'unusual roof shapes', and a round turret tower. It also features distinctive blue shingle covering on the exterior. It is notably similar to the 'Avery House' at 103 S Prairie Avenue.
