= John B. Raymond =

American politician

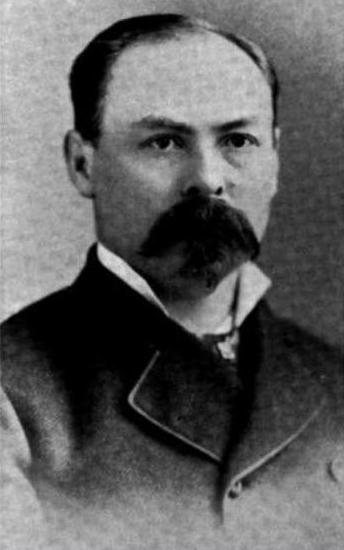
From Volume II of 1915's History of Dakota Territory.

John Baldwin Raymond (December 5, 1844 – January 3, 1886) was a Delegate from Dakota Territory to the United States House of Representatives. He was born in Lockport, Niagara County, New York, then moved with his parents to Tazewell County, Illinois in 1853. He served in the Union Army in the Illinois Thirty-First Regiment during the American Civil War, being promoted to Captain for action at the Battle of Vicksburg.

Following the war Raymond settled in Mississippi. He published the Mississippi Pilot newspaper at Jackson, Mississippi during Reconstruction. He was assistant State treasurer of Mississippi, and was appointed United States marshal of Dakota Territory in 1877, with headquarters at Yankton and later at Fargo.

He was elected as a Republican to the House, serving from March 4, 1883 - March 3, 1885. He was an unsuccessful candidate for renomination in 1884, and engaged in wheat farming. He died in Fargo, and was interred in the public vault in Rock Creek Cemetery, Washington, D.C.

U.S. House of Representatives
Preceded by Richard F. Pettigrew	Delegate to the U.S. House of Representatives from Dakota Territory; March 4, 1883 – March 3, 1885	Succeeded by Oscar S. Gifford
