= Alfred B. Kittredge =

American politician (1861–1911)

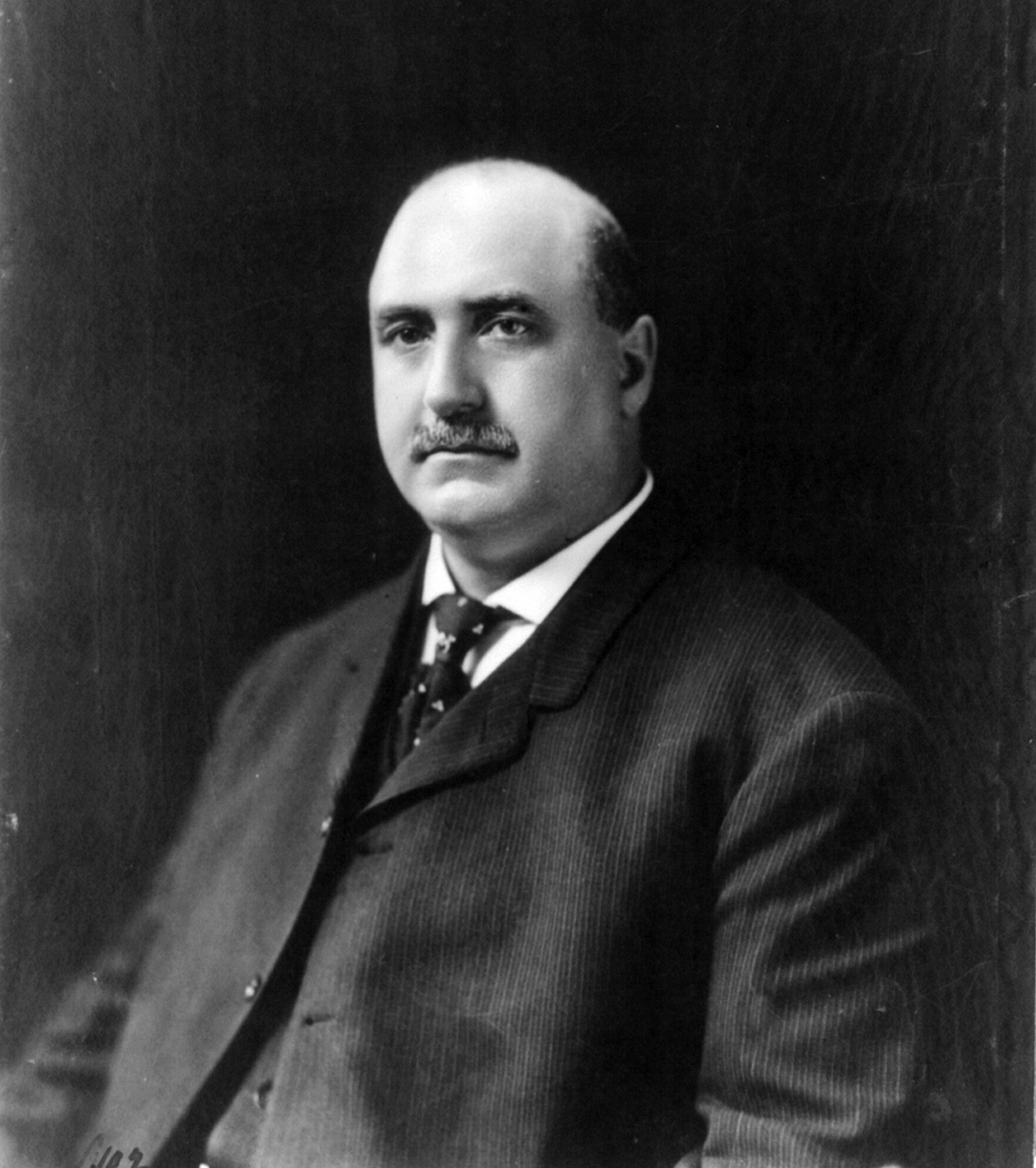

United States Senator from South Dakota
- In office July 11, 1901 – March 3, 1909
- Preceded by: James H. Kyle
- Succeeded by: Coe I. Crawford

Member of the Republican National Committee from South Dakota
- In office 1892–1899
- Preceded by: Arthur C. Mellette
- Succeeded by: Joseph M. Greene

Member of the South Dakota Senate from the 9th District
- In office 1889–1893 Serving with J. A. Cooley (1st term), Lasse Bothun (2nd term)
- Preceded by: None (position created)
- Succeeded by: Charles L. Brockway, James Hart

Personal details
- Born: March 28, 1861 Nelson, New Hampshire
- Died: May 4, 1911 (aged 50) Hot Springs, Arkansas
- Resting place: Conant Cemetery, Jaffrey, New Hampshire
- Education: Yale College; Yale Law School
- Occupation: Attorney

Alfred Beard Kittredge (March 28, 1861 – May 4, 1911) was a United States senator from South Dakota.

== Early life and education ==
Kittredge was born in Nelson, New Hampshire, the son of Russell H. Kittredge, a physician, and Laura Frances (Holmes) Kittredge. He was raised and educated in Jaffrey, New Hampshire. Kittredge graduated from Yale College in 1882 and studied law with Wheelock G. Veazey of Rutland, Vermont and at the firm of Bachelder and Faulkner in Keene, New Hampshire. He then attended Yale Law School, from which he graduated in 1885. He was admitted to the bar in 1885 and commenced practice in Sioux Falls, South Dakota. While establishing himself as an attorney, Kittredge became the Sioux Falls correspondent for the St. Paul Pioneer Press, a leading Republican newspaper, which enabled him to develop personal and professional contacts that proved useful during his political career.

== Political career ==
A Republican, Kittredge served as chairman of the party in Minnehaha County. He was twice elected to the South Dakota Senate, and served from 1889 to 1893. He was a member of the Republican National Committee from 1892 to 1899.

In 1901, Kittredge was appointed to the U.S. Senate to fill the vacancy caused by the death of James H. Kyle. He was elected to a full term in 1903, and served from July 11, 1901 to March 3, 1909. While in the Senate, he was chairman of the Select Committee on Standards, Weights and Measures (57th Congress), the Committee on Patents (58th and 59th Congresses), and the Committee on Interoceanic Canals (60th Congress). His committee on canals was in part responsible for the selection of Panama over Nicaragua as the location for construction of a canal between the Atlantic and Pacific Oceans.

Kittredge was an unsuccessful candidate for renomination in 1908. After leaving the Senate, he resumed the practice of law in Sioux Falls.

== Later life ==
In his later years, Kittredge's weight exceeded 300 pounds, and he began to experience health problems. In October 1910, he became chronically ill after overexerting himself while walking from the courthouse to his offices in cold weather. His doctors recommended that he end his law practice and business affairs, and Kittredge returned to Jaffrey to live in retirement.

== Death and burial ==
In February 1911, Kittredge traveled to Hot Springs, Arkansas in hopes of recovering his health. He continued to decline, and became comatose in late April. He died in Hot Springs on May 4, 1911. He was buried at Conant Cemetery in Jaffrey, New Hampshire. Kittredge never married, and had no children.

== Sources ==
=== Internet ===
- Annett, Albert; Lehtinen, Alice E. (2011). "Biography, Alfred Kittredge". JaffreyHistory.org. Jaffrey, NH: Jaffrey Historic District Commission.

=== Newspapers ===
- "Hon. A. B. Kittredge was chosen by the Minneapolis convention for national committeeman from South Dakota". Argus Leader. Sioux Falls, SD. June 22, 1892 – via Newspapers.com.
- "A. B. Kittredge has retired from his position as Republican national committeeman". The State Democrat. Aberdeen, SD. April 7, 1899 – via Newspapers.com.

=== Books ===
- Coursey, Oscar William (1915). Biography of Senator Alfred Beard Kittredge: His Complete Life and Work. Mitchell, SD: Educator Supply Company.
- U.S. Congress (2005). Biographical Directory of the United States Congress, 1774-2005 (PDF). Washington, DC: U.S. Government Printing Office. ISBN 978-0-16-073176-1.

U.S. Senate
| Preceded by James H. Kyle | U.S. senator (Class 3) from South Dakota; 1901–1909; Served alongside: Robert J. Gamble | Succeeded by Coe I. Crawford |
