= Frank T. Fitzgerald =

American politician

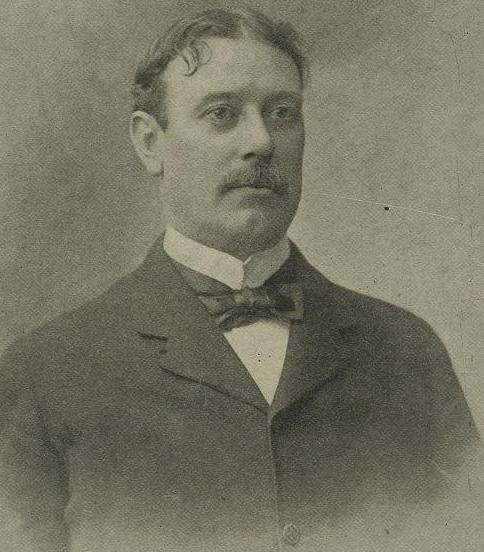

Member of the U.S. House of Representatives from New York's 6th district
- In office March 4, 1889 – November 4, 1889
- Preceded by: Amos J. Cummings
- Succeeded by: Charles H. Turner

Personal details
- Born: Frank Thomas Fitzgerald; May 4, 1857 New York City, New York
- Died: November 25, 1907 (aged 50) New York City, New York
- Party: Democratic

Frank Thomas Fitzgerald (May 4, 1857 – November 25, 1907) was an American lawyer and politician who served as a U.S. representative from New York for eight months in 1889.

== Biography ==
Born in New York City, Fitzgerald was graduated from the College of St. Francis Xavier, New York City, from St. Mary's College, Niagara Falls, New York, in 1876, and from the Columbia Law School, New York City, in 1878. He was admitted to the bar the same year and commenced practice in New York City in 1879.

=== Political career ===
Fitzgerald was elected as a Democrat to the Fifty-first Congress. He served from March 4, 1889, until November 4, 1889, when he resigned, having been elected register of New York County and held that office until 1892. He was replaced in the House by Charles H. Turner.

He served as delegate to the State constitutional convention in 1893.

=== Later career and death ===
Fitzgerald was elected surrogate of New York County in 1892 for a term of fourteen years. He was reelected in 1906 and served in this capacity until his death in New York City November 25, 1907.

He was interred Calvary Cemetery, Woodside, New York.

U.S. House of Representatives
Preceded by Amos J. Cummings	Member of the U.S. House of Representatives from New York's 6th congressional district March 4, 1889 – November 4, 1889	Succeeded by Charles Henry Turner
