= Canton Indian Insane Asylum =

Facility in Lincoln County, South Dakota (1898–1934)

- Canton Asylum for American Indians Cemetery
- U.S. National Register of Historic Places
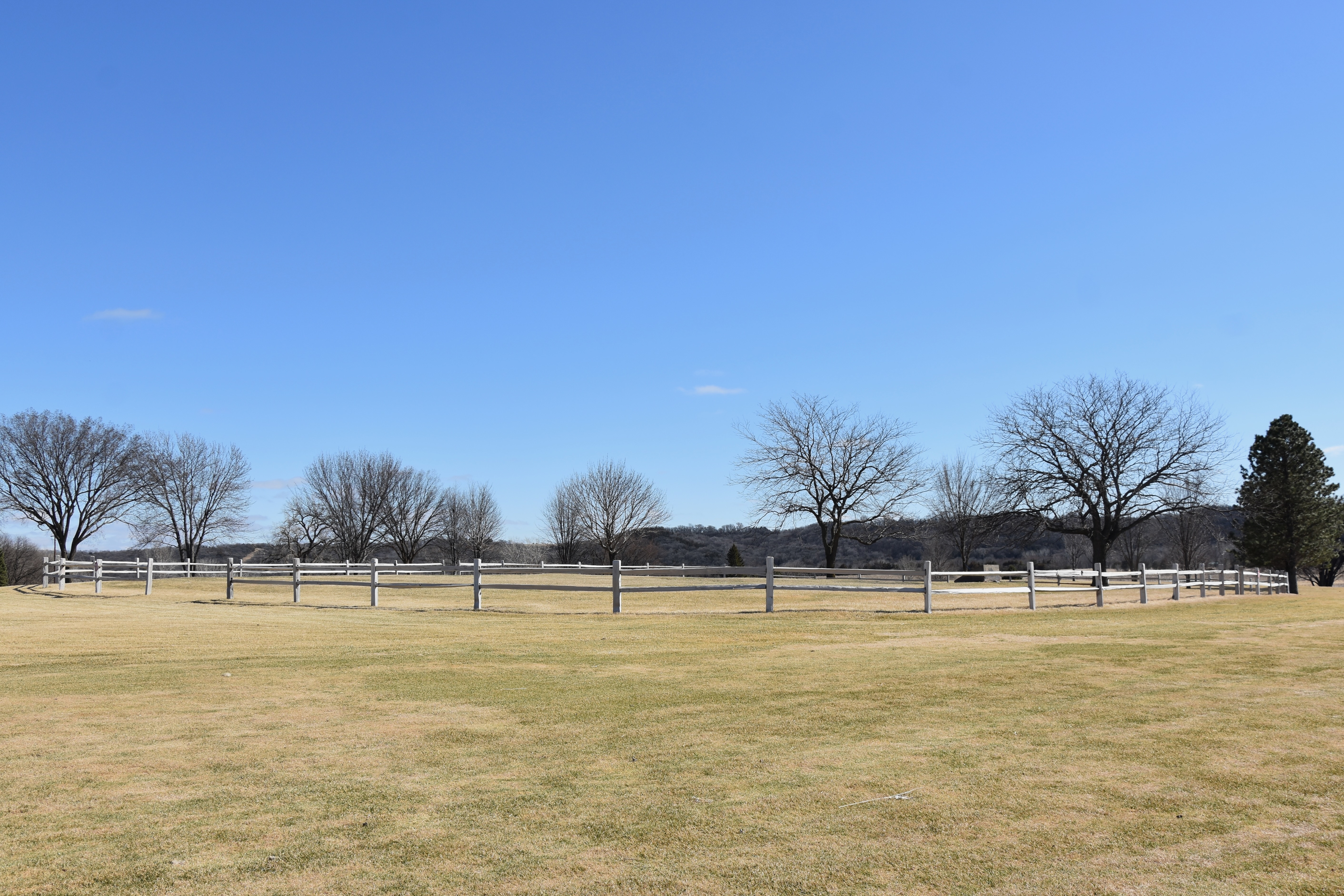
- The cemetery in 2026

- Location within South Dakota Location within the United States
- Location: North of the junction of U.S. Route 18 and the former Chicago, Milwaukee, St. Paul and Pacific railroad tracks, Canton, South Dakota
- Coordinates: 43°18′14.5″N 96°33′06.3″W
- Area: less than one acre
- NRHP reference No.: 98000074
- Added to NRHP: February 20, 1998

The Canton Indian Insane Asylum, aka Hiawatha Insane Asylum, was a federal facility for Native Americans located in Canton, South Dakota, between 1898 and 1934.

== History ==
In 1898, Congress passed a bill creating the only 'Institution for Insane Indians' in the United States. The Canton Indian Insane Asylum (sometimes called Hiawatha Insane Asylum) opened for the reception of patients in January 1903. The first administrator was Oscar S. Gifford. Many of the inmates were not mentally ill. Native Americans risked being confined in the asylum for alcoholism, opposing government or business interests, or for being culturally misunderstood. A 1927 investigation conducted by the Bureau of Indian Affairs determined that a large number of patients showed no signs of mental illness. While open, more than 350 patients were detained there, in terrible conditions. At least 121 died. The asylum was closed in 1934.

== Canton Indian Insane Asylum Cemetery ==
Land was set aside for a cemetery, but the Indian Office decided that stone markers for graves would be an unwarranted expense. Today, the cemetery, with at least 121 burials, is located north of the junction of U.S. Route 18 and the former Chicago, Milwaukee, St. Paul and Pacific railroad tracks
43°18′20″N 96°33′4″W

The National Park Service added the cemetery to the National Register of Historic Places in 1998.

== In literature ==
- Kent Nerburn's The Girl Who Sang to the Buffalo includes accounts of conditions and residents' lives within the facility.
