= James H. Kyle =

American politician

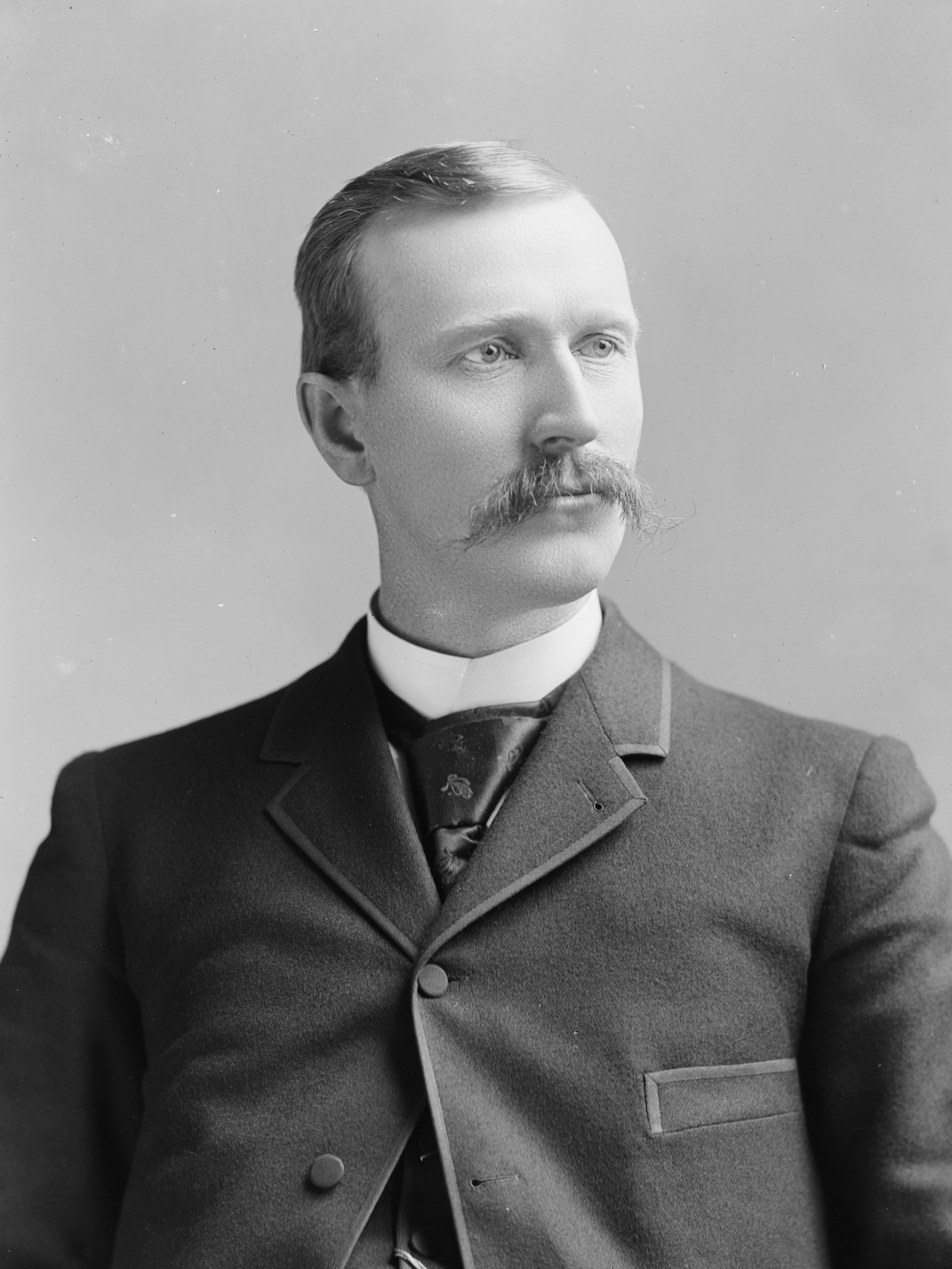
- Portrait by C. M. Bell c. 1891–1894

United States Senator from South Dakota
- In office March 4, 1891 – July 1, 1901
- Preceded by: Gideon C. Moody
- Succeeded by: Alfred B. Kittredge

Personal details
- Born: James Henderson Kyle; February 24, 1854 Cedarville, Ohio
- Died: July 1, 1901 (aged 47) Aberdeen, South Dakota
- Party: People's Party; Republican

James Henderson Kyle (February 24, 1854 – July 1, 1901) was an American politician. One of the most successful members of the Populist Party, he served for 10 years as a member of the United States Senate from South Dakota, from 1891 until his death. Kyle, South Dakota was named after him.

== Biography ==
James Henderson Kyle was born at his family's farm in Cedarville, Ohio. His parents were Capt. Thomas Beveridge Kyle and Margaret Jane Henderson Kyle and he had at least 5 siblings. His great-grandparents were Scottish and Irish immigrants. At the age of 11 he moved with his family to Urbana, Illinois.

As a young man James Kyle had difficulty choosing his career, but gained much education and supported himself by farming and teaching. He studied civil engineering at the University of Illinois and later graduated from Oberlin College in 1878. He considered a career in law but eventually decided to become a Congregational minister and graduated from Western Theological Seminary in Pennsylvania in 1881. He then moved to Salt Lake City, Utah in 1882 to become pastor of a church and director of a seminary there. In 1885 he moved to South Dakota because it was better for his wife's health. He continued to be a minister until 1891.

In 1890, shortly after South Dakota became a state, he entered politics at the urging of many people after he made a passionate political address. He was first elected to the South Dakota Senate as an independent, but resigned a few months later, following his election to the United States Senate. He refused to join a political party and was one of few people to enter the Senate as an independent, but he was supported by the state Democratic party at this time. During his first term in the Senate he joined the emerging Populist Party. Kyle was re-elected to the Senate by the state legislature in 1897. Soon after, as the Populist Party was disintegrating, Kyle switched to the Republican Party.

Kyle served on many committees in the Senate. From 1893 to 1895 and from 1897 to 1901 he was the chairman of the Committee on Education and Labor, and from 1895 to 1897 he was the chairman of a committee to establish a university of the United States. Kyle was one of the main sponsors of a bill to create the holiday Labor Day. Kyle strongly supported the Spanish–American War. Kyle was known as a hard-working, articulate senator who defended the rights of workers. From 1898 to 1901 he served as a member of the National Industrial Commission.

Kyle began to suffer from serious health problems in 1898. He died at the age of 47 in Aberdeen, South Dakota where he had lived from the late 1880s until 1891.

Kyle was married to Anna Eliza Dugot Kyle and they had two children.

== See also ==
- Politics of the United States
- List of members of the United States Congress who died in office (1900–1949)

U.S. Senate
Preceded by Gideon C. Moody	U.S. senator (Class 3) from South Dakota; 1891–1901; Served alongside: Richard F. Pettigrew, Robert J. Gamble	Succeeded by Alfred B. Kittredge
