= Pettigrew Home & Museum =

Historic house museum in Sioux Falls, South Dakota, United States

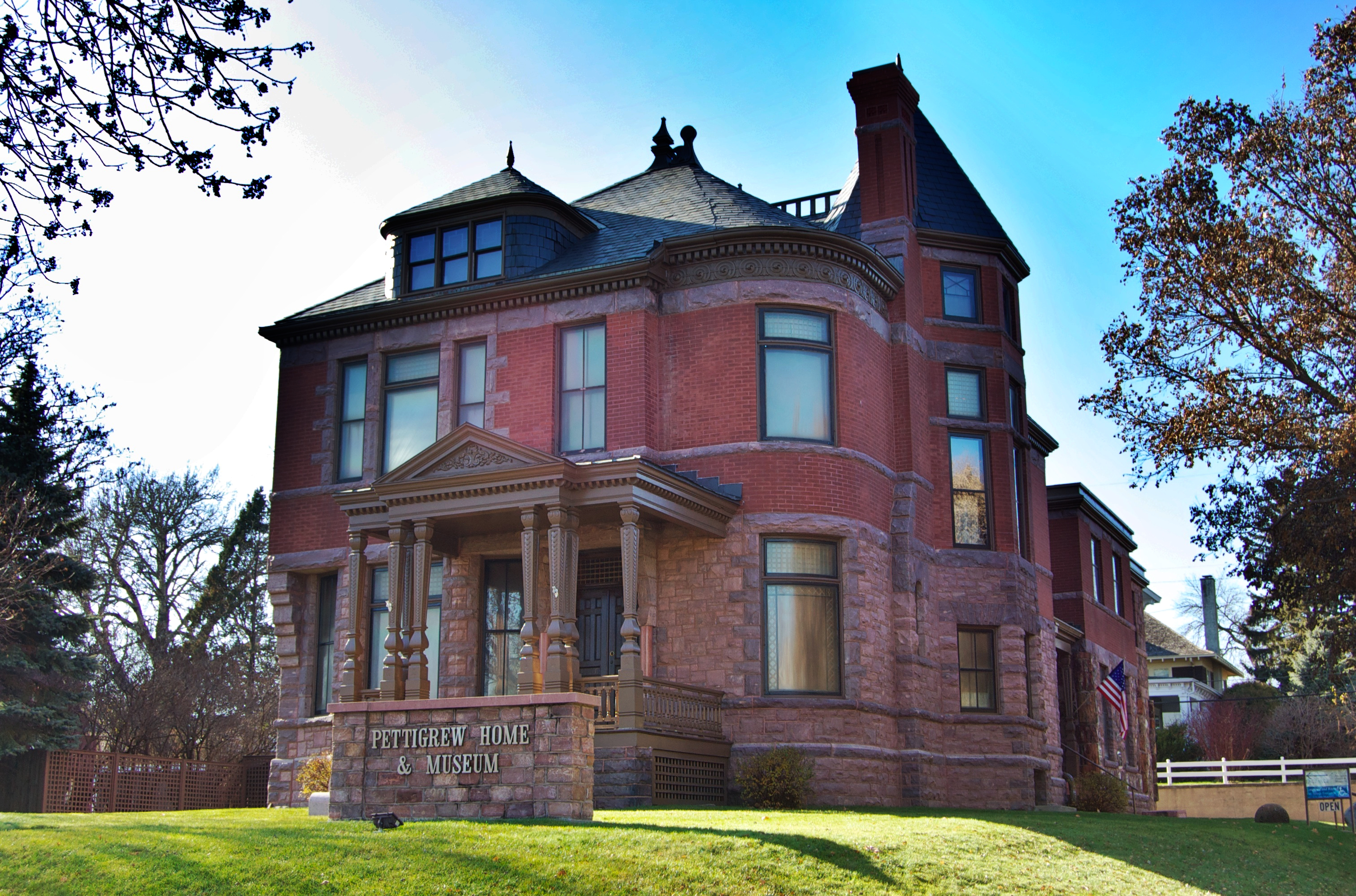
- Pettigrew Home & Museum
- Established: 1925
- Location: 131 North Duluth Avenue; Sioux Falls, South Dakota
- Coordinates: 43.5483768°N 96.7346981°W
- Type: local, historic house
- Founder: Richard Franklin Pettigrew
- Owner: Siouxland Heritage Museums
- Website: www.siouxlandmuseums.com/index.php/home-page/pettigrew-home-museum/
- Pettigrew Home & Museum
- U.S. Historic district – Contributing property
- Area: less than one acre
- Built: 1889
- Architectural style: Queen Anne
- Part of: Cathedral Historic District (ID74001896)
- Designated CP: June 5, 1974

The Pettigrew Home & Museum is a historic house museum located at 131 North Duluth Avenue in the Cathedral Historic District of Sioux Falls, South Dakota. Built in 1889, it was once the home of United States Senator Richard Franklin Pettigrew, for whom it is now named. The home was later turned into a museum that is open to the public.

== History ==
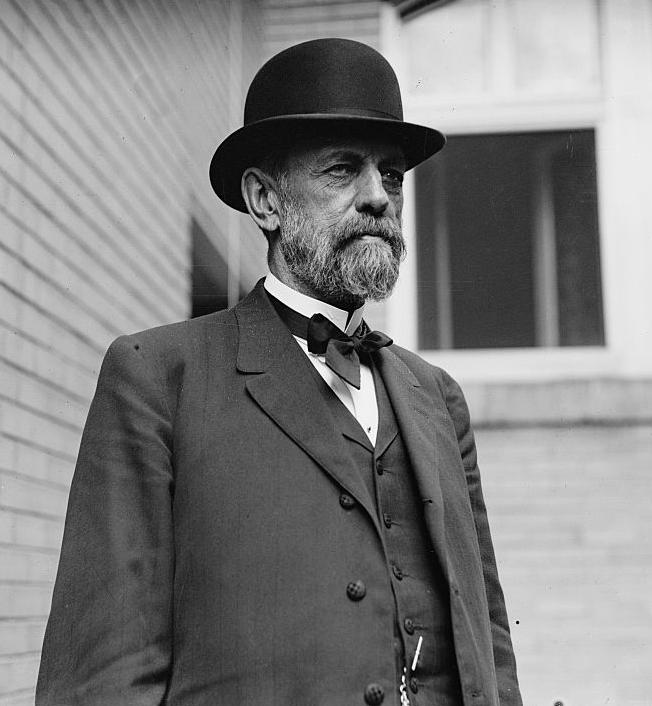
Richard Pettigrew, owner of the home from 1911 to 1926

In 1889, Thomas and Jenny McMartin had the home built for their family at the corner of 8th Street and North Duluth Avenue. Constructed in the Queen Anne style, the house is a red brick and Sioux quartzite building with two and a half stories. In 1911, the house passed to Richard Franklin Pettigrew, who bought it for $12,000. Pettigrew had moved to Sioux Falls in 1869, was an early member of the Dakota Territory House of Representatives, and became one of the first United States Senators from South Dakota upon its statehood in 1889. Outside of government, Pettigrew was a collector and amateur archaeologist, and travelled the world extensively. Throughout his life, he collected various items for a personal museum, later opening his collection to public viewing in 1925 in a gallery at the back of the house. Upon Pettigrew's death at his home on October 5, 1926, he willed the property to the city, along with his artifact collection. The city extended the building in 1934 to accommodate the collections. Curators of the museum inhabited the house with their families over the years.

On June 5, 1974, the home was listed as a contributing property as part of the Cathedral Historic District.

== Museum ==
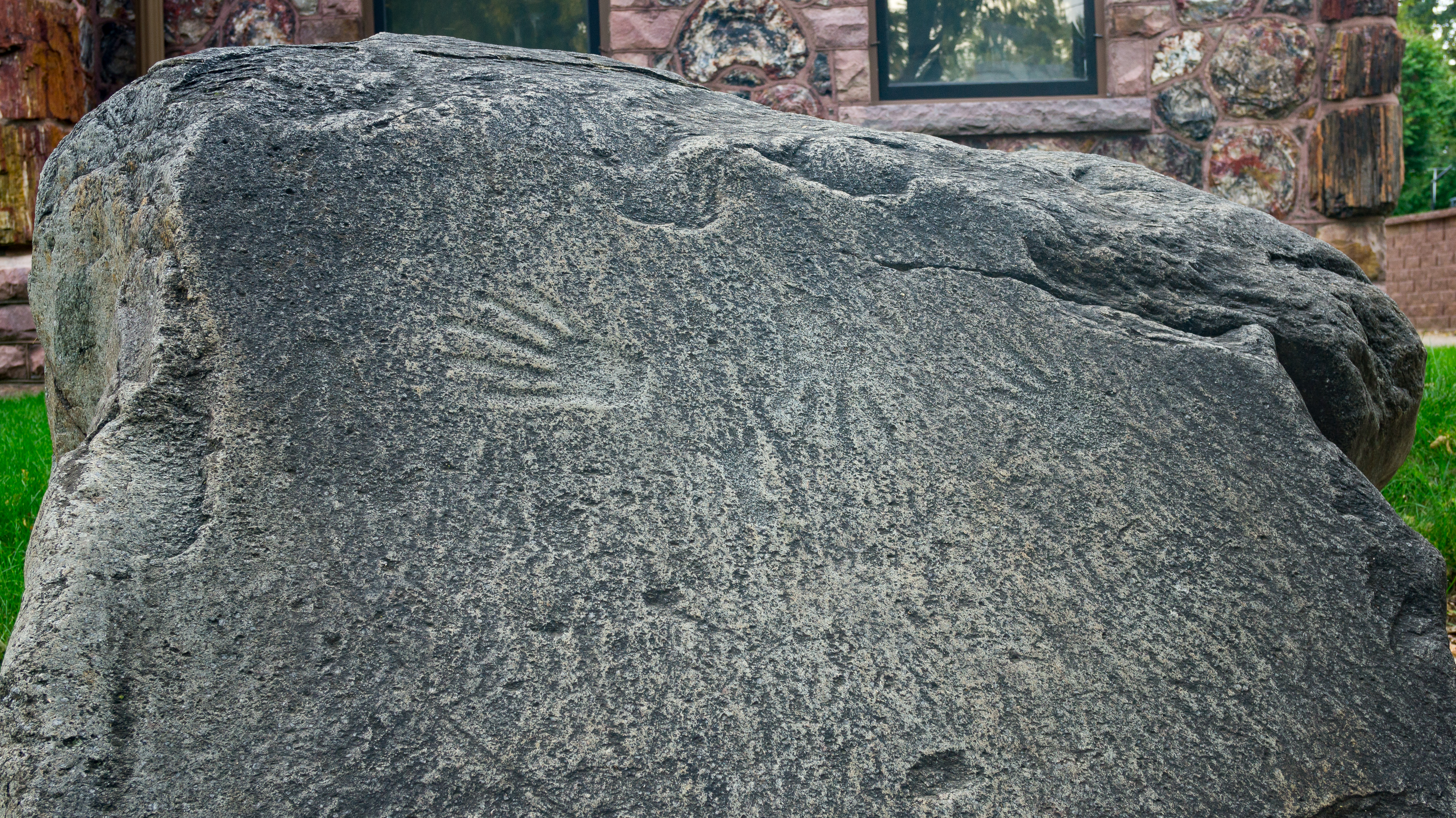
Prayer Rock Face on display at Pettigrew Home & Museum

The Pettigrew Home & Museum is operated by Siouxland Heritage Museums, which also operates the Old Courthouse Museum, free of charge and open to the public. The eclectic collections contain animal specimens, firearms, Native American artifacts and clothing, walking canes, and items related to Sioux Falls' early history. Some of the Native American artifacts came from Pettigrew's excavations at nearby burial mounds. Also among the items on display are a jar of water from the Jordan River, part of the Great Pyramid at Giza, a cane from Queen Liliʻuokalani, and Pettigrew's own indictment for sedition due to his opposition of the United States's entry into World War I.

Pettigrew also left behind a small library and his personal papers and letters on various subjects, including Pettigrew's views on government and politics, his business ventures, and the history of Sioux Falls. These were largely untouched and left in the attic until the 1980s, when the Federal Writers' Project compiled, catalogued, archived, and digitized them. The collection, still stored at the museum, is now known as the Richard F. Pettigrew Papers.
