= Oscar S. Gifford =

American politician

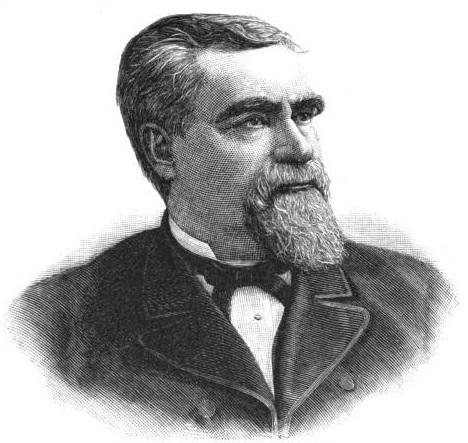

Member of the U.S. House of Representatives from South Dakota's at-large district
- In office November 2, 1889 – March 3, 1891
- Preceded by: Constituency established
- Succeeded by: John Rankin Gamble

Member of the U.S. House of Representatives from Dakota Territory's at-large district
- In office March 4, 1885 – March 3, 1889 (Delegate)
- Preceded by: John B. Raymond
- Succeeded by: George A. Mathews

Personal details
- Born: Oscar Sherman Gifford; October 20, 1842 Watertown, New York, U.S.
- Died: January 16, 1913 (aged 70) Canton, South Dakota, U.S.
- Party: Republican
- Occupation: Lawyer

Oscar Sherman Gifford (October 20, 1842 – January 16, 1913) was an American lawyer of Canton, South Dakota. He served six years in the United States House of Representatives, first as the non-voting delegate from the Dakota Territory, then as a full member of the House from South Dakota.

== Biography ==
Oscar was born in Watertown, Jefferson County, New York, and moved with his parents to Wisconsin, settling in Rock County and then in Brown County, Illinois. He served as a private in the Union during the American Civil War.

After the war, Gifford studied law and was admitted to the bar in 1871, beginning his practice in Canton, Dakota Territory (now South Dakota). He was district attorney for Lincoln County, mayor of Canton, and a member of the state constitutional convention of South Dakota which convened at Sioux Falls on September 7, 1883. He was a Republican, and was twice elected as the Territorial delegate to Congress, and served from March 4, 1885 to March 3, 1889.

Upon the admission of South Dakota as a state, it was allocated two seats in the U.S. House. Candidates ran at-large for Seat A or Seat B. Gifford was the first Congressman elected to Seat B, and served from November 2, 1889, to March 3, 1891. He was not a candidate for re-election in 1890, and resumed the practice of law in Canton. He was the first superintendent of the Canton Asylum for Insane Indians and resigned in 1908. He continued to live in Canton, where he died on January 16, 1913. He was interred in Forest Hill Cemetery in Canton.

U.S. House of Representatives
Preceded by John B. Raymond	Delegate to the U.S. House of Representatives from Dakota Territory; March 4, 1885 – March 3, 1889	Succeeded by George A. Mathews
Preceded by District created	Member of the U.S. House of Representatives from South Dakota's at-large congressional district November 2, 1889 – March 3, 1891	Succeeded by John Rankin Gamble
