= George A. Mathews =

American attorney and politician from South Dakota

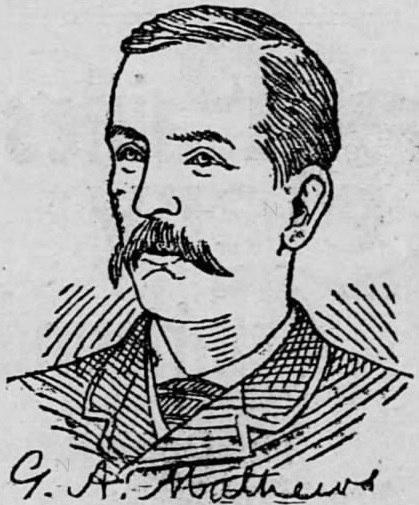
- The Saint Paul Globe (Saint Paul Globe, MN), April 7, 1888

Delegate to the United States House of Representatives from Dakota Territory
- In office March 4, 1889 – November 2, 1889
- Preceded by: Oscar S. Gifford
- Succeeded by: None (statehood achieved)

President of the Dakota Territorial Council
- In office 1887–1888
- Preceded by: J. H. Westover
- Succeeded by: Smith Stimmel

Member of the Dakota Territorial Council from the 7th District
- In office 1883–1888
- Preceded by: Elias McAuley
- Succeeded by: Ireneus Atkinson

Mayor of Brookings, South Dakota
- In office 1897–1903
- Preceded by: Alfred W. Hyde
- Succeeded by: John C. Jenkins
- In office 1887–1889
- Preceded by: Herman H. Natwick
- Succeeded by: William H. Roddle
- In office 1883–1884
- Preceded by: Asher A. Aiken
- Succeeded by: Herman H. Natwick

Personal details
- Born: June 4, 1852 Potsdam, New York, U.S.
- Died: April 19, 1941 (aged 88) Los Angeles, California, U.S.
- Resting place: Greenwood Cemetery, Brookings, South Dakota, U.S.
- Party: Republican
- Spouse(s): Cora M. Thomas (1881–1889); Bertha Harriet Van Dusen (m. 1892–1929)
- Children: 3
- Education: Upper Iowa University (B.S., 1874); University of Iowa (LL.B., 1878)
- Profession: Attorney

George Arthur Mathews (June 4, 1852 – April 19, 1941) was an American lawyer of Brookings, South Dakota. He was active in the government of the Dakota Territory, and was a territorial delegate to the United States House of Representatives.

== Early life ==
George A. Mathews was born in Potsdam, New York on June 4, 1852, the son of Amos Mathews and Silence A. (Folsom) Mathews. He was raised and educated in Potsdam until he was 13, when his family moved to Fayette, Iowa. After completing his early education in Fayette, Mathews studied at Upper Iowa University in Fayette, from which he graduated in 1874. He then studied law at the University of Iowa, from which he graduated in 1878. He was admitted to the bar in 1878 and commenced practice in Corning, Iowa.

== Career ==
Mathews moved to Brookings, Dakota Territory (now South Dakota) in 1879. In 1881, he was elected to Brookings' first city council. He served as mayor of Brookings from 1883 to 1884. In 1883, Mathews served on the commission that considered relocation of the territorial from Yankton. He proposed Huron as the most suitable site, but the majority voted for Bismarck. In 1884 he became prosecuting attorney of the fifth judicial circuit for the Territory of Dakota. In 1884, he was also elected to the Territorial council, and he was the council's president in 1887 and 1888. He was mayor of Brookings again from 1887 to 1889.

In 1888, Mathews was elected as a Republican to be the Territorial delegate to the U.S. House. He served from March 4, 1889, until November 2, 1889, when North and South Dakota were admitted into the Union. Because terms started in March, but congressional sessions began in November or December, Mathews did not travel to Washington, D.C. According to Francis Case, who eulogized Mathews in the U.S. House, because a change in presidential administrations occurred while Mathews was Dakota's delegate, he was flooded with applications for the territory's numerous federal patronage positions, including U.S. Marshal. Mathews and his law firm staff processed these applications and made hiring recommendations at Mathews' personal expense.

== Retirement and death ==
In 1890, Mathews' political supporters proposed him as a candidate for one of the new state's U.S. Senate seats, but he declined to run. Mathews resumed practicing law, and served again as mayor of Brookings from 1897 to 1903. In 1910 he retired and moved to Los Angeles, California. He died in Los Angeles on April 19, 1941, and was buried at Greenwood Cemetery in Brookings.

U.S. House of Representatives
Preceded by Oscar S. Gifford	Delegate to the United States House of Representatives from Dakota Territory; March 4, 1889 – November 2, 1889	Succeeded by statehood achieved
