= Charles Henry Turner (politician) =

American politician (1861–1913)

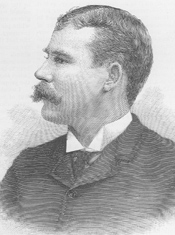

Doorkeeper of the United States House of Representatives
- In office 1891–1893
- Preceded by: Charles E. Adams
- Succeeded by: Alvin B. Hurt

Member of the U.S. House of Representatives from New York's 6th district
- In office December 9, 1889 – March 3, 1891
- Preceded by: Frank T. Fitzgerald
- Succeeded by: John R. Fellows

Personal details
- Born: May 26, 1861 Wentworth, New Hampshire, U.S.
- Died: August 31, 1913 (aged 52) Wentworth, New Hampshire, U.S.
- Resting place: Wentworth Cemetery, Wentworth, New Hampshire, U.S.
- Party: Democratic
- Education: Columbia University
- Occupation: Politician, lawyer

Charles Henry Turner (May 26, 1861 – August 31, 1913) was a U.S. representative from New York.

== Biography ==
Born in Wentworth, New Hampshire, Turner attended the common schools before moving to New York City in November 1879. He attended Columbia College there from 1886 to 1888, the year in which he unsuccessfully ran for State senator.

Turner was elected as a Democrat to the Fifty-first Congress to fill the vacancy caused by the resignation of Frank T. Fitzgerald and served from December 9, 1889, to March 3, 1891. He was not a candidate for renomination in 1890. Turner then served as Doorkeeper of the United States House of Representatives from 1891 to 1893.

Having studied Law, Turner was admitted to the bar in 1897 and commenced practice in Washington, D.C. He was appointed assistant district attorney for the District of Columbia on July 16, 1903, and served until his resignation on September 1, 1911. Soon after, on November 27, 1911, he was appointed as special assistant to the United States attorney for the District of Columbia, a position which he held until his death on August 31, 1913, in Wentworth, New Hampshire. He was interred in Wentworth Cemetery.

U.S. House of Representatives
Preceded by Frank T. Fitzgerald	Member of the U.S. House of Representatives from New York's 6th congressional district 1889–1891	Succeeded by John R. Fellows
