= Gideon C. Moody =

American judge

Gideon Curtis Moody
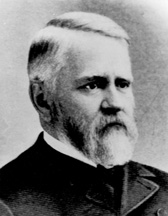

United States Senator from South Dakota
- In office November 2, 1889 – March 3, 1891
- Preceded by: (none)
- Succeeded by: James H. Kyle

Member of the Indiana House of Representatives
- In office 1861

Personal details
- Born: October 16, 1832 Cortland, New York
- Died: March 17, 1904 (aged 71) Los Angeles, California
- Party: Republican

Gideon Curtis Moody (October 16, 1832 – March 17, 1904) was an attorney and politician, elected in 1889 as a Republican United States Senator from South Dakota. He served two years. He also had served five years as an associate justice of the Dakota Territory Supreme Court, from 1878 to 1883, before entering private practice for a period as general counsel for Homestake Mine.

When South Dakota joined the Union on November 2, 1889, Moody, one of the two senators chosen by the state legislature, took office. In March 1891, his term was up.

== Biography ==
Born in Cortland, New York to Stephen and Charlotte Moody, who had migrated from Orange, Vermont, Moody attended the local common schools as a youth. He pursued an academic course. He studied law in Syracuse, New York. In 1852, he joined a westward migration and moved to Indiana, gaining admission to the bar there in 1853. He was appointed as prosecuting attorney for Floyd County, Indiana in 1854.

Now established, in 1855, he married Helen C. Eliot (1836–1927) in Indiana. They had five children together: Helen Eliot (1856–1940), married Mr. Dickinson; Charles C. (1858–1906), James Chaudoin (1862–1919), Burdette (1866–1946), and Warner Moody (1876–1906).

Entering politics, Moody was elected as a member of the Indiana House of Representatives in 1861. After the Civil War started, Moody enlisted as a volunteer with the Union Army. He was commissioned as a captain in April 1861 and was promoted during his service to lieutenant colonel and colonel before he resigned in March 1864.

Moody moved to Dakota Territory around 1865. There he was elected in 1867 as a Republican member of the Territorial House of Representatives. He served from 1867 -1869. Later, he was elected for another two-year term, serving 1874–1875. In the House, he was elected as speaker both in 1868–1869 and 1874–1875.

In 1878, Moody was appointed as an associate justice of the Dakota Territory Supreme Court, serving until 1883. He also served as a member of the constitutional conventions of South Dakota in 1883 and 1885.

In 1883, he resigned his judicial position to enter private practice, hired as general attorney for the Homestake Mine.

Upon admission of South Dakota as a State into the Union on November 2, 1889, Gideon Moody was elected by the state legislature (the process at the time) as a Republican to the U.S. Senate. The other senator elected was Richard F. Pettigrew. They each served the remainder of that session of Congress, from November 2, 1889, until March 3, 1891. Moody was an unsuccessful candidate for reelection as senator.

Gideon C. Moody later moved to California. He died there at age 71 in Los Angeles. He is interred in Angelus-Rosedale Cemetery.

== Legacy and honors ==
When organized in 1873, Moody County, South Dakota was named for him.

U.S. Senate
Preceded by None	U.S. senator (Class 3) from South Dakota; 1889–1891; Served alongside: Richard F. Pettigrew	Succeeded by James H. Kyle
