= Richard F. Pettigrew =

American politician (1848–1926)

Richard Franklin Pettigrew
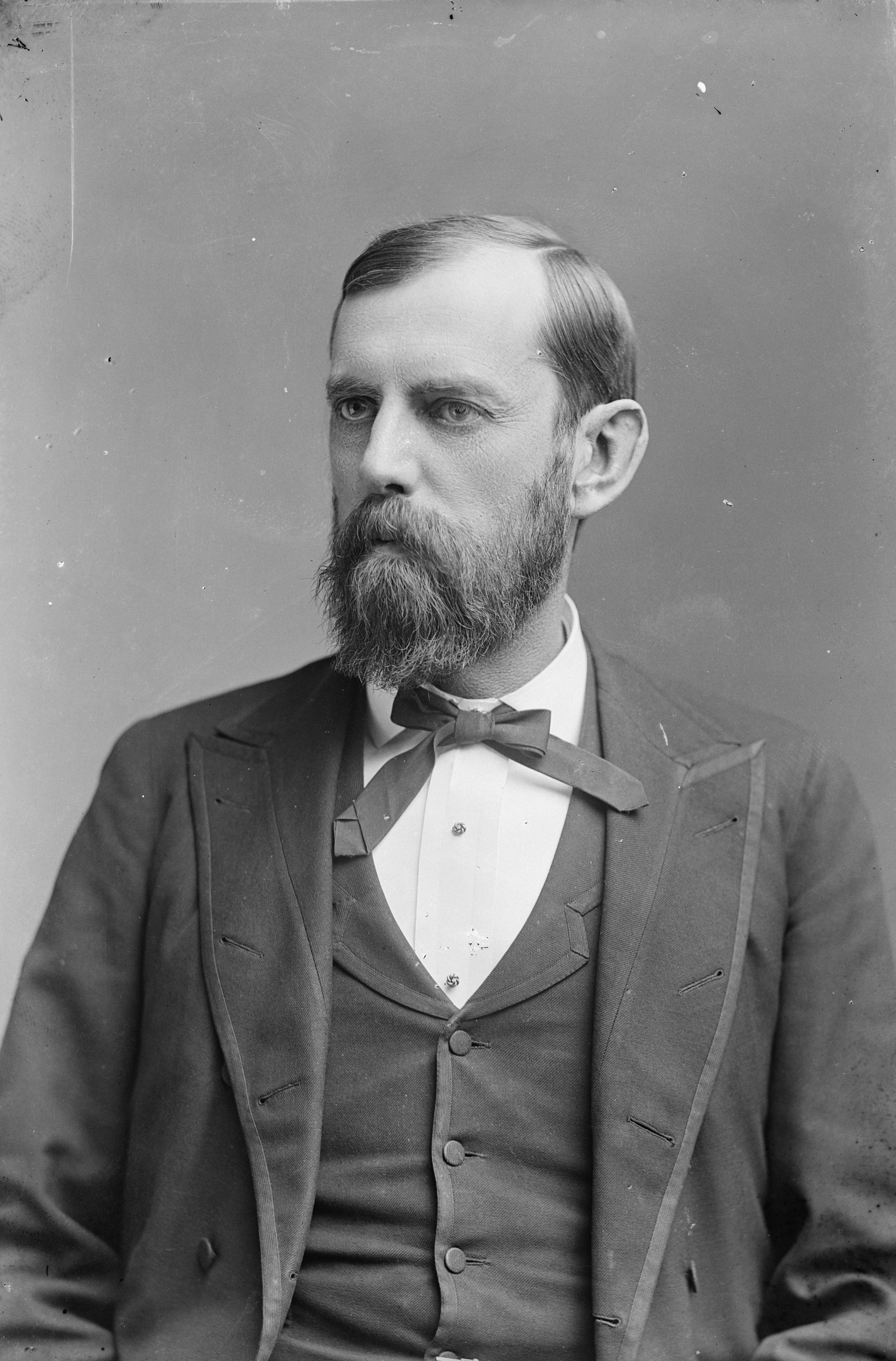
- Portrait by C. M. Bell, c. 1891–1894
- In office November 2, 1889 – March 3, 1901
- Preceded by: none
- Succeeded by: Robert J. Gamble

Member of the U.S. House of Representatives from Dakota Territory's at-large district
- In office March 4, 1881 – March 3, 1883; Delegate
- Preceded by: Granville G. Bennett
- Succeeded by: John B. Raymond

Personal details
- Born: July 23, 1848 Ludlow, Vermont, U.S.
- Died: October 5, 1926 (aged 78) Sioux Falls, South Dakota, U.S.
- Party: Republican (until 1896); Silver Republican (1896-1901)
- Other political affiliations: "Fusion" Populist (1900)
- Relatives: Belle L. Pettigrew (sister)
- Education: Beloit College; University of Wisconsin Law School

Richard Franklin Pettigrew (July 23, 1848 – October 5, 1926) was an American lawyer, surveyor, and land developer. He represented the Dakota Territory in the U.S. Congress and, after the Dakotas were admitted as States, he was the first U.S. Senator from South Dakota.

== Early life and education ==
Pettigrew was born to Andrew Jr. Pettigrew and Hannah B. Sawtelle on July 23, 1848, in Ludlow, Windsor County, Vermont, in the residences of his grandparents, parents, seven siblings, uncles, aunts and cousins. He was the sixth child produced out of nine total. Pettigrew's siblings included Hannah M., Alma Jane, Henrietta Adelaide, Luella Belle, Justin A., Frederick (Fred) Wallace, Elizabeth Medora, and Harlan Page. In 1853, Andrew Jr. sold his store to the partnership of Emerson and Richards, and the family moved to Wisconsin in 1854 when Pettigrew was six years old. Andrew Jr. moved the family because of his neighbors' tough anti-slavery beliefs, and the store was used for the circulation of anti-slavery literature. The store was boycotted by angry pro-slavers who threatened the Pettigrew family with violence.

The family settled in Rock County, near Union, Wisconsin. Pettigrew attended Evansville Academy, in Evansville. In 1866, Pettigrew went to Beloit to enroll in Beloit College. In the winter of 1868, Pettigrew entered law school at the University of Wisconsin–Madison.

== Career in the Dakotas ==
Pettigrew moved to Dakota Territory in 1869 to work with a United States deputy surveyor. He settled in Sioux Falls, where he practiced law and engaged in surveying and real estate. He was a member of the territorial House of Representatives and served on the Territorial council. He was elected as a Republican to the U.S. House, serving from March 4, 1881, to March 3, 1883. He was an unsuccessful candidate for reelection in 1882 but returned to the territorial council from 1885 to 1889.

Pettigrew was also instrumental in the founding of many local communities around Sioux Falls by donating land. Pettigrew and his wife, Bessie, donated land in 1886 to aid the founding and development of Granite, Iowa, in Lyon County. In 1888, he and S. L. Tate both donated more land and were responsible for the founding of South Sioux Falls. Pettigrew wanted to build a suburb of Sioux Falls to the south and west.

== U.S. Senate ==
When South Dakota was admitted as a state, Pettigrew was elected as South Dakota's first Senator to the United States Senate. He served from November 2, 1889, to March 3, 1901. He introduced a bill to fund the structure, recommending that native Sioux quartzite be used for construction of the state's first Federal building. He was re-elected in 1894, but left the Republican Party on June 17, 1896, to join the Silver Republicans, a faction of the Republican Party that opposed the party's position in support of the monetary gold standard. He was an unsuccessful candidate for reelection in 1900. Pettigrew was a strong opponent of President William McKinley's attempt to annex the Republic of Hawaii against the wish of its many native residents. In a congressional speech, he stated:

"The American flag went up on Hawaii in dishonor; it came down in honor, and if it goes up again now it will go up in infamy and shame and this Government will join the robber nations of the world."

His speech about Hawaii and annexation were at odds with some of his other views, namely in Federal Indian policy. Pettigrew was a supporter of a bill that sought to unilaterally dissolve tribal governments so as to force them to agree to allotment of their lands. In 1897, he delivered a speech on the Senate floor saying:

"There is no question but that the Congress of the United States at one blow should not only provide that laws passed by those councils, by those governments, should be approved by the President before they go into force, but, on the contrary, that the [tribal] governments themselves should be destroyed; that their power to legislate should be taken away; that their courts should be ousted and a proper judicial system furnished to those people. It is our duty to do it."

In the Presidential Election of 1900, while still in the Senate, he was a delegate and a major figure in the national political convention of the "Fusion" wing of the Populist Party held in Sioux Falls that convened on May 9, 1900, and lasted three days. The party endorsed William Jennings Bryan as its candidate.

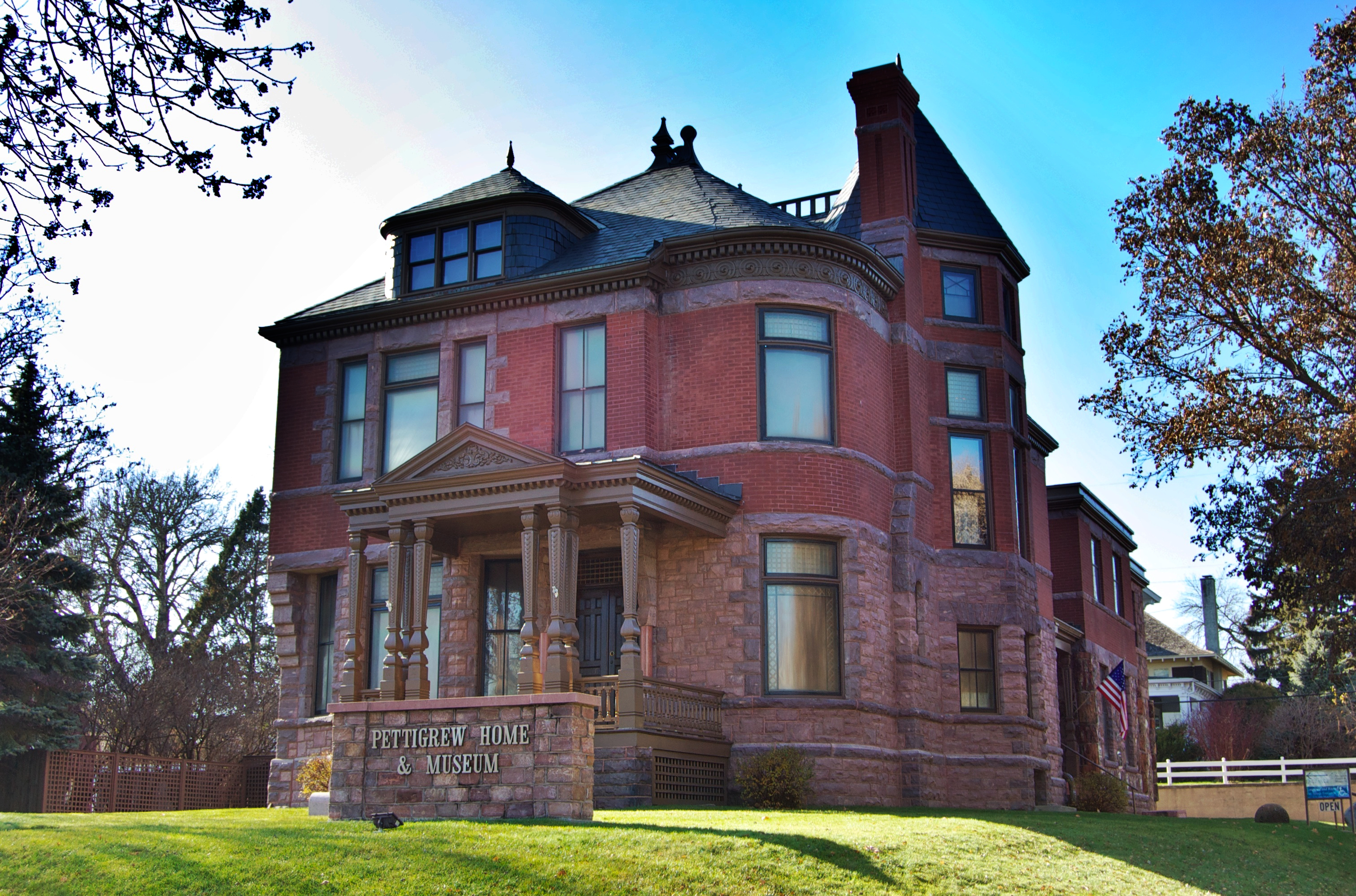
Pettigrew's home in Sioux Falls as it appears today.

== Indictment ==
In 1917, in an interview published in the Argus Leader, Pettigrew said that World War I was a capitalist scheme to further enrich the wealthy, and urged young men to evade the draft. The local United States Attorney indicted of Pettigrew for violating the Espionage Act of 1917. This was the same charge for which Socialist leader Eugene V. Debs had received a ten-year Federal prison sentence.

Pettigrew assembled a high-powered legal defense team headed up by his close personal friend, prominent attorney Clarence Darrow. The trial was repeatedly delayed, and eventually the charge against him was dropped.

Pettigrew had the formal document of indictment framed, and prominently displayed it in his home next to a framed copy of the United States Declaration of Independence. There it remains to this day as part of the exhibits of the Pettigrew Home & Museum.

== Later life and death ==
After his time in the Senate, Pettigrew first practiced law in New York City, but soon returned to Sioux Falls and was active in politics and business until his death in that city. He was interred in Woodlawn Cemetery in Sioux Falls.

Pettigrew left his home to the city of Sioux Falls in his will. The Pettigrew Home & Museum is maintained by the city of Sioux Falls to this day, designed to emulate how a person of Pettigrew's stature would have lived at the turn of the century. The house is filled with antiques from the early 1900s and Pettigrew's personal collection of artifacts from his time as an amateur archaeologist.

Announced January 12, 2009, Richard F. Pettigrew Elementary School opened in fall of 2009 in southwest Sioux Falls.

== Works ==
- "Who Owns the United States?" International Socialist Review, vol. 17, no. 6 (December 1916), pp. 357–359.
- The Course of Empire. New York: Boni & Liveright, 1920. (Anti-imperialist speeches)
- Imperial Washington: The Story of American Public Life from 1870 to 1920. Chicago: Charles H. Kerr & Co., 1922. Originally published as Triumphant Plutocracy: The Story of American Public Life from 1870 to 1920.

== Quotes ==
All quotes are from Pettigrew's book Triumphant Plutocracy.

- "Capital is stolen labor and its only function is to steal more labor."
- "The early years of the century marked the progress of the race toward individual freedom and permanent victory over the tyranny of hereditary aristocracy, but the closing decades of the century have witnessed the surrender of all that was gained to the more heartless tyranny of accumulated wealth."
- "Under the ethics of his profession the lawyer is the only man who can take a bribe and call it a fee."
- "Instead of spending hundreds of millions in conquering the Philippines, it would have been far better economy and better business judgment to spend it in reclaiming the arid lands of the west."
- "The sum and substance of the conquest of the Philippines is to find a field where cheap labor can be secured, labor that does not strike, that does not belong to a union, that does not need an army to keep it in leading strings, that will make goods for the trusts of this country."
- "It had come into being as a protest against slavery and as the special champion of the Declaration of Independence, it would go out of being and out of power as the champion of slavery and the repudiator of the Declaration of Independence." --–On the Republican Party.
- "The Russian Revolution is the greatest event of our times. It marks the beginning of the epoch when the working people will assume the task of directing and controlling industry. It blazes a path into this unknown country, where the workers of the world are destined to take from their exploiters the right to control and direct the economic affairs of the community."

== See also ==
- List of United States senators who switched parties

U.S. House of Representatives
Preceded by Granville G. Bennett	Delegate to the U.S. House of Representatives from Dakota Territory's at-large congressional district March 4, 1881 – March 3, 1883	Succeeded by John B. Raymond
U.S. Senate
Preceded by None	U.S. senator (Class 2) from South Dakota; 1889–1901; Served alongside: Gideon C. Moody, James H. Kyle	Succeeded by Robert J. Gamble
