= 1890 United States House of Representatives elections =

House elections for the 52nd U.S. Congress

- June 3, 1890 – November 4, 1890

All 332 seats in the United States House of Representatives 167 seats needed for a majority
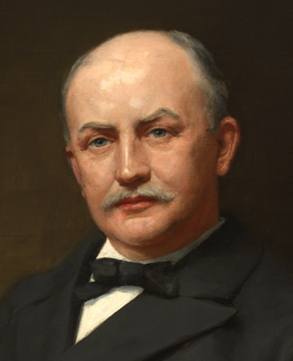

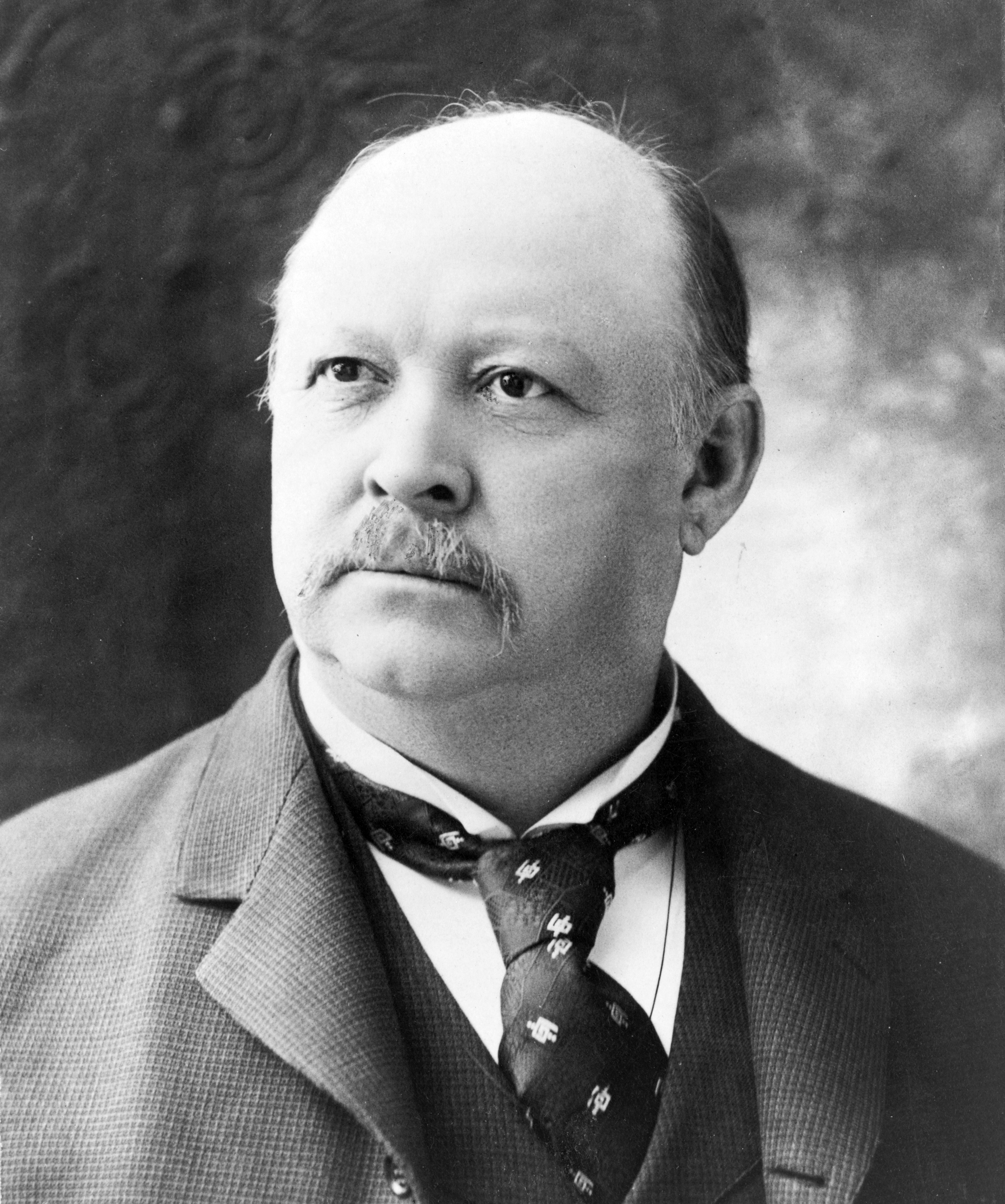

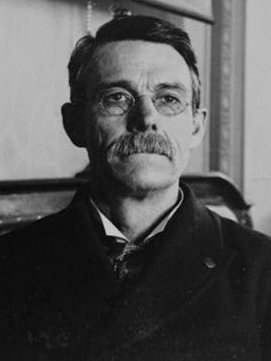
	Majority party	Minority party	Third party
Leader	Charles F. Crisp	Thomas Brackett Reed	Jerry Simpson
Party	Democratic	Republican	Populist
Leader's seat	Georgia 3rd	Maine 1st	Kansas 7th
Last election	152 seats	179 seats	0 seats
Seats won	238 (Note: Dubin (pp. 293–94) counts 235 Democrats, 88 Republicans, and 8 Populists at the opening of the 52nd Congress.)	86	8
Seat change	▲86	▼93	▲8
Popular vote	4,945,756	4,173,605	182,797
Percentage	50.71%	42.80%	1.87%
Swing	▲2.03pp	▼4.56pp	New party
- Results: Democratic gain Republican gain Democratic hold Republican hold Populist gain
Speaker before election
Thomas Reed
Republican
Elected Speaker
Charles Crisp
Democratic

The 1890 United States House of Representatives elections were held for the most part on November 4, 1890, with five states holding theirs early in between June and October. They occurred in the middle of President Benjamin Harrison's term. Elections were held for 332 seats of the United States House of Representatives, representing 44 states, to serve in the 52nd United States Congress. Special elections were also held throughout the year.

A stagnant economy which became worse after the Panic of 1890, combined with a lack of support for then-Representative William McKinley's (defeated in the election) steep tariff act, which favored large industries at the expense of consumers, led to a sharp defeat for Harrison's Republican Party, giving a large majority to the Democratic Party and presaging Harrison's defeat in the 1892 United States presidential election. The Republican-controlled Congress was highly criticized for its lavish spending, and it earned the unflattering nickname of The Billion Dollar Congress. The Democrats promised to cut the outlandish budget.

Aggressive Republican promotion of controversial English-only education laws enacted by Wisconsin and Illinois in 1889, accompanied by a surge in nativist and anti-Catholic sentiment within the state parties, had greatly hollowed out the party's support base in these former strongholds. A rare multi-confessional alliance of mainly German clergy rallied their flocks in defense of language and faith to the Democratic Party, which tore through incumbent Republican majorities in both states, capturing a total of 11 formerly Republican seats between them alone. Bitterly divisive struggles over temperance laws had also been alienating immigrants from the increasingly prohibitionist Republican Party across the Midwest more broadly. Dramatic losses in the previous year's gubernatorial elections in Iowa and Ohio (which would lose another 14 Republican congressional seats between them during this election) were due in no small part to wet immigrant communities, especially Germans, expressing their resentment toward Republican efforts to ban or otherwise curtail alcohol consumption by throwing their support behind the Democratic candidates.

This election also saw the Populist Party, a coalition of farmers and laborers who wanted to overhaul the nation's financial system, make a small mark on Congress.

== Special elections ==
- Kentucky 6: June 21, 1890: William W. Dickerson (D) elected to finish the term of John G. Carlisle (D), who had resigned May 26, 1890 when elected U.S. senator. Democratic hold. Dickerson: 8,412 (63.95%), Wesley M. Rardin (R) 4,742 (36.05%).
- California 1: December 9, 1890: Thomas J. Geary (D) elected to finish the term of John J. De Haven (R), who had resigned October 1, 1890. Democratic gain.
- Iowa 7
- Missouri 14: James P. Walker (D) died July 19, 1890, and Robert H. Whitelaw (D) was elected November 4, 1890. Democratic hold.

== Election summaries ==
↓
238	8	86
Democratic	P	Republican

State	Type	Total seats	Democratic		Populist		Republican	
State	Type	Total seats	Seats	Change	Seats	Change	Seats	Change
Alabama	District	8	8	▲1	0	Steady	0	▼1
Arkansas	District	5	5	▲2	0	▼1 (Note: One Labor Party member had been elected in 1888.)	0	▼1
California	District	6	2	Steady	0	Steady	4	Steady
Colorado	At-large	1	0	Steady	0	Steady	1	Steady
Connecticut	District	4	3	▲2	0	Steady	1	▼2
Delaware	At-large	1	1	Steady	0	Steady	0	Steady
Florida	District	2	2	Steady	0	Steady	0	Steady
Georgia	District	10	10	Steady	0	Steady	0	Steady
Idaho (Note: Elections held early.)	At-large	1	0	Steady	0	Steady	1	Steady
Illinois	District	20	14	▲7	0	Steady	6	▼7
Indiana	District	13	11	▲1	0	Steady	2	▼1
Iowa	District	11	6	▲5	0	Steady	5	▼5
Kansas	District	7	0	Steady	5	▲5	2	▼5
Kentucky	District	11	10	▲1	0	Steady	1	▼1
Louisiana	District	6	6	▲1	0	Steady	0	▼1
Maine	District	4	0	Steady	0	Steady	4	Steady
Maryland	District	6	6	▲3	0	Steady	0	▼3
Massachusetts	District	12	7	▲5	0	Steady	5	▼5
Michigan	District	11	8	▲6	0	Steady	3	▼6
Minnesota	District	5	3	▲3	1	▲1	1	▼4
Mississippi	District	7	7	Steady	0	Steady	0	Steady
Missouri	District	14	14	▲4	0	Steady	0	▼4
Montana	At-large	1	1	▲1	0	Steady	0	▼1
Nebraska	District	3	1	▲1	2	▲2	0	▼3
Nevada	At-large	1	0	Steady	0	Steady	1	Steady
New Hampshire	District	2	2	▲2	0	Steady	0	▼2
New Jersey	District	7	5	▲2	0	Steady	2	▼2
New York	District	34	23	▲8	0	Steady	11	▼8
North Carolina	District	9	8	▲2	0	Steady	1	▼2
North Dakota	At-large	1	0	Steady	0	Steady	1	Steady
Ohio	District	21	14	▲9	0	Steady	7	▼9
Oregon	At-large	1	0	Steady	0	Steady	1	Steady
Pennsylvania	District	28	11	▲4	0	Steady	17	▼4
Rhode Island	District	2	2	▲2	0	Steady	0	▼2
South Carolina	District	7	7	Steady	0	Steady	0	Steady
South Dakota	At-large	2	0	Steady	0	Steady	2	Steady
Tennessee	District	10	8	▲1	0	Steady	2	▼1
Texas	District	11	11	Steady	0	Steady	0	Steady
Vermont	District	2	0	Steady	0	Steady	2	Steady
Virginia	District	10	10	▲4	0	Steady	0	▼4
Washington	At-large	1	0	Steady	0	Steady	1	Steady
West Virginia	District	4	4	▲2	0	Steady	0	▼2
Wisconsin	District	9	8	▲6	0	Steady	1	▼6
Wyoming	At-large	1	0	Steady	0	Steady	1	Steady
Total		332	238 71.7%	▲74	8 2.4%	▲9	86 25.9%	▼83

Popular vote
Democratic	50.71%
Republican	42.80%
Populist	1.87%
Others	4.62%

House seats
Democratic	71.69%
Republican	25.90%
Populist	2.41%

The previous election of 1888 saw the election of one Labor Party representative in Arkansas.

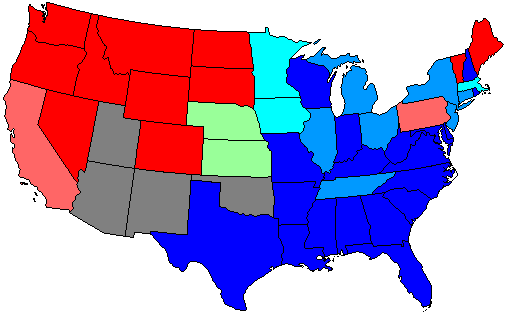
House seats by party holding plurality in state: 80+% Democratic / / 80+% Republican; 60+% to 80% Democratic / 60+% to 80% Populist / 60+% to 80% Republican; Up to 60% Democratic / / Up to 60% Republican

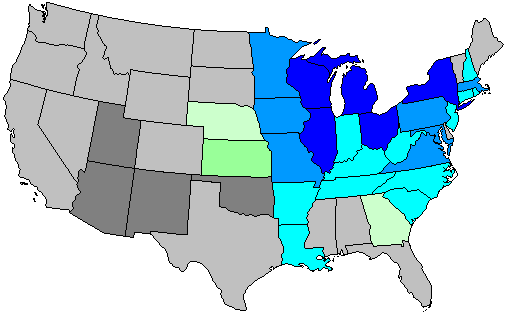
Net gain in party representation: 6+ Democratic gain / / 6+ Republican gain; 3–5 Democratic gain / 3–5 Populist gain / 3–5 Republican gain; 1–2 Democratic gain / 1–2 Populist gain / 1–2 Republican gain; no net change

== Early election dates ==
In 1890, five states, with 9 seats among them, held elections early:

- June 3 Oregon
- September 2 Vermont
- September 8 Maine
- September 11 Idaho
- October 1 Wyoming

Idaho and Wyoming held elections for both the outgoing 51st Congress and the incoming 52nd Congress in 1890, having been admitted that year, and held future elections on the standard election day.

== Alabama ==
District	Incumbent			This race	
District	Member	Party	First elected	Results	Candidates
Alabama 1	Richard H. Clarke	Democratic	1888	Incumbent re-elected.	▌ ✓ Richard H. Clarke (Democratic) 69.89%; ▌Frank H. Threatt (Republican) 16.99%; ▌Andrew J. Warner (Independent) 13.12%
Alabama 2	Hilary A. Herbert	Democratic	1876	Incumbent re-elected.	▌ ✓ Hilary A. Herbert (Democratic) 79.83%; ▌S.A. Pilley (Republican) 20.17%
Alabama 3	William C. Oates	Democratic	1880	Incumbent re-elected.	▌ ✓ William C. Oates (Democratic) 91.70%; ▌J.R. Treadwell (Republican) 8.31%
Alabama 4	J. V. McDuffie	Republican	1888 (contested)	Incumbent lost re-election. Democratic gain.	▌ ✓ Louis W. Turpin (Democratic) 52.08%; ▌J. V. McDuffie (Republican) 26.76%; ▌G.T. McCall (Independent) 21.16%
Alabama 5	James E. Cobb	Democratic	1886	Incumbent re-elected.	▌ ✓ James E. Cobb (Democratic) 100.00%
Alabama 6	John H. Bankhead	Democratic	1886	Incumbent re-elected.	▌ ✓ John H. Bankhead (Democratic) 95.21%; ▌W.H. Davidson (Republican) 4.79%
Alabama 7	William H. Forney	Democratic	1874	Incumbent re-elected.	▌ ✓ William H. Forney (Democratic) 59.23%; ▌W.O. Butler (Independent) 35.70%; ▌A.J. Logan (Republican) 5.08%
Alabama 8	Joseph Wheeler	Democratic	1880	Incumbent re-elected.	▌ ✓ Joseph Wheeler (Democratic) 58.21%; ▌R.W. Austin (Republican) 41.79%

== Arkansas ==
District	Incumbent			This race	
District	Member	Party	First elected	Results	Candidates
Arkansas 1	Lewis P. Featherstone	Labor	1888 (contested)	Incumbent lost re-election. Democratic gain.	▌ ✓ William H. Cate (Democratic) 51.00%; ▌Lewis P. Featherstone (Labor) 49.00%
Arkansas 2	Clifton R. Breckinridge	Democratic	1882	Incumbent re-elected.	▌ ✓ Clifton R. Breckinridge (Democratic) 51.07%; ▌Isom P. Langley (Republican) 48.93%
Arkansas 3	Thomas C. McRae	Democratic	1885 (special)	Incumbent re-elected.	▌ ✓ Thomas C. McRae (Democratic) 96.56%; W.M. White 2.11%; Others 1.33%
Arkansas 4	John Henry Rogers	Democratic	1882	Incumbent retired. Democratic hold.	▌ ✓ William L. Terry (Democratic) 62.85%; ▌E.M. Harrison (Republican) 37.15%
Arkansas 5	Samuel W. Peel	Democratic	1882	Incumbent re-elected.	▌ ✓ Samuel W. Peel (Democratic) 97.41%; Others 2.59%

== California ==
District	Incumbent			This race	
District	Member	Party	First elected	Results	Candidates
California 1	Vacant			Incumbent resigned October 1, 1890. Democratic gain.	▌ ✓ Thomas J. Geary (Democratic) 49.3%; ▌John A. Barham (Republican) 48.8%; ▌L. B. Scranton (Prohibition) 1.9%
California 2	Marion Biggs	Democratic	1886	Incumbent retired. Democratic hold.	▌ ✓ Anthony Caminetti (Democratic) 49%; ▌George I. Blanchard (Republican) 48.6%; ▌J. S. Witherell (Prohibition) 2.4%
California 3	Joseph McKenna	Republican	1884	Incumbent re-elected.	▌ ✓ Joseph McKenna (Republican) 55.4%; ▌John P. Irish (Democratic) 42.5%; ▌O. O. Felkner (Prohibition) 2.1%
California 4	William W. Morrow	Republican	1884	Incumbent retired. Republican hold.	▌ ✓ John T. Cutting (Republican) 49.2%; ▌Robert Ferral (Democratic) 45.1%; ▌Thomas V. Cator (Socialist) 5.6%; ▌Joseph Rowell (Prohibition) 0.2%
California 5	Thomas J. Clunie	Democratic	1888	Incumbent lost re-election. Republican gain.	▌ ✓ Eugene F. Loud (Republican) 52.8%; ▌Thomas J. Clunie (Democratic) 45.9%; ▌E. F. Howe (Prohibition) 1.3%
California 6	William Vandever	Republican	1886	Incumbent retired. Republican hold.	▌ ✓ William W. Bowers (Republican) 51.1%; ▌W. J. Curtis (Democratic) 44.1%; ▌O. R. Dougherty (Prohibition) 4.8%

== Colorado ==
District	Incumbent			This race	
District	Member	Party	First elected	Results	Candidates
Colorado at-large	Hosea Townsend	Republican	1888	Incumbent re-elected.	▌ ✓ Hosea Townsend (Republican) 51.3%; ▌T. J. O'Donnell (Democratic) 41.3%; ▌J. D. Burr (Independent) 12.0%

== Connecticut ==
District	Incumbent			This race	
District	Member	Party	First elected	Results	Candidates
Connecticut 1	William E. Simonds	Republican	1888	Incumbent lost re-election. Democratic gain.	▌ ✓ Lewis Sperry (Democratic) 47.5%; ▌William E. Simonds (Republican) 49.7%; ▌Frederick G. Platt (Prohibition) 2.7%
Connecticut 2	Washington F. Willcox	Democratic	1888	Incumbent re-elected.	▌ ✓ Washington F. Willcox (Democratic) 52.9%; ▌Josiah M. Hubbard (Republican) 44.9%; ▌Charles F. Whittemore (Prohibition) 2.2%
Connecticut 3	Charles A. Russell	Republican	1886	Incumbent re-elected.	▌ ✓ Charles A. Russell (Republican) 50.7%; ▌David A. Wells (Democratic) 45.9%; ▌Herbert J. Crocker (Prohibition) 3.3%
Connecticut 4	Frederick Miles	Republican	1888	Incumbent lost re-election. Democratic gain.	▌ ✓ Robert E. De Forest (Democratic) 50.2%; ▌Frederick Miles (Republican) 47.7%; ▌Lyman D. Baldwin (Prohibition) 2.1%

== Delaware ==
District	Incumbent			This race	
District	Member	Party	First elected	Results	Candidates
Delaware at-large	John B. Penington	Democratic	1886	Incumbent retired. Democratic hold.	▌ ✓ John W. Causey (Democratic) 50.6%; ▌Henry P. Carmon (Republican) 48.7%; ▌Daniel M. Green (Prohibition) 0.7%

== Florida ==
District	Incumbent			This race	
District	Member	Party	First elected	Results	Candidates
Florida 1	Robert H. M. Davidson	Democratic	1876	Incumbent lost renomination. Democratic hold.	▌ ✓ Stephen Mallory II (Democratic) 78.5%; ▌Harrison Reed (Republican) 21.5%
Florida 2	Robert Bullock	Democratic	1888	Incumbent re-elected.	▌ ✓ Robert Bullock (Democratic) 58.8%; ▌Joseph Stripling (Republican) 41.2%

== Georgia ==
District	Incumbent			This race	
District	Member	Party	First elected	Results	Candidates
Georgia 1	Rufus E. Lester	Democratic	1888	Incumbent re-elected.	▌ ✓ Rufus E. Lester (Democratic) 77.72%; ▌Michael G. Doyle (Republican) 22.29%
Georgia 2	Henry G. Turner	Democratic	1880	Incumbent re-elected.	▌ ✓ Henry G. Turner (Democratic) 88.59%; ▌C.B. Matterson (Republican) 11.41%
Georgia 3	Charles F. Crisp	Democratic	1882	Incumbent re-elected.	▌ ✓ Charles F. Crisp (Democratic) 86.56%; ▌Peter O. Gibson (Republican) 13.44%
Georgia 4	Thomas W. Grimes	Democratic	1886	Incumbent lost renomination. Democratic hold.	▌ ✓ Charles L. Moses (Democratic) 73.65%; ▌Walter L. Johnson (Republican) 26.35%
Georgia 5	John D. Stewart	Democratic	1886	Incumbent lost renomination. Democratic hold.	▌ ✓ Leonidas F. Livingston (Democratic) 70.66%; ▌Will Haight (Republican) 29.34%
Georgia 6	James Henderson Blount	Democratic	1872	Incumbent re-elected.	▌ ✓ James Henderson Blount (Democratic) 100.00%
Georgia 7	Judson C. Clements	Democratic	1880	Incumbent lost renomination. Democratic hold.	▌ ✓ Robert W. Everett (Democratic) 54.80%; ▌William Harrell Felton (Ind. Democratic) 42.03%; ▌Zack B. Hargrove (Republican) 3.17%
Georgia 8	Henry H. Carlton	Democratic	1886	Incumbent did not seek re-election. Democratic hold.	▌ ✓ Thomas G. Lawson (Democratic) 100.00%
Georgia 9	Allen D. Candler	Democratic	1882	Incumbent did not seek re-election. Democratic hold.	▌ ✓ Thomas E. Winn (Democratic) 58.83%; ▌Thaddeus Pickett (Independent) 23.31%; ▌Sion A. Darnell (Republican) 17.87%
Georgia 10	George Barnes	Democratic	1884	Incumbent lost renomination. Democratic hold.	▌ ✓ Thomas E. Watson (Democratic) 90.14%; ▌Anthony E. Williams (Republican) 9.86%

== Idaho ==
Results by county: Sweet: 50–60%; 60–70%; Mayhew: 50–60%

There were two elections to the new state of Idaho.

=== 51st Congress ===
District	Incumbent			This race	
District	Member	Party	First elected	Results	Candidates
Idaho at-large	New district			New seat. Republican gain.	▌ ✓ Willis Sweet (Republican) 55.80%; ▌Alex E. Mayhew (Democratic) 44.20%

=== 52nd Congress ===
District	Incumbent			This race	
District	Member	Party	First elected	Results	Candidates
Idaho at-large	Willis Sweet	Republican	1890	Incumbent re-elected.	▌ ✓ James B. Belford (Republican) 55.79%; ▌Alex E. Mayhew (Democratic) 44.21%

== Illinois ==
District	Incumbent			This race	
District	Member	Party	First elected	Results	Candidates
Illinois 1	Abner Taylor	Republican	1888	Incumbent re-elected.	▌ ✓ Abner Taylor (Republican) 49.95%; ▌William G. Ewing (Democratic) 48.96%; ▌Isaac H. Pedrick (Prohibition) 1.09%
Illinois 2	Frank Lawler	Democratic	1884	Incumbent did not seek re-election. Democratic hold.	▌ ✓ Lawrence E. McGann (Democratic) 60.39%; ▌John G. Schaar (Republican) 36.94%; ▌William Bentley (Prohibition) 2.67%
Illinois 3	William E. Mason	Republican	1886	Incumbent lost re-election. Democratic gain.	▌ ✓ Allan C. Durborow Jr. (Democratic) 53.66%; ▌William E. Mason (Republican) 45.67%; ▌Joseph L. Whitlock (Prohibition) 0.67%
Illinois 4	George E. Adams	Republican	1882	Incumbent lost re-election. Democratic gain.	▌ ✓ Walter C. Newberry (Democratic) 50.10%; ▌George E. Adams (Republican) 48.43%; ▌Samuel W. Packer (Prohibition) 1.48%
Illinois 5	Albert J. Hopkins	Republican	1885 (special)	Incumbent re-elected.	▌ ✓ Albert J. Hopkins (Republican) 59.69%; ▌Jacob Haish (Democratic) 36.41%; ▌Frederick F. Farmiloe (Prohibition) 3.90%
Illinois 6	Robert R. Hitt	Republican	1882 (special)	Incumbent re-elected.	▌ ✓ Robert R. Hitt (Republican) 50.93%; ▌Andrew Ashton (Democratic) 49.07%
Illinois 7	Thomas J. Henderson	Republican	1874	Incumbent re-elected.	▌ ✓ Thomas J. Henderson (Republican) 53.81%; ▌John W. Blee (Democratic) 43.12%; ▌David E. Holmes (Prohibition) 3.08%
Illinois 8	Charles A. Hill	Republican	1888	Incumbent lost re-election. Democratic gain.	▌ ✓ Lewis Steward (Democratic) 49.41%; ▌Charles A. Hill (Republican) 47.43%; ▌Charles Farrell (Prohibition) 3.16%
Illinois 9	Lewis E. Payson	Republican	1880	Incumbent lost re-election. Democratic gain.	▌ ✓ Herman W. Snow (Democratic) 50.25%; ▌Lewis E. Payson (Republican) 47.17%; ▌Oliver W. Stewart (Prohibition) 2.58%
Illinois 10	Philip S. Post	Republican	1886	Incumbent re-elected.	▌ ✓ Philip S. Post (Republican) 50.07%; ▌George A. Wilson (Democratic) 48.16%; ▌Marvin S. Carr (Prohibition) 1.44%; ▌Joseph S. Barnum (Farmers' Alliance) 0.33%
Illinois 11	William H. Gest	Republican	1886	Incumbent lost re-election. Democratic gain.	▌ ✓ Benjamin T. Cable (Democratic) 51.23%; ▌William H. Gest (Republican) 46.27%; ▌S.T. Sheldon (Prohibition) 2.46%; ▌Write-In 0.03%
Illinois 12	Scott Wike	Democratic	1888	Incumbent re-elected.	▌ ✓ Scott Wike (Democratic) 58.10%; ▌Milton McClure (Republican) 37.24%; ▌John W. Bush (Prohibition) 2.58%; ▌Thomas Barton (Farmers' Alliance) 2.09%
Illinois 13	William McKendree Springer	Democratic	1874	Incumbent re-elected.	▌ ✓ William McKendree Springer (Democratic) 54.34%; ▌Jesse Hanon (Republican) 41.36%; ▌Robert H. Patton (Prohibition) 4.30%
Illinois 14	Jonathan H. Rowell	Republican	1882	Incumbent lost re-election. Democratic gain.	▌ ✓ Owen Scott (Democratic) 49.54%; ▌Jonathan H. Rowell (Republican) 45.91%; ▌William C. Outten (Prohibition) 4.56%
Illinois 15	Joseph Gurney Cannon	Republican	1872	Incumbent lost re-election. Democratic gain.	▌ ✓ Samuel T. Busey (Democratic) 49.70%; ▌Joseph Gurney Cannon (Republican) 48.18%; ▌John S. Sargeant (Prohibition) 1.71%; ▌Jesse Harper (Farmers' Alliance) 0.42%
Illinois 16	George W. Fithian	Democratic	1888	Incumbent re-elected.	▌ ✓ George W. Fithian (Democratic) 50.25%; ▌John D. Reeder (Republican) 48.68%; ▌William H. Hughes (Prohibition) 1.07%
Illinois 17	Edward Lane	Democratic	1886	Incumbent re-elected.	▌ ✓ Edward Lane (Democratic) 51.70%; ▌Fletcher Chapman (Republican) 30.22%; ▌Edward Roessler (Farmers' Alliance) 15.00%; ▌Jasper L. Douthit (Prohibition) 3.09%
Illinois 18	William S. Forman	Democratic	1888	Incumbent re-elected.	▌ ✓ William S. Forman (Democratic) 51.74%; ▌Cicero J. Lindley (Republican) 46.18%; ▌James P. Courtney (Prohibition) 2.08%
Illinois 19	James R. Williams	Democratic	1889 (special)	Incumbent re-elected.	▌ ✓ James R. Williams (Democratic) 56.43%; ▌George W. Pillow (Republican) 40.88%; ▌John H. Wilson (Prohibition) 2.69%
Illinois 20	George Washington Smith	Republican	1888	Incumbent re-elected.	▌ ✓ George Washington Smith (Republican) 49.55%; ▌William S. Morris (Democratic) 45.86%; ▌L. L. Lawrence (Farmers' Alliance) 2.66%; ▌Edward A. Davis (Prohibition) 1.93%

== Indiana ==
District	Incumbent			This race	
District	Member	Party	First elected	Results	Candidates
Indiana 1	William F. Parrett	Democratic	1888	Incumbent re-elected.	▌ ✓ William F. Parrett (Democratic) 50.35%; ▌James S. Wright (Republican) 48.02%; ▌William M. Land (Prohibition) 1.62%
Indiana 2	John H. O'Neall	Democratic	1886	Incumbent retired. Democratic hold.	▌ ✓ John L. Bretz (Democratic) 46.35%; ▌William N. Darnell (Republican) 37.83%; ▌Sampson Cox (Populist) 14.66%; ▌Anderson F. Fox (Prohibition) 1.16%
Indiana 3	Jason B. Brown	Democratic	1888	Incumbent re-elected.	▌ ✓ Jason B. Brown (Democratic) 56.22%; ▌William J. Durham (Republican) 42.69%; ▌Moses Poindexter (Prohibition) 1.10%
Indiana 4	William S. Holman	Democratic	1880	Incumbent re-elected.	▌ ✓ William S. Holman (Democratic) 52.28%; ▌John T. Rankin (Republican) 46.53%; ▌Samuel V. Wright (Prohibition) 1.19%
Indiana 5	George W. Cooper	Democratic	1888	Incumbent re-elected.	▌ ✓ George W. Cooper (Democratic) 51.50%; ▌John G. Dunbar (Republican) 46.36%; ▌William R. Sheit (Prohibition) 2.15%
Indiana 6	Thomas M. Browne	Republican	1876	Incumbent retired. Republican hold.	▌ ✓ Henry U. Johnson (Republican) 56.90%; ▌David S. Trowbridge (Democratic) 39.53%; ▌William Edgerton (Prohibition) 3.57%
Indiana 7	William D. Bynum	Democratic	1884	Incumbent re-elected.	▌ ✓ William D. Bynum (Democratic) 54.19%; ▌John J.W. Billingsley (Republican) 43.68%; ▌Charles W. Culbertson (Prohibition) 2.12%
Indiana 8	Elijah V. Brookshire	Democratic	1888	Incumbent re-elected.	▌ ✓ Elijah V. Brookshire (Democratic) 52.76%; ▌James A. Mount (Republican) 45.22%; ▌J.C. Ashley (Prohibition) 1.59%; ▌Oliver M. Curry (Populist) 0.43%
Indiana 9	Joseph B. Cheadle	Republican	1886	Incumbent lost renomination. Republican hold.	▌ ✓ Daniel W. Waugh (Republican) 50.17%; ▌Leroy Templeton (Democratic) 47.13%; ▌Milton Hanson (Prohibition) 2.71%
Indiana 10	William D. Owen	Republican	1884	Incumbent lost re-election. Democratic gain.	▌ ✓ David Henry Patton (Democratic) 50.26%; ▌William D. Owen (Republican) 46.87%; ▌Henry I. Adams (Prohibition) 2.78%; ▌John B. Mulroy (Populist) 0.09%
Indiana 11	Augustus N. Martin	Democratic	1888	Incumbent re-elected.	▌ ✓ Augustus N. Martin (Democratic) 51.47%; ▌Cyrus E. Bryant (Republican) 44.51%; ▌Benjamin F. Dickey (Prohibition) 4.02%
Indiana 12	Charles A. O. McClellan	Democratic	1888	Incumbent re-elected.	▌ ✓ Charles A. O. McClellan (Democratic) 54.74%; ▌Jaques N. Babcock (Republican) 42.40%; ▌George H. Hubbard (Prohibition) 2.86%
Indiana 13	Benjamin F. Shively	Democratic	1886	Incumbent re-elected.	▌ ✓ Benjamin F. Shively (Democratic) 52.17%; ▌Henry B. Wilson (Republican) 45.23%; ▌Robert H. Clark (Prohibition) 2.17%; ▌John Y. Maughemar (Populist) 0.43%

== Iowa ==
District	Incumbent			This race	
District	Member	Party	First elected	Results	Candidates
Iowa 1	John H. Gear	Republican	1886	Incumbent lost re-election. Democratic gain.	▌ ✓ John J. Seerley (Democratic) 51.36%; ▌John H. Gear (Republican) 48.20%; ▌Isaac T. Gibson (Prohibition) 0.44%
Iowa 2	Walter I. Hayes	Democratic	1886	Incumbent re-elected.	▌ ✓ Walter I. Hayes (Democratic) 63.82%; ▌Bruce T. Seaman (Republican) 36.11%; ▌T.L. Taggart (Prohibition) 0.07%
Iowa 3	David B. Henderson	Republican	1882	Incumbent re-elected.	▌ ✓ David B. Henderson (Republican) 50.24%; ▌C.F. Couch (Democratic) 49.74%; ▌John Bowman (Prohibition) 0.03%
Iowa 4	Joseph Henry Sweney	Republican	1888	Incumbent lost re-election. Democratic gain.	▌ ✓ Walter H. Butler (Democratic) 52.71%; ▌Joseph Henry Sweney (Republican) 46.99%; ▌H. Parker (Prohibition) 0.30%
Iowa 5	Daniel Kerr	Republican	1886	Incumbent retired. Democratic gain.	▌ ✓ John Taylor Hamilton (Democratic) 50.06%; ▌George R. Struble (Republican) 49.25%; ▌Enoch Lewis (Prohibition) 0.69%
Iowa 6	John F. Lacey	Republican	1888	Incumbent lost re-election. Democratic gain.	▌ ✓ Frederick Edward White (Democratic) 48.96%; ▌John F. Lacey (Republican) 47.47%; ▌Perry Engel (Labor) 3.00%; ▌Liston W. McMillan (Prohibition) 0.58%
Iowa 7	Edward R. Hays	Republican	1890 (special)	Incumbent retired. Republican hold.	▌ ✓ John A. T. Hull (Republican) 53.92%; ▌H.C. Hargis (Democratic) 45.77%; ▌J.G. Little (Prohibition) 0.31%
Iowa 8	James P. Flick	Republican	1888	Incumbent re-elected.	▌ ✓ James P. Flick (Republican) 49.64%; ▌Albert R. Anderson (Ind. Republican) 49.34%; ▌S.A. Gilley (Prohibition) 0.87%; ▌J.N. Harris (Labor) 0.16%
Iowa 9	Joseph Rea Reed	Republican	1888	Incumbent lost re-election. Democratic gain.	▌ ✓ Thomas Bowman (Democratic) 49.98%; ▌Joseph Rea Reed (Republican) 46.53%; ▌Noah H. Bowman (Labor) 3.34%; ▌John Christy (Prohibition) 0.15%
Iowa 10	Jonathan P. Dolliver	Republican	1888	Incumbent re-elected.	▌ ✓ Jonathan P. Dolliver (Republican) 51.69%; ▌I.L. Woode (Democratic) 48.01%; ▌Willis Weaver (Prohibition) 0.25%; ▌J.J. Russell (Populist) 0.06%
Iowa 11	Isaac S. Struble	Republican	1882	Incumbent lost renomination. Republican hold.	▌ ✓ George D. Perkins (Republican) 44.60%; ▌John Pallison (Democratic) 42.07%; ▌A.J. Westfall (Populist) 13.01%; ▌V.G. Farnham (Prohibition) 0.33%

== Kansas ==
District	Incumbent			This race	
District	Member	Party	First elected	Results	Candidates
Kansas 1	Edmund N. Morrill	Republican	1882	Incumbent retired. Republican hold.	▌ ✓ Case Broderick (Republican) 41.69%; ▌Thomas Moonlight (Democratic) 37.76%; ▌L.C. Clark (Populist) 20.45%; ▌J.H. Woodhull (Prohibition) 0.11%
Kansas 2	Edward H. Funston	Republican	1884 (special)	Incumbent re-elected.	▌ ✓ Edward H. Funston (Republican) 43.93%; ▌A.F. Allen (Populist) 30.44%; ▌J.B. Chapman (Democratic) 25.12%; ▌M.F. King (Prohibition) 0.51%
Kansas 3	Bishop W. Perkins	Republican	1882	Incumbent lost re-election. Populist gain.	▌ ✓ Benjamin H. Clover (Populist) 55.21%; ▌Bishop W. Perkins (Republican) 44.79%
Kansas 4	Harrison Kelley	Republican	1889 (special)	Incumbent lost re-election. Populist gain.	▌ ✓ John G. Otis (Populist) 55.56%; ▌Harrison Kelley (Republican) 44.44%
Kansas 5	John Alexander Anderson	Republican	1878	Incumbent retired. Populist gain.	▌ ✓ John Davis (Populist) 52.92%; ▌William A. Phillips (Republican) 38.02%; ▌Park S. Warren (Democratic) 9.06%
Kansas 6	Erastus J. Turner	Republican	1886	Incumbent did not seek re-election. Populist gain.	▌ ✓ William Baker (Populist) 62.60%; ▌Webb McNall (Republican) 36.52%; ▌Tully Scott (Democratic) 0.88%
Kansas 7	Samuel R. Peters	Republican	1882	Incumbent did not seek re-election. Populist gain.	▌ ✓ Jerry Simpson (Populist) 56.42%; ▌James Reed Hallowell (Republican) 43.58%

== Kentucky ==
District	Incumbent			This race	
District	Member	Party	First elected	Results	Candidates
Kentucky 1	William Johnson Stone	Democratic	1884	Incumbent re-elected.	▌ ✓ William Johnson Stone (Democratic) 66.88%; ▌E.F. Frank (Republican) 25.68%; ▌William Curd (Prohibition) 7.45%
Kentucky 2	William T. Ellis	Democratic	1888	Incumbent re-elected.	▌ ✓ William T. Ellis (Democratic) 56.90%; ▌H.R. Bourland (Republican) 43.10%
Kentucky 3	Isaac Goodnight	Democratic	1888	Incumbent re-elected.	▌ ✓ Isaac Goodnight (Democratic) 61.07%; ▌Addison James (Republican) 38.93%
Kentucky 4	Alexander B. Montgomery	Democratic	1886	Incumbent re-elected.	▌ ✓ Alexander B. Montgomery (Democratic) 61.22%; ▌G.W. Long (Republican) 38.78%
Kentucky 5	Asher G. Caruth	Democratic	1886	Incumbent re-elected.	▌ ✓ Asher G. Caruth (Democratic) 60.77%; ▌St. John Boyle (Republican) 39.23%
Kentucky 6	William W. Dickerson	Democratic	1890 (special)	Incumbent re-elected.	▌ ✓ William W. Dickerson (Democratic) 62.25%; ▌Weden O'Neal (Republican) 37.43%; ▌J.W. Vallandingham (Prohibition) 0.31%
Kentucky 7	W. C. P. Breckinridge	Democratic	1884	Incumbent re-elected.	▌ ✓ W. C. P. Breckinridge (Democratic) 92.88%; ▌Hiram Ford (Prohibition) 5.75%; ▌Write-in 1.38%
Kentucky 8	James B. McCreary	Democratic	1884	Incumbent re-elected.	▌ ✓ James B. McCreary (Democratic) 94.96%; ▌J.C. Gilliam (Prohibition) 5.04%
Kentucky 9	Thomas H. Paynter	Democratic	1888	Incumbent re-elected.	▌ ✓ Thomas H. Paynter (Democratic) 60.02%; ▌Alexander Bruce (Republican) 39.50%; ▌W.W. Dye (Prohibition) 0.48%
Kentucky 10	None (New district)			New district. Democratic gain.	▌ ✓ John W. Kendall (Democratic) 53.78%; ▌R.C. Hill (Republican) 46.13%; ▌George W. McCormick 0.10%
Kentucky 11	John H. Wilson; Redistricted from the 10th district	Republican	1888	Incumbent re-elected.	▌ ✓ John H. Wilson (Republican) 60.50%; ▌E.J. Howard (Democratic) 37.54%; ▌D.T. Chestnut (Prohibition) 1.96%
Kentucky 11	Hugh F. Finley	Republican	1886	Incumbent lost renomination Republican loss.	▌ ✓ John H. Wilson (Republican) 60.50%; ▌E.J. Howard (Democratic) 37.54%; ▌D.T. Chestnut (Prohibition) 1.96%

== Louisiana ==
District	Incumbent			This race	
District	Member	Party	First elected	Results	Candidates
Louisiana 1	Theodore S. Wilkinson	Democratic	1886	Incumbent retired. Democratic hold.	▌ ✓ Adolph Meyer (Democratic) 63.24%; ▌Henry C. Warmoth (Republican) 35.96%; ▌Carson Mudge (Union Labor) 0.80%
Louisiana 2	Hamilton D. Coleman	Republican	1888	Incumbent lost re-election. Democratic gain.	▌ ✓ Matthew D. Lagan (Democratic) 61.57%; ▌Hamilton D. Coleman (Republican) 36.06%; ▌Paul Granzin (Union Labor) 2.37%
Louisiana 3	Andrew Price	Democratic	1889 (special)	Incumbent re-elected.	▌ ✓ Andrew Price (Democratic) 99.58%; ▌Taylor Beattie (Republican) 0.42%
Louisiana 4	Newton C. Blanchard	Democratic	1880	Incumbent re-elected.	▌ ✓ Newton C. Blanchard (Democratic) 96.25%; ▌L.J. Guice (Farmers' Alliance) 3.21%; ▌Write-In 0.55%
Louisiana 5	Charles J. Boatner	Democratic	1888	Incumbent re-elected.	▌ ✓ Charles J. Boatner (Democratic) 92.65%; ▌L.C. Pritchard (Farmers' Alliance) 5.32%; ▌Smith W. Green (Republican) 2.03%
Louisiana 6	Samuel M. Robertson	Democratic	1887 (special)	Incumbent re-elected.	▌ ✓ Samuel M. Robertson (Democratic) 100.00%

== Maine ==
District	Incumbent			This race	
District	Member	Party	First elected	Results	Candidates
Maine 1	Thomas B. Reed	Republican	1876	Incumbent re-elected.	▌ ✓ Thomas B. Reed (Republican) 57.18%; ▌Melvin P. Frank (Democratic) 40.75%; ▌Timothy B. Hussey (Prohibition) 1.90%
Maine 2	Nelson Dingley Jr.	Republican	1881 (special)	Incumbent re-elected.	▌ ✓ Nelson Dingley Jr. (Republican) 58.03%; ▌Charles E. Allen (Democratic) 39.35%; ▌William H. Foster (Prohibition) 2.62%
Maine 3	Seth L. Milliken	Republican	1882	Incumbent re-elected.	▌ ✓ Seth L. Milliken (Republican) 54.67%; ▌Charles Baker (Democratic) 41.58%; ▌Luther C. Bateman (Union Labor) 3.76%
Maine 4	Charles A. Boutelle	Republican	1882	Incumbent re-elected.	▌ ✓ Charles A. Boutelle (Republican) 56.49%; ▌Josiah Crosby (Democratic) 40.06%; ▌Volney B. Cushing (Prohibition) 3.46%

== Maryland ==
District	Incumbent			This race	
District	Member	Party	First elected	Results	Candidates
Maryland 1	Charles H. Gibson	Democratic	1884	Incumbent retired. Democratic hold.	▌ ✓ Henry Page (Democratic) 52.36%; ▌George M. Russum (Republican) 43.95%; ▌George W. Covington (Prohibition) 3.69%
Maryland 2	Herman Stump	Democratic	1888	Incumbent re-elected.	▌ ✓ Herman Stump (Democratic) 57.05%; ▌John E. Wilson (Republican) 39.01%; ▌George Baldentow (Prohibition) 3.94%
Maryland 3	Harry W. Rusk	Democratic	1886 (special)	Incumbent re-elected.	▌ ✓ Harry W. Rusk (Democratic) 59.08%; ▌Royal H. Pullman (Republican) 39.37%; ▌William J. Gluck (Prohibition) 1.55%
Maryland 4	Henry Stockbridge Jr.	Republican	1888	Incumbent did not seek re-election. Democratic gain.	▌ ✓ Isidor Rayner (Democratic) 59.72%; ▌Henry H. Goldsborough (Republican) 38.58%; ▌Palmer L. Parkins (Prohibition) 1.70%
Maryland 5	Sydney E. Mudd I	Republican	1888 (contested)	Incumbent lost re-election. Democratic gain.	▌ ✓ Barnes Compton (Democratic) 52.81%; ▌Sydney E. Mudd I (Republican) 47.00%; ▌John Patrick (Prohibition) 0.19%
Maryland 6	Louis E. McComas	Republican	1882	Incumbent lost re-election. Democratic gain.	▌ ✓ William M. McKaig (Democratic) 49.25%; ▌Louis E. McComas (Republican) 48.77%; ▌Hosea B. Moulton (Prohibition) 1.98%

== Massachusetts ==
District	Incumbent			This race	
District	Member	Party	First elected	Results	Candidates
Massachusetts 1	Charles S. Randall	Republican	1888	Incumbent re-elected.	▌ ✓ Charles S. Randall (Republican) 53.76%; ▌Charles R. Codman (Democratic) 40.17%; ▌John D. Flint (Prohibition) 6.06%
Massachusetts 2	Elijah A. Morse	Republican	1888	Incumbent re-elected.	▌ ✓ Elijah A. Morse (Republican) 52.26%; ▌Bushrod Morse (Democratic) 44.43%; ▌Thomas J. Lathrop (Prohibition) 3.31%
Massachusetts 3	John F. Andrew	Democratic	1888	Incumbent re-elected.	▌ ✓ John F. Andrew (Democratic) 56.15%; ▌Edward L. Pierce (Republican) 41.89%; ▌John W. Field (Prohibition) 1.96%
Massachusetts 4	Joseph H. O'Neil	Democratic	1888	Incumbent re-elected	▌ ✓ Joseph H. O'Neil (Democratic) 72.47%; ▌Thomas Copeland (Republican) 25.66%; ▌George L. Dacy (Prohibition) 1.87%
Massachusetts 5	Nathaniel P. Banks	Republican	1888	Incumbent was not re-nominated. Democratic gain.	▌ ✓ Sherman Hoar (Democratic) 53.00%; ▌James A. Fox (Republican) 43.79%; ▌James H. Roberts (Prohibition) 3.21%
Massachusetts 6	Henry Cabot Lodge	Republican	1886	Incumbent re-elected.	▌ ✓ Henry Cabot Lodge (Republican) 50.01%; ▌William Everett (Democratic) 46.44%; ▌Charles E. Kimball (Prohibition) 3.55%
Massachusetts 7	William Cogswell	Republican	1886	Incumbent re-elected.	▌ ✓ William Cogswell (Republican) 51.52%; ▌Jonas H. French (Democratic) 44.98%; ▌Jacob F. Spalding (Prohibition) 3.50%
Massachusetts 8	Frederic T. Greenhalge	Republican	1888	Incumbent lost re-election. Democratic gain.	▌ ✓ Moses T. Stevens (Democratic) 49.86%; ▌Frederic T. Greenhalge (Republican) 47.93%; ▌Nathaniel A. Glidden (Prohibition) 2.20%
Massachusetts 9	John W. Candler	Republican	1888	Incumbent lost re-election. Democratic gain.	▌ ✓ George F. Williams (Democratic) 48.47%; ▌John W. Candler (Republican) 47.95%; ▌Melvin H. Walker (Prohibition) 3.57%
Massachusetts 10	Joseph H. Walker	Republican	1888	Incumbent re-elected.	▌ ✓ Joseph H. Walker (Republican) 49.44%; ▌Charles B. Pratt (Democratic) 46.33%; ▌Herbert M. Small (Prohibition) 4.23%
Massachusetts 11	Rodney Wallace	Republican	1888	Incumbent retired. Democratic gain.	▌ ✓ Frederick S. Coolidge (Democratic) 40.00%; ▌Timothy G. Spaulding (Republican) 39.36%; ▌Myron P. Walker (Ind. Republican) 15.22%; ▌Henry C. Smith (Prohibition) 5.42%
Massachusetts 12	Francis W. Rockwell	Republican	1884	Incumbent lost re-election. Democratic gain.	▌ ✓ John C. Crosby (Democratic) 49.02%; ▌Francis W. Rockwell (Republican) 47.48%; ▌John Bascom (Prohibition) 3.50%

== Michigan ==
District	Incumbent			This race	
District	Member	Party	First elected	Results	Candidates
Michigan 1	J. Logan Chipman	Democratic	1886	Incumbent re-elected.	▌ ✓ J. Logan Chipman (Democratic) 56.5%; ▌ Hibbard Baker (Republican) 41.1%; ▌ Caleb S. Pitkin (Prohibition) 2.3%; ▌ W. E.Thornton (Industrial) 0.1%
Michigan 2	Edward P. Allen	Republican	1886	Incumbent lost re-election. Democratic gain.	▌ ✓ James S. Gorman (Democratic) 49.1%; ▌ Edward P. Allen (Republican) 43.4%; ▌ Thomas F. Moore (Prohibition) 7.5%
Michigan 3	James O'Donnell	Republican	1884	Incumbent re-elected.	▌ ✓ James O'Donnell (Republican) 44.5%; ▌ John W. Fletcher (Democratic) 37.9%; ▌ Robert Fraser (Prohibition) 9.1%; ▌ Samuel Dickie (Industrial) 8.5%
Michigan 4	Julius C. Burrows	Republican	1884	Incumbent re-elected.	▌ ✓ Julius C. Burrows (Republican) 45.3%; ▌ George L. Yaple (Democratic) 44.1%; ▌ George F. Cunningham (Prohibition) 8.0%
Michigan 5	Charles E. Belknap	Republican	1888	Incumbent retired. Democratic gain.	▌ ✓ Melbourne H. Ford (Democratic) 49.6%; ▌ Charles W. Watkins (Republican) 44.5%; ▌ Edward L. Briggs (Prohibition) 5.7%
Michigan 6	Mark S. Brewer	Republican	1886	Incumbent retired. Democratic gain.	▌ ✓ Byron G. Stout (Democratic) 44.5%; ▌ William Bal (Republican) 42.7%; ▌ Jay Sessions (Prohibition) 7.8%; ▌ George W. Caswell (Industrial) 5.0%
Michigan 7	Justin R. Whiting	Democratic	1886	Incumbent re-elected.	▌ ✓ Justin R. Whiting (Democratic) 50.7%; ▌ James S. Ayres (Republican) 43.8%; ▌ John Russell (Prohibition) 4.5%; ▌ A. Paget (Industrial) 1.0%
Michigan 8	Aaron T. Bliss	Republican	1888	Incumbent lost re-election. Democratic gain.	▌ ✓ Henry M. Youmans (Democratic) 47.2%; ▌ Aaron T. Bliss (Republican) 47.0%; ▌ William M. Smith (Prohibition) 5.8%
Michigan 9	Byron M. Cutcheon	Republican	1882	Incumbent lost re-election. Democratic gain.	▌ ✓ Harrison H. Wheeler (Democratic) 45.7%; ▌ Byron M. Cutcheon (Republican) 45.6%; ▌ Oscar M. Brownson (Prohibition) 8.0%
Michigan 10	Frank W. Wheeler	Republican	1888	Incumbent retired. Democratic gain.	▌ ✓ Thomas A. E. Weadock (Democratic) 50.6%; ▌ Watts S. Humphrey (Republican) 45.6%; ▌ Silas A. Lane (Prohibition) 2.9%; ▌ Charles S. Kilmer (Industrial) 0.9%
Michigan 11	Samuel M. Stephenson	Republican	1888	Incumbent re-elected.	▌ ✓ Samuel M. Stephenson (Republican) 50.4%; ▌ John Semer (Democratic) 44.0%; ▌ William H. Simmons (Prohibition) 5.3%

== Minnesota ==
District	Incumbent			This race	
District	Member	Party	First elected	Results	Candidates
Minnesota 1	Mark H. Dunnell	Republican	1888	Incumbent lost re-election. Democratic gain.	▌ ✓ William H. Harries (Democratic/FA) 53.6%; ▌Mark H. Dunnell (Republican) 46.4%
Minnesota 2	John Lind	Republican	1886	Incumbent re-elected.	▌ ✓ John Lind (Republican) 49.2%; ▌James H. Baker (Democratic/FA) 48.0%; ▌Ira B. Reynolds (Prohibition) 2.7%
Minnesota 3	Darwin Hall	Republican	1888	Incumbent lost re-election. Democratic gain.	▌ ✓ Osee M. Hall (Democratic) 50.5%; ▌Darwin Hall (Republican) 37.5%; ▌William W. Gamble (Farmers' Alliance) 8.8%; ▌Charles R. Sheppard (Prohibition) 3.2%
Minnesota 4	Samuel Snider	Republican	1888	Incumbent lost re-election. Democratic gain.	▌ ✓ James Castle (Democratic) 51.8%; ▌Samuel Snider (Republican) 43.5%; ▌William J. Dean (Prohibition) 4.7%
Minnesota 5	Solomon Comstock	Republican	1888	Incumbent lost re-election. Populist gain.	▌ ✓ Kittel Halvorson (Populist/Proh./FA) 37.7%; ▌Solomon Comstock (Republican) 33.9%; ▌Alonzo Whiteman (Democratic) 28.4%

== Mississippi ==
District	Incumbent			This race	
District	Member	Party	First elected	Results	Candidates
Mississippi 1	John M. Allen	Democratic	1884	Incumbent re-elected.	▌ ✓ John M. Allen (Democratic) 100%
Mississippi 2	James B. Morgan	Democratic	1884	Incumbent retired. Democratic hold.	▌ ✓ John C. Kyle (Democratic) 67.07%; ▌George M. Buchanan (Republican) 32.93%
Mississippi 3	Thomas C. Catchings	Democratic	1884	Incumbent re-elected.	▌ ✓ Thomas C. Catchings (Democratic) 75.85%; ▌James Hill (Republican) 24.15%
Mississippi 4	Clarke Lewis	Democratic	1888	Incumbent re-elected.	▌ ✓ Clarke Lewis (Democratic) 80.52%; ▌W. D. Frazee (Republican) 19.48%
Mississippi 5	Chapman L. Anderson	Democratic	1886	Incumbent lost renomination. Democratic hold.	▌ ✓ Joseph H. Beeman (Democratic) 100%
Mississippi 6	T. R. Stockdale	Democratic	1886	Incumbent re-elected.	▌ ✓ T. R. Stockdale (Democratic) 71.25%; ▌H. C. Griffin (Republican) 28.75%
Mississippi 7	Charles E. Hooker	Democratic	1886	Incumbent re-elected.	▌ ✓ Charles E. Hooker (Democratic) 75.60%; ▌J. M. Matthews (Republican) 24.40%

== Missouri ==
District	Incumbent			This race	
District	Member	Party	First elected	Results	Candidates
Missouri 1	William H. Hatch	Democratic	1878	Incumbent re-elected.	▌ ✓ William H. Hatch (Democratic) 56.7%; ▌ Francis M. Harrington (Republican) 42.3%; ▌ John M. London (Union Labor) 1.0%
Missouri 2	Charles H. Mansur	Democratic	1886	Incumbent re-elected.	▌ ✓ Charles H. Mansur (Democratic) 57.2%; ▌ James Pettyjohn (Republican) 36.7%; ▌ J. W. Donovan (Union Labor) 6.1%
Missouri 3	Alexander M. Dockery	Democratic	1882	Incumbent re-elected.	▌ ✓ Alexander M. Dockery (Democratic) 55.0%; ▌ Patrick S. Kenney (Republican) 35.1%; ▌ James H. Hillis (Union Labor) 9.8%
Missouri 4	Robert P. C. Wilson	Democratic	1889	Incumbent re-elected.	▌ ✓ Robert P. C. Wilson (Democratic) 51.4%; ▌ Nicholas Ford (Republican) 40.6%; ▌ John D. Whipple (Union Labor) 7.2%; ▌ B. O. Cowan (Prohibition) 0.8%
Missouri 5	John C. Tarsney	Democratic	1888	Incumbent re-elected.	▌ ✓ John C. Tarsney (Democratic) 57.7%; ▌ D. S. Twitchell (Republican) 40.2%; ▌ G. H. Heffner (Independent) 2.1%
Missouri 6	John T. Heard	Democratic	1884	Incumbent re-elected.	▌ ✓ John T. Heard (Democratic) 54.6%; ▌ Edward L. Redman (Republican) 37.2%; ▌ William C. Aldridge (Union Labor) 8.2%
Missouri 7	Richard H. Norton	Democratic	1888	Incumbent re-elected.	▌ ✓ Richard H. Norton (Democratic) 58.1%; ▌ W. D. Barnett (Republican) 41.9%
Missouri 8	Frederick G. Niedringhaus	Republican	1888	Incumbent retired. Democratic gain.	▌ ✓ John J. O'Neill (Democratic) 54.9%; ▌ Charles F. Joy (Republican) 45.1%
Missouri 9	Nathan Frank	Republican	1888	Incumbent retired. Democratic gain.	▌ ✓ Seth W. Cobb (Democratic) 58.8%; ▌ Thomas J. Prosser (Republican) 38.7%; ▌ John T. Field (Prohibition) 1.8%; ▌ George L. Bauer (Union Labor) 0.7%
Missouri 10	William M. Kinsey	Republican	1888	Incumbent lost re-election. Democratic gain.	▌ ✓ Samuel Byrns (Democratic) 52.5%; ▌ William M. Kinsey (Republican) 47.3%; ▌ Isaac M. Baker (Prohibition) 0.2%
Missouri 11	Richard P. Bland	Democratic	1872	Incumbent re-elected.	▌ ✓ Richard P. Bland (Democratic) 56.1%; ▌ John L. Erwin (Republican) 43.9%
Missouri 12	William J. Stone	Democratic	1884	Incumbent retired. Democratic hold.	▌ ✓ David A. De Armond (Democratic) 48.2%; ▌ W. B. Lewis (Republican) 32.3%; ▌ G. M. Wykoff (Union Labor) 19.1%; ▌ Van B. Wisker (Prohibition) 0.4%
Missouri 13	William H. Wade	Republican	1884	Incumbent lost re-election. Democratic gain.	▌ ✓ Robert W. Fyan (Democratic) 49.9%; ▌ William H. Wade (Republican) 41.6%; ▌ Warren Vertrees (Union Labor) 8.5%
Missouri 14	Robert H. Whitelaw	Democratic	1890	Incumbent retired. Democratic hold.	▌ ✓ Marshall Arnold (Democratic) 59.7%; ▌ J. W. Rogers (Republican) 40.3%

== Montana ==
District	Incumbent			This race	
District	Member	Party	First elected	Results	Candidates
Montana at-large	Thomas H. Carter	Republican	1889	Incumbent lost re-election. Democratic gain.	▌ ✓ William W. Dixon (Democratic) 49.57%; ▌Thomas H. Carter (Republican) 48.66%; ▌W. T. Field (Labor) 1.25%; ▌Andrew L. Corbly (Prohibition) 0.52%

== Nebraska ==
Nebraska's results

District	Incumbent			This race	
District	Member	Party	First elected	Results	Candidates
Nebraska 1	William J. Connell	Republican	1888	Incumbent lost re-election. Democratic gain.	▌ ✓ William Jennings Bryan (Democratic) 44.49%; ▌William J. Connell (Republican) 35.26%; ▌Allen Root (Populist) 17.95%; ▌E. H. Chapin (Prohibition) 2.30%
Nebraska 2	Gilbert L. Laws	Republican	1889 (special)	Incumbent retired. Populist gain.	▌ ✓ William A. McKeighan (Populist) 61.09%; ▌N. V. Harlan (Republican) 36.85%; ▌L. B. Palmer (Prohibition) 2.06%
Nebraska 3	George W. E. Dorsey	Republican	1884	Incumbent lost re-election. Populist gain.	▌ ✓ Omer M. Kem (Populist) 39.98%; ▌George W. E. Dorsey (Republican) 31.95%; ▌William H. Thompson (Democratic) 28.07%

== Nevada ==
District	Incumbent			This race	
District	Member	Party	First elected	Results	Candidates
Nevada at-large	Horace F. Bartine	Republican	1888	Incumbent re-elected.	▌ ✓ Horace F. Bartine (Republican) 53.4%; ▌ George W. Cassidy (Democratic) 46.3%; ▌ [FNU] Ward (Prohibition) 0.3%

== New Hampshire ==
District	Incumbent			This race	
District	Member	Party	First elected	Results	Candidates
New Hampshire 1	Alonzo Nute	Republican	1888	Incumbent retired to run for Governor of New Hampshire. Democratic gain.	▌ ✓ Luther F. McKinney (Democratic) 50.7%; ▌ David A. Taggart (Republican) 48.0%; ▌ Frank K. Chase (Prohibition) 1.2%
New Hampshire 2	Orren C. Moore	Republican	1888	Incumbent lost re-election. Democratic gain.	▌ ✓ Warren F. Daniell (Democratic) 49.7%; ▌ Orren C. Moore (Republican) 48.8%; ▌ Charles H. Thorndike (Prohibition) 1.5%

== New Jersey ==
District	Incumbent			This race	
District	Member	Party	First elected	Results	Candidates
New Jersey 1	Christopher A. Bergen	Republican	1888	Incumbent re-elected.	▌ ✓ Christopher A. Bergen (Republican) 50.9%; ▌ William M. Newell (Democratic) 43.7%; ▌ William, H. Nicholson (Prohibition) 5.4%
New Jersey 2	James Buchanan	Republican	1884	Incumbent re-elected.	▌ ✓ James Buchanan (Republican) 50.0%; ▌ Wilson D. Haven (Democratic) 46.6%; ▌ Leonard Brown (Prohibition) 3.4%
New Jersey 3	Jacob Augustus Geissenhainer	Democratic	1888	Incumbent re-elected.	▌ ✓ Jacob Augustus Geissenhainer (Democratic) 54.6%; ▌ Amos Clark Jr. (Republican) 42.4%; ▌ Garner R. Snyder (Prohibition) 3.0%
New Jersey 4	Samuel Fowler	Democratic	1888	Incumbent re-elected.	▌ ✓ Samuel Fowler (Democratic) 56.5%; ▌ Richard F. Goodman (Republican) 36.8%; ▌ John F. Schenck (Prohibition) 6.7%
New Jersey 5	Charles D. Beckwith	Republican	1888	Incumbent lost re-election. Democratic gain.	▌ ✓ Cornelius A. Cadmus (Democratic) 50.4%; ▌ Charles D. Beckwith (Republican) 46.4%; ▌ James S. Bradbrook (Prohibition) 3.2%
New Jersey 6	Herman Lehlbach	Republican	1884	Incumbent retired. Democratic gain.	▌ ✓ Thomas Dunn English (Democratic) 50.9%; ▌ Elias M. Condit (Republican) 46.9%; ▌ John R. Anderson (Prohibition) 2.2%
New Jersey 7	William McAdoo	Democratic	1882	Incumbent lost renomination. Democratic hold.	▌ ✓ Edward F. McDonald (Democratic) 56.0%; ▌ Frank O. Cole (Republican) 42.9%; ▌ Joel M. Brown (Prohibition) 1.1%

== New York ==
District	Incumbent			This race	
District	Member	Party	First elected	Results	Candidates
New York 1	James W. Covert	Democratic	1888	Incumbent re-elected.	▌ ✓ James W. Covert (Democratic) 56.0%; ▌ John Lewis Childs (Republican) 41.5%; ▌ Ellisworth Johnson (Prohibition) 2.5%
New York 2	Felix Campbell	Democratic	1882	Incumbent retired. Democratic hold.	▌ ✓ David A. Boody (Democratic) 57.7%; ▌ James Gresham (Republican) 40.1%; ▌ John N. Jones (Prohibition) 1.3%; ▌ Francis A. Koenig (Socialist Labor) 0.9%
New York 3	William C. Wallace	Republican	1888	Incumbent lost re-election. Democratic gain.	▌ ✓ William J. Coombs (Democratic) 48.9%; ▌ William C. Wallace (Republican) 48.8%; ▌ Freeborn Garretson (Prohibition) 1.2%; ▌ Matthew Loven (Socialist Labor) 1.1%
New York 4	John Michael Clancy	Democratic	1888	Incumbent re-elected.	▌ ✓ John Michael Clancy (Democratic) 67.6%; ▌ Andrew J. Perry (Republican) 31.4%; ▌ Andrew L. Martin (Prohibition) 1.0%
New York 5	Thomas F. Magner	Democratic	1888	Incumbent re-elected.	▌ ✓ Thomas F. Magner (Democratic) 58.4%; ▌ John R. Smith (Republican) 38.4%; ▌ Gustav Schaefer (Prohibition) 3.1%
New York 6	Charles Henry Turner	Democratic	1889	Incumbent retired. Democratic hold.	▌ ✓ John R. Fellows (Tammany Hall Democratic) 57.2%; ▌ Cornelius Donovan (Republican) 31.3%; ▌ Edwin L. Abbett (County Democratic) 10.8%; ▌ Nathan W. Cady (Prohibition) 0.7%
New York 7	Edward J. Dunphy	Democratic	1888	Incumbent re-elected.	▌ ✓ Edward J. Dunphy (Tammany Hall Democratic) 60.0%; ▌ William Morgan (Republican) 24.1%; ▌ William T. Croasdale (County Democratic) 15.4%; ▌ William S. Pulver (Prohibition) 0.5%
New York 8	John H. McCarthy	Democratic	1888	Incumbent resigned to become Justice of the City Court of New York City. Democratic hold.	▌ ✓ Timothy J. Campbell (Democratic) 77.9%; ▌ Samuel Rinaldo (Republican) 18.7%; ▌ Alexander Jonas (Socialist Labor) 2.9%; ▌ William E. Brown (Prohibition) 0.5%
New York 9	Amos J. Cummings	Democratic	1889	Incumbent re-elected.	▌ ✓ Amos J. Cummings (Democratic) 71.8%; ▌ John Weiss (Republican) 22.5%; ▌ Christian Ensinger (Socialist Labor) 5.4%; ▌ Irving S. Roney (Prohibition) 0.3%
New York 10	Francis B. Spinola	Democratic	1886	Incumbent re-elected.	▌ ✓ Francis B. Spinola (Democratic) 70.5%; ▌ Cortlandt S. Van Rensselaer (Republican) 26.9%; ▌ Charles Wagner (Socialist Labor) 2.1%; ▌ Alfred H. Hepper (Prohibition) 0.5%
New York 11	John Quinn	Democratic	1888	Incumbent retired. Democratic hold.	▌ ✓ J. De Witt Warner (Democratic) 64.2%; ▌ Charles A. Flammer (Republican) 33.3%; ▌ August Freudig (Socialist Labor) 1.8%; ▌ William H. Draper (Prohibition) 0.7%
New York 12	Roswell P. Flower	Democratic	1888	Incumbent re-elected.	▌ ✓ Roswell P. Flower (Democratic) 69.4%; ▌ Charles H. Blair (Republican) 26.0%; ▌ John J. Flick (Socialist Labor) 4.1%; ▌ John L. Thomas (Prohibition) 0.5%
New York 13	Ashbel P. Fitch	Democratic	1886	Incumbent re-elected.	▌ ✓ Ashbel P. Fitch (Democratic) 68.9%; ▌ Percy D. Adams (Republican) 28.8%; ▌ Eugene H. Eckbert (Socialist Labor) 1.7%; ▌ Howard G. Myers (Prohibition) 0.6%
New York 14	William G. Stahlnecker	Democratic	1884	Incumbent re-elected.	▌ ✓ William G. Stahlnecker (Democratic) 53.4%; ▌ J. Thomas Stearns (Republican) 35.5%; ▌ Alexander Taylor (Independent Republican) 7.4%; ▌ Squire T. Willis (Prohibition) 2.2%; ▌ Frederick B. Bennetts (Socialist Labor) 1.5%
New York 15	Moses D. Stivers	Republican	1888	Incumbent retired. Democratic gain.	▌ ✓ Henry Bacon (Democratic) 50.9%; ▌ Clarence Lexow (Republican) 45.4%; ▌ John A. Helvey (Prohibition) 3.7%
New York 16	John H. Ketcham	Republican	1876	Incumbent re-elected.	▌ ✓ John H. Ketcham (Republican) 75.3%; ▌ William W. Smith (Prohibition) 24.7%
New York 17	Charles J. Knapp	Republican	1888	Incumbent retired. Democratic gain.	▌ ✓ Isaac N. Cox (Democratic) 53.5%; ▌ Theodore C. Teale (Republican) 46.5%
New York 18	John A. Quackenbush	Republican	1888	Incumbent re-elected.	▌ ✓ John A. Quackenbush (Republican) 50.2%; ▌ Michael F. Collins (Democratic) 46.6%; ▌ Jonathan F. Hoag (Prohibition) 3.2%
New York 19	Charles Tracey	Democratic	1887	Incumbent re-elected.	▌ ✓ Charles Tracey (Democratic) 56.9%; ▌ Angus M. Shoemaker (Republican) 40.9%; ▌ Levi Dederick (Prohibition) 2.2%
New York 20	John Sanford	Republican	1888	Incumbent re-elected.	▌ ✓ John Sanford (Republican) 50.4%; ▌ Alexander B. Baucus (Democratic) 46.1%; ▌ James H. Bronson (Prohibition) 3.5%
New York 21	John H. Moffitt	Republican	1886	Incumbent retired. Republican hold.	▌ ✓ John M. Wever (Republican) 55.6%; ▌ Anthony B. Ross (Democratic) 41.0%; ▌ Charles S. Judd (Prohibition) 3.4%
New York 22	Frederick Lansing	Republican	1888	Incumbent retired. Republican hold.	▌ ✓ Leslie W. Russell (Republican) 56.3%; ▌ Smith J. Woolworth (Democratic) 36.9%; ▌ Henry P. Forbes (Prohibition) 6.8%
New York 23	James S. Sherman	Republican	1886	Incumbent lost re-election. Democratic gain.	▌ ✓ Henry Wilbur Bentley (Democratic) 50.4%; ▌ James S. Sherman (Republican) 48.7%; ▌ W. Fletcher Curtis (Prohibition) 0.9%
New York 24	John S. Pindar	Democratic	1890	Incumbent retired. Democratic hold.	▌ ✓ George Van Horn (Democratic) 48.3%; ▌ Frank B. Arnold (Republican) 47.6%; ▌ Andrew A. Mather (Prohibition) 4.1%
New York 25	James J. Belden	Republican	1887	Incumbent re-elected.	▌ ✓ James J. Belden (Republican) 57.1%; ▌ William Stitt (Democratic) 37.8%; ▌ Andrew N. Vanderbilt (Prohibition) 5.1%
New York 26	Milton De Lano	Republican	1886	Incumbent retired. Republican hold.	▌ ✓ George W. Ray (Republican) 51.7%; ▌ Thomas H. Beall (Democratic) 41.9%; ▌ Mott C. Dixon (Prohibition) 6.4%
New York 27	Sereno E. Payne	Republican	1889	Incumbent re-elected.	▌ ✓ Sereno E. Payne (Republican) 50.6%; ▌ Edwin K. Burnham (Democratic) 45.0%; ▌ Charles D. Mills (Prohibition) 4.4%
New York 28	Thomas S. Flood	Republican	1886	Incumbent retired. Democratic gain.	▌ ✓ Hosea H. Rockwell (Democratic) 47.9%; ▌ Henry T. Noyes (Republican) 47.6%; ▌ Isaac C. Andrews (Prohibition) 4.5%
New York 29	John Raines	Republican	1888	Incumbent re-elected.	▌ ✓ John Raines (Republican) 49.7%; ▌ De Merville Page (Democratic) 45.1%; ▌ Daniel J. Chittenden (Prohibition) 5.2%
New York 30	Charles S. Baker	Republican	1884	Incumbent retired. Democratic gain.	▌ ✓ Halbert S. Greenleaf (Democratic) 48.5%; ▌ John Van Voorhis (Republican) 47.7%; ▌ John J. Cornell (Prohibition) 3.8%
New York 31	John G. Sawyer	Republican	1884	Incumbent retired. Republican hold.	▌ ✓ James W. Wadsworth (Republican) 82.2%; ▌ Alva Carpenter (Prohibition) 13.6%; ▌ Michael C. Shea (Socialist Labor) 4.2%
New York 32	John McCreath Farquhar	Republican	1884	Incumbent retired. Democratic gain.	▌ ✓ Daniel N. Lockwood (Democratic) 55.7%; ▌ Benjamin H. Williams (Republican) 42.6%; ▌ Calvin S. Grosser (Prohibition) 1.7%
New York 33	John M. Wiley	Democratic	1888	Incumbent retired. Democratic hold.	▌ ✓ Thomas L. Bunting (Democratic) 51.6%; ▌ George Allen Davis (Republican) 44.2%; ▌ Guy C. Humphrey (Prohibition) 4.2%
New York 34	William G. Laidlaw	Republican	1886	Incumbent retired. Republican hold.	▌ ✓ Warren B. Hooker (Republican) 54.7%; ▌ Hiram Smith (Democratic) 35.0%; ▌ Jesse Rogers (Prohibition) 10.3%

== North Carolina ==
District	Incumbent			This race	
District	Member	Party	First elected	Results	Candidates
North Carolina 1	Thomas G. Skinner	Democratic	1883 (special); 1886 (retired); 1888	Incumbent retired. Democratic hold.	▌ ✓ William A. B. Branch (Democratic) 56.23%; ▌Claude M. Bernard (Republican) 43.39%; ▌Decatur W. Jarvis (Prohibition) 0.38%
North Carolina 2	Henry P. Cheatham	Republican	1888	Incumbent re-elected.	▌ ✓ Henry P. Cheatham (Republican) 51.66%; ▌James M. Mewborne (Democratic) 47.91%
North Carolina 3	Charles W. McClammy	Democratic	1886	Incumbent retired. Democratic hold.	▌ ✓ Benjamin F. Grady (Democratic) 66.98%; ▌George C. Scurlock (Republican) 32.97%
North Carolina 4	Benjamin H. Bunn	Democratic	1888	Incumbent re-elected.	▌ ✓ Benjamin H. Bunn (Democratic) 59.80%; ▌Alexander McIver (Republican) 39.09%; ▌James M. Templeton (Prohibition) 1.09%
North Carolina 5	John M. Brower	Republican	1886	Incumbent lost re-election. Democratic gain.	▌ ✓ A. H. A. Williams (Democratic) 52.55%; ▌John M. Brower (Republican) 46.24%; Others: ▌Charles H. Ireland (Prohibition) 0.64%; ▌Charles H. Moore (Ind. Republican) 0.56%
North Carolina 6	Alfred Rowland	Democratic	1886	Incumbent retired. Democratic hold.	▌ ✓ Sydenham B. Alexander (Democratic) 66.62%; ▌Richard M. Norment (Republican) 33.37%
North Carolina 7	John S. Henderson	Democratic	1884	Incumbent re-elected.	▌ ✓ John S. Henderson (Democratic) 57.41%; ▌Pleasant C. Thomas (Republican) 40.22%; ▌Thomas M. George (Prohibition) 2.34%
North Carolina 8	William H. H. Cowles	Democratic	1884	Incumbent re-elected.	▌ ✓ William H. H. Cowles (Democratic) 53.67%; ▌Edward W. Faucette (Republican) 45.36%; ▌Samuel M. McCall (Independent) 0.94%
North Carolina 9	Hamilton G. Ewart	Republican	1888	Incumbent lost re-election. Democratic gain.	▌ ✓ William T. Crawford (Democratic) 51.83%; ▌Hamilton G. Ewart (Republican) 48.17%

== North Dakota ==
District	Incumbent			This race	
District	Member	Party	First elected	Results	Candidates
North Dakota at-large	Henry C. Hansbrough	Republican	1889	Incumbent lost renomination. Republican hold.	▌ ✓ Martin N. Johnson (Republican) 59.03%; ▌John D. Benton (Democratic) 40.97%

== Ohio ==
The Ohio Legislature redistricted the state between censuses. Coupled with other Democratic gains, this redistricting gave the Democrats a nine-seat net gain.

District	Incumbent			This race	
District	Member	Party	First elected	Results	Candidates
Ohio 1	Benjamin Butterworth	Republican	1884	Incumbent retired. Republican hold.	▌ ✓ Bellamy Storer (Republican) 53.3%; ▌Otway Cosgrove (Democratic) 46.0%; ▌C. P. Bennett (Prohibition) 0.4%
Ohio 2	John A. Caldwell	Republican	1888	Incumbent re-elected.	▌ ✓ John A. Caldwell (Republican) 59.9%; ▌Alexander Long (Democratic) 38.9%; ▌C. B. Bosserman (Prohibition) 0.3%
Ohio 3	Henry Lee Morey; Redistricted from the 7th district	Republican	1888	Incumbent lost re-election. Democratic gain.	▌ ✓ George W. Houk (Democratic) 51.5%; ▌Henry Lee Morey (Republican) 45.1%; ▌W. M. Hollinger (Prohibition) 2.3%; ▌S. H. Ellis (Union Labor) 1.1%
Ohio 4	Elihu S. Williams; Redistricted from the 3rd district	Republican	1886	Incumbent retired. Democratic gain.	▌ ✓ Martin K. Gantz (Democratic) 49.5%; ▌William P. Orr (Republican) 46.2%; ▌Randolph Rock (Prohibition) 3.8%; ▌Isaac Freeman (Union Labor) 0.5%
Ohio 5	Samuel S. Yoder; Redistricted from the 4th district	Democratic	1886	Incumbent retired. Democratic hold.	▌ ✓ Fernando C. Layton (Democratic) 52.7%; ▌Lawrence W. Stroup (Republican) 41.7%; ▌Henry Price (Prohibition) 3.8%; ▌John Smith (Union Labor) 1.8%
Ohio 5	Robert P. Kennedy; Redistricted from the 8th district	Republican	1886	Incumbent retired. Republican loss.	▌ ✓ Fernando C. Layton (Democratic) 52.7%; ▌Lawrence W. Stroup (Republican) 41.7%; ▌Henry Price (Prohibition) 3.8%; ▌John Smith (Union Labor) 1.8%
Ohio 6	Melvin M. Boothman	Republican	1886	Incumbent retired. Democratic gain.	▌ ✓ Dennis D. Donovan (Democratic) 51.0%; ▌Joseph H. Brigham (Republican) 46.3%; ▌W. A. Corkle (Prohibition) 2.7%
Ohio 7	William E. Haynes; Redistricted from the 10th district	Democratic	1888	Incumbent re-elected.	▌ ✓ William E. Haynes (Democratic) 52.4%; ▌James M. Ashley (Republican) 46.4%; ▌A. I. Jones (Prohibition) 1.1%
Ohio 8	George E. Seney; Redistricted from the 5th district	Democratic	1882	Incumbent retired. Democratic hold.	▌ ✓ Darius D. Hare (Democratic) 48.3%; ▌Charles Foster (Republican) 47.7%; ▌W. H. Likins (Prohibition) 4.0%
Ohio 9	Joseph H. Outhwaite; Redistricted from the 13th district	Democratic	1884	Incumbent re-elected.	▌ ✓ Joseph H. Outhwaite (Democratic) 51.8%; ▌Thomas B. Wilson (Republican) 45.8%; ▌A. Dunlap (Prohibition) 2.4%
Ohio 10	None (new district)			New district. Republican gain.	▌ ✓ Robert E. Doan (Republican) 52.5%; ▌John Quincy Smith (Democratic) 42.2%; ▌R. Rathburn (Prohibition) 5.3%
Ohio 11	Jacob J. Pugsley; Redistricted from the 12th district	Republican	1886	Incumbent retired. Democratic gain.	▌ ✓ John M. Pattison (Democratic) 51.9%; ▌DeWitt Clinton Loudon (Republican) 42.4%; ▌H. W. Rhodes (Union Labor/Farmers' Alliance) 3.1%; ▌S. G. Linsey (Prohibition) 2.6%
Ohio 12	Albert C. Thompson; Redistricted from the 11th district	Republican	1886	Incumbent lost renomination. Republican hold.	▌ ✓ William H. Enochs (Republican) 61.1%; ▌Ezra V. Dean (Democratic) 35.6%; ▌Jonathan Morris (Prohibition) 3.3%
Ohio 12	Charles H. Grosvenor; Redistricted from the 15th district	Republican	1884	Incumbent lost renomination. Republican loss.	▌ ✓ William H. Enochs (Republican) 61.1%; ▌Ezra V. Dean (Democratic) 35.6%; ▌Jonathan Morris (Prohibition) 3.3%
Ohio 13	None (new district)			New district. Democratic gain.	▌ ✓ James I. Dungan (Democratic) 50.7%; ▌William T. Lewis (Republican) 46.1%; ▌William J. Kirkendall (Prohibition) 3.1%
Ohio 14	James W. Owens; Redistricted from the 16th district	Democratic	1888	Incumbent re-elected.	▌ ✓ James W. Owens (Democratic) 53.2%; ▌Samuel Slade (Republican) 43.8%; ▌Arthur S. Caton (Prohibition) 2.9%; ▌J. Junkins (Union Labor) 0.1%
Ohio 15	William C. Cooper; Redistricted from the 9th district	Republican	1884	Incumbent retired. Democratic gain.	▌ ✓ Michael D. Harter (Democratic) 52.5%; ▌George L. Sackett (Republican) 42.6%; ▌William D. Miller (Prohibition) 3.8%; ▌D. T. Adams (Union Labor) 1.1%
Ohio 16	William McKinley; Redistricted from the 18th district	Republican	1884	Incumbent lost re-election. Democratic gain.	▌ ✓ John G. Warwick (Democratic) 49.3%; ▌William McKinley (Republican) 48.6%; ▌John G. Ashenhurst (Prohibition) 2.1%
Ohio 16	Martin L. Smyser; Redistricted from the 20th district	Republican	1888	Incumbent lost renomination. Republican loss.	▌ ✓ John G. Warwick (Democratic) 49.3%; ▌William McKinley (Republican) 48.6%; ▌John G. Ashenhurst (Prohibition) 2.1%
Ohio 17	None (new district)			New district. Democratic gain.	▌ ✓ Albert J. Pearson (Democratic) 49.8%; ▌Christian L. Poorman (Republican) 47.5%; ▌Lawrence C. Crippen (Prohibition) 2.7%
Ohio 18	Joseph D. Taylor; Redistricted from the 17th district	Republican	1886	Incumbent re-elected.	▌ ✓ Joseph D. Taylor (Republican) 56.0%; ▌Henry H. McFadden (Democratic) 38.8%; ▌S. W. Wilkins (Prohibition) 5.2%
Ohio 19	Ezra B. Taylor	Republican	1880	Incumbent re-elected.	▌ ✓ Ezra B. Taylor (Republican) 58.5%; ▌Thomas E. Hoyt (Democratic) 36.1%; ▌Richard Brown (Prohibition) 5.3%
Ohio 20	Charles Preston Wickham; Redistricted from the 14th district	Republican	1886	Incumbent retired. Republican hold.	▌ ✓ Vincent A. Taylor (Republican) 58.1%; ▌Harlan L. Stewart (Democratic) 37.8%; ▌A. S. Root (Prohibition) 4.1%
Ohio 21	Theodore E. Burton	Republican	1888	Incumbent lost re-election. Democratic gain.	▌ ✓ Tom L. Johnson (Democratic) 55.3%; ▌Theodore E. Burton (Republican) 44.7%; ▌E. C. Vail (Union Labor) 0.8%; ▌F. W. Creamer (Prohibition) 0.6%

== Oregon ==
District	Incumbent			This race	
District	Member	Party	First elected	Results	Candidates
Oregon at-large	Binger Hermann	Republican	1884	Incumbent re-elected.	▌ ✓ Binger Hermann (Republican) 54.8%; ▌ Robert A. Miller (Democratic) 41.3%; ▌ James A. Bruce (Prohibition) 3.9%

== Pennsylvania ==
District	Incumbent			This race	
District	Member	Party	First elected	Results	Candidates
Pennsylvania 1	Henry H. Bingham	Republican	1878	Incumbent re-elected.	▌ ✓ Henry H. Bingham (Republican) 60.3%; ▌ Edwin G Flanagan (Democratic) 39.5%; ▌ Samuel M. Kennedy (Prohibition) 0.2%
Pennsylvania 2	Charles O'Neill	Republican	1872	Incumbent re-elected.	▌ ✓ Charles O'Neill (Republican) 62.2%; ▌ Edwin F. Lott (Democratic) 37.3%; ▌ John B. Jones (Prohibition) 0.5%
Pennsylvania 3	Richard Vaux	Democratic	1890	Incumbent lost renomination and lost re-election as an Independent Democratic candidate. Democratic hold.	▌ ✓ William McAleer (Democratic) 56.6%; ▌ Richard Vaux (Independent Democratic) 43.3%; ▌ F. G. Percival (Prohibition) 0.1%
Pennsylvania 4	John E. Reyburn	Republican	1890	Incumbent re-elected.	▌ ✓ John E. Reyburn (Republican) 60.9%; ▌ William M. Ayres (Democratic) 38.4%; ▌ Allwin J. Walker (Prohibition) 0.7%
Pennsylvania 5	Alfred C. Harmer	Republican	1876	Incumbent re-elected.	▌ ✓ Alfred C. Harmer (Republican) 61.2%; ▌ J. Henry Taylor (Democratic) 38.4%; ▌ J. Baker Stewart (Prohibition) 0.4%
Pennsylvania 6	Smedley Darlington	Republican	1886	Incumbent retired. Republican hold.	▌ ✓ John B. Robinson (Republican) 55.0%; ▌ Thomas W. Pierce (Democratic) 42.1%; ▌ J. Simmons Kent (Prohibition) 3.0%
Pennsylvania 7	Robert M. Yardley	Republican	1886	Incumbent retired. Democratic gain.	▌ ✓ Edwin Hallowell (Democratic) 49.5%; ▌ Irving P. Wanger (Republican) 49.1%; ▌ Oliver H. Holcomb (Prohibition) 1.4%
Pennsylvania 8	William Mutchler	Democratic	1888	Incumbent re-elected.	▌ ✓ William Mutchler (Democratic) 62.3%; ▌ George M. Davies (Republican) 37.7%
Pennsylvania 9	David B. Brunner	Democratic	1888	Incumbent re-elected.	▌ ✓ David B. Brunner (Democratic) 62.8%; ▌ Daniel H. Wingerd (Republican) 36.4%; ▌ George W. Gross (Prohibition) 0.8%
Pennsylvania 10	Marriott Brosius	Republican	1888	Incumbent re-elected.	▌ ✓ Marriott Brosius (Republican/Prohibition) 67.5%; ▌ D. F. Magee (Democratic) 32.5%
Pennsylvania 11	Joseph A. Scranton	Republican	1888	Incumbent lost re-election. Democratic gain.	▌ ✓ Lemuel Amerman (Democratic) 48.6%; ▌ Joseph A. Scranton (Republican) 47.0%; ▌ H. T. Hockenbury (Prohibition) 4.4%
Pennsylvania 12	Edwin S. Osborne	Republican	1884	Incumbent retired. Republican hold.	▌ ✓ George W. Shonk (Republican) 51.3%; ▌ John B. Reynolds (Democratic) 46.0%; ▌ Benjamin Harding (Prohibition) 2.7%
Pennsylvania 13	James B. Reilly	Democratic	1888	Incumbent re-elected.	▌ ✓ James B. Reilly (Democratic) 52.9%; ▌ John T. Shoener (Republican) 47.1%
Pennsylvania 14	John W. Rife	Republican	1888	Incumbent re-elected.	▌ ✓ John W. Rife (Republican) 54.8%; ▌ William L. Gorgas (Democratic) 44.0%; ▌ George W. Campbell (Prohibition) 1.2%
Pennsylvania 15	Myron B. Wright	Republican	1888	Incumbent re-elected.	▌ ✓ Myron B. Wright (Republican) 51.8%; ▌ C. W. Canfield (Democratic) 44.7%; ▌ John C. Bateson (Prohibition) 3.5%
Pennsylvania 16	Henry C. McCormick	Republican	1886	Incumbent retired. Republican hold.	▌ ✓ Albert C. Hopkins (Republican) 48.5%; ▌ Mortimer Fitzland Elliott (Democratic) 48.3%; ▌ Herbert T. Ames (Prohibition) 3.2%
Pennsylvania 17	Charles R. Buckalew	Democratic	1886	Incumbent retired. Democratic hold.	▌ ✓ Simon P. Wolverton (Democratic) 60.2%; ▌ W. C. Farnsworth (Republican) 36.6%; ▌ John B. Patton (Prohibition) 3.2%
Pennsylvania 18	Louis E. Atkinson	Republican	1882	Incumbent re-elected.	▌ ✓ Louis E. Atkinson (Republican) 50.9%; ▌ George W. Skinner (Democratic) 49.1%
Pennsylvania 19	Levi Maish	Democratic	1886	Incumbent lost renomination. Democratic hold.	▌ ✓ Frank E. Beltzhoover (Democratic) 58.7%; ▌ D. K. Trimmer (Republican) 39.7%; ▌ John M. Bacheldor (Prohibition) 1.6%
Pennsylvania 20	Edward Scull	Republican	1886	Incumbent re-elected.	▌ ✓ Edward Scull (Republican) 49.5%; ▌ Thomas H. Greevy (Democratic) 48.0%; ▌ George H. Hocking (Prohibition) 2.6%
Pennsylvania 21	Samuel Alfred Craig	Republican	1888	Incumbent lost renomination. Republican hold.	▌ ✓ George F. Huff (Republican) 51.8%; ▌ Jacob Creps (Democratic/Farmers' Alliance) 48.2%
Pennsylvania 22	John Dalzell	Republican	1886	Incumbent re-elected.	▌ ✓ John Dalzell (Republican) 60.9%; ▌ William J. Brennan (Democratic) 38.4%; ▌ J. D. Simons (Prohibition) 0.7%
Pennsylvania 23	Thomas M. Bayne	Republican	1876	Incumbent declined renomination. Republican hold.	▌ ✓ William A. Stone (Republican) 66.8%; ▌ Morrison Foster (Democratic) 32.6%; ▌ David H. Martin (Prohibition) 0.6%
Pennsylvania 24	Joseph W. Ray	Republican	1888	Incumbent lost renomination. Republican hold.	▌ ✓ Andrew Stewart (Republican) 49.0%; ▌ Alexander Kerr Craig (Democratic) 48.7%; ▌ Edward Campbell (Prohibition) 2.3%
Pennsylvania 24	Joseph W. Ray	Republican	1888	Election successfully contested. New member seated February 26, 1892. Democratic gain.	▌ ✓ Alexander Kerr Craig (Democratic); ▌ Andrew Stewart (Republican); ▌ Edward Campbell (Prohibition)
Pennsylvania 25	Charles Champlain Townsend	Republican	1888	Incumbent retired. Democratic gain.	▌ ✓ Eugene P. Gillespie (Democratic) 38.3%; ▌ Thomas Wharton Phillips (Ind. Republican) 29.5%; ▌ Alexander McDowell (Republican) 29.2%; ▌ William P. Braham (Prohibition) 2.8%
Pennsylvania 26	William Constantine Culbertson	Republican	1888	Incumbent lost renomination. Republican hold.	▌ ✓ Matthew Griswold (Republican) 49.8%; ▌ A. L. Tilden (Democratic/Farmers' Alliance) 46.6%; ▌ Hugh Wilson (Prohibition) 3.6%
Pennsylvania 27	Lewis F. Watson	Republican	1888	Incumbent died. Winner also elected to finish term. Republican hold.	▌ ✓ Charles W. Stone (Republican) 54.5%; ▌ Robert W. Dunn (Democratic) 40.3%; ▌ D. H. Boutton (Prohibition) 5.2%
Pennsylvania 28	James Kerr	Democratic	1888	Incumbent lost renomination. Democratic hold.	▌ ✓ George F. Kribbs (Democratic) 56.4%; ▌ Charles E. Andrews (Republican) 41.4%; ▌ Daniel C. Oyster (Prohibition) 2.3%

== Rhode Island ==
District	Incumbent			This race	
District	Member	Party	First elected	Results	Candidates
Rhode Island 1	Henry J. Spooner	Republican	1881	Incumbent lost re-election. Democratic gain.	▌ ✓ Oscar Lapham (Democratic) 52.6%; ▌ Henry J. Spooner (Republican) 43.6%; ▌ Harrison W. Richardson (Prohibition) 2.8%
Rhode Island 2	Warren O. Arnold	Republican	1886	Incumbent lost re-election after declining to participate in run-off election. Democratic gain.	First ballot (November, 1890): ▌ Charles H. Page (Democratic) 47.8%; ▌ Warren O. Arnold (Republican) 47.7%; ▌ John S. Tripp (Prohibition) 4.5%; Second ballot (January, 1891): ▌ ✓ Charles H. Page (Democratic) 85.4%; ▌ Warren O. Arnold (Republican) 8.9%; ▌ John S. Tripp (Prohibition) 5.7%

== South Carolina ==
District	Incumbent			This race	
District	Member	Party	First elected	Results	Candidates
South Carolina 1	Samuel Dibble	Democratic	1882	Incumbent retired. Democratic hold.	▌ ✓ William H. Brawley (Democratic) 84.2%; ▌William D. Crum (Republican) 15.7%; Others 0.1%
South Carolina 2	George D. Tillman	Democratic	1878	Incumbent re-elected.	▌ ✓ George D. Tillman (Democratic) 85.5%; ▌Seymour E. Smith (Republican) 14.3%; Others 0.2%
South Carolina 3	James S. Cothran	Democratic	1886	Incumbent retired. Democratic hold.	▌ ✓ George Johnstone (Democratic) 91.4%; ▌John R. Tolbert (Republican) 8.2%; Others 0.4%
South Carolina 4	William H. Perry	Democratic	1884	Incumbent retired. Democratic hold.	▌ ✓ George W. Shell (Democratic) 81.9%; ▌J. F. Ensor (Republican) 17.8%; Others 0.3%
South Carolina 5	John J. Hemphill	Democratic	1882	Incumbent re-elected.	▌ ✓ John J. Hemphill (Democratic) 87.1%; ▌G. G. Alexander (Republican) 12.2%; Others 0.7%
South Carolina 6	George W. Dargan	Democratic	1882	Incumbent retired. Democratic hold.	▌ ✓ Eli T. Stackhouse (Democratic) 78.8%; ▌Edmund H. Deas (Republican) 20.5%; Others 0.7%
South Carolina 7	Thomas E. Miller	Republican	1888 (Note: After disputed election.)	Incumbent lost re-election. Democratic gain.	▌ ✓ William Elliott (Democratic) 44.4%; ▌Thomas E. Miller (Republican) 38.8%; ▌E. M. Brayton (Ind. Republican) 16.5%; Others 0.3%

== South Dakota ==
District	Incumbent			This race	
District	Member	Party	First elected	Results	Candidates
South Dakota at-large 2 seats on a general ticket	John Pickler	Republican	1889	Incumbent re-elected.	▌ ✓ John Pickler (Republican) 22.65%; ▌ ✓ John R. Gamble (Republican) 22.45%; ▌F. A. Leavitt (Independent) 16.18%; ▌Fred Zipp (Independent) 16.12%; ▌F. A. Clark (Democratic) 11.39%; ▌W. Y. Quigley (Democratic) 11.22%
South Dakota at-large 2 seats on a general ticket	Oscar S. Gifford	Republican	1889	Incumbent lost renomination. Republican hold.	▌ ✓ John Pickler (Republican) 22.65%; ▌ ✓ John R. Gamble (Republican) 22.45%; ▌F. A. Leavitt (Independent) 16.18%; ▌Fred Zipp (Independent) 16.12%; ▌F. A. Clark (Democratic) 11.39%; ▌W. Y. Quigley (Democratic) 11.22%

== Tennessee ==
District	Incumbent			This race	
District	Member	Party	First elected	Results	Candidates
Tennessee 1	Alfred A. Taylor	Republican	1888	Incumbent re-elected.	▌ ✓ Alfred A. Taylor (Republican) 48.98%; ▌Roderick R. Butler (Ind. Republican) 45.79%; ▌A. J. Buenner (Prohibition) 4.54%; ▌P. M. Kiser (Ind. Democratic) 0.69%
Tennessee 2	Leonidas C. Houk	Republican	1878	Incumbent re-elected.	▌ ✓ Leonidas C. Houk (Republican) 60.13%; ▌J. C. Williams (Democratic) 34.75%; ▌S. W. Williams (Democratic) 3.43%; ▌W. C. Murphy (Prohibition) 1.70%
Tennessee 3	H. Clay Evans	Republican	1888	Incumbent lost re-election. Democratic gain.	▌ ✓ Henry C. Snodgrass (Democratic) 50.25%; ▌H. Clay Evans (Republican) 48.35%; ▌J. E. Rogers (Prohibition) 1.40%
Tennessee 4	Benton McMillin	Democratic	1878	Incumbent re-elected.	▌ ✓ Benton McMillin (Democratic) 64.03%; ▌C. W. Garrett (Republican) 33.66%; ▌J. R. Goodpasture (Prohibition) 2.31%
Tennessee 5	James D. Richardson	Democratic	1884	Incumbent re-elected.	▌ ✓ James D. Richardson (Democratic) 69.02%; ▌P. C. Smithsen (Republican) 23.24%; ▌H. R. Moore (Prohibition) 6.93%; ▌P. C. Isbell (Independent) 0.82%
Tennessee 6	Joseph E. Washington	Democratic	1886	Incumbent re-elected.	▌ ✓ Joseph E. Washington (Democratic) 74.40%; ▌Samuel M. Watson (Republican) 17.29%; ▌W. D. Turnley (Prohibition) 8.31%
Tennessee 7	Washington C. Whitthorne	Democratic	1886	Incumbent retired. Democratic hold.	▌ ✓ Nicholas N. Cox (Democratic) 60.86%; ▌A. M. Hughes (Republican) 31.51%; ▌John Graham (Prohibition) 7.63%
Tennessee 8	Benjamin A. Enloe	Democratic	1886	Incumbent re-elected.	▌ ✓ Benjamin A. Enloe (Democratic) 64.07%; ▌J. R. McKinney (Republican) 23.01%; ▌George McCall (Republican) 7.41%; ▌James T. Warren (Prohibition) 5.51%
Tennessee 9	Rice A. Pierce	Democratic	1888	Incumbent re-elected.	▌ ✓ Rice A. Pierce (Democratic) 70.64%; ▌W. F. Poston (Republican) 22.94%; ▌J. B. Cummings (Prohibition) 6.43%
Tennessee 10	James Phelan Jr.	Democratic	1886	Incumbent retired. Democratic hold.	▌ ✓ Josiah Patterson (Democratic) 74.95%; ▌L. B. Eaton (Republican) 24.38%; Others: ▌G. H. McClowan (Prohibition) 0.33%; ▌W. A. Ealey (Unknown) 0.20%; ▌J. W. Ewing (Unknown) 0.15%

== Texas ==
District	Incumbent			This race	
District	Member	Party	First elected	Results	Candidates
Texas 1	Charles Stewart	Democratic	1882	Incumbent re-elected.	▌ ✓ Charles Stewart (Democratic) 63.1%; ▌ E. L. Angier (Republican) 36.8%
Texas 2	William Harrison Martin	Democratic	1887	Incumbent retired. Democratic hold.	▌ ✓ John B. Long (Democratic) 99.6%
Texas 3	Constantine B. Kilgore	Democratic	1886	Incumbent re-elected.	▌ ✓ Constantine B. Kilgore (Democratic) 71.3%; ▌ L. B. Fish (Republican) 27.5%; ▌ John O. Byrne (Prohibition) 1.2%
Texas 4	David B. Culberson	Democratic	1874	Incumbent re-elected.	▌ ✓ David B. Culberson (Democratic) 74.8%; ▌ J. C. Gibbons (Republican) 22.8%; ▌ P. B. Clark (Prohibition) 2.3%
Texas 5	Silas Hare	Democratic	1886	Incumbent lost renomination. Democratic hold.	▌ ✓ Joseph W. Bailey (Democratic) 81.9%; ▌ Alexander W. Achison (Republican) 13.0%; ▌ William R. Lamb (Independent) 5.1%
Texas 6	Jo Abbott	Democratic	1886	Incumbent re-elected.	▌ ✓ Jo Abbott (Democratic) 85.7%; ▌ Isaac Darter (Farmers' Alliance/Labor) 12.7%; ▌ H. W. Barclay (Republican) 1.6%
Texas 7	William H. Crain	Democratic	1884	Incumbent re-elected.	▌ ✓ William H. Crain (Democratic) 67.2%; ▌ J. V. Spohn (Republican) 32.8%
Texas 8	Littleton W. Moore	Democratic	1886	Incumbent re-elected.	▌ ✓ Littleton W. Moore (Democratic) 71.2%; ▌ William Greene (Republican) 28.8%
Texas 9	Roger Q. Mills	Democratic	1872	Incumbent re-elected.	▌ ✓ Roger Q. Mills (Democratic) 79.6%; ▌ D. W. Roberts (Republican) 20.4%
Texas 10	Joseph D. Sayers	Democratic	1884	Incumbent re-elected.	▌ ✓ Joseph D. Sayers (Democratic) 92.4%; ▌ Willis G. Robinson (Republican) 7.2%
Texas 11	S. W. T. Lanham	Democratic	1882	Incumbent re-elected.	▌ ✓ S. W. T. Lanham (Democratic) 97.8%; ▌ C. W. Johnson (Republican) 2.2%

== Utah ==
See Non-voting delegates below.

== Vermont ==
District	Incumbent			This race	
District	Member	Party	First elected	Results	Candidates
Vermont 1	John W. Stewart	Republican	1882	Incumbent retired. Republican hold.	▌ ✓ H. Henry Powers (Republican) 66.5%; ▌Thomas W. Moloney (Democratic) 33.4%
Vermont 2	William W. Grout	Republican	1880; 1882 (lost); 1884	Incumbent re-elected.	▌ ✓ William W. Grout (Republican) 66.8%; ▌Stephen C. Shurtleff (Democratic) 33.1%

== Virginia ==
District	Incumbent			This race	
District	Member	Party	First elected	Results	Candidates
Virginia 1	Thomas H. B. Browne	Republican	1886	Incumbent lost re-election. Democratic gain.	▌ ✓ William A. Jones (Democratic) 54.3%; ▌Thomas H. B. Browne (Republican) 45.2%
Virginia 2	George E. Bowden	Republican	1886	Incumbent lost re-election. Democratic gain.	▌ ✓ John W. Lawson (Democratic) 50.7%; ▌George E. Bowden (Republican) 46.3%
Virginia 3	Edmund Waddill Jr.	Republican	1888	Incumbent retired. Democratic gain.	▌ ✓ George D. Wise (Democratic) 99.9%
Virginia 4	John M. Langston	Republican	1888	Incumbent lost re-election. Democratic gain.	▌ ✓ James F. Epes (Democratic) 57.1%; ▌John M. Langston (Republican) 42.8%
Virginia 5	Posey G. Lester	Democratic	1888	Incumbent re-elected.	▌ ✓ Posey G. Lester (Democratic) 82.0%; ▌S. C. Adams (Independent) 10.6%; ▌J. Ring (Independent) 7.4%
Virginia 6	Paul C. Edmunds	Democratic	1886	Incumbent re-elected.	▌ ✓ Paul C. Edmunds (Democratic) 92.6%; ▌William J. Shelburne (Prohibition) 7.2%
Virginia 7	Charles T. O'Ferrall	Democratic	1884	Incumbent re-elected	▌ ✓ Charles T. O'Ferrall (Democratic) 89.0%; ▌I. M. Underwood (Prohibition) 10.7%
Virginia 8	W. H. F. Lee	Democratic	1886	Incumbent re-elected.	▌ ✓ W. H. F. Lee (Democratic) 57.0%; ▌Frank Hume (Ind. Democratic) 43.0%
Virginia 9	John A. Buchanan	Democratic	1888	Incumbent re-elected.	▌ ✓ John A. Buchanan (Democratic) 56.1%; ▌George T. Mills (Republican) 43.9%
Virginia 10	Henry St. George Tucker	Democratic	1888	Incumbent re-elected	▌ ✓ Henry St. George Tucker (Democratic) 94.6%; ▌A. J. Taylor (Independent) 5.2%

== Washington ==
District	Incumbent			This race	
District	Member	Party	First elected	Results	Candidates
Washington at-large	John L. Wilson	Republican	1888	Incumbent re-elected.	▌ ✓ John L. Wilson (Republican) 56.0%; ▌Thomas Carroll (Democratic) 44.0%

== West Virginia ==
District	Incumbent			This race	
District	Member	Party	First elected	Results	Candidates
West Virginia 1	George W. Atkinson	Republican	1888	Incumbent retired. Democratic gain.	▌ ✓ John O. Pendleton (Democratic) 49.62%; ▌William P. Hubbard (Republican) 49.03%; ▌Francis M. Lynch (Prohibition) 1.16%; ▌C. H. Davis (Union Labor) 0.20%
West Virginia 2	William L. Wilson	Democratic	1882	Incumbent re-elected.	▌ ✓ William L. Wilson (Democratic) 51.20%; ▌George Hourian (Republican) 48.39%; Others: ▌Aaron Baker (Prohibition) 0.36%; ▌John M. Hancock (Union Labor) 0.05%
West Virginia 3	John D. Alderson	Democratic	1888	Incumbent re-elected.	▌ ✓ John D. Alderson (Democratic) 56.06%; ▌Theophilus Gaines (Republican) 43.29%; ▌J. E. Middleton (Prohibition) 0.65%
West Virginia 4	Charles B. Smith	Republican	1888	Incumbent lost re-election. Democratic gain.	▌ ✓ James Capehart (Democratic) 51.09%; ▌Charles B. Smith (Republican) 48.40%; ▌M. S. Hall (Prohibition) 0.52%

== Wisconsin ==
Wisconsin elected nine members of congress on Election Day, November 4, 1890.

District	Incumbent			This race	
District	Member	Party	First elected	Results	Candidates
Wisconsin 1	Lucien B. Caswell	Republican	1884	Incumbent lost renomination. Democratic gain.	▌ ✓ Clinton Babbitt (Democratic) 48.3%; ▌Henry Allen Cooper (Republican) 47.3%; ▌Stephen Faville (Prohibition) 4.4%
Wisconsin 2	Charles Barwig	Democratic	1888	Incumbent re-elected.	▌ ✓ Charles Barwig (Democratic) 65.8%; ▌D. C. Van Brunt (Republican) 34.2%
Wisconsin 3	Robert M. La Follette	Republican	1884	Incumbent lost re-election. Democratic gain.	▌ ✓ Allen R. Bushnell (Democratic) 49.2%; ▌Robert M. La Follette (Republican) 46.2%; ▌Marion Ames (Prohibition) 4.7%
Wisconsin 4	Isaac W. Van Schaick	Republican	1888	Incumbent retired. Democratic gain.	▌ ✓ John L. Mitchell (Democratic) 56.0%; ▌Robert C. Spencer (Republican) 40.0%; ▌Robert C. Schilling (Union Labor) 3.6%; ▌Charles E. Reed (Prohibition) 0.3%
Wisconsin 5	George H. Brickner	Democratic	1888	Incumbent re-elected.	▌ ✓ George H. Brickner (Democratic) 67.2%; ▌Thomas M. Blackstock (Republican) 30.7%; ▌George McKenney (Prohibition) 2.1%
Wisconsin 6	Charles B. Clark	Republican	1886	Incumbent lost re-election. Democratic gain.	▌ ✓ Lucas M. Miller (Democratic) 51.7%; ▌Charles B. Clark (Republican) 44.5%; ▌George W. Gates (Prohibition) 3.8%
Wisconsin 7	Ormsby B. Thomas	Republican	1884	Incumbent lost re-election. Democratic gain.	▌ ✓ Frank P. Coburn (Democratic) 50.8%; ▌Ormsby B. Thomas (Republican) 44.2%; ▌Sylvanus Holmes (Prohibition) 4.9%
Wisconsin 8	Nils P. Haugen	Republican	1887	Incumbent re-elected.	▌ ✓ Nils P. Haugen (Republican) 49.2%; ▌William F. Bailey (Democratic) 42.7%; ▌W. C. Jones (Prohibition) 8.1%
Wisconsin 9	Myron H. McCord	Republican	1888	Incumbent lost re-election. Democratic gain.	▌ ✓ Thomas Lynch (Democratic) 54.4%; ▌Myron H. McCord (Republican) 42.6%; ▌J. H. Vrooman (Prohibition) 2.9%; ▌George Wilbur Peck (Write-in) 0.1%

== Wyoming ==
Republican Clarence D. Clark was elected over Democrat George T. Beck in a single ballot both to finish the current term (ending 1891) and the next term (beginning 1891).

District	Incumbent			This race	
District	Member	Party	First elected	Results	Candidates
Wyoming at-large	Vacant (new seat)			Republican gain.	▌ ✓ Clarence D. Clark (Republican) 58.22%; ▌George T. Beck (Democratic) 41.78%

== Non-voting delegates ==
=== 51st Congress ===
District	Incumbent			This race	
District	Delegate	Party	First elected	Results	Candidates
Oklahoma Territory at-large	New seat			New seat. New delegate elected to finish the current term. Republican gain.	▌ ✓ David Archibald Harvey (Republican); [data missing]

=== 52nd Congress ===
District	Incumbent			This race	
District	Delegate	Party	First elected	Results	Candidates
Arizona Territory at-large
New Mexico Territory at-large
Oklahoma Territory at-large	New seat			New seat. New delegate elected to the next term. Republican gain.	▌ ✓ David Archibald Harvey (Republican); [data missing]
Utah Territory at-large	John T. Caine	Populist	1882	Incumbent re-elected	▌ ✓ John T. Caine (Populist); [data missing]

== See also ==
- 1890 United States elections
  - 1890–91 United States Senate elections
- 51st United States Congress
- 52nd United States Congress

== Bibliography ==
- Dubin, Michael J. (March 1, 1998). United States Congressional Elections, 1788-1997: The Official Results of the Elections of the 1st Through 105th Congresses. McFarland and Company. ISBN 978-0786402830.
- Martis, Kenneth C. (January 1, 1989). The Historical Atlas of Political Parties in the United States Congress, 1789-1989. Macmillan Publishing Company. ISBN 978-0029201701.
- Moore, John L., ed. (1994). Congressional Quarterly's Guide to U.S. Elections (Third ed.). Congressional Quarterly Inc. ISBN 978-0871879967.
- "Party Divisions of the House of Representatives* 1789–Present". Office of the Historian, House of United States House of Representatives.
