= William Tyndall (disambiguation) =

William Tyndall was a U.S. representative.

William Tyndall may also refer to:

- William Tyndall (MP) for Bristol (UK Parliament constituency), 1558
- William Tyndale, an alternate spelling
