= Norman A. Mozley =

American politician (1865–1922)

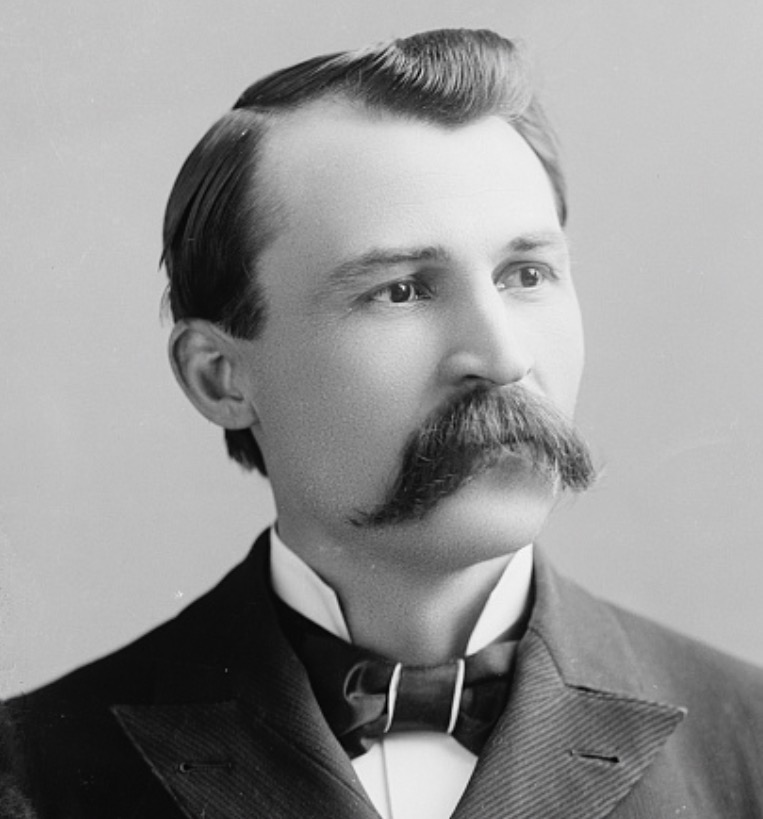
- Portrait of Mozley by Charles Milton Bell, between February 1894 and February 1901

Member of the U.S. House of Representatives from Missouri's 14th district
- In office March 4, 1895 – March 3, 1897
- Preceded by: Marshall Arnold
- Succeeded by: Willard Duncan Vandiver

Personal details
- Born: December 11, 1865 Johnson County, Illinois, US
- Died: May 9, 1922 (aged 56) Bloomfield, Missouri, US
- Party: Republican
- Occupation: Politician, lawyer

Norman Adolphus Mozley (December 11, 1865 – May 9, 1922) was an American politician and lawyer. A Republican, he was a member of the United States House of Representatives from Missouri.

== Biography ==
Mozley was born on December 11, 1865, in Johnson County, Illinois. He grew up on a farm and received his education from common schools. In March 1887, he moved to Stoddard County, Missouri, where he worked as an educator. He studied law, and in 1891, was admitted to the bar, after which he commenced practice in Bloomfield, Missouri. He later moved to Dexter. On March 25, 1895, he married Effie Smith. He had children.

Mozley was a Republican. He served in the United States House of Representatives from March 4, 1895, to March 3, 1897, representing Missouri's 14th district. He served in the 54th United States Congress and was the youngest Congressman during his tenure, as well as the first Republican elected by the 14th district. He lost the primaries for the following election. In 1906, he unsuccessfully ran for judge of the Springfield Court of Appeals. He was a delegate at-large to the 1921 Missouri Constitutional Convention, and was a bipartisan delegate-elected at-large to the 1922 Convention. In the 1922 Convention, he opposed the proposed changes. He died while a delegate to the 1922 Convention.

After serving in Congress, Mozley returned to practicing law. From April 12, 1919, to July 1921, he was commissioner of the Supreme Court of Missouri. He later moved to Poplar Bluff, where he practiced law. He died on May 9, 1922, aged 56, in Bloomfield, from illness. He was buried at Bloomfield Cemetery.

U.S. House of Representatives
Preceded by Marshall Arnold	Member of the U.S. House of Representatives from Missouri's 14th congressional district 1895–1897	Succeeded by Willard Duncan Vandiver
