= Charles A. Crow =

American politician

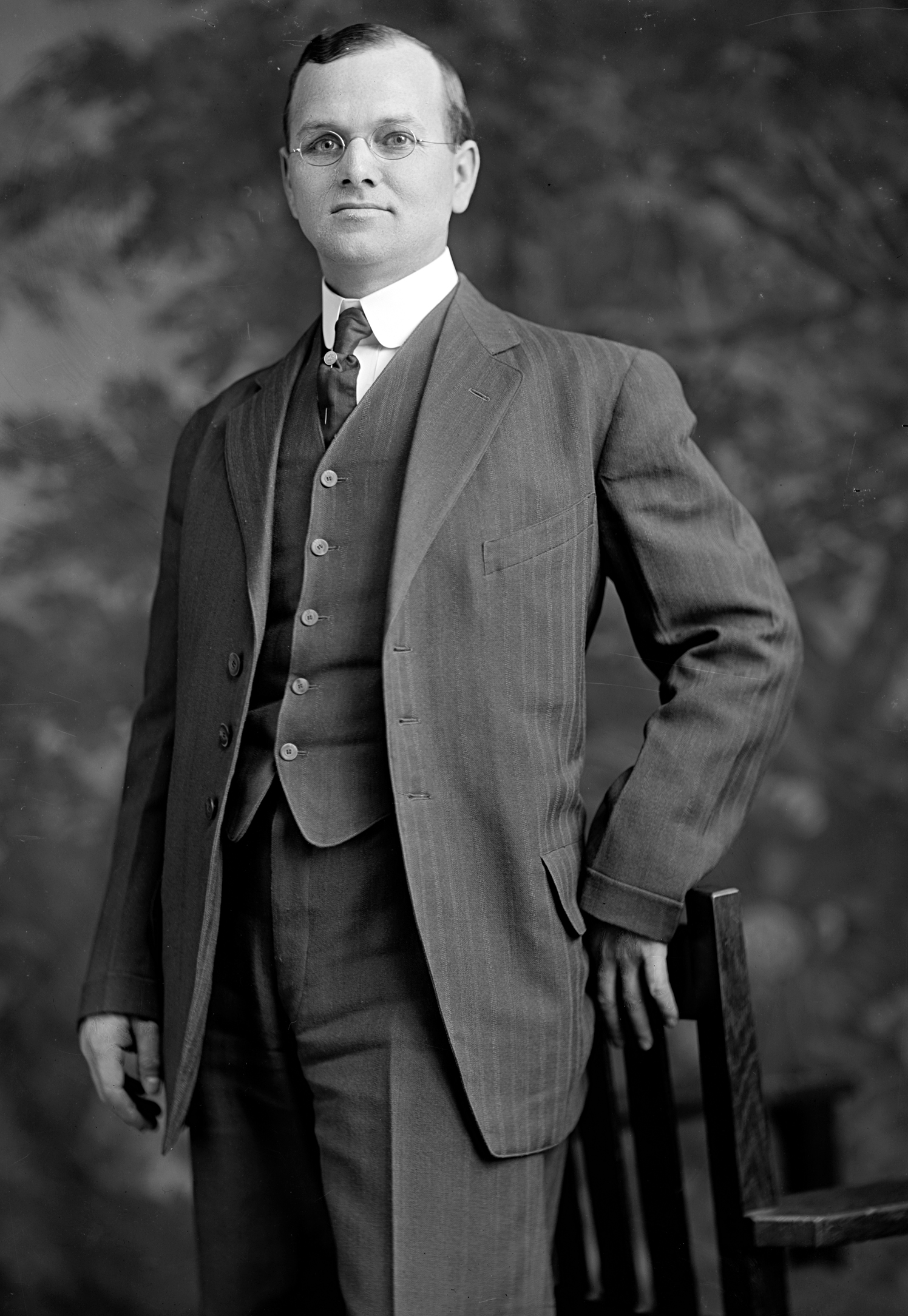

Member of the U.S. House of Representatives from Missouri's 14th district
- In office March 4, 1909 – March 3, 1911
- Preceded by: Joseph J. Russell
- Succeeded by: Joseph J. Russell

Personal details
- Born: Charles Augustus Crow; March 31, 1873 Sikeston, Missouri, U.S.
- Died: March 20, 1938 (aged 64) Campbell, Missouri, U.S.
- Party: Republican
- Spouse: Emma Gardner
- Relatives: Sheryl Crow (great-granddaughter)

Charles Augustus Crow (March 31, 1873 – March 20, 1938) was a U.S. representative from Missouri.

== Biography ==
Born on a farm near Sikeston, Missouri, Crow attended the common schools. He moved to a farm near Bernie, Missouri, in August 1896 and engaged in agricultural pursuits. He moved to Caruthersville, Pemiscot County, in 1901 and engaged in the real estate and insurance business. He was postmaster of Caruthersville from May 19, 1902, to January 14, 1909.

Crow was elected as a Republican to the Sixty-first Congress (March 4, 1909 – March 3, 1911). He was an unsuccessful candidate for reelection in 1910 to the Sixty-second Congress. He moved to Campbell, Missouri, in 1911 and resumed agricultural pursuits. He also engaged in the real estate and insurance business. He died in Campbell, Missouri, March 20, 1938, at the age of 64. He was interred in Woodlawn Cemetery.

He is one of singer Sheryl Crow's great-grandfathers.

U.S. House of Representatives
Preceded by Joseph J. Russell	Member of the U.S. House of Representatives from Missouri's 14th congressional district 1909–1911	Succeeded by Joseph Russell
