= Missouri's 14th congressional district =

Former U.S. House district

- Obsolete district
- Created: 1880
- Eliminated: 1930
- Years active: 1883-1933

The 14th congressional district of Missouri was a congressional district for the United States House of Representatives in Missouri from 1883 to 1933.

== List of members representing the district ==
Member	Party	Years	Cong ress	Electoral history
District created March 4, 1883
Lowndes H. Davis (Jackson)	Democratic	March 4, 1883 – March 3, 1885	48th	Redistricted from the 4th district and re-elected in 1882. Retired.
William Dawson (New Madrid)	Democratic	March 4, 1885 – March 3, 1887	49th	Elected in 1884. Lost renomination.
James P. Walker (Dexter)	Democratic	March 4, 1887 – July 19, 1890	50th 51st	Elected in 1886. Re-elected in 1888. Died.
Vacant		July 19, 1890 – November 4, 1890	51st	
Robert H. Whitelaw (Cape Girardeau)	Democratic	November 4, 1890 – March 3, 1891	51st	Elected to finish Walker's term. Retired.
Marshall Arnold (Benton)	Democratic	March 4, 1891 – March 3, 1895	52nd 53rd	Elected in 1890. Re-elected in 1892. Lost re-election.
Norman A. Mozley (Dexter)	Republican	March 4, 1895 – March 3, 1897	54th	Elected in 1894. Retired.
Willard D. Vandiver (Cape Girardeau)	Democratic	March 4, 1897 – March 3, 1905	55th 56th 57th 58th	Elected in 1896. Re-elected in 1898. Re-elected in 1900. Re-elected in 1902. Retired.
William T. Tyndall (Sparta)	Republican	March 4, 1905 – March 3, 1907	59th	Elected in 1904. Lost re-election.
Joseph J. Russell (Charleston)	Democratic	March 4, 1907 – March 3, 1909	60th	Elected in 1906. Lost re-election.
Charles A. Crow (Caruthersville)	Republican	March 4, 1909 – March 3, 1911	61st	Elected in 1908. Lost re-election.
Joseph J. Russell (Charleston)	Democratic	March 4, 1911 – March 3, 1919	62nd 63rd 64th 65th	Elected in 1910. Re-elected in 1912. Re-elected in 1914. Re-elected in 1916. Lost re-election.
Edward D. Hays (Cape Girardeau)	Republican	March 4, 1919 – March 3, 1923	66th 67th	Elected in 1918. Re-elected in 1920. Lost re-election.
James F. Fulbright (Doniphan)	Democratic	March 4, 1923 – March 3, 1925	68th	Elected in 1922. Lost re-election.
Ralph E. Bailey (Sikeston)	Republican	March 4, 1925 – March 3, 1927	69th	Elected in 1924. Retired.
James F. Fulbright (Doniphan)	Democratic	March 4, 1927 – March 3, 1929	70th	Elected in 1926. Lost re-election.
Dewey Short (Galena)	Republican	March 4, 1929 – March 3, 1931	71st	Elected in 1928; Lost re-election.
James F. Fulbright (Doniphan)	Democratic	March 4, 1931 – March 3, 1933	72nd	Elected in 1930. Redistricted to the At-large district and lost renomination.
District eliminated March 3, 1933
