= Lloyds, Virginia =

Unincorporated community in Virginia, United States

- Unincorporated community
- Location within Virginia Location within the United States
- Coordinates: 38°00′03″N 77°00′54″W
- Country: United States
- State: Virginia
- County: Essex
- Elevation: 151 ft (46 m)
- Time zone: UTC-5 (Eastern (EST))
  - Summer (DST): UTC-4 (EDT)
- Area code: 804
- GNIS feature ID: 1495854

Lloyds is an unincorporated community in Essex County, Virginia, United States.

== Notable people ==
- Robert H. Whitelaw (1854–1937), politician
