= Joseph J. Russell =

American politician (1854–1922)

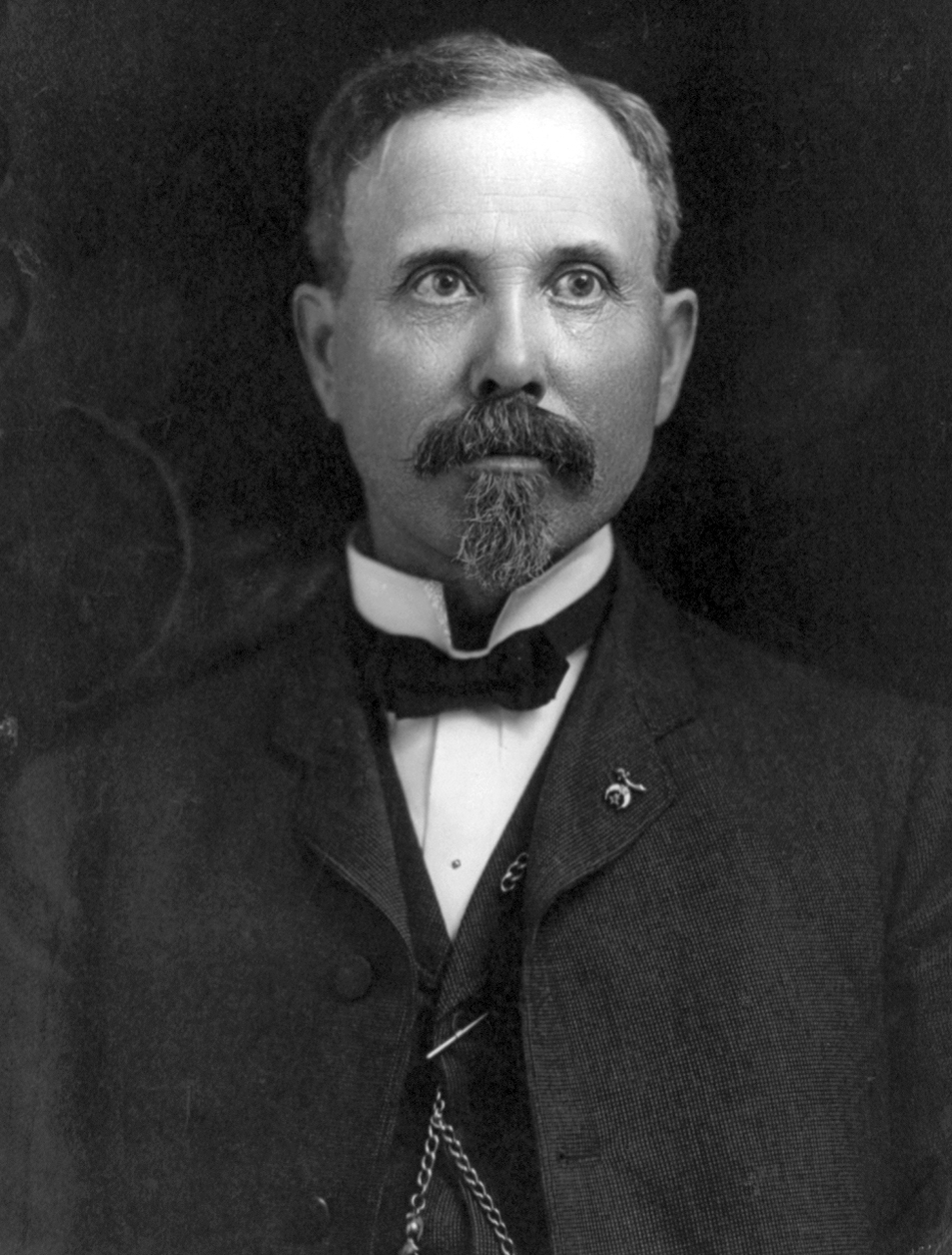
- Russell, c. 1904

Member of the U.S. House of Representatives from Missouri's 14th district
- In office March 4, 1907 – March 3, 1909
- Preceded by: William T. Tyndall
- Succeeded by: Charles A. Crow
- In office March 4, 1911 – March 3, 1919
- Preceded by: Charles A. Crow
- Succeeded by: Edward D. Hays

Personal details
- Born: Joseph James Russell; August 23, 1854 Mississippi County, Missouri, U.S.
- Died: October 22, 1922 (aged 68) Charleston, Missouri, U.S.
- Party: Democratic
- Education: University of Missouri
- Occupation: Lawyer

Joseph James Russell (August 23, 1854 – October 22, 1922) was a U.S. representative from Missouri.

== Biography ==
Born in Mississippi County near Charleston, Missouri, Russell attended the public schools and Charleston Academy. He was admitted to the bar in 1876 and commenced practice in Charleston, Missouri. He graduated from the law department of the University of Missouri in 1880. He served as School commissioner for Mississippi County in 1878 and 1879. He served as prosecuting attorney from 1880–1884. He served as a delegate to the Democratic National Convention in 1884. He served as a member of the State house of representatives in 1886–1890 and served as speaker pro tempore of the house in 1886 and as speaker in 1888.

Russell was elected as a Democrat to the Sixtieth Congress (March 4, 1907 – March 3, 1909). He was an unsuccessful candidate for reelection in 1908 to the Sixty-first Congress.

Russell was elected to the Sixty-second and to the three succeeding Congresses (March 4, 1911 – March 3, 1919). He was an unsuccessful candidate for reelection in 1918 to the Sixty-sixth Congress. He died in Charleston, Missouri, October 22, 1922. He was interred in the Odd Fellows Cemetery.

Political offices
Preceded by J. W. Alexander	Speaker of the Missouri House of Representatives; 1889– 1890	Succeeded by Wilbur F. Tuttle
U.S. House of Representatives
Preceded by William T. Tyndall	Member of the U.S. House of Representatives from Missouri's 14th congressional district 1907–1909	Succeeded by Charles A. Crow
Preceded by Charles A. Crow	Member of the U.S. House of Representatives from Missouri's 14th congressional district 1911–1919	Succeeded by Edward D. Hays
