= William Dawson (Missouri politician) =

American politician (1848–1929)

Member of the U.S. House of Representatives from Missouri's 14th district
- In office March 4, 1885 – March 3, 1887
- Preceded by: Lowndes H. Davis
- Succeeded by: James P. Walker

Member of the Missouri House of Representatives
- In office 1878–1884

Personal details
- Born: March 17, 1848 New Madrid, Missouri, U.S.
- Died: October 12, 1929 (aged 81) New Madrid, Missouri, U.S.
- Resting place: Evergreen Cemetery
- Party: Democratic
- Profession: Politician

William Dawson (March 17, 1848 – October 12, 1929) was a U.S. representative from Missouri.

Born in New Madrid, Missouri, Dawson was graduated from Christian Brothers' College in St. Louis, Missouri in 1869.

Dawson was elected sheriff and collector of New Madrid County in 1870 and 1872. He served as a member of the state House of Representatives in 1878–1884. Dawson was elected as a Democrat to the 49th Congress from Missouri's 14th congressional district, serving from March 4, 1885 to March 3, 1887.

He was an unsuccessful candidate for renomination in 1886. He engaged in the land business in New Madrid and served as clerk of the New Madrid County Circuit Court of 1915–1927. He died in New Madrid in 1929 and is interred in Evergreen Cemetery.

U.S. House of Representatives
Preceded by Lowndes H. Davis	Member of the U.S. House of Representatives from Missouri's 14th congressional district 1885-1887	Succeeded by James P. Walker
