= Lowndes H. Davis =

American politician (1836–1920)

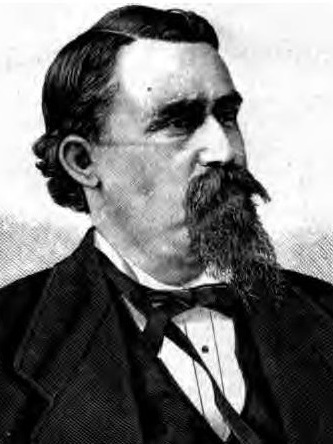
- Illustration from 1882's Public Men of To-Day

Member of the U.S. House of Representatives from Missouri
- In office March 4, 1879 – March 3, 1885
- Preceded by: Robert Anthony Hatcher
- Succeeded by: William Dawson
- Constituency: 4th district (1879–1883); 14th district (1883–1885)

Personal details
- Born: Lowndes Henry Davis; December 13, 1836 Jackson, Missouri, U.S.
- Died: February 4, 1920 (aged 83) Cape Girardeau, Missouri, U.S.
- Resting place: Maple Hill Cemetery in Huntsville, Alabama
- Party: Democratic

Lowndes Henry Davis (December 13, 1836 – February 4, 1920) was an American politician who served the state of Missouri in the U.S. House of Representatives between 1879 and 1885. He was born on December 13, 1836, in Jackson, Cape Girardeau County, Missouri. He graduated from Yale College in 1860, where he was a member of Skull and Bones, and from Louisville University Law School in 1863. He was admitted to the bar and practiced law in Jackson, Missouri. Between 1868 and 1872, Davis served as state attorney for the tenth judicial district of Missouri. He served as a member of the Missouri constitutional convention in 1875, and as a member of the Missouri House of Representatives between 1876 and 1878.

Davis was elected in 1878 as a Democrat to the U.S. House of Representatives from Missouri. He served three terms, until 1885, and was chairman of the Committee on Expenditures in the Department of the Treasury for the 48th Congress) (1883–1885). He died in Cape Girardeau, Missouri, on February 4, 1920, and was buried in Maple Hill Cemetery in Huntsville, Alabama.

U.S. House of Representatives
Preceded by Robert Anthony Hatcher	Member of the U.S. House of Representatives from Missouri's 4th congressional district 1879–1883	Succeeded by James N. Burnes
Preceded by District created	Member of the U.S. House of Representatives from Missouri's 14th congressional district 1883-1885	Succeeded by William Dawson
