= Willard Duncan Vandiver =

American politician (1854–1932)

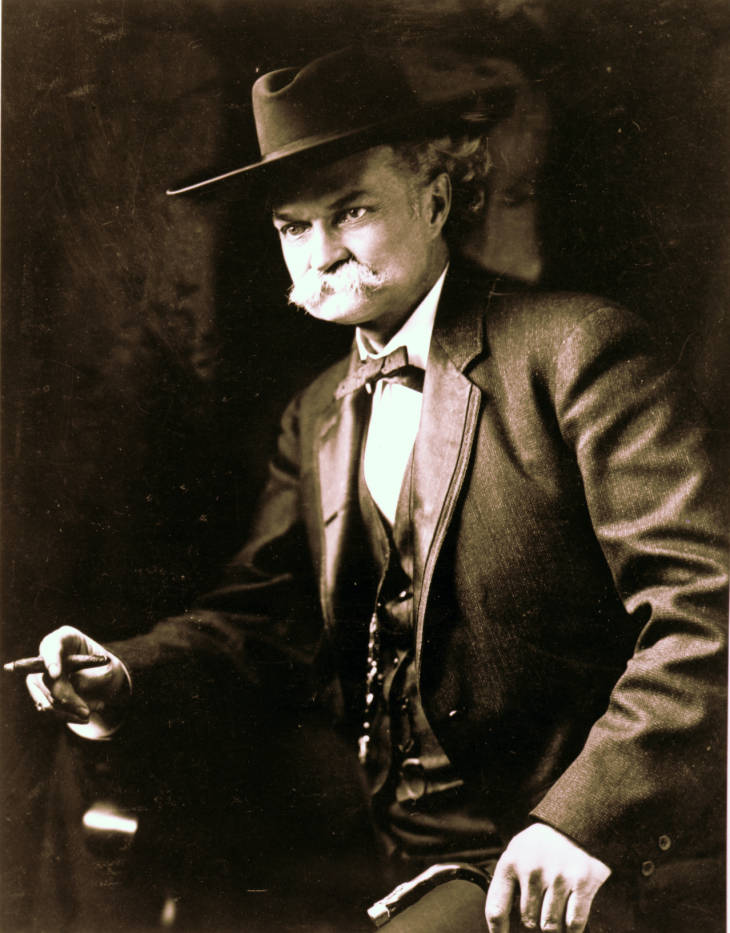
- From The State Historical Society of Missouri Digital Collections

Member of the U.S. House of Representatives from Missouri's 14th district
- In office March 4, 1897 – March 3, 1905
- Preceded by: Norman Adolphus Mozley
- Succeeded by: William T. Tyndall

Personal details
- Born: March 30, 1854 Moorefield, Virginia (now West Virginia), U.S.
- Died: May 30, 1932 (aged 78) Missouri
- Party: Democratic
- Known for: Allegedly coining Missouri's nickname as the "Show Me State"

Willard Duncan Vandiver (March 30, 1854 – May 30, 1932) was a Democratic member of the United States House of Representatives from the state of Missouri. He is popularly credited with the authorship of the famous expression: "I'm from Missouri, you've got to show me," which led to the state's famous nickname: "The Show Me State". In an 1899 speech, he declared, "I come from a state that raises corn and cotton, cockleburs and Democrats, and frothy eloquence neither convinces nor satisfies me. I'm from Missouri, and you have got to show me." This attribution is doubtful, however, as the phrase was current earlier in the 1890s, so it appears that Vandiver merely popularized it.

== Early life ==
Born near Moorefield, Virginia, now a part of West Virginia, he moved to Missouri with his parents, who settled on a farm in Boone County in 1857, and to Fayette in 1872.

== Academia ==
He graduated from Central College in 1877; studied law, and became a professor of natural science at the Bellevue Institute from 1877 to 1880 and served as its president in 1880–1889; accepted the chair of science in the Missouri State Normal School at Cape Girardeau, Missouri in 1889, and became its president in 1893 and served until 1897.

== Politics ==
He was a delegate to the Democratic State conventions in 1896, 1898, 1918, and 1920 and served as chairman in 1918. Vandiver was elected as a Democrat to the Fifty-fifth United States Congress in 1896, and was re-elected three times. He was not a candidate for renomination in 1904. Vandiver served as chairman of the State executive committee in 1904, State insurance commissioner of Missouri 1905–1909, vice president of the Central States Life Insurance Co. 1910–1912, and Assistant Treasurer of the United States in 1913–1921.

He retired and settled on a farm near Columbia, Missouri. He died on May 30, 1932, and is buried in the Columbia Cemetery.

U.S. House of Representatives
Preceded by Norman A. Mozley	Member of the U.S. House of Representatives from Missouri's 14th congressional district 1897–1905	Succeeded by William T. Tyndall
