= Robert H. Whitelaw =

American politician (1854–1937)

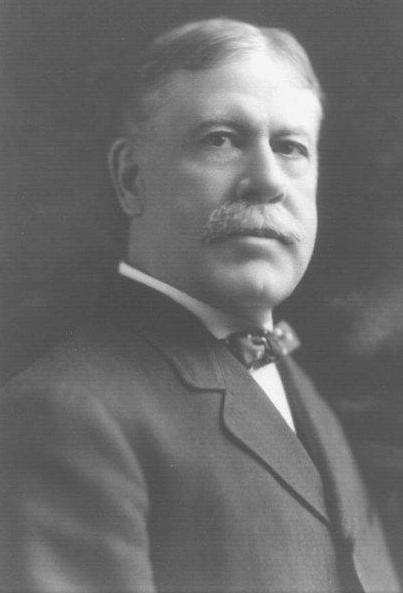

Member of the U.S. House of Representatives from Missouri's 14th district
- In office November 4, 1890 – March 3, 1891
- Preceded by: James P. Walker
- Succeeded by: Marshall Arnold

Member of the Missouri House of Representatives from the Cape Girardeau County district
- In office 1883–1884
- In office 1887–1888

Personal details
- Born: Robert Henry Whitelaw; January 30, 1854 near Lloyds, Virginia, US
- Died: July 27, 1937 (aged 83) Blytheville, Arkansas, US
- Resting place: Lorimier Cemetery, Cape Girardeau, Missouri, U.S.
- Party: Democratic
- Education: University of Michigan Law School
- Occupation: Politician, lawyer

Robert Henry Whitelaw (January 30, 1854 – July 27, 1937) was an American politician and lawyer. A Democrat, he was a member of the United States House of Representatives from Missouri.

== Biography ==
Whitelaw was born on January 30, 1854, on a farm near Lloyds, Virginia. In 1856 or 1859, he and his father moved to Cape Girardeau, Missouri, though returned to Virginia in 1866. He was educated at private schools between Tappahannock and Staunton, then the University of Michigan Law School. He was admitted to the bar in 1873, after which he commenced practice in Cape Girardeau.

Whitelaw was a Democrat, though economically aligned with the Greenback Party. In 1873, he was city attorney of Cape Girardeau. From 1874 to 1878, he was prosecutor of Cape Girardeau County. He represented Cape Girardeau County in the Missouri House of Representatives from 1883 to 1884, and from 1887 to 1888. Following the death of politician James P. Walker, he was elected to serve Missouri's 14th district in the United States House of Representatives. He served from November 4, 1890, to March 3, 1891. He declined to run in the following election.

After serving in Congress, Whitelaw returned to practicing law in Cape Girardeau. In 1899, he again became city attorney, and in the election, ran under three party tickets. He retired in 1927, moving to Blodgett, Missouri, then to Blytheville, Arkansas, in 1927 and 1934, respectively. He was married to Katie Block Whitelaw, and they had three children together. He died on July 27, 1937, aged 83, at a hospital in Blytheville. He was buried at Lorimier Cemetery, in Cape Girardeau.

U.S. House of Representatives
Preceded by James P. Walker	Member of the U.S. House of Representatives from Missouri's 14th congressional district 1890-1891	Succeeded by Marshall Arnold
