= Marshall Arnold =

American politician (1845–1913)

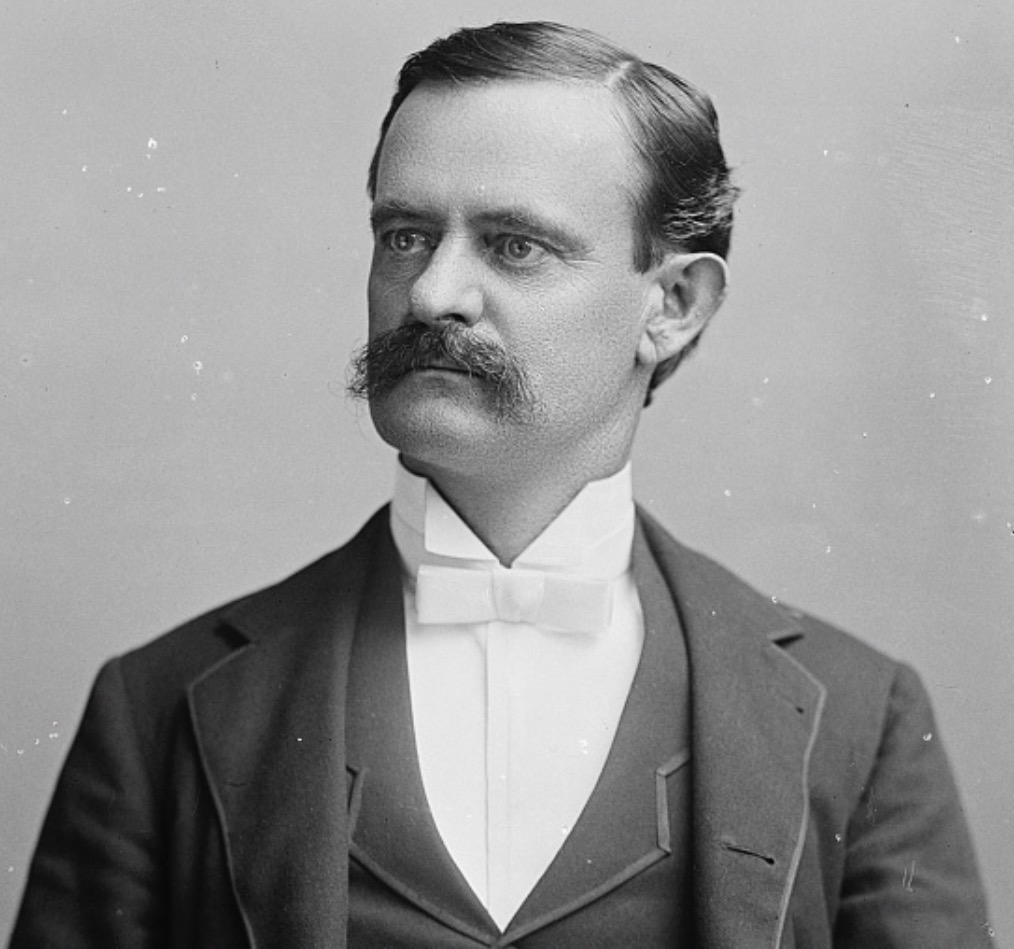
- Portrait of Arnold by Charles Milton Bell

Member of the U.S. House of Representatives from Missouri's 14th district
- In office March 4, 1891 – March 3, 1895
- Preceded by: Robert H. Whitelaw
- Succeeded by: Norman A. Mozley

Member of the Missouri House of Representatives
- In office 1877–1879

Personal details
- Born: October 21, 1845 near Farmington, Missouri, US
- Died: June 12, 1913 (aged 67) Benton, Missouri, US
- Party: Democratic
- Children: 5
- Occupation: Politician, lawyer

Military service
- Allegiance: Confederate States of America
- Branch/service: Confederate States Army
- Battles/wars: American Civil War

Marshall Arnold (October 21, 1845 – June 12, 1913) was an American politician and lawyer. A Democrat, he was a member of the United States House of Representatives from Missouri.

== Biography ==
Arnold was born on October 21, 1845, at Cook Settlement, near Farmington, Missouri, the son of Elisha Arnold and Elvira M. (née Calland) Arnold. He grew up on his parents' farm and received his education at common schools. During the American Civil War, he served in the Confederate States Army, serving towards the end of the war.

After the war ended, Arnold returned to working on his parents' farm, also working as a miner. He studied at Arcadia College and, between 1870 and 1871, worked as a mathematics professor there. Alongside his education, he served as deputy clerk of St. Francois County. He studied law, and in 1870 or 1872, was admitted to the bar, after which he commenced practice in Commerce. He was a highly successful lawyer in Missouri.

Arnold was a Democrat. From 1873 to 1876, he served as prosecutor of Scott County. He gained his political notoriety while prosecutor, as he worked to "carpetbagger" rule in Missouri. He was a member of the Missouri House of Representatives from 1877 to 1879. In 1880, he was a presidential elector. He represented Missouri's 14th congressional district in the United States House of Representatives, from March 4, 1891, to March 3, 1895. He lost the following election. He was a delegate to numerous Democratic National Conventions, such as in 1896.

After serving in Congress, Arnold returned to practicing law, now in Benton. He married Annie E. Parrott was a young adult; they had five children together. He was a Freemason. He was a strong speaker. He was also short, with one writer comparing him to Napoleon. He died on June 12, 1913, aged 67, in Benton, from tuberculosis. He was buried at Benton Cemetery.

U.S. House of Representatives
Preceded by Robert H. Whitelaw	Member of the U.S. House of Representatives from Missouri's 14th congressional district 1891–1895	Succeeded by Norman A. Mozley
