= James P. Walker =

American politician (1851–1890)

James Peter Walker
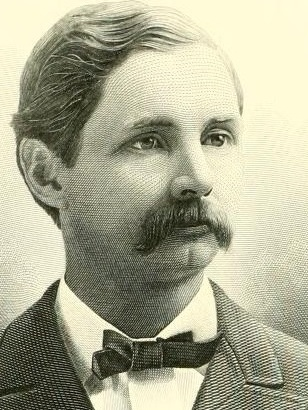
- Illustration 1891's Memorial Addresses on the Life and Character of James P. Walker

Member of the U.S. House of Representatives from Missouri's 14th district
- In office March 4, 1887 – July 19, 1890
- Preceded by: William Dawson
- Succeeded by: Robert Henry Whitelaw

Personal details
- Born: March 14, 1851 Memphis, Tennessee, U.S.
- Died: July 19, 1890 (aged 39) Dexter, Missouri, U.S.
- Cause of death: 1889–1890 flu pandemic
- Party: Democratic

James Peter Walker (March 14, 1851 – July 19, 1890) was a U.S. representative from Missouri.

== Early years ==
Born near Memphis, Tennessee, Walker attended the public schools and the boys' college at Durhamville, Tennessee.

== Career ==
He was employed in early youth as a clerk in a country store. He moved to Missouri in 1867 and settled near Kennett, Dunklin County. He engaged in agricultural pursuits. He moved to Point Pleasant, New Madrid County in 1871 and engaged in transportation on the Mississippi River. He engaged in the dry-goods business at Dexter, Missouri, in 1876, and later, in 1882, in the buying and selling of grain. He served as delegate to the Democratic National Convention in 1880. He was an unsuccessful candidate for the Democratic nomination for Congress in 1884.

Walker was elected as a Democrat to the fiftieth and fifty-first Congresses and served from March 4, 1887, until his death. He was unanimously nominated as the Democratic candidate for reelection to the fifty-second Congress on the day of his death.

== Death ==
He died July 19, 1890, in Dexter, Missouri from an influenza epidemic that had hit the area. He was interred in Dexter Cemetery.

== See also ==
- List of members of the United States Congress who died in office (1790–1899)

U.S. House of Representatives
| Preceded by William Dawson | Member of the U.S. House of Representatives from Missouri's 14th congressional district 1887-1890 | Succeeded by Robert Henry Whitelaw |
