= William T. Tyndall =

American politician

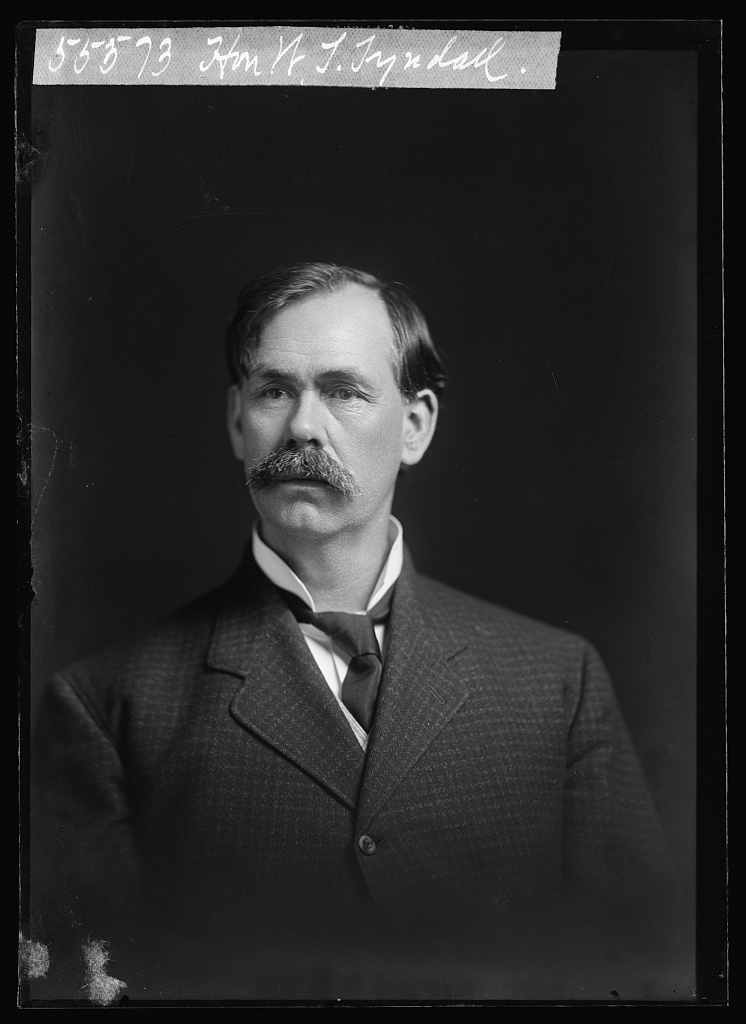
- William T. Tyndall photographed by C. M. Bell Studio

Member of the U.S. House of Representatives from Missouri's 14th district
- In office March 4, 1905 – March 3, 1907
- Preceded by: Willard D. Vandiver
- Succeeded by: Joseph J. Russell

Personal details
- Born: January 16, 1862 Sparta, Missouri, U.S.
- Died: November 26, 1928 (aged 66) Bartlesville, Oklahoma, U.S.
- Party: Republican

William Thomas Tyndall (January 16, 1862 – November 26, 1928) was a U.S. representative from Missouri's 14th congressional district.

Born in Sparta, Missouri, Tyndall attended the public schools, Henderson Academy at Sparta, and Sparta Academy. He engaged in teaching at Sparta in 1884–1895. He studied law. He was admitted to the bar in 1893 and commenced practice in Sparta. He was appointed postmaster of Sparta, Missouri, by President Harrison and served from March 23, 1891, to November 14, 1893. He was again appointed postmaster by President McKinley, and served from December 8, 1897, to January 7, 1905.

Tyndall was elected as a Republican to the Fifty-ninth Congress (March 4, 1905 – March 3, 1907). He was an unsuccessful candidate for reelection in 1906 to the Sixtieth Congress. He resumed the practice of law in Sparta, Missouri. He moved to Bartlesville, Oklahoma, in 1912 and continued the practice of law until his death there November 26, 1928. He was interred in a mausoleum in White Rose Cemetery.

U.S. House of Representatives
Preceded by Willard D. Vandiver	Member of the U.S. House of Representatives from Missouri's 14th congressional district 1905–1907	Succeeded by Joseph J. Russell
