= 1892 United States House of Representatives elections =

House elections for the 53rd U.S. Congress

- November 8, 1892 (Note: Three states held early elections between June 6 and September 12, and Rhode Island had a late run-off election April 5, 1893.)

All 356 seats in the United States House of Representatives 179 seats needed for a majority
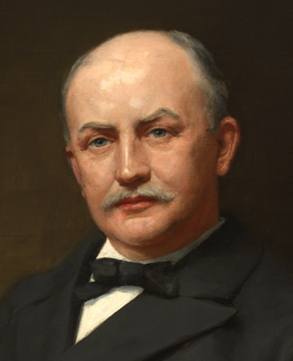

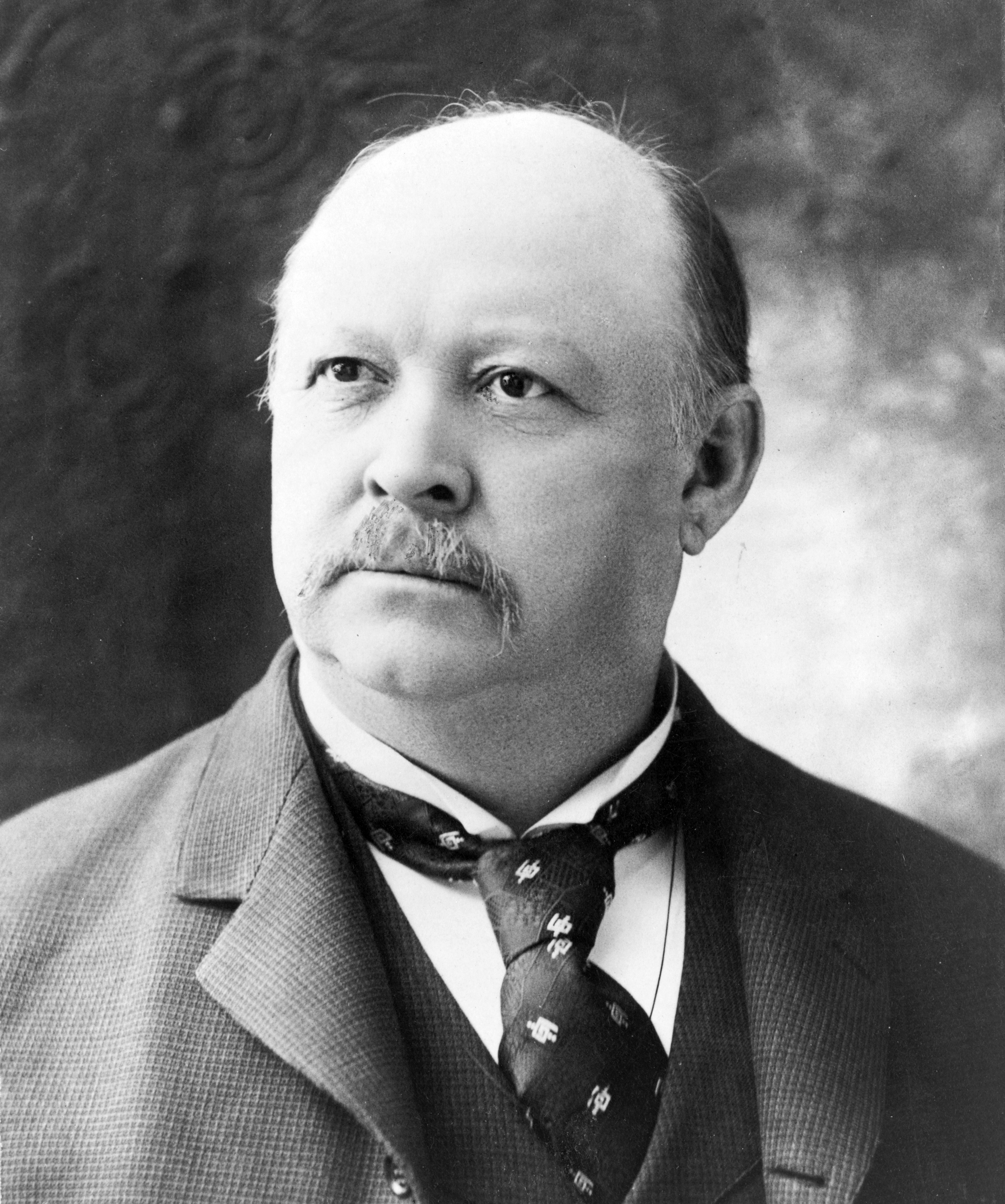

	Majority party	Minority party	Third party
Leader	Charles F. Crisp	Thomas Brackett Reed
Party	Democratic	Republican	Populist
Leader's seat	Georgia 3rd	Maine 1st
Last election	238 seats	86 seats	8 seats
Seats won	218 (Note: Dubin (p. 303) records 214 Democrats, 2 Independent Democrats, 127 Republicans, 11 Populists, and 1 Silver at the opening of the 53rd Congress, before several contested elections overturned a few results.)	124	11
Seat change	▼20	▲38	▲3
Popular vote	5,603,431	4,827,462	980,033
Percentage	47.38%	40.82%	8.29%
Swing	▼3.33pp	▼1.98pp	▲6.42pp
	Fourth party	Fifth party
Party	Silver	Independent
Last election	Pre-creation	0 seats
Seats won	1	2 (Note: Includes 2 Independent Democrats: Michael J. McEttrick elected in Massachusetts's 10th congressional district, and William McAleer elected in Pennsylvania's 3rd congressional district.)
Seat change	▲1	▲2
Popular vote	7,171	95,631
Percentage	0.06%	0.81%
Swing	New party
- Results: Democratic gain Republican gain Democratic hold Republican hold Populist gain Populist hold Silver gain
Speaker before election
Charles Frederick Crisp
Democratic
Elected Speaker
Charles Frederick Crisp
Democratic

The 1892 United States House of Representatives elections were held for the most part on November 8, 1892, with Oregon, Maine, and Vermont holding theirs early in either June or September. They coincided with the election of Grover Cleveland as president for the second, noncontinuous time, defeating incumbent Benjamin Harrison. Elections were held for 356 seats of the United States House of Representatives, representing 44 states, to serve in the 53rd United States Congress. They were the first elections after the reapportionment following the 1890 United States census, which increased the size of the House. Special elections were also held throughout the year.

Despite the presidential results, Harrison's Republican Party regained some of the seats lost in 1890 to the Democratic Party, but was still in the minority. The Republican pickups were the result of several Republican-friendly Northern districts reverting to form after voting Democratic in the previous election cycle. The third-party Populists, who enjoyed strong support among farmers and laborers in the Southern United States and the Western United States, also won three additional seats.

== Election summaries ==
This was the first election after reapportionment following the 1890 census. Twenty-four new seats were added, with 13 States gaining one seat each, two States gaining 2 seats each, and one state gaining 3 seats, and the remaining 28 states having no change. Several states did not redistrict following the apportionment of extra seats and elected those new seats at-large.

↓
218	3	11	124
Democratic	(Note: There were 2 Independent Democrats and 1 Silver Party member.)	P	Republican

State	Type	Total seats		Democratic		Republican		Populist	
State	Type	Seats	Change	Seats	Change	Seats	Change	Seats	Change
Alabama	District	9	▲1	9	▲1	0	Steady	0	Steady
Arkansas	District	6	▲1	6	▲1	0	Steady	0	Steady
California	District	7	▲1	4	▲2	2	▼2	1	▲1
Colorado	District	2	▲1	0	Steady	0	▼1	2	▲2
Connecticut	District	4	Steady	3	Steady	1	Steady	0	Steady
Delaware	At-large	1	Steady	1	Steady	0	Steady	0	Steady
Florida	District	2	Steady	2	Steady	0	Steady	0	Steady
Georgia	District	11	▲1	11	▲2	0	Steady	0	Steady
Idaho	At-large	1	Steady	0	Steady	1	Steady	0	Steady
Illinois	District +2 at-large	22	▲2	11	▼3	11	▲5	0	Steady
Indiana	District	13	Steady	11	Steady	2	Steady	0	Steady
Iowa	District	11	Steady	1	▼5	10	▲5	0	Steady
Kansas	District +at-large	8	▲1	1	▲1	2	Steady	5	Steady
Kentucky	District	11	Steady	10	Steady	1	Steady	0	Steady
Louisiana	District	6	Steady	6	Steady	0	Steady	0	Steady
Maine	District	4	Steady	0	Steady	4	Steady	0	Steady
Maryland	District	6	Steady	6	Steady	0	Steady	0	Steady
Massachusetts	District	13	▲1	3 (Note: Includes 1 Independent Democrat.)	▼4	10	▲5	0	Steady
Michigan	District	12	▲1	5	▼2	7	▲3	0	Steady
Minnesota	District	7	▲2	2	▼1	4	▲3	1	Steady
Mississippi	District	7	Steady	7	Steady	0	Steady	0	Steady
Missouri	District	15	▲1	14	Steady	1	▲1	0	Steady
Montana	At-large	1	Steady	0	▼1	1	▲1	0	Steady
Nebraska	District	6	▲3	1	Steady	3	▲3	2	Steady
Nevada	At-large	1 (Note: Nevada elected Francis G. Newlands, a member of the Silver Party.)	Steady	0	Steady	0	▼1	0	Steady
New Hampshire	District	2	Steady	0	▼2	2	▲2	0	Steady
New Jersey	District	8	▲1	6	▲1	2	Steady	0	Steady
New York	District	34	Steady	20	▼3	14	▲3	0	Steady
North Carolina	District	9	Steady	8	Steady	1	Steady	0	Steady
North Dakota	At-large	1	Steady	0	Steady	1	Steady	0	Steady
Ohio	District	21	Steady	11	▼3	10	▲3	0	Steady
Oregon	District	2	▲1	0	Steady	2	▲1	0	Steady
Pennsylvania	District +2 at-large	30	▲2	10	Steady	20	▲2	0	Steady
Rhode Island	District	2	Steady	2	Steady	0	Steady	0	Steady
South Carolina	District	7	Steady	6	▼1	1	▲1	0	Steady
South Dakota	At-large	2	Steady	0	Steady	2	Steady	0	Steady
Tennessee	District	10	Steady	8	Steady	2	Steady	0	Steady
Texas	District	13	▲2	13	▲2	0	Steady	0	Steady
Vermont	District	2	Steady	0	Steady	2	Steady	0	Steady
Virginia	District	10	Steady	10	Steady	0	Steady	0	Steady
Washington	At-large	2	▲1	0	Steady	2	▲1	0	Steady
West Virginia	District	4	Steady	4	Steady	0	Steady	0	Steady
Wisconsin	District	10	▲1	6	▼2	4	▲3	0	Steady
Wyoming	At-large	1	Steady	1	▲1	0	▼1	0	Steady
Total		356	▲24	220; 61.8%	▼23	124; 34.83%	▲45	11; 3.1%	▲3

Popular vote
Democratic	47.38%
Republican	40.82%
Populist	8.29%
Silver	0.06%
Independent	0.81%
Others	2.64%

House seats
Democratic	61.24%
Republican	34.83%
Populist	3.09%
Silver	0.28%
Independent	0.56%

The 1890 election saw the election of eight Populists, but no other third-party or independent members.

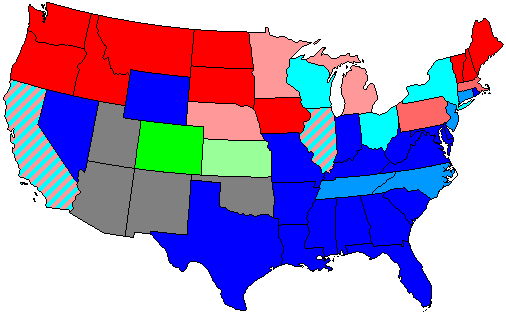
House seats by party holding plurality in state: 80+% Democratic / 80+% Populist / 80+% Republican; 60+% to 80% Democratic / 60+% to 80% Populist / 60+% to 80% Republican; Up to 60% Democratic / / Up to 60% Republican

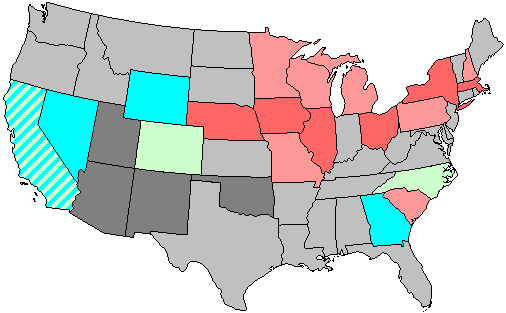
Net gain in party representation: 6+ Democratic gain / / 6+ Republican gain; 3–5 Democratic gain / / 3–5 Republican gain; 1–2 Democratic gain / 1–2 Populist gain / 1–2 Republican gain; no net change

== Early election dates ==
In 1892, three states, with 8 seats among them, held elections early:

- June 6 Oregon
- September 6 Vermont
- September 12 Maine

== Alabama ==
One new seat was added in reapportionment. Democrats gained a seat in the new district.

District	Incumbent			This race	
District	Member	Party	First elected	Results	Candidates
Alabama 1	Richard H. Clarke	Democratic	1888	Incumbent re-elected.	▌ ✓ Richard H. Clarke (Democratic) 60.50%; ▌William Mason (Populist) 34.60%; ▌Frank H. Threatt (Republican) 4.91%
Alabama 2	Hilary A. Herbert	Democratic	1876	Incumbent retired. Democratic hold.	▌ ✓ Jesse F. Stallings (Democratic) 58.82%; ▌Frank Baaltzell (Populist) 38.18%; ▌John D. Bibb (Republican) 3.00%
Alabama 3	William C. Oates	Democratic	1880	Incumbent re-elected.	▌ ✓ William C. Oates (Democratic) 62.38%; ▌J. F. Tate (Populist) 36.69%; ▌A. W. Harvey (Republican) 0.93%
Alabama 4	None (new district)			New seat. Democratic gain.	▌ ✓ Gaston A. Robbins (Democratic) 60.66%; ▌Adolphus P. Longshore (Populist) 32.03%; ▌George Henry Craig (Republican) 7.31%
Alabama 5	James E. Cobb	Democratic	1886	Incumbent re-elected.	▌ ✓ James E. Cobb (Democratic) 49.31%; ▌M. W. Whatley (Populist) 42.24%; ▌J. V. McDuffie (Republican) 8.45%
Alabama 6	John H. Bankhead	Democratic	1886	Incumbent re-elected.	▌ ✓ John H. Bankhead (Democratic) 62.77%; ▌T. M. Barbour (Populist) 28.24%; ▌Ignatius Green (Republican) 8.99%
Alabama 7	William H. Forney	Democratic	1876	Incumbent retired. Democratic hold.	▌ ✓ William H. Denson (Democratic) 54.30%; ▌William Wood (Populist) 45.22%; ▌J. T. Blakemore (Republican) 0.49%
Alabama 8	Joseph Wheeler	Democratic	1884	Incumbent re-elected.	▌ ✓ Joseph Wheeler (Democratic) 52.45%; ▌R. W. Austin (Populist) 39.89%; ▌R. T. Blackwell (Republican) 7.66%
Alabama 9	Louis W. Turpin; Redistricted from the 4th district	Democratic	1890	Incumbent re-elected.	▌ ✓ Louis W. Turpin (Democratic) 66.97%; ▌Henry Persons (Populist) 30.89%; Others: ▌George Baggott (Republican) 1.56%; ▌J. B. Ware (Unknown) 0.35%; ▌B. M. Brazealle (Unknown) 0.24%

== Arkansas ==
One new seat was added in reapportionment. Democrats gained a seat in the new district.

District	Incumbent			This race	
District	Member	Party	First elected	Results	Candidates
Arkansas 1	William H. Cate	Democratic	1890	Incumbent retired. Democratic hold.	▌ ✓ Philip D. McCulloch Jr. (Democratic) 63.61%; ▌Jacob Trieber (Republican) 36.39%
Arkansas 2	Clifton R. Breckinridge	Democratic	1882	Incumbent re-elected.	▌ ✓ Clifton R. Breckinridge (Democratic) 70.80%; ▌W. B. Heartsill (Populist) 29.20%
Arkansas 3	Thomas C. McRae	Democratic	1885	Incumbent re-elected.	▌ ✓ Thomas C. McRae (Democratic) 68.09%; ▌J. O. Bush (Populist) 31.91%
Arkansas 4	William L. Terry	Democratic	1890	Incumbent re-elected.	▌ ✓ William L. Terry (Democratic) 69.75%; ▌T. M. Birmingham (Republican) 30.25%
Arkansas 5	Samuel W. Peel	Democratic	1884	Incumbent retired. Democratic hold.	▌ ✓ Hugh A. Dinsmore (Democratic) 57.16%; ▌J. E. Bryan (Populist) 42.84%
Arkansas 6	None (new district)			New seat. Democratic gain.	▌ ✓ Robert Neill (Democratic) 87.64%; ▌George Martin (Populist) 10.17%; Scattering 2.19%

== California ==
One new seat was added in reapportionment. Democrats gained one seat from the Republicans, and the Populists gained a seat in the new district.

District	Incumbent			This race	
District	Member	Party	First elected	Results	Candidates
California 1	Thomas J. Geary	Democratic	1890	Incumbent re-elected.	▌ ✓ Thomas J. Geary (Democratic) 56.8%; ▌Edward W. Davis (Republican) 38.6%; ▌Charles C. Swafford (Populist) 4.6%
California 2	Anthony Caminetti	Democratic	1890	Incumbent re-elected.	▌ ✓ Anthony Caminetti (Democratic) 53.2%; ▌John F. Davis (Republican) 43.1%; ▌Chauncey H. Dunn (Prohibition) 3.4%; ▌J. H. White (Independent) 0.3%
California 3	Joseph McKenna	Republican	1884	Incumbent resigned March 28, 1892. Republican hold.	▌ ✓ Samuel G. Hilborn (Republican) 43.2%; ▌Warren B. English (Democratic) 43.1%; ▌J. L. Lyon (Populist) 11.5%; ▌L. B. Scranton (Prohibition) 2.2%
California 4	John T. Cutting	Republican	1890	Incumbent retired. Democratic gain.	▌ ✓ James G. Maguire (Democratic) 49.2%; ▌Charles O. Alexander (Republican) 43.4%; ▌Edgar P. Burman (Populist) 6.5%; ▌Henry Collins (Prohibition) 1.0%
California 5	Eugene F. Loud	Republican	1890	Incumbent re-elected.	▌ ✓ Eugene F. Loud (Republican) 46.4%; ▌J. W. Ryland (Democratic) 43.3%; ▌Jonas J. Morrison (Populist) 7.9%; ▌William Kelly (Prohibition) 2.4%
California 6	None (new district)			New seat. Populist gain.	▌ ✓ Marion Cannon (Populist) 56.3%; ▌Hervey Lindley (Republican) 38.8%; ▌O. R. Dougherty (Prohibition) 4.9%
California 7	William W. Bowers; Redistricted from the 6th district	Republican	1890	Incumbent re-elected.	▌ ✓ William W. Bowers (Republican) 41.6%; ▌Olin Welborn (Democratic) 39.0%; ▌Hiram Hamilton (Populist) 14.6%; ▌M. B. Harris (Prohibition) 4.8%

== Colorado ==
One new seat was added in reapportionment. Populists had a net gain of two seats, one taken from the Republicans and the other from a new district.

District	Incumbent			This race	
District	Member	Party	First elected	Results	Candidates
Colorado 1	None (new district)			New seat. Populist gain.	▌ ✓ Lafe Pence (Populist) 49.12%; ▌Earl B. Coe (Republican) 43.24%; ▌John G. Taylor (Democratic) 5.50%; ▌W. G. Sprague (Prohibition) 2.15%
Colorado 2	Hosea Townsend; Redistricted from the at-large district	Republican	1888	Incumbent lost renomination. Populist gain.	▌ ✓ John Calhoun Bell (Populist) 60.98%; ▌Henderson Eddy (Republican) 37.78%; ▌Isaac J. Keator (Prohibition) 3.36%

== Connecticut ==
District	Incumbent			This race	
District	Member	Party	First elected	Results	Candidates
Connecticut 1	Lewis Sperry	Democratic	1890	Incumbent re-elected.	▌ ✓ Lewis Sperry (Democratic) 49.0%; ▌E. Stevens Henry (Republican) 47.5%; ▌James Morrison (Prohibition) 2.6%; Others: ▌George W. Gowdy (Populist) 0.6%; ▌August Kellmer (Socialist Labor) 0.3%
Connecticut 2	Washington F. Willcox	Democratic	1888	Incumbent retired. Democratic hold.	▌ ✓ James P. Pigott (Democratic) 51.0%; ▌Stephen Kellogg (Republican) 45.7%; ▌Lyman H. Squires (Prohibition) 2.2%; Others: ▌Alfred S. Houghton (Populist) 0.8%; ▌Albert Gogler (Socialist Labor) 0.3%
Connecticut 3	Charles A. Russell	Republican	1886	Incumbent re-elected.	▌ ✓ Charles A. Russell (Republican) 49.5%; ▌Charles Frederick Thayer (Democratic) 46.8%; ▌Herbert J. Crocker (Prohibition) 3.5%; ▌John A. Butler (Socialist Labor) 0.2%
Connecticut 4	Robert E. De Forest	Democratic	1890	Incumbent re-elected.	▌ ✓ Robert E. De Forest (Democratic) 51.4%; ▌Frederick Miles (Republican) 46.7%; ▌William R. Miles (Prohibition) 1.9%

== Delaware ==
District	Incumbent			This race	
District	Member	Party	First elected	Results	Candidates
Delaware at-large	John W. Causey	Democratic	1890	Incumbent re-elected.	▌ ✓ John W. Causey (Democratic) 49.95%; ▌Jonathan S. Willis (Republican) 48.68%; ▌Lewis M. Price (Prohibition) 1.37%

== Georgia ==
District	Incumbent			This race	
District	Member	Party	First elected	Results	Candidates
Georgia 1	Rufus E. Lester	Democratic	1888	Incumbent re-elected.	▌ ✓ Rufus E. Lester (Democratic) 62.71%; ▌W. R. Kemp (Populist) 19.65%; ▌L. M. Pleasant (Republican) 17.64%
Georgia 2	None (new district)			New seat. Democratic gain.	▌ ✓ Benjamin E. Russell (Democratic) 65.16%; ▌J. H. Hand (Populist) 34.29%; ▌Gabe Davidson (Republican) 0.55%
Georgia 3	Charles F. Crisp	Democratic	1882	Incumbent re-elected.	▌ ✓ Charles F. Crisp (Democratic) 69.91%; ▌F. D. Wimberly (Populist) 30.09%
Georgia 4	Charles L. Moses	Democratic	1890	Incumbent re-elected.	▌ ✓ Charles L. Moses (Democratic) 64.14%; ▌J. H. Turner (Populist) 35.86%
Georgia 5	Leonidas F. Livingston	Democratic	1890	Incumbent re-elected.	▌ ✓ Leonidas F. Livingston (Democratic) 60.06%; ▌Samuel W. Small (Populist) 39.79%; ▌Sam Taliaferro (Independent) Populist 0.15%
Georgia 6	James Henderson Blount	Democratic	1872	Incumbent retired. Democratic hold.	▌ ✓ Thomas Banks Cabaniss (Democratic) 64.55%; ▌C. F. Turner (Populist) 35.45%
Georgia 7	Robert W. Everett	Democratic	1890	Incumbent retired. Democratic hold.	▌ ✓ John W. Maddox (Democratic) 65.86%; ▌John A. Sibley (Populist) 34.15%
Georgia 8	Thomas G. Lawson	Democratic	1890	Incumbent re-elected.	▌ ✓ Thomas G. Lawson (Democratic) 66.73%; ▌James B. Robins (Populist) 33.27%
Georgia 9	Thomas E. Winn	Democratic	1890	Incumbent retired. Democratic hold.	▌ ✓ Farish Tate (Democratic) 59.54%; ▌Thaddeus Pickett (Populist) 40.46%
Georgia 10	Thomas E. Watson	Democratic	1890	Incumbent lost re-election as a Populist. Democratic hold.	▌ ✓ James C. C. Black (Democratic) 59.04%; ▌Thomas E. Watson (Populist) 40.96%
Georgia 11	Henry G. Turner; Redistricted from the 2nd district	Democratic	1880	Incumbent re-elected.	▌ ✓ Henry G. Turner (Democratic) 64.38%; ▌Lucius C. Mattox (Populist) 35.28%; ▌F. D. Wimberly (Unknown) 0.34%

== Idaho ==
District	Incumbent			This race	
District	Member	Party	First elected	Results	Candidates
Idaho at-large	Willis Sweet	Republican	1890	Incumbent re-elected.	▌ ✓ Willis Sweet (Republican) 44.14%; ▌Edward B. True (Democratic) 31.13%; ▌James Gunn (Populist) 23.58%; ▌Eugene R. Hadley (Prohibition) 1.15%

== Illinois ==
District	Incumbent			This race	
District	Member	Party	First elected	Results	Candidates
Illinois at-large 2 seats	None (new seat)			New seat. Democratic gain.	▌ ✓ John C. Black (Democratic) 24.41%; ▌ ✓ Andrew J. Hunter (Democratic) 24.33%; ▌Richard Yates Jr. (Republican) 22.92%; ▌George S. Willits (Republican) 22.91%; Others: ▌Francis E. Andrews (Prohibition) 1.49%; ▌James S. Felter (Prohibition) 1.48%; ▌Jesse Harper (Populist) 1.24%; ▌Michael McDonough (Populist) 1.23%
Illinois at-large 2 seats	None (new seat)			New seat. Democratic gain.	▌ ✓ John C. Black (Democratic) 24.41%; ▌ ✓ Andrew J. Hunter (Democratic) 24.33%; ▌Richard Yates Jr. (Republican) 22.92%; ▌George S. Willits (Republican) 22.91%; Others: ▌Francis E. Andrews (Prohibition) 1.49%; ▌James S. Felter (Prohibition) 1.48%; ▌Jesse Harper (Populist) 1.24%; ▌Michael McDonough (Populist) 1.23%
Illinois 1	Abner Taylor	Republican	1888	Incumbent retired. Republican hold.	▌ ✓ J. Frank Aldrich (Republican) 49.68%; ▌Edwin B. Smith (Democratic) 47.40%; ▌Winfield S. McComas (Prohibition) 2.17%; Others: ▌Alfred Clark (Populist) 0.71%; ▌P. J. Weldon (CCRL) 0.04%
Illinois 2	Lawrence E. McGann	Democratic	1890	Incumbent re-elected.	▌ ✓ Lawrence E. McGann (Democratic) 68.90%; ▌Edward D. Connor (Republican) 29.94%; Others: ▌Andrew J. Wicklund (Prohibition) 1.02%; ▌James Teel (CCRL) 0.15%
Illinois 3	Allan C. Durborow Jr.	Democratic	1890	Incumbent re-elected.	▌ ✓ Allan C. Durborow Jr. (Democratic) 57.42%; ▌Thomas C. MacMillan (Republican) 40.70%; Others: ▌Joseph E. Young (Prohibition) 1.17%; ▌Charles W. Russell (Populist) 0.58%; ▌Henry Steinbock (CCRL) 0.14%
Illinois 4	Walter C. Newberry	Democratic	1890	Incumbent retired. Democratic hold.	▌ ✓ Julius Goldzier (Democratic) 52.19%; ▌William Vocke (Republican) 45.22%; ▌L. D. Rogers (Prohibition) 1.91%; Others: ▌William E. McNally (Populist) 0.64%; ▌Frank Scanlan (CCRL) 0.05%
Illinois 5	Albert J. Hopkins	Republican	1885	Incumbent re-elected.	▌ ✓ Albert J. Hopkins (Republican) 58.06%; ▌Samuel Alschuler (Democratic) 36.50%; ▌Henry Wood (Prohibition) 5.44%
Illinois 6	Robert R. Hitt	Republican	1882	Incumbent re-elected.	▌ ✓ Robert R. Hitt (Republican) 54.92%; ▌Henry D. Dennis (Democratic) 38.38%; ▌Russel J. Hazlett (Prohibition) 4.52%; ▌Stephen H. Bashor (Populist) 2.18%
Illinois 7	Thomas J. Henderson	Republican	1874	Incumbent re-elected.	▌ ✓ Thomas J. Henderson (Republican) 52.10%; ▌James E. McPherran (Democratic) 37.31%; ▌Horace M. Gilbert (Populist) 6.46%; ▌Jacob H. Hoofstitler (Prohibition) 4.13%
Illinois 8	Lewis Steward	Democratic	1890	Incumbent lost re-election. Republican gain.	▌ ✓ Robert A. Childs (Republican) 48.23%; ▌Lewis Steward (Democratic) 48.19%; ▌Norman Kilburn (Prohibition) 3.59%
Illinois 9	Herman W. Snow	Democratic	1890	Incumbent lost re-election. Republican gain.	▌ ✓ Hamilton K. Wheeler (Republican) 48.17%; ▌Herman W. Snow (Democratic) 46.70%; ▌E. E. Day (Prohibition) 4.09%; ▌Norman H. Scriven (Populist) 1.04%
Illinois 10	Philip S. Post	Republican	1886	Incumbent re-elected.	▌ ✓ Philip S. Post (Republican) 49.66%; ▌James W. Hunter (Democratic) 44.57%; ▌William T. Walliker (Populist) 3.09%; ▌Albert D. Metcalf (Prohibition) 2.69%
Illinois 11	Benjamin T. Cable	Democratic	1890	Incumbent retired. Republican gain.	▌ ✓ Benjamin F. Marsh (Republican) 47.95%; ▌Truman Plantz (Democratic) 45.37%; ▌William P. White (Prohibition) 3.87%; ▌Martin W. Greer (Populist) 2.81%
Illinois 12	Scott Wike	Democratic	1888	Incumbent lost renomination. Democratic hold.	▌ ✓ John James McDannold (Democratic) 53.07%; ▌T. M. Rogers (Republican) 38.10%; ▌William Hess (Populist) 5.95%; ▌William H. Dean (Prohibition) 2.89%
Illinois 13	William McKendree Springer	Democratic	1874	Incumbent re-elected.	▌ ✓ William McKendree Springer (Democratic) 52.14%; ▌Charles P. Kane (Republican) 41.43%; ▌Andrew H. Harnly (Prohibition) 4.16%; ▌Henry M. Miller (Populist) 2.28%
Illinois 14	Owen Scott	Democratic	1890	Incumbent lost re-election. Republican gain.	▌ ✓ Benjamin F. Funk (Republican) 48.02%; ▌Owen Scott (Democratic) 47.21%; ▌Erastus B. Cake (Prohibition) 4.78%
Illinois 15	Samuel T. Busey	Democratic	1890	Incumbent lost re-election. Republican gain.	▌ ✓ Joseph Gurney Cannon (Republican) 49.63%; ▌Samuel T. Busey (Democratic) 46.02%; ▌John T. Buckner (Prohibition) 3.01%; ▌Allen Varner (Populist) 1.35%
Illinois 16	George W. Fithian	Democratic	1888	Incumbent re-elected.	▌ ✓ George W. Fithian (Democratic) 46.01%; ▌J. O. Burton (Republican) 43.94%; ▌Thomas Ratcliff (Populist) 7.42%; ▌Hale Johnson (Prohibition) 2.64%
Illinois 17	Edward Lane	Democratic	1886	Incumbent re-elected.	▌ ✓ Edward Lane (Democratic) 51.90%; ▌John N. Gwin (Republican) 37.24%; ▌Persley G. Donaldson (Populist) 6.94%; ▌Harry P. Ripley (Prohibition) 3.92%
Illinois 18	William S. Forman	Democratic	1888	Incumbent re-elected.	▌ ✓ William S. Forman (Democratic) 49.19%; ▌William Northcott (Republican) 46.01%; ▌J. B. Poirot (Populist) 2.69%; ▌David G. Ray (Prohibition) 2.11%
Illinois 19	James R. Williams	Democratic	1888	Incumbent re-elected.	▌ ✓ James R. Williams (Democratic) 49.82%; ▌Norman H. Moss (Republican) 40.51%; ▌Joseph H. Crasno (Populist) 7.03%; ▌J. D. Hooker (Prohibition) 2.63%
Illinois 20	George Washington Smith	Republican	1888	Incumbent re-elected.	▌ ✓ George Washington Smith (Republican) 51.67%; ▌Benjamin W. Pope (Democratic) 45.20%; ▌William R. Lee (Prohibition) 2.51%; ▌Thomas J. Cross (Populist) 0.62%

== Indiana ==
District	Incumbent			This race	
District	Member	Party	First elected	Results	Candidates
Indiana 1	William F. Parrett	Democratic	1888	Incumbent retired. Democratic hold.	▌ ✓ Arthur H. Taylor (Democratic) 47.38%; ▌A. P. Twineham (Republican) 46.29%; ▌Moses Smith (Populist) 5.07%; ▌J. D. Cockrum (Prohibition) 1.27%
Indiana 2	John L. Bretz	Democratic	1890	Incumbent re-elected.	▌ ✓ John L. Bretz (Democratic) 47.93%; ▌Ben L. Willoughby (Republican) 42.60%; ▌Merrick W. Ackerly (Populist) 8.15%; ▌L. L. Cooper (Prohibition) 1.31%
Indiana 3	Jason B. Brown	Democratic	1888	Incumbent re-elected.	▌ ✓ Jason B. Brown (Democratic) 51.59%; ▌William W. Borden (Republican) 44.26%; ▌L. C. Adams (Populist) 3.19%; ▌H. C. Jackson (Prohibition) 0.96%
Indiana 4	William S. Holman	Democratic	1880	Incumbent re-elected.	▌ ✓ William S. Holman (Democratic) 52.50%; ▌Samuel M. Jones (Republican) 44.26%; ▌A. L. Crim (Prohibition) 2.18%; ▌William B. Mobler (Populist) 1.33%
Indiana 5	George W. Cooper	Democratic	1888	Incumbent re-elected.	▌ ✓ George W. Cooper (Democratic) 48.27%; ▌John Worrell (Republican) 45.39%; ▌L. A. Stockwell (Populist) 3.19%; ▌S. M. McNaughton (Prohibition) 2.43%
Indiana 6	Henry U. Johnson	Republican	1890	Incumbent re-elected.	▌ ✓ Henry U. Johnson (Republican) 56.67%; ▌Luther M. Mering (Democratic) 32.76%; ▌Nathan T. Butts (Populist) 7.15%; ▌W. A. Spurgeon (Prohibition) 3.41%
Indiana 7	William D. Bynum	Democratic	1884	Incumbent re-elected.	▌ ✓ William D. Bynum (Democratic) 49.52%; ▌Charles L. Henry (Republican) 47.21%; ▌Samuel Walker (Populist) 1.79%; ▌Charles E. Boston (Prohibition) 1.48%
Indiana 8	Elijah V. Brookshire	Democratic	1888	Incumbent re-elected.	▌ ✓ Elijah V. Brookshire (Democratic) 48.39%; ▌Winfield S. Carpenter (Republican) 44.97%; ▌Jonathan T. Phillips (Populist) 4.90%; ▌Jonathan L. Shields (Prohibition) 1.75%
Indiana 9	Daniel W. Waugh	Republican	1890	Incumbent re-elected.	▌ ✓ Daniel W. Waugh (Republican) 50.11%; ▌Eli W. Brown (Democratic) 41.29%; ▌George W. Swan (Populist) 5.39%; ▌George W. Bouer (Prohibition) 3.21%
Indiana 10	David Henry Patton	Democratic	1890	Incumbent retired. Democratic hold.	▌ ✓ Thomas Hammond (Democratic) 46.10%; ▌William Johnston (Republican) 45.99%; ▌D. H. Yeoman (Populist) 4.91%; ▌W. O. Hennegar (Prohibition) 3.01%
Indiana 11	Augustus N. Martin	Democratic	1888	Incumbent re-elected.	▌ ✓ Augustus N. Martin (Democratic) 45.86%; ▌William T. Daley (Republican) 42.34%; ▌Joshua Strange (Populist) 6.34%; ▌Sumner W. Haynes (Prohibition) 3.70%
Indiana 12	Charles A. O. McClellan	Democratic	1888	Incumbent retired. Democratic hold.	▌ ✓ William F. McNagny (Democratic) 50.00%; ▌Adolph J. You (Republican) 42.34%; ▌Calvin Husselman (Populist) 5.07%; ▌Charles Eckhart (Prohibition) 2.59%
Indiana 13	Benjamin F. Shively	Democratic	1886	Incumbent retired. Democratic hold.	▌ ✓ Charles G. Conn (Democratic) 50.00%; ▌James S. Dodge (Republican) 45.90%; ▌George S. Howard (Prohibition) 2.44%; ▌Amos N. Somers (Populist) 1.25%

== Iowa ==
District	Incumbent			This race	
District	Member	Party	First elected	Results	Candidates
Iowa 1	John J. Seerley	Democratic	1888	Incumbent lost re-election. Republican gain.	▌ ✓ John H. Gear (Republican) 49.38%; ▌John J. Seerley (Democratic) 47.69%; ▌T. J. Slater (Populist) 1.85%; ▌L. B. Glasgow (Prohibition) 1.08%
Iowa 2	Walter I. Hayes	Democratic	1886	Incumbent re-elected.	▌ ✓ Walter I. Hayes (Democratic) 58.86%; ▌John H. Munroe (Republican) 39.08%; Others: ▌Charles Dalton (Populist) 1.42%; ▌S. A. Gilley (Prohibition) 0.65%
Iowa 3	David B. Henderson	Republican	1882	Incumbent re-elected.	▌ ✓ David B. Henderson (Republican) 51.31%; ▌James H. Shields (Democratic) 47.91%; ▌Lindsey Jessup (Prohibition) 0.78%
Iowa 4	Walter H. Butler	Democratic	1890	Incumbent lost re-election. Republican gain.	▌ ✓ Thomas Updegraff (Republican) 51.52%; ▌Walter H. Butler (Democratic) 47.36%; ▌Jacob W. Rogers (Prohibition) 1.12%
Iowa 5	John Taylor Hamilton	Democratic	1890	Incumbent lost re-election. Republican gain.	▌ ✓ Robert G. Cousins (Republican) 49.92%; ▌John Taylor Hamilton (Democratic) 47.18%; Others: ▌Thomas E. Mann (Populist) 1.59%; ▌J. J. Milne (Prohibition) 1.32%
Iowa 6	Frederick Edward White	Democratic	1890	Incumbent lost re-election. Republican gain.	▌ ✓ John F. Lacey (Republican) 47.13%; ▌Frederick Edward White (Democratic) 44.01%; ▌E. S. Owens (Populist) 7.67%; ▌J. C. Reece (Prohibition) 1.19%
Iowa 7	John A. T. Hull	Republican	1890	Incumbent re-elected.	▌ ✓ John A. T. Hull (Republican) 53.98%; ▌Joseph A. Dyer (Democratic) 37.54%; ▌Ed A. Ott (Populist) 6.93%; Others: ▌D. M. Haggard (Prohibition) 1.48%; ▌Daniel Braxton Turney (Ind. People's Union) 0.08%
Iowa 8	James P. Flick	Republican	1888	Incumbent retired. Republican hold.	▌ ✓ William P. Hepburn (Republican) 49.77%; ▌Thomas L. Maxwell (Democratic) 39.15%; ▌Walter S. Scott (Populist) 9.04%; ▌David Dodds (Prohibition) 2.05%
Iowa 9	Thomas Bowman	Democratic	1890	Incumbent retired. Republican gain.	▌ ✓ Alva L. Hager (Republican) 49.34%; ▌John E. McGee (Democratic) 43.32%; ▌F. W. Myers (Populist) 6.35%; ▌John Pennington (Prohibition) 0.99%
Iowa 10	Jonathan P. Dolliver	Republican	1888	Incumbent re-elected.	▌ ✓ Jonathan P. Dolliver (Republican) 53.74%; ▌J. J. Ryan (Democratic) 42.38%; ▌Jonathan E. Anderson (Populist) 3.88%
Iowa 11	George D. Perkins	Republican	1890	Incumbent re-elected.	▌ ✓ George D. Perkins (Republican) 50.56%; ▌Daniel Campbell (Democratic) 47.63%; ▌Thomas C. Griffith (Prohibition) 1.81%

== Kansas ==
District	Incumbent			This race	
District	Member	Party	First elected	Results	Candidates
Kansas at-large	None (new seat)			New seat. Populist gain.	▌ ✓ William A. Harris (Populist) 50.72%; ▌George T. Anthony (Republican) 48.00%; ▌J. M. Monroe (Prohibition) 1.28%
Kansas 1	Case Broderick	Republican	1890	Incumbent re-elected.	▌ ✓ Case Broderick (Republican) 54.47%; ▌Fred J. Close (Populist) 44.31%; Others: ▌T. J. McCormick (Prohibition) 0.78%; ▌Ed Carroll (Democratic) 0.45%
Kansas 2	Edward H. Funston	Republican	1884	Incumbent re-elected.	▌ ✓ Edward H. Funston (Republican) 49.38%; ▌Horace Ladd Moore (Democratic) 49.20%; ▌D. W. Houston (Prohibition) 1.42%
Kansas 3	Benjamin H. Clover	Populist	1890	Incumbent retired. Populist hold.	▌ ✓ Thomas Jefferson Hudson (Populist) 52.20%; ▌Lyman U. Humphrey (Republican) 46.97%; ▌M. V. Bennett (Prohibition) 0.83%
Kansas 4	John G. Otis	Populist	1890	Incumbent lost renomination. Republican gain.	▌ ✓ Charles Curtis (Republican) 52.03%; ▌E. V. Wharton (Democratic) 46.43%; ▌J. R. Silver (Prohibition) 1.54%
Kansas 5	Benjamin H. Clover	Populist	1890	Incumbent re-elected.	▌ ✓ John Davis (Populist) 50.35%; ▌Joseph R. Burton (Republican) 47.05%; Others: ▌Sidney G. Cooke (Democratic) 1.42%; ▌Horace Hurley (Prohibition) 1.18%
Kansas 6	William Baker	Populist	1890	Incumbent re-elected.	▌ ✓ William Baker (Populist) 49.85%; ▌H. L. Pestana (Republican) 45.96%; ▌Duane Freeman (Democratic) 3.34%; ▌Benjamin Brewer (Prohibition) 0.85%
Kansas 7	Jerry Simpson	Populist	1890	Incumbent re-elected.	▌ ✓ Jerry Simpson (Populist) 50.89%; ▌Chester I. Long (Republican) 48.24%; ▌W. E. Woodward (Prohibition) 0.88%

== Kentucky ==
District	Incumbent			This race	
District	Member	Party	First elected	Results	Candidates
Kentucky 1	William Johnson Stone	Democratic	1884	Incumbent re-elected.	▌ ✓ William Johnson Stone (Democratic) 53.00%; ▌William J. Deboe (Republican) 29.24%; ▌Ben C. Keys (Populist) 16.24%; ▌J. D. Smith (Prohibition) 1.52%
Kentucky 2	William T. Ellis	Democratic	1888	Incumbent re-elected.	▌ ✓ William T. Ellis (Democratic) 47.43%; ▌J. T. Kimbly (Republican) 30.82%; ▌Thomas S. Petit (Populist) 21.75%
Kentucky 3	Isaac Goodnight	Democratic	1888	Incumbent re-elected.	▌ ✓ Isaac Goodnight (Democratic) 47.15%; ▌W. Godfrey Hunter (Republican) 44.22%; ▌C. W. Biggers (Populist) 8.63%
Kentucky 4	Alexander B. Montgomery	Democratic	1886	Incumbent re-elected.	▌ ✓ Alexander B. Montgomery (Democratic) 48.06%; ▌C. M. Barnett (Republican) 34.11%; ▌M. R. Gardner (Populist) 17.84%
Kentucky 5	Asher G. Caruth	Democratic	1886	Incumbent re-elected.	▌ ✓ Asher G. Caruth (Democratic) 58.73%; ▌Augustus E. Willson (Republican) 39.55%; Others: ▌G. W. Summerfield (Prohibition) 1.07%; ▌Clarence S. Bate (Populist) 0.65%
Kentucky 6	William W. Dickerson	Democratic	1890	Incumbent lost renomination. Democratic hold.	▌ ✓ Albert S. Berry (Democratic) 60.73%; ▌Weden O'Neal (Republican) 35.11%; ▌W. B. Ogden (Prohibition) 2.45%; ▌H. M. Winslow (Populist) 1.71%
Kentucky 7	William C. P. Breckinridge	Democratic	1884	Incumbent re-elected.	▌ ✓ William C. P. Breckinridge (Democratic) 62.01%; ▌T. J. Hardin (Republican) 35.26%; ▌Lewis S. Johnstone (Populist) 2.73%
Kentucky 8	James B. McCreary	Democratic	1884	Incumbent re-elected.	▌ ✓ James B. McCreary (Democratic) 100%; Uncontested
Kentucky 9	Thomas H. Paynter	Democratic	1888	Incumbent re-elected.	▌ ✓ Thomas H. Paynter (Democratic) 53.27%; ▌John P. McCartney (Republican) 44.66%; ▌R. H. Yantis (Populist) 2.08%
Kentucky 10	Joseph M. Kendall	Democratic	1892 (special)	Incumbent retired. Democratic hold.	▌ ✓ Marcus C. Lisle (Democratic) 54.86%; ▌Charles W. Russell (Republican) 45.14%
Kentucky 11	John H. Wilson	Democratic	1888	Incumbent lost renomination. Republican hold.	▌ ✓ Silas Adams (Republican) 59.27%; ▌James R. Hindman (Democratic) 36.36%; ▌R. L. Durham (Populist) 4.37%

== Louisiana ==
One new seat was added in reapportionment. Democrats gained a seat in the new district.

District	Incumbent			This race	
District	Member	Party	First elected	Results	Candidates
Louisiana 1	Adolph Meyer	Democratic	1890	Incumbent re-elected.	▌ ✓ Adolph Meyer (Democratic) 69.21%; ▌James Wilkinson (Ind. Democratic) 30.46%; ▌Ross Carlin (Unknown) 0.33%
Louisiana 2	Matthew D. Lagan	Democratic	1890	Incumbent retired. Democratic hold.	▌ ✓ Robert C. Davey (Democratic) 67.35%; ▌Morris Marks (Populist) 32.65%
Louisiana 3	Andrew Price	Democratic	1888	Incumbent re-elected.	▌ ✓ Andrew Price (Democratic) 81.80%; ▌I. J. Willis (Populist) 18.20%
Louisiana 4	Newton C. Blanchard	Democratic	1880	Incumbent re-elected.	▌ ✓ Newton C. Blanchard (Democratic) 76.08%; ▌L. J. Guice (Populist) 23.92%
Louisiana 5	Charles J. Boatner	Democratic	1888	Incumbent re-elected.	▌ ✓ Charles J. Boatner (Democratic) 72.30%; ▌R. P. Welch (Populist-Republican) 16.05%; ▌A. A. Gundy (Ind. Democratic) 11.64%
Louisiana 6	Samuel M. Robertson	Democratic	1886	Incumbent re-elected.	▌ ✓ Samuel M. Robertson (Democratic) 85.20%; ▌J. Kleinpeter (Populist-Republican) 14.80%

== Maine ==
District	Incumbent			This race	
District	Member	Party	First elected	Results	Candidates
Maine 1	Thomas Brackett Reed	Republican	1876	Incumbent re-elected.	▌ ✓ Thomas Brackett Reed (Republican) 51.56%; ▌Darius H. Ingraham(Democratic) 46.26%; ▌Willis P. Tucker (Prohibition) 2.18%
Maine 2	Nelson Dingley Jr.	Republican	1880	Incumbent re-elected.	▌ ✓ Nelson Dingley Jr. (Republican) 52.37%; ▌Daniel J. McGillicuddy (Democratic) 41.26%; ▌Norman Wallace Lermond (Populist) 3.63%; ▌Ammi S. Ladd (Prohibition) 2.45%; ▌Gideon R. Sanford (Union Labor) 0.30%
Maine 3	Seth L. Milliken	Republican	1882	Incumbent re-elected.	▌ ✓ Seth L. Milliken (Republican) 50.34%; ▌William P. Thompson (Democratic) 44.26%; ▌George W. Gillette (Populist) 2.85%; ▌Arthur D. Knight (Prohibition) 2.55%
Maine 4	Charles A. Boutelle	Republican	1884	Incumbent re-elected.	▌ ✓ Charles A. Boutelle (Republican) 51.31%; ▌Don A. Powers (Democratic) 38.02%; ▌Samuel D. Leavitt (Ind. Democratic) 5.01%; ▌Ira G. Hersey (Prohibition) 3.96%; ▌Oliver D. Chapman (Populist) 1.71%

== Maryland ==
One new seat was added in reapportionment. Democrats gained a seat in the new district.

District	Incumbent			This race	
District	Member	Party	First elected	Results	Candidates
Maryland 1	Henry Page	Democratic	1890	Incumbent resigned September 3, 1892. Democratic hold.	▌ ✓ Robert F. Brattan (Democratic) 49.67%; ▌George M. Russum (Republican) 43.64%; ▌Daniel W. Miles (Prohibition) 5.66%; ▌E. S. Heffron (Populist) 1.03%
Maryland 2	Herman Stump	Democratic	1888	Incumbent retired. Democratic hold.	▌ ✓ J. Frederick C. Talbott (Democratic) 53.91%; ▌George Baker (Republican) 42.44%; ▌John U. Mackey (Prohibition) 3.41%; ▌Enoch Noyes (Populist) 0.24%
Maryland 3	Harry W. Rusk	Democratic	1886	Incumbent re-elected.	▌ ✓ Harry W. Rusk (Democratic) 58.35%; ▌Charles Herzog (Republican) 40.30%; ▌Robert Ireland (Prohibition) 1.35%
Maryland 4	Isidor Rayner	Democratic	1890	Incumbent re-elected.	▌ ✓ Isidor Rayner (Democratic) 58.38%; ▌Alburtus Spates (Republican) 39.85%; ▌Christian A. Spanier (Prohibition) 1.78%
Maryland 5	Barnes Compton	Democratic	1890	Incumbent re-elected.	▌ ✓ Barnes Compton (Democratic) 52.31%; ▌Thomas Parrau (Republican) 45.90%; Others: ▌Thomas J. Hood (Prohibition) 1.33%; ▌E. M. Buchard (Populist) 0.47%
Maryland 6	William McMahon McKaig	Democratic	1890	Incumbent re-elected.	▌ ✓ William McMahon McKaig (Democratic) 49.76%; ▌George L. Wellington (Republican) 48.16%; ▌Albert E. Shoemaker (Prohibition) 2.08%

== Massachusetts ==
District	Incumbent			This race	
District	Member	Party	First elected	Results	Candidates
Massachusetts 1	John Crawford Crosby; Redistricted from the 12th district	Democratic	1890	Incumbent lost re-election. Republican gain.	▌ ✓ Ashley B. Wright (Republican) 48.81%; ▌John Crawford Crosby (Democratic) 48.11%; ▌John L. Kilbon (Prohibition) 3.08%
Massachusetts 2	None (new district)			New seat. Republican gain.	▌ ✓ Frederick H. Gillett (Republican) 52.41%; ▌Edward H. Lathrop (Democratic) 44.06%; ▌Herbert M. Small (Prohibition) 3.53%
Massachusetts 3	Joseph H. Walker; Redistricted from the 10th district	Republican	1888	Incumbent re-elected.	▌ ✓ Joseph H. Walker (Republican) 50.14%; ▌John R. Thayer (Democratic) 47.03%; ▌Melvin H. Walker (Prohibition) 2.03%; ▌Erastus M. Eldridge (Populist) 0.80%
Massachusetts 4	Sherman Hoar; Redistricted from the 5th district	Democratic	1890	Incumbent retired to run for Massachusetts Attorney General. Democratic loss.	▌ ✓ Lewis D. Apsley (Republican) 53.74%; ▌Frederick S. Coolidge (Democratic) 43.30%; ▌Frank M. Forbush (Prohibition) 2.96%
Massachusetts 4	Frederick S. Coolidge; Redistricted from the 11th district	Democratic	1890	Incumbent lost re-election. Republican gain.	▌ ✓ Lewis D. Apsley (Republican) 53.74%; ▌Frederick S. Coolidge (Democratic) 43.30%; ▌Frank M. Forbush (Prohibition) 2.96%
Massachusetts 5	Moses T. Stevens; Redistricted from the 8th district	Democratic	1890	Incumbent re-elected.	▌ ✓ Moses T. Stevens (Democratic) 52.28%; ▌William S. Knox (Republican) 45.84%; ▌Walter A. Dutton (Prohibition) 1.89%
Massachusetts 6	William Cogswell; Redistricted from the 7th district	Republican	1886	Incumbent re-elected.	▌ ✓ William Cogswell (Republican) 58.42%; ▌Henry B. Little (Democratic) 36.47%; ▌E. Gerry Brown (Populist) 2.64%; ▌John H. Davis (Prohibition) 2.48%
Massachusetts 7	Henry Cabot Lodge; Redistricted from the 6th district	Republican	1886	Incumbent re-elected.	▌ ✓ Henry Cabot Lodge (Republican) 52.73%; ▌William Everett (Democratic) 44.63%; ▌Fred P. Greenwood (Prohibition) 2.64%
Massachusetts 8	John F. Andrew; Redistricted from the 3rd district	Democratic	1888	Incumbent lost re-election. Republican gain.	▌ ✓ Samuel W. McCall (Republican) 51.63%; ▌John F. Andrew (Democratic) 48.37%
Massachusetts 9	Joseph H. O'Neil; Redistricted from the 4th district	Democratic	1888	Incumbent re-elected.	▌ ✓ Joseph H. O'Neil (Democratic) 61.10%; ▌Benjamin C. Lane (Republican) 36.70%; ▌Alonzo A. Miner (Prohibition) 2.20%
Massachusetts 10	None (new district)			New seat. Independent Democratic gain.	▌ ✓ Michael J. McEttrick (Ind. Democratic) 33.44%; ▌Harrison H. Atwood (Republican) 31.03%; ▌William S. McNary (Democratic) 26.70%; ▌Richard C. Humphreys (Ind. Republican) 7.86%; ▌William W. Mayple (Prohibition) 0.96%
Massachusetts 11	George F. Williams; Redistricted from the 9th district	Democratic	1890	Incumbent lost re-election. Republican gain.	▌ ✓ William Franklin Draper (Republican) 53.13%; ▌George F. Williams (Democratic) 45.12%; ▌Joseph D. Hunt (Prohibition) 1.75%
Massachusetts 12	Elijah A. Morse; Redistricted from the 2nd district	Republican	1888	Incumbent re-elected.	▌ ✓ Elijah A. Morse (Republican) 56.03%; ▌Elbridge Cushman (Democratic) 41.01%; ▌George W. Dyer (Prohibition) 2.96%
Massachusetts 13	Charles S. Randall; Redistricted from the 1st district	Republican	1888	Incumbent re-elected.	▌ ✓ Charles S. Randall (Republican) 60.76%; ▌Henry C. Thacher (Democratic) 39.24%

== Michigan ==
District	Incumbent			This race	
District	Member	Party	First elected	Results	Candidates
Michigan 1	J. Logan Chipman	Democratic	1886	Incumbent re-elected.	▌ ✓ J. Logan Chipman (Democratic) 52.4%; ▌ Frank J. Hecker (Republican) 45.4%; ▌ Edward S. Grece (Populist) 1.5%; ▌ Frank W. Tomlinson (Prohibition) 0.7%
Michigan 2	James S. Gorman	Democratic	1890	Incumbent re-elected.	▌ ✓ James S. Gorman (Democratic) 47.0%; ▌ James O'Donnell (Republican) 45.8%; ▌ Robert C. Safford (Prohibition) 4.9%; ▌ George A. Peters (Populist) 2.3%
Michigan 2	James O'Donnell; Redistricted from the 3rd district	Republican	1884	Incumbent lost re-election. Republican loss.	▌ ✓ James S. Gorman (Democratic) 47.0%; ▌ James O'Donnell (Republican) 45.8%; ▌ Robert C. Safford (Prohibition) 4.9%; ▌ George A. Peters (Populist) 2.3%
Michigan 3	Julius C. Burrows; Redistricted from the 4th district	Republican	1884	Incumbent re-elected.	▌ ✓ Julius C. Burrows (Republican) 50.1%; ▌ Daniel Strange (Democratic) 37.2%; ▌ Leroy E. Lockwood (Populist) 6.8%; ▌ Paul T. Butler (Prohibition) 5.9%
Michigan 4	None (new district)			New seat. Republican gain.	▌ ✓ Henry F. Thomas (Republican) 49.1%; ▌ George L. Yaple (Democratic/Populist) 46.5%; ▌ John B. Sweetland (Prohibition) 4.4%
Michigan 5	Charles E. Belknap	Republican	1891	Incumbent lost re-election. Democratic gain.	▌ ✓ George F. Richardson (Democratic/Populist) 47.8%; ▌Charles E. Belknap (Republican) 47.8%; ▌ Lemuel Clute (Prohibition) 4.4%
Michigan 6	Byron G. Stout	Democratic	1890	Incumbent lost re-election. Republican gain.	▌ ✓ David D. Aitken (Republican) 46.5%; ▌ Byron G. Stout (Democratic) 43.5%; ▌ Arthur E. Cole (Populist) 5.1%; ▌ Byron Devendorph (Prohibition) 4.9%
Michigan 7	Justin R. Whiting	Democratic	1886	Incumbent re-elected.	▌ ✓ Justin R. Whiting (Democratic) 46.3%; ▌ Phillip S. Wixson (Republican) 44.8%; ▌ Alfred Pagett (Populist) 5.3%; ▌ Aaron G. Westbrook (Prohibition) 3.6%
Michigan 8	Henry M. Youmans	Democratic	1890	Incumbent lost re-election. Republican gain.	▌ ✓ William S. Linton (Republican) 49.2%; ▌ Henry M. Youmans (Democratic/Populist) 44.9%; ▌ Alfred F. Cooley (Prohibition) 3.2%; ▌ Daniel Thompson (Independent Populist) 2.7%
Michigan 9	Harrison H. Wheeler	Democratic	1890	Incumbent lost re-election. Republican gain.	▌ ✓ John W. Moon (Republican) 47.0%; ▌ Harrison H. Wheeler (Democratic) 43.9%; ▌ Charles A. Sessions (Prohibition) 5.6%; ▌ Charles S. Shouts (Populist) 3.5%
Michigan 10	Thomas A. E. Weadock	Democratic	1890	Incumbent re-elected.	▌ ✓ Thomas A. E. Weadock (Democratic) 47.7%; ▌ James Van Kleek (Republican) 46.8%; ▌ Joseph H. Belknap (Populist) 3.5%; ▌ Joseph Leighton (Prohibition) 2.0%
Michigan 11	None (new district)			New seat. Republican gain.	▌ ✓ John Avery (Republican) 50.6%; ▌ Woodbridge N. Ferris (Democratic/Populist) 44.2%; ▌ George P. Catton (Prohibition) 5.2%
Michigan 12	Samuel M. Stephenson; Redistricted from the 11th district	Republican	1888	Incumbent re-elected	▌ ✓ Samuel M. Stephenson (Republican) 50.7%; ▌ J. Maurice Finn (Democratic/Populist) 42.1%; ▌ Zina A. Clough (Prohibition) 4.8%; ▌ Gustave Deirnel (Independent) 2.3%; ▌ John R. Ryan (Independent) 0.1%

== Minnesota ==
District	Incumbent			This race	
District	Member	Party	First elected	Results	Candidates
Minnesota 1	William H. Harries	Democratic	1890	Incumbent lost re-election. Republican gain.	▌ ✓ James A. Tawney (Republican) 49.0%; ▌William H. Harries (Democratic) 40.5%; ▌James I. Vermilya (Populist) 6.3%; ▌Philip H. Harsh (Prohibition) 4.2%
Minnesota 2	John Lind	Republican	1886	Incumbent retired. Republican hold.	▌ ✓ James McCleary (Republican) 48.4%; ▌Winfield Scott Hammond (Democratic) 30.1%; ▌Lionel C. Long (Populist) 16.7%; ▌Edward H. Bronson (Prohibition) 4.9%
Minnesota 3	Osee M. Hall	Democratic	1890	Incumbent re-elected.	▌ ✓ Osee M. Hall (Democratic) 44.8%; ▌Joel Heatwole (Republican) 41.5%; ▌Ferdinand Borchert (Populist) 9.8%; ▌William B. Reed (Prohibition) 4.0%
Minnesota 4	James Castle	Democratic	1890	Incumbent lost re-election. Republican gain.	▌ ✓ Andrew Kiefer (Republican) 48.6%; ▌James Castle (Democratic) 39.2%; ▌James G. Dougherty (Populist) 6.5%; ▌David Morgan (Prohibition) 5.7%
Minnesota 5	Kittel Halvorson	Populist	1890	Incumbent lost renomination. Republican gain.	▌ ✓ Loren Fletcher (Republican) 46.1%; ▌James W. Lawrence (Democratic) 39.9%; ▌Thomas H. Lucas (Populist) 7.9%; ▌Thomas J. Caton (Prohibition) 6.1%
Minnesota 6	None (new district)			New seat. Democratic gain.	▌ ✓ Melvin Baldwin (Democratic) 43.4%; ▌Dolson B. Searle (Republican) 42.4%; ▌Abdiel C. Parsons (Populist) 10.0%; ▌Edward L. Curial (Prohibition) 4.2%
Minnesota 7	None (new district)			New seat. Populist gain.	▌ ✓ Haldor Boen (Populist) 35.6%; ▌Henry Feig (Republican) 35.4%; ▌William F. Kelso (Democratic) 21.3%; ▌Fred L. Hampson (Prohibition) 7.7%

== Mississippi ==
District	Incumbent			This race	
District	Member	Party	First elected	Results	Candidates
Mississippi 1	John M. Allen	Democratic	1884	Incumbent re-elected.	▌ ✓ John M. Allen (Democratic) 79.81%; ▌James Burkitt (Populist) 18.11%; ▌F. M. Nabors (Republican) 2.08%
Mississippi 2	John C. Kyle	Democratic	1890	Incumbent re-elected.	▌ ✓ John C. Kyle (Democratic) 77.84%; ▌J. H. Simpson (Populist) 22.16%
Mississippi 3	Thomas C. Catchings	Democratic	1884	Incumbent re-elected.	▌ ✓ Thomas C. Catchings (Democratic) 94.01%; ▌George W. Gayles (Republican) 5.99%
Mississippi 4	Clarke Lewis	Democratic	1888	Incumbent retired. Democratic hold.	▌ ✓ Hernando Money (Democratic) 61.44%; ▌Frank Burkett (Populist) 38.56%
Mississippi 5	Joseph H. Beeman	Democratic	1890	Incumbent retired. Democratic hold.	▌ ✓ John S. Williams (Democratic) 71.35%; ▌W. P. Ratliff (Populist) 28.65%
Mississippi 6	T. R. Stockdale	Democratic	1886	Incumbent re-elected.	▌ ✓ T. R. Stockdale (Democratic) 81.39%; ▌T. N. Jackson (Populist) 18.61%
Mississippi 7	Charles E. Hooker	Democratic	1886	Incumbent re-elected.	▌ ✓ Charles E. Hooker (Democratic) 72.38%; ▌S. W. Robinson (Populist) 24.62%; ▌John McGill (Republican) 3.01%

== Missouri ==
District	Incumbent			This race	
District	Member	Party	First elected	Results	Candidates
Missouri 1	William H. Hatch	Democratic	1878	Incumbent re-elected.	▌ ✓ William H. Hatch (Democratic) 50.04%; ▌Robert Cramer (Republican) 41.35%; ▌H. Bronson (Populist) 8.61%
Missouri 2	Charles H. Mansur	Democratic	1886	Incumbent retired. Democratic hold.	▌ ✓ Uriel S. Hall (Democratic) 53.65%; ▌A. H. Burkholder (Republican) 40.68%; ▌J. T. Jackson (Populist) 5.67%
Missouri 3	Alexander M. Dockery	Democratic	1882	Incumbent re-elected.	▌ ✓ Alexander M. Dockery (Democratic) 48.82%; ▌James N. Birch (Republican) 39.81%; ▌J. M. Reece (Populist) 11.37%
Missouri 4	Robert P. C. Wilson	Democratic	1889	Incumbent retired. Democratic hold.	▌ ✓ Daniel D. Burnes (Democratic) 46.70%; ▌George C. Crowther (Republican) 42.99%; ▌J. F. Wilcox (Populist) 9.49%; ▌C. W. Caseby (Prohibition) 0.82%
Missouri 5	John C. Tarsney	Democratic	1888	Incumbent re-elected.	▌ ✓ John C. Tarsney (Democratic) 55.04%; ▌Webster Davis (Republican) 40.39%; ▌C. D. Whitehead (Populist) 4.13%; ▌A. J. Powell (Prohibition) 0.45%
Missouri 6	David A. De Armond; Redistricted from the 12th district	Democratic	1890	Incumbent re-elected.	▌ ✓ David A. De Armond (Democratic) 46.31%; ▌W. H. Cundiff (Republican) 36.81%; ▌H. C. Donohue (Populist) 15.64%; ▌J. W. Lowry (Prohibition) 1.25%
Missouri 7	John T. Heard; Redistricted from the 6th district	Democratic	1884	Incumbent re-elected.	▌ ✓ John T. Heard (Democratic) 48.71%; ▌P. D. Hastain (Republican) 40.33%; ▌C. L. Pinkham (Populist) 10.96%
Missouri 8	Richard P. Bland; Redistricted from the 11th district	Democratic	1872	Incumbent re-elected.	▌ ✓ Richard P. Bland (Democratic) 53.34%; ▌W. H. Murphy (Republican) 46.37%; ▌George B. Armstrong (Independent) 0.29%
Missouri 9	Richard H. Norton; Redistricted from the 7th district	Democratic	1888	Incumbent lost renomination. Democratic hold.	▌ ✓ Champ Clark (Democratic) 53.05%; ▌W. L. Morsey (Republican) 45.20%; ▌William A. Dillon (Populist) 1.75%
Missouri 10	None (new district)			New seat. Republican gain.	▌ ✓ Richard Bartholdt (Republican) 54.55%; ▌Edward C. Kehr (Democratic) 43.51%; ▌Owen Miller (Populist) 1.94%
Missouri 11	John J. O'Neill; Redistricted from the 8th district	Democratic	1890	Incumbent lost re-election. Republican gain.	▌ ✓ Charles F. Joy (Republican) 53.34%; ▌John J. O'Neill (Democratic) 46.37%; Others: ▌J. B. Follett (Populist) 0.80%; ▌J. H. Garrison (Prohibition) 0.49%
Missouri 12	Seth W. Cobb; Redistricted from the 9th district	Democratic	1890	Incumbent re-elected.	▌ ✓ Seth W. Cobb (Democratic) 52.01%; ▌Thomas B. Rodgers (Republican) 46.60%; Others: ▌John Geither (Populist) 0.87%; ▌J. L. Parsons (Prohibition) 0.52%
Missouri 13	Robert W. Fyan	Democratic	1890	Incumbent re-elected.	▌ ✓ Robert W. Fyan (Democratic) 57.05%; ▌J. B. Whitledge (Republican) 42.82%; ▌C. W. Harding (Independent) 0.13%
Missouri 13	Samuel Byrns; Redistricted from the 10th district	Democratic	1890	Incumbent lost renomination. Democratic loss.	▌ ✓ Robert W. Fyan (Democratic) 57.05%; ▌J. B. Whitledge (Republican) 42.82%; ▌C. W. Harding (Independent) 0.13%
Missouri 14	Marshall Arnold	Democratic	1890	Incumbent re-elected.	▌ ✓ Marshall Arnold (Democratic) 49.79%; ▌M. B. Clarke (Republican) 40.31%; ▌T. E. Taber (Populist) 9.90%
Missouri 15	None (new district)			New seat. Democratic gain.	▌ ✓ Charles H. Morgan (Democratic) 44.17%; ▌George A. Purdy (Republican) 39.82%; ▌T. P. Withers (Populist) 14.69%; ▌W. T. Wright (Prohibition) 1.33%

== Montana ==
District	Incumbent			This race	
District	Member	Party	First elected	Results	Candidates
Montana at-large	William W. Dixon	Democratic	1890	Incumbent lost re-election. Republican gain.	▌ ✓ Charles S. Hartman (Republican) 41.40%; ▌William W. Dixon (Democratic) 41.00%; ▌Caldwell Edwards (Populist) 16.22%; ▌Benjamin R. Atkinson (Prohibition) 1.39%

== Nebraska ==
District	Incumbent			This race	
District	Member	Party	First elected	Results	Candidates
Nebraska 1	William Jennings Bryan	Democratic	1890	Incumbent re-elected.	▌ ✓ William Jennings Bryan (Democratic) 44.90%; ▌Allen W. Field (Republican) 44.44%; ▌Jerome Shamp (Populist) 7.85%; ▌R. W. Maxwell (Prohibition) 2.81%
Nebraska 2	None (new district)			New seat. Republican gain.	▌ ✓ David Henry Mercer (Republican) 45.25%; ▌George W. Doane (Democratic) 40.91%; ▌Robert L. Wheeler (Populist) 12.41%; ▌R. W. Richardson (Prohibition) 1.43%
Nebraska 3	None (new district)			New seat. Republican gain.	▌ ✓ George de Rue Meiklejohn (Republican) 39.22%; ▌George F. Keiper (Democratic) 30.57%; ▌William A. Poynter (Populist) 27.72%; ▌F. P. Wigton (Prohibition) 2.49%
Nebraska 4	None (new district)			New seat. Republican gain.	▌ ✓ Eugene J. Hainer (Republican) 41.80%; ▌William H. Dech (Populist) 30.68%; ▌Victor Vifquain (Democratic) 24.01%; ▌J. P. Kettlewell (Prohibition) 3.51%
Nebraska 5	William A. McKeighan; Redistricted from the 2nd district	Populist	1890	Incumbent re-elected.	▌ ✓ William A. McKeighan (Populist) 53.72%; ▌William E. Andrews (Republican) 43.71%; ▌O. C. Hubbell (Prohibition) 2.57%
Nebraska 6	Omer M. Kem; Redistricted from the 3rd district	Populist	1890	Incumbent re-elected.	▌ ✓ Omer M. Kem (Populist) 46.11%; ▌James Whitehead (Republican) 40.09%; ▌A. T. Gatewood (Democratic) 11.87%; ▌Orlando R. Beebe (Prohibition) 1.94%

== Nevada ==
District	Incumbent			This race	
District	Member	Party	First elected	Results	Candidates
Nevada at-large	Horace F. Bartine	Republican	1888	Incumbent retired. Silver gain.	▌ ✓ Francis G. Newlands (Silver) 72.52%; ▌William Woodburn (Republican) 23.21%; ▌J. C. Hagerman (Democratic) 3.49%; ▌C. H. Gardiner (Prohibition) 0.78%

== New Hampshire ==
District	Incumbent			This race	
District	Member	Party	First elected	Results	Candidates
New Hampshire 1	Luther F. McKinney	Democratic	1890	Incumbent retired. Republican gain.	▌ ✓ Henry W. Blair (Republican) 49.86%; ▌Charles F. Stone (Democratic) 48.40%; Others: ▌George D. Dodge (Prohibition) 1.43%; ▌Josiah A. Whittier (Populist) 0.32%
New Hampshire 2	Warren F. Daniell	Democratic	1890	Incumbent retired. Republican gain.	▌ ✓ Henry M. Baker (Republican) 49.40%; ▌Hosea W. Parker (Democratic) 48.41%; Others: ▌Charles E. Drury (Prohibition) 1.83%; ▌Elias Blodgett (Populist) 0.37%

== New Jersey ==
District	Incumbent			This race	
District	Member	Party	First elected	Results	Candidates
New Jersey 1	Christopher A. Bergen	Republican	1888	Incumbent lost renomination. Republican hold.	▌ ✓ Henry C. Loudenslager (Republican) 50.65%; ▌Frank M. Porch (Democratic) 45.43%; ▌Robert T. Seagraves (Prohibition) 3.92%
New Jersey 2	James Buchanan	Republican	1884	Incumbent retired. Republican hold.	▌ ✓ John J. Gardner (Republican) 50.68%; ▌George D. Wetherill (Democratic) 45.94%; ▌F. French (Prohibition) 3.01%; ▌D. Duroe (Populist) 0.38%
New Jersey 3	Jacob Augustus Geissenhainer	Democratic	1888	Incumbent re-elected.	▌ ✓ Jacob Augustus Geissenhainer (Democratic) 53.13%; ▌William T. Hoffman (Republican) 44.47%; ▌Arthur W. Marshall (Prohibition) 2.40%
New Jersey 4	Samuel Fowler	Democratic	1888	Incumbent retired. Democratic hold.	▌ ✓ Johnston Cornish (Democratic) 47.95%; ▌Benjamin Franklin Howey (Republican) 45.66%; ▌H. Johnston (Prohibition) 5.08%; ▌Erastus Potter (Populist) 1.31%
New Jersey 5	Cornelius A. Cadmus	Democratic	1890	Incumbent re-elected.	▌ ✓ Cornelius A. Cadmus (Democratic) 50.70%; ▌Henry Doherty (Republican) 47.12%; ▌C. H. Warner (Prohibition) 1.14%; ▌M. Richter (Socialist Labor) 1.05%
New Jersey 6	Thomas Dunn English	Democratic	1890	Incumbent re-elected.	▌ ✓ Thomas Dunn English (Democratic) 51.04%; ▌Richard W. Parker (Republican) 47.81%; Others: ▌S. S. Dorois (Prohibition) 0.97%; ▌Joseph R. Buchanan (Populist) 0.18%
New Jersey 7	Edward F. McDonald	Democratic	1890	Incumbent died November 5, 1892; Democratic hold.	▌ ✓ George B. Fielder (Democratic) 49.93%; ▌Frank O. Cole (Republican) 43.63%; ▌Edward F. McDonald (Democratic) 5.28%; Others: ▌C. Barthelmes (Socialist Labor) 0.56%; ▌J. S. Carman (Prohibition) 0.38%; ▌A. J. Zoller (Populist) 0.22%
New Jersey 8	None (new district)			New seat. Democratic gain.	▌ ✓ John T. Dunn (Democratic) 50.37%; ▌Winfield S. Chamberlin (Republican) 47.14%; Others: ▌Joel G. Van Cise (Prohibition) 1.76%; ▌John P. Weigel (Socialist Labor) 0.74%

== New York ==
District	Incumbent			This race	
District	Member	Party	First elected	Results	Candidates
New York 1	James W. Covert	Democratic	1888	Incumbent re-elected.	▌ ✓ James W. Covert (Democratic) 52.1%; ▌ John Lewis Childs (Republican) 45.3%; ▌ H. Fletcher Fordham (Prohibition) 2.6%
New York 2	John M. Clancy; Redistricted from the 4th district	Democratic	1888	Incumbent re-elected.	▌ ✓ John M. Clancy (Democratic) 59.1%; ▌ William H. Grace (Republican ) 38.8%; ▌ Isaac K. Funk (Prohibition) 1.3%; ▌ Michael J. Condon (Populist) 0.8%
New York 3	None (new district)			New seat. Democratic gain.	▌ ✓ Joseph C. Hendrix (Democratic) 55.9%; ▌ Michael J. Hady (Republican) 41.1%; ▌ David C. Beatty (Prohibition) 1.4%; ▌ Henry Studt (Socialist Labor) 0.9%; ▌ Stephen P. Waysland (Populist) 0.7%
New York 4	William J. Coombs; Redistricted from the 3rd district	Democratic	1890	Incumbent re-elected.	▌ ✓ William J. Coombs (Democratic) 58.5%; ▌ Charles B. Hobbs (Republican) 38.1%; ▌ Theodore F. Cuno (Socialist Labor) 1.5%; ▌ Morris H. Smith (Prohibition) 1.3%; ▌ John M. Snork (Populist) 0.3%
New York 4	Alfred C. Chapin; Redistricted from the 2nd district	Democratic	1891	Incumbent resigned. Democratic loss.	▌ ✓ William J. Coombs (Democratic) 58.5%; ▌ Charles B. Hobbs (Republican) 38.1%; ▌ Theodore F. Cuno (Socialist Labor) 1.5%; ▌ Morris H. Smith (Prohibition) 1.3%; ▌ John M. Snork (Populist) 0.3%
New York 5	None (new district)			New seat. Democratic gain.	▌ ✓ John H. Graham (Democratic) 50.8%; ▌ Charles G. Bennett (Republican) 44.2%; ▌ Henry Kuhn (Socialist Labor) 2.6%; ▌ Frank L. Brown (Prohibition) 1.5%; ▌ William G. Bourke (Populist) 0.9%
New York 6	Thomas F. Magner; Redistricted from the 5th district	Democratic	1888	Incumbent re-elected.	▌ ✓ Thomas F. Magner (Democratic) 56.1%; ▌ John Greaney (Republican) 39.7%; ▌ Gustav Schuleppendick (Socialist Labor) 2.5%; ▌ Frederick J. Brettain (Prohibition) 1.4%; ▌ James Allan (Populist) 0.3%
New York 7	None (new district)			New seat. Democratic gain.	▌ ✓ Franklin Bartlett (Democratic) 66.3%; ▌ Samuel A. Brown (Republican) 31.7%; ▌ Stephen D. Riddle (Prohibition) 2.0%
New York 8	Edward J. Dunphy; Redistricted from the 7th district	Democratic	1888	Incumbent re-elected.	▌ ✓ Edward J. Dunphy (Democratic) 66.3%; ▌ Austin E. Ford (Republican) 30.9%; ▌ William A. Crane (Prohibition) 1.0%; ▌ Joseph K. Newman (Socialist Labor) 0.9%; ▌ H. Alden Spencer (Populist) 0.9%
New York 9	Timothy J. Campbell; Redistricted from the 8th district	Democratic	1890	Incumbent re-elected.	▌ ✓ Timothy J. Campbell (Democratic) 66.2%; ▌ John Phelan (Republican) 28.1%; ▌ Aaron Henry (Socialist Labor) 4.7%; ▌ Timothy N. Holden (Prohibition) 1.0%
New York 10	None (new district)			New seat. Democratic gain.	▌ ✓ Daniel Sickles (Democratic) 58.0%; ▌ Charles E. Coon (Republican) 38.5%; ▌ Philip Schoettgen (Socialist Labor) 1.6%; ▌ George Gethin (Prohibition) 1.0%; ▌ George W. Reid (Populist) 0.9%
New York 11	Amos J. Cummings; Redistricted from the 9th district	Democratic	1889	Incumbent re-elected.	▌ ✓ Amos J. Cummings (Democratic) 63.0%; ▌ Abraham H. Sarasohn (Republican) 31.4%; ▌ George Sieburg (Socialist Labor) 4.2%; ▌ James Bahan (Populist) 0.7%; ▌ Browne C. Hammond (Prohibition) 0.7%
New York 12	William Bourke Cockran; Redistricted from the 10th district	Democratic	1891	Incumbent re-elected.	▌ ✓ William Bourke Cockran (Democratic) 65.6%; ▌ Daniel Butterfield (Republican) 30.7%; ▌ William Klingenberg (Socialist Labor) 2.0%; ▌ John J. Daly (Populist) 0.9%; ▌ Richard W. Turner (Prohibition) 0.8%
New York 13	J. De Witt Warner; Redistricted from the 11th district	Democratic	1890	Incumbent re-elected.	▌ ✓ J. De Witt Warner (Democratic) 60.8%; ▌ William C. Roberts (Republican) 35.8%; ▌ John J. Flick (Socialist Labor) 1.9%; ▌ David Rosseau (Populist) 0.8%; ▌ James M. Orr (Prohibition) 0.7%
New York 14	John R. Fellows; Redistricted from the 6th district	Democratic	1890	Incumbent re-elected.	▌ ✓ John R. Fellows (Democratic) 57.8%; ▌ H. Charles Ulman (Republican) 38.4%; ▌ John N. Bauman (Socialist Labor) 1.7%; ▌ George A. Hunter (Populist) 1.1%; ▌ Benjamin T. Rogers (Prohibition) 1.0%
New York 14	Joseph J. Little; Redistricted from the 12th district	Democratic	1891	Incumbent retired. Democratic loss.	▌ ✓ John R. Fellows (Democratic) 57.8%; ▌ H. Charles Ulman (Republican) 38.4%; ▌ John N. Bauman (Socialist Labor) 1.7%; ▌ George A. Hunter (Populist) 1.1%; ▌ Benjamin T. Rogers (Prohibition) 1.0%
New York 15	Ashbel P. Fitch; Redistricted from the 13th district	Democratic	1886	Incumbent re-elected.	▌ ✓ Ashbel P. Fitch (Democratic) 61.2%; ▌ Henry C. Robinson (Republican) 35.0%; ▌ Enoch K. Thomas (Socialist Labor) 2.3%; ▌ George B. Hillard (Prohibition) 0.8%; ▌ William W. Gleason (Populist) 0.7%
New York 16	William G. Stahlnecker; Redistricted from the 14th district	Democratic	1884	Incumbent retired. Democratic hold.	▌ ✓ William Ryan (Democratic) 55.0%; ▌ George A. Brandreth (Republican) 41.2%; ▌ Francis Crawford (Prohibition) 2.4%; ▌ Howard Balkam (Socialist Labor) 1.3%; ▌ Edward B. Foote (Populist) 0.1%
New York 17	Henry Bacon; Redistricted from the 15th district	Democratic	1890	Incumbent lost re-election. Republican gain.	▌ ✓ Francis Marvin (Republican) 48.5%; ▌ Henry Bacon (Democratic) 48.1%; ▌ Joseph M. Leeper (Prohibition) 3.4%
New York 18	John H. Ketcham; Redistricted from the 16th district	Republican	1876	Incumbent retired. Republican hold.	▌ ✓ Jacob LeFever (Republican) 49.3%; ▌ Isaac N. Cox (Democratic) 47.1%; ▌ George Q. Johnson (Prohibition) 3.6%
New York 18	Isaac N. Cox; Redistricted from the 17th district	Democratic	1890	Incumbent lost re-election. Democratic loss.	▌ ✓ Jacob LeFever (Republican) 49.3%; ▌ Isaac N. Cox (Democratic) 47.1%; ▌ George Q. Johnson (Prohibition) 3.6%
New York 19	John A. Quackenbush; Redistricted from the 18th district	Republican	1888	Incumbent lost re-election. Democratic gain.	▌ ✓ Charles Delemere Haines (Democratic) 50.7%; ▌ John A. Quackenbush (Republican) 46.6%; ▌ J. Wesley Jones (Prohibition) 2,7%
New York 20	Charles Tracey; Redistricted from the 19th district	Democratic	1887	Incumbent re-elected.	▌ ✓ Charles Tracey (Democratic) 50.3%; ▌ John G. Ward (Republican) 46.1%; ▌ William A. Dickinson (Prohibition) 1.6%; ▌ Daniel F. Lawlor (Independent) 1.1%; ▌ William F. Steer (Independent) 0.9%
New York 21	John Sanford; Redistricted from the 20th district	Republican	1888	Incumbent retired. Democratic gain.	▌ ✓ Simon J. Schermerhorn (Democratic) 49.5%; ▌ Erastus Flavel Beadle (Republican) 46.8%; ▌ Charles A. Alden (Prohibition) 3.7%
New York 21	George Van Horn; Redistricted from the 24th district	Democratic	1890	Incumbent lost renomination. Democratic loss.	▌ ✓ Simon J. Schermerhorn (Democratic) 49.5%; ▌ Erastus Flavel Beadle (Republican) 46.8%; ▌ Charles A. Alden (Prohibition) 3.7%
New York 22	Newton Martin Curtis	Republican	1891	Incumbent re-elected.	▌ ✓ Newton Martin Curtis (Republican) 57.4%; ▌ Warren Curtis (Democratic) 36.6%; ▌ William Whitney (Prohibition) 4.5%; ▌ John J. Kelly (Populist) 1.5%
New York 23	John M. Wever; Redistricted from the 21st district	Republican	1890	Incumbent re-elected.	▌ ✓ John M. Wever (Republican) 57.7%; ▌ George S. Weed (Democratic) 38.1%; ▌ Jonathan E. Hoag (Prohibition) 3.1%; ▌ DeMyre S. Fero (Populist) 1.1%
New York 24	None (new district)			New seat. Republican gain.	▌ ✓ Charles A. Chickering (Republican) 55.8%; ▌ William A. Kelly (Democratic) 40.4%; ▌ Alonzo M. Leffingwell (Prohibition) 3.7%
New York 25	Henry Wilbur Bentley; Redistricted from the 23rd district	Democratic	1890	Incumbent lost re-election. Republican gain.	▌ ✓ James S. Sherman (Republican) 49.7%; ▌ Henry Wilbur Bentley (Democratic) 46.9%; ▌ W. Fletcher Curtis (Prohibition) 3.3%
New York 26	George W. Ray	Republican	1890	Incumbent re-elected.	▌ ✓ George W. Ray (Republican) 85.9%; ▌ George F. Hand (Prohibition) 11.5%; ▌ DeWitt D. Smith (Populist) 2.6%
New York 27	James J. Belden; Redistricted from the 25th district	Republican	1887	Incumbent re-elected.	▌ ✓ James J. Belden (Republican) 55.5%; ▌ Riley V. Miller (Democratic) 39.7%; ▌ DeWitt Hooker (Prohibition) 3.5%; ▌ J. Madison Hall (Populist) 1.3%
New York 28	Sereno E. Payne; Redistricted from the 27th district	Republican	1889	Incumbent re-elected.	▌ ✓ Sereno E. Payne (Republican) 55.3%; ▌ Hull Greenfield (Democratic) 39.7%; ▌ Alva H. Morrill (Prohibition) 4.6%; ▌ Herbert L. Case (Populist) 0.4%
New York 28	John Raines; Redistricted from the 29th district	Republican	1888	Incumbent retired. Republican loss.	▌ ✓ Sereno E. Payne (Republican) 55.3%; ▌ Hull Greenfield (Democratic) 39.7%; ▌ Alva H. Morrill (Prohibition) 4.6%; ▌ Herbert L. Case (Populist) 0.4%
New York 29	Hosea H. Rockwell; Redistricted from the 28th district	Democratic	1890	Incumbent retired. Republican gain.	▌ ✓ Charles W. Gillet (Republican) 50.4%; ▌ Franz S. Wolf (Democratic) 41.5%; ▌ Albert C. Hill (Prohibition) 5.3%; ▌ William M. Martin (Populist) 2.8%
New York 30	James W. Wadsworth; Redistricted from the 31st district	Republican	1890	Incumbent re-elected.	▌ ✓ James W. Wadsworth (Republican) 51.2%; ▌ John F. McDonald (Democratic) 41.6%; ▌ Albert J. Rumsey (Prohibition) 5.3%; ▌ Leonard C. Roberts (Populist) 1.9%
New York 31	Halbert S. Greenleaf; Redistricted from the 30th district	Democratic	1890	Incumbent retired. Republican gain.	▌ ✓ John Van Voorhis (Republican) 47.8%; ▌ Donald McNaughton (Democratic) 46.6%; ▌ James S. Frost (Prohibition) 2.8%; ▌ James Goodno (Populist) 1.5%; ▌ Carl A. Ludecke (Socialist Labor) 1.3%
New York 32	Daniel N. Lockwood	Democratic	1890	Incumbent re-elected.	▌ ✓ Daniel N. Lockwood (Democratic) 52.9%; ▌ Rowland B. Mahany (Republican) 41.8%; ▌ Herman F. Trapper (Populist) 2.0%; ▌ Guy C. Martin (Prohibition) 1.9%; ▌ John W. Weigand (Socialist Labor) 1.4%
New York 33	Thomas L. Bunting	Democratic	1890	Incumbent retired. Republican gain.	▌ ✓ Charles Daniels (Republican) 53.0%; ▌ John S. Hertel (Democratic) 41.8%; ▌ William S. Hamilton (Prohibition) 2.5%; ▌ Sylvester E. Croll (Populist) 1.7%; ▌ Louis G. Kuhn (Socialist Labor) 1.0%
New York 34	Warren B. Hooker	Republican	1890	Incumbent re-elected.	▌ ✓ Warren B. Hooker (Republican) 55.0%; ▌ Andrew J. McNett (Democratic) 33.3%; ▌ Benjamin W. Taylor (Prohibition) 6.4%; ▌ F. Eugene Hammond (Populist) 5.3%

== North Carolina ==
District	Incumbent			This race	
District	Member	Party	First elected	Results	Candidates
North Carolina 1	William A. B. Branch	Democratic	1890	Incumbent re-elected.	▌ ✓ William A. B. Branch (Democratic) 55.1%; ▌ Reddick Gatling (Populist) 44.7%; ▌ Robert T. Bonner (Prohibition) 0.2%
North Carolina 2	Henry P. Cheatham	Republican	1888	Incumbent lost re-election. Democratic gain.	▌ ✓ Frederick A. Woodard (Democratic) 44.4%; ▌ Henry P. Cheatham (Republican) 37.9%; ▌ Edward A. Thorne (Populist) 17.4%
North Carolina 3	Benjamin F. Grady	Democratic	1890	Incumbent re-elected.	▌ ✓ Benjamin F. Grady (Democratic) 45.0%; ▌ Frank D. Koonce (Populist) 35.6%; ▌ Asoph M. Clark (Republican) 19.0%
North Carolina 4	Benjamin H. Bunn	Democratic	1888	Incumbent re-elected.	▌ ✓ Benjamin H. Bunn (Democratic) 48.4%; ▌ William F. Strowd (Populist) 43.4%; ▌ John H. Williamson (Republican) 7.0%; ▌ Horace J. Dowell (Prohibition) 1.2%
North Carolina 5	A. H. A. Williams	Democratic	1890	Incumbent lost re-election. Republican gain.	▌ ✓ Thomas Settle (Republican) 43.3%; ▌ A. H. A. Williams (Democratic) 42.1%; ▌ William R. Lindsay (Populist) 13.3%; ▌ William Love (Prohibition) 1.3%
North Carolina 6	Sydenham B. Alexander	Democratic	1890	Incumbent re-elected.	▌ ✓ Sydenham B. Alexander (Democratic) 57.8%; ▌ Atlas A. Maynard (Populist) 42.1%
North Carolina 7	John S. Henderson	Democratic	1884	Incumbent re-elected.	▌ ✓ John S. Henderson (Democratic) 49.2%; ▌ Alfred E. Holton (Republican) 31.4%; ▌ Alonzo C. Shuford (Populist) 18.6%; ▌ William H. Moffitt (Prohibition) 0.8%
North Carolina 8	William H. H. Cowles	Democratic	1884	Incumbent retired. Democratic hold.	▌ ✓ William H. Bower (Democratic) 50.1%; ▌ Joseph B. Wilcox (Republican) 39.2%; ▌ Robert L. Patton (Populist) 10.6%; ▌ William M. White (Prohibition) 0.1%
North Carolina 9	William T. Crawford	Democratic	1890	Incumbent re-elected.	▌ ✓ William T. Crawford (Democratic) 50.9%; ▌ Jeter C. Pritchard (Republican) 46.3%

== North Dakota ==
District	Incumbent			This race	
District	Member	Party	First elected	Results	Candidates
North Dakota at-large	Martin N. Johnson	Republican	1890	Incumbent re-elected.	▌ ✓ Martin N. Johnson (Republican) 48.95%; ▌James F. O'Brien (Democratic) 30.49%; ▌Hans A. Foss (Independent) 20.56%

== Ohio ==
District	Incumbent			This race	
District	Member	Party	First elected	Results	Candidates
Ohio 1	Bellamy Storer	Republican	1890	Incumbent re-elected.	▌ ✓ Bellamy Storer (Republican) 50.58%; ▌Robert B. Bowler (Democratic) 47.29%; Others: ▌Emar M. Davis (Populist) 1.30%; ▌George M. Hammell (Prohibition) 0.83%
Ohio 2	John A. Caldwell	Republican	1888	Incumbent re-elected.	▌ ✓ John A. Caldwell (Republican) 51.46%; ▌Charles T. Grieve (Democratic) 46.45%; Others: ▌John W. Harrington (Populist) 1.49%; ▌Lorenzo D. McGowan (Prohibition) 0.60%
Ohio 3	George W. Houk	Democratic	1890	Incumbent re-elected.	▌ ✓ George W. Houk (Democratic) 52.99%; ▌Charles C. Donley (Republican) 43.72%; ▌James M. Scott (Prohibition) 2.40%; ▌William F. Lukey (Populist) 0.90%
Ohio 4
Ohio 4	Fernando C. Layton; Redistricted from the 5th district	Democratic	1890	Incumbent re-elected.	▌ ✓ Fernando C. Layton (Democratic) 56.69%; ▌C. S. Mauk (Republican) 35.60%; ▌Peter A. Miller (Populist) 4.44%; ▌Uriah M. Styles (Prohibition) 3.27%
Ohio 5	Dennis D. Donovan; Redistricted from the 6th district	Democratic	1890	Incumbent re-elected.	▌ ✓ Dennis D. Donovan (Democratic) 53.35%; ▌George L. Griffith (Republican) 40.99%; ▌A. A. Weaver (Populist) 2.86%; ▌D. W. Cramer (Prohibition) 2.80%
Ohio 6	John M. Pattison; Redistricted from the 11th district	Democratic	1890	Incumbent lost re-election. Republican gain.	▌ ✓ George W. Hulick (Republican) 51.44%; ▌John M. Pattison (Democratic) 43.60%; ▌Alva Crabtree (Prohibition) 3.31%; ▌Charles B. Edwards (Populist) 1.65%
Ohio 6	Robert E. Doan; Redistricted from the 10th district	Republican	1890	Incumbent lost renomination. Republican loss.	▌ ✓ George W. Hulick (Republican) 51.44%; ▌John M. Pattison (Democratic) 43.60%; ▌Alva Crabtree (Prohibition) 3.31%; ▌Charles B. Edwards (Populist) 1.65%
Ohio 7	Martin K. Gantz; Redistricted from the 4th district	Democratic	1890	Incumbent lost re-election. Republican gain.	▌ ✓ George W. Wilson (Republican) 49.64%; ▌Martin K. Gantz (Democratic) 44.98%; ▌John F. Keating (Prohibition) 3.87%; ▌J. B. Morgridge (Populist) 1.51%
Ohio 8	None (new district)			New seat. Republican gain.	▌ ✓ Luther M. Strong (Republican) 51.69%; ▌Fremont Arford (Democratic) 43.71%; ▌Robert W. Laughlin (Prohibition) 4.50%; ▌Nathaniel R. Piper (Populist) 0.11%
Ohio 9	None (new district)			New seat. Democratic gain.	▌ ✓ Byron F. Ritchie (Democratic) 48.04%; ▌James Mitchell Ashley (Republican) 48.01%; ▌William G. Leet (Prohibition) 2.64%; ▌William Dunnipace (Populist) 1.31%
Ohio 10	William H. Enochs; Redistricted from the 12th district	Republican	1890	Incumbent re-elected.	▌ ✓ William H. Enochs (Republican) 55.16%; ▌James I. Dungan (Democratic) 43.04%; ▌Leroy W. Ellsworth (Prohibition) 1.80%
Ohio 10	James I. Dungan; Redistricted from the 13th district	Democratic	1890	Incumbent lost re-election. Democratic loss.	▌ ✓ William H. Enochs (Republican) 55.16%; ▌James I. Dungan (Democratic) 43.04%; ▌Leroy W. Ellsworth (Prohibition) 1.80%
Ohio 11	None (new district)			New seat. Republican gain.	▌ ✓ Charles H. Grosvenor (Republican) 51.41%; ▌Charles E. Peoples (Democratic) 44.56%; ▌Charles B. Taylor (Prohibition) 2.54%; ▌Milton B. Cooley (Populist) 1.49%
Ohio 12	Joseph H. Outhwaite; Redistricted from the 9th district	Democratic	1884	Incumbent re-elected.	▌ ✓ Joseph H. Outhwaite (Democratic) 52.63%; ▌Edward N. Huggins (Republican) 44.19%; ▌Albert Dunlap (Prohibition) 2.09%; ▌Edward J. Bracken (Populist) 1.10%
Ohio 13	Darius D. Hare; Redistricted from the 8th district	Democratic	1890	Incumbent re-elected.	▌ ✓ Darius D. Hare (Democratic) 54.83%; ▌Lewis W. Hull (Republican) 40.66%; ▌Marcus B. Chase (Prohibition) 2.49%; ▌John N. Smith (Populist) 2.02%
Ohio 13	William E. Haynes; Redistricted from the 7th district	Democratic	1888	Incumbent retired. Democratic Loss.	▌ ✓ Darius D. Hare (Democratic) 54.83%; ▌Lewis W. Hull (Republican) 40.66%; ▌Marcus B. Chase (Prohibition) 2.49%; ▌John N. Smith (Populist) 2.02%
Ohio 14	Michael D. Harter; Redistricted from the 15th district	Democratic	1890	Incumbent re-elected.	▌ ✓ Michael D. Harter (Democratic) 49.79%; ▌Elizur G. Johnson (Republican) 45.57%; ▌John Richardson (Prohibition) 3.51%; ▌A. W. Myers (Populist) 1.13%
Ohio 15	Joseph D. Taylor; Redistricted from the 18th district	Republican	1886	Incumbent retired. Republican hold.	▌ ✓ Henry Clay Van Voorhis (Republican) 49.43%; ▌Milton Turner (Democratic) 46.35%; ▌John M. Wilkin (Prohibition) 3.40%; ▌Stephen R. Crumbacker (Populist) 0.82%
Ohio 16	Albert J. Pearson; Redistricted from the 17th district	Democratic	1890	Incumbent re-elected.	▌ ✓ Albert J. Pearson (Democratic) 47.45%; ▌Christian L. Poorman (Republican) 47.33%; ▌Hiram Cope (Prohibition) 4.23%; ▌W. L. Browning (Populist) 1.00%
Ohio 17	James W. Owens; Redistricted from the 14th district	Democratic	1888	Incumbent retired. Democratic hold.	▌ ✓ James A. D. Richards (Democratic) 55.82%; ▌Arthur H. Walkey (Republican) 40.45%; ▌Charles Rhodes (Prohibition) 3.54%; ▌Rezin B. Wasson (Ind. Democratic) 0.18%
Ohio 18	None (new district)			New seat. Democratic gain.	▌ ✓ George P. Ikirt (Democratic) 48.20%; ▌Thomas R. Morgan (Republican) 45.62%; ▌Matthew H. Shay (Prohibition) 3.59%; ▌John W. Northrop (Populist) 2.60%
Ohio 19	Ezra B. Taylor	Republican	1880	Incumbent retired. Republican hold.	▌ ✓ Stephen A. Northway (Republican) 55.23%; ▌A. H. Tidball (Democratic) 37.18%; ▌Bailey S. Dean (Prohibition) 5.06%; ▌George A. Wise (Populist) 2.53%
Ohio 20	Vincent A. Taylor	Republican	1890	Incumbent retired. Republican hold.	▌ ✓ William J. White (Republican) 49.12%; ▌John S. Ellen (Democratic) 46.42%; ▌Grandison N. Tuttle (Prohibition) 2.64%; ▌Hubert Nettleton (Populist) 1.82%
Ohio 21	Tom L. Johnson	Democratic	1890	Incumbent re-elected.	▌ ✓ Tom L. Johnson (Democratic) 53.39%; ▌Orlando J. Hodge (Republican) 43.49%; Others: ▌Isaac Cowen (Prohibition) 1.75%; ▌Charles W. Wooldridge (Populist) 1.38%

== Oregon ==
District	Incumbent			This race	
District	Member	Party	First elected	Results	Candidates
Oregon 1	Binger Hermann	Republican	1884	Incumbent re-elected.	▌ ✓ Binger Hermann (Republican) 46.45%; ▌R. M. Veatch (Democratic) 31.95%; ▌M. V. Rork (Populist) 18.45%; ▌Winfield T. Rigdon (Prohibition) 3.15%
Oregon 2	None (new district)			New seat. Republican gain.	▌ ✓ William R. Ellis (Republican) 44.87%; ▌James H. Slater (Democratic) 34.73%; ▌John C. Luce (Populist) 17.02%; ▌Cornelius J. Bright (Prohibition) 3.38%

== Pennsylvania ==
District	Incumbent			This race	
District	Member	Party	First elected	Results	Candidates
Pennsylvania 1	Henry H. Bingham	Republican	1878	Incumbent re-elected.	▌ ✓ Henry H. Bingham (Republican) 62.6%; ▌ Edwin G Flanigen (Democratic) 37.4%
Pennsylvania 2	Charles O'Neill	Republican	1872	Incumbent re-elected.	▌ ✓ Charles O'Neill (Republican) 64.0%; ▌ John J. Malony (Democratic) 36.0%
Pennsylvania 3	William McAleer	Democratic	1890	Incumbent re-elected as an Independent Democratic candidate. Independent Democratic gain.	▌ ✓ William McAleer (Ind. Democratic/Republican) 73.8%; ▌ William W. Kerr (Democratic) 26.2%
Pennsylvania 4	John E. Reyburn	Republican	1890	Incumbent re-elected.	▌ ✓ John E. Reyburn (Republican) 61.4%; ▌ Elbridge E. Nock (Democratic) 37.9%; ▌ John W. Bentley (Prohibition) 0.8%
Pennsylvania 5	Alfred C. Harmer	Republican	1876	Incumbent re-elected.	▌ ✓ Alfred C. Harmer (Republican) 60.4%; ▌ Frederick A. Herwig (Democratic) 39.6%
Pennsylvania 6	John B. Robinson	Republican	1890	Incumbent re-elected.	▌ ✓ John B. Robinson (Republican) 55.3%; ▌ Garrett C. Smedley (Democratic) 40.3%; ▌ Daniel G. Hendricks (Prohibition) 4.4%
Pennsylvania 7	Edwin Hallowell	Democratic	1890	Incumbent lost re-election. Republican gain.	▌ ✓ Irving P. Wanger (Republican) 49.5%; ▌ Edwin Hallowell (Democratic) 49.0%; ▌ William S. Essick (Prohibition) 1.5%
Pennsylvania 8	William Mutchler	Democratic	1888	Incumbent re-elected.	▌ ✓ William Mutchler (Democratic) 60.6%; ▌ Thomas C. Walton (Republican) 39.4%
Pennsylvania 9	David B. Brunner	Democratic	1888	Incumbent retired. Democratic hold.	▌ ✓ Constantine J. Erdman (Democratic) 62.1%; ▌ Henry A. Muhlenberg (Republican) 37.9%
Pennsylvania 10	Marriott Brosius	Republican	1888	Incumbent re-elected.	▌ ✓ Marriott Brosius (Republican/Prohibition) 66.9%; ▌ John E. Malone (Democratic) 33.1%
Pennsylvania 11	Lemuel Amerman	Democratic	1890	Incumbent lost re-election. Republican gain.	▌ ✓ Joseph A. Scranton (Republican) 49.0%; ▌ Lemuel Amerman (Democratic) 46.3%; ▌ Ebenezer K. Griffiths (Prohibition) 4.7%
Pennsylvania 12	George W. Shonk	Republican	1890	Incumbent retired. Democratic gain.	▌ ✓ William Henry Hines (Democratic) 50.1%; ▌ Charles D. Foster (Republican) 45.4%; ▌ Charles H. Cool (Prohibition) 4.5%
Pennsylvania 13	James B. Reilly	Democratic	1888	Incumbent re-elected.	▌ ✓ James B. Reilly (Democratic) 53.2%; ▌ Charles N. Brumm (Republican) 45.7%; ▌ Joseph Birdsall (Prohibition) 1.1%
Pennsylvania 14	John W. Rife	Republican	1888	Incumbent retired. Republican hold.	▌ ✓ Ephraim M. Woomer (Republican) 56.0%; ▌ William M. Breslin (Democratic) 41.1%; ▌ Ezra Grumbine (Prohibition) 2.9%
Pennsylvania 15	Myron B. Wright	Republican	1888	Incumbent re-elected.	▌ ✓ Myron B. Wright (Republican) 55.1%; ▌ Roger S. Searle (Democratic) 40.4%; ▌ Charles H. Dana (Prohibition) 4.5%
Pennsylvania 16	Albert C. Hopkins	Republican	1890	Incumbent re-elected.	▌ ✓ Albert C. Hopkins (Republican) 52.6%; ▌ Frederick K. Wright (Democratic) 43.1%; ▌ Benjamin G. Welsh (Prohibition) 4.3%
Pennsylvania 17	Simon P. Wolverton	Democratic	1890	Incumbent re-elected.	▌ ✓ Simon P. Wolverton (Democratic) 58.3%; ▌ Chandlee Eves (Republican) 38.2%; ▌ Isaiah Bowers (Prohibition) 3.5%
Pennsylvania 18	Louis E. Atkinson	Republican	1882	Incumbent declined renomination. Republican hold.	▌ ✓ Thaddeus M. Mahon (Republican) 54.1%; ▌ William W. Trout (Democratic) 44.0%; ▌ Jerome A. Ailman (Prohibition) 1.9%
Pennsylvania 19	Frank E. Beltzhoover	Democratic	1890	Incumbent re-elected,	▌ ✓ Frank E. Beltzhoover (Democratic) 56.5%; ▌ Nesbit S. Ross (Republican) 41.7%; ▌ John B. Young (Prohibition) 1.8%
Pennsylvania 20	Edward Scull	Republican	1886	Incumbent retired. Republican hold.	▌ ✓ Josiah D. Hicks (Republican) 56.0%; ▌ Lucian D. Woodruff (Democratic) 43.2%; ▌ George H. Hocking (Prohibition) 0.4%; ▌ David D. Blanch (Populist) 0.4%
Pennsylvania 21	George F. Huff	Republican	1890	Incumbent retired. Republican hold.	▌ ✓ Daniel B. Heiner (Republican) 52.6%; ▌ John B. Keenan (Democratic) 44.4%; ▌ Erhart L. Grabill (Prohibition) 2.6%; ▌ Thomas B. Holt (Populist) 0.4%
Pennsylvania 22	John Dalzell	Republican	1886	Incumbent re-elected.	▌ ✓ John Dalzell (Republican) 58.3%; ▌ James W. Breen (Democratic) 41.0%; ▌ Thomas J. McConnell (Prohibition) 0.7%
Pennsylvania 23	William A. Stone	Republican	1890	Incumbent re-elected.	▌ ✓ William A. Stone (Republican) 63.6%; ▌ Frank C. Osburn (Democratic) 35.6%; ▌ J. H. Stevenson (Prohibition) 0.8%
Pennsylvania 24	Alexander Kerr Craig	Democratic	1890	Incumbent died. Winner also elected to finish term. Democratic hold.	▌ ✓ William A. Sipe (Democratic) 48.2%; ▌ Ernest F. Acheson (Republican) 45.8%; ▌ Albert K. Williamson (Prohibition) 3.3%; ▌ Campbell Jobes (Independent Republican) 1.8%; ▌ Jerome B. Aiken (Populist) 1.0%
Pennsylvania 25	Eugene P. Gillespie	Democratic	1890	Incumbent lost re-election. Republican gain.	▌ ✓ Thomas Wharton Phillips (Republican) 51.8%; ▌ Eugene P. Gillespie (Democratic) 41.0%; ▌ Judson W. Van DeVenter (Prohibition) 5.1%; ▌ Lewis Edwards (Populist) 2.2%
Pennsylvania 26	Matthew Griswold	Republican	1890	Incumbent retired. Democratic gain.	▌ ✓ Joseph C. Sibley (Democratic) 54.9%; ▌ Theodore L Flood (Republican) 44.5%; ▌ Frank W. Hirt (Labor) 0.6%
Pennsylvania 27	Charles W. Stone	Republican	1890	Incumbent re-elected.	▌ ✓ Charles W. Stone (Republican) 51.9%; ▌ James D. Hancock (Democratic) 39.6%; ▌ Charles Lott (Prohibition) 6.2%; ▌ [FNU] Ayres (Populist) 2.4%
Pennsylvania 28	George F. Kribbs	Democratic	1890	Incumbent re-elected.	▌ ✓ George F. Kribbs (Democratic) 54.3%; ▌ Charles E. Andrews (Republican) 41.7%; ▌ William S. Bigelow (Prohibition) 4.0%
Pennsylvania at-large 2 seats on a general ticket.	None (new seat)			New seat. Republican gain.	▌ ✓ William Lilly (Republican) 25.8%; ▌ ✓ Alexander McDowell (Republican) 25.8%; ▌ George A. Allen (Democratic) 22.6%; ▌ Thomas Polk Merritt (Democratic) 22.6%; ▌ Simeon B. Chase (Prohibition) 1.2%; ▌ James T. McCrory (Prohibition) 1.2%; ▌ S. P. Chase (Populist) 0.4%; ▌ G. W. Dawson (Populist) 0.4%; ▌ J. M. Barnes (Socialist Labor) 0.1%; ▌ Thomas Grundy (Socialist Labor) 0.1%
Pennsylvania at-large 2 seats on a general ticket.	None (new seat)			New seat. Republican gain.	▌ ✓ William Lilly (Republican) 25.8%; ▌ ✓ Alexander McDowell (Republican) 25.8%; ▌ George A. Allen (Democratic) 22.6%; ▌ Thomas Polk Merritt (Democratic) 22.6%; ▌ Simeon B. Chase (Prohibition) 1.2%; ▌ James T. McCrory (Prohibition) 1.2%; ▌ S. P. Chase (Populist) 0.4%; ▌ G. W. Dawson (Populist) 0.4%; ▌ J. M. Barnes (Socialist Labor) 0.1%; ▌ Thomas Grundy (Socialist Labor) 0.1%

== Rhode Island ==
District	Incumbent			This race	
District	Member	Party	First elected	Results	Candidates
Rhode Island 1	Oscar Lapham	Democratic	1890	Incumbent re-elected late on a run-off ballot.	First ballot (November 8, 1892): ▌ Melville Bull (Republican) 49.33%; ▌ Oscar Lapham (Democratic) 47.19%; ▌ Isaac C. Turner (Prohibition) 2.68%; ▌[FNU] Chace (Populist) 0.80%; Second ballot (April 5, 1893): ▌ ✓ Oscar Lapham (Democratic) 49.70%; ▌Melville Bull (Republican) 45.83%; ▌Isaac J. Turner (Prohibition) 4.48%
Rhode Island 2	Charles H. Page	Democratic	1890	Incumbent re-elected late on a run-off ballot.	First ballot (November 8, 1892): ▌ Adin B. Capron (Republican) 49.67%; ▌ Charles H. Page (Democratic) 45.27%; ▌ Edwin A. Lewis (Prohibition) 4.37%; ▌Henry A. Burlingame (Populist) 0.70%; Second ballot (April 5, 1893): ▌ ✓ Charles H. Page (Democratic) 48.25%; ▌Adin B. Capron (Republican) 44.79%; ▌Edwin A. Lewis (Prohibition) 6.97%

== South Carolina ==
District	Incumbent			This race	
District	Member	Party	First elected	Results	Candidates
South Carolina 1	William H. Brawley	Democratic	1890	Incumbent re-elected.	▌ ✓ William H. Brawley (Democratic) 100%; Uncontested
South Carolina 2	George D. Tillman	Democratic	1882	Incumbent lost renomination. Democratic hold.	▌ ✓ W. Jasper Talbert (Democratic) 100%; Uncontested
South Carolina 3	George Johnstone	Democratic	1890	Incumbent retired. Democratic hold.	▌ ✓ Asbury Latimer (Democratic) 89.69%; ▌John Tolbert (Republican) 8.47%; ▌W. W. Russell (Unknown) 1.84%
South Carolina 4	George W. Shell	Democratic	1890	Incumbent re-elected.	▌ ✓ George W. Shell (Democratic) 85.74%; ▌Joshua Ensor (Unknown) 14.26%
South Carolina 5	John J. Hemphill	Democratic	1882	Incumbent lost renomination. Democratic hold.	▌ ✓ Thomas J. Strait (Democratic) 80.73%; ▌E. Brooks Sligh (Republican) 19.28%
South Carolina 6	Eli T. Stackhouse	Democratic	1890	Incumbent died June 14, 1892. Democratic hold.	▌ ✓ John L. McLaurin (Democratic) 84.69%; ▌E. J. Sawyer (Republican) 15.31%
South Carolina 7	William Elliott	Democratic	1890	Incumbent retired. Republican gain.	▌ ✓ George W. Murray (Republican) 49.99%; ▌E. M. Moise (Democratic) 49.59%; Scattering 0.42%

== South Dakota ==
District	Incumbent			This race	
District	Member	Party	First elected	Results	Candidates
South Dakota at-large 2 seats	John Pickler	Republican	1889	Incumbent re-elected.	▌ ✓ John Pickler (Republican) 25.58%; ▌ ✓ William V. Lucas (Republican) 25.22%; ▌John Edward Kelley (Independent) 19.28%; ▌William Lardner (Independent) 18.59%; ▌L. E. Whitcher (Democratic) 10.77%; ▌Chauncey L. Wood (Democratic) 0.56%
South Dakota at-large 2 seats	John L. Jolley	Republican	1891 (special)	Incumbent retired. Republican hold.	▌ ✓ John Pickler (Republican) 25.58%; ▌ ✓ William V. Lucas (Republican) 25.22%; ▌John Edward Kelley (Independent) 19.28%; ▌William Lardner (Independent) 18.59%; ▌L. E. Whitcher (Democratic) 10.77%; ▌Chauncey L. Wood (Democratic) 0.56%

== Tennessee ==
District	Incumbent			This race	
District	Member	Party	First elected	Results	Candidates
Tennessee 1	Alfred A. Taylor	Republican	1888	Incumbent re-elected.	▌ ✓ Alfred A. Taylor (Republican) 56.02%; ▌W. J. McSween (Democratic) 41.35%; ▌A. R. Vance (Prohibition) 2.63%
Tennessee 2	John C. Houk	Republican	1891 (special)	Incumbent re-elected.	▌ ✓ John C. Houk (Republican) 67.13%; ▌W. L. Welcker (Democratic) 27.68%; ▌Will A. McTeer (Prohibition) 2.71%; ▌Albert Chavaness (Populist) 2.47%
Tennessee 3	Henry C. Snodgrass	Democratic	1890	Incumbent re-elected.	▌ ✓ Henry C. Snodgrass (Democratic) 47.45%; ▌Henry C. Evans (Republican) 44.64%; ▌Frank P. Dickey (Populist) 6.45%; ▌[FNU] Searle (Prohibition) 1.46%
Tennessee 4	Benton McMillin	Democratic	1878	Incumbent re-elected.	▌ ✓ Benton McMillin (Democratic) 55.52%; ▌W. D. Gold (Republican) 44.48%
Tennessee 5	James D. Richardson	Democratic	1884	Incumbent re-elected.	▌ ✓ James D. Richardson (Democratic) 61.13%; ▌Thomas J. Ogilivie (Populist) 35.95%; ▌A. S. Stewart (Prohibition) 2.92%
Tennessee 6	Joseph E. Washington	Democratic	1886	Incumbent re-elected.	▌ ✓ Joseph E. Washington (Democratic) 61.96%; ▌John B. Allen (Populist) 35.65%; ▌H. C. Merritt (Prohibition) 2.40%
Tennessee 7	Nicholas N. Cox	Democratic	1890	Incumbent re-elected.	▌ ✓ Nicholas N. Cox (Democratic) 57.54%; ▌W. A. Witherspoon (Populist) 40.28%; ▌[FNU] Swaltham (Prohibition) 2.18%
Tennessee 8	Benjamin A. Enloe	Democratic	1886	Incumbent re-elected.	▌ ✓ Benjamin A. Enloe (Democratic) 50.17%; ▌R. H. Thrasher (Republican) 49.72%; ▌James T. Warren (Prohibition) 0.12%
Tennessee 9	Rice A. Pierce	Democratic	1888	Incumbent lost re-election as an Independent Democrat. Democratic hold.	▌ ✓ James C. McDearmon (Democratic) 56.06%; ▌Rice A. Pierce (Ind. Democratic) 42.56%; ▌George W. Bennett (Republican) 1.38%
Tennessee 10	Josiah Patterson	Democratic	1890	Incumbent re-elected.	▌ ✓ Josiah Patterson (Democratic) 71.77%; ▌T. V. Neal (Republican) 28.23%

== Texas ==
District	Incumbent			This race	
District	Member	Party	First elected	Results	Candidates
Texas 1	Charles Stewart	Democratic	1882	Incumbent retired. Democratic hold.	▌ ✓ Joseph C. Hutcheson (Democratic) 59.7%; ▌ J. B. Stephenson (Populist) 25.1%; ▌ Daniel Taylor (Republican) 15.3%
Texas 2	John B. Long	Democratic	1890	Incumbent retired. Democratic hold.	▌ ✓ Samuel B. Cooper (Democratic) 61.4%; ▌ T. A. Wilson (Populist) 31.7%; ▌ W. C. Averill (Republican) 4.7%
Texas 3	Constantine B. Kilgore	Democratic	1886	Incumbent re-elected.	▌ ✓ Constantine B. Kilgore (Democratic) 57.3%; ▌ James M. Perdue (Populist) 42.7%
Texas 4	David B. Culberson	Democratic	1874	Incumbent re-elected.	▌ ✓ David B. Culberson (Democratic) 52.3%; ▌ Pat B. Clark (Populist) 32.8%; ▌ J. A. Hurley (Republican) 14.9%
Texas 5	Joseph W. Bailey	Democratic	1890	Incumbent re-elected.	▌ ✓ Joseph W. Bailey (Democratic) 66.2%; ▌ R. B. Bell (Populist) 21.7%; ▌ John Grant (Republican) 12.1%
Texas 6	Jo Abbott	Democratic	1886	Incumbent re-elected.	▌ ✓ Jo Abbott (Democratic) 59.3%; ▌ Jerome C. Kearby (Populist/Republican) 40.6%
Texas 7	Edwin Le Roy Antony; Redistricted from the 9th district	Democratic	1892	Incumbent retired. Democratic hold.	▌ ✓ George C. Pendleton (Democratic) 56.1%; ▌ Isaac N. Barber (Populist/Republican) 43.8%
Texas 8	S. W. T. Lanham; Redistricted from the 11th district	Democratic	1882	Incumbent retired. Democratic hold.	▌ ✓ Charles K. Bell (Democratic) 54.5%; ▌ Evan Jones (Populist) 39.2%; ▌ C. C. Drake (Republican) 6.1%
Texas 9	Joseph D. Sayers; Redistricted from the 10th district	Democratic	1884	Incumbent re-elected.	▌ ✓ Joseph D. Sayers (Democratic) 61.5%; ▌ J. M. Horner (Populist/Republican) 38.5%
Texas 10	Littleton W. Moore; Redistricted from the 8th district	Democratic	1886	Incumbent retired. Democratic hold.	▌ ✓ Walter Gresham (Democratic) 48.6%; ▌ Alphonse J. Rosenthal (Republican) 35.3%; ▌ Edward O. Meitzn (Populist) 16.1%
Texas 11	William H. Crain; Redistricted from the 7th district	Democratic	1884	Incumbent re-elected.	▌ ✓ William H. Crain (Democratic) 52.4%; ▌ Calvin G. Brewster (Republican) 27.7%; ▌ Ben S. Terrell (Populist) 19.8%
Texas 12	None (New district)			New district. Democratic gain.	▌ ✓ Thomas M. Paschal (Democratic) 50.1%; ▌ Henry Terrell (Republican) 26.2%; ▌ T. J. McMinn (Populist) 23.6%
Texas 13	None (New district)			New district. Democratic gain.	▌ ✓ John H. Stephens (Democratic) 65.5%; ▌ William J. Maltby (Populist) 29.4%; ▌ Adam G. Malloy (Republican) 4.9%

== Vermont ==
District	Incumbent			This race	
District	Member	Party	First elected	Results	Candidates
Vermont 1	H. Henry Powers	Republican	1890	Incumbent re-elected.	▌ ✓ H. Henry Powers (Republican) 65.9%; ▌Felix W. McGettrick (Democratic) 31.9%; ▌Rodney Whittemore (Prohibition) 2.2%
Vermont 2	William W. Grout	Republican	1880; 1882 (lost); 1884	Incumbent re-elected.	▌ ✓ William W. Grout (Republican) 66.6%; ▌George W. Smith (Democratic) 31.1%; ▌William P. Houghton (Prohibition) 2.3%

== Virginia ==
District	Incumbent			This race	
District	Member	Party	First elected	Results	Candidates
Virginia 1	William Atkinson Jones	Democratic	1890	Incumbent re-elected.	▌ ✓ William A. Jones (Democratic) 56.2%; ▌Orres A. Browne (Republican) 43.2%; ▌John W. Elliott (Republican) 0.6%
Virginia 2	John W. Lawson	Democratic	1890	Incumbent retired. Democratic hold.	▌ ✓ David G. Tyler (Democratic) 55.6%; ▌P. C. Garrigan (Republican) 27.4%; ▌John F. Detendorf (Republican) 12.3%; ▌H. S. Collier (Populist) 3.1%; ▌George E. Bowden (Republican) 1.5%
Virginia 3	George D. Wise	Democratic	1880	Incumbent re-elected.	▌ ✓ George D. Wise (Democratic) 63.9%; ▌Walter E. Grant (Republican) 36.1%
Virginia 4	James F. Epes	Democratic	1890	Incumbent re-elected.	▌ ✓ James F. Epes (Democratic) 52.2%; ▌J. Thomas Goode (Republican) 47.8%
Virginia 5	Posey G. Lester	Democratic	1888	Incumbent retired. Democratic hold.	▌ ✓ Claude A. Swanson (Democratic) 53.9%; ▌Benjamin T. Jones (Populist) 46.1%
Virginia 6	Paul C. Edmunds	Democratic	1886	Incumbent re-elected.	▌ ✓ Paul C. Edmunds (Democratic) 58.4%; ▌Thomas E. Cobbs (Populist) 7.2%
Virginia 7	Charles T. O'Ferrall	Democratic	1884	Incumbent re-elected.	▌ ✓ Charles T. O'Ferrall (Democratic) 64.0%; ▌John Lewis (Populist) 36.0%
Virginia 8	Elisha E. Meredith	Democratic	1891 (special)	Incumbent re-elected.	▌ ✓ Elisha E. Meredith (Democratic) 63.0%; ▌B. B. Turner (Populist) 37.0%
Virginia 9	John A. Buchanan	Democratic	1888	Incumbent retired. Democratic hold.	▌ ✓ James W. Marshall (Democratic) 56.1%; ▌Henry C. Wood (Republican) 38.7%; ▌George R. Cowan (Populist) 5.2%
Virginia 10	Henry St. George Tucker	Democratic	1888	Incumbent re-elected.	▌ ✓ Henry St. George Tucker (Democratic) 57.7%; ▌D. Mott Robertson (Populist) 42.3%

== Washington ==
District	Incumbent			This race	
District	Member	Party	First elected	Results	Candidates
Washington at-large (2 seats elected on a general ticket)	John L. Wilson	Republican	1889	Incumbent re-elected.	▌ ✓ William H. Doolittle (Republican) 20.5%; ▌ ✓ John L. Wilson (Republican) 20.4%; ▌ Thomas Carroll (Democratic) 17.7%; ▌ James A. Munday (Democratic) 15.6%; ▌ M. F. Knox (Populist) 11.6%; ▌ J. C. Van Patten (Populist) 11.5%; ▌ D. E. Newberry (Prohibition) 1.4%; ▌ A.C. Dickinson (Prohibition) 1.4%
Washington at-large (2 seats elected on a general ticket)	None (new district)			New seat. Republican gain.	▌ ✓ William H. Doolittle (Republican) 20.5%; ▌ ✓ John L. Wilson (Republican) 20.4%; ▌ Thomas Carroll (Democratic) 17.7%; ▌ James A. Munday (Democratic) 15.6%; ▌ M. F. Knox (Populist) 11.6%; ▌ J. C. Van Patten (Populist) 11.5%; ▌ D. E. Newberry (Prohibition) 1.4%; ▌ A.C. Dickinson (Prohibition) 1.4%

== West Virginia ==
District	Incumbent			This race	
District	Member	Party	First elected	Results	Candidates
West Virginia 1	John O. Pendleton	Democratic	1890	Incumbent re-elected.	▌ ✓ John O. Pendleton (Democratic) 47.57%; ▌Blackburn B. Dovener (Republican) 47.06%; ▌Thomas N. Barnes (Prohibition) 3.66%; ▌Thomas M. Stone (Populist) 1.72%
West Virginia 2	William Lyne Wilson	Democratic	1882	Incumbent re-elected.	▌ ✓ William Lyne Wilson (Democratic) 50.13%; ▌J. Nelson Wisner (Republican) 47.71%; Others: ▌N. W. Fitzgerald (Populist) 1.41%; ▌D. J. Gibson (Prohibition) 0.75%
West Virginia 3	John D. Alderson	Democratic	1888	Incumbent re-elected.	▌ ✓ John D. Alderson (Democratic) 51.28%; ▌Edgar P. Rucker (Republican) 46.88%; Others: ▌V. S. Gates (Populist) 1.15%; ▌W. L. Ellison (Prohibition) 0.70%
West Virginia 4	James Capehart	Democratic	1890	Incumbent re-elected.	▌ ✓ James Capehart (Democratic) 52.36%; ▌Charles T. Caldwell (Republican) 47.41%; ▌Zenas Martin (Populist) 0.24%

== Wisconsin ==
Wisconsin elected ten members of Congress on Election Day, November 8, 1892.

District	Incumbent			This race	
District	Member	Party	First elected	Results	Candidates
Wisconsin 1	Clinton Babbitt	Democratic	1890	Incumbent lost re-election. Republican gain.	▌ ✓ Henry Allen Cooper (Republican) 52.3%; ▌Clinton Babbitt (Democratic) 42.5%; ▌J. C. Murdock (Prohibition) 5.2%
Wisconsin 2	Charles Barwig	Democratic	1888	Incumbent re-elected.	▌ ✓ Charles Barwig (Democratic) 55.9%; ▌Lucien B. Caswell (Republican) 39.4%; ▌George S. Martin (Prohibition) 4.7%
Wisconsin 2	Allen R. Bushnell; Redistricted from 3rd district	Democratic	1890	Incumbent lost re-nomination. Democratic loss.	▌ ✓ Charles Barwig (Democratic) 55.9%; ▌Lucien B. Caswell (Republican) 39.4%; ▌George S. Martin (Prohibition) 4.7%
Wisconsin 3	None (new district)			New seat. Republican gain.	▌ ✓ Joseph W. Babcock (Republican) 50.4%; ▌A. H. Krouskop (Democratic) 42.4%; ▌Josiah Thomas (Prohibition) 4.7%; ▌Ritner Stephenson (Populist) 2.5%
Wisconsin 4	John L. Mitchell	Democratic	1890	Incumbent re-elected.	▌ ✓ John L. Mitchell (Democratic) 50.2%; ▌Theobald Otjen (Republican) 46.8%; ▌Ephraim L. Eaton (Prohibition) 2.1%; ▌Theodore Fritz (Populist) 0.9%
Wisconsin 5	George H. Brickner	Democratic	1888	Incumbent re-elected.	▌ ✓ George H. Brickner (Democratic) 51.7%; ▌Julius Wechselberg (Republican) 46.0%; ▌Marcellus Andier (Prohibition) 2.3%
Wisconsin 6	Lucas M. Miller	Democratic	1890	Incumbent lost re-nomination. Democratic hold.	▌ ✓ Owen A. Wells (Democratic) 51.1%; ▌Emil Baensch (Republican) 45.1%; ▌Charles H. Forward (Prohibition) 2.3%; ▌Peter A. Griffith (Populist) 1.5%
Wisconsin 7	Frank P. Coburn	Democratic	1890	Incumbent lost re-election. Republican gain.	▌ ✓ George B. Shaw (Republican) 48.5%; ▌Frank P. Coburn (Democratic) 41.3%; ▌Ole B. Oleson (Prohibition) 5.2%; ▌David F. Powell (Populist) 5.0%
Wisconsin 8	None (new district)			New seat. Democratic gain.	▌ ✓ Lyman E. Barnes (Democratic) 52.9%; ▌Henry A. Frambach (Republican) 44.1%; ▌John P. Zonne (Prohibition) 3.0%
Wisconsin 9	Thomas Lynch	Democratic	1890	Incumbent re-elected.	▌ ✓ Thomas Lynch (Democratic) 52.2%; ▌Myron H. McCord (Republican) 44.0%; ▌Adolph D. Pergoli (Populist) 3.8%; ▌William D. Badger (Prohibition) 0.1%
Wisconsin 10	Nils P. Haugen; Redistricted from 8th district	Republican	1887	Incumbent re-elected.	▌ ✓ Nils P. Haugen (Republican) 50.6%; ▌Daniel Buchanan Jr. (Democratic) 37.4%; ▌Peter L. Scritsmier (Populist) 12.0%

== Wyoming ==
District	Incumbent			This race	
District	Member	Party	First elected	Results	Candidates
Wyoming at-large	Clarence D. Clark	Republican	1890	Incumbent lost re-election. Democratic gain.	▌ ✓ Henry A. Coffeen (Democratic) 51.34%; ▌Clarence D. Clark (Republican) 48.66%

== Non-voting delegates ==
=== Oklahoma Territory ===
District	Incumbent			This race	
District	Delegate	Party	First elected	Results	Candidates
Oklahoma Territory at-large	David Archibald Harvey	Republican	1890	Incumbent lost renomination. Republican hold.	▌ ✓ Dennis T. Flynn (Republican) 44.52%; ▌Travers (Note: Full name unavailable) (Democratic) 34.62%; ▌Ward (Populist) 20.85%

== See also ==
- 1892 United States elections
  - 1892 United States presidential election
  - 1892–93 United States Senate elections
- 52nd United States Congress
- 53rd United States Congress

== Bibliography ==
- Dubin, Michael J. (March 1, 1998). 1788 United States Congressional Elections-1997: The Official Results of the Elections of the 1st Through 105th Congresses. McFarland and Company. ISBN 978-0786402830.
- Martis, Kenneth C. (January 1, 1989). The Historical Atlas of Political Parties in the United States Congress, 1789-1989. Macmillan Publishing Company. ISBN 978-0029201701.
- Moore, John L., ed. (1994). Congressional Quarterly's Guide to U.S. Elections (Third ed.). Congressional Quarterly Inc. ISBN 978-0871879967.
- "Party Divisions of the House of Representatives* 1789–Present". Office of the Historian, United States House of Representatives.
