= David B. Brunner =

American politician

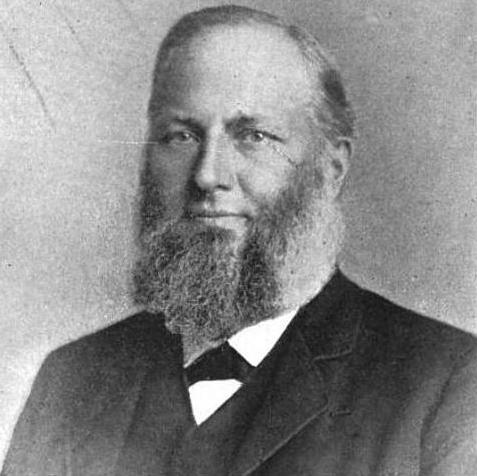

Member of the U.S. House of Representatives from Pennsylvania's 9th district
- In office March 4, 1889 – March 3, 1893
- Preceded by: John A. Hiestand
- Succeeded by: Constantine J. Erdman

Personal details
- Born: March 7, 1835 Amity, Pennsylvania
- Died: November 29, 1903 (aged 68)
- Party: Democratic

David B. Brunner (March 7, 1835 – November 29, 1903) was a Democratic member of the U.S. House of Representatives from Pennsylvania.

== Biography ==
David B. Brunner was born in Amity, Pennsylvania. He attended the common schools and learned the carpenter’s trade. He taught school from 1853 to 1856, during which time he studied the classics. He graduated from Dickinson College in Carlisle, Pennsylvania, in 1860. He served as principal of the Reading Classical Academy in Reading, Pennsylvania, from 1860 to 1869. He established the Reading Business College in 1880.

Brunner was elected as a Democrat to the Fifty-first and Fifty-second Congresses. He was not a candidate for renomination in 1892. He taught at the Reading Business College and died in Reading in 1903 and was interred in Amityville Cemetery. Brunner was also the author of several Pennsylvania German poems, including "Wann ich yuscht en Bauer waer" ("If only I were a farmer").

== Sources ==
- United States Congress. "David B. Brunner (id: B000980)". Biographical Directory of the United States Congress.
- The Political Graveyard

U.S. House of Representatives
Preceded by John A. Hiestand	Member of the U.S. House of Representatives from Pennsylvania's 9th congressional district 1889–1893	Succeeded by Constantine J. Erdman
