= James I. Dungan =

American politician

Irvine Dungan
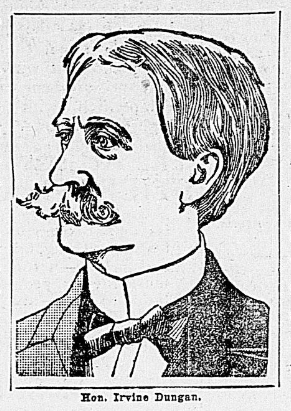
- 1902

Member of the U.S. House of Representatives from Ohio's 13th district
- In office March 4, 1891 – March 3, 1893
- Preceded by: Joseph H. Outhwaite
- Succeeded by: Darius D. Hare

Member of the Ohio Senate from the 7th district
- In office January 7, 1878 – January 4, 1880
- Preceded by: I. T. Monahan
- Succeeded by: John K. Pollard

Personal details
- Born: James Irvine Dunham; May 29, 1844 Canonsburg, Pennsylvania, U.S.
- Died: December 28, 1931 (aged 87) Jackson, Ohio, U.S.
- Resting place: Fairmont Cemetery, Jackson
- Party: Democratic

Military service
- Allegiance: United States
- Branch/service: Union Army
- Unit: 19th Regiment, Iowa Infantry
- Battles/wars: American Civil War

James Irvine Dungan (May 29, 1844 – December 28, 1931) was an American lawyer and politician who served as a U.S. representative from Ohio for one term from 1891 to 1893.

== Early life and career ==
Born in Canonsburg, Washington County, Pennsylvania, Dungan attended the common schools. He received an academic education at the local academy at Denmark, Iowa, and at the college at Washington, Iowa. During the Civil War served as color sergeant in the Nineteenth Regiment, Iowa Volunteer Infantry. He studied law.

=== Early career ===
He was admitted to the bar in 1868 and commenced practice in Jackson, Ohio. Superintendent of schools of Jackson, Ohio, and city and county school examiner, 1867 and 1868.

== Political career ==
He served as mayor of Jackson, 1869. He served as member of the State senate from 1877 to 1879. He served as delegate to the Democratic National Convention, 1880.

=== Congress ===
Dungan was elected as a Democrat to the Fifty-second Congress (March 4, 1891 – March 3, 1893). He was an unsuccessful candidate for reelection to the Fifty-third Congress in 1892.

== Later career and death ==
Attorney in the Interior Department from 1893 to 1895. He returned to Jackson, Ohio, and resumed the practice of law. City solicitor, 1913. He engaged in the practice of his profession until his death in Jackson, Ohio, on December 28, 1931. He was interred in Fairmont Cemetery.

== Sources ==
- United States Congress. "James I. Dungan (id: D000539)". Biographical Directory of the United States Congress.

U.S. House of Representatives
| Preceded by Joseph H. Outhwaite | Member of the U.S. House of Representatives from Ohio's 13th congressional district 1891-1893 | Succeeded by Darius D. Hare |
