= Darius D. Hare =

American politician

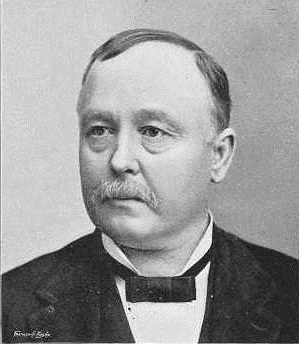

Member of the U.S. House of Representatives from Ohio
- In office March 4, 1891 – March 3, 1895
- Preceded by: Robert P. Kennedy
- Succeeded by: Stephen Ross Harris
- Constituency: 8th district (1891–1893); 13th district (1893–1895)

Personal details
- Born: Darius Dodge Hare; January 9, 1843 Adrian, Ohio, U.S.
- Died: February 10, 1897 (aged 54) Upper Sandusky, Ohio, U.S.
- Resting place: Oak Hill Cemetery, Upper Sandusky
- Party: Democratic
- Education: University of Michigan Law School

Darius Dodge Hare (January 9, 1843 – February 10, 1897) was a Civil War veteran, lawyer, and a two-term U.S. Representative from Ohio from 1891 to 1895.

== Biography ==
Born near Adrian, Ohio, Hare attended the common schools.

=== Civil War ===
During the Civil War, he enlisted in March 1864 as a private in the Signal Corps of the Union Army, and served during the remainder of the conflict. He mustered out of the army in 1865 and returned home.

=== Career after the war ===
After the war, Hare attended the University of Michigan Law School. He was admitted to the bar in September 1867 and commenced practice in Carey, Ohio. He moved to Upper Sandusky, Ohio, in May 1868, and served as the mayor of Upper Sandusky from 1872-82.

=== Congress ===
Hare was elected as a Democrat to the Fifty-second and Fifty-third Congresses (March 4, 1891–March 3, 1895). He declined to be a candidate for renomination in 1894.

== Death ==
He continued the practice of law until his death in Upper Sandusky on February 10, 1897. He was interred in Oak Hill Cemetery.

== See also ==
U.S. House of Representatives
Preceded by Robert P. Kennedy	Member of the U.S. House of Representatives from Ohio's 8th congressional district 1891-1893	Succeeded by Luther M. Strong
Preceded by James I. Dungan	Member of the U.S. House of Representatives from Ohio's 13th congressional district 1893-1895	Succeeded by Stephen R. Harris
