= 1891 United States House of Representatives elections =

There were eight special elections in 1891 in the United States House of Representatives to the 52nd United States Congress.

== List of elections ==
| District | Incumbent | | | This race | |
| District | Member | Party | First elected | Results | Candidates |
|---|---|---|---|---|---|
| New York 10 | Francis B. Spinola | Democratic | 1886 | Incumbent died April 14, 1891. New member elected November 3, 1891 and seated December 7, 1891. Democratic hold. | ▌ ✓ W. Bourke Cockran (Democratic) 63.82%; ▌James E. Townsend (Republican) 34.53%; ▌John Hauser (Socialist Labor) 1.65% |
| Michigan 5 | Melbourne H. Ford | Democratic | 1886 | Incumbent died April 20, 1891. New member elected November 3, 1891 and seated December 7, 1891. Republican gain. | ▌ ✓ Charles E. Belknap (Republican) 44.53%; ▌John S. Lawrence (Democratic) 39.96%; ▌Edward L. Hutchins (Populist) 11.20%; ▌Henry Shultes (Prohibition) 3.51% |
| Tennessee 2 | Leonidas C. Houk | Republican | 1878 | Incumbent died May 25, 1891. New member elected November 21, 1891 and seated December 7, 1891. Republican hold. | ▌ ✓ John C. Houk (Republican) 63.67%; ▌J. C. Williams (Democratic) 35.36% |
| South Dakota at-large | John R. Gamble | Republican | 1890 | Incumbent died August 14, 1891. New member elected November 3, 1891 and seated December 7, 1891. Republican hold. | ▌ ✓ John L. Jolley (Republican) 44.48%; ▌Henry W. Smith (Independent) 37.09%; ▌James M. Wood (Democratic) 18.43% |
| New York 22 | Leslie W. Russell | Democratic | 1890 | Incumbent resigned September 11, 1891 when elected judge of the New York Supreme Court. New member elected November 3, 1891 and seated December 7, 1891. Republican gain. | ▌ ✓ Newton M. Curtis (Republican) 54.75%; ▌Wilbur E. Porter (Democratic) 41.36%; ▌Alonzo M. Leffingwell (Prohibition) 3.89% |
| New York 12 | Roswell P. Flower | Democratic | 1881 (special); 1882 (retired); 1888 | Incumbent resigned September 16, 1891 to run for Governor of New York. New member elected November 3, 1891 and seated December 7, 1891. Democratic hold. | ▌ ✓ Joseph J. Little (Democratic) (Note: "Tammany" in source) 58.60%; ▌William McMichael (Republican) 34.47%; ▌David DeVenny (New York County Democracy) 4.16%; ▌John J. Flick (Socialist Labor) 2.76% |
| New York 2 | David A. Boody | Democratic | 1890 | Incumbent resigned October 13, 1891, to run for Mayor of Brooklyn. New member elected November 3, 1891 and seated December 7, 1891. Democratic hold. | ▌ ✓ Alfred C. Chapin (Democratic) 52.76; ▌Henry Bristow (Republican) 47.25% |
| Virginia 8 | W. H. F. Lee | Democratic | 1886 | Incumbent died October 15, 1891. New member elected December 9, 1891 and seated December 23, 1891. Democratic hold. | ▌ ✓ Elisha E. Meredith (Democratic) 67.82%; ▌John A. Brooks (Republican) 32.18% |
