= Constantine J. Erdman =

American politician

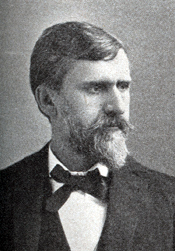

Member of the U.S. House of Representatives from Pennsylvania's 9th district
- In office March 4, 1893 – March 3, 1897
- Preceded by: David B. Brunner
- Succeeded by: Daniel Ermentrout

Personal details
- Born: September 4, 1846 Upper Saucon Township, Pennsylvania, U.S.
- Died: January 15, 1911 (aged 64) Allentown, Pennsylvania, U.S.
- Party: Democratic
- Education: Pennsylvania College

Constantine Jacob Erdman (September 4, 1846 – January 15, 1911) was a Democratic member of the U.S. House of Representatives from Pennsylvania.

== Biography ==
Constantine J. Erdman (grandson of Jacob Erdman) was born in Upper Saucon Township, Pennsylvania, near Allentown, Pennsylvania. He attended the common schools of the district and a classical school in Quakertown, Pennsylvania. He graduated from Pennsylvania College in Gettysburg, Pennsylvania, in 1865. He studied law, was admitted to the bar in 1867 and practiced in Allentown. He was elected district attorney in 1874. He served as adjutant of the Fourth Regiment, Pennsylvania National Guard, during the riots at Reading, Pennsylvania, in 1877.

Erdman was elected as a Democrat to the Fifty-third and Fifty-fourth Congresses. He was not a candidate for reelection in 1896. He resumed the practice of law in Allentown. He served as a trustee of Muhlenberg College at Allentown. He was president of the Coplay Cement Manufacturing Co., the Allentown & Coopersburg Turnpike Co., and the Allen Fire Insurance Co. for many years. He died in Allentown in 1911 and was interred in Fairview Cemetery.

== Sources ==
- United States Congress. "Constantine J. Erdman (id: E000199)". Biographical Directory of the United States Congress.
- The Political Graveyard

U.S. House of Representatives
Preceded by David B. Brunner	Member of the U.S. House of Representatives from Pennsylvania's 9th congressional district 1893–1897	Succeeded by Daniel Ermentrout
