= John T. Cutting =

American politician

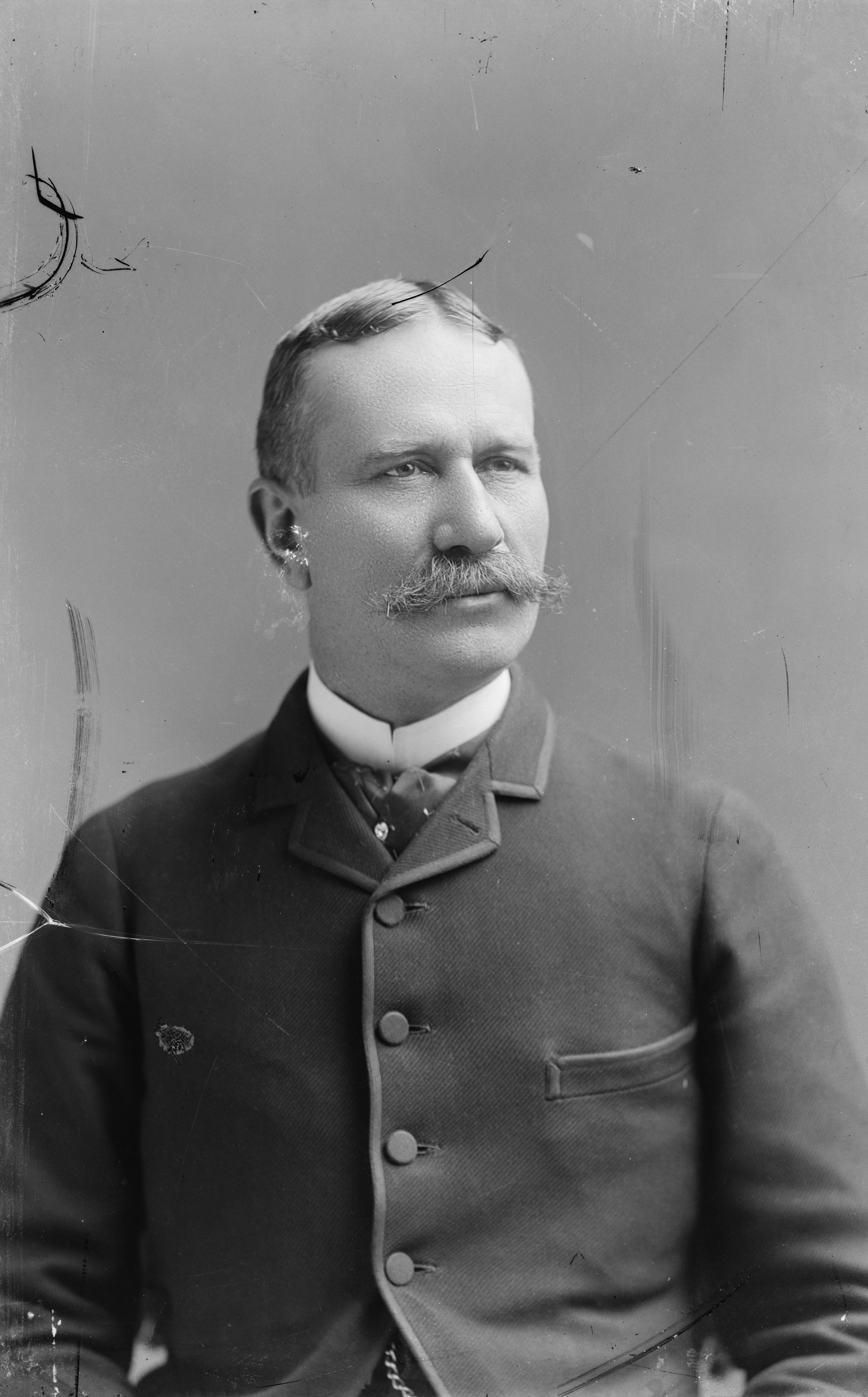
- Portrait by C. M. Bell, c. 1891–1893

Member of the U.S. House of Representatives from California's 4th district
- In office March 4, 1891 – March 3, 1893
- Preceded by: William W. Morrow
- Succeeded by: James G. Maguire

Personal details
- Born: John Tyler Cutting; September 7, 1844 Westport, New York, U.S.
- Died: November 24, 1911 (aged 67) Toronto, Ontario, Canada
- Resting place: Hillside Cemetery

John Tyler Cutting (September 7, 1844 – November 24, 1911) was an American Civil War veteran who served one term as a U.S. representative from California from 1891 to 1893,

== Biography ==
Born in Westport, New York, Cutting was left an orphan at ten years of age, when he journeyed westward. He lived in Wisconsin and Illinois from 1855 to 1861. During these years he worked on a farm. During the later part of this period he was employed as a clerk in a store for a few years while he attended public schools in Illinois.

=== Military service ===
Cutting enlisted in Taylor's Chicago Battery at the outbreak of the American Civil War and served until July 20, 1862. He then reenlisted on January 4, 1864, in the Chicago Mercantile Battery, in which he served until the close of the war.

Cutting moved to California in 1877 and established a wholesale fruit and commission business. He was a member of the National Guard of California, and subsequently assisted in the organization of the Coast Guard, of which he later became brigadier general in command of the Second Brigade. His staff surgeon was future governor George Pardee.

=== Congress ===
Cutting was elected as a Republican to the Fifty-second Congress (March 4, 1891 – March 3, 1893). He declined to be a candidate for renomination in 1892.

=== Later career ===
In 1894 Cutting settled in New York City, where he became connected with the automobile industry. He retired to Westport, New York, in 1907.

=== Death and burial ===
He died in Toronto, Ontario, Canada, November 24, 1911. He was interred in Hillside Cemetery, Westport, New York.

== Electoral results ==
Robert Ferral, Cutting's Democratic Party opponent in the 1890 election

1890 United States House of Representatives elections
Party	Candidate	Votes	%
Republican	John Tyler Cutting	13,196	49.2
Democratic	Robert Ferral	12,091	45.1
American Party	Thomas V. Cator	1,492	5.6
Prohibition	Joseph Rowell	50	0.2
Total votes		26,829	100.0
Turnout			
Republican hold			

U.S. House of Representatives
Preceded by William W. Morrow	Member of the U.S. House of Representatives from California's 4th congressional district 1891–1893	Succeeded by James G. Maguire
