= Joseph H. Outhwaite =

American politician (1841–1907)

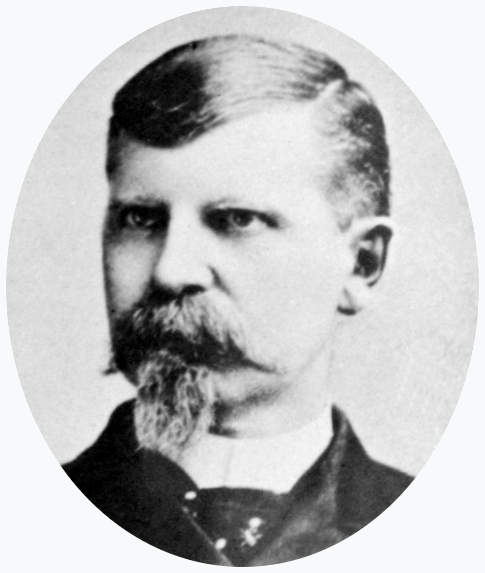

Member of the U.S. House of Representatives from Ohio
- In office March 4, 1885 – March 3, 1895
- Preceded by: George L. Converse
- Succeeded by: David K. Watson
- Constituency: 13th district (1885–1891); 9th district (1891–1893); 12th district (1893–1895)

3rd Dean of Moritz College of Law
- In office 1905–1907
- Preceded by: William F. Hunter
- Succeeded by: George W. Rightmire

Personal details
- Born: Joseph Hodson Outhwaite; December 5, 1841 Cleveland, Ohio, U.S.
- Died: December 9, 1907 (aged 66) Columbus, Ohio, U.S.
- Resting place: Green Lawn Cemetery
- Party: Democratic
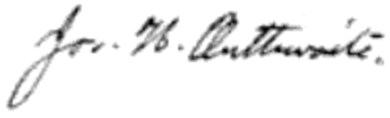
- Signature

Joseph Hodson Outhwaite (December 5, 1841 – December 9, 1907) was an American educator, lawyer and politician who served five terms as a U.S. representative from Ohio from 1885 to 1895.

== Early life and career ==
Born in Cleveland, Ohio, Outhwaite attended the public schools of Zanesville, Ohio. He taught in Zanesville's high school from 1862 to 1864. Outhwaite was principal of a grammar school in Columbus, Ohio from 1864 to 1867, studying law while teaching.

He was admitted to the bar in 1866 and practiced from 1867 to 1871 at Osceola, Missouri. He served as prosecuting attorney of Franklin County, Ohio from 1874 to 1878.

Starting in 1879 he was trustee of the county children's home, continuing until he was appointed trustee of the fund of the city of Columbus in 1883, staying there until 1889.

== Congress ==
Outhwaite was elected as a Democrat to the Forty-ninth and to the four succeeding Congresses (March 4, 1885 – March 3, 1895). He served as chairman of the Committee on Pacific Railroads (Fiftieth Congress), Committee on Military Affairs (Fifty-second and Fifty-third Congresses). He was appointed a member of the commission to codify the laws of the United States.

== Later career and death ==
Outhwaite was Dean of the law school at Ohio State University from 1904 until his death in Columbus on December 9, 1907. He is interred in Green Lawn Cemetery.

== Sources ==
- United States Congress. "Joseph H. Outhwaite (id: O000136)". Biographical Directory of the United States Congress.

U.S. House of Representatives
| Preceded by George L. Converse | United States Representative from Ohio's 13th congressional district March 4, 1885-March 3, 1891 | Succeeded by James I. Dungan |
| Preceded by William C. Cooper | United States Representative from Ohio's 9th congressional district March 4, 1891-March 3, 1893 | Succeeded by Byron F. Ritchie |
| Preceded by William H. Enochs | United States Representative from Ohio's 12th congressional district March 4, 1893-March 3, 1895 | Succeeded by David K. Watson |
