= William J. Oliver (industrialist) =

American industrialist (1867–1925)

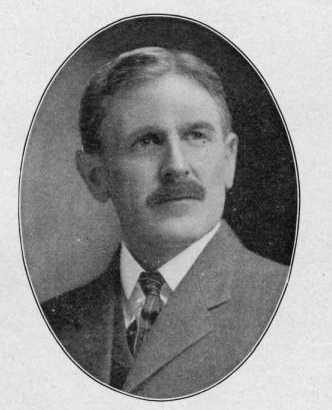
- Born: January 13, 1867; Mishawaka, Indiana, United States
- Died: March 28, 1925 (aged 58); Knoxville, Tennessee, United States
- Resting place: Greenwood Cemetery; Knoxville, Tennessee
- Political party: Republican
- Spouse: Blanche O'Brien

William Jesse Oliver (January 13, 1867 – March 28, 1925) was an American industrialist who operated one of the nation's most successful contracting firms in the early 20th century. He built several hundred miles of railroad in the Southern Appalachian region during the 1890s and early 1900s, and opened the Southern United States' largest privately owned manufacturing plant in 1905. He submitted the initial winning bid for the construction of the Panama Canal in 1907, though the bid was eventually rejected.

Along with industrial endeavors, Oliver was engaged in civic and political affairs in his adopted hometown of Knoxville, Tennessee. He made national headlines in 1908 when he seized control of the Tennessee Republican Party convention, and had himself and several supporters elected to various party positions. He served as president of Knoxville's Appalachian Exposition in 1910.

== Early life ==
Oliver was born in Mishawaka, Indiana, to Henry and Clara Oliver. He was a nephew of James Oliver (1823–1908), an inventor and manufacturer known for the chilled plow, which William's firm would later market. William attended public schools in Mishawaka and nearby South Bend. When he was 16, his father suffered a serious financial setback, forcing William to leave home to find work. He was hired as a bookkeeper for a railroad contractor, and had risen to foreman within a few years.

At the age of 23, Oliver formed a 15-team outfit that won a railroad grading contract for the Cotton Belt Railroad, and managed to finish the project at a profit. His company, W.J. Oliver and Company, based in Langley, South Carolina, aggressively sought regional railroad construction contracts throughout the 1890s. He won a contract to build the Pickens Railway, connecting Easley, South Carolina with Pickens, South Carolina, in 1897, and completed a 25-mile (40 km) extension of the Seaboard Railroad from Richmond, Virginia, to Ridgeway, North Carolina, the following year. In 1899, his company won contracts for the Sumter and Wateree River Railroad in South Carolina and an extension of the Southern Railway in the vicinity of Augusta, Georgia. In 1902, Oliver's company landed a million-dollar contract to build the stretch of the Tennessee Central Railroad between Nashville, Tennessee, and Clarksville, Tennessee.

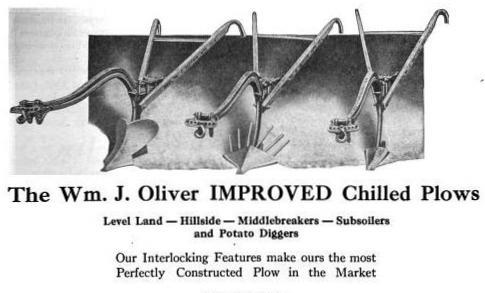
Ad for the William J. Oliver Chilled Plow; Oliver's uncle, James Oliver, invented the chilled plow

As Oliver's company grew, he sought to relocate to a more central location. On the advice of Samuel Spencer, president of the Southern Railway, he moved his company to Knoxville, Tennessee, in 1903. In September 1904, he organized the William J. Oliver Manufacturing Company, which built a massive machineworks on Dale Avenue in Knoxville. Described as the largest of its kind in the South, this plant produced railroad, mining and construction equipment, as well as metal castings and foundry supplies.

During this period, Oliver was recognized as a specialist in concrete construction, and was described by one newspaper as "the most successful concrete contractor in America." His company constructed railroad bridges around the region, as well as buildings in Louisville and Nashville, the Clinch Avenue Viaduct in Knoxville, and the Portland Cement Company plant in Cumberland Gap, Tennessee. In 1905, Oliver landed a major contract to build Hales Bar Dam, the first hydroelectric dam to span the Tennessee River. After two years and persistent cost overruns, however, he was forced to abandon the project.

By 1907, Oliver's company held $30 million in contracts, and had built hundreds of miles of railroad tracks. One of his most ambitious railroad projects was the Southern's Stevenson extension, which aimed to connect Chattanooga with Stevenson, Alabama. The extension required the construction of a 3,537-foot (1,078 m) tunnel through Lookout Mountain. Completed in 1908, the tunnel was described by one newspaper as "one of the biggest feats in railroading in the south."

== Panama Canal bid ==
When the United States government announced it would be hiring a contractor to build the Panama Canal, Oliver sent agents to Panama to investigate for a possible bid. He formed a partnership with New York-area contractor Anson Bangs, and the two compiled a bid of 6.75% of the canal's construction cost (the construction cost had been estimated as high as $465 million). When bids were opened on January 12, 1907, Oliver's bid was the lowest of the four submitted, slightly lower than George Pierce and Company's bid of 7.19%, and easily ahead of the bids submitted by MacArthur-Gillespie (12.5%) and the North American Dredging Company (28%).

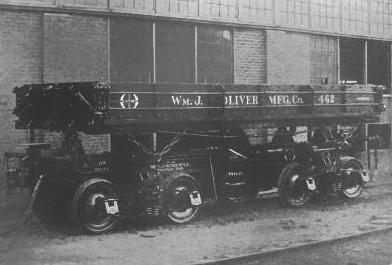
William J. Oliver Manufacturing Company dump car used in the construction of the Panama Canal

President Theodore Roosevelt initially accepted Oliver's bid, though Bangs was eliminated from the partnership due to a conflict of interest. Oliver was given ten days to organize a corporation and raise $5 million, a feat he accomplished in just three. He obtained the assistance of New York City Subway builder John B. MacDonald, New York Superintendent of Public Works Frederick C. Stevens, and the Milan Dredging Company of Baltimore. He stated he would personally travel to Panama to supervise the project.

John Frank Stevens, who had been overseeing the canal's construction since 1905, vehemently opposed turning the project over to Oliver. In a message wired to Secretary of War William Howard Taft, Stevens stated Oliver lacked the "nature, experience, or achievement" necessary to complete such a massive project. He also stated that canal construction crews disliked Oliver, and expressed concern over racial comments Oliver had made in various interviews (Oliver had said he would employ primarily Southern black laborers, considering them better workers than those from the West Indies or China).

Roosevelt and Taft initially dismissed Stevens' concerns, but by the end of February 1907, the administration had decided not to use a contractor to build the canal (the abrupt resignation of Stevens may have influenced Roosevelt's decision). Oliver stated he had been "whangdoodled" by Roosevelt. MacDonald blamed the transcontinental railroads for the decision, arguing they had been trying to thwart the canal's construction. Though the government had decided against giving the canal contract to Oliver, he did receive a contract for 500 steel dump cars to be used on the canal project.

== 1908 Republican state convention ==
Throughout the 1890s and early 1900s, Tennessee's Republican Party was bitterly divided between two factions: one led by ex-Congressman Henry Clay Evans, and the other led by 1st district Congressman Walter P. Brownlow. Oliver, like most Knoxville businessmen, supported Brownlow. The Brownlow faction controlled the party until 1904, when Evans ally Nathan W. Hale defeated Brownlow's lieutenant Richard W. Austin for the 2nd district congressional seat, and Evans' associates gained control of the Republican state committee.

As the 1908 campaign season opened, the Brownlow faction wanted Tennessee's seat on the Republican National Committee to go to Oliver, while Evans wanted it to go to Hale. The Evans faction dominated Republican county conventions that year, winning most of the delegates to the party's March 1908 state convention in Nashville. With Brownlow ill and Austin out of the country, a frustrated Oliver decided to take matters into his own hands. He recruited around 800 Knoxville-area ruffians, armed them with pistols and hatchets, and transported them via train to Nashville. The mob burst into the Tennessee State Capitol several hours before the convention was scheduled to begin, overpowered the guards, and promptly opened the convention proceedings. After Oliver delivered a "red-hot speech" trashing Evans and Hale, he was "elected" national committeeman, and his associates were chosen as delegates to the 1908 Republican National Convention.

The Evans faction, led by Evans' chief ally (and future U.S. Senator) Newell Sanders, arrived at the capitol at the hour the convention was scheduled to begin. Finding Oliver's men in control of the proceedings, a "battle royal" ensued, with delegates exchanging punches and throwing chairs and other stray objects at one another. Using "regular football tactics," the Evans men managed to push their way onto the platform, but were promptly accosted by Oliver's henchmen. Sanders, his "coat and hat gone, his shirt split and ragged, and even his trousers badly disarranged," was carried out onto the veranda and nearly thrown over the side. Future congressman Sam R. Sells, an Evans ally, was thrown off the platform and struck with a chair.

After a few hours, the Nashville police arrived to restore order, and left Oliver in control of the convention. The following day, the Evans faction held its own convention and elected its own slate of delegates, including Hale as national committeeman. When both sets of delegates arrived at the Republican National Convention later that year, the national committee, after learning of Oliver's actions, awarded the state's committee seat to Hale, and awarded most of the convention seats to the Evans delegates.

Oliver remained active in Republican Party politics in subsequent years, mainly as a supporter of Theodore Roosevelt. During the 1912 presidential election, he led statewide organizational efforts for Roosevelt's Progressive Party.

== Appalachian Exposition of 1910 ==
Oliver had been promoting Knoxville as a burgeoning New South economy since his arrival in the city in 1903. He was consistently frustrated, however, by the city's business and political leaders, who tended to be hostile or apathetic toward progressivism. Oliver suggested that Knoxville had the immediate natural resources to become the "great manufacturing city of the South," and argued the city was being held back by the business community's unwillingness to make risky, long-term investments. He once stated that "conservatism belongs to the man who has money invested in government bonds, and only has sufficient brains to play ping-pong."

Seeing the benefits that large-scale expositions had brought to other cities, Oliver teamed up with journalist William Goodman, who had been using his position as secretary of the Knoxville Commercial Club to try and organize such a grand exposition in Knoxville since 1900. After a massive publicity campaign, the Commercial Club finally embraced the idea in 1908. The club organized the Appalachian Exposition Company, and appointed Oliver president. The company raised $100,000 for the venture.

The exposition took place at Chilhowee Park from September 12, 1910, to October 12, 1910. Its purpose was to showcase the region's commerce and industry, as well as promote the responsible use of the region's natural resources. The fair was a resounding success, earning a 140% return on the $100,000 invested. After it concluded, city leaders immediately began organizing a second fair for 1911. Colonel Lawrence D. Tyson succeeded Oliver as president.

== Later life ==
In 1907, Oliver established what would eventually become the Smoky Mountain Railroad, but was initially named the Knoxville, Sevierville and Eastern Railway. The railroad was organized in hopes of providing a more direct route from Knoxville to North Carolina via Sevierville and Gatlinburg. Construction on the initial phase of the railroad, which connected the South Knoxville neighborhood of Vestal with Sevierville, began in June 1908, and was completed by January 1910. The railroad struggled financially, however, and construction stalled. Sevier County eventually seized control of the railroad, arguing Oliver had manipulated the stock.

During World War I, Oliver's Knoxville factory manufactured artillery shells. The factory received an order for 100,000 shells from the Italian army shortly after the war began. After the U.S. entered the war, the factory received an order for 130,000 shells from the U.S. Armed Forces.

In 1916, the International Association of Machinists attempted to unionize Oliver's factory in Knoxville, leading to a lockout. In July of that year, labor activist Joseph Gilmour organized a rally at the factory. According to a report issued by Gilmour, he was met at the rally by Oliver and about fifty "strike-breaking thugs and officials." Gilmour stated that as he tried to speak, Oliver's men blasted him with a fire hose, and afterward attacked him and knocked him unconscious.

In October 1918, federal authorities seized Oliver's factory, and he and nine subordinates were arrested and charged with sabotage, fraud, and conspiracy to defraud the government for manufacturing defective artillery shells. Though the charges were later dismissed, Oliver's company was forced into bankruptcy, and he never recovered financially.

In 1920, Oliver was badly injured when he was hit by a truck near his home on Kingston Pike in Knoxville, and never fully recovered. He died at his home on March 28, 1925. He was buried in the city's Greenwood Cemetery.
