= Becky Duncan Massey =

American politician (born 1955)

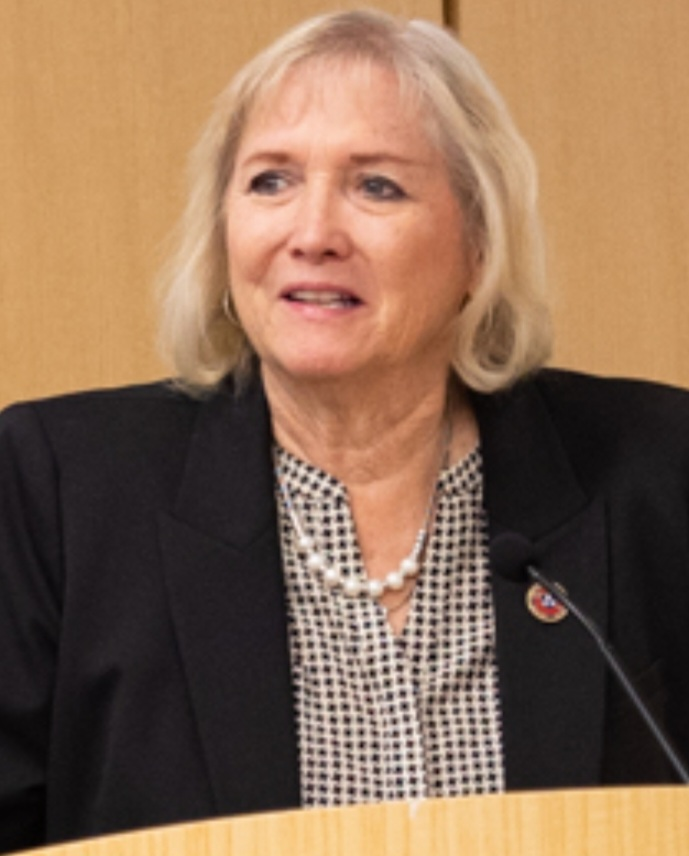
- Massey in 2022

Member of the Tennessee Senate from the 6th district
- Incumbent
- Assumed office November 20, 2011
- Preceded by: Sue Atchley

Personal details
- Born: Becky Duncan; January 2, 1955 (age 71) Knoxville, Tennessee, U.S.
- Party: Republican
- Spouse: Morton Massey
- Children: 2
- Relatives: John Duncan (father); Jimmy Duncan (brother)
- Education: University of Tennessee (BS)
- Website: Senate website Campaign website

Becky Duncan Massey (born January 2, 1955) is a Republican member of the Tennessee Senate for the 6th district, encompassing Knoxville and Knox County.

== Biography ==
=== Early life and education ===
Becky Duncan Massey was born on January 2, 1955. Her father was John Duncan, Sr., Mayor of Knoxville from 1959 to 1964, and a U.S. Representative for Tennessee's 2nd congressional district from 1965 to 1988. Her elder brother, Jimmy, was elected to this same district after their father’s death in 1988. He served in Congress thru 2018. Their uncle, Joe D. Duncan, was a former Tennessee Court of Criminal Appeals Judge. She received a Bachelor of Science in Business Administration from the University of Tennessee at Knoxville in 1977. She is a member of Alpha Omicron Pi, a women's fraternity.

== Politician ==
She served as a delegate to the 1988 Republican National Convention. In November 2011, she was elected to the sixth district in the Tennessee Senate, after Republican senator Jamie Woodson resigned. She defeated Democratic candidate Gloria Johnson with 64 percent of the vote. She was reelected in 2012, 2016. 2020 and 2024. She Chairs the Senate Transportation and Safety Committee and also serves on the Senate Health and General Welfare Committee.

== Personal life ==
Massey is married to Morton Massey, a retired software developer, and they have two daughters, a son-in-law, and two grandchildren. She attends a Presbyterian church, New Life Gathering.

=== Executive ===
She is the former executive director of the Sertoma Center, a company that provides residential and day services to individuals with intellectual and developmental disabilities in Knoxville.

=== Board memberships ===
Massey is Past-President of the Tennessee Community Organizations, and a board member of Habitat Tennessee, Tennova Healthcare, the UT College of Nursing and the National Conference of State Legislatures. She is a former board member of the Dogwood Arts Festival, Overlook Mental Health Center, and Big Brothers Big Sisters.
