= Richard W. Austin =

American politician, attorney and diplomat

Richard Wilson Austin
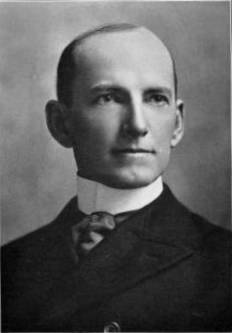

Member of the U.S. House of Representatives from Tennessee's 2nd district
- In office March 4, 1909 – March 3, 1919
- Preceded by: Nathan W. Hale
- Succeeded by: J. Will Taylor

Personal details
- Born: August 26, 1857 Decatur, Alabama, US
- Died: April 20, 1919 (aged 61) Washington, D.C., US
- Resting place: Old Gray Cemetery; Knoxville, Tennessee, U.S.
- Party: Republican
- Spouse: Margaret Morrison (m. 1882)
- Education: University of Tennessee
- Profession: Attorney, editor, diplomat
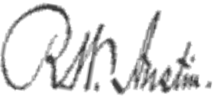
- Signature

Richard Wilson Austin (August 26, 1857 – April 20, 1919) was an American politician, attorney and diplomat. A Republican, he served in the United States House of Representatives from 1909 to 1919, representing Tennessee's 2nd district. Prior to his congressional tenure, he worked as a United States Marshal from 1897 to 1906, and served as the U.S. consul to Glasgow, Scotland, from 1906 to 1907.

== Early life ==
Austin was born on August 26, 1857, in Decatur, Alabama, the son of John and Mary (Parker) Austin. He attended public schools in Loudon County, Tennessee, and studied law at the University of Tennessee. He was admitted to the bar in 1878, and commenced practice in Knoxville, Tennessee.

Austin served as a clerk in the Post Office Department at Washington, D.C., from 1879 to 1881. He worked as Assistant Doorkeeper of the United States House of Representatives under his future political ally, Walter P. Brownlow, from 1881 to 1883, during the Forty-seventh Congress. He was a special agent of the War Department from 1883 to 1885. In 1885, he engaged in newspaper work in Knoxville. He then returned to Decatur, Alabama, and continued the practice of law. He was the private secretary of Congressman Leonidas C. Houk from Tennessee in 1888, and was the city attorney of Decatur, Alabama.

Austin ran for Alabama's 8th district seat in the U.S. House of Representatives in 1890, but lost to the incumbent, former Confederate general Joseph Wheeler, 16,821 votes to 12,076. He was a delegate to the 1892 Republican National Convention at Minneapolis. He returned to Knoxville in 1893 to edit the Knoxville Republican.

Following the death of Leonidas Houk in 1891, the Tennessee Republican Party gradually split into two quarreling factions: one led by Brownlow, which Austin supported, and the other led by former congressman Henry Clay Evans of Chattanooga, which had the support of Chattanooga businessman Newell Sanders. At the 1896 Republican National Convention, Austin and Brownlow helped thwart Evans' bid for the vice presidential nomination. Brownlow was elected to Congress by the 1st district later that year. The president considered Evans for the office of Postmaster General, but the appointment went to James A. Gary of Maryland, due in part to the influence of Brownlow and Austin.

In 1897, President McKinley appointed Austin United States Marshal for the Eastern District of Tennessee. One of the more notable actions of Austin as marshal came in June 1903, when he organized an unsuccessful effort to recapture outlaw Kid Curry, who had escaped from a Knoxville jail.

Austin ran for Tennessee's 2nd district congressional seat in 1904, but was defeated in the primary by Nathan W. Hale, who had the support of the Evans-Sanders block. In 1906, Austin was appointed United States consul at Glasgow, Scotland. He remained at this post until November 1907, when he resigned and returned to Tennessee to mount another congressional campaign.

== Congress ==
In 1908, the quarrel between the Evans-Sanders and Brownlow-Austin factions intensified when powerful Knoxville businessman William J. Oliver, a friend of Brownlow and Austin, led a band of armed ruffians to the state party's convention in Nashville, where they beat up Sanders and chased away his supporters. Determined to defeat Hale, the Brownlow faction aligned itself with the Malcolm Patterson faction of the state's Democratic Party, which was facing a similar rift between supporters of Patterson and supporters of his gubernatorial opponent, Edward W. Carmack. The Brownlow Republicans offered to vote for Patterson for governor, and in return, Patterson Democrats would vote for Austin in the 2nd district congressional election. With this support, Austin edged Hale on election day, 15,337 votes to 14,528.

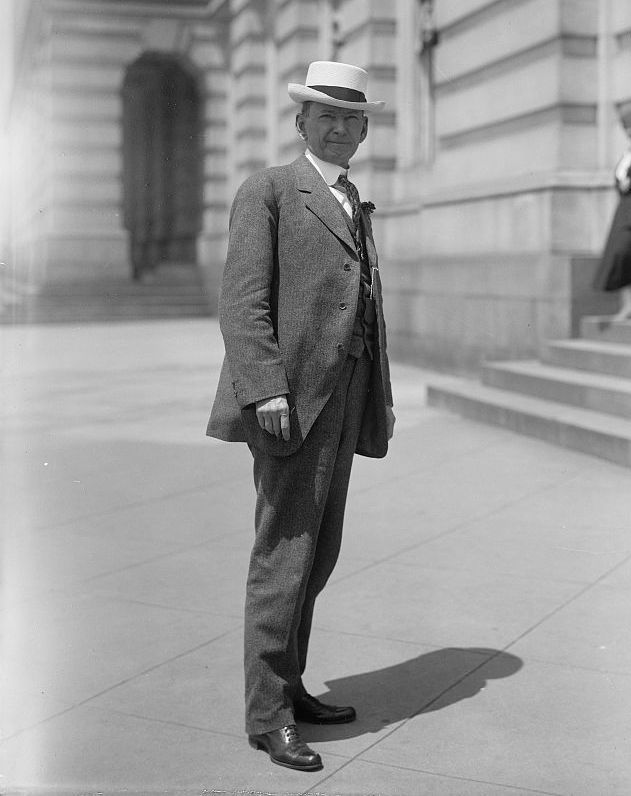
Congressman Austin, photographed by Harris & Ewing in 1914

Incensed, Hale and his supporters attempted unsuccessfully to prevent Austin from caucusing with House Republicans. John Chiles Houk, who generally supported the Evans-Sanders faction, convinced Patterson to abandon his support for Austin and Brownlow. This move proved untimely, however, as Patterson's popularity plummeted due to his actions in the aftermath of the Cooper-Carmack shootout. Though Hale had the support of Houk and the influential Knoxville Journal, Austin had the support of President William Howard Taft. Following a savage campaign in 1910, Austin again defeated Hale, this time by a margin of 15,761 votes to 11,755.

In 1912, Republicans were again divided, with some remaining loyal to Taft, and others throwing their support behind Theodore Roosevelt and the Progressive Party ticket. In the 2nd district congressional election, Austin remained loyal to Taft and ran on the Republican ticket. W. H. Buttram, who had the support of John Chiles Houk and Knoxville attorney Hugh B. Lindsay, ran on the Progressive ticket. J.C.J. Williams ran as a Democrat. Though Roosevelt outpolled Taft in the 2nd district, Austin was easily reelected, garnering 12,712 votes to 7,025 for Buttram, and 6,681 for Williams.

Austin was easily reelected in 1914 and 1916. At the 1916 Republican National Convention, he openly squabbled with ex-Governor Ben W. Hooper (a Sanders ally) over the state's delegate to the national committee. The persistent enmity of Houk, Sanders and Hooper finally took its toll in the March 1918 Republican primary, when Austin was defeated for the nomination by state party chairman J. Will Taylor.

During his five terms in Congress, Austin, a Taft ally, generally supported protectionist measures, such as tariffs on foreign imports. In February 1911, Austin delivered a memorial address on the House floor for Brownlow, who had died the previous year. In 1915, he supported a national exchange system that would help match job seekers with employers looking for help. During the House debate on the 19th Amendment in January 1918, Austin, referring to Congressman Jeannette Rankin of Montana, argued, "The highest, best, and strongest evidence that women's suffrage is a success has been established in this House by the enviable record made by our colleague from Montana, who has won the respect, confidence, and admiration of the members and officials of this House."

== Death ==
Austin died in Washington, D.C., on April 20, 1919, just over a month after the end of his final congressional term. He is interred at Old Gray Cemetery in Knoxville, Tennessee.

U.S. House of Representatives
Preceded by Nathan W. Hale	Member of the U.S. House of Representatives from Tennessee's 2nd congressional district 1909-1919	Succeeded by J. Will Taylor
