= Tennessee's 6th Senate district =

American legislative district

Tennessee's 6th State Senate district
Senator
Becky Duncan Massey; R–Knoxville
- Demographics: 82% White; 9% Black; 3% Hispanic; 2% Asian; 2% Multiracial
- Population (2022): 204,974

Tennessee's 6th Senate district is one of 33 districts in the Tennessee Senate. It has been represented by Republican Becky Duncan Massey since a 2011 special election to replace fellow Republican Jamie Woodson.

== Geography ==
District 6 covers the southern and eastern half of Knox County, including parts of Knoxville as well as nearby suburbs such as Mascot.

The district is located entirely within Tennessee's 2nd congressional district, and overlaps with the 13th, 14th, 15th, 16th, 18th, and 19th districts of the Tennessee House of Representatives.

== Recent election results ==
Senators in Tennessee serve staggered four-year terms, with elections for odd-numbered districts occurring during midterm years and those for even-numbered districts taking place during presidential election years.

=== 2020 ===
2020 Tennessee Senate election, District 6
Primary election
Party	Candidate	Votes	%
Democratic	Jane George	7,738	63.9
Democratic	Sam Brown	4,375	36.1
Total votes		12,113	100
General election
Republican	Becky Duncan Massey (incumbent)	61,286	63.1
Democratic	Jane George	35,785	36.9
Total votes		97,071	100
Republican hold			

=== 2016 ===
2016 Tennessee Senate election, District 6
Party	Candidate	Votes	%
Republican	Becky Duncan Massey (incumbent)	62,688	100
Total votes		62,688	100
Republican hold			

=== 2012 ===
2012 Tennessee Senate election, District 6
Party	Candidate	Votes	%
Republican	Becky Duncan Massey (incumbent)	49,744	68.7
Democratic	Evelyn Gill	22,691	31.3
Total votes		72,435	100
Republican hold			

=== Federal and statewide results ===
Year	Office	Results
2020	President	Trump 57.9 – 40.1%
2016	President	Trump 60.0 – 34.6%
2012	President	Romney 64.0 – 34.3%
2012	Senate	Corker 70.6 – 23.0%
