= John Duncan Sr. =

American politician (1919–1988)

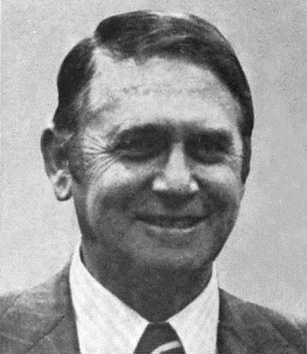

Member of the U.S. House of Representatives from Tennessee's 2nd district
- In office January 3, 1965 – June 21, 1988
- Preceded by: Irene Baker
- Succeeded by: Jimmy Duncan

Mayor of Knoxville
- In office 1959–1964
- Preceded by: Cas Walker (acting)
- Succeeded by: Robert L. Crossley (acting)

Personal details
- Born: John James Duncan; March 24, 1919 Huntsville, Tennessee
- Died: June 21, 1988 (aged 69) Knoxville, Tennessee
- Resting place: Duncan Family Cemetery; Scott County, Tennessee
- Party: Republican
- Spouse: Lois Swisher
- Children: 4, including Jimmy
- Education: University of Tennessee (BA); Cumberland University (LLB)
- Occupation: attorney

Military service
- Branch/service: United States Army
- Years of service: 1942–1945

John James Duncan Sr. (March 24, 1919 – June 21, 1988) was an American attorney and Republican politician who represented Tennessee's 2nd congressional district in the U. S. House of Representatives from 1965 until his death in 1988. He also served as Mayor of Knoxville, Tennessee, from 1959 to 1964, and as assistant attorney general of Knox County, from 1948 until 1956. He is the father of Congressman John J. "Jimmy" Duncan Jr., who succeeded him in Congress, and current Tennessee State Senator Becky Duncan Massey.

== Early life ==
Duncan was born in Huntsville, Tennessee, the sixth of ten children of Cassie (Lee) and Flem Baird Duncan. After completing grade school in the Huntsville area and Hunstville High School, he won a $25 scholarship from Sears-Roebuck. He enrolled in the University of Tennessee in 1939, and graduated with a Bachelor of Science two years later.

Following the outbreak of World War II he joined the United States Army, serving from May 1942 to December 1945. While in the army, he served as a special agent in the Security and Intelligence Division with the same paygrade as a master sergeant. After the war, Duncan enrolled in Cumberland University's law school, from which he graduated in June 1947. He became the state commander of the American Legion in 1954.

== Political career ==
=== Knox County prosecutor ===
Following his graduation, Duncan returned to Knoxville, where he had accepted a position as assistant attorney general of Knox County. In late 1952, Duncan became embroiled in a local controversy when, as commander of the American Legion's East Tennessee Division, he drafted a resolution condemning University of Tennessee's film society for a planned showing of several films starring Charlie Chaplin, who had been accused of being a communist sympathizer. Reacting to the resolution, University of Tennessee president Cloide Brehm cancelled the event. The school's newspaper, the Orange and White, nevertheless blasted Duncan's accusations as "nonsense."

=== Mayor of Knoxville ===
In 1959, Duncan was elected mayor of Knoxville in an election held to replace Mayor Jack Dance, who had died while in office. One of his first initiatives was to complete the overhaul of Market Square, which involved the demolition of the old Market House and its replacement by the Market Square Mall. In spite of opposition from historical interests, who wanted to preserve the Market House, Duncan pushed forward with the transition, and by mid-1960 the Market House had been removed.

Another contentious issue erupted in the Summer of 1960, when several black students from Knoxville College initiated a series of sit-ins to protest segregation at downtown-area lunch counters. With the backing of the Chamber of Commerce, Duncan formed a Good Will Committee, which encouraged downtown businesses to integrate their lunch counters. By July 1960, most downtown businesses had done away with their policies of segregation. Duncan's early intervention in the crisis is often cited as one of the reasons Knoxville avoided the widespread integration-related violence that plagued other Southern cities during this period.

Like his predecessors, Duncan struggled to alleviate the city's unemployment problem, which had been brought on by the closure of several textile mills and the shift of the city's major retail centers to West Knoxville. Numerous companies expressed interest in relocating to Knoxville, but could not do so due to a lack of suitable industrial sites. Duncan proposed a bond issue to fund the preparation of a large industrial site, but met immediate opposition from the city's conservative elements, which rejected government subsidies for business, and the bond proposal was defeated in a referendum.

=== Congressional career ===
In 1964, roughly 10 months into his second term as mayor, Duncan won a hard-fought Republican primary election in the Knoxville-based Second Congressional District. The district's seven-term incumbent, Howard Baker Sr., had died that January, and his wife Irene held the seat for the rest of his term as a caretaker. Duncan was heavily favored due to his popularity as mayor of Knoxville and the heavy Republican tilt of the district. The 2nd had been one of the few areas of Tennessee where most residents supported the Union over the Confederacy. Its residents identified with the GOP soon after the return of peace, and have continued to support the Republicans through good times and bad ever since. As a result, the 2nd's seat has been in the hands of the GOP or its predecessors without interruption since 1857. He defeated Democrat Willard Yarborough by just under 10 percentage points, the closest race in the district since Baker's first run in 1950. The contest was closer than expected in part because the 2nd was nearly swept up in Lyndon Johnson's national landslide in that year's presidential election; Barry Goldwater just barely carried it.

Duncan never faced another close contest, and was reelected 11 times, including two unopposed runs in 1972 and 1982. He often won re-election by some of the largest majorities of any congressman. He was a member of the House Ways and Means Committee for much of his congressional career. A staunch conservative, he supported U.S. involvement in the Vietnam War, and advocated tougher policies against antiwar demonstrators. Duncan voted against the Voting Rights Act of 1965 but in favor of the Civil Rights Act of 1968. He was one of the first congressmen to endorse Richard Nixon for president in 1967.

In the late 1970s, Duncan engaged in a protracted legislative struggle with environmentalists over the Tennessee Valley Authority's construction of Tellico Dam, on the Little Tennessee River, in Duncan's district. The dam's completion had been halted over concerns for the endangered snail darter, which lived in the river. After numerous failed attempts to amend the Endangered Species Act to allow the dam's completion, Duncan managed to insert a rider into the Energy and Water Development Appropriations Act in July 1979, on a day when most House members were absent. The dam's opponents cried foul, but the bill nevertheless passed the Senate and was signed into law, allowing TVA to finally close the dam's gates.

Duncan served in the House until his death from prostate cancer in 1988.

== Personal life ==
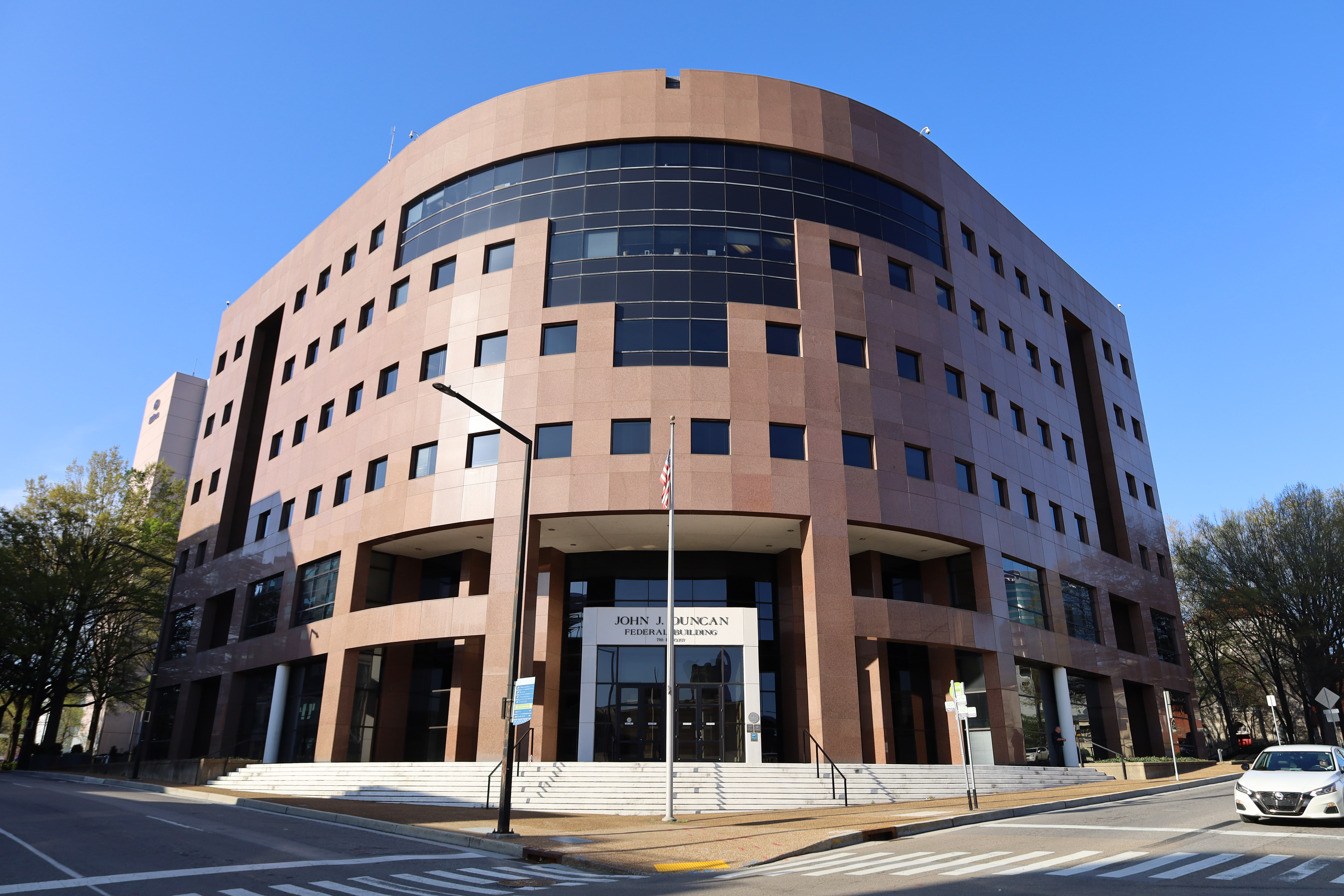
John J. Duncan Federal Building in Knoxville, Tennessee in 2025

Duncan married Lois Swisher of Iowa City, Iowa in 1942. They had four children, including John J. "Jimmy" Duncan Jr., who won his father's former congressional seat in the special election that followed his father's death.

== See also ==
- List of members of the United States Congress who died in office (1950–1999)

U.S. House of Representatives
| Preceded by E. Irene Bailey Baker | Member of the U.S. House of Representatives from Tennessee's 2nd congressional district 1965 – 1988 | Succeeded by John Duncan Jr. |
