= 2000 United States House of Representatives elections in Tennessee =

- November 7, 2000

All 9 Tennessee seats to the United States House of Representatives
- Turnout: 63.03% ▲30.50 pp
	Majority party	Minority party
Party	Republican	Democratic
Last election	5	4
Seats won	5	4
Seat change	Steady	Steady
Popular vote	991,984	819,100
Percentage	53.49%	44.17%
Swing	▲2.09%	▼0.97%

Republican hold
Democratic hold
Republican
50–60%
60–70%
70–80%
80–90%
90–100%
Democratic
50–60%
60–70%
70–80%
80–90%
90–100%

The 2000 congressional elections in Tennessee was held on November 7, 2000, to determine who will represent the state of Tennessee in the United States House of Representatives.

Following the 2000 elections, no seats changed hands, leaving the Tennessee delegation at a 5-4 Republican majority.

== Overview ==
United States House of Representatives elections in Tennessee, 2000
Party	Votes	Percentage	Seats	+/–
Republican	991,984	53.49%	5	—
Democratic	819,100	44.17%	4	—
Independents	41,851	2.26%	0	—
Write-ins	1,443	0.08%	0	—
Totals	1,854,378	100.00%	9	—

Popular vote
Republican	53.49%
Democratic	44.17%
Other	2.34%

House seats
Republican	55.56%
Democratic	44.44%

=== By district ===
District	Incumbent			Results	Candidates
District	Member	Party	First elected	Results	Candidates
Tennessee 1	Bill Jenkins	Republican	1996	Incumbent re-elected.	▌ ✓ Bill Jenkins (Republican) Uncontested
Tennessee 2	Jimmy Duncan	Republican	1988	Incumbent re-elected.	▌ ✓ Jimmy Duncan (Republican) 90%
Tennessee 3	Zach Wamp	Republican	1994	Incumbent re-elected.	▌ ✓ Zach Wamp (Republican) 64%; ▌William Callaway (Democratic) 35%
Tennessee 4	Van Hilleary	Republican	1994	Incumbent re-elected.	▌ ✓ Van Hilleary (Republican) 66%; ▌David Dunaway (Democratic) 34%
Tennessee 5	Bob Clement	Democratic	1988	Incumbent re-elected.	▌ ✓ Bob Clement (Democratic) 73%; ▌Stan Scott (Republican) 25%
Tennessee 6	Bart Gordon	Democratic	1984	Incumbent re-elected.	▌ ✓ Bart Gordon (Democratic) 63%; ▌David Charles (Republican) 37%
Tennessee 7	Ed Bryant	Republican	1994	Incumbent re-elected.	▌ ✓ Ed Bryant (Republican) 70%; ▌Richard Sims (Democratic) 30%
Tennessee 8	John S. Tanner	Democratic	1988	Incumbent re-elected.	▌ ✓ John S. Tanner (Democratic) 72%; ▌Bill Yancy (Democratic) 28%
Tennessee 9	Harold Ford Jr.	Democratic	1996	Incumbent re-elected.	▌ ✓ Harold Ford Jr. (Democratic) Uncontested

== District 1 ==
2000 Tennessee's 1st congressional district election
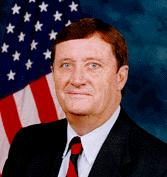
Nominee	Bill Jenkins
Party	Republican
Popular vote	157,826
Percentage	100.0%
U.S. Representative before election
Bill Jenkins
Republican
Elected U.S. Representative
Bill Jenkins
Republican

Tennessee's 1st congressional district election, 2000
Party	Candidate	Votes	%
Republican	Bill Jenkins (inc.)	157,826	99.99%
Write-In	Write-ins	20	0.01%
Total votes		157,846	100.00%
Republican hold			

== District 2 ==
2000 Tennessee's 2nd congressional district election
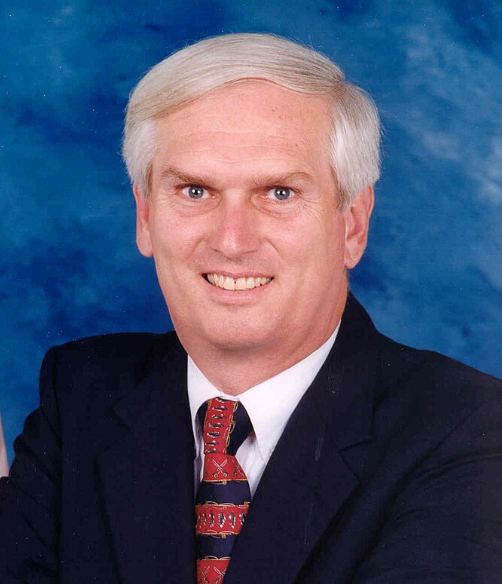

Nominee	Jimmy Duncan	Kevin J. Rowland
Party	Republican	Independent
Popular vote	187,154	22,304
Percentage	89.3%	10.7%
- County results Duncan: 80–90% 90–100%
U.S. Representative before election
Jimmy Duncan
Republican
Elected U.S. Representative
Jimmy Duncan
Republican

Tennessee's 2nd congressional district election, 2000
Party	Candidate	Votes	%
Republican	Jimmy Duncan (inc.)	187,154	89.34%
Independent	Kevin J. Rowland	22,304	10.65%
Write-In	Write-ins	27	0.01%
Total votes		209,485	100.00%
Republican hold			

== District 3 ==
2000 Tennessee's 3rd congressional district election
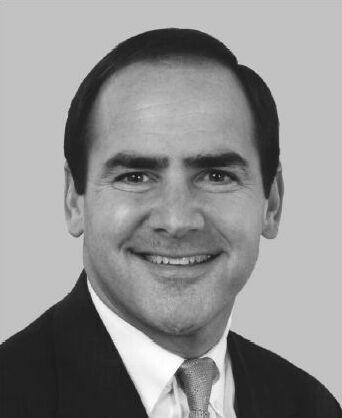

Nominee	Zach Wamp	William L. Callaway
Party	Republican	Democratic
Popular vote	139,840	75,785
Percentage	63.9%	34.6%
- County results Wamp: 50–60% 60–70% Callaway: 50–60%
U.S. Representative before election
Zach Wamp
Republican
Elected U.S. Representative
Zach Wamp
Republican

Tennessee's 3rd congressional district election, 2000
Party	Candidate	Votes	%
Republican	Zach Wamp (inc.)	139,840	63.87%
Democratic	William L. Callaway	75,785	34.61%
Independent	Trudy Austin	3,235	1.48%
Write-In	Write-ins	80	0.04%
Total votes		218,940	100.00%
Republican hold			

== District 4 ==
2000 Tennessee's 4th congressional district election
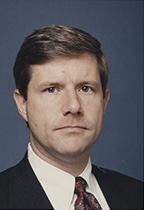

Nominee	Van Hilleary	David Dunaway
Party	Republican	Democratic
Popular vote	133,622	67,165
Percentage	65.8%	33.0%
- County results Hilleary: 50–60% 60–70% 70–80%
U.S. Representative before election
Van Hilleary
Republican
Elected U.S. Representative
Van Hilleary
Republican

Tennessee's 4th congressional district election, 2000
Party	Candidate	Votes	%
Republican	Van Hilleary (inc.)	133,622	65.76%
Democratic	David Dunaway	67,165	33.05%
Independent	J. Patrick Lyons	2,418	1.19%
Write-In	Write-ins	5	0.00%
Total votes		203,210	100.00%
Republican hold			

== District 5 ==
2000 Tennessee's 5th congressional district election
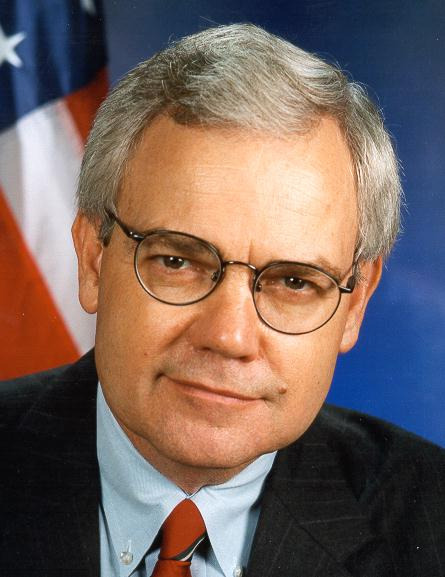

Nominee	Bob Clement	Stan R. Scott
Party	Democratic	Republican
Popular vote	149,277	50,386
Percentage	72.5%	24.5%
- County results Clement: 70–80%
U.S. Representative before election
Bob Clement
Democratic
Elected U.S. Representative
Bob Clement
Democratic

Tennessee's 5th congressional district election, 2000
Party	Candidate	Votes	%
Democratic	Bob Clement (inc.)	149,277	72.49%
Republican	Stan R. Scott	50,386	24.47%
Independent	David Carew	6,268	3.04%
Write-In	Write-ins	2	0.00%
Total votes		205,933	100.00%
Democratic hold			

== District 6 ==
2000 Tennessee's 6th congressional district election
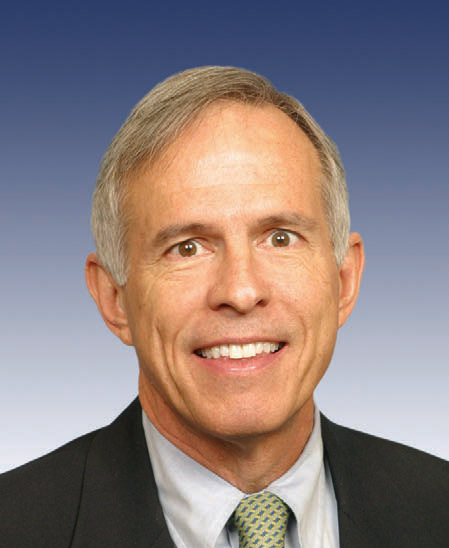

Nominee	Bart Gordon	David R. Charles
Party	Democratic	Republican
Popular vote	168,861	97,169
Percentage	62.1%	35.7%
- County results Gordon: 60–70% 70–80% 80–90% Charles: 40–50% 50–60%
U.S. Representative before election
Bart Gordon
Democratic
Elected U.S. Representative
Bart Gordon
Democratic

Tennessee's 6th congressional district election, 2000
Party	Candidate	Votes	%
Democratic	Bart Gordon (inc.)	168,861	62.10%
Republican	David R. Charles	97,169	35.74%
Independent	Jim Coffer	4,685	1.72%
Write-In	Write-ins	1,184	0.44%
Total votes		271,899	100.00%
Democratic hold			

== District 7 ==
2000 Tennessee's 7th congressional district election
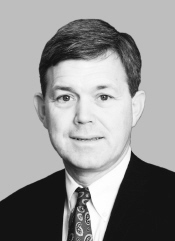

Nominee	Ed Bryant	Richard Sims
Party	Republican	Democratic
Popular vote	171,056	71,587
Percentage	69.6%	29.1%
- County results Bryant: 50–60% 60–70% 70–80%
U.S. Representative before election
Ed Bryant
Republican
Elected U.S. Representative
Ed Bryant
Republican

Tennessee's 7th congressional district election, 2000
Party	Candidate	Votes	%
Republican	Ed Bryant (inc.)	171,056	69.63%
Democratic	Richard Sims	71,587	29.14%
Independent	Denis Solee	2,941	1.20%
Write-In	Write-ins	65	0.03%
Total votes		245,649	100.00%
Republican hold			

== District 8 ==
2000 Tennessee's 8th congressional district election
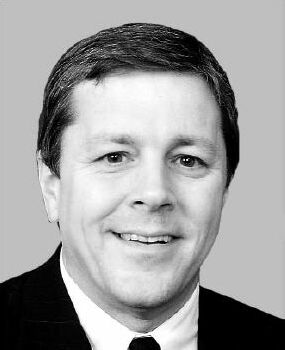

Nominee	John Tanner	Billy R. Yancy
Party	Democratic	Republican
Popular vote	143,127	54,929
Percentage	72.3%	27.7%
- County results Tanner: 50–60% 60–70% 70–80% 80–90%
U.S. Representative before election
John Tanner
Democratic
Elected U.S. Representative
John Tanner
Democratic

Tennessee's 8th congressional district election, 2000
Party	Candidate	Votes	%
Democratic	John Tanner (inc.)	143,127	72.26%
Republican	Billy R. Yancy	54,929	27.73%
Write-In	Write-ins	24	0.01%
Total votes		198,080	100.00%
Democratic hold			

== District 9 ==
2000 Tennessee's 9th congressional district election
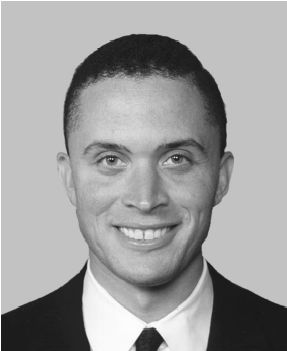
Nominee	Harold Ford Jr.
Party	Democratic
Popular vote	143,298
Percentage	100.0%
U.S. Representative before election
Harold Ford Jr.
Democratic
Elected U.S. Representative
Harold Ford Jr.
Democratic

Tennessee's 9th congressional district election, 2000
Party	Candidate	Votes	%
Democratic	Harold Ford Jr. (inc.)	143,298	99.97%
Write-In	Write-ins	36	0.03%
Total votes		143,334	100.00%
Democratic hold			

== See also ==
- 2000 United States presidential election in Tennessee
- 2000 United States Senate election in Tennessee
- 2000 Tennessee elections
- 2000 United States elections
