= Irene Baker =

American politician (1901–1994)

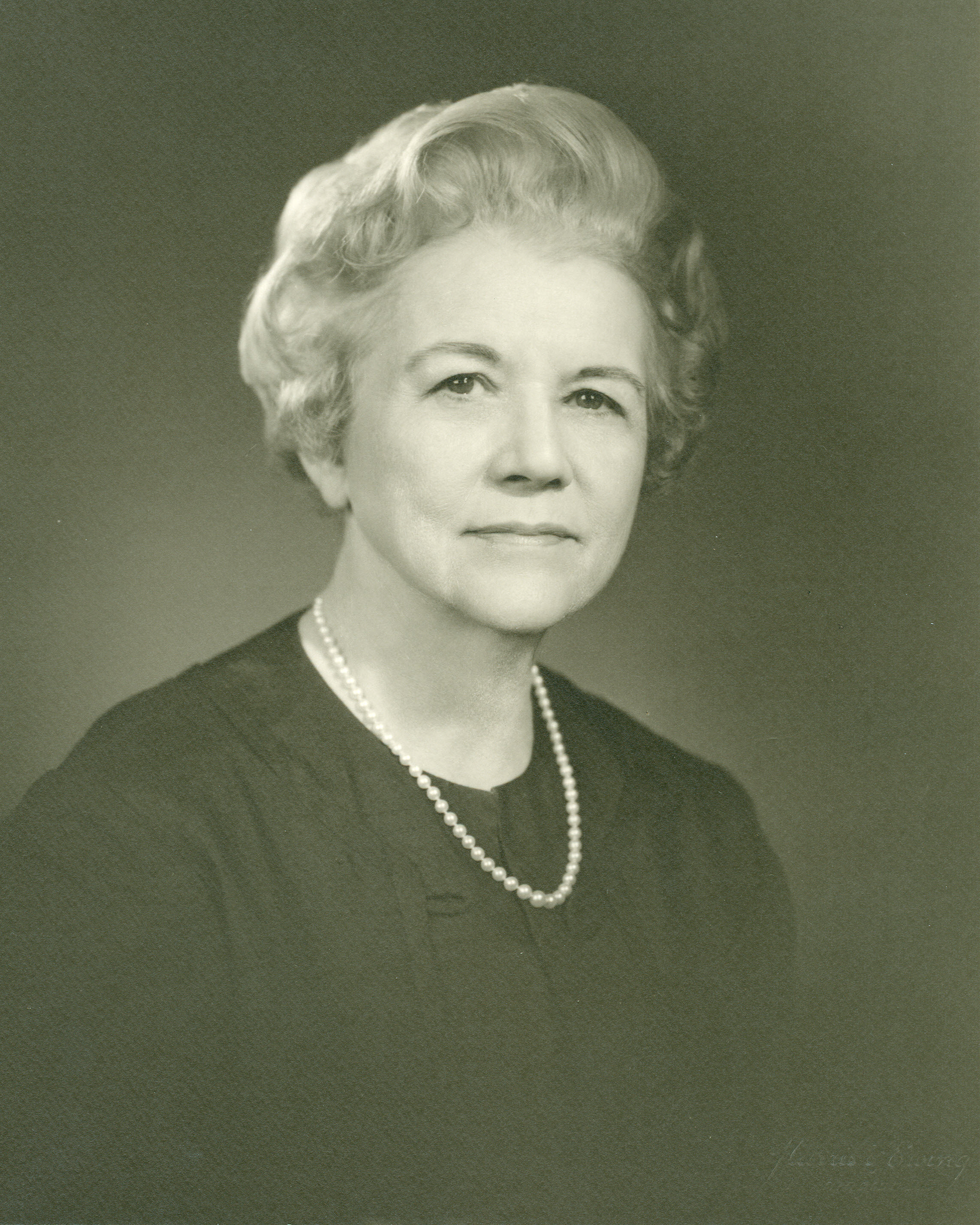

Member of the U.S. House of Representatives from Tennessee's 2nd district
- In office March 10, 1964 – January 3, 1965
- Preceded by: Howard Baker Sr.
- Succeeded by: John Duncan Sr.

Personal details
- Born: Edith Irene Bailey; November 17, 1901 Sevierville, Tennessee
- Died: April 2, 1994 (aged 92) Loudon, Tennessee
- Citizenship: United States
- Party: Republican
- Spouse: Howard Baker Sr.
- Children: Howard H. Baker Jr. (stepson); Mary Elizabeth Baker (stepdaughter); Beverly Irene Baker
- Profession: politician

Edith Irene Bailey Baker (November 17, 1901 – April 2, 1994) was an American politician and a United States representative from Tennessee. She was the widow of Howard Baker Sr. and the stepmother of Howard Baker Jr.

== Biography ==
Baker was born in Sevierville, Tennessee, on November 17, 1901, and attended public schools in Sevierville and Maryville.

== Career ==
Baker served as Deputy County Court Clerk of Sevier County from 1918 to 1922 and as Deputy Clerk and Master of Chancery Court from 1922 to 1924.

After her first husband's death, Baker went to work for the Tennessee Valley Authority (TVA). On September 15, 1935, she married Howard Baker Sr., who was a widower with two children. The couple raised Baker's two children from his first marriage, Howard H. Baker Jr. and Mary Elizabeth Baker, as well as a daughter of their own, Beverly Irene Baker. She served on the Republican National Committee from 1960 to 1964.

When her husband died suddenly in office on January 7, 1964, Baker ran as a Republican in the special election to fill the remainder of his term, defeating Democrat Willard Yarbrough, a Knoxville journalist. As a candidate for the seat, she promised to serve only as a caretaker who would not seek further election; and she fulfilled that promise, and served from March 10, 1964, to January 3, 1965. While in Congress, she served on the House Committee on Government Operations and advocated for a balanced federal budget. She also championed coal mining interests, the TVA, U.S. Atomic Energy Commission programs in Oak Ridge, Tennessee, and cost of living increases in Social Security pensions. As one of ten Republicans from the South, she voted against the Civil Rights Act.

After leaving Congress in 1965, Baker became Director of Public Welfare in Knoxville, Tennessee, a position she held until 1971.

== Death ==
Baker died in Loudon, Tennessee on April 2, 1994 (age 92 years, 136 days). She is interred at Sherwood Memorial Gardens, in Loudon, Tennessee.

== See also ==
- Women in the United States House of Representatives

U.S. House of Representatives
Preceded by Howard H. Baker Sr.	Member of the U.S. House of Representatives from Tennessee's 2nd congressional district 1964–1965	Succeeded by John Duncan Sr.
