= Henry R. Gibson =

American politician (1837–1938)

Henry Richard Gibson
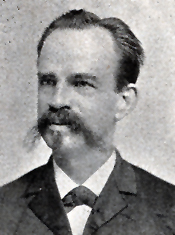

Member of the U.S. House of Representatives from Tennessee's 2nd district
- In office March 4, 1895 – March 3, 1905
- Preceded by: John Chiles Houk
- Succeeded by: Nathan W. Hale

Member of the Tennessee House of Representatives
- In office 1875–1877

Member of the Tennessee Senate
- In office 1871–1873

Personal details
- Born: December 24, 1837 Kent Island, Maryland, US
- Died: May 25, 1938 (aged 100) Washington, D.C., US
- Party: Republican
- Spouse(s): Frances (Reed) Gibson (m. 1863–1919, her death); Lizzie (Beckerdite) Clark (m. 1920)
- Relations: Charles Hopper Gibson (cousin)
- Children: 2
- Education: Hobart College; Albany Law School
- Profession: Attorney, newspaper editor, author

Henry Richard Gibson (December 24, 1837 – May 25, 1938) was an American attorney and politician who represented Tennessee's 2nd district in the U.S. House of Representatives from 1895 to 1905. He also served as a state chancery court judge, and was a delegate to Tennessee's 1870 constitutional convention. Outside politics he wrote and edited several books on federal and state law.

== Early life ==
Gibson was born on Kent Island, Maryland, in Queen Anne's County, son of Woolman and Catherine (Carter) Gibson. He attended the common schools at Kent Island and at Bladensburg, Maryland. He graduated from Decker's Academy at Bladensburg in 1858 and from Hobart College at Geneva, New York, in 1862.

Gibson served in the commissary department of the Union Army from March 1863 to July 1865. He entered Albany Law School in New York in September 1865. He was admitted to the bar in December 1865 and commenced practice in Knoxville, Tennessee, in January 1866. He moved to Jacksboro, Tennessee, in Campbell County in October 1866, and was appointed commissioner of claims by Governor William G. Brownlow in 1868. He eventually formed a law partnership with Leonidas C. Houk.

In 1870, Gibson represented Anderson and Campbell counties at the state convention which created the present Tennessee State Constitution. He served on the convention's legislative committee. At the convention, he proposed a resolution calling on the state to ratify the 15th Amendment to the U.S. Constitution, but the resolution failed (Tennessee wouldn't ratify the amendment until 1997). He also presented a memorial calling for the creation of Loudon County.

Gibson was a member of the Tennessee Senate from 1871 to 1873, representing the fourth district (Claiborne, Grainger, Anderson and Campbell). He was a member of the Tennessee House of Representatives from 1875 to 1877, representing Union, Campbell and Scott counties.

Gibson returned to Knoxville in 1876, and founded the Knoxville Republican, a campaign newspaper, three years later. In 1882, he and a group of investors purchased the Knoxville Daily Chronicle from William Rule, and merged it with the Republican under the new name, Knoxville Republican-Chronicle (Rule would re-purchase this paper within a few years, however). Gibson served as a United States pension agent at Knoxville from June 22, 1883, until June 9, 1885. From 1886 to 1894, he was chancellor of the second chancery division of Tennessee. In 1891, he published a legal text, Gibson’s Suits in Chancery. Gibson worked as a professor of medical jurisprudence at the Tennessee Medical College from 1889 to 1906.

== Congress ==
Gibson's law partner, Leonidas Houk, was elected to the 2nd district seat in the U.S. House of Representatives in 1878, and served throughout the 1880s. During this period, Houk developed a political machine that largely controlled the state Republican Party, and established Republican dominance in the 1st and 2nd districts. Gibson, who remained a close confidant of Houk, was influential within the Houk machine, and was considered by many Houk's rightful successor following the congressman's sudden death in 1891. He lacked the organization to mount a campaign, however, and Houk's son, John Chiles Houk, was elected to the congressional seat.

In 1893, Gibson launched his campaign for the 2nd district seat. The younger Houk's popularity had declined when evidence surfaced that he had helped ensure the defeat of Houk machine rival Henry Clay Evans in the 3rd district. Historian Gordon McKinney described the contest between Gibson and Houk for the Republican nomination as "one of the dirtiest in East Tennessee history." Houk assailed Gibson's war record, and managed to have Gibson expelled from the Grand Army of the Republic (the GAR determined Gibson had been a civilian employee, not a soldier). Gibson accused Houk of frequently missing votes, including a key vote on a veterans' pensions bill, and argued that the silence of politicians like Houk on the tariff issue was to blame for the Panic of 1893. In the March primary, Gibson edged Houk, 14,072 votes to 13,119. Houk refused to drop out, and opposed Gibson as an independent in the general election, but again was defeated, 16,215 votes to 13,191 (the Democrats did not field a candidate).

Gibson supported protectionist measures, such as tariffs on imports, and generally supported prohibition. In January 1896, he introduced a bill that would have provided pensions for survivors of the steamboat Sultana disaster, though the bill was never passed. He voted for the declaration of war with Spain in April 1898. On June 14, 1898, he delivered a speech on the House floor calling for the annexation of Hawaii and the construction of the Nicaragua Canal.

During the intraparty fighting between Walter P. Brownlow and Henry Clay Evans for control of the state Republican Party, Gibson aligned himself with Brownlow. In 1902, Nathan W. Hale, who was supported by the Evans faction, challenged Gibson for the 2nd district's Republican nomination, but was defeated in the primary. Gibson did not seek reelection in 1904.

== Later life ==
After his service as United States Representative, Gibson retired from public life and resided in Washington, D.C. He was engaged as a writer, as an author, and as a consulting editor of the American and English Encyclopedia of Law and Practice. In 1907, he published a 368-page epic poem, The Maid of Redenfayn. He published an expanded version of this poem in 1912 under the title, The Ban of Baldurbane. He was an associate reviser in 1918 of the Code of Tennessee, having helped edit the 1896 volume.

Gibson died on May 25, 1938, at the age of 100 in Washington. His remains were cremated and the ashes were spread around his hometown in Maryland, though a monument at Old Gray Cemetery in Knoxville bears his name.

At the time of his death, he was the last living person known to have been born in 1837, as the last Union general Aaron Daggett died 11 days prior.

== Family ==
Gibson married Frances Reed on November 12, 1863. They had two daughters. Following her death in 1919, he married Lizzie (Beckerdite) Clark in 1920.

U.S. House of Representatives
Preceded by John C. Houk	Member of the U.S. House of Representatives from Tennessee's 2nd congressional district 1895–1905	Succeeded by Nathan W. Hale
