= John Jennings (American politician) =

American politician (1880–1956)

John Jennings Jr.
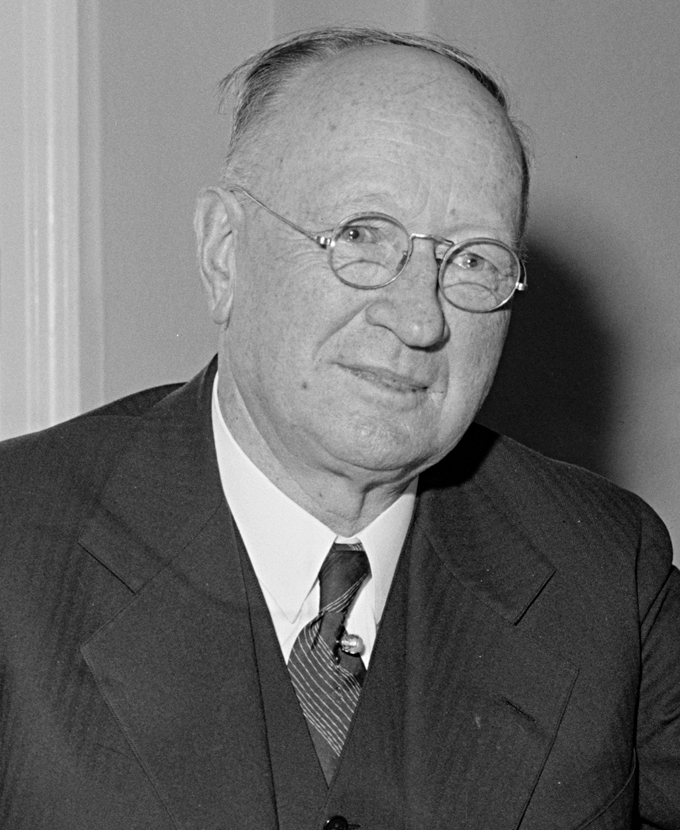
- Jennings in 1939

Member of the U.S. House of Representatives from Tennessee's 2nd district
- In office December 30, 1939 – January 3, 1951
- Preceded by: J. Will Taylor
- Succeeded by: Howard Baker Sr.

Personal details
- Born: June 6, 1880 Jacksboro, Tennessee, U.S.
- Died: February 27, 1956 (aged 75) Knoxville, Tennessee, U.S.
- Party: Republican
- Education: U.S. Grant University
- Profession: Attorney, politician, judge

John Jennings Jr. (June 6, 1880 – February 27, 1956) was an American Republican, and a U.S. Representative from Tennessee from 1939 to 1951.

== Biography ==
Jennings was born in Jacksboro, Tennessee, on June 6, 1880. He attended public schools and American Temperance University in Harriman before graduating from U.S. Grant University in Athens, Tennessee, in 1906. He studied law, was admitted to the bar in 1903, and entered the practice of law in Jellico in his native Campbell County, Tennessee.

== Career ==
In Campbell County, Jennings served as county superintendent of public instruction in 1903 and 1904, and county attorney from 1911 to 1918. In 1918 he became special assistant to the Attorney General of the United States and judge of the second chancery division of Tennessee. He resigned the judgeship on July 1, 1923, and moved to Knoxville, Tennessee, where he continued the practice of law. He was a delegate to the Republican National Conventions in 1912, 1936, and 1944.

In 1939, Jennings was elected to Congress as a Republican, filling the vacancy caused by the death of J. Will Taylor. He took office on December 30, 1939. He won a full term in 1940, and was re-elected four more times. In 1950, Howard Baker Sr. defeated him in his bid for renomination, so he ended his Congressional service on January 3, 1951. After leaving Congress, he resumed the practice of law.

== Death ==
Jennings died in Knoxville on February 27, 1956, and is interred at Highland Memorial Cemetery.

U.S. House of Representatives
Preceded by J. Will Taylor	Member of the U.S. House of Representatives from Tennessee's 2nd congressional district 1939–1951	Succeeded by Howard Henry Baker Sr.
