= J. Will Taylor =

American politician (1880–1939)

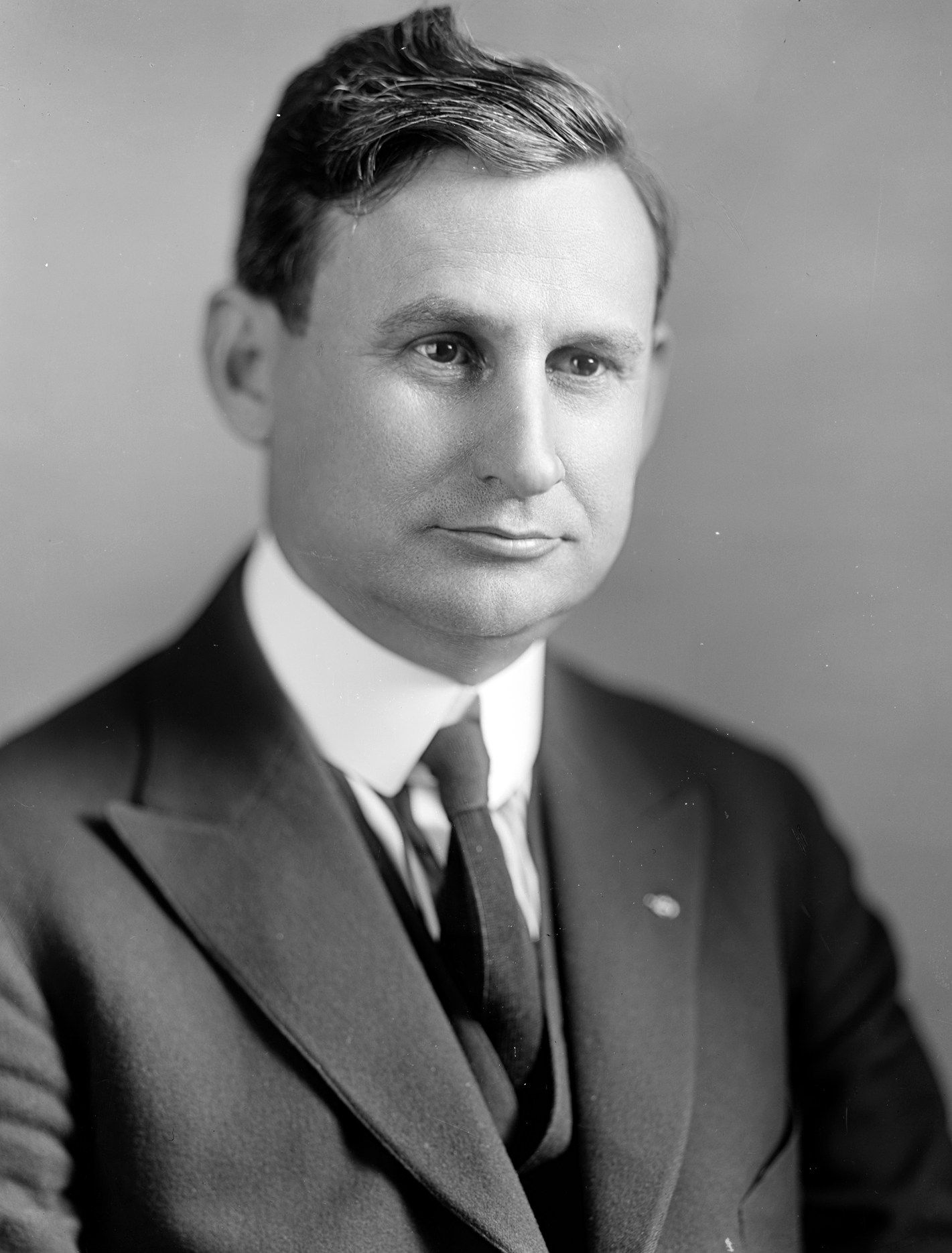
- Taylor, 1905–1939

Member of the U.S. House of Representatives from Tennessee's 2nd district
- In office March 4, 1919 – November 14, 1939
- Preceded by: Richard W. Austin
- Succeeded by: John Jennings Jr.

Personal details
- Born: James Willis Taylor; August 28, 1880 Union County, Tennessee, U.S.
- Died: November 14, 1939 (aged 59) La Follette, Tennessee, U.S.
- Resting place: Woodlawn Cemetery
- Party: Republican
- Education: American Temperance University; Cumberland University

James Willis "J. Will" Taylor (August 28, 1880 – November 14, 1939) was an American educator, lawyer and politician who served eleven terms as a U.S. representative from Tennessee from 1919 to 1939.

== Early life and education ==
Born near Lead Mine Bend in Union County, Tennessee, Taylor was the son of James W. and Sarah Elizabeth (Rogers) Taylor. He attended the public schools, Holbrook Normal College, Fountain City, Tennessee, and the American Temperance University in Harriman, Tennessee.

== Early career ==
Taylor taught at school for several years, and was graduated from Cumberland School of Law at Cumberland University, Lebanon, Tennessee, in 1902. He was admitted to the bar the same year.

Having moved to La Follette, Tennessee, Taylor commenced the practice of law. He served as postmaster at La Follette from 1904 to 1909.

== Political career ==
He was also mayor from 1910 to 1913, and in 1918 and 1919. He was Insurance commissioner for the State of Tennessee in 1913 and 1914 and chairman of the Republican State executive committee in 1917 and 1918.

Taylor generally voted with the conservative side, including in his last incomplete House term. During his tenure in Congress he was a dominant figure in the Tennessee Republican Party. He was a leading member of the state party's black-and-tan faction, which supported racial equality.

=== Congress ===
Taylor was elected as a Republican to the Sixty-sixth and to the ten succeeding Congresses and served from March 4, 1919, until his death. He served as chairman of the Committee on Expenditures in the Department of State (Sixty-eighth and Sixty-ninth Congresses).

He also served as member of the Republican National Executive Committee 1929–1939.

== Death ==
Taylor died in La Follette, Tennessee, on November 14, 1939 (age 59 years, 78 days). He is interred at Woodlawn Cemetery.

=== Legacy ===
A resolution by Walter White honoring Taylor was passed by the Tennessee House of Representatives in 1941.

== See also ==
- List of members of the United States Congress who died in office (1900–1949)

U.S. House of Representatives
Preceded by Richard W. Austin	Member of the U.S. House of Representatives from Tennessee's 2nd congressional district 1919–1939	Succeeded by John Jennings, Jr.
