= John C. Houk =

American politician (1860–1923)

John Chiles Houk
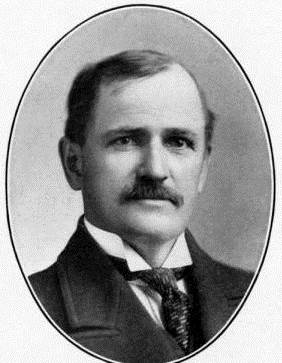

Member of the U.S. House of Representatives from Tennessee's 2nd district
- In office December 7, 1891 – March 3, 1895
- Preceded by: Leonidas C. Houk
- Succeeded by: Henry R. Gibson

Member of the Tennessee Senate
- In office 1897-1899; 1911-1913; 1917-1923

Personal details
- Born: February 26, 1860 Clinton, Tennessee, US
- Died: June 3, 1923 (aged 63) Fountain City, Tennessee, US
- Party: Republican
- Spouse: Minnie Obedience Young Houk
- Education: University of Tennessee
- Profession: Attorney; politician

John Chiles Houk (February 26, 1860 – June 3, 1923) was an American politician and a member of the United States House of Representatives for the 2nd congressional district of Tennessee.

== Biography ==
Houk was born in Clinton, Tennessee in Anderson County on February 26, 1860, son of Leonidas C. Houk and Elizabeth Houk. He attended the local schools, and moved with his parents to Knoxville in 1871. He graduated from the University of Tennessee at Knoxville.

== Career ==
Employed as a clerk in the Pensions Bureau at Washington, D.C., Houk worked from 1881 to 1883. He studied law at Columbian (now George Washington) University in Washington, D.C. He was admitted to the bar in 1884, and he commenced practice in Knoxville.

Houk was a secretary of the state Republican committee for four years. He was Assistant Doorkeeper of the House of Representatives in the Fifty-first Congress.

Elected as a Republican to the Fifty-second Congress to fill the vacancy caused by the death of his father, Leonidas C. Houk, Houk was re-elected to the Fifty-third Congress and served from December 7, 1891 to March 3, 1895. He was an unsuccessful candidate for renomination in 1894.

Houk served in the Tennessee Senate from 1897 to 1899 representing Knox, Cocke, Jefferson and Sevier Counties, from 1911 to 1913 representing Knox County, and from 1917 to 1923 representing Knox, Loudon, Monroe and Polk Counties. During an August 1920 special session of the Tennessee General Assembly, he was Republican senate floor leader and Albert E. Hill was Democratic senate floor leader supporting ratification of the Nineteenth Amendment granting women the right to vote. In 1923, Houk resumed the practice of law in Knoxville, Tennessee.

== Death ==
Houk died in Fountain City, Tennessee in Knox County on June 3, 1923 (age 63). He is interred at Greenwood Cemetery in Knoxville, Tennessee.

U.S. House of Representatives
Preceded by Leonidas C. Houk	Member of the U.S. House of Representatives from Tennessee's 2nd congressional district December 7, 1891 – March 3, 1895	Succeeded by Henry R. Gibson
