= Jimmy Duncan (politician) =

American politician (born 1947)

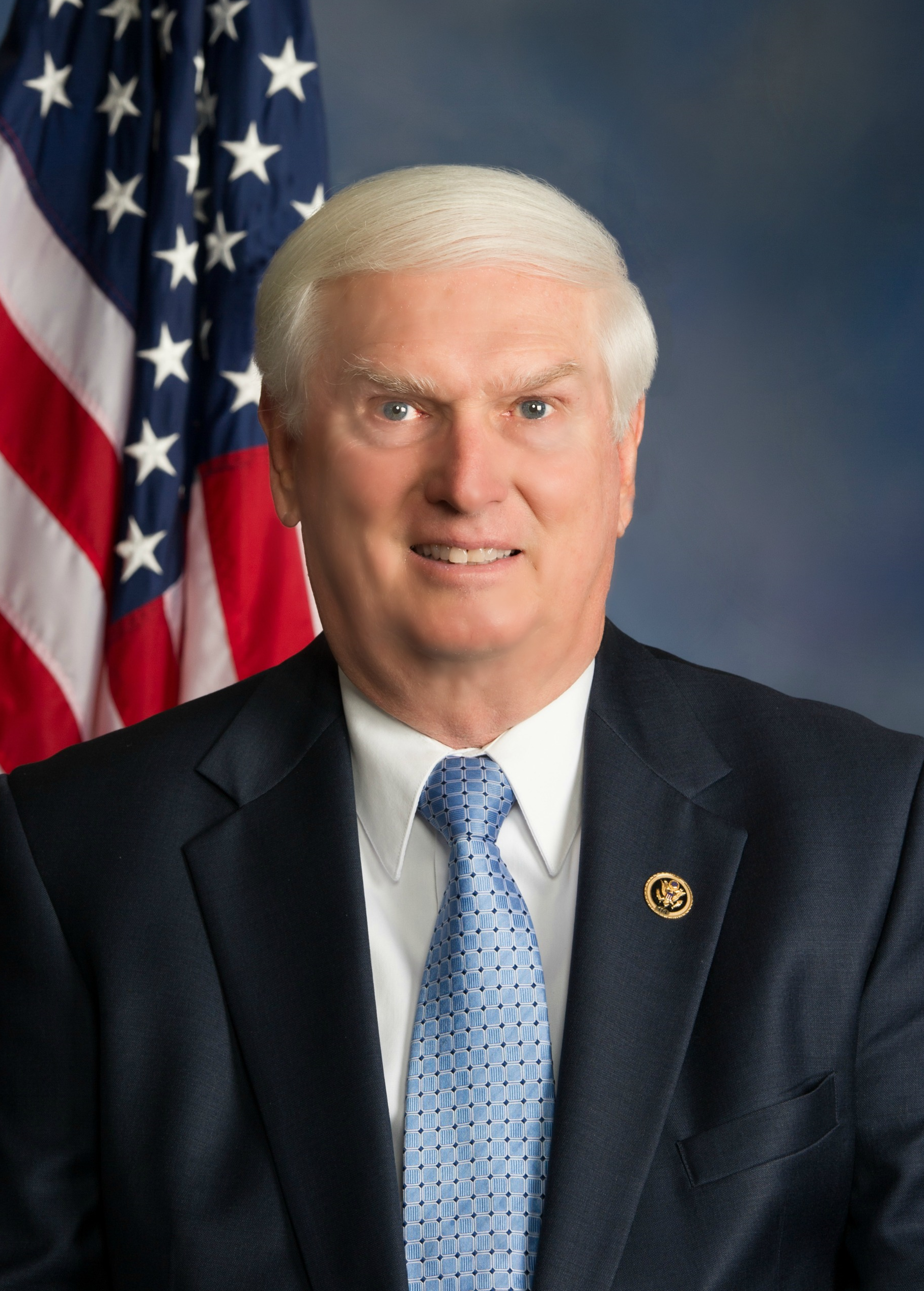
- Official portrait, 2018

Member of the U.S. House of Representatives from Tennessee's 2nd district
- In office November 8, 1988 – January 3, 2019 (Note: Duncan's official service begins on the date of the special election, while the House was adjourned sine die until the start of the next Congress on January 3, 1989.)
- Preceded by: John Duncan Sr.
- Succeeded by: Tim Burchett

Personal details
- Born: John James Duncan Jr. July 21, 1947 (age 79) Lebanon, Tennessee, U.S.
- Party: Republican
- Spouse(s): Lynn Hawkins (m. 1978; died 2021) Vicki Frye (m. 2022)
- Children: 4
- Parent: John Duncan Sr. (father)
- Education: University of Tennessee (BA); George Washington University (JD)

Military service
- Allegiance: United States
- Branch/service: United States Army
- Years of service: 1970–1987
- Rank: Captain
- Unit: United States Army Reserve • Tennessee Army National Guard
- Duncan's voice Duncan on how Andrew Jackson relates to modern American politics. Recorded October 13, 2011

John James Duncan Jr. (born July 21, 1947) is an American politician who served as the U.S. representative for Tennessee's 2nd congressional district from 1988 to 2019. An attorney, former Criminal Court judge, and former long serving member of the Army National Guard, published author and newspaper columnist. He is a member of the Republican Party.

== Early life, education, and legal career ==
Duncan was born in Lebanon, Tennessee, in Wilson County, Tennessee. His "paternal grandparents were small-acreage farmers in Scott County, which in 1861 left Tennessee, refusing to follow the Volunteer State into the Confederacy, and declared itself 'the Free and Independent state of Scott.'" Duncan's parents were Lois (Swisher) and John Duncan Sr., who "hitchhiked into Knoxville with five dollars in his pocket,' and after an education at the University of Tennessee was elected mayor of Knoxville and then congressman." The elder Duncan was also a co-owner of the Knoxville Smokies of the "Sally League," for which his son "was a batboy, a ball shagger, scoreboard operator, and, as a freshman at the University of Tennessee, the Smokies' public-address announcer." Duncan also worked as a grocery bagger and salesman at Sears while working his way through school. Duncan supported Barry Goldwater's 1964 presidential campaign, and sent the first paycheck he earned as a bag boy at the local A&P to the Goldwater campaign.

Duncan graduated from Holston High School in Knoxville, Tennessee. He completed his college course work at the University of Tennessee at Knoxville in 1969 with a Bachelor of Journalism degree and subsequently received a Juris Doctor degree from George Washington University Law School in Washington, D.C. in 1973 and was admitted to the bar that same year. He also served in the Army National Guard from 1970 to 1987. He was an attorney in private practice until he became a state court judge for the Criminal Court in Knox County, Tennessee following an appointment by Lamar Alexander. He served as Criminal Court judge from 1981 to 1988.

Duncan also served in the Army National Guard from 1970 to 1987, obtaining the ultimate rank of captain.

== U.S. House of Representatives ==
=== Elections ===
Duncan's father, John Sr., who had represented the Knoxville, Tennessee based 2nd District since 1965, died in June 1988. Jimmy Duncan won the Republican nomination to succeed him. He ran in and won two elections on November 8, 1988: a special election for the balance of his father's 12th term, followed by a regular election for a full two-year term. He was re-elected every two years from then until his retirement from a district that had been held continuously by Republicans (or their antecedents) since 1859, and by a Duncan since his father was first elected in 1964.

Duncan was held to 56 percent of the vote in 1988, but would never face another contest nearly that close. He won reelection fourteen times (1990-2016), generally garnering above 70% of the total vote each time. He never faced a serious or well-funded challenge for reelection, and was reelected without major-party opposition in four consecutive elections (1994 through 2000). For four the general elections from 1990 to 2000 Duncan's primary challenger came from an independent candidate or a member of the Libertarian Party. On the occasions he did face major-party opposition, he only dropped below 70% of the vote twice, during the special and regular elections in 1988, while surpassing the 80% threshold 5 times and once exceeding 90% of the total vote.

In 2017, he announced he would not seek re-election in the 2018 election for Tennessee's 2nd District, and would instead retire. His eventual replacement Tim Burchett, who was the Knox County, Tennessee Mayor at the time announced his intention to run for the seat shortly thereafter.

== Electoral history ==
U.S. House, Tennessee' 2nd Congressional District (General Election)
Year	Winning candidate	Party	Votes	Pct	Opponent	Party	Votes	Pct
1988	Jimmy Duncan	Republican	99,631	56.23%	Dudley W. Taylor	Democratic	77,540	43.76%
1990	Jimmy Duncan	Republican	62,797	80.57%	Peter Herbert	Independent	15,127	19.41%
1992	Jimmy Duncan	Republican	148,377	72.24%	Troy Goodale	Democratic	52,887	25.75%
1994	Jimmy Duncan	Republican	128,937	90.49%	Various	Independent	13,545	9.51%
1996	Jimmy Duncan	Republican	150,953	70.68%	Stephen Smith	Democratic	61,020	28.57%
1998	Jimmy Duncan	Republican	90,860	88.64%	Various	Independent	11,642	11.36%
2000	Jimmy Duncan	Republican	187,154	89.34%	Kevin J. Rowland	Libertarian	22,304	10.65%
2002	Jimmy Duncan	Republican	146,887	78.98%	John Greene	Democratic	37,035	19.91%
2004	Jimmy Duncan	Republican	215,795	79.07%	John Greene	Democratic	52,155	19.11%
2006	Jimmy Duncan	Republican	157,095	77.72%	John Greene	Democratic	45,025	22.28%
2008	Jimmy Duncan	Republican	227,128	78.12%	Bob Scott	Democratic	63,639	21.89%
2010	Jimmy Duncan	Republican	141,796	81.78%	Dave Hancock	Democratic	25,400	14.65%
2012	Jimmy Duncan	Republican	196,894	74.44%	Troy Goodale	Democratic	54,522	20.61%
2014	Jimmy Duncan	Republican	120,883	77.44%	Bob Scott	Democratic	37,621	24.10%
2016	Jimmy Duncan	Republican	212,455	75.65%	Stuart Starr	Democratic	68,401	24.35%

== Tenure ==
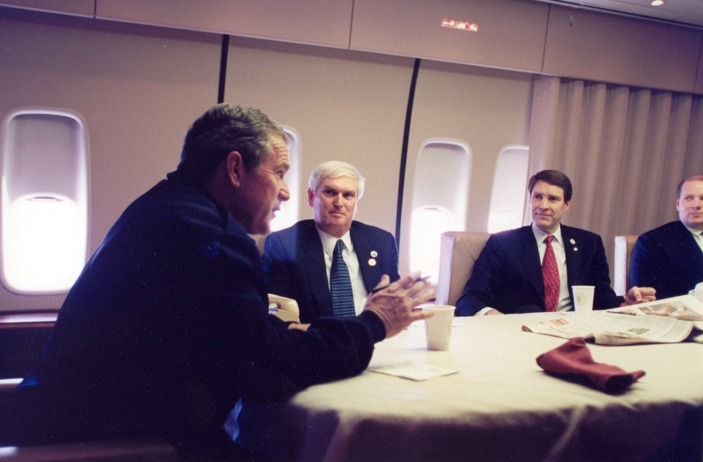
Duncan with President George W. Bush and U.S. Senator Bill Frist aboard Air Force One in 2001

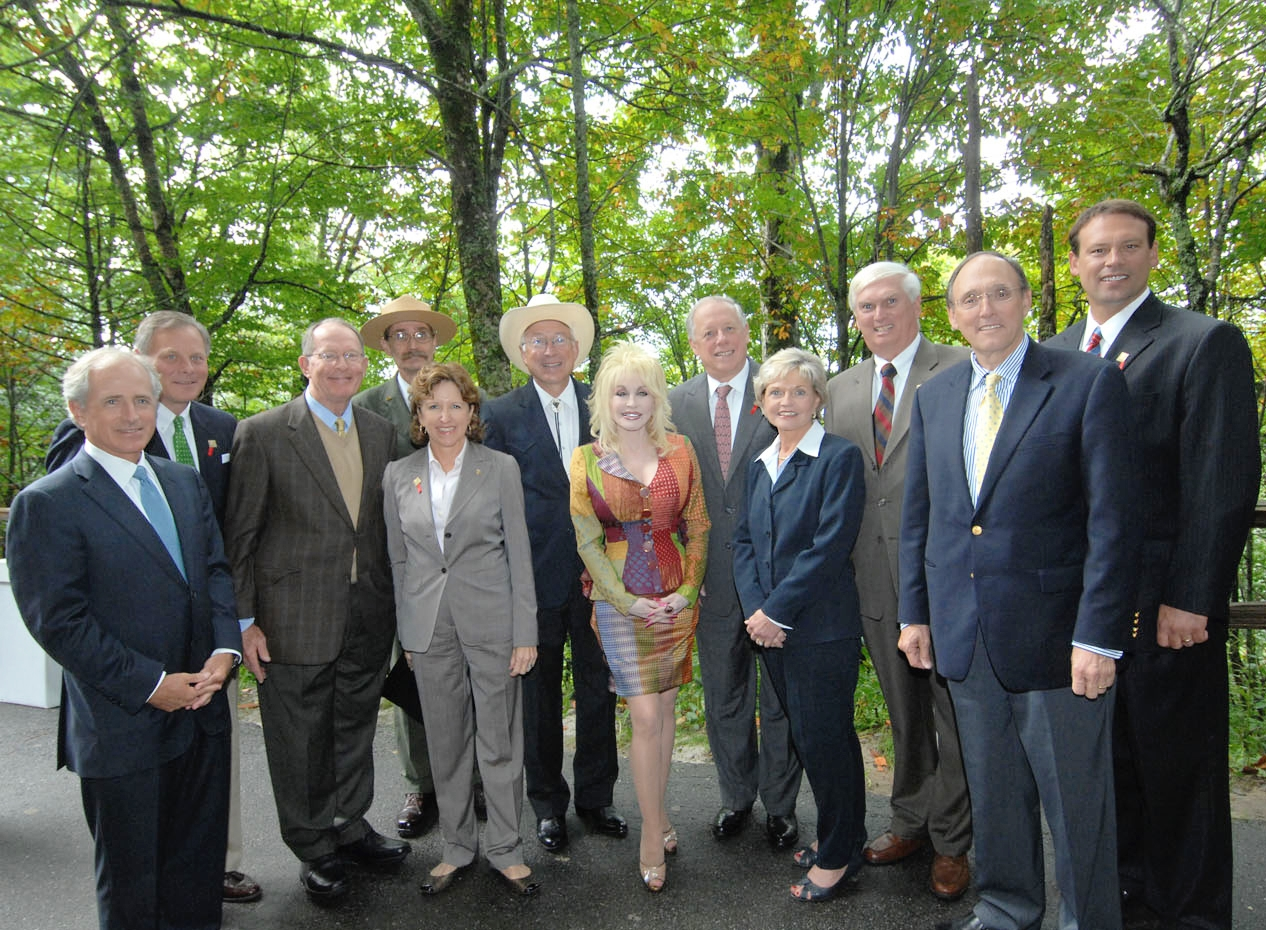
U.S. Senators Kay Hagan, Bob Corker, Richard Burr, Lamar Alexander, and Congressmen John Duncan (third from right), Heath Shuler with among others, Dolly Parton, at the Great Smoky Mountains National Park in 2009

Duncan voted against authorizing the 2003 War in Iraq based on opposition to what he believed to be an unnecessary foreign involvement. He also opposed and voted against a June 2006 House declaration in support of the war. He was one of the most conservative Republicans to do so. He later remarked that the Iraq War vote had been

[The War in Iraq was] a tough one for me. I have a very conservative Republican district. My Uncle Joe is one of the most respected judges in Tennessee: when I get in a really serious bind I go to him for advice. I had breakfast with him and my two closest friends and all three told me that I had to vote for the war. It's the only time in my life that I've ever gone against my Uncle Joe's advice. When I pushed that button to vote against the war back in 2002, I thought I might be ending my political career.

He was among only six Republicans to vote against funding for the Iraq War in May 2007. Duncan voted, along with three other Republicans, to withdraw U.S. troops from Iraq by April 2008 on July 12, 2007. He joined three other Republicans in March 2010, voting for the removal of troops from Afghanistan. Duncan and Ron Paul were the only members of Congress to vote for the removal of troops from Afghanistan and against all recent bailout and stimulus bills.

He has criticized neoconservatism and supports a non-interventionist foreign policy. He was a member of the Liberty Caucus, a group of libertarian-minded congressional Republicans.

He voted against the Wall Street bailout, explaining his vote in a column, stating he "thought it would be better in the long run not to adopt the socialist approach." The American Conservative Union gave him a 96% score for his voting record in 2013, higher than any other federal Representative in Congress from Tennessee.

The Family Research Council has rated him as a 92% or above since 2002 and the NRA Political Victory Fund has rated him in equally positive terms. He received the number one spot in the 435-member House in the National Taxpayers Union's (NTU) annual ranking of Congress in 2012, earning him the "Taxpayer Hero" award.

He is a frequent contributor to Chronicles and The American Conservative, both magazines associated with the paleoconservative movement. He has also contributed to numerous trade publications and Capitol Hill newspapers. Duncan has also voiced public support for returning to the gold standard.

He endorsed Donald Trump for the Republican presidential nomination in April 2016. He was one of only four Republicans to oppose the House's resolution 11 in January 2017 condemning the United Nations Security Council Resolution 2334.

He refused to hold any town halls in his district after the 2016 election of President Donald Trump. Duncan said that he preferred one-on-one meetings rather than town halls, adding that he was not willing to give a platform to "extremists, kooks, and radicals."

He announced in July 2017 that he would not run for reelection in 2018, desiring to spend more time with his family.

=== Committee assignments ===
- Committee on Transportation and Infrastructure (Vice Chair)
  - Subcommittee on Aviation (Former Chair)
  - Subcommittee on Highways and Transit (Former Chair)
  - Subcommittee on Railroads, Pipelines and Hazardous Materials
- Committee on Oversight and Government Reform
  - Subcommittee on Transportation and Public Assets
  - Subcommittee on National Security

=== Caucus memberships ===
- Congressional Friends of Scotland Caucus (Founding Co-chairman)
- Congressional Immigration Reform Caucus
- Liberty Caucus
- United States Congressional International Conservation Caucus
- Sportsmen's Caucus
- Veterinary Medicine Caucus
- Congressional Constitution Caucus
- Congressional NextGen 9-1-1 Caucus
- U.S.-Japan Caucus

== Post-congressional career ==
Following his retirement from the U.S. House of Representatives Duncan published a book about his life and career titled "From Batboy to Congressman." He also is a regular columnist for a newspaper in Knoxville.

== Personal life ==
Duncan and his wife Lynn (née Hawkins) were married in 1978. They have four children and eight grandchildren. Lynn died in August 2021. He married Vickie Dowling in May 2022.

He is also the brother of Tennessee State Senator Becky Duncan Massey. After retiring from Congress, Duncan relocated from his home in Knoxville to Bean Station in neighboring Grainger County.

U.S. House of Representatives
Preceded by John Duncan Sr.	Member of the U.S. House of Representatives from Tennessee's 2nd congressional district 1988–2019	Succeeded by Tim Burchett
U.S. order of precedence (ceremonial)
Preceded by Carolyn Maloney as Former U.S. Representative	Order of precedence of the United States as Former U.S. Representative	Succeeded by Dan Burton as Former U.S. Representative
