= Nathan W. Hale =

American politician

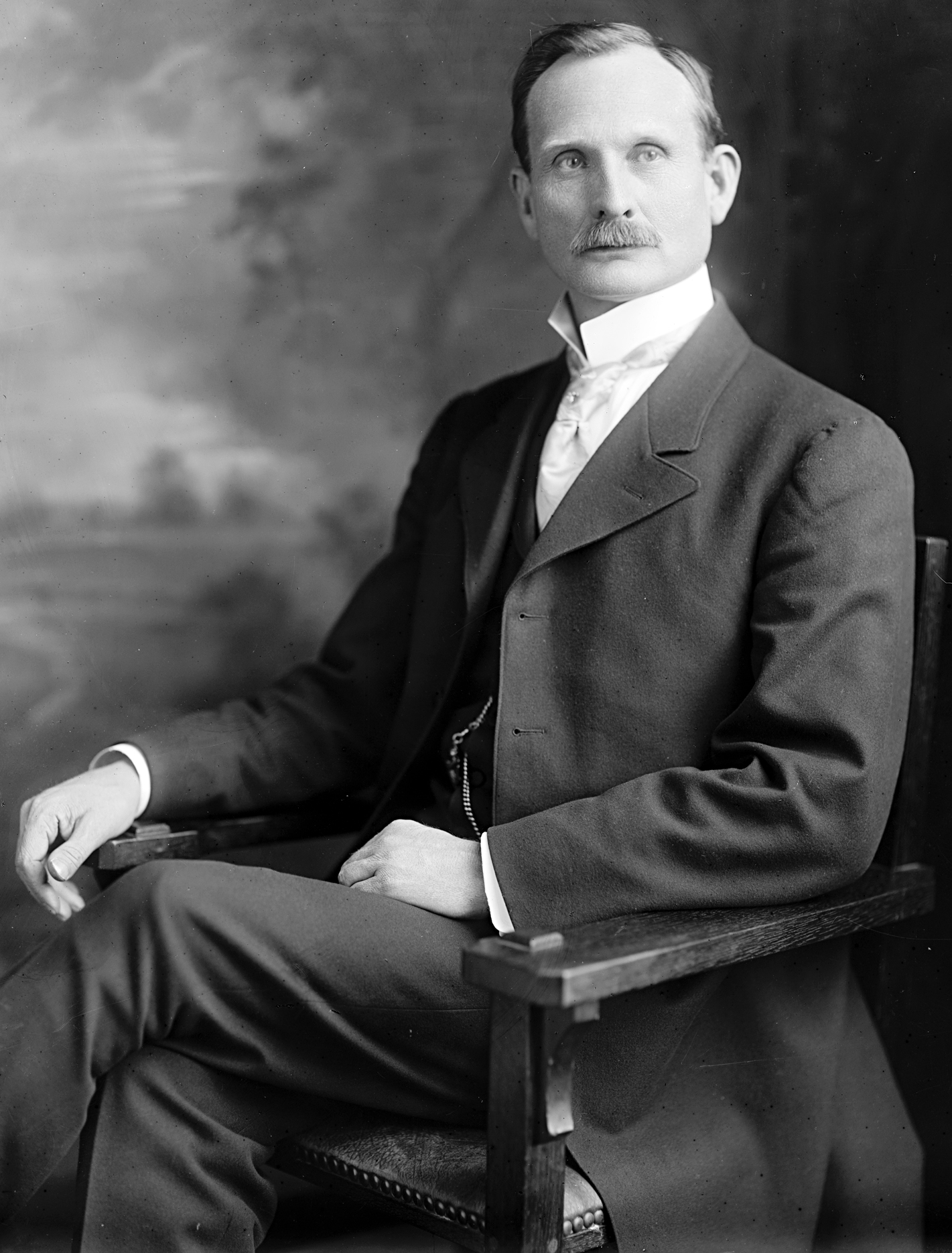
- Hale, photographed by Harris & Ewing

Member of the U.S. House of Representatives from Tennessee's 2nd district
- In office March 4, 1905 – March 3, 1909
- Preceded by: Henry R. Gibson
- Succeeded by: Richard W. Austin

Member of the Tennessee Senate
- In office 1893-1895

Member of the Tennessee House of Representatives
- In office 1891-1893

Personal details
- Born: Nathan Wesley Hale; February 11, 1860 Scott County, Virginia, US
- Died: September 16, 1941 (aged 81) Alhambra, California, US
- Resting place: Rose Hills Memorial Park in Whittier, California
- Party: Republican
- Spouse: Laura Adelaide (Sebastian) Hale
- Children: 5
- Profession: Nurseryman, entrepreneur

Nathan Wesley Hale (February 11, 1860 – September 16, 1941) was an American lawyer, businessman, and politician who served two terms as a member of the United States House of Representatives for the 2nd congressional district of Tennessee from 1905 to 1909.

== Biography ==
Born on February 11, 1860, near Gate City, Virginia, in Scott County, Hale was the son of Drayton Smithton and Ruth C. Frazier Hale. He attended the common schools of Nicholasville, Virginia and Kingsley Academy near Kingsport, Tennessee.

== Career ==
Hale taught school at Hale's Mill, Virginia in 1876. He moved to Knoxville, Tennessee, in 1878 and engaged in the nursery business as well as the wholesale dry goods business, banking, and farming. He married Laura Adelaide Sebastian in 1890, and they had five children.

=== Early political career ===
He served as a member of the Tennessee House of Representatives from 1891 to 1893. He was a member of the Tennessee Senate from 1893 to 1895. He was an unsuccessful candidate for the Republican nomination in 1902 as a Representative to the Fifty-eighth Congress.

=== Congress ===
Elected as a Republican to the Fifty-ninth and Sixtieth Congresses, Hale served from March 4, 1905, to March 3, 1909. He was an unsuccessful candidate for re-election in 1908 to the Sixty-first Congress.

Hale was a delegate to the Republican National Convention in 1908 and a member of the Republican National Committee from 1908 to 1912.

=== Later career and death ===
In 1909, he moved to Los Angeles, California, and engaged in the oil and real estate business until his death.

== Death and burial ==
On September 16, 1941, Hale died in Alhambra, California, at age 81 years, 217 days. He is interred at Rose Hills Memorial Park in Whittier, California. Hale Road in Knoxville is named after him.

U.S. House of Representatives
Preceded by Henry R. Gibson	Member of the U.S. House of Representatives from Tennessee's 2nd congressional district 1905-1909	Succeeded by Richard W. Austin
