= Jamie Woodson =

American politician (born 1972)

Member of the Tennessee Senate from the 6th district
- In office January 11, 2005 – July 2, 2011
- Preceded by: Ben Atchley
- Succeeded by: Sue Atchley

Member of the Tennessee House of Representatives from the 17th district
- In office January 12, 1999 – January 11, 2005
- Preceded by: Wayne Ritchie
- Succeeded by: Frank Niceley

Personal details
- Born: March 6, 1972 (age 54)
- Party: Republican
- Spouse(s): Jeff Hagood (div.) Bill Woodson (m. 2005)
- Children: 3
- Education: University of Tennessee (BA, JD)
- Website: Senate website

Jamie Roberts Woodson (born March 6, 1972) is an American politician who served as a state senator in the Tennessee General Assembly from 2005 to 2011 and was Speaker Pro Tem and Chairman of the Senate Education Committee. She also served three two-year terms in the Tennessee House of Representatives from 1999 to 2005.

== Biography ==
She attended the University of Tennessee (UT) in Knoxville and graduated with a Bachelor of Arts degree and a J.D. She was a member of Alpha Omicron Pi sorority while she was at UT. She was admitted to the Tennessee Bar and works as an attorney. Her first marriage was to Jeff Hagood, whose surname she used during the first several years of her political career.

She won election to a two-year term in the Tennessee House of Representatives in 1998 as a Republican, representing the 17th State House District. She won re-election in 2000 and 2002, serving in the 101st through 103rd General Assemblies. In 2004 she was elected to a four-year term in the state senate.

In summer 2005, she was married to Knoxville lawyer William (Bill) Woodson Jr., at the couple's farm "Horse Fly Farm." Upon her marriage, she assumed her new husband's last name. She has three stepchildren: Joseph, Elizabeth, and Caitlin.

Woodson represented the 6th district in the Tennessee Senate. The district at the time comprised the majority of Knox County. After her first term in the state senate, she was re-elected in 2008 to a second four-year term. In January 2009 she was elected Speaker Pro-Tem for the 106th General Assembly (2009–2010).

During the 105th General Assembly (2007–2008) she served as the Secretary of the Senate Republican Caucus, as the chair of the Senate Education Committee, and as a member of the Senate Judiciary Committee and the Senate Transportation Committee. In 2007 she sponsored legislation that resulted in a major revision to Tennessee's K-12 education funding formula, creating Basic Education Program 2.0, often known as BEP 2.0. She also helped lead efforts to improve education, including to identify and support effective teaching, raise academic standards for Tennessee students, turn around low-performing schools, and expand high-quality public charter schools in Tennessee.

In April 2011, Woodson announced that she would resign her Senate seat after the 2011 session of the General Assembly. She then became the head of SCORE, an education reform organization started by former U.S. Senator Bill Frist. SCORE focuses on achieving three student achievement goals for Tennessee: being among the fastest-improving states and ranked in the top half of states in student achievement on the National Assessment of Educational Progress by 2020; closing student achievement gaps at every grade level and in all subject areas by income, race, geographic location, and student need; and preparing every Tennessee student to graduate ready for postsecondary education and the workforce.

Woodson also serves on the Tennessee Fish & Wildlife Commission and the boards of the Governor's Foundation for Health and Wellness, Tennessee Business Roundtable, and the Policy Innovators in Education (PIE) Network.
