= Leonidas C. Houk =

American politician (1836–1891)

Leonidas Campbell Houk
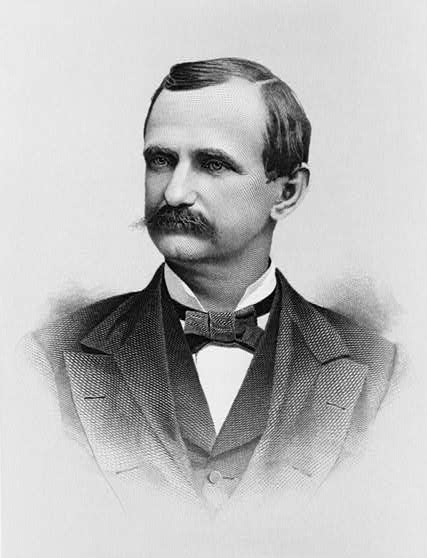

Member of the U.S. House of Representatives from Tennessee's 2nd district
- In office March 4, 1879 – May 25, 1891
- Preceded by: Jacob Montgomery Thornburgh
- Succeeded by: John C. Houk

Personal details
- Born: June 8, 1836 Boyds Creek, Tennessee, U.S.
- Died: May 25, 1891 (aged 54) Knoxville, Tennessee, U.S.
- Resting place: Old Gray Cemetery; Knoxville, Tennessee
- Party: Republican
- Spouse(s): Elizabeth Smith; Mary Belle Von Rosen
- Profession: Politician, Lawyer

Leonidas Campbell Houk (June 8, 1836 – May 25, 1891) was a lawyer who served in the United States House of Representatives for the 2nd congressional district of Tennessee. Between 1878 and 1891, Houk was elected to seven consecutive terms in the House, during which time he helped solidify the Republican congressional dominance in East Tennessee that remains to the present day. Houk fought for the Union Army during the Civil War, and rose to the rank of colonel within a few months. Largely self-trained as a lawyer, Houk served as a state circuit court judge from 1866 to 1869.

== Biography ==
=== Early life ===
Houk was born near Boyds Creek, Tennessee in Sevier County on June 8, 1836. He lost his father at a young age, and grew up in poverty. Although he attended local schools for less than three months, he managed to educate himself by reading books. He eventually learned the trade of cabinet-making, and worked in this trade for several years in Clinton, Tennessee.

In 1853, Houk was charged in Maryville with shooting a gun near a public road. At his trial, Knoxville lawyer Oliver Perry Temple (1820–1907), who happened to be in the courtroom, arose and spoke on Houk's behalf, and convinced the judge to grant Houk leniency. As a result of this incident, Houk became interested in law, and began making regular stops by Temple's Gay Street office to borrow books on law and legal theory. In 1859, Houk was admitted to the bar, and commenced practice in Clinton.

=== Civil War ===
Like most rural East Tennesseans, Houk supported the Union during the Civil War. In 1861, Houk engaged prominent secessionist Henry S. Foote in a debate in Clinton, and in June of that year he represented Anderson County at the East Tennessee Convention, which sought to create a separate, Union-aligned state in East Tennessee. In August 1861, Houk travelled to Kentucky, where he enlisted in the Union Army as a private.

On February 5, 1862, Houk was named colonel of the Third Tennessee Volunteer Infantry. In August of that year, Houk's regiment was vastly outnumbered and nearly surrounded by Confederate forces at London, Kentucky. Rather than surrender, Houk led his men on a brutal retreat over back roads and mountain passes to safety. As a result of this retreat, his health deteriorated, and he was forced to retire from the army on April 23, 1863. He spent the remainder of the war writing articles in support of the Union. He defended the Emancipation Proclamation, and served as a presidential elector for the Republican ticket in 1864.

=== Postwar activities ===
Houk first ran for the 2nd District's congressional seat in 1865, but lost to Horace Maynard. In March 1866, however, he was elected circuit court judge of Tennessee's 17th judicial district. At first, Houk supported the policies of Radical Republican governor William G. Brownlow, including a bill that disfranchised former Confederate officers, and a bill giving African-Americans in the state the right to vote. However, after a particularly bitter defeat against Maynard (a Brownlow ally) for the Republican nomination during the congressional election of 1868, Houk began distancing himself from the Brownlow regime.

Houk resigned from the bench in 1869 and moved to Knoxville, where he formed a successful law firm with Henry R. Gibson. In 1872, he was elected to the Tennessee state legislature, but served just one term. He again sought his party's nomination for Congress in 1874 against Jacob Thornburgh (Maynard had been gerrymandered out of the district in 1872), but withdrew after another particularly divisive campaign.

==== The Houk Machine ====
A member of the Stalwart faction in the House, Houk supported Grant in his run for a third non-consecutive presidential term in 1880 election. He also expressed sympathy for the struggles of poor farmers, reflecting a populist bent in his district due to the mountainous geographic nature stifling development and thus contributing to poverty.

Largely focusing on local as opposed to national issues, Houk emphasized constituents services and provided aid to veterans. He managed to consolidate political power within the state GOP, subsequently gaining control of patronage. This ultimately led to an alliance with some Democrats in the state, which elicited substantial criticisms.

After Thornburgh retired in 1878, Houk finally gained the Republican nomination for Congress, narrowly defeating Knoxville Chronicle editor William Rule, and was elected to the Forty-sixth Congress later that year. Sensing that East Tennesseans were weary of national issues, Houk focused on local concerns, namely veterans' issues and the demand for federal government seed. He was chairman of the House Committee on War Claims during the Forty-seventh congress, and went to great lengths to get compensation for East Tennessee Unionists who suffered property damage during the war.

In 1881, Houk thwarted Rule's attempt to become Knoxville's postmaster, and instead helped his old mentor Oliver P. Temple get the appointment. An enraged Rule ran against Houk for the Republican nomination, and after a hostile campaign, both claimed the nomination and ran against one another in the general election. Houk won handily, and afterward ran virtually unopposed for four subsequent terms. During this period, he went to considerable lengths to broaden the party's reach beyond its radical roots. With Brownlow and the party's older leaders dead or retired, Houk became the leader of Tennessee's Republicans, and thus controlled the party's presidential patronage.

Like nearly all Stalwarts, Houk ultimately caved into supporting civil service reform as a means of compromise in the 1880s, voting for the Pendleton Civil Service Reform Act in 1883 which ended the traditional spoils system Republicans utilized in the post-war Reconstruction period.

By the late-1880s, Houk had formed an unspoken alliance with the state's Democrats (who now dominated state politics) in which he traded federal influence during Republican presidencies for a say in state affairs. In 1888, however, Henry Clay Evans, who disliked what he perceived as Houk's subservience to state Democrats, captured the 3rd District's House seat, and immediately began fighting with Houk over distribution of patronage. Although the 3rd District was gerrymandered to ensure Evans's defeat in 1890, he and Houk continued bickering over patronage and political appointments, and after Houk's death, his son, John C. Houk, struggled with Evans for several years for control of the state Republican Party.

=== Death ===
On May 24, 1891, Houk accidentally drank a bottle of arsenic solution at DePue's drug store in Knoxville, which he mistook for a glass of ice water, and died in pain the following day. He was interred in Old Gray Cemetery. Houk's son, John Chiles Houk, succeeded him as the 2nd District's congressman. The younger Houk held the seat until 1895, and continued to play a role in East Tennessee politics into the 20th century.

Houk's broadening of the Republican platform solidified Republican control of East Tennessee's 1st and 2nd congressional districts. As of 2022, no Democrat has been elected to Congress in either district since Houk's day.

== See also ==
- List of members of the United States Congress who died in office (1790–1899)

U.S. House of Representatives
| Preceded by Jacob M. Thornburgh | Member of the U.S. House of Representatives from Tennessee's 2nd congressional district March 4, 1879 – May 25, 1891 | Succeeded by John C. Houk |
