= Tennessee's 2nd congressional district =

U.S. House district for Tennessee

Coordinates: 36°03′01″N 83°49′16″W

- Interactive map of district boundaries
- Representative: Tim Burchett; R–Knoxville
- Distribution: 74.15% urban; 25.85% rural
- Population (2025): 826,173
- Median household income: $78,629
- Ethnicity: 82.1% White; 5.8% Black; 5.4% Hispanic; 4.2% Two or more races; 1.8% Asian; 0.6% other
- Cook PVI: R+17

The 2nd congressional district of Tennessee is a congressional district in East Tennessee. It has been represented by Republican Tim Burchett since January 2019. Although the district has taken many forms over the years, it has been centered on Knoxville since 1853. During the American Civil War era, the area was represented in Congress by Horace Maynard. Maynard switched parties many times but was pro-U.S. and did not resign from Congress when Tennessee seceded. Maynard entered Congress in 1857 (four years before the outbreak of the war) but did not leave entirely until 1875 (ten years after the war ended).

In the 1964 election, the district chose Knoxville mayor John Duncan, Sr. Duncan served for 23 years before he died in the summer of 1988. Following Duncan's death, the district elected his son, Jimmy. The younger Duncan served for over thirty years from late 1988 until his successor was sworn in early January 2019. Upon Jimmy Duncan's retirement, the district chose outgoing Knox County mayor Tim Burchett, who has served since January 2019.

The few Democratic pockets in the district are located in Knoxville, which has elected Democratic mayors consecutively since 2011, and sends Democratic legislators to the Tennessee General Assembly. However, they are no match for the overwhelming Republican bent of the rest of Knox County and the more suburban and rural areas. For example, Blount, Jefferson, and Grainger Counties are among the few counties in the country to have never supported a Democrat for president since the Civil War.

This district traditionally gives its members of Congress very long tenures in Washington, electing some of the few truly senior Southern Republican members before the 1950s. Since 1909, only seven people (not counting caretakers) have represented the district – Richard W. Austin, J. Will Taylor, John Jennings Jr., Howard Baker Sr., John Duncan Sr., Jimmy Duncan, and Burchett. All six of Burchett's predecessors have served at least ten years in Congress, with Taylor and the Duncans holding the seat for at least twenty years.

== Current boundaries ==
The district is located in East Tennessee and borders Kentucky and Virginia to the north and North Carolina to the south. For the 118th and successive Congresses (based on redistricting following the 2020 census), it contains all or portions of the following counties and communities:

Blount County (11)

All 11 communities

Campbell County (3)

Fincastle, Jellico, LaFollete (part; also 3rd)

Claiborne County (4)

All 4 communities

Grainger County (3)

All 3 communities

Jefferson County (1)

Strawberry Plains

Knox County (7)

All 7 communities

Loudon County (7)

All 7 communities

Union County (3)

All 3 communities

Due to three county island parcels near Sweetwater, Tennessee, the district is not geographically contiguous — rather it is politically contiguous, with county exclaves "connected" despite being entirely-surrounded by Tennessee's 3rd congressional district.

== History ==
The district is based in Knoxville and is largely coextensive with that city's metropolitan area. The area is known for being the home of the flagship campus for the University of Tennessee, hosting the 1982 World's Fair, and for being the headquarters for the Tennessee Valley Authority, Ruby Tuesday, and Pilot Flying J.

The 2nd is similar in character to the neighboring 1st. It has long been one of the safest districts in the nation for the Republican Party. No Democrat has represented the district since 1855, and Republicans have held the district continuously since 1867 — the longest time any party has retained any district. The Democrats waged some competitive races in the district during the 1930s. However, they have not put up a substantive candidate since 1964 and have only managed 40 percent of the vote twice since then.

Most of its residents supported the United States over the Confederacy during the American Civil War; it was one of four districts whose members of Congress did not resign when Tennessee declared secession from the United States in 1861. The area's residents immediately identified with the Republicans after hostilities ceased. Much of that sentiment was derived from the region's economic base of small-scale farming, with little or no use for slavery; thus, voters were mostly indifferent or hostile to the concerns of plantation owners and other landed interests farther west in the state, who aligned themselves with the Democratic Party. This loyalty has persisted through good times and bad ever since, despite the vast ideological changes in both political parties since that time.

== Recent election results from statewide races ==
Year	Office	Results
2008	President	McCain 64% - 34%
2012	President	Romney 69% - 31%
2016	President	Trump 65% - 30%
2018	Senate	Blackburn 57% - 42%
2018	Governor	Lee 63% - 35%
2020	President	Trump 64% - 34%
2020	Senate	Hagerty 66% - 32%
2022	Governor	Lee 67% - 31%
2024	President	Trump 66% - 32%
2024	Senate	Blackburn 65% - 33%

== List of members representing the district ==
Member	Party	Years	Cong ress	Electoral history	District location
District established March 4, 1805
George W. Campbell (Nashville)	Democratic-Republican	March 4, 1805 – March 3, 1809	9th 10th	Redistricted from the at-large district and re-elected in 1805. Re-elected in 1807. Retired to become judge of the Tennessee Supreme Court.	1805–1813 "Hamilton district"
Robert Weakley (Nashville)	Democratic-Republican	March 4, 1809 – March 3, 1811		Elected in 1809. Retired.	1805–1813 "Hamilton district"
John Sevier (Knoxville)	Democratic-Republican	March 4, 1811 – September 24, 1815	12th 13th 14th	Elected in 1811. Re-elected in 1813. Re-elected in 1815. Died.	1805–1813 "Hamilton district"
John Sevier (Knoxville)	Democratic-Republican	March 4, 1811 – September 24, 1815	12th 13th 14th	Elected in 1811. Re-elected in 1813. Re-elected in 1815. Died.	1813–1823 [data missing]
Vacant		September 24, 1815 – December 8, 1815			1813–1823 [data missing]
William G. Blount (Knoxville)	Democratic-Republican	December 8, 1815 – March 3, 1819	14th 15th	Elected to finish Sevier's term. Re-elected in 1817. Retired.	1813–1823 [data missing]
John A. Cocke (Rutledge)	Democratic-Republican (Note: Supported the Jackson faction in the 1824 United States presidential election)	March 4, 1819 – March 3, 1825	16th 17th 18th 19th	Elected in 1819. Re-elected in 1821. Re-elected in 1823. Re-elected in 1825. Retired.	1813–1823 [data missing]
John A. Cocke (Rutledge)	Democratic-Republican	March 4, 1819 – March 3, 1825	16th 17th 18th 19th	Elected in 1819. Re-elected in 1821. Re-elected in 1823. Re-elected in 1825. Retired.	1823–1833 [data missing]
John A. Cocke (Rutledge)	Jacksonian	March 4, 1825 – March 3, 1827	16th 17th 18th 19th	Elected in 1819. Re-elected in 1821. Re-elected in 1823. Re-elected in 1825. Retired.	1823–1833 [data missing]
Pryor Lea (Knoxville)	Jacksonian	March 4, 1827 – March 3, 1831	20th 21st	Elected in 1827. Re-elected in 1829. Lost re-election.	1823–1833 [data missing]
Thomas D. Arnold (Campbell Station)	Anti-Jacksonian	March 4, 1831 – March 3, 1833		Elected in 1831. Redistricted to the 1st district and lost re-election.	1823–1833 [data missing]
Samuel Bunch (Rutledge)	Jacksonian	March 4, 1833 – March 3, 1835	23rd 24th	Elected in 1833. Re-elected in 1835. Lost re-election.	1833–1843 [data missing]
Samuel Bunch (Rutledge)	Anti-Jacksonian	March 4, 1835 – March 3, 1837	23rd 24th	Elected in 1833. Re-elected in 1835. Lost re-election.	1833–1843 [data missing]
Abraham McClellan (Blountville)	Democratic	March 4, 1837 – March 3, 1843	25th 26th 27th	Elected in 1837. Re-elected in 1839. Re-elected in 1841. Retired.	1833–1843 [data missing]
William T. Senter (Panther Springs)	Whig	March 4, 1843 – March 3, 1845		Elected in 1842. Retired.	1843–1853 [data missing]
William M. Cocke (Rutledge)	Whig	March 4, 1845 – March 3, 1849	29th 30th	Elected in 1845. Re-elected in 1847. Lost re-election as a Democrat.	1843–1853 [data missing]
Albert G. Watkins (Panther Springs)	Whig	March 4, 1849 – March 3, 1853	31st 32nd	Elected in 1849. Re-elected in 1851. Redistricted to the 1st district and lost re-election.	1843–1853 [data missing]
William M. Churchwell (Knoxville)	Democratic	March 4, 1853 – March 3, 1855		Redistricted from the 3rd district and re-elected in 1853. Retired.	1853–1863 [data missing]
William H. Sneed (Knoxville)	Know Nothing	March 4, 1855 – March 3, 1857		Elected in 1855. Retired.	1853–1863 [data missing]
Horace Maynard (Knoxville)	Know Nothing	March 4, 1857 – March 3, 1859	35th 36th 37th	Elected in 1857. Re-elected in 1859. Re-elected in 1861. Could not seek re-election, as state was under Confederate occupation.	1853–1863 [data missing]
Horace Maynard (Knoxville)	Opposition	March 4, 1859 – March 3, 1861	35th 36th 37th	Elected in 1857. Re-elected in 1859. Re-elected in 1861. Could not seek re-election, as state was under Confederate occupation.	1853–1863 [data missing]
Horace Maynard (Knoxville)	Union	March 4, 1861 – March 3, 1863	35th 36th 37th	Elected in 1857. Re-elected in 1859. Re-elected in 1861. Could not seek re-election, as state was under Confederate occupation.	1853–1863 [data missing]
District inactive		March 4, 1863 – July 24, 1866	38th 39th	Civil War and Reconstruction	
Horace Maynard (Knoxville)	Unconditional Union	July 24, 1866 – March 3, 1867	39th 40th 41st 42nd	Elected in 1865. Re-elected in 1867. Re-elected in 1868. Re-elected in 1870. Redistricted to the at-large district.	1866–1873 [data missing]
Horace Maynard (Knoxville)	Republican	March 4, 1867 – March 3, 1873	39th 40th 41st 42nd	Elected in 1865. Re-elected in 1867. Re-elected in 1868. Re-elected in 1870. Redistricted to the at-large district.	1866–1873 [data missing]
Jacob M. Thornburgh (Knoxville)	Republican	March 4, 1873 – March 3, 1879	43rd 44th 45th	Elected in 1872. Re-elected in 1874. Re-elected in 1876. Retired.	1873–1883 [data missing]
Leonidas C. Houk (Knoxville)	Republican	March 4, 1879 – May 25, 1891	46th 47th 48th 49th 50th 51st 52nd	Elected in 1878. Re-elected in 1880. Re-elected in 1882. Re-elected in 1884. Re-elected in 1886. Re-elected in 1888. Re-elected in 1890. Died.	1873–1883 [data missing]
Leonidas C. Houk (Knoxville)	Republican	March 4, 1879 – May 25, 1891	46th 47th 48th 49th 50th 51st 52nd	Elected in 1878. Re-elected in 1880. Re-elected in 1882. Re-elected in 1884. Re-elected in 1886. Re-elected in 1888. Re-elected in 1890. Died.	1883–1893 [data missing]
Vacant		May 25, 1891 – December 7, 1891			1883–1893 [data missing]
John C. Houk (Knoxville)	Republican	December 7, 1891 – March 3, 1895	52nd 53rd	Elected to finish his father's term. Re-elected in 1892. Lost renomination and lost re-election as an Independent Republican.	1883–1893 [data missing]
John C. Houk (Knoxville)	Republican	December 7, 1891 – March 3, 1895	52nd 53rd	Elected to finish his father's term. Re-elected in 1892. Lost renomination and lost re-election as an Independent Republican.	1893–1903 [data missing]
Henry R. Gibson (Knoxville)	Republican	March 4, 1895 – March 3, 1905	54th 55th 56th 57th 58th	Elected in 1894. Re-elected in 1896. Re-elected in 1898. Re-elected in 1900. Re-elected in 1902. Retired.	1893–1903 [data missing]
Henry R. Gibson (Knoxville)	Republican	March 4, 1895 – March 3, 1905	54th 55th 56th 57th 58th	Elected in 1894. Re-elected in 1896. Re-elected in 1898. Re-elected in 1900. Re-elected in 1902. Retired.	1903–1913 [data missing]
Nathan W. Hale (Knoxville)	Republican	March 4, 1905 – March 3, 1909	59th 60th	Elected in 1904. Re-elected in 1906. Lost re-election.	1903–1913 [data missing]
Richard W. Austin (Knoxville)	Republican	March 4, 1909 – March 3, 1919	61st 62nd 63rd 64th 65th	Elected in 1908. Re-elected in 1910. Re-elected in 1912. Re-elected in 1914. Re-elected in 1916. Lost renomination and lost re-election as an independent.	1903–1913 [data missing]
Richard W. Austin (Knoxville)	Republican	March 4, 1909 – March 3, 1919	61st 62nd 63rd 64th 65th	Elected in 1908. Re-elected in 1910. Re-elected in 1912. Re-elected in 1914. Re-elected in 1916. Lost renomination and lost re-election as an independent.	1913–1923 [data missing]
J. Will Taylor (LaFollette)	Republican	March 4, 1919 – November 14, 1939	66th 67th 68th 69th 70th 71st 72nd 73rd 74th 75th 76th	Elected in 1918. Re-elected in 1920. Re-elected in 1922. Re-elected in 1924. Re-elected in 1926. Re-elected in 1928. Re-elected in 1930. Re-elected in 1932. Re-elected in 1934. Re-elected in 1936. Re-elected in 1938. Died.	1913–1923 [data missing]
J. Will Taylor (LaFollette)	Republican	March 4, 1919 – November 14, 1939	66th 67th 68th 69th 70th 71st 72nd 73rd 74th 75th 76th	Elected in 1918. Re-elected in 1920. Re-elected in 1922. Re-elected in 1924. Re-elected in 1926. Re-elected in 1928. Re-elected in 1930. Re-elected in 1932. Re-elected in 1934. Re-elected in 1936. Re-elected in 1938. Died.	1923–1933 [data missing]
J. Will Taylor (LaFollette)	Republican	March 4, 1919 – November 14, 1939	66th 67th 68th 69th 70th 71st 72nd 73rd 74th 75th 76th	Elected in 1918. Re-elected in 1920. Re-elected in 1922. Re-elected in 1924. Re-elected in 1926. Re-elected in 1928. Re-elected in 1930. Re-elected in 1932. Re-elected in 1934. Re-elected in 1936. Re-elected in 1938. Died.	1933–1943 [data missing]
Vacant		November 14, 1939 – December 30, 1939			1933–1943 [data missing]
John Jennings Jr. (Knoxville)	Republican	December 30, 1939 – January 3, 1951	76th 77th 78th 79th 80th 81st	Elected to finish Taylor's term. Re-elected in 1940. Re-elected in 1942. Re-elected in 1944. Re-elected in 1946. Re-elected in 1948. Lost renomination.	1933–1943 [data missing]
John Jennings Jr. (Knoxville)	Republican	December 30, 1939 – January 3, 1951	76th 77th 78th 79th 80th 81st	Elected to finish Taylor's term. Re-elected in 1940. Re-elected in 1942. Re-elected in 1944. Re-elected in 1946. Re-elected in 1948. Lost renomination.	1943–1953 [data missing]
Howard H. Baker (Knoxville)	Republican	January 3, 1951 – January 7, 1964	82nd 83rd 84th 85th 86th 87th 88th	Elected in 1950. Re-elected in 1952. Re-elected in 1954. Re-elected in 1956. Re-elected in 1958. Re-elected in 1960. Re-elected in 1962. Died.	1943–1953 [data missing]
Howard H. Baker (Knoxville)	Republican	January 3, 1951 – January 7, 1964	82nd 83rd 84th 85th 86th 87th 88th	Elected in 1950. Re-elected in 1952. Re-elected in 1954. Re-elected in 1956. Re-elected in 1958. Re-elected in 1960. Re-elected in 1962. Died.	1953–1963 [data missing]
Howard H. Baker (Knoxville)	Republican	January 3, 1951 – January 7, 1964	82nd 83rd 84th 85th 86th 87th 88th	Elected in 1950. Re-elected in 1952. Re-elected in 1954. Re-elected in 1956. Re-elected in 1958. Re-elected in 1960. Re-elected in 1962. Died.	1963–1973 [data missing]
Vacant		January 7, 1964 – March 10, 1964			1963–1973 [data missing]
Irene Baker (Knoxville)	Republican	March 10, 1964 – January 3, 1965		Elected to finish her husband's term. Retired.	1963–1973 [data missing]
John Duncan Sr. (Knoxville)	Republican	January 3, 1965 – June 21, 1988	89th 90th 91st 92nd 93rd 94th 95th 96th 97th 98th 99th 100th	Elected in 1964. Re-elected in 1966. Re-elected in 1968. Re-elected in 1970. Re-elected in 1972. Re-elected in 1974. Re-elected in 1976. Re-elected in 1978. Re-elected in 1980. Re-elected in 1982. Re-elected in 1984. Re-elected in 1986. Died.	1963–1973 [data missing]
John Duncan Sr. (Knoxville)	Republican	January 3, 1965 – June 21, 1988	89th 90th 91st 92nd 93rd 94th 95th 96th 97th 98th 99th 100th	Elected in 1964. Re-elected in 1966. Re-elected in 1968. Re-elected in 1970. Re-elected in 1972. Re-elected in 1974. Re-elected in 1976. Re-elected in 1978. Re-elected in 1980. Re-elected in 1982. Re-elected in 1984. Re-elected in 1986. Died.	1973–1983 [data missing]
John Duncan Sr. (Knoxville)	Republican	January 3, 1965 – June 21, 1988	89th 90th 91st 92nd 93rd 94th 95th 96th 97th 98th 99th 100th	Elected in 1964. Re-elected in 1966. Re-elected in 1968. Re-elected in 1970. Re-elected in 1972. Re-elected in 1974. Re-elected in 1976. Re-elected in 1978. Re-elected in 1980. Re-elected in 1982. Re-elected in 1984. Re-elected in 1986. Died.	1983–1993 [data missing]
Vacant		June 21, 1988 – November 8, 1988			1983–1993 [data missing]
Jimmy Duncan (Knoxville)	Republican	November 8, 1988 – January 3, 2019	100th 101st 102nd 103rd 104th 105th 106th 107th 108th 109th 110th 111th 112th 113th 114th 115th	Elected to finish his father's term. Also elected to the next full term. Re-elected in 1990. Re-elected in 1992. Re-elected in 1994. Re-elected in 1996. Re-elected in 1998. Re-elected in 2000. Re-elected in 2002. Re-elected in 2004. Re-elected in 2006. Re-elected in 2008. Re-elected in 2010. Re-elected in 2012. Re-elected in 2014. Re-elected in 2016. Retired.	1983–1993 [data missing]
Jimmy Duncan (Knoxville)	Republican	November 8, 1988 – January 3, 2019	100th 101st 102nd 103rd 104th 105th 106th 107th 108th 109th 110th 111th 112th 113th 114th 115th	Elected to finish his father's term. Also elected to the next full term. Re-elected in 1990. Re-elected in 1992. Re-elected in 1994. Re-elected in 1996. Re-elected in 1998. Re-elected in 2000. Re-elected in 2002. Re-elected in 2004. Re-elected in 2006. Re-elected in 2008. Re-elected in 2010. Re-elected in 2012. Re-elected in 2014. Re-elected in 2016. Retired.	1993–2003 [data missing]
Jimmy Duncan (Knoxville)	Republican	November 8, 1988 – January 3, 2019	100th 101st 102nd 103rd 104th 105th 106th 107th 108th 109th 110th 111th 112th 113th 114th 115th	Elected to finish his father's term. Also elected to the next full term. Re-elected in 1990. Re-elected in 1992. Re-elected in 1994. Re-elected in 1996. Re-elected in 1998. Re-elected in 2000. Re-elected in 2002. Re-elected in 2004. Re-elected in 2006. Re-elected in 2008. Re-elected in 2010. Re-elected in 2012. Re-elected in 2014. Re-elected in 2016. Retired.	2003–2013
Jimmy Duncan (Knoxville)	Republican	November 8, 1988 – January 3, 2019	100th 101st 102nd 103rd 104th 105th 106th 107th 108th 109th 110th 111th 112th 113th 114th 115th	Elected to finish his father's term. Also elected to the next full term. Re-elected in 1990. Re-elected in 1992. Re-elected in 1994. Re-elected in 1996. Re-elected in 1998. Re-elected in 2000. Re-elected in 2002. Re-elected in 2004. Re-elected in 2006. Re-elected in 2008. Re-elected in 2010. Re-elected in 2012. Re-elected in 2014. Re-elected in 2016. Retired.	2013–2023
Tim Burchett (Knoxville)	Republican	January 3, 2019 – present	116th 117th 118th 119th	Elected in 2018. Re-elected in 2020. Re-elected in 2022. Re-elected in 2024. Re-elected in 2026.	2013–2023
Tim Burchett (Knoxville)	Republican	January 3, 2019 – present	116th 117th 118th 119th	Elected in 2018. Re-elected in 2020. Re-elected in 2022. Re-elected in 2024. Re-elected in 2026.	2023–2027

== Recent election results ==
=== 2012 ===
Tennessee's 2nd congressional district, 2012
Party	Candidate	Votes	%
Republican	John J. Duncan, Jr. (incumbent)	196,894	74.4
Democratic	Troy Goodale	54,522	20.6
Green	Norris Dryer	5,733	2.2
Libertarian	Greg Samples	4,382	1.7
Independent	Brandon Stewart	2,974	1.1
Total votes		264,505	100
Republican hold			

=== 2014 ===
Tennessee's 2nd congressional district, 2014
Party	Candidate	Votes	%
Republican	John J. Duncan, Jr. (incumbent)	120,833	72.5
Democratic	Bob Scott	37,612	22.6
Green	Norris Dryer	4,033	2.4
Independent	Casey Adam Gouge	4,223	2.5
Total votes		166,701	100.0
Republican hold			

=== 2016 ===
Tennessee's 2nd congressional district, 2016
Party	Candidate	Votes	%
Republican	John J. Duncan, Jr. (incumbent)	212,455	75.6
Democratic	Stuart Starr	68,401	24.4
Total votes		280,856	100.0
Republican hold			

=== 2018 ===
Tennessee's 2nd congressional district, 2018
Party	Candidate	Votes	%
Republican	Tim Burchett	172,856	65.9
Democratic	Renee Hoyos	86,668	33.1
Independent	Greg Samples	967	0.4
Independent	Jeffrey Grunau	657	0.3
Independent	Marc Whitmire	637	0.2
Independent	Keith LaTorre	349	0.1
Total votes		262,134	100.0
Republican hold			

=== 2020 ===
Tennessee's 2nd congressional district, 2020
Party	Candidate	Votes	%
Republican	Tim Burchett (incumbent)	238,907	67.6
Democratic	Renee Hoyos	109,684	31.1
Independent	Matthew Campbell	4,592	1.3
Write-in		14	0.0
Total votes		353,197	100.0
Republican hold			

=== 2022 ===
Tennessee's 2nd congressional district, 2022
Party	Candidate	Votes	%
Republican	Tim Burchett (incumbent)	141,089	67.9
Democratic	Mark Harmon	66,673	32.0
Total votes		207,762	100.0
Republican hold			

=== 2024 ===
Tennessee's 2nd congressional district, 2024
Party	Candidate	Votes	%
Republican	Tim Burchett (incumbent)	250,782	69.26%
Democratic	Jane George	111,316	30.74%
Total votes		362,098	100.00%
Republican hold			

=== 2026 ===
Tennessee's 2nd congressional district, 2026
Party	Candidate	Votes	%
Republican	Tim Burchett (incumbent)	144,892	57.7%
Democratic	Michaela Barnett	103,311	41.2%
Independent	Bruce Fine	1,827	0.7%
Independent	Adam Heimerman	950	0.4%
Total votes		250,980	100.00%
Republican hold			

== See also ==
- Tennessee's congressional districts
- List of United States congressional districts
