= 52nd United States Congress =

1891-1893 U.S. Congress

←	51st	53rd	→
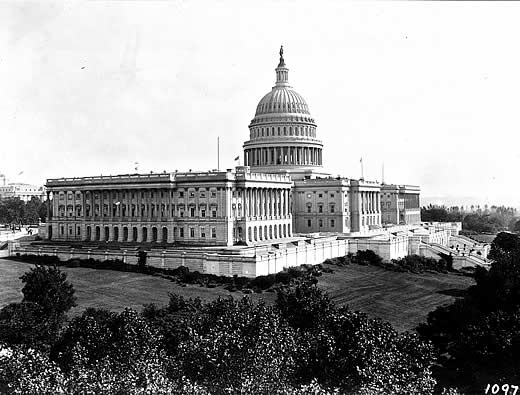
- United States Capitol (1906)

Overview
- Legislative body: United States Congress
- Jurisdiction: United States
- Term: March 4, 1891 – March 4, 1893

Senate
- Members: 88
- President: Levi P. Morton (R)
- President pro tempore: Charles F. Manderson (R)
- Party control: Republican

House of Representatives
- Members: 332 representatives 4 non-voting delegates
- Speaker: Charles F. Crisp (D)
- Party control: Democratic

Sessions
- 1st: December 7, 1891 – August 5, 1892
- 2nd: December 5, 1892 – March 3, 1893

The 52nd United States Congress was a meeting of the legislative branch of the United States federal government, consisting of the United States Senate and the United States House of Representatives. It met in Washington, D.C., from March 4, 1891, to March 4, 1893, during the final two years of Benjamin Harrison's presidency.

The apportionment of seats in the House of Representatives was based on the 1880 United States census.

The Republicans maintained a majority in the Senate (albeit reduced), but the Democrats won back the majority in the House, ending the Republican overall federal government trifecta.

== Major legislation ==
- May 5, 1892: Geary Act
- February 13, 1893: Harter Act (Carriage of Goods by Sea), ch. 105, 27 Stat. 445

== Party summary ==
The count below identifies party affiliations at the beginning of the first session of this Congress, and includes members from vacancies and newly admitted states, when they were first seated. Changes resulting from subsequent replacements are shown below in the "Changes in membership" section.

=== Senate ===
	Party (shading shows control)					Total	Vacant
	Democratic (D)	Populist (P)	Independent (I)	Republican (R)	Other	Total	Vacant
End of previous congress	35	0	0	51	0	86	2
Begin	36	1	1	46	0	84	4
End	39	2	0	47	0	88	0
Final voting share	44.3%	2.3%	0.0%	53.4%	0.0%		
Beginning of next congress	44	3	0	37	1 (Note: Silver)	85	3

=== House of Representatives ===
	Party (shading shows control)				Total	Vacant
	Democratic (D)	Populist (P)	Republican (R)	Other	Total	Vacant
End of previous congress	153	0	176	1	330	2
Begin	236	9	87	0	332	0
End	233	9	86	0	328	4
Final voting share	71.0%	2.7%	26.2%	0.0%		
Beginning of next congress	213	11	127	2 (Note: Independent Democratic, Silver)	353	3

== Leadership ==
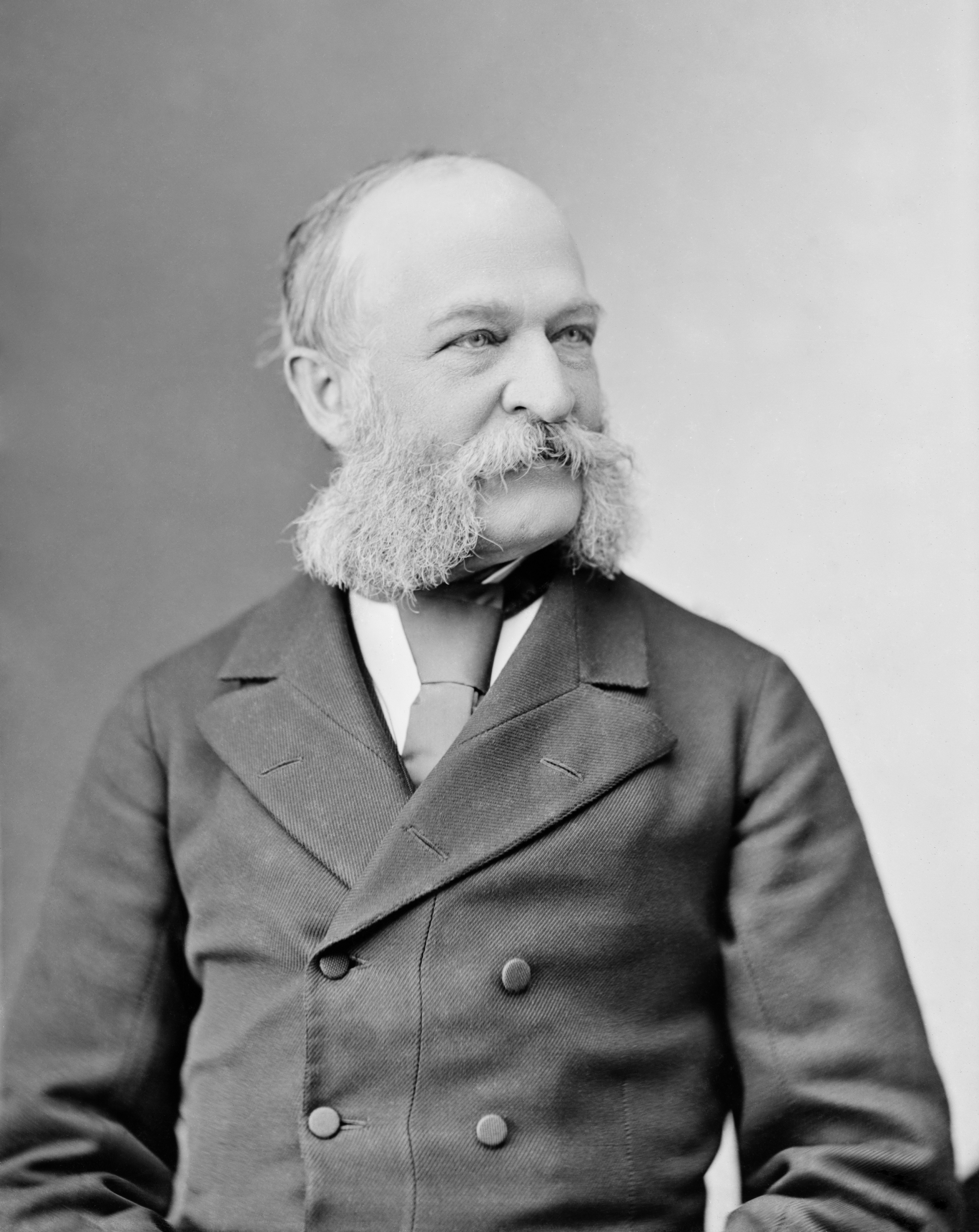
President of the Senate Levi P. Morton

=== Senate ===
- President: Levi P. Morton (R)
- President pro tempore: Charles F. Manderson (R)
- Republican Conference Chairman: John Sherman
- Democratic Caucus Chairman: Arthur P. Gorman

=== House of Representatives ===
- Speaker: Charles F. Crisp (D)
- Minority Leader: Thomas B. Reed
- Democratic Caucus Chairman: William S. Holman
- Republican Conference Chairman: Thomas J. Henderson
- Democratic Campaign Committee Chairman: Roswell P. Flower

== Members ==
This list is arranged by chamber, then by state. Senators are listed by class, and representatives are listed by district.

Skip to House of Representatives, below

=== Senate ===
Senators were elected by the state legislatures every two years, with one-third beginning new six-year terms with each Congress. Senators are listed by Senate class numbers, which indicate the cycle of their election. In this Congress, Class 1 meant their term ended with this Congress, requiring re-election in 1892; Class 2 meant their term began in the last Congress, requiring re-election in 1894; and Class 3 meant their term began in this Congress, requiring re-election in 1896.

==== Alabama ====
▌2. John T. Morgan (D)
▌3. James L. Pugh (D)

==== Arkansas ====
▌2. James H. Berry (D)
▌3. James K. Jones (D)

==== California ====
▌1. Charles N. Felton (R), from March 19, 1891
▌3. Leland Stanford (R)

==== Colorado ====
▌2. Edward O. Wolcott (R)
▌3. Henry M. Teller (R)

==== Connecticut ====
▌1. Joseph R. Hawley (R)
▌3. Orville H. Platt (R)

==== Delaware ====
▌1. George Gray (D)
▌2. Anthony Higgins (R)

==== Florida ====
▌1. Samuel Pasco (D)
▌3. Wilkinson Call (D), from May 26, 1891

==== Georgia ====
▌2. Alfred H. Colquitt (D)
▌3. John B. Gordon (D)

==== Idaho ====
▌2. George L. Shoup (R)
▌3. Fred T. Dubois (R)

==== Illinois ====
▌2. Shelby M. Cullom (R)
▌3. John McAuley Palmer (D)

==== Indiana ====
▌1. David Turpie (D)
▌3. Daniel W. Voorhees (D)

==== Iowa ====
▌2. James F. Wilson (R)
▌3. William B. Allison (R)

==== Kansas ====
▌2. Preston B. Plumb (R), until December 20, 1891

▌Bishop W. Perkins (R), from January 1, 1892

▌3. William A. Peffer (P)

==== Kentucky ====
▌2. John G. Carlisle (D), until February 4, 1893

▌William Lindsay (D), from February 15, 1893

▌3. Joseph C. S. Blackburn (D)

==== Louisiana ====
▌2. Randall L. Gibson (D), until December 15, 1892

▌Donelson Caffery (D), from December 31, 1892

▌3. Edward D. White Jr. (D)

==== Maine ====
▌1. Eugene Hale (R)
▌2. William P. Frye (R)

==== Maryland ====
▌1. Arthur Pue Gorman (D)
▌3. Charles H. Gibson (D), from November 19, 1891

==== Massachusetts ====
▌1. Henry L. Dawes (R)
▌2. George F. Hoar (R)

==== Michigan ====
▌1. Francis B. Stockbridge (R)
▌2. James McMillan (R)

==== Minnesota ====
▌1. Cushman K. Davis (R)
▌2. William D. Washburn (R)

==== Mississippi ====
▌1. James Z. George (D)
▌2. Edward C. Walthall (D)

==== Missouri ====
▌1. Francis Cockrell (D)
▌3. George G. Vest (D)

==== Montana ====
▌1. Wilbur F. Sanders (R)
▌2. Thomas C. Power (R)

==== Nebraska ====
▌1. Algernon S. Paddock (R)
▌2. Charles F. Manderson (R)

==== Nevada ====
▌1. William M. Stewart (R)
▌3. John P. Jones (R)

==== New Hampshire ====
▌2. William E. Chandler (R)
▌3. Jacob H. Gallinger (R)

==== New Jersey ====
▌1. Rufus Blodgett (D)
▌2. John R. McPherson (D)

==== New York ====
▌1. Frank Hiscock (R)
▌3. David B. Hill (D), from January 7, 1892

==== North Carolina ====
▌2. Matt W. Ransom (D)
▌3. Zebulon B. Vance (D)

==== North Dakota ====
▌1. Lyman R. Casey (R)
▌3. Henry C. Hansbrough (R)

==== Ohio ====
▌1. John Sherman (R)
▌3. Calvin S. Brice (D)

==== Oregon ====
▌2. Joseph N. Dolph (R)
▌3. John H. Mitchell (R)

==== Pennsylvania ====
▌1. Matthew S. Quay (R)
▌3. J. Donald Cameron (R)

==== Rhode Island ====
▌1. Nelson W. Aldrich (R)
▌2. Nathan F. Dixon III (R)

==== South Carolina ====
▌2. Matthew C. Butler (D)
▌3. John L. M. Irby (D)

==== South Dakota ====
▌2. Richard F. Pettigrew (R)
▌▌3. James H. Kyle (I, later P)

==== Tennessee ====
▌1. William B. Bate (D)
▌2. Isham G. Harris (D)

==== Texas ====
▌1. John H. Reagan (D), until June 10, 1891

▌Horace Chilton (D), from June 10, 1891, until March 22, 1892
▌Roger Q. Mills (D), from March 23, 1892

▌2. Richard Coke (D)

==== Vermont ====
▌1. George F. Edmunds (R), until November 1, 1891

▌Redfield Proctor (R), from November 2, 1891

▌3. Justin S. Morrill (R)

==== Virginia ====
▌1. John W. Daniel (D)
▌2. John S. Barbour Jr. (D), until May 14, 1892

▌Eppa Hunton, II (D), from May 28, 1892

==== Washington ====
▌1. John B. Allen (R)
▌3. Watson C. Squire (R)

==== West Virginia ====
▌1. Charles J. Faulkner Jr. (D)
▌2. John E. Kenna (D), until January 11, 1893

▌Johnson N. Camden (D), from January 25, 1893

==== Wisconsin ====
▌1. Philetus Sawyer (R)
▌3. William F. Vilas (D)

==== Wyoming ====
▌1. Francis E. Warren (R)
▌2. Joseph M. Carey (R)

Senators' party membership by state at the opening of the 52nd Congress in March 1891. The green stripes represent Populists. 2 Democrats 1 Democrat and 1 Republican 2 Republicans Territories

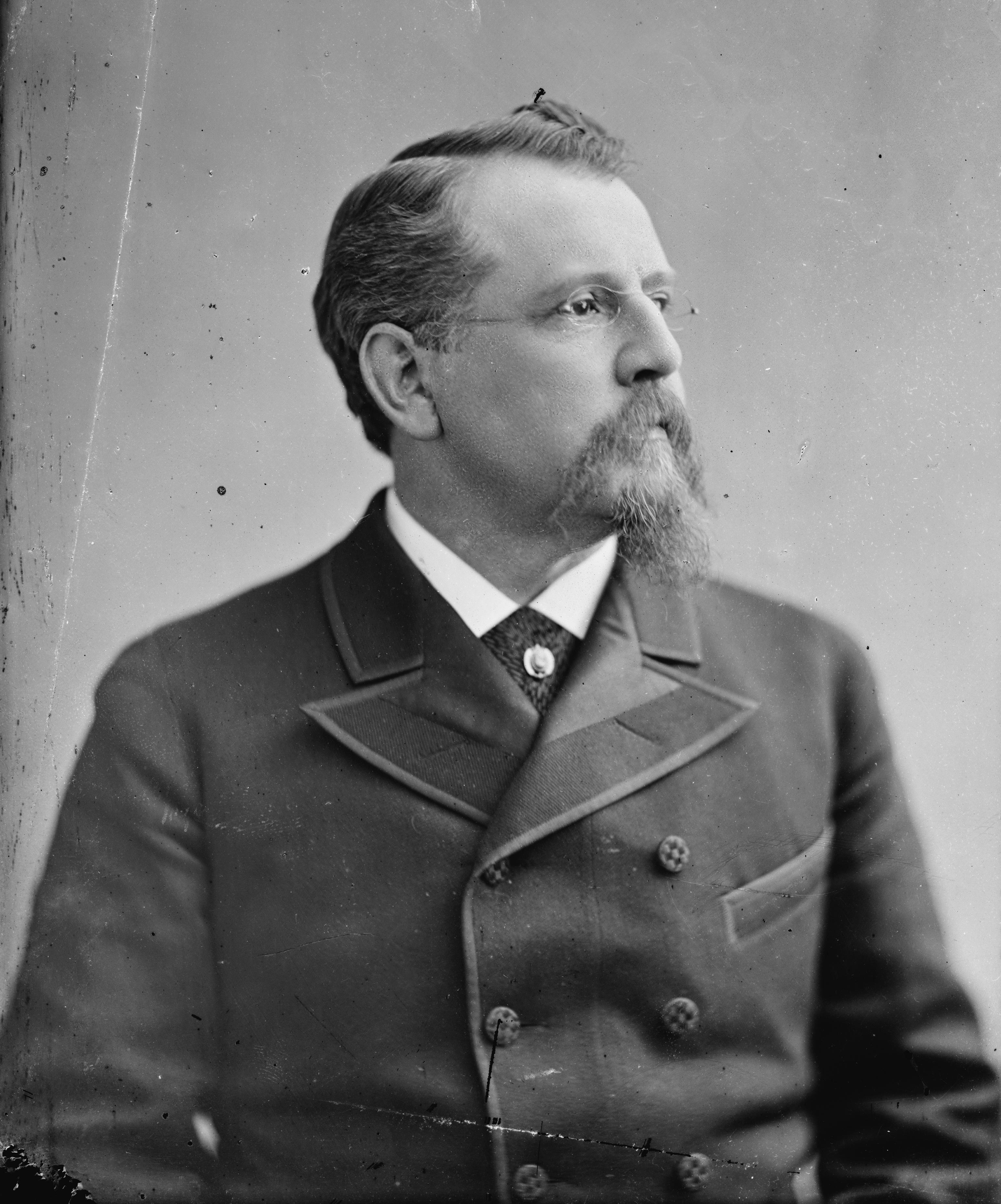
President pro tempore Charles F. Manderson

=== House of Representatives ===
Representatives are preceded by their district numbers.

==== Alabama ====
▌1. Richard H. Clarke (D)
▌2. Hilary A. Herbert (D)
▌3. William C. Oates (D)
▌4. Louis W. Turpin (D)
▌5. James E. Cobb (D)
▌6. John H. Bankhead (D)
▌7. William H. Forney (D)
▌8. Joseph Wheeler (D)

==== Arkansas ====
▌1. William H. Cate (D)
▌2. Clifton R. Breckinridge (D)
▌3. Thomas C. McRae (D)
▌4. William L. Terry (D)
▌5. Samuel W. Peel (D)

==== California ====
▌1. Thomas J. Geary (D)
▌2. Anthony Caminetti (D)
▌3. Joseph McKenna (R), until March 28, 1892

▌Samuel G. Hilborn (R), from December 5, 1892

▌4. John T. Cutting (R)
▌5. Eugene F. Loud (R)
▌6. William W. Bowers (R)

==== Colorado ====
▌At-large. Hosea Townsend (R)

==== Connecticut ====
▌1. Lewis Sperry (D)
▌2. Washington F. Willcox (D)
▌3. Charles A. Russell (R)
▌4. Robert E. De Forest (D)

==== Delaware ====
▌At-large. John W. Causey (D)

==== Florida ====
▌1. Stephen R. Mallory (D)
▌2. Robert Bullock (D)

==== Georgia ====
▌1. Rufus E. Lester (D)
▌2. Henry G. Turner (D)
▌3. Charles F. Crisp (D)
▌4. Charles L. Moses (D)
▌5. Leonidas F. Livingston (D)
▌6. James H. Blount (D)
▌7. Robert W. Everett (D)
▌8. Thomas G. Lawson (D)
▌9. Thomas E. Winn (D)
▌10. Thomas E. Watson (P)

==== Idaho ====
▌At-large. Willis Sweet (R)

==== Illinois ====
▌1. Abner Taylor (R)
▌2. Lawrence E. McGann (D)
▌3. Allan C. Durborow Jr. (D)
▌4. Walter C. Newberry (D)
▌5. Albert J. Hopkins (R)
▌6. Robert R. Hitt (R)
▌7. Thomas J. Henderson (R)
▌8. Lewis Steward (D)
▌9. Herman W. Snow (D)
▌10. Philip S. Post (R)
▌11. Benjamin T. Cable (D)
▌12. Scott Wike (D)
▌13. William M. Springer (D)
▌14. Owen Scott (D)
▌15. Samuel T. Busey (D)
▌16. George W. Fithian (D)
▌17. Edward Lane (D)
▌18. William S. Forman (D)
▌19. James R. Williams (D)
▌20. George Washington Smith (R)

==== Indiana ====
▌1. William F. Parrett (D)
▌2. John L. Bretz (D)
▌3. Jason B. Brown (D)
▌4. William S. Holman (D)
▌5. George W. Cooper (D)
▌6. Henry U. Johnson (R)
▌7. William D. Bynum (D)
▌8. Elijah V. Brookshire (D)
▌9. Daniel W. Waugh (R)
▌10. David H. Patton (D)
▌11. Augustus N. Martin (D)
▌12. Charles A. O. McClellan (D)
▌13. Benjamin F. Shively (D)

==== Iowa ====
▌1. John J. Seerley (D)
▌2. Walter I. Hayes (D)
▌3. David B. Henderson (R)
▌4. Walter H. Butler (D)
▌5. John T. Hamilton (D)
▌6. Frederick E. White (D)
▌7. John A. T. Hull (R)
▌8. James P. Flick (R)
▌9. Thomas Bowman (D)
▌10. Jonathan P. Dolliver (R)
▌11. George D. Perkins (R)

==== Kansas ====
▌1. Case Broderick (R)
▌2. Edward H. Funston (R)
▌3. Benjamin H. Clover (P)
▌4. John G. Otis (P)
▌5. John Davis (P)
▌6. William Baker (P)
▌7. Jeremiah Simpson (P)

==== Kentucky ====
▌1. William J. Stone (D)
▌2. William T. Ellis (D)
▌3. Isaac H. Goodnight (D)
▌4. Alexander B. Montgomery (D)
▌5. Asher G. Caruth (D)
▌6. William W. Dickerson (D)
▌7. William C. P. Breckinridge (D)
▌8. James B. McCreary (D)
▌9. Thomas H. Paynter (D)
▌10. John W. Kendall (D), until March 7, 1892

▌Joseph M. Kendall (D), from April 21, 1892

▌11. John H. Wilson (R)

==== Louisiana ====
▌1. Adolph Meyer (D)
▌2. Matthew D. Lagan (D)
▌3. Andrew Price (D)
▌4. Newton C. Blanchard (D)
▌5. Charles J. Boatner (D)
▌6. Samuel M. Robertson (D)

==== Maine ====
▌1. Thomas B. Reed (R)
▌2. Nelson Dingley Jr. (R)
▌3. Seth L. Milliken (R)
▌4. Charles A. Boutelle (R)

==== Maryland ====
▌1. Henry Page (D), until September 3, 1892

▌John B. Brown (D), from November 8, 1892

▌2. Herman Stump (D)
▌3. Henry W. Rusk (D)
▌4. Isidor Rayner (D)
▌5. Barnes Compton (D)
▌6. William M. McKaig (D)

==== Massachusetts ====
▌1. Charles S. Randall (R)
▌2. Elijah A. Morse (R)
▌3. John F. Andrew (D)
▌4. Joseph H. O'Neil (D)
▌5. Sherman Hoar (D)
▌6. Henry Cabot Lodge (R), until March 3, 1893
▌7. William Cogswell (R)
▌8. Moses T. Stevens (D)
▌9. George F. Williams (D)
▌10. Joseph H. Walker (R)
▌11. Frederick S. Coolidge (D)
▌12. John C. Crosby (D)

==== Michigan ====
▌1. J. Logan Chipman (D)
▌2. James S. Gorman (D)
▌3. James O'Donnell (R)
▌4. Julius C. Burrows (R)
▌5. Melbourne H. Ford (D), until April 20, 1891

▌Charles E. Belknap (R), from November 3, 1891

▌6. Byron G. Stout (D)
▌7. Justin R. Whiting (D)
▌8. Henry M. Youmans (D)
▌9. Harrison H. Wheeler (D)
▌10. Thomas A. E. Weadock (D)
▌11. Samuel M. Stephenson (R)

==== Minnesota ====
▌1. William H. Harries (D)
▌2. John Lind (R)
▌3. Osee M. Hall (D)
▌4. James N. Castle (D)
▌5. Kittel Halvorson (P)

==== Mississippi ====
▌1. John M. Allen (D)
▌2. John C. Kyle (D)
▌3. Thomas C. Catchings (D)
▌4. Clarke Lewis (D)
▌5. Joseph H. Beeman (D)
▌6. Thomas R. Stockdale (D)
▌7. Charles E. Hooker (D)

==== Missouri ====
▌1. William H. Hatch (D)
▌2. Charles H. Mansur (D)
▌3. Alexander M. Dockery (D)
▌4. Robert P. C. Wilson (D)
▌5. John C. Tarsney (D)
▌6. John T. Heard (D)
▌7. Richard H. Norton (D)
▌8. John J. O'Neill (D)
▌9. Seth W. Cobb (D)
▌10. Samuel Byrns (D)
▌11. Richard P. Bland (D)
▌12. David A. De Armond (D)
▌13. Robert W. Fyan (D)
▌14. Marshall Arnold (D)

==== Montana ====
▌At-large. William W. Dixon (D)

==== Nebraska ====
▌1. William J. Bryan (D)
▌2. William A. McKeighan (P)
▌3. Omer M. Kem (P)

==== Nevada ====
▌At-large. Horace F. Bartine (R)

==== New Hampshire ====
▌1. Luther F. McKinney (D)
▌2. Warren F. Daniell (D)

==== New Jersey ====
▌1. Christopher A. Bergen (R)
▌2. James Buchanan (R)
▌3. Jacob A. Geissenhainer (D)
▌4. Samuel Fowler (D)
▌5. Cornelius A. Cadmus (D)
▌6. Thomas D. English (D)
▌7. Edward F. McDonald (D), until November 5, 1892, vacant thereafter

==== New York ====
▌1. James W. Covert (D)
▌2. David A. Boody (D), until October 13, 1891

▌Alfred C. Chapin (D), from November 3, 1891, until November 16, 1892, vacant thereafter

▌3. William J. Coombs (D)
▌4. John M. Clancy (D)
▌5. Thomas F. Magner (D)
▌6. John R. Fellows (D)
▌7. Edward J. Dunphy (D)
▌8. Timothy J. Campbell (D)
▌9. Amos J. Cummings (D)
▌10. Francis B. Spinola (D), until April 14, 1891

▌W. Bourke Cockran (D), from November 3, 1891

▌11. J. De Witt Warner (D)
▌12. Roswell P. Flower (D), until September 16, 1891

▌Joseph J. Little (D), from November 3, 1891

▌13. Ashbel P. Fitch (D)
▌14. William G. Stahlnecker (D)
▌15. Henry Bacon (D)
▌16. John H. Ketcham (R)
▌17. Isaac N. Cox (D)
▌18. John A. Quackenbush (R)
▌19. Charles Tracey (D)
▌20. John Sanford (R)
▌21. John M. Wever (R)
▌22. Leslie W. Russell (R), until September 11, 1891

▌Newton M. Curtis (R), from November 3, 1891

▌23. Henry W. Bentley (D)
▌24. George Van Horn (D)
▌25. James J. Belden (R)
▌26. George W. Ray (R)
▌27. Sereno E. Payne (R)
▌28. Hosea H. Rockwell (D)
▌29. John Raines (R)
▌30. Halbert S. Greenleaf (D)
▌31. James W. Wadsworth (R)
▌32. Daniel N. Lockwood (D)
▌33. Thomas L. Bunting (D)
▌34. Warren B. Hooker (R)

==== North Carolina ====
▌1. William A. B. Branch (D)
▌2. Henry P. Cheatham (R)
▌3. Benjamin F. Grady (D)
▌4. Benjamin H. Bunn (D)
▌5. Archibald H. A. Williams (D)
▌6. Sydenham B. Alexander (D)
▌7. John S. Henderson (D)
▌8. William H. H. Cowles (D)
▌9. William T. Crawford (D)

==== North Dakota ====
▌At-large. Martin N. Johnson (R)

==== Ohio ====
▌1. Bellamy Storer (R)
▌2. John A. Caldwell (R)
▌3. George W. Houk (D)
▌4. Martin K. Gantz (D)
▌5. Fernando C. Layton (D)
▌6. Dennis D. Donovan (D)
▌7. William E. Haynes (D)
▌8. Darius D. Hare (D)
▌9. Joseph H. Outhwaite (D)
▌10. Robert E. Doan (R)
▌11. John M. Pattison (D)
▌12. William H. Enochs (R)
▌13. J. Irvine Dungan (D)
▌14. James W. Owens (D)
▌15. Michael D. Harter (D)
▌16. John G. Warwick (D), until August 14, 1892

▌Lewis P. Ohliger (D), from December 5, 1892

▌17. Albert J. Pearson (D)
▌18. Joseph D. Taylor (R)
▌19. Ezra B. Taylor (R)
▌20. Vincent A. Taylor (R)
▌21. Tom L. Johnson (D)

==== Oregon ====
▌At-large. Binger Hermann (R)

==== Pennsylvania ====
▌1. Henry H. Bingham (R)
▌2. Charles O'Neill (R)
▌3. William McAleer (D)
▌4. John E. Reyburn (R)
▌5. Alfred C. Harmer (R)
▌6. John B. Robinson (R)
▌7. Edwin Hallowell (D)
▌8. William Mutchler (D)
▌9. David B. Brunner (D)
▌10. Marriott Brosius (R)
▌11. Lemuel Amerman (D)
▌12. George W. Shonk (R)
▌13. James B. Reilly (D)
▌14. John W. Rife (R)
▌15. Myron B. Wright (R)
▌16. Albert C. Hopkins (R)
▌17. Simon P. Wolverton (D)
▌18. Louis E. Atkinson (R)
▌19. Frank E. Beltzhoover (D)
▌20. Edward Scull (R)
▌21. George F. Huff (R)
▌22. John Dalzell (R)
▌23. William A. Stone (R)
▌24. Andrew Stewart (R), until February 26, 1892

▌Alexander K. Craig (D), from February 26, 1892, until July 29, 1892
▌William A. Sipe (D), from December 5, 1892

▌25. Eugene P. Gillespie (D)
▌26. Matthew Griswold (R)
▌27. Charles W. Stone (R)
▌28. George F. Kribbs (D)

==== Rhode Island ====
▌1. Oscar Lapham (D)
▌2. Charles H. Page (D)

==== South Carolina ====
▌1. William H. Brawley (D)
▌2. George D. Tillman (D)
▌3. George Johnstone (D)
▌4. George W. Shell (D)
▌5. John J. Hemphill (D)
▌6. Eli T. Stackhouse (D), until June 14, 1892

▌John L. McLaurin (D), from December 5, 1892

▌7. William Elliott (D)

==== South Dakota ====
Both representatives were elected statewide on a general ticket

▌At-large. John R. Gamble (R), until August 14, 1891

▌John L. Jolley (R), from December 7, 1891

▌At-large. John A. Pickler (R)

==== Tennessee ====
▌1. Alfred A. Taylor (R)
▌2. Leonidas C. Houk (R), until May 25, 1891

▌John C. Houk (R), from December 7, 1891

▌3. Henry C. Snodgrass (D)
▌4. Benton McMillin (D)
▌5. James D. Richardson (D)
▌6. Joseph E. Washington (D)
▌7. Nicholas N. Cox (D)
▌8. Benjamin A. Enloe (D)
▌9. Rice A. Pierce (D)
▌10. Josiah Patterson (D)

==== Texas ====
▌1. Charles Stewart (D)
▌2. John B. Long (D)
▌3. Constantine B. Kilgore (D)
▌4. David B. Culberson (D)
▌5. Joseph W. Bailey (D)
▌6. Joseph Abbott (D)
▌7. William H. Crain (D)
▌8. Littleton W. Moore (D)
▌9. Roger Q. Mills (D), until March 29, 1892

▌Edwin Le Roy Antony (D), from June 14, 1892

▌10. Joseph D. Sayers (D)
▌11. Samuel W. T. Lanham (D)

==== Vermont ====
▌1. H. Henry Powers (R)
▌2. William W. Grout (R)

==== Virginia ====
▌1. William A. Jones (D)
▌2. John W. Lawson (D)
▌3. George D. Wise (D)
▌4. James F. Epes (D)
▌5. Posey G. Lester (D)
▌6. Paul C. Edmunds (D)
▌7. Charles T. O'Ferrall (D)
▌8. William H. F. Lee (D), until October 15, 1891

▌Elisha E. Meredith (D), from December 9, 1891

▌9. John A. Buchanan (D)
▌10. Henry St. George Tucker III (D)

==== Washington ====
▌At-large. John L. Wilson (R)

==== West Virginia ====
▌1. John O. Pendleton (D)
▌2. William L. Wilson (D)
▌3. John D. Alderson (D)
▌4. James Capehart (D)

==== Wisconsin ====
▌1. Clinton Babbitt (D)
▌2. Charles Barwig (D)
▌3. Allen R. Bushnell (D)
▌4. John L. Mitchell (D), until March 3, 1893
▌5. George H. Brickner (D)
▌6. Lucas M. Miller (D)
▌7. Frank P. Coburn (D)
▌8. Nils P. Haugen (R)
▌9. Thomas Lynch (D)

==== Wyoming ====
▌At-large. Clarence D. Clark (R)

==== Non-voting members ====
▌Arizona Territory. Marcus A. Smith (D)
▌New Mexico Territory. Antonio Joseph (D)
▌Oklahoma Territory. David A. Harvey (R)
▌Utah Territory. John T. Caine (D)

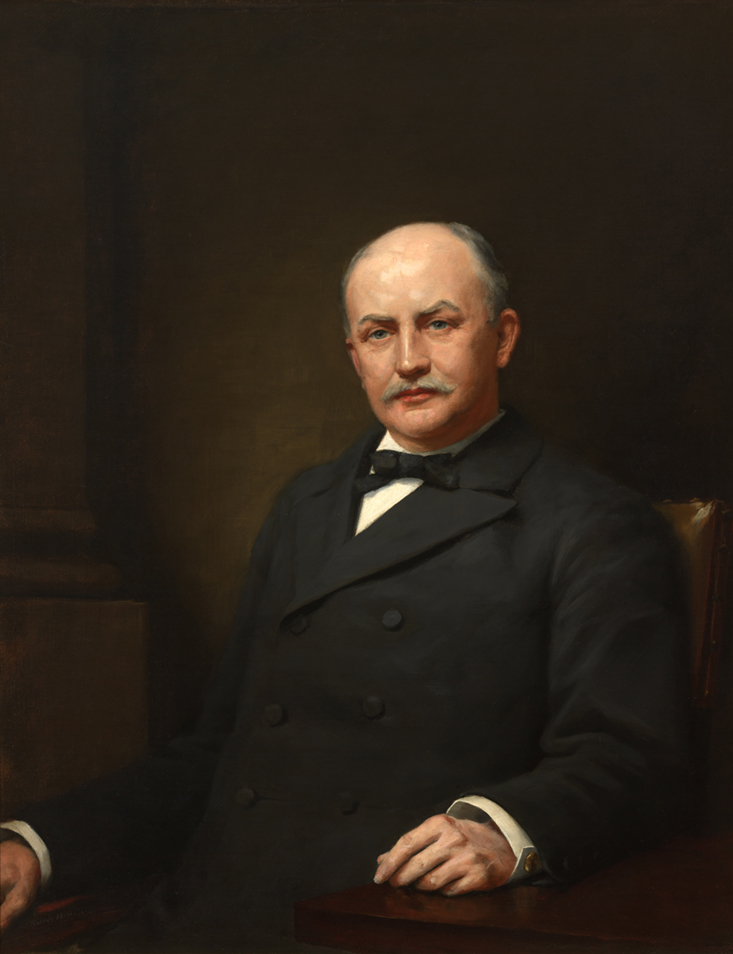
Speaker of the House Charles F. Crisp

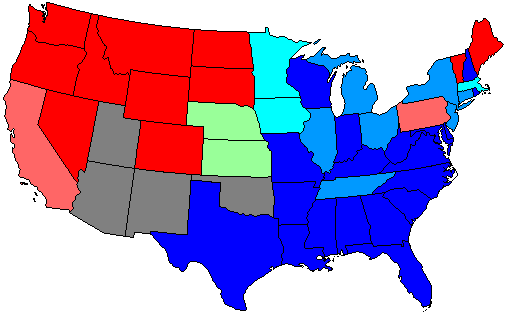
House seats by party holding plurality in state: 80+% to 100% Democratic / 80+% to 100% Republican; 60+% to 80% Democratic / 60+% to 80% Republican; Up to 60% Democratic / Up to 60% Republican

== Changes in membership ==
The count below reflects changes from the beginning of this Congress.

=== Senate ===
- Replacements: 7
  - Democratic: no net change
  - Republican: no net change
  - Liberal Republican: 1 seat net loss
- Deaths: 4
- Resignations: 5
- Interim appointments: 1
- Total seats with changes: 10

Senate changes
State (class)	Vacated by	Reason for change	Successor	Date of successor's formal installation (Note: When seated or oath administered, not necessarily when service began.)
California (1)	Vacant	George Hearst died during previous congress. Successor was elected.	Charles N. Felton (R)	March 19, 1891
Maryland (3)	Vacant	Ephraim K. Wilson died during previous congress. Successor was appointed and subsequently elected (January 21, 1892).	Charles H. Gibson (D)	November 19, 1891
New York (3)	Vacant	Chose to finish his term as Governor of New York before being installed as U.S. Senator.	David B. Hill (D)	January 17, 1892
Florida (3)	Vacant	Legislature had failed to elect. Incumbent was elected late.	Wilkinson Call (D)	May 26, 1891
Texas (1)	John H. Reagan (D)	Resigned June 10, 1891. Successor was appointed.	Horace Chilton (D)	June 10, 1891
Vermont (1)	George F. Edmunds (R)	Resigned November 1, 1891. Successor was appointed and subsequently elected (October 19, 1892).	Redfield Proctor (R)	November 2, 1891
Kansas (2)	Preston B. Plumb (R)	Died December 20, 1891. Successor was appointed.	Bishop W. Perkins (R)	January 1, 1892
Texas (1)	Horace Chilton (D)	Successor was elected March 22, 1892.	Roger Q. Mills (D)	March 29, 1892
Virginia (2)	John S. Barbour Jr. (D)	Died May 14, 1892. Successor was appointed and subsequently elected (December 20, 1893).	Eppa Hunton (D)	May 28, 1892
Louisiana (2)	Randall L. Gibson (D)	Died December 15, 1892. Successor was appointed and subsequently elected (May 23, 1894).	Donelson Caffery (D)	December 31, 1892
West Virginia (2)	John E. Kenna (D)	Died January 11, 1893. Successor was elected.	Johnson N. Camden (D)	January 25, 1893
Kentucky (2)	John G. Carlisle (D)	Resigned February 4, 1893, after being appointed United States Secretary of the Treasury. Successor was elected.	William Lindsay (D)	February 15, 1893

=== House of Representatives ===
- replacements: 15
  - Democratic: 1-seat net loss
  - Republican: 1-seat net gain
- Deaths: 10
- Resignations: 8
- Contested election: 1
- Total seats with changes: 18

District	Vacated by	Reason for change	Successor	Date successor seated
New York 10th	Francis B. Spinola (D)	Died April 14, 1891	W. Bourke Cockran (D)	November 3, 1891
Michigan 5th	Melbourne H. Ford (D)	Died April 20, 1891	Charles E. Belknap (R)	November 3, 1891
Tennessee 2nd	Leonidas C. Houk (R)	Died May 25, 1891	John C. Houk (R)	December 7, 1891
South Dakota At-large	John R. Gamble (R)	Died August 14, 1891	John L. Jolley (R)	December 7, 1891
New York 22nd	Leslie W. Russell (R)	Resigned September 11, 1891, after being elected judge for the New York Supreme Court	Newton M. Curtis (R)	November 3, 1891
New York 12th	Roswell P. Flower (D)	Resigned September 16, 1891, to run for Governor of New York	Joseph J. Little (D)	November 3, 1891
New York 2nd	David A. Boody (D)	Resigned October 13, 1891, to run for Mayor of Brooklyn, New York	Alfred C. Chapin (D)	November 3, 1891
Virginia 8th	William H. F. Lee (D)	Died October 15, 1891	Elisha E. Meredith (D)	December 9, 1891
Pennsylvania 24th	Andrew Stewart (R)	Election was successfully challenged February 26, 1892	Alexander K. Craig (D)	February 26, 1892
Kentucky 10th	John W. Kendall (D)	Died March 7, 1892	Joseph M. Kendall (D)	April 21, 1892
California 3rd	Joseph McKenna (R)	Resigned March 28, 1892	Samuel G. Hilborn (R)	December 5, 1892
Texas 9th	Roger Q. Mills (D)	Resigned March 28, 1892, after being elected to the U.S. Senate	Edwin Le Roy Antony (D)	June 14, 1892
South Carolina 6th	Eli T. Stackhouse (D)	Died June 14, 1892	John L. McLaurin (D)	December 5, 1892
Pennsylvania 24th	Alexander K. Craig (D)	Died July 29, 1892	William A. Sipe (D)	December 5, 1892
Ohio 16th	John G. Warwick (D)	Died August 14, 1892	Lewis P. Ohliger (D)	December 5, 1892
Maryland 1st	Henry Page (D)	Resigned September 3, 1892, to become judge for the Maryland Court of Appeals	John B. Brown (D)	November 8, 1892
New Jersey 7th	Edward F. McDonald (D)	Died November 5, 1892	Vacant until next Congress	
New York 2nd	Alfred C. Chapin (D)	Resigned November 16, 1892	Vacant until next Congress	
Massachusetts 6th	Henry Cabot Lodge (R)	Resigned March 3, 1893, after being elected to the U.S. Senate	Vacant until next Congress	
Wisconsin 4th	John L. Mitchell (D)	Resigned March 3, 1893, after being elected to the U.S. Senate	Vacant until next Congress	

== Committees ==
Lists of committees and their party leaders for members of the House and Senate committees can be found through the Official Congressional Directory at the bottom of this article. The directory after the pages of terms of service lists committees of the Senate, House (Standing with Subcommittees, Select and Special) and Joint and, after that, House/Senate committee assignments. On the committees section of the House and Senate in the Official Congressional Directory, the committee's members on the first row on the left side shows the chairman of the committee and on the right side shows the ranking member of the committee.

=== Senate ===
- Additional Accommodations for the Library of Congress (Select) (Chairman: Daniel W. Voorhees; Ranking Member: Nathan F. Dixon)
- Agriculture and Forestry (Chairman: Algernon S. Paddock; Ranking Member: James Z. George)
- Appropriations (Chairman: William B. Allison; Ranking Member: Francis M. Cockrell)
- Armed Strikebreakers (Select)
- Audit and Control the Contingent Expenses of the Senate (Chairman: John P. Jones; Ranking Member: Zebulon B. Vance)
- Canadian Relations (Chairman: John B. Allen; Ranking Member: James L. Pugh)
- Census (Chairman: Eugene Hale; Ranking Member: James H. Berry)
- Cherokee Nation's Complaints of Invasion in their Territory (Select) (Chairman: Bishop W. Perkins; Ranking Member: N/A)
- Civil Service and Retrenchment (Chairman: Edward O. Wolcott; Ranking Member: Edward C. Walthall)
- Claims (Chairman: John H. Mitchell; Ranking Member: Samuel Pasco)
- Coast Defenses (Chairman: Watson C. Squire; Ranking Member: James H. Berry)
- Commerce (Chairman: William P. Frye; Ranking Member: Isham G. Harris)
- Corporations Organized in the District of Columbia (Select) (Chairman: Arthur P. Gorman; Ranking Member: N/A)
- Distributing Public Revenue Among the States (Select)
- District of Columbia (Chairman: James McMillan; Ranking Member: N/A)
- Education and Labor (Chairman: Joseph M. Carey; Ranking Member: James Z. George)
- Engrossed Bills (Chairman: Francis M. Cockrell; Ranking Member: Francis E. Warren)
- Enrolled Bills (Chairman: Wilbur F. Sanders; Ranking Member: Alfred H. Colquitt)
- Epidemic Diseases (Chairman: Isham G. Harris; Ranking Member: Francis B. Stockbridge)
- Establish a University in the United States (Select) (Chairman: Redfield Proctor; Ranking Member: N/A)
- Examine the Several Branches in the Civil Service (Chairman: Thomas C. Power; Ranking Member: George Gray)
- Failed National Banks (Select) (Chairman: William E. Chandler; Ranking Member: N/A)
- Finance (Chairman: Justin S. Morrill; Ranking Member: Daniel W. Voorhees)
- Fisheries (Chairman: Francis B. Stockbridge; Ranking Member: Rufus Blodgett)
- Five Civilized Tribes of Indians (Select) (Chairman: Matthew C. Butler; Ranking Member: J. Donald Cameron)
- Foreign Relations (Chairman: John Sherman; Ranking Member: John Tyler Morgan)
- Forest Reservations in California (Select) (Chairman: Charles N. Felton)
- Geological Survey (Select) (Chairman: Edward O. Wolcott; Ranking Member: N/A)
- Immigration (Chairman: William E. Chandler; Ranking Member: Daniel W. Voorhees)
- Indian Affairs (Chairman: Henry L. Dawes; Ranking Member: George L. Shoup)
- Interstate Commerce (Chairman: Shelby M. Cullom; Ranking Member: Isham G. Harris)
- Irrigation and Reclamation of Arid Lands (Select) (Chairman: Francis E. Warren; Ranking Member: James K. Jones)
- Judiciary (Chairman: George F. Hoar; Ranking Member: James L. Pugh)
- Library (Chairman: Matthew S. Quay; Ranking Member: Daniel W. Voorhees)
- Manufactures (Chairman: Anthony Higgins; Ranking Member: Rufus Blodgett)
- Military Affairs (Chairman: Joseph R. Hawley; Ranking Member: Francis M. Cockrell)
- Mines and Mining (Chairman: J. Donald Cameron; Ranking Member: William B. Bate)
- Mississippi River and its Tributaries (Select) (Chairman: William D. Washburn; Ranking Member: Edward C. Walthall)
- Naval Affairs (Chairman: J. Donald Cameron; Ranking Member: John R. McPherson)
- Nicaraguan Claims (Select) (Chairman: John Tyler Morgan; Ranking Member: William M. Stewart)
- Organization, Conduct and Expenditures of the Executive Departments (Chairman: Frank Hiscock; Ranking Member: Francis M. Cockrell)
- Patents (Chairman: Nathan F. Dixon; Ranking Member: George Gray)
- Pensions (Chairman: Cushman K. Davis; Ranking Member: David Turpie)
- Post Office and Post Roads (Chairman: Philetus Sawyer; Ranking Member: Alfred H. Colquitt)
- Potomac River Front (Select) (Chairman: John R. McPherson; Ranking Member: Philetus Sawyer)
- Printing (Chairman: Charles F. Manderson; Ranking Member: Arthur P. Gorman)
- Private Land Claims (Chairman: Matt W. Ransom; Ranking Member: Henry M. Teller)
- Privileges and Elections (Chairman: Henry M. Teller; Ranking Member: Zebulon B. Vance)
- Public Buildings and Grounds (Chairman: Leland Stanford; Ranking Member: George G. Vest)
- Public Lands (Chairman: Joseph N. Dolph; Ranking Member: John T. Morgan)
- Quadrocentennial (Select) (Chairman: Richard F. Pettigrew; Ranking Member: Alfred H. Colquitt)
- Railroads (Chairman: Lyman R. Casey; Ranking Member: Joseph Clay Stiles Blackburn)
- Revision of the Laws (Chairman: James F. Wilson; Ranking Member: John W. Daniel)
- Revolutionary Claims (Chairman: Richard Coke; Ranking Member: J. Donald Cameron)
- Rules (Chairman: Nelson W. Aldrich; Ranking Member: Isham G. Harris)
- Tariff Regulation (Select)
- Territories (Chairman: Orville H. Platt; Ranking Member: James K. Jones)
- Transportation and Sale of Meat Products (Select) (Chairman: George G. Vest; Ranking Member: Lyman R. Casey)
- Transportation Routes to the Seaboard (Chairman: John B. Allen; Ranking Member: Randall L. Gibson then James Z. George)
- Whole
- Woman Suffrage (Select) (Chairman: Zebulon B. Vance; Ranking Member: John B. Allen)

=== House of Representatives ===
- Accounts (Chairman: Harry Welles Rusk; Ranking Member: Albert J. Pearson)
- Agriculture (Chairman: William H. Hatch; Ranking Member: Charles L. Moses)
- Alcoholic Liquor Traffic (Select)
- Appropriations (Chairman: William S. Holman; Ranking Member: David B. Henderson)
- Banking and Currency (Chairman: Henry Bacon; Ranking Member: Seth W. Cobb)
- Claims (Chairman: Benjamin H. Bunn; Ranking Member: Isaac N. Cox)
- Coinage, Weights and Measures (Chairman: Richard P. Bland; Ranking Member: George F. Williams)
- Disposition of Executive Papers (Chairman: William E. Haynes; Ranking Member: Thomas Bowman)
- District of Columbia (Chairman: John J. Hemphill; Ranking Member: Cornelius A. Cadmus)
- Education (Chairman: Benjamin A. Enloe; Ranking Member: Edwin Hallowell)
- Elections (Chairman: Charles T. O'Ferrall; Ranking Member: George Johnstone)
- Enrolled Bills (Chairman: Owen Scott; Ranking Member: John A. Pickler)
- Expenditures in the Agriculture Department (Chairman: Paul C. Edmunds; Ranking Member: Kittel Halvorson)
- Expenditures in the Interior Department (Chairman: James W. Owens; Ranking Member: William W. Grout)
- Expenditures in the Justice Department (Chairman: John M. Allen; Ranking Member: Ezra B. Taylor)
- Expenditures in the Navy Department (Chairman: Charles A.O. McClellan; Ranking Member: George W. Ray)
- Expenditures in the Post Office Department (Chairman: William C. Oates; Ranking Member: James S. Gorman)
- Expenditures in the State Department (Chairman: Rufus E. Lester; Ranking Member: John Sanford)
- Expenditures in the Treasury Department (Chairman: George H. Brickner; Ranking Member: William A. Stone)
- Expenditures in the War Department (Chairman: Alexander B. Montgomery; Ranking Member: Robert R. Hitt)
- Expenditures on Public Buildings (Chairman: Henry M. Youmans; Ranking Member: John H. Ketcham)
- Foreign Affairs (Chairman: James H. Blount; Ranking Member: Isidor Rayner)
- Indian Affairs (Chairman: Samuel W. Peel; Ranking Member: Benjamin H. Clover)
- Interstate and Foreign Commerce (Chairman: George D. Wise; Ranking Member: Asher G. Caruth)
- Invalid Pensions (Chairman: Augustus N. Martin; Ranking Member: Edward F. McDonald then Walter H. Butler)
- Judiciary (Chairman: David B. Culberson; Ranking Member: Fernando C. Layton)
- Labor (Chairman: John C. Tarsney; Ranking Member: John W. Causey)
- Levees and Improvements of the Mississippi River (Chairman: Samuel M. Robertson; Ranking Member: William McAleer)
- Manufactures (Chairman: Charles H. Page; Ranking Member: Archibald H.A. Williams)
- Merchant Marine and Fisheries (Chairman: Samuel Fowler; Ranking Member: Herman Stump)
- Mileage (Chairman: James N. Castle; Ranking Member: John A. Caldwell)
- Military Affairs (Chairman: Joseph H. Outhwaite; Ranking Member: Edward F. McDonald then John C. Crosby)
- Militia (Chairman: Edward Lane; Ranking Member: Alexander K. Craig)
- Mines and Mining (Chairman: William H. H. Cowles; Ranking Member: Thomas Bowman)
- Naval Affairs (Chairman: Hilary A. Herbert; Ranking Member: William McAleer)
- Pacific Railroads (Chairman: James B. Reilly; Ranking Member: Frederick S. Coolidge)
- Patents (Chairman: George D. Tillman; Ranking Member: John T. Hamilton)
- Pensions (Chairman: Robert P.C. Wilson; Ranking Member: Charles L. Moses)
- Printing (Chairman: James D. Richardson; Ranking Member: Case Broderick)
- Private Land Claims (Chairman: Ashbel P. Fitch; Ranking Member: William T. Crawford)
- Post Office and Post Roads (Chairman: John S. Henderson; Ranking Member: John C. Crosby)
- Public Buildings and Grounds (Chairman: John H. Bankhead; Ranking Member: John De Witt Warner)
- Public Lands (Chairman: Thomas C. McRae; Ranking Member: Darius D. Hare)
- Railways and Canals (Chairman: Thomas C. Catchings; Ranking Member: Kittel Halvorson)
- Revision of Laws (Chairman: William T. Ellis; Ranking Member: Lemuel Amerman)
- Rivers and Harbors (Chairman: Newton C. Blanchard; Ranking Member: Charles H. Page)
- Rules (Chairman: Charles F. Crisp; Ranking Member: Thomas B. Reed)
- Standards of Official Conduct
- Territories (Chairman: Joseph E. Washington; Ranking Member: Dennis D. Donovan)
- War Claims (Chairman: Frank E. Beltzhoover; Ranking Member: George W. Shell)
- Ways and Means (Chairman: William M. Springer; Ranking Member: Thomas B. Reed)
- Whole

=== Joint committees ===
- Conditions of Indian Tribes (Special)
- Disposition of (Useless) Executive Papers
- The Library
- Printing

== Caucuses ==
- Democratic (House)
- Democratic (Senate)

== Employees ==
=== Legislative branch agency directors ===
- Architect of the Capitol: Edward Clark
- Librarian of Congress: Ainsworth Rand Spofford
- Public Printer of the United States: Francis W. Palmer

=== Senate ===
- Chaplain: John G. Butler (Lutheran)
- Secretary: Anson G. McCook
- Librarian: Alonzo M. Church
- Sergeant at Arms: Edward K. Valentine

=== House of Representatives ===
- Clerk: Edward McPherson, until December 8, 1891
  - James Kerr, from December 8, 1891
- Clerk at the Speaker's Table: Charles R. Crisp
- Chaplain: William H. Milburn (Methodist)
- Doorkeeper: Charles H. Turner, elected December 8, 1891
- Reading Clerks: John A. Reeve (D) and James C. Broadwell (R)
- Postmaster: James W. Hathaway
- Sergeant at Arms: Adoniram J. Holmes, until December 8, 1891
  - Samuel S. Yoder, from December 8, 1891

== See also ==
- 1890 United States elections (elections leading to this Congress)
  - 1890–91 United States Senate elections
  - 1890 United States House of Representatives elections
  - 1891 United States House of Representatives elections
- 1892 United States elections (elections during this Congress, leading to the next Congress)
  - 1892 United States presidential election
  - 1892–93 United States Senate elections
  - 1892 United States House of Representatives elections
