= Edwin R. Ridgely =

American politician

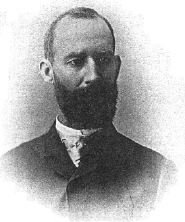

Member of the U.S. House of Representatives from Kansas's 3rd district
- In office March 4, 1897 – March 3, 1901
- Preceded by: Snyder S. Kirkpatrick
- Succeeded by: Alfred Metcalf Jackson

Personal details
- Born: Edwin Reed Ridgely; May 9, 1844 Lancaster, Illinois, US
- Died: April 23, 1927 (aged 82) Girard, Kansas, US
- Resting place: Girard Cemetery
- Party: Populist

Edwin Reed Ridgely (May 9, 1844 – April 23, 1927) was an American businessman, Civil War veteran and politician who served two terms as a U.S. representative from Kansas from 1897 to 1901.

== Biography ==
Born near Lancaster, Illinois, Ridgely attended district school in the winter months.

=== Civil War ===
During the Civil War enlisted as a private in Company C, One Hundred and Fifteenth Regiment, Illinois Volunteer Infantry, in 1862. He was promoted to sergeant and served until the end of the war.

=== Career ===
He moved to Girard, Kansas, in 1869 and engaged in general merchandising and in agricultural pursuits. He left the Republican Party in 1876 because of its financial policy. He lived in Ogden, Utah, from 1889 to 1893 and then returned to Kansas.

=== Congress ===
Ridgely was elected as a Populist to the Fifty-fifth and Fifty-sixth Congresses (March 4, 1897 – March 3, 1901). He was not a candidate for renomination in 1900.

=== Later career and death ===
He resumed agricultural pursuits in Mulberry, Kansas. He died in Girard, Kansas on April 23, 1927. He was interred in Girard Cemetery.

U.S. House of Representatives
Preceded by Snyder S. Kirkpatrick	Member of the U.S. House of Representatives from Kansas's 3rd congressional district March 4, 1897 – March 3, 1901	Succeeded by Alfred M. Jackson
