= Andrew Stewart (American politician, born 1836) =

American politician

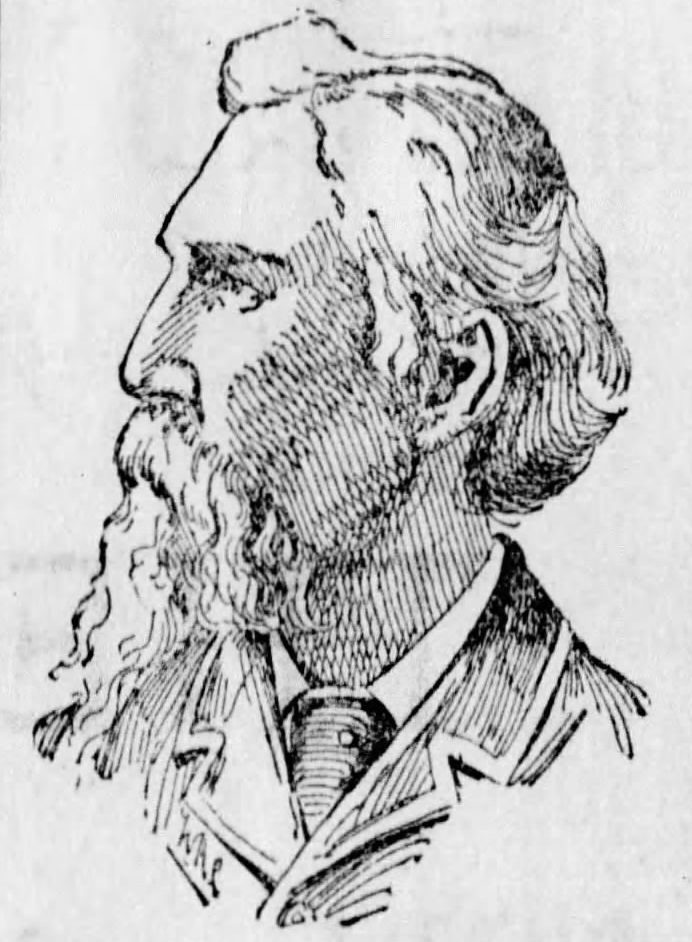
- The Pittsburgh Press, November 7, 1892

Personal details
- Born: April 6, 1836 Uniontown, Pennsylvania, U.S.
- Died: October 18, 1903 (aged 67) Stewarton, Springfield Township, Pennsylvania, U.S.
- Resting place: Union Cemetery, Uniontown, Pennsylvania, U.S.
- Spouse: Leila McCulloh
- Relations: Andrew Stewart (father)
- Children: 2
- Education: Madison College; Jefferson Medical College
- Profession: Physician

Military service
- Allegiance: United States
- Service: Union Army
- Years of service: 1861–1864
- Rank: Captain (army); Lieutenant Colonel (Brevet
- Unit: 85th Pennsylvania Infantry Regiment
- Wars: American Civil War

Andrew Stewart (April 6, 1836 – October 18, 1903) was a Republican member of the U.S. House of Representatives from Pennsylvania.

== Biography ==
Andrew Stewart (son of Congressman Andrew Stewart) was born in Uniontown, Pennsylvania. He attended Sewickley Academy in Sewickley, Pennsylvania, and Madison College in Uniontown. He studied medicine and attended Jefferson Medical College in Philadelphia, Pennsylvania. During the American Civil War he enlisted as a private in the Eighty-fifth Regiment, Pennsylvania Volunteer Infantry, and served throughout the war. He was an unsuccessful candidate for election in 1874. He presented credentials as a Republican Member-elect to the Fifty-second Congress and served from March 4, 1891, to February 26, 1892, when he was succeeded by Alexander K. Craig, who contested his election. He was again an unsuccessful candidate to the same congress to fill the vacancy caused by the death of Alexander Craig. He was later engaged in the manufacture of paper pulp and lumber. He died in Stewarton, Springfield Township, Pennsylvania. Interment in Union Cemetery in Uniontown.

U.S. House of Representatives
Preceded by Joseph W. Ray	Member of the U.S. House of Representatives from Pennsylvania's 24th congressional district 1891–1892	Succeeded by Alexander K. Craig
