= Philip P. Campbell =

American politician

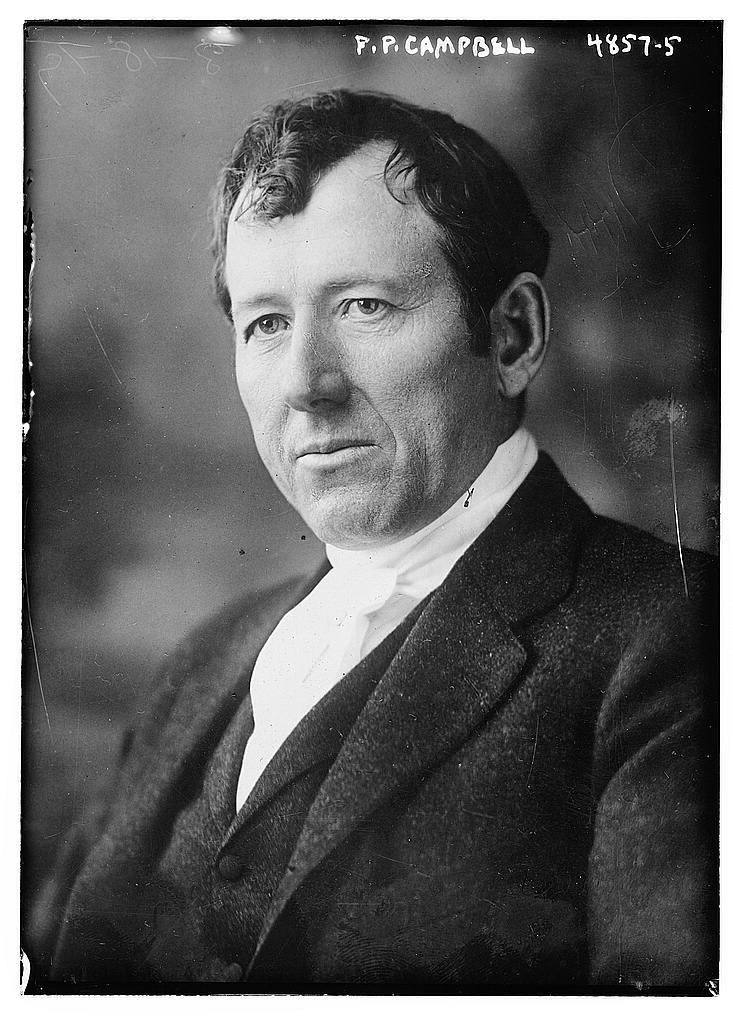

Chairman of the House Rules Committee
- In office March 4, 1919 – March 4, 1923
- Speaker: Frederick H. Gillett
- Preceded by: Edward W. Pou
- Succeeded by: Bertrand Snell

Member of the U.S. House of Representatives from Kansas's 3rd district
- In office March 4, 1903 – March 3, 1923
- Preceded by: Alfred Metcalf Jackson
- Succeeded by: William H. Sproul

Personal details
- Born: Philip Pitt Campbell; 25 April 1862 Cape Breton, Nova Scotia, Canada
- Died: 26 May 1941 (aged 79) Washington, D.C., U.S.
- Resting place: Abbey Mausoleum in Arlington County, Virginia, then reinterred in National Memorial Park in Falls Church, Virginia
- Party: Republican
- Education: Baker University

Philip Pitt Campbell (April 25, 1862 – May 26, 1941) was an American lawyer and politician who served ten terms as a U.S. representative from Kansas from 1903 to 1923,

== Biography ==
Born in Cape Breton, Nova Scotia, British North America, Campbell moved with his parents to Neosho County, Kansas, in 1867. He attended the common schools, and was graduated from Baker University, Baldwin City, Kansas, in 1888. He studied law. He was admitted to the bar in 1889 and commenced practice in Pittsburg, Kansas.

=== Tenure in Congress ===
Campbell was elected as a Republican to the Fifty-eighth and to the nine succeeding Congresses (March 4, 1903 – March 3, 1923).

He served as chairman of the Committee on Levees and Improvements of the Mississippi River (Sixty-first Congress), Committee on Rules (Sixty-sixth and Sixty-seventh Congresses).

He was an unsuccessful candidate for reelection in 1922 to the Sixty-eighth Congress.

=== Later career and death ===
He served as Parliamentarian of the Republican National Convention in 1924.

He resumed the practice of law in Washington, D.C., with residence in Arlington, Virginia.

He died in Washington, D.C., May 26, 1941. He was interred in Abbey Mausoleum in Arlington County, Virginia, then later reinterred at National Memorial Park in Falls Church, Virginia.

U.S. House of Representatives
Preceded by Alfred M. Jackson	Member of the U.S. House of Representatives from Kansas's 3rd congressional district March 4, 1903 – March 3, 1923	Succeeded by William H. Sproul
