= Alfred Metcalf Jackson =

American politician

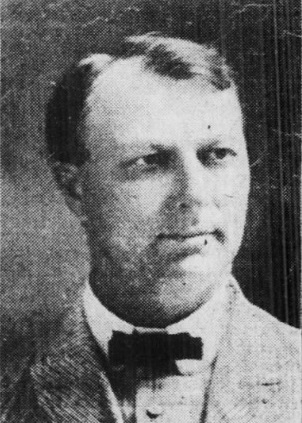

Member of the U.S. House of Representatives from Kansas's 3rd district
- In office March 4, 1901 – March 3, 1903
- Preceded by: Edwin R. Ridgely
- Succeeded by: Philip P. Campbell

Personal details
- Born: Alfred Metcalf Jackson; 14 July 1860 South Carrollton, Kentucky, U.S.
- Died: 11 June 1924 (aged 63) Winfield, Kansas, U.S.
- Resting place: Highland Mausoleum in Winfield
- Party: Democratic Party

Alfred Metcalf Jackson (July 14, 1860 – June 11, 1924) was an American lawyer, jurist and politician who served one term as a U.S. representative from Kansas from 1901 to 1903.

== Biography ==
Born in South Carrollton, Kentucky, Jackson attended the common schools and West Kentucky College, and then studied law. He was admitted to the bar and practiced.

He moved to Howard, Kansas, in 1881 and engaged in the practice of law. He served as prosecuting attorney of Elk County in 1890. He served as judge of the thirteenth judicial district of Kansas in 1892. He moved to Winfield, Kansas, in 1898.

=== Tenure in Congress ===
Jackson was elected as a Democrat to the Fifty-seventh Congress (March 4, 1901 – March 3, 1903).

While in Congress he introduced a bill proposing government ownership of telegraph lines which attracted considerable attention.

He was an unsuccessful candidate for reelection in 1902.

=== Later career and death ===
In 1904 Jackson was a delegate to the Democratic National Convention that nominated Alton B. Parker and Henry G. Davis. He resumed the practice of law in Winfield, Kansas, and died there on June 11, 1924.

== Notes ==
U.S. House of Representatives
Preceded by Edwin R. Ridgely	Member of the U.S. House of Representatives from Kansas's 3rd congressional district March 4, 1901 – March 3, 1903	Succeeded by Philip P. Campbell
