= William C. Arnold =

American politician

William Carlile Arnold
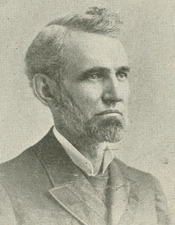

Member of the U.S. House of Representatives from Pennsylvania's 28th district
- In office March 4, 1895 – March 3, 1899
- Preceded by: George F. Kribbs
- Succeeded by: James K.P. Hall

Personal details
- Born: July 15, 1851 Luthersburg, Pennsylvania, U.S.
- Died: April 20, 1906 (aged 54) Muskegon, Michigan, U.S.
- Party: Republican

William Carlile Arnold (July 15, 1851 – March 20, 1906) was an American Republican member of the U.S. House of Representatives from Pennsylvania.

William C. Arnold was born in Luthersburg, Pennsylvania. He attended the public schools and Phillips Academy in Andover, Massachusetts. He studied law, was admitted to the bar in Clearfield County, Pennsylvania, and practiced in Curwensville and Du Bois, Clearfield County, Pennsylvania.

Arnold was elected as a Republican to the Fifty-fourth and Fifty-fifth Congresses. He was an unsuccessful candidate for reelection in 1898. He resumed the practice of law in Clearfield County and died in Muskegon, Michigan, while on a business trip. Interment in Oak Hill Cemetery in Curwensville.

== Sources ==
- United States Congress. "William C. Arnold (id: A000299)". Biographical Directory of the United States Congress.
- "Arnold, William Carlisle". The Biographical Dictionary of America. Vol. 1. 1906. p. 145.
- The Political Graveyard

U.S. House of Representatives
Preceded by George F. Kribbs	Member of the U.S. House of Representatives from Pennsylvania's 28th congressional district 1895–1899	Succeeded by James K.P. Hall
