= Alexander Kerr Craig =

American politician

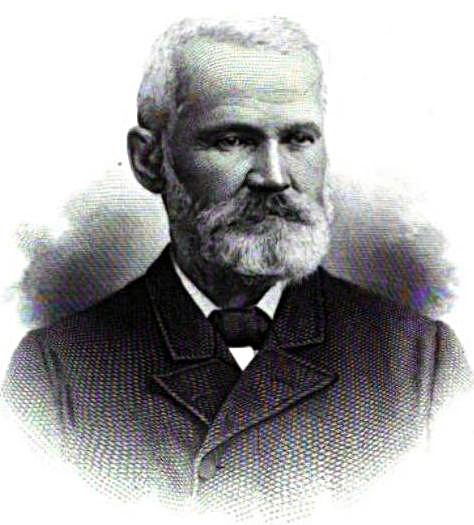

Member of the U.S. House of Representatives from Pennsylvania's 24th district
- In office February 26, 1892 – July 29, 1892
- Preceded by: Andrew Stewart
- Succeeded by: William A. Sipe

Personal details
- Born: February 21, 1828 Claysville, Pennsylvania
- Died: July 29, 1892 (aged 64)
- Party: Democratic

Alexander Kerr Craig (February 21, 1828 – July 29, 1892) was a Democratic member of the U.S. House of Representatives from Pennsylvania.

== Biography ==
Alexander K. Craig was born near Claysville, Pennsylvania. He attended the common schools and was educated by a private tutor. He became a teacher at the age of sixteen, and began the study of law, but devoted himself to agricultural pursuits. He taught school in winter months and subsequently became principal of the Claysville public schools. He enlisted in February 1865 in the Eighty-seventh Regiment, Pennsylvania Volunteer Infantry. After his service, he resumed agricultural pursuits near Claysville, and served as school director and justice of the peace.

Craig successfully contested as a Democrat the election of Andrew Stewart to the Fifty-second Congress and served until his death in Claysville in 1892. He was interred in Claysville Cemetery.

== See also ==
- List of members of the United States Congress who died in office (1790–1899)

U.S. House of Representatives
| Preceded by Andrew Stewart | Member of the U.S. House of Representatives from Pennsylvania's 24th congressional district 1892 | Succeeded by William A. Sipe |
