= Benjamin H. Clover =

American politician (1837–1899)

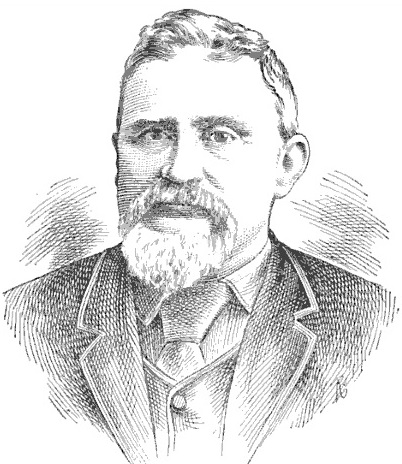

Member of the U.S. House of Representatives from Kansas's 3rd district
- In office March 4, 1891 – March 3, 1893
- Preceded by: Bishop W. Perkins
- Succeeded by: Thomas Jefferson Hudson

Personal details
- Born: December 22, 1837 Jefferson, Ohio
- Died: December 30, 1899 (aged 62) Douglass, Kansas
- Party: Populist

Benjamin Hutchinson Clover (December 22, 1837 – December 30, 1899) was a U.S. representative from Kansas.

Born near Jefferson, Ohio, Clover attended the common schools. He moved to Kansas in 1871 and settled in Cambridge. He engaged in agricultural pursuits. He served as member of the board of school commissioners 1873-1888. He was twice president of the Kansas State Farmers' Alliance and Industrial Union and twice vice president of the national organization of that order.

Clover was elected as a Populist to the Fifty-second Congress (March 4, 1891 – March 3, 1893). He was not a candidate for renomination in 1892. He resumed agricultural pursuits. He returned to Douglass, Kansas, where he committed suicide on December 30, 1899. He is interred in Douglass Cemetery.

== Notes ==
U.S. House of Representatives
Preceded by Bishop W. Perkins	Member of the U.S. House of Representatives from Kansas's 3rd congressional district March 4, 1891 – March 3, 1893	Succeeded by Thomas J. Hudson
