= Ernest F. Acheson =

American politician (1855–1917)

Ernest Francis Acheson
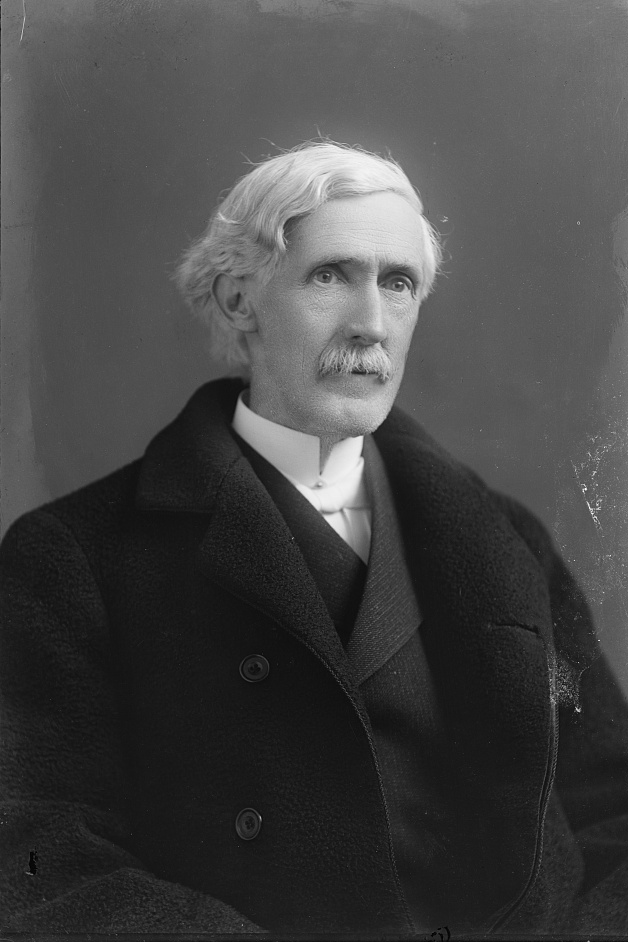

Member of the U.S. House of Representatives from Pennsylvania's 24th district
- In office March 4, 1895 – March 3, 1909
- Preceded by: William A. Sipe
- Succeeded by: John K. Tener

Personal details
- Born: September 19, 1855 Washington, Pennsylvania
- Died: May 16, 1917 (aged 61) Washington, Pennsylvania
- Party: Republican
- Education: Washington & Jefferson College

Ernest Francis Acheson (September 19, 1855 – May 16, 1917) was an American newspaper editor and politician, who served as a Pennsylvania representative to the United States House of Representatives.

== Biography ==
He was born in Washington, Pennsylvania on September 19, 1855, son of Alexander W. and Jane (Wishart) Acheson. He attended the public schools there, and then went on to Washington & Jefferson College in 1875.

He was an honorary graduate of Washington and Jefferson College in 1875; studied law with M. C. Acheson at Washington, Pennsylvania, was admitted to the bar in 1877 and practiced law there until 1879. He purchased the newspaper Washington Weekly Observer, of which he was editor. In 1889, he established a daily edition of the same paper. He received the honorary degree of A.M., from Washington and Jefferson College in 1889.

On November 22, 1882, he was married to Jannie B., daughter of Galbraith Stewart.

He was elected as a Republican to the United States House of Representatives in 1894, and continued to serve until 1909, having been an unsuccessful candidate for the nomination in 1908. Acheson was served in the 54th, 55th, 56th, 57th and 58th congresses. He became president of the Pennsylvania editorial association in January 1893, and recording secretary of the National Editorial Association in June 1893.

In 1909, he returned to editorial work until his retirement in 1912. He died in Washington, Pennsylvania, in 1917.

U.S. House of Representatives
| Preceded by William A. Sipe | Member of the U.S. House of Representatives from Pennsylvania's 24th congressional district 1895–1909 | Succeeded by John K. Tener |
