= George F. Kribbs =

American lawyer and politician

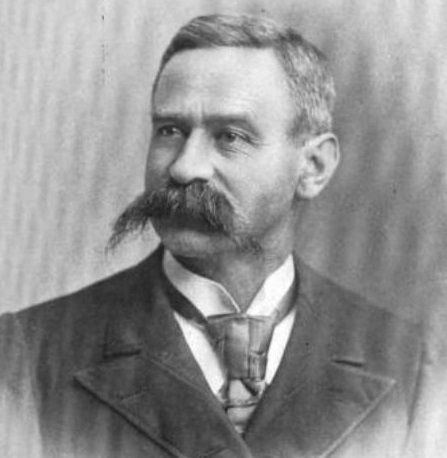

Member of the U.S. House of Representatives from Pennsylvania's 28th district
- In office March 4, 1891 – March 3, 1895
- Preceded by: James Kerr
- Succeeded by: William C. Arnold

Personal details
- Born: George Frederic Kribbs; November 8, 1846 Clarion County, Pennsylvania, US
- Died: September 8, 1938 (aged 91) Kissimmee, Florida, US
- Resting place: Violet Hill Cemetery
- Party: Democratic
- Education: Muhlenberg College

George Frederic Kribbs (November 8, 1846 – September 8, 1938) was an American lawyer and politician who served two terms as a Democratic member of the U.S. House of Representatives from Pennsylvania from 1891 to 1895.

== Biography ==
George F. Kribbs was born on a farm in Clarion County, Pennsylvania. He attended the common schools and the Emlenton Academy and graduated from Muhlenberg College in Allentown, Pennsylvania, in 1873. He studied law, was admitted to the bar in 1875 and commenced practice in Clarion, Pennsylvania.

He was elected as mayor of Clarion in 1876 and again in 1889. He edited the Clarion Democrat from 1877 to 1889.

=== Congress ===
Kribbs was elected as a Democrat to the Fifty-second and Fifty-third Congresses, serving from 1891 to 1895. He was an unsuccessful candidate for renomination in 1894.

=== Later career ===
He resumed the practice of law in Clarion, and again served as mayor. He was president of the board of directors of the Clarion State Normal School. He moved to Osceola County, Florida, in 1896 and engaged in growing oranges. He re-engaged the practice of law located in Kissimmee, Florida, in 1907. He served as prosecuting attorney of Osceola County in 1908, and judge of the county court in 1909 and 1910. He resigned and resumed the practice of law in Kissimmee until 1926 when he retired.

=== Death and burial ===
He died in Kissimmee in 1938, and was interred in Violet Hill Cemetery.

== Sources ==
- United States Congress. "George F. Kribbs (id: K000330)". Biographical Directory of the United States Congress.
- The Political Graveyard

U.S. House of Representatives
Preceded by James Kerr	Member of the U.S. House of Representatives from Pennsylvania's 28th congressional district 1891–1895	Succeeded by William C. Arnold
