= James Knox Polk Hall =

American politician

James K. P. Hall
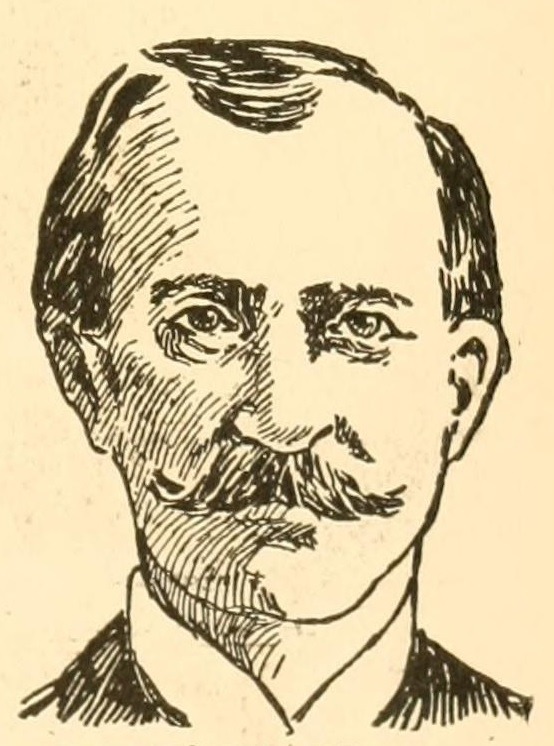

Member of the U.S. House of Representatives from Pennsylvania's 28th district
- In office March 4, 1899 – November 29, 1902
- Preceded by: William Carlile Arnold
- Succeeded by: Joseph C. Sibley

Member of the Pennsylvania House of Representatives
- In office 1902–1914

Personal details
- Born: September 30, 1844 Milesburg, Pennsylvania, U.S.
- Died: January 5, 1915 (aged 70) Tampa, Florida, U.S.
- Party: Democratic

James Knox Polk Hall (September 30, 1844 – January 5, 1915) was a Democratic member of the U.S. House of Representatives from Pennsylvania.

== Biography ==
James K. P. Hall was born in Milesburg, Pennsylvania. He was educated in Pittsburgh, Pennsylvania. He studied law and was admitted to the bar in 1866. He was elected district attorney of Elk County, Pennsylvania in 1867, and reelected in 1870 and 1873. He retired from the practice of law in 1883 to engage in the coal, lumber, and railroad businesses as well as banking.

Hall was elected as a Democrat to the Fifty-sixth and Fifty-seventh Congresses and served until his resignation. He was a member of the Pennsylvania State Senate from 1902 to 1914. He died in Tampa, Florida, in 1915. Interment in Pine Grove Cemetery, Ridgway, Pennsylvania.

== Sources ==
- United States Congress. "James K. P. Hall (id: H000054)". Biographical Directory of the United States Congress.
- The Political Graveyard

U.S. House of Representatives
Preceded by William C. Arnold	Member of the U.S. House of Representatives from Pennsylvania's 28th congressional district 1899–1902	Succeeded by Joseph C. Sibley
