= William A. Sipe =

American soldier, lawyer, and politician

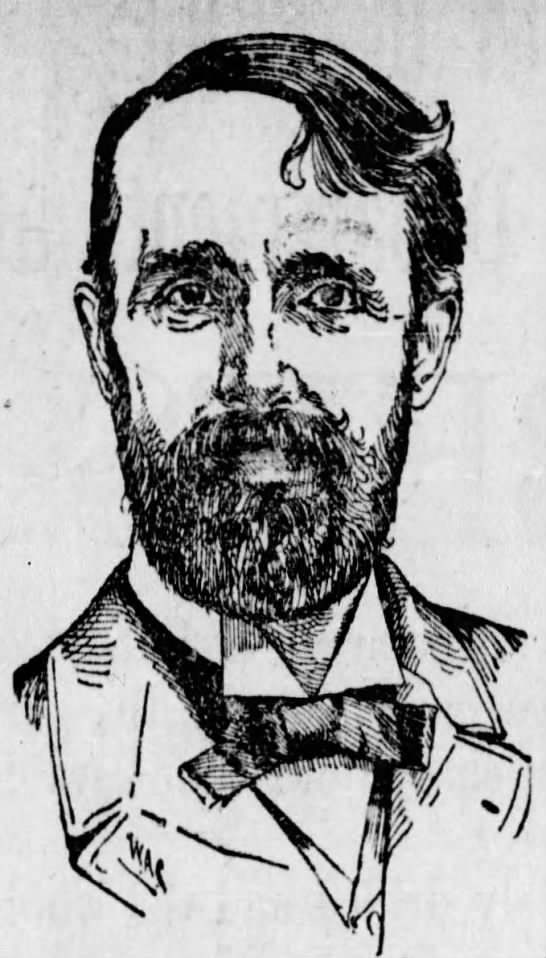
The Pittsburgh Press, October 28, 1892

William Allen Sipe (July 1, 1844 – September 10, 1935) was a Democratic member of the U.S. House of Representatives from Pennsylvania.

== Biography ==
William A. Sipe was born near Harrisonville, Pennsylvania. He attended the public schools, and Cassville Academy in Cassville, Pennsylvania. He enlisted in the Union Army in 1862 and served in Company K, One Hundred and Forty-ninth Regiment, Pennsylvania Volunteer Infantry. He was discharged for disability the same year. He studied law, was admitted to the bar in August 1865 and practiced in Huntingdon, Pennsylvania. He moved to Indianapolis, Indiana, in January 1867, and then to Pittsburgh, Pennsylvania, in December 1868, and continued the practice of law.

Sipe was elected as a Democrat to the Fifty-second Congress to fill the vacancy caused by the death of Alexander K. Craig. He was reelected to the Fifty-third Congress. He was an unsuccessful candidate for reelection in 1894. He resumed the practice of law in Pittsburgh until he retired in 1921. He moved to San Diego, California, where he died on in 1935. Interment in Highwood Cemetery in Pittsburgh.

U.S. House of Representatives
Preceded by Alexander K. Craig	Member of the U.S. House of Representatives from Pennsylvania's 24th congressional district 1892–1895	Succeeded by Ernest F. Acheson
