= Thomas Jefferson Hudson =

American politician (1839–1923)

Thomas J. Hudson
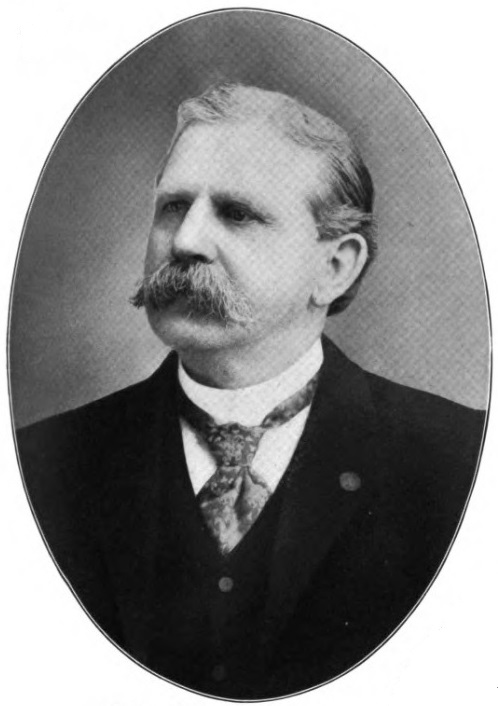

Member of the U.S. House of Representatives from Kansas's 3rd district
- In office March 4, 1893 – March 3, 1895
- Preceded by: Benjamin H. Clover
- Succeeded by: Snyder S. Kirkpatrick

Personal details
- Born: October 30, 1839 Jamestown, Indiana
- Died: January 4, 1923 (aged 83) Wichita, Kansas
- Party: Populist

Thomas Jefferson Hudson (October 30, 1839 – January 4, 1923) was a U.S. representative from Kansas.

Born near Jamestown, Indiana, Hudson attended Lebanon (Indiana) Academy and Wabash College, Crawfordsville, Indiana. He moved to Nodaway, Missouri, in 1854. He spent much of the Civil War on an unexplained mission in Nevada. He moved to Coyville, Kansas, in 1866 and taught in the first county school. He studied law. He was admitted to the bar in Iola, Kansas, in June 1869. He moved to Fredonia, Kansas, in 1869 and commenced practice. Aided in the adoption of the Fifteenth amendment. Treasurer and member of the first Fredonia school board in the early seventies. He served as a member of the State house of representatives in 1870. He served as mayor of Fredonia in 1871. Organized the Wilson County Bank in Fredonia in 1871. He was graduated from the law department of the university of Cincinnati, Ohio, in 1874. He served as prosecuting attorney for Wilson County 1884–1886. He served as a delegate to the Democratic National Conventions in 1884, 1888, and 1896.

Hudson was elected as a Populist to the Fifty-third Congress (March 4, 1893 – March 3, 1895). He was not a candidate for renomination in 1894. He resumed the practice of law in Fredonia. He served as a Regent of the State college of agriculture in 1897 and 1898. He died in Wichita, Kansas on January 4, 1923. He was interred in Fredonia Cemetery, Fredonia, Kansas.

U.S. House of Representatives
Preceded by Benjamin H. Clover	Member of the U.S. House of Representatives from Kansas's 3rd congressional district March 4, 1893 – March 3, 1895	Succeeded by Snyder S. Kirkpatrick
