= Snyder S. Kirkpatrick =

American politician

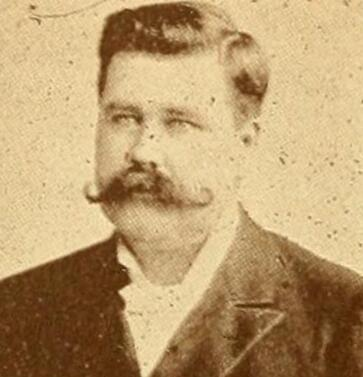
- Kirkpatrick in an 1896 publication

Member of the U.S. House of Representatives from Kansas's 3rd district
- In office March 4, 1895 – March 3, 1897
- Preceded by: Thomas Jefferson Hudson
- Succeeded by: Edwin R. Ridgely

Member of the Kansas House of Representatives
- In office 1889 – 1893

Personal details
- Born: Snyder Solomon Kirkpatrick; February 21, 1848 Mulkeytown, Illinois, U.S.
- Died: April 5, 1909 (aged 61) Fredonia, Kansas, U.S.
- Resting place: Fredonia Cemetery
- Party: Republican
- Education: University of Michigan

Snyder Solomon Kirkpatrick (February 21, 1848 – April 5, 1909) was an American attorney, Civil War veteran and politician who served one term as a U.S. representative from Kansas from 1895 to 1897.

== Early life and education ==
Kirkpatrick was born near Mulkeytown, Illinois, to John Foster Kirkpatrick and Hester Ann Dial Kirkpatrick. He attended public schools schools.

=== Civil War ===
During the Civil War, he served as a private in Company A of the 136th Illinois Cavalry Regiment from April to October 1864. He re-enlisted in the 20th Illinois Cavalry but that had been filled before he reached rendezvous with the regiment. He tried again for the 63rd Regiment of Infantry in which his brothers William A. and Reuben D. were serving, but before he arrived to serve with that regiment the war had ended.

=== Career ===
Kirkpatrick engaged in mercantile pursuits at Du Quoin, Illinois, from 1865 to 1867. He entered the law school at the University of Michigan in 1867 before returning to Illinois. He was admitted to the bar by the supreme court of Illinois on June 30, 1868, and commenced practice at Cairo, Illinois.

In 1873, Kirkpatrick moved to Kansas and settled in Fredonia, engaging in the practice of law. He was elected prosecuting attorney of Wilson County in 1880, and served as a member of the Kansas State Senate from 1889 to 1893. He was an attorney for the St. Louis and San Francisco Railway Company for many years.

=== Congress ===
Kirkpatrick was an unsuccessful candidate for election in 1892 to the Fifty-third Congress. He was then elected as a Republican to the Fifty-fourth Congress (March 4, 1895 – March 3, 1897). He ran for reelection to the Fifty-fifth Congress and for election to the Fifty-sixth and Fifty-seventh Congresses but was unsuccessful.

=== Later career ===
Kirkpatrick served as member of the Kansas House of Representatives from 1903 to 1905.

== Personal life ==
On December 25, 1867, he married Rosa H. Bowen in Mattoon, Coles Co., IL. Rosa and Solomon has five children: Elsie; Otto; Mark; Byron; and Hobert. Rosa died at Fredonia on February 13, 1887. Kirkpatrick remarried. His second wife was Mrs. Floren Adell (Oakford) Buker of Chicago.

=== Death and burial ===
Kirkpatrick died in Fredonia, Kansas, on April 5, 1909, and was interred in Fredonia Cemetery.

U.S. House of Representatives
Preceded by Thomas J. Hudson	Member of the U.S. House of Representatives from Kansas's 3rd congressional district March 4, 1895 – March 3, 1897	Succeeded by Edwin R. Ridgely
