= Security: Politics, Humanity, and the Philology of Care =

2013 book by John T. Hamilton

- Cover
- Author: John T. Hamilton
- Language: English
- Series: Translation/Transnation
- Subject: Security, politics, philology
- Genre: Non-fiction
- Publisher: Princeton University Press
- Publication date: 5 May 2013
- Publication place: United States
- Media type: Print (Hardcover, Paperback), eBook
- Pages: 336
- ISBN: 9780691157528

Security: Politics, Humanity, and the Philology of Care is book by American literary scholar and musician John T. Hamilton. It was published in 2013 by Princeton University Press. The book offers a philological exploration of the concept of security, a term frequently invoked in contemporary political and cultural discourse yet one that remains largely undefined. Hamilton delves into the historical and linguistic origins of the word, analyzing its dual connotations of meaning both "carefree" and "careless." Spanning a wide range of texts from ancient Greek poetry to the works of modern philosophers such as Kant, Nietzsche, and Heidegger, the book critically examines how security is intertwined with notions of safety, negligence, confidence, and ignorance. Hamilton questions whether the pursuit of security, often at the expense of freedom and human rights, truly alleviates fear or exacerbates it, and whether contemporary obsessions with achieving absolute security pose significant risks to society.

== Summary ==
The book explores the multifaceted and often ambiguous concept of security. Through a philological and philosophical lens, Hamilton examines how the notion of security has evolved over time, tracing its origins and various interpretations from ancient Greek and Roman texts to modern political and intellectual thought.

The book is divided into three parts. In the first part, "Preliminary Concerns," Hamilton discusses the broad and versatile nature of security, highlighting how the term is employed in various contexts, including national, social, and cyber-security. He argues that security, originating from the Latin securitas (meaning "freedom from care"), inherently carries a dual meaning: it can imply both a state of being carefree and a dangerous form of negligence. This section also contrasts philological approaches to security with more rigid political interpretations, questioning whether the pursuit of absolute security undermines the very freedoms it aims to protect.

The second part, "Etymologies and Figures," delves deeper into the historical and semantic roots of the term. Hamilton provides a detailed examination of the word securitas as used by Roman authors like Cicero and Seneca, exploring its connotations of mental tranquility and its implications in both public and private life. The section further investigates how literary and philosophical texts from the Greco-Roman period portray security in relation to other concepts, such as stability and instability, land and sea, and the familiar versus the unknown.

In the third part, "Occupying Security," Hamilton addresses the modern implications of security, focusing on how the concept has been shaped by political events and ideologies. He critiques the ways in which contemporary society's obsession with security has led to paradoxical outcomes, such as the erosion of civil liberties in the name of protection. Hamilton goes on to examine the tension between security and freedom, drawing on historical examples and philosophical arguments to suggest that an overemphasis on security can lead to the very dangers it seeks to prevent.

Throughout the book, Hamilton argues that the pursuit of security often serves as a distraction from the inherent uncertainties of human existence. He posits that rather than seeking to eliminate all risks, society might benefit from embracing a certain level of insecurity as a natural and valuable aspect of life. By combining philological analysis with philosophical inquiry, Security: Politics, Humanity, and the Philology of Care offers a thought-provoking critique of one of the most pervasive and yet least understood concepts in contemporary discourse.

== Critical reception ==
Henrik S. Wilberg commended the book for its nuanced and in-depth exploration of the concept of security from a philological perspective. He valued Hamilton's approach, which avoided reducing security to oversimplified or non-philological frameworks. Instead, Hamilton's study offers an episodic and multifaceted examination that draws from diverse historical and intellectual contexts. Wilberg highlighted how Hamilton effectively intertwined the ideas of security and care, seamlessly merging philological methods with philosophical inquiry.

Ellwood Wiggins lauded the book as a masterfully crafted and intellectually stimulating work, delving into the intricate layers and paradoxes surrounding the concept of security. Wiggins appreciated how Hamilton employed philology to trace the historical and linguistic origins of security, navigating through a wide range of texts and ideas from antiquity to the present day. He particularly admired Hamilton's skill in uncovering unexpected connections between various authors and eras, as well as his insightful critique of modern security practices. Despite noting some organizational challenges, Wiggins found the work to be a significant and illuminating contribution to the fields of security studies and philology.

Hall Bjornstad regarded the book as an original and scholarly contribution, offering a meticulous and thoughtful analysis of security through a philological lens. Bjornstad was impressed by Hamilton's ability to trace the term "security" back to its etymological roots in "cura," meaning care or concern. He praised the book for its rich and detailed exploration of a wide array of texts, languages, and historical contexts, ranging from ancient Greek poetry to modern philosophical thought. Despite the book's episodic nature, Bjornstad found it to be a deeply enriching read that prompts readers to engage in further reflection, marking it as a significant work in contemporary philology and security studies.

Pirathees Sivarajah described the book as a profound investigation into the concept of security, emphasizing its inherent ambiguities and contradictions. Sivarajah appreciated Hamilton's philological approach to dissecting the term "security" and its various historical, cultural, and political connotations. He noted how Hamilton skillfully portrayed security as a concept that oscillates between care and carelessness, presenting it as both a promise and a potential threat to humanity. The review praised the book for its intellectual depth and its ability to provoke thoughtful consideration of the role and impact of security in modern society.
