= John T. Hamilton =

American scholar and musician (born 1936)

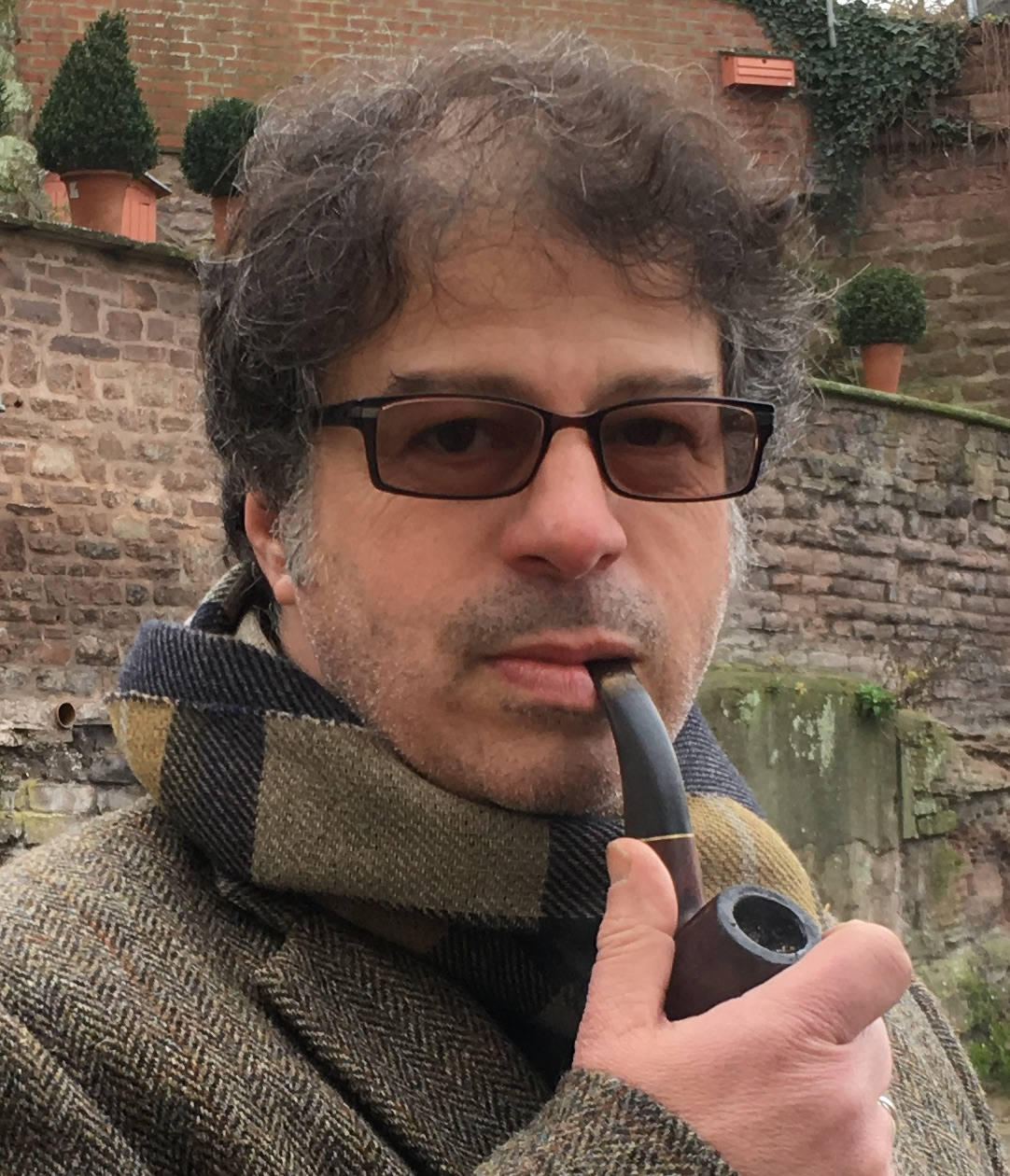
- Hamilton in 2018
- Born: March 1, 1963 (age 63); Bronx, New York, U.S.
- Known for: Scholarship in 18th- and 19th-century literature, Classical Philology, Music and Literature, Literary Theory
- Title: William R. Kenan Professor of German and Comparative Literature
- Awards: Multiple academic fellowships including Wissenschaftskolleg zu Berlin, ETH Zürich, Zentrum für Literatur- und Kulturforschung Berlin, and Hamburg Institute for Advanced Study

Academic background
- Education: New York University (Ph.D. in Comparative Literature, 1999)
- Doctoral advisor: Richard Sieburth

Academic work
- Discipline: Literature
- Sub-discipline: Comparative Literature, German Literature, Classical Philology, Music and Literature
- Institutions: Harvard University, University of California, Santa Cruz, New York University, Bristol University
- Notable works: Soliciting Darkness: Pindar, Obscurity, and the Classical Tradition (2004), Music, Madness, and the Unworking of Language (2008), Security: Politics, Humanity, and the Philology of Care (2013)
- Website: Harvard Faculty Page

John T. Hamilton (born March 1, 1963, Bronx, NY) is a literary scholar, musician, and William R. Kenan Professor of German and Comparative Literature at Harvard University. He previously held positions at the University of California-Santa Cruz (in Classics) and New York University (Comparative Literature and German), and has also taught as a visiting professor at the Institute of Greece, Rome, and the Classical Tradition at Bristol University. Numerous academic fellowships include the Wissenschaftskolleg zu Berlin, the ETH-Zürich, the Zentrum für Literatur- und Kulturforschung Berlin, and the Hamburg Institute for Advanced Study.

Hamilton received his doctorate in Comparative Literature at New York University in 1999 under the directorship of Richard Sieburth. Primary teaching and research topics include 18th- and 19th-century Literature, Classical Philology and Reception History, Music and Literature, Literary Theory and Political Metaphorology.

From 1985 to 1996 Hamilton was the guitarist and principal songwriter, together with Donna Croughn, for the band Tiny Lights, based in Hoboken, New Jersey.

== Scholarship ==
In Soliciting Darkness: Pindar, Obscurity, and the Classical Tradition (2004), Hamilton offers a broad investigation of Pindar, the archaic Greek lyric poet, and his long reception history in European literature and scholarship, addressing a variety of pressing issues, including the recovery and appropriation of classical texts, problems of translation, representations of lyric authenticity, and the possibility or impossibility of a continuous literary tradition. The poetics of obscurity that comes to be articulated across the centuries suggests that taking Pindar to be an incomprehensible poet may not simply be the result of an insufficient or false reading, but rather may serve as a wholly adequate judgment.

Music, Madness, and the Unworking of Language (2008) grapples with Romantic figurations of the mad musician, which challenge the limits of representation and thereby instigate a profound crisis in language. Special attention is given to the decidedly autobiographical impulse of the late eighteenth and early nineteenth centuries, where musical experience and mental disturbance disrupt the expression of referential thought, illuminating the irreducible aspects of the self before language can work them back into a discursive system.

A philological approach motivates Security: Politics, Humanity, and the Philology of Care (2013), which examines the discursive versatility and semantic vagueness of the term security both in current and historical usage. Hamilton explores the fundamental ambiguity of this word, which denotes the removal of "concern" or "care" and therefore implies a condition that is either carefree or careless. Spanning texts from ancient Greek poetry to Roman Stoicism, from Augustine and Luther to Machiavelli and Hobbes, from Kant and Nietzsche to Heidegger and Carl Schmitt, the study analyzes formulations of security that involve both safety and negligence, confidence and complacency, certitude and ignorance.

The philological attention to a single term drives two subsequent studies, On Complacency (Über die Selbstgefälligkeit, 2021) and Complacency: Classics and its Displacement in Higher Education (2022). Both works compare the superiority of the classical curriculum in prior centuries with the current hegemony of mathematics and the sciences—how qualitative methods of teaching and research relate to the quantitative positivism of big data, statistical reasoning, and presumably neutral abstraction, which risk dismissing humanist subjectivity and legitimizing self-sufficiency. Throughout, emphasis is placed on a persistent paronomasia that relates the Latin verb for pleasing (placere) to adjectives describing flatness (e.g., Greek plax, plakos and platys, Latin planus). The governing metaphor implies that pleasing experiences are akin to traversing a flattened area without bumps or disruptions. Complacency thus points to the pleasant delusion that one proceeds through a two-dimensional realm where disturbances are ignored or dismissed. A central text is the satirical novel Flatland (1884) by Edwin Abbott Abbott.

Philology of the Flesh (2018) reflects on the poetic implications and ramifications of the incarnational metaphor, whereby the Word is said to become flesh. By pressing the notion of philology as "love" (philia) for the "word" (logos), Hamilton's readings investigate the breadth, depth, and limits of verbal styles that are irreducible to mere information. While a philologist of the body might understand words as corporeal vessels of core meaning, the philologist of the flesh, by focusing on the carnal qualities of language, resists taking words as mere containers. Textual analyses include readings of Lorenzo Valla, Johann Georg Hamann and Immanuel Kant, Friedrich Nietzsche, Franz Kafka, Emily Dickinson and Paul Celan.

In France/Kafka: An Author in Theory (2023), Hamilton recounts how a German writer of Jewish descent in Prague came to serve as an urgent obsession in the literary and intellectual capital of Paris, how a writer of relative obscurity, one who barely published during his all-too-brief lifetime, emerged within years after his death to be hailed as a central figure in the European literary canon. Accordingly, what has come to be known as French Theory is shown to have drawn fundamental impetus from Kafka's texts, from existentialism to post-structuralism. In a crucial sense, Kafka turns out to be the spiritual godfather of the theoretical models that continue to shape our reading practices.

Hamilton returns to classical reception theory in Without Within: Parenthetic Interferences in Reception History (2025), which employs the figure of the parenthesis as a paradigm for broaching fresh lines of inquiry into the roles of classical antiquity in modernity, with particular focus on postwar Germany. As the double prefixes of the term reveal, a parenthetic statement is simultaneously situated outside (para) and inside (en), too marginal to be incorporated into the main discourse yet too important to eliminate, dismissible but not dismissed. Parenthetic interferences thus challenge the tenets of strict historicism, which keeps antiquity at a distance, and aestheticism, which indulges in the continued presence of the past. As a parenthesis the past and present subsist as a part of each other by remaining apart from each other.

== Books ==
- Soliciting Darkness: Pindar, Obscurity, and the Classical Tradition (Cambridge: Harvard University Press, 2004), ISBN 978-0674012578. According to WorldCat, the book is held in 257 libraries Translated into Chinese, by Lin Lou, as 幽暗的诱惑 : 品达、晦涩与古典传统 / You an de you huo : Pindar, hui se yu gu dian chuan tong ISBN 9787508057033
- Music, Madness, and the Unworking of Language (New York: Columbia University Press, 2008), ISBN 978-0231142205 According to WorldCat, the book is held in 449 libraries. Translated into German as Musik, Wahnsinn und das Ausserkraftsetzen der Sprache (2011) ISBN 9783835308282
- Security: Politics, Humanity, and the Philology of Care (Princeton: Princeton University Press, 2013) ISBN 9780691157528 According to WorldCat, the book is held in 749 libraries.
- Philology of the Flesh (Chicago: The University of Chicago Press, 2018) ISBN 978-0-226-57282-6
- Über die Selbstgefälligkeit (Berlin: Matthes & Seitz, 2021) ISBN 978-3-75180-503-2
- Complacency: Classics and Its Displacement in Higher Education (Chicago: The University of Chicago Press, 2022) ISBN 978-0-226-81862-7
- France/Kafka: An Author in Theory (New York: Bloomsbury, 2023) ISBN 979-8-7651-0037-0
- Without Within: Parenthetic Interferences in Reception History (New Alexandria Foundation/Harvard, 2025)ISBN 978-0-6743-0127-6

== Selected articles ==
- "Poetica obscura: Reexamining Hamann's Contribution to the Pindaric Tradition," Eighteenth-Century Studies 34:1 (2000), 93–115.
- "Temple du Temps: Valéry et le Verbe opaque" in Poétiques de l'objet: L'Objet dans la poésie française du Moyen Âge au XXe siècle, François Rouget, ed. Paris : Champion, 2001, 155–64.
- "Thunder from a Clear Sky: On Lessing's Redemption of Horace" Modern Language Quarterly 62:3 (2001), 203–218.
- "Modernity, Translation, and Poetic Prose in Lessing's Briefe, die neueste Literatur betreffend," Lessing Jahrbuch 36 (2004/2005), 79–96.
- "Canis canens, oder Kafkas Respekt vor der Musikwissenschaft," Kafkas Institutionen, Arne Höcker and Oliver Simons, ed., Bielefeld: Transcript, 2007, 145–156.
- "Philology and Music in the Work of Pascal Quignard," Studies in Twentieth- and Twenty-first-Century Literature 33 (2009), 43–67.
- "Music on Location: Rhythm, Resonance, and Romanticism in Eichendorff's Marmorbild," Modern Language Quarterly 70 (2009): 195–221.
- "Ovids Echographie" in Narziss und Eros. Bild oder Text?, Eckart Goebel and Elisabeth Bronfen, ed., Göttingen: Wallstein, 2009, 18–40.
- "O mi fili, o mi discipule! Der Vater als Philosophiemeister im alten Rom," Meister und Schüler in Geschichte und Gegenwart: Von Religionen der Antike bis zur modernen Esoterik, A.-B. Renger, ed., Göttingen: V&R Unipress, 2012, 69–80.
- "Reception, Gratitude and Obligation: Lessing and the Classical Tradition," Studies in Voltaire and the Eighteenth Century (2013), 81–96.
- "Der pythogoreische Kult und die akousmatische Mitteilung von Wissen," Performanz von Wissen: Strategien der Wissensvermittlung in der Vormoderne, T. Fuhrer and A.-B. Renger, ed., Heidelberg: Winter, 2013, 49–54.
- "Gambara de Balzac, ou Le Chef-d'œuvre 'inentendu': pour une esthétique noétique," in Théories de la littérature: nouveaux éléments de vocabulaire, Emmanuel Bouju, ed. (Rennes, 2015).
- "Repetitio Sententiarum, Repetitio Verborum: Kant, Hamann, and the Implications of Citation," German Quarterly 87:3 (2014), 297–312.
- "Omnia mea mecum porto: Exile, Culture, and the Precarity of Life," Ethos Quarterly 108 (2014), 95–107.
- "Ellipses of World Literature," Poetica 46 (2014), 1–16.
- "Cléopâtre pour Cléopâtre: Das innere Absolute und die Wiederbelebung der Zivilisation in Gautiers Une nuit de Cléopâtre" in Translatio Babylonis: Unsere orientalische Moderne, Barbara Vinken, ed. Paderborn: Fink, 2014.
- "Procuratores: On the Limits of Caring for Another," Telos 170 (2015), 1–16.
- "Torture as an Instrument of Music," in Liminal Auralities: Sounds, Technics, and Space, Sander van Maas, ed. New York: Fordham University Press, 2015, 143–52.
- "'Cette douceur, pour ainsi dire wagnérienne': Musical Resonance in Proust's Recherche" in Proust and the Arts, Christie McDonald and François Proulx, ed., Cambridge: Cambridge University Press, 2015, 90–100.
- "Rahmen, Küsten, und Nachhaltigkeiten in Theodor Storms Der Schimmelreiter," Weimarer Beiträge (2015), 165–80.
- "Voluptas Carnis: Allegory and Non-Knowledge in Pieter Aertsen's Paintings," in Ignorance, Nescience, Nonknowledge, Cornel Zwierlein, ed., Leiden: Brill, 2016, 179–96.
- "Cross against Corslet: Elgar, Longfellow, and the Saga of King Olaf," Elgar Society Journal 21 (2018), 1–15.
- "Carmina carnis: Der rote Ursprung der lebendigen Sprache bei Hölderlin" in Körper/Zeichen, Sophie Witt, ed. Special edition of figurationen: gender – literatur – kultur 19:2 (2018).
- "Aspects of Reception: Reading Goethe's Iphigenie auf Tauris with Adorno, Fassbinder, and Jauss," Classical Receptions Journal 12 (2020), 129–148.
- "Florilegia: Influence and Cross-Pollination between Celan and Hölderlin, Pindar and Horace," Modern Language Notes 135 (2020), 600–619.
- "Heidegger in Klammern, oder Wozu Philologen in dürftiger Zeit," Hölderlin-Jahrbuch 42 (2021), 21–39.
