= Lancaster, Illinois =

Lancaster
- Unincorporated community
- Location of Lancaster within Illinois Lancaster (the United States)
- Coordinates: 38°32′52″N 87°51′55″W
- Country: United States
- State: Illinois
- County: Wabash
- Precinct: Lancaster
- Elevation: 486 ft (148 m)
- Time zone: UTC-6 (CST)
  - Summer (DST): UTC-5 (CDT)
- Postal code: 62855
- Area code: 618
- GNIS feature ID: 411789

Lancaster is an unincorporated community in Wabash County, Illinois, United States. Lancaster is located 9 miles west of Allendale and 12 miles northwest of Mt. Carmel.
