= Bishop W. Perkins =

American politician (1841–1894)

Bishop Walden Perkins
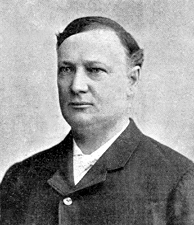

United States Senator from Kansas
- In office January 1, 1892 – March 3, 1893
- Appointed by: Lyman U. Humphrey
- Preceded by: Preston B. Plumb
- Succeeded by: John Martin

Member of the U.S. House of Representatives from Kansas
- In office March 4, 1883 – March 3, 1891
- Preceded by: Stephen A. Cobb (AL); Thomas Ryan (3rd)
- Succeeded by: District eliminated (AL); Benjamin H. Clover (3rd)
- Constituency: At-large district (1883-85); 3rd district (1885-91)

Personal details
- Born: October 18, 1841 Rochester, Ohio, U.S.
- Died: June 20, 1894 (aged 52) Washington, D.C., U.S.
- Resting place: Rock Creek Cemetery; Washington, D.C., U.S.
- Party: Republican

Bishop Walden Perkins (October 18, 1841 – June 20, 1894) was a United States representative and Senator from Kansas. Born in Rochester, Ohio, he attended the common schools and Knox College (Galesburg, Illinois). He prospected for gold through California and New Mexico from 1860 to 1862 and served four years in the Union Army during the Civil War as sergeant, adjutant, and captain. He studied law in Ottawa, Illinois and was admitted to the bar in 1867, commencing the practice of law in Princeton, Indiana. He moved to Oswego, Kansas, and continued practice; he was a local county attorney for the Missouri, Kansas & Texas Railroad for two years and prosecuting attorney of Labette County in 1869. He was a judge of the probate court of Labette County from 1870 to 1882, and became editor of the Oswego Register in 1873.

Perkins was elected as a Republican to the Forty-eighth and to the three succeeding Congresses, serving from March 4, 1883 – March 3, 1891. He was an unsuccessful candidate for reelection in 1890 to the Fifty-second Congress, but was appointed to the U.S. Senate to fill the vacancy caused by the death of Preston B. Plumb, and served from January 1, 1892, to March 3, 1893, when a successor was elected and qualified. He resumed the practice of his profession in Washington, D.C., and died there in 1894; interment was in Rock Creek Cemetery.

U.S. House of Representatives
Preceded by William A. Phillips	Member of the U.S. House of Representatives from Kansas's at-large congressional district March 4, 1883 – March 3, 1885	Succeeded by seat eliminated
Preceded by Thomas Ryan	Member of the U.S. House of Representatives from Kansas's 3rd congressional district March 4, 1885 – March 3, 1891	Succeeded by Benjamin H. Clover
U.S. Senate
Preceded by Preston B. Plumb	U.S. senator (Class 2) from Kansas; 1892–1893; Served alongside: William A. Peffer	Succeeded by John Martin
