= James Kerr (Pennsylvania politician) =

American politician

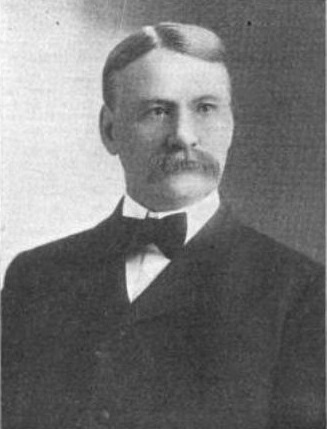

Clerk of the U.S. House of Representatives
- In office March 4, 1891 – March 3, 1895
- Speaker: Charles F. Crisp
- Preceded by: Edward McPherson
- Succeeded by: Alexander McDowell

Member of the U.S. House of Representatives from Pennsylvania's 28th district
- In office March 4, 1889 – March 3, 1891
- Preceded by: None
- Succeeded by: George Frederic Kribbs

Member of the Pennsylvania Senate
- In office 1869–1871

Personal details
- Born: October 2, 1851 Reedsville, Pennsylvania
- Died: October 31, 1908 (aged 57) New York City, New York
- Party: Democratic
- Children: 5, including Frederick

James Kerr (October 2, 1851 – October 31, 1908) was a member of the United States House of Representatives and later the Clerk of the United States House of Representatives.

== Biography ==
Kerr was born in Reedsville, Mifflin County, Pennsylvania, October 2, 1851; resided in Blair County until 1864; moved to Clearfield in 1867; pursued an academic course. He was a member of the Pennsylvania State Senate from 1869 to 1871. He was also a justice of the peace in 1878; prothonotary for Clearfield County in 1880 and 1883; engaged in the coal and lumber business; elected as a Democrat to the Fifty-first Congress (March 4, 1889 – March 3, 1891); unsuccessful candidate for renomination in 1890; during the Fifty-second and Fifty-third Congresses was appointed Clerk of the United States House of Representatives and served from March 4, 1891 to March 3, 1895; resumed business interests; died in New York City October 31, 1908; interment in Hillcrest Cemetery, Clearfield, Pennsylvania.

U.S. House of Representatives
Preceded by None	Member of the U.S. House of Representatives from Pennsylvania's 28th congressional district March 4, 1889 – March 3, 1891	Succeeded by George F. Kribbs
Government offices
Preceded by Edward McPherson	Clerk of the United States House of Representatives; March 4, 1891 – March 3, 1895	Succeeded by Alexander McDowell
