= 1st Iowa Cavalry Regiment =

- Flag of the United States (1863–1865)
- Active: 1861–1866
- Country: United States (Union)
- Allegiance: Iowa
- Branch: Volunteers
- Type: Cavalry
- Size: Regiment
- Equipment: Sharps Carbine, Saber
- Battles: American Civil War; Skirmish at Blackwater Creek; Battle of Roan's Tan Yard; Battle of Prairie Grove; Battle of Bayou Meto; Battle of Bayou Fourche; Battle of Elkin's Ferry; Battle of Prairie D'Ane

The 1st Iowa Cavalry Regiment was a cavalry regiment that served in the Union Army during the American Civil War.

== Service ==
The first Iowa Cavalry was organized at Davenport, Iowa in August and September 1861 and mustered in for three years of Federal service. Unusually for a Union cavalry regiment, the members of the regiment provided their own horses and equipment. The first Iowa was the first three-year cavalry regiment accepted for Federal service during the war.

The regiment was mustered out on February 15, 1866, while on Reconstruction duty in Austin, Texas, and discharged for state service on March 16, 1866.

== Detailed Service ==
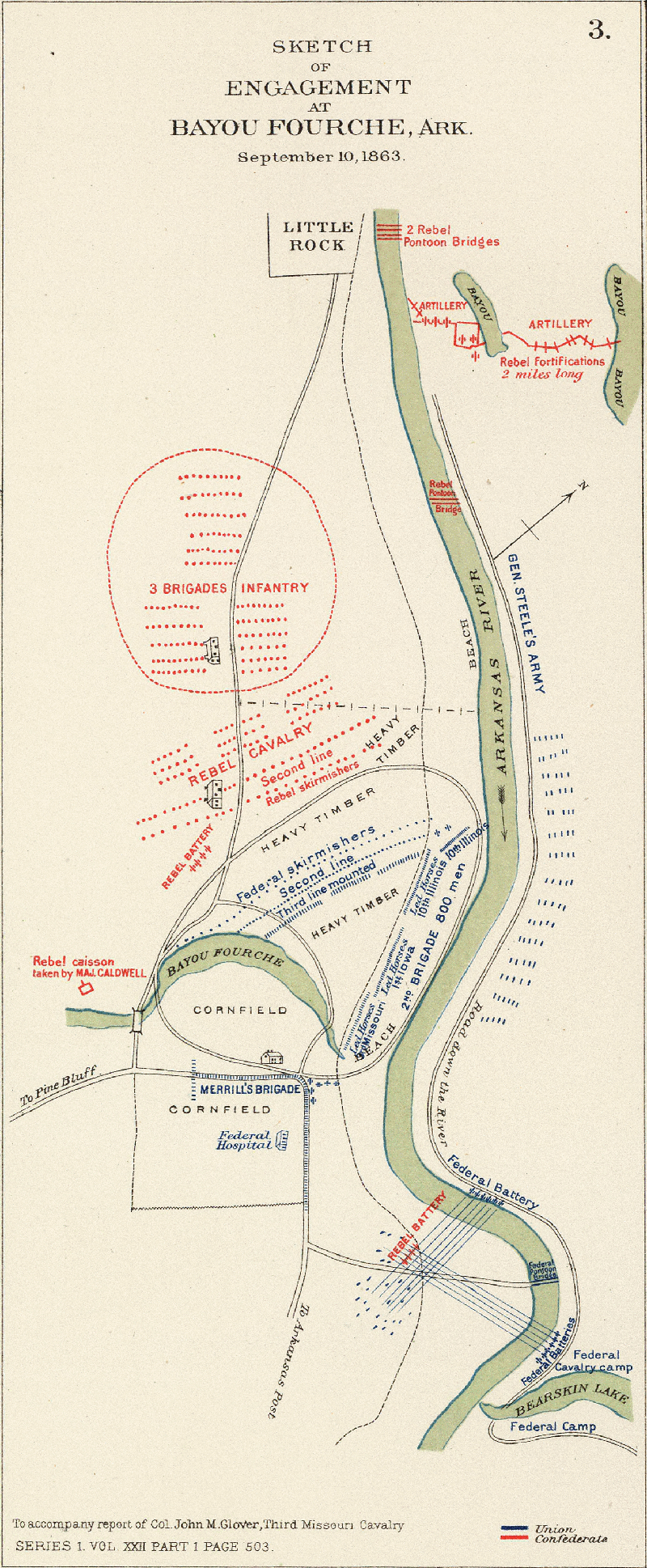
Sketch of Engagement at Bayou Fourche, Arkansas, September 10, 1863. To accompany report of Col. John M. Glover, Third Missouri Cavalry.

This famous regiment was organized June 5, 1861, and ordered into quarters at Benton Barracks near St. Louis about the middle of October in the same year. It was composed of twelve companies, aggregating 1,095 men, and by additional enlistments soon numbered 1,245. The middle and western portion of Missouri was the highway to the so-called Southern Confederacy for recruits, sympathizers and bushwhackers, and during the entire winter of 1861, eight companies of the regiment were engaged in patrolling this region.

Ever on the alert, their engagements and skirmishes were numerous. The first battle in which the regiment was engaged occurred on Black River (called Blackwater), where Cos. A, B. D, F. G and I, with about 60 of the 4th U. S. cavalry, attacked and captured about 1,300 Confederate recruits, 1,000 stands of arms and all the camp equipage. On January 8, 1862, a Confederate camp was attacked and destroyed on Silver Creek, Mo., and a week later the regiment was in a raid to Warsaw, where it attacked and captured the Confederate pickets, charged into town and captured several prisoners.

All of the early part of the following summer the regiment spent in scouts and raids, with here and there an important skirmish. In July the notorious guerrilla chief Quantrill was encountered by a few companies of the 1st cavalry on the wooded cliffs of Big Creek in Cass County. The regiment swept down on him like a whirlwind and in less than 30 minutes Quantrill and his band were scattered in all directions, the loss of the 1st IA being 2 killed and 10 wounded. A small detachment, sent out to capture some beef cattle belonging to Confederates, encountered a large band of guerrillas in the timber on Clear creek, about 2 miles from Taberville, and a short but spirited engagement ensued, in which the detachment was victorious, with a loss of 4 killed and 14 wounded.

In December the 1st took part in an important expedition to Van Buren, Ark., resulting in a defeat of some Confederates and the capture of immense stores. On August 18, 1862, the army crossed the White River at Clarendon, Ark., and on the 27th was fought the Battle of Bayou Meto, in which the regiment took a prominent part, driving the enemy across the bayou and making a dashing charge to save the only bridge across that deep and miry stream from destruction. In this charge the regiment lost 1 killed and 36 wounded, 1 mortally. The regiment then took the advance of the cavalry in the move on Little Rock.

On December 8 a force of 260 men, with detachments of other regiments and a section of artillery, marched toward Arkadelphia. A few miles south of Princeton, Dallas County, they encountered a force of the enemy numbering 800. The 1st IA cavalry being in the advance, dismounted and drove them from their position, taking 39 prisoners, together with arms and camp equipage.

In Jan., 1864, 500 of the regiment reenlisted and on March 23, waiving their right to a veteran furlough at that time, joined the 7th Army Corps and took a prominent part in all the operations of the Camden Expedition. In this movement the regiment engaged and routed Gen. Price's forces at Elkin's Ferry, losing in killed and wounded 11 men. It was again in the advance from this place to Prairie d'Ane, a distance of 12 miles, skirmishing with the enemy the entire distance. Being on the right in the engagement which followed, it was the first to enter the Confederate works. It was again ordered to the front and engaged the enemy at Camden Cross-Roads, about 15 miles from Camden, at 7 o'clock in the morning. The fight lasted for six hours, when Brig-Gen. Rice ordered up the dismounted men of the regiment to deploy as skirmishers, and the enemy, stubbornly contesting the ground, was driven back through the city of Camden on the evening of the same day. On the 17th a detachment of the regiment, with detachments of other regiments, marched about 20 miles down the Washita River and captured a steamboat laden with corn and other quartermaster and commissary supplies.

The loss of the regiment during this whole campaign was 5 killed, 3 taken prisoners and 25 wounded, a number severely, who died a few days afterward. The campaign being now virtually ended, the veteran portion of the regiment, 520 strong was relieved from duty and ordered home on veteran furlough.

On their way to Pine Bluff they were attacked by a column of Confederates at Moro Creek. After a heroic resistance they fell back to Steele's main army on its way to Little Rock, and with him engaged in the Battle of Saline River. On June 20 the regiment, its; furlough expired, again left the state for the front and on July 28 was at Macon, Mo. On January 14, 1865, a detachment of the 1st IA and other regiments, was ordered by boat about 100 miles up the Arkansas river to Dardanelle, at which place they engaged a Confederate force of 1,600 men under Gen. Cooper, killing and wounding 90.

By Feb. 17 the regiment had gone to Memphis, in the vicinity of which city it remained, scouting occasionally, till June 15, when Gen. Grant ordered the command to march from Alexandria, La., to Texas. On January 31, 1866, orders were received for muster-out.

== Total strength and casualties ==
A total of 2115 men served in the 1st Iowa at one time or another during its existence. It suffered 2 officers and 56 enlisted men who were killed in action or who died of their wounds and 2 officers and 233 enlisted men who died of disease, for a total of 293 fatalities.

== Commanders ==
- Colonel Fitz Henry Warren
- Colonel James O. Gower
- Colonel Anderson
- Colonel William Thompson
- Lieutenant Colonel Alexander G. McQueen
- Major William M. G. Torrence - commanded a battalion of the 1st Iowa Cavalry and ranking Union officer at the battle of Roan's Tan Yard

== See also ==
- List of Iowa Civil War Units
- Iowa in the American Civil War
