= 1884 Missouri Secretary of State election =

- November 4, 1884
Nominee	Michael Knowles McGrath
Party	Democratic
Popular vote	Unknown
Percentage	100.00%
Secretary of State before election
Michael Knowles McGrath
Democratic
Elected Secretary of State
Michael Knowles McGrath
Democratic

The 1884 Missouri Secretary of State election was held on November 4, 1884, in order to elect the secretary of state of Missouri. Democratic nominee and incumbent secretary of state Michael Knowles McGrath won re-election as he ran unopposed. The exact results of this election are unknown.

== General election ==
On election day, November 4, 1884, Democratic nominee Michael Knowles McGrath won re-election as he ran unopposed, thereby retaining Democratic control over the office of secretary of state. McGrath was sworn in for his fourth term on January 12, 1885.

=== Results ===
Missouri Secretary of State election, 1884
Party	Candidate	Votes	%
Democratic	Michael Knowles McGrath (incumbent)	Unknown	100.00
Total votes		Unknown	100.00
Democratic hold			

== See also ==
- 1884 Missouri gubernatorial election
