= Clarence Cannon =

American politician (1879–1964)

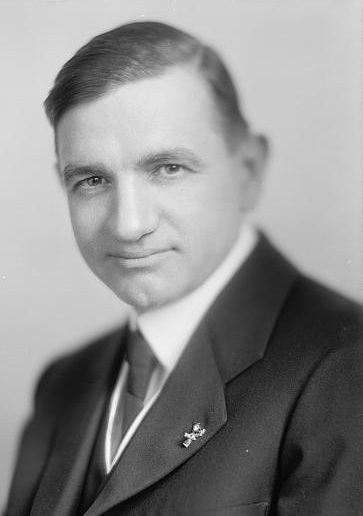

Chair of the House Appropriations Committee
- In office September 3, 1941 – January 3, 1947
- Preceded by: Edward T. Taylor
- Succeeded by: John Taber
- In office January 3, 1949 – January 3, 1953
- Preceded by: John Taber
- Succeeded by: John Taber
- In office January 3, 1955 – May 12, 1964
- Preceded by: John Taber
- Succeeded by: George H. Mahon

Member of the U.S. House of Representatives from Missouri
- In office March 4, 1923 – May 12, 1964
- Preceded by: Theodore W. Hukriede
- Succeeded by: William L. Hungate
- Constituency: 9th district (1923–1933); At-large (1933–1935); 9th district (1935–1964)

Personal details
- Born: April 11, 1879 Elsberry, Missouri, U.S.
- Died: May 12, 1964 (aged 85) Washington, D.C., U.S.
- Party: Democratic
- Spouse: Ida Dawson Wigginton (m. 1906)
- Children: 2

Clarence Andrew Cannon (April 11, 1879 – May 12, 1964) was a Democratic congressman from Missouri serving from 1923 until his death in Washington, D.C. in 1964. He was a notable parliamentarian and chaired the U.S. House Committee on Appropriations. He is the longest-serving member of the United States House of Representatives from the state of Missouri.

== Biography ==
Born in Elsberry, Missouri, the son of John Randolph Cannon, a farmer and merchant, and Ida Glovina Whiteside, a descendant of the Kemper family of Missouri and Germanna. Reflecting his family's influence and his rural, border-state background, Cannon maintained a lifelong devotion to the Southern Baptist faith and the Democratic Party. He also possessed a firm belief in the superiority of the agrarian lifestyle and small-town values. In 1901, Cannon graduated from La Grange Junior College (now known as Hannibal-LaGrange College) in Hannibal, Missouri, from William Jewell College in Liberty, Missouri in 1903, and from the law school of the University of Missouri in Columbia in 1908. After working as a high school teacher and principal, he served as an instructor of history at Stephens College in Columbia, Missouri from 1904 to 1908. Though he retained a lifelong interest in the American past and wrote several books on family and local history, Cannon deemed the academic life too sedentary. Accordingly, he studied law at the University of Missouri while teaching at Stephens College. He earned an LL.B. and joined the bar in 1908. He established a law practice in Troy, Missouri, but soon transferred it to his home town of Elsberry.

Cannon was initiated into the Alpha-Omega chapter of the Kappa Sigma fraternity while an undergraduate at William Jewell in 1903.

In 1906, Cannon married Ida Dawson Wigginton; they had two daughters. The couple formed a close working relationship. Ida Cannon became her husband's most trusted political adviser. Starting in the 1920s, she traveled extensively over the back-country roads of northeastern Missouri campaigning for her spouse, while he remained at his congressional desk in Washington, D.C.

== Politics ==
Cannon eagerly sought elective office, but his first two campaigns, for county school superintendent and state representative, ended in defeat. His political fortunes changed after his congressman, Champ Clark, hired him as a confidential secretary in 1911. When Democrats elected Clark Speaker of the House that year, Cannon found himself near the center of power in Washington.

Enjoying Clark's patronage, Cannon advanced to the positions of House journal clerk from 1914 to 1917 and House parliamentarian from 1917 to 1920. A quick study, he rapidly established himself as a leading authority on parliamentary procedure. His skills proved so impressive that the Republicans retained him after winning the House in 1918. In 1920 he became parliamentarian of the Democratic National Convention, a position he held through 1960. Cannon exercised lasting influence over the workings of Congress through publications such as Procedure in the House of Representatives (1920) and Cannon's Precedents of the House of Representatives (1936). After resigning as House parliamentarian, Cannon returned to his law practice in Elsberry.

Clark was defeated by Republican Theodore W. Hukriede in the 1920 Republican landslide. Cannon challenged Hukriede for his mentor's seat in the House of Representatives in 1922 and won. Popular with his constituents, he repeatedly won reelection, often without opposition, until his death.

== Years in Congress ==
Heeding the concerns of his rural district, Cannon emerged as a leading advocate of agricultural interests. He supported parity payments to maintain farmers' incomes, low-interest federal farm loans, and soil conservation and flood control projects. The latter two were of special concern in Cannon's district, and one of the congressman's most enduring legacies involved securing federal funding for what eventually became the Clarence Cannon Dam and Reservoir in northeastern Missouri. Cannon also played a major role in the establishment of the rural electrification program and in obtaining government funds for agricultural research. "No farm legislation was approved by Congress during the Cannon years," a contemporary observer noted, "that did not bear the impress of Cannon's knowledge of parliamentary procedure and his influence in Congress."

With the notable exception of farm supports, the Missourian primarily gained a reputation as a budget-slashing fiscal conservative, especially after he became chair of the House Appropriations Committee in 1941. Cannon retained this powerful position, except for four years of Republican control, until his death. He urged a quick reduction in military expenditures immediately after World War II, denounced foreign aid as waste, and ridiculed the space program as "moondoggle" (the word had been coined by Norbert Wiener). Cannon's desire to hold tight the nation's purse strings grew with the years. In 1962, he bitterly denounced the first "$100-billion Congress" in a much-publicized speech on the House floor, angering House Speaker John W. McCormack and other fellow Democrats.

Always outspoken, sometimes irascible, Cannon earned a reputation for pugnacity. He once lampooned a fellow House member, "Of all the 'piddlin' politicians that ever piddled 'piddlin' politics on this floor, my esteemed friend, the gentleman from Wisconsin, is the greatest piddler that ever piddled." During an argument in 1945, Cannon punched in the face Representative John Taber of New York, the ranking Republican member of the House Appropriations Committee. Cannon noted gleefully that Taber ran out of the room with a bleeding lip. In 1962, Cannon engaged in an unseemly and well-publicized dispute with U.S. Senator Carl Hayden of Arizona, another octogenarian Democrat, over obscure matters of parliamentary precedent.

Cannon did not sign the 1956 Southern Manifesto, and voted in favor of the Civil Rights Acts of 1957, 1960, and 1964, but voted present on the 24th Amendment to the U.S. Constitution.

Cannon's irascibility extended beyond the halls of Congress. In January 1964, Jacqueline Kennedy wrote to him expressing her appreciation for his help in establishing the John F. Kennedy Center for the Performing Arts, adding, "I know the fight was not easy." Cannon retorted to the recently widowed first lady: "You say the fight was not easy, but on the contrary, we had cooperation from everyone. It was done practically by acclamation."

== Death ==
Cannon died of heart failure at the Washington Hospital Center in Washington, D.C. He had already announced his intention to seek reelection later in the year. His lengthy service in Congress made him an influential if somewhat contradictory representative. During his 41-year congressional career, he served well his rural Missouri constituents, securing passage of farm supports and funding for local projects that some critics denounced as "pork barrel" politics. At the same time, he advocated stricter fiscal responsibility in other branches of the federal government. Beyond the scope of legislation, Cannon's publications on congressional procedure have achieved the status of holy writ for successive generations of lawmakers. His contributions to agricultural and appropriation policies and parliamentary procedure, enhanced by his colorful personality, have ensured him a place as one of the major congressional figures of the twentieth century.

== Legacy ==
Cannon was the author of A Synopsis of the Procedure of the House (1918), Procedure in the House of Representatives (1920), and Cannon’s Procedure (1928), subsequent editions of the latter being published periodically by resolutions of the House until 1963. He was the editor and compiler of Precedents of the House of Representatives (Cannon's Precedents) by an act of Congress. He also served as regent of the Smithsonian Institution from 1935 to 1964. He is interred in Elsberry City Cemetery, Elsberry, Missouri. The Clarence Cannon Dam, in Ralls County, Missouri, creating Mark Twain Lake, is named in his honor due to his involvement in securing funding for the dam's construction. For several years the airport in Kirksville, Missouri was known as Clarence Cannon Memorial Airport. However, in the 1980s the name was changed to Kirksville Regional Airport. The terminal is still known as the Clarence Cannon terminal in honor of his role in securing and maintaining commercial air service to Kirksville. A high school athletic conference that serves much of his former district is known as the Clarence Cannon Conference. A National Wildlife Refuge near Annada, Missouri also bears his name: the Clarence Cannon National Wildlife Refuge.

== See also ==
- List of members of the United States Congress who died in office (1950–1999)

U.S. House of Representatives
Preceded by Theodore W. Hukriede	Member of the U.S. House of Representatives from Missouri's 9th congressional district March 4, 1923 – May 12, 1964	Succeeded by William L. Hungate
Preceded by Edward T. Taylor	Chairman of the U.S. House Committee on Appropriations; January 3, 1941 – January 3, 1947	Succeeded by John Taber
Preceded by John Taber	Chairman of the U.S. House Committee on Appropriations; January 3, 1949 – January 3, 1953	Succeeded by John Taber
Preceded by John Taber	Chairman of the U.S. House Committee on Appropriations; January 3, 1955 – May 12, 1964	Succeeded by George H. Mahon
Honorary titles
Preceded by Thomas J. O'Brien	Oldest member of the U.S. House of Representatives; 1964–1964	Succeeded by Barratt O'Hara
