= Theodore W. Hukriede =

American politician

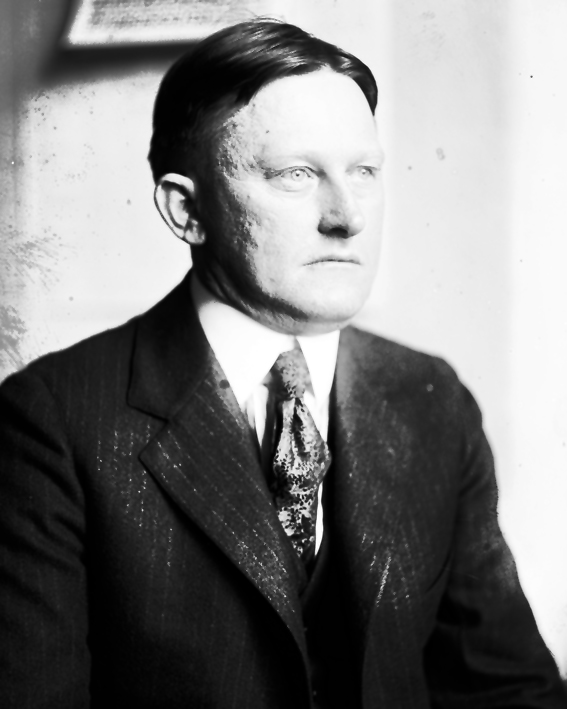

Member of the Missouri House of Representatives from Warren County
- In office January 6, 1943 – April 14, 1945
- Preceded by: Harry B. McGee
- Succeeded by: Elroy Kehr

Member of the U.S. House of Representatives from Missouri's 9th district
- In office March 4, 1921 – March 3, 1923
- Preceded by: Champ Clark
- Succeeded by: Clarence Cannon

Personal details
- Born: November 9, 1878 near New Truxton, Missouri
- Died: April 14, 1945 (aged 66) Warrenton, Missouri
- Party: Republican
- Education: Central Wesleyan College; University of Missouri
- Occupation: Lawyer

Theodore Waldemar Hukriede (November 9, 1878 – April 14, 1945) was a U.S. representative from Missouri.

Born near New Truxton, Missouri, Hukriede attended the public schools, Central Wesleyan College, Warrenton, Missouri, and the University of Missouri, where he studied law. Admitted to the bar in 1903, he commenced practice in Warrenton, Missouri, that same year.

Hukriede was elected prosecuting attorney of Warren County in 1904, 1906, and 1908; and served probate judge of Warren County from 1910-1920.

A Republican, he served as a delegate to the Missouri State conventions in 1900, 1908, 1912, 1916, 1936, and 1940; and as a delegate to the Republican National Conventions in 1916 and 1936. He also served as president of the Warrenton School Board from 1916 to 1920, and as chairman of the Republican State committee from 1916 to 1918.

Hukriede was elected as a Republican to the Sixty-seventh Congress (March 4, 1921 – March 3, 1923). He was an unsuccessful candidate for reelection in 1922 to the Sixty-eighth Congress. He was appointed United States Marshal for the eastern district of Missouri on May 12, 1923, and served until March 1933. He resumed the practice of law afterward.

Hukriede was elected to the State house of representatives in 1942. He was reelected in 1944 and served until his death in Warrenton, Missouri, on April 14, 1945. He was interred in Warrenton Memorial Society Cemetery.

U.S. House of Representatives
Preceded by Champ Clark	Member of the U.S. House of Representatives from Missouri's 9th congressional district 1921–1923	Succeeded by Clarence Cannon
