= Ford City =

Ford City may refer to:

== Canada ==
- Ford City, Ontario

== United States ==
- Ford City, California
- Ford City, Missouri
- Ford City, Pennsylvania
- West Lawn, Chicago#Ford City
  - Ford City Mall
