= David Rea =

David Rea may refer to:

- David Rea (politician) (1831–1901), American politician
- David Rea (musician) (1946–2011), American folk musician
