= 1884 Missouri State Auditor election =

- November 4, 1884
Nominee	John Walker
Party	Democratic
Popular vote	Unknown
Percentage	100.00%
State Auditor before election
John Walker
Democratic
Elected State Auditor
John Walker
Democratic

The 1884 Missouri State Auditor election was held on November 4, 1884, in order to elect the state auditor of Missouri. Democratic nominee and incumbent state auditor John Walker won re-election as he ran unopposed. The exact results of this election are unknown.

== General election ==
On election day, November 4, 1884, Democratic nominee John Walker won re-election as he ran unopposed, thereby retaining Democratic control over the office of state auditor. Walker was sworn in for his second term on January 12, 1885.

=== Results ===
Missouri State Auditor election, 1884
Party	Candidate	Votes	%
Democratic	John Walker (incumbent)	Unknown	100.00
Total votes		Unknown	100.00
Democratic hold			

== See also ==
- 1884 Missouri gubernatorial election
