= Champ, Audrain County, Missouri =

Unincorporated community in Missouri, United States

Coordinates: 39°07′14″N 91°55′47″W

Champ is an unincorporated community in Audrain County, in the U.S. state of Missouri.

== History ==
A post office called Champ was established in 1894, and remained in operation until 1901. The community was named after Champ Clark, a state legislator.
