= James Dunlavy =

American civil war soldier

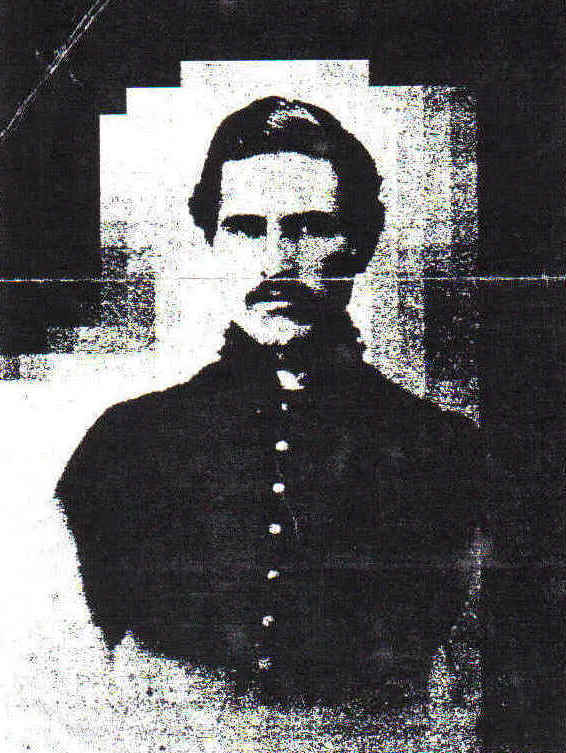
- Born: February 4, 1844; Decatur County, Indiana, U.S.
- Died: March 6, 1923 (aged 79); Enid, Oklahoma, U.S.
- Military career
- Allegiance: United States
- Branch: Union Army
- Service years: 1864–1865
- Rank: Private
- Unit: 3rd Iowa Cavalry Regiment
- Conflict: American Civil War
- Awards: Medal of Honor

James Dunlavy (February 4, 1844 – March 6, 1923) was an American soldier who fought for the Union Army in the American Civil War. Dunlavy received the Medal of Honor for capturing Confederate Major General John Sappington Marmaduke at the Battle of Mine Creek on October 25, 1864.

== Biography ==
Dunlavy was born the first of two children in Decatur County, Indiana, on February 4, 1844, to Harvey Howard Dunlavy (1817–1875) and Martha Ann Armour Rose Dunlavy (1822–1878).

He joined the 3rd Iowa Cavalry Regiment in November 1863. Though he still had eight months to serve when he captured Confederate Major General John S. Marmaduke on October 25, 1864, he was given a furlough as a reward for the remainder of his service commitment. He received his Medal of Honor on April 4, 1865. He was mustered out with his regiment in August 1865. After the Civil War, he became a doctor.

Dunlavy died on March 6, 1923; his remains are interred at the Independent Order of Odd Fellows Cemetery in Maramec, Oklahoma.

== Medal of Honor citation ==
Gallantry in capturing Gen. Marmaduke.

== See also ==
- List of American Civil War Medal of Honor recipients: A–F
