= Harold Volkmer =

American politician

Harold L. Volkmer
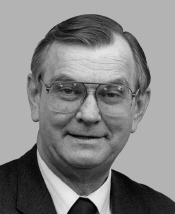

Member of the U.S. House of Representatives from Missouri's 9th district
- In office January 3, 1977 – January 3, 1997
- Preceded by: William L. Hungate
- Succeeded by: Kenny Hulshof

Member of the Missouri House of Representatives
- In office 1967–1977

Personal details
- Born: April 4, 1931 Jefferson City, Missouri, U.S.
- Died: April 16, 2011 (aged 80) Hannibal, Missouri, U.S.
- Party: Democratic
- Spouses: Shirley Ruth Braskett (m. 1955; died 1995) Dian Poole Sprenger (m. 1997)
- Children: 3, including John Paul and Elizabeth Ann
- Education: Saint Louis University; University of Missouri School of Law

Harold Lee Volkmer (April 4, 1931 – April 16, 2011) was an American politician from Missouri. He was a Democrat who served 20 years in the United States House of Representatives.

== Early life and career ==
Volkmer grew up in Jefferson City, Missouri, where he "got his start in politics helping his mother campaign in Jefferson City, Missouri, for the re-election of President Franklin Roosevelt." He attended Jefferson City Junior College and Saint Louis University. He later received his law degree from the University of Missouri, and passed the bar exam even before graduating. He married the former Shirley Ruth Braskett (died in 1995) in 1955, and they became the parents of two sons and a daughter. Volkmer served in the United States Army from 1955 to 1957.

Prior to entering politics, Volkmer operated a private law practice in Hannibal, Missouri.

== Political career ==
After graduating from law school, "Volkmer quickly entered public service, first as an Assistant Attorney General for the State, and then in the United States Army. He was elected Prosecuting Attorney for Marion County in 1960, and then State Representative in 1966." Volkmer was re-elected to the Missouri House of Representatives four times. "During his ten years in the Missouri legislature, he earned the same reputation that he would have had in Congress. An 'energetic blunt-talking lawyer' and 'a maverick,' in the words of the St. Louis Post-Dispatch. Volkmer led the way on a major reorganization of the executive branch of state government. As the Republican minority leader later recalled, 'Volkmer was the brains for all of us. He understood the issue of reorganization better than anybody in the Legislature. We all looked to him for leadership, including me. I don’t like to say that, darn it, because he’s a Democrat. But it’s true.'"

As Chairman of the Missouri House Judiciary Committee, Volkmer sought and obtained approval of the Equal Rights Amendment by the Missouri House of Representatives. In 1976, he was elected to the United States House of Representatives and was re-elected nine times.

In Congress, Volkmer represented a mostly rural 21-county area in northeastern Missouri. He served on the House Agriculture Committee and helped shape five major farm bills. Volkmer also served for several of his early terms on the House Judiciary Committee. He had a reputation as a conservative Democrat due to his opposition to gun control legislation, his opposition to abortion, and his opposition to gay rights. However, these highly salient political issues overshadowed Volkmer's more progressive stances on many issues involving civil rights, environmental laws, and education policy. For instance, he supported the extension of the Voting Rights Act in 1982, the extension and expansion of the Fair Housing Act in 1988, expansion and strengthening of various environmental laws including Superfund, the Clean Water Act, and the Clean Air Act, and opposed certain Pentagon weapons programs considered by him to be wasteful and unnecessary. Volkmer also supported the Panama Canal Treaty Enabling Legislation in 1978, and the modernization of the United States Bankruptcy laws in 1978. Volkmer also supported the creation of the U.S. Department of Education.

He was one of the primary sponsors of the 1986 McClure-Volkmer Act that came to be known as the Firearm Owners Protection Act. This act amended the Gun Control Act by creating an expanded system of rules and procedures with respect to compliance inspections of gun shops. According to legal scholar Dave Kopel, "Line by line, FOPA significantly strengthened statutory protections of the Second, Fourth, Fifth, Ninth, and Tenth Amendments. FOPA remains one of the most far-reaching laws ever enacted by Congress to safeguard constitutional rights."

For most of his tenure, Volkmer usually skated to reelection. From 1978 to 1990, he only faced one close race, in 1984. In 1992, however, he was nearly defeated by Republican Rick Hardy, a political science professor at MU, surviving by only 5,800 votes. He faced an equally close race in 1994, when Republican assistant attorney general Kenny Hulshof held him to 50.4 percent of the vote. He lost a rematch to Hulshof in 1996 by just under 5,900 votes. Since then, the Democrats have only once cracked the 40 percent barrier in the district, now numbered as the 3rd.

After leaving Congress, Volkmer served as chairman of the National Commission on Small Farms, and "the members of the National Rifle Association overwhelmingly elected him to their Board of Directors, on which he served for the next 12 years." Volkmer resided in Hannibal, Missouri until his death at age 80 from pneumonia on April 16, 2011.

U.S. House of Representatives
Preceded by William L. Hungate	Member of the U.S. House of Representatives from Missouri's 9th congressional district 1977–1997	Succeeded by Kenny Hulshof
