= Clark National Forest =

Former national forest in Missouri, U.S.

Coordinates: 37.70°N 92.10°W

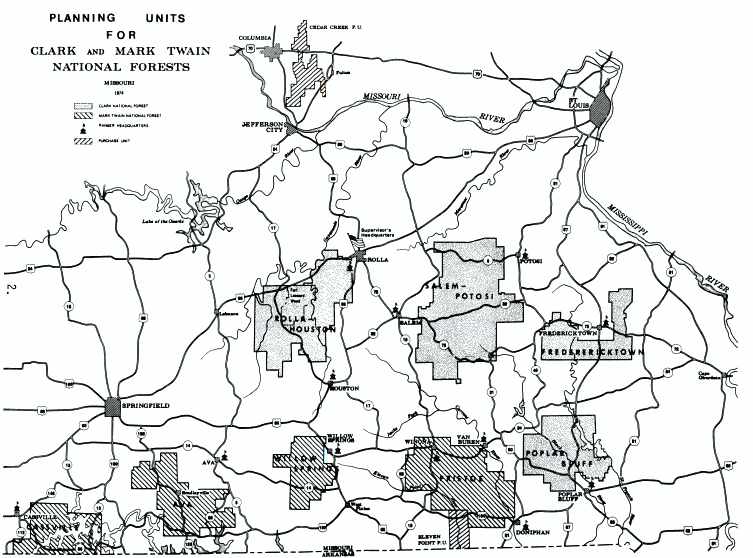
Map of National Forests in Missouri in 1974. Clark National Forest planning units are the dotted areas (Rolla-Houston, Salem-Potosi, Fredericktown, Poplar Bluff in this map, Cedar Creek not shown on this map).

Clark National Forest was a National Forest in Missouri established on September 11, 1939 with 1,971,885 acres (7,979.9 km^{2}). On July 1, 1973 it was administratively combined with Mark Twain National Forest, and on February 17, 1976 it was absorbed by Mark Twain.

The forest was named after Champ Clark, a state legislator.
