= William M. Treloar =

American politician (1850–1935)

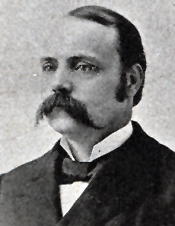
- Treloar in 1896

Member of the U.S. House of Representatives from Missouri's 9th district
- In office March 4, 1895 – March 3, 1897
- Preceded by: Champ Clark
- Succeeded by: Champ Clark

Personal details
- Born: September 21, 1850 near Linden, Wisconsin
- Died: July 3, 1935 (aged 84) St. Louis, Missouri
- Resting place: Bellefontaine Cemetery; 38.69095°N 90.23494°W
- Party: Republican
- Education: Iowa Wesleyan University
- Occupation: Professor, composer, politician

William Mitchellson Treloar (September 21, 1850 – July 3, 1935) was an American music professor, composer, music publisher, and U.S. Representative from Missouri.

== Biography ==
Treloar was born near Linden, Wisconsin, and attended the local common schools. His family moved to Mount Pleasant, Iowa in 1864, and he attended its high school and then Iowa Wesleyan College. He moved to Missouri in 1872, where he began a career teaching music at Mount Pleasant College in Huntsville from 1872 to 1875. In 1875, he moved to Mexico, Missouri, where he became professor of music at Hardin College, and also taught at the Synodical Female College in nearby Fulton and in the local public schools.

Treloar first entered politics in 1894, serving as a delegate to the Republican state convention and running for Congress against Democratic Congressman Champ Clark, whom he beat during the year of a Republican landslide. Treloar was said to have been the fifth choice of the Republican Party to run for the seat and, upon winning was ridiculed by newspapers as a "banjo player" and "piano tuner." However, the defeated Clark graciously defended him, calling him a "man of fair capacity and good manners" and praising his academic and composing career. After serving a term in the 54th Congress, Treloar lost his 1896 bid for reelection in a rematch with Clark, this time during a year of Democratic gains.

During his short tenure, he sponsored the Treloar Copyright Bill that would have created a copyright registry and extended copyright terms. The bill was quite controversial, and the subject of extensive lobbying efforts from both supporters and opponents. Although it did not make it out of committee, some of its provisions did later pass.

Upon leaving the House, he became postmaster of Mexico, Missouri from 1898 to 1904. In 1905, he moved to Kansas City, Missouri to start a music publishing business. He ran the business in Kansas City from 1905 through 1915, after which he moved it to St. Louis. There, he also taught and composed music, and served as an election judge from 1920 through 1924. He died in St. Louis, and is buried in Bellefontaine Cemetery.

The town of Treloar, Missouri is named for him.

U.S. House of Representatives
Preceded by Champ Clark	Member of the U.S. House of Representatives from Missouri's 9th congressional district 1895–1897	Succeeded by Champ Clark
