= James Broadhead =

American politician (1819–1898)

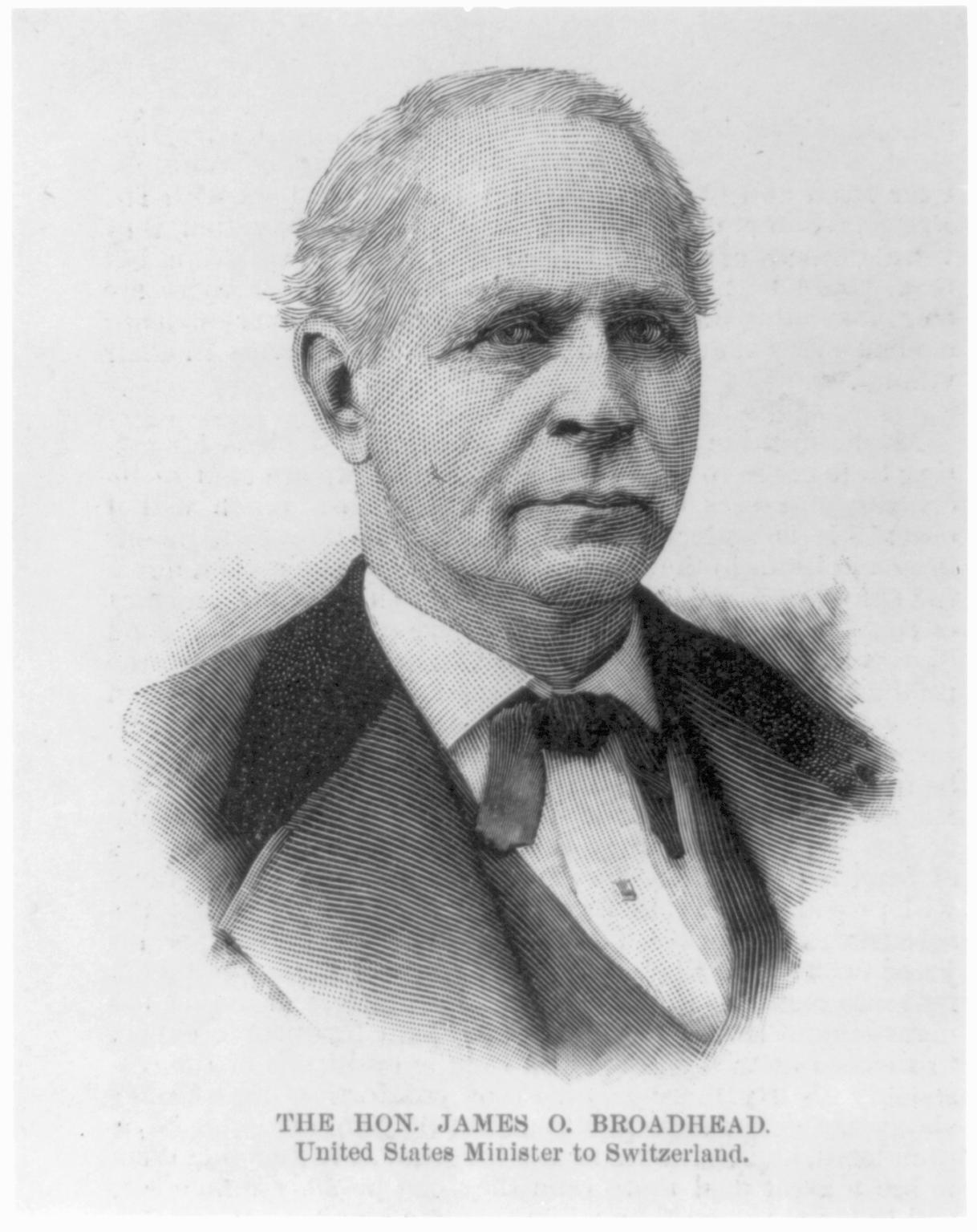

United States Ambassador to Switzerland
- In office July 5, 1893 – November 1, 1895
- President: Grover Cleveland
- Preceded by: Person Cheney
- Succeeded by: John Peak

Member of the U.S. House of Representatives from Missouri's 9th district
- In office March 4, 1883 – March 3, 1885
- Preceded by: Nicholas Ford
- Succeeded by: John M. Glover

Personal details
- Born: James Overton Broadhead; May 29, 1819 Charlottesville, Virginia, U.S.
- Died: August 7, 1898 (aged 79) St. Louis, Missouri, U.S.
- Party: Democratic
- Education: University of Virginia

James Overton Broadhead (May 29, 1819 – August 7, 1898) was an American lawyer and politician. He was a member of the House of Representatives and of the Missouri Senate. He was also the first president of the American Bar Association.

== Biography ==
Broadhead was born in Charlottesville, Virginia, and studied law at St. Louis, Missouri, after a one-year stay in the University of Virginia. Having received his license, Broadhead began a private practice in 1842 at Bowling Green, Missouri. Joining the Missouri Constitutional Convention in 1845, it a year later that he participated in the Missouri House of Representatives. From 1850 until 1853 he also served in the Missouri Senate before returning to private practice as a partner in a law firm back in St Louis.

He formed the Committee of Safety to oppose the growing southern factions in the lead up to the American Civil War and was a member of the Missouri Constitutional Convention that declared Missouri's loyalty to the Union in 1861. Broadhead was commissioned as a lieutenant-colonel in the 3rd Missouri cavalry and assigned to General Schofield, and was also served as an advisor for the preliminary constitution which dictated the government of Missouri during the Civil War. Attending the Missouri State Constitutional Convention in 1875, Broadhead worked closely on the Whisky Ring bribery cases in 1876. In 1878 he was chosen as the president of the new American Bar Association. Between 1883 and 1885 Broadhead represented Missouri in the House of Representatives as a Democrat, as well as being a member of the Judiciary Committee, as special commissioner to France and later minister to Switzerland in 1885 and 1893 until 1897. Resuming private practice, Broadhead returned to St Louis, where he died in 1898.

During his campaign for Congress in 1882, the St. Louis Post-Dispatch began running articles critical of Broadhead at the direction of John Cockerill, the managing editor. Col. Alonzo W. Slayback, a close friend and law partner of Broadhead, stormed into Cockerill's offices, demanding that Cockerill apologize. Cockerill shot and killed Slayback, claiming self-defense, and a grand jury refused to indict him.

U.S. House of Representatives
Preceded by Nicholas Ford	Member of the U.S. House of Representatives from Missouri's 9th congressional district 1883–1885	Succeeded by John M. Glover
Diplomatic posts
Preceded by Person Cheney	United States Ambassador to Switzerland; 1893–1895	Succeeded by John Peak
