= Nathan Frank =

American politician (1852–1931)

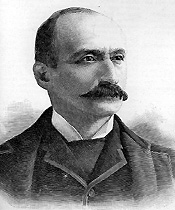
- Frank c. 1891

Member of the U.S. House of Representatives from Missouri's 9th district
- In office March 4, 1889 – March 3, 1891
- Preceded by: John Milton Glover
- Succeeded by: Seth W. Cobb

Personal details
- Born: February 23, 1852 Peoria, Illinois, U.S.
- Died: April 5, 1931 (aged 79) St. Louis, Missouri, U.S.
- Resting place: Mount Sinai Cemetery
- Party: Republican
- Education: Harvard University
- Occupation: Politician, lawyer

Nathan Frank (February 23, 1852 – April 5, 1931) was a U.S. representative from Missouri.

Born in Peoria, Illinois, Frank attended the public schools of Peoria and St. Louis and Washington University in St. Louis. He graduated from Harvard Law School in 1871. He was admitted to the bar and commenced practice in St. Louis in 1872. He unsuccessfully contested the election of John M. Glover to the Fiftieth Congress in 1886.

Frank was elected as a Republican to the Fifty-first Congress (March 4, 1889 – March 3, 1891). He declined to be a candidate for renomination in 1890. Founder and owner of the St. Louis Star. He served as delegate to the Republican National Convention in 1896. He served as vice president of the Louisiana Purchase Exposition at St. Louis in 1904. He was an unsuccessful candidate for nomination for United States Senator in 1910, 1916, and 1928. He retired from the active practice of law. He died at St. Louis, Missouri, April 5, 1931. He was interred in Mount Sinai Cemetery. His memory is enshrined by the Nathan Frank Memorial Bandstand in Forest Park, St. Louis.

Frank was Missouri's first Jewish congressman.

== See also ==
- List of Jewish members of the United States Congress

U.S. House of Representatives
Preceded by John M. Glover	Member of the U.S. House of Representatives from Missouri's 9th congressional district March 4, 1889 – March 3, 1891	Succeeded by Seth W. Cobb
