= John Milton Glover =

American politician (1852–1929)

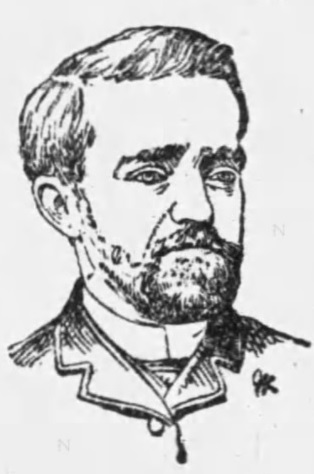
- St. Louis Globe-Democrat, February 22, 1887

Member of the United States House of Representatives
- In office March 4, 1885 – March 3, 1889
- Preceded by: James Broadhead
- Succeeded by: Nathan Frank
- Constituency: Missouri's 9th congressional district

Personal details
- Born: June 23, 1852 St. Louis, Missouri, U.S.
- Died: October 20, 1929 (aged 77) Pueblo, Colorado, U.S.
- Resting place: Bellefontaine Cemetery, St. Louis, Missouri, U.S.
- Party: Democratic
- Spouse: Katherine Augusta Patten (m. 1887)
- Children: 2
- Relatives: John Montgomery Glover (uncle)
- Education: Washington University in St. Louis (Attended)
- Profession: Attorney

John Milton Glover (June 23, 1852 – October 20, 1929) was a U.S. representative from Missouri, nephew of John Montgomery Glover.

== Early life ==
Glover was born in St. Louis, Missouri on June 23, 1852, a son of Samuel Taylor Glover and Mildred Ann (Buckner) Glover. He attended the public schools of St. Louis and Washington University in St. Louis. While in college, Glover became a member of the Beta Theta Pi fraternity.

== Start of career ==
Glover studied law, was admitted to the bar, and commenced practice at the St. Louis firm of Glover and Shepley, in which his father was a partner. He also became involved in politics as a Democrat when he was elected in March 1881 to represent the 10th Ward on the St. Louis Democratic Committee. He did not regularly attend meetings or participate in committee activities, and he was removed from the position in November, 1881. In 1883, Glover was one of the defense counsel retained by Frank James, who was tried for in Gallatin, Missouri for an 1881 robbery and murder; the trial ended with James's acquittal.

== Member of Congress ==
In 1884, Glover was elected as a Democrat to the 49th Congress. He was reelected to the 50th Congress in 1886, and served from March 4, 1885 to March 3, 1889. During his House service, Glover was a member of the Judiciary Committee and Committee on Territories. In June 1887, the competition for an appointment to the United States Military Academy from Glover's district was won by William J. Glasgow; he retired as a brigadier general in 1927.

In 1887, Glover's 1886 reelection was contested by Nathan Frank, who narrowly lost the three-way race. Frank argued that legally cast ballots for him were disregarded by local election officials, and that illegal ballots for Glover were counted, thereby denying Frank a victory. The U.S. House Committee on Elections determined that Glover was entitled to the seat. Glover was not a candidate for re-nomination in 1888, and was an unsuccessful candidate for the Democratic nomination for governor of Missouri. Frank won the election to succeed Glover in Congress.

== Later life ==
Glover then returned to the practice of law in St. Louis, where he remained until 1909, when he moved to Denver, Colorado, and continued the practice of law. During the Colorado Labor Wars of 1903 and 1904, Glover sided with miners in the Cripple Creek area as they carried out labor strikes against the mine owners. When the state government imposed limitations on firearms in an attempt to stop violence, Glover publicly refused to comply. County sheriff's deputies and members of the state militia subsequently attempted to enter his office to disarm him; shots were exchanged, and Glover was wounded. He quickly recovered and continued to support the miners.

Glover retired due to ill health and loss of his mental faculties in 1926, and was committed to the state hospital in Pueblo, Colorado. He died in Pueblo on October 20, 1929. Glover was interred at Bellefontaine Cemetery in St. Louis.

== Family ==
In February 1887, Glover married Katherine Augusta Patten, one of five sisters who were heir to their late father Edmund's gold mining fortune, at her family's mansion in Washington, D.C. The society wedding was attended by Nevada Senator Charles Manderson, California Senator Leland Stanford, California Senator-elect George Hearst, New York Senator-elect Frank Hiscock and their wives. They were the parents of two children, son Edmund and daughter Gladys.

After the death of Katherine Patten Glover's mother Anastasia in September 1888, the Glovers began a prolonged legal battle with Mrs. Glover's sisters over her share of the inheritance. One of the outcomes was the 1897 United States Supreme Court ruling on Glover v. Patten which set the precedent that attorney–client privilege does not apply with respect to the deceased author of a will and his or her lawyer, on the grounds that disposition of the estate according to the deceased's wishes takes priority over confidential communications.

== Legacy ==
Glover is the namesake of the community of Glover, Missouri.

U.S. House of Representatives
Preceded by James Broadhead	Member of the U.S. House of Representatives from Missouri's 9th congressional district March 4, 1885 – March 3, 1889	Succeeded by Nathan Frank
