= Seth W. Cobb =

American politician (1838–1909)

Seth Wallace Cobb
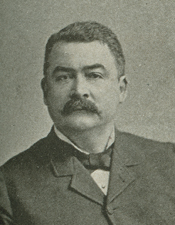
- 1896 Congressional portrait

Member of the U.S. House of Representatives from Missouri
- In office March 4, 1891 – March 3, 1897
- Preceded by: Nathan Frank
- Succeeded by: Charles Edward Pearce
- Constituency: 9th district (1891–1893); 12th district (1893–1897)

Personal details
- Born: December 5, 1838 Southampton County, Virginia, US
- Died: May 22, 1909 (aged 70) St. Louis, Missouri, US
- Resting place: Calvary Cemetery; St. Louis, Missouri
- Spouse: Zoe Cynthian Desloge
- Military career
- Allegiance: Confederate States of America
- Branch: Confederate States Army
- Service years: 1861-1865
- Rank: Brevet Major
- Units: Southampton Lee Artillery, 18th Battalion, Virginia Heavy Artillery
- Conflicts: American Civil War

Seth Wallace Cobb (December 5, 1838 – May 22, 1909) was a U.S. representative from Missouri.

== Biography ==
Born near Petersburg, Virginia, Cobb attended the common schools. He joined a volunteer company from his native county in 1861 and served throughout the Civil War in the Army of Northern Virginia. After the war, he moved to St. Louis, Missouri in 1867 and was employed as a clerk in a grain commission house. By 1870, Cobb opened his own grain business. Active in the local business community, he served as president of the Merchants' Exchange in 1886, and as president of the corporation which built the Merchants' Bridge across the Mississippi River.

Seth Cobb was married to socialite Zoe Cynthian Desloge, daughter of Firmin Rene Desloge. The marriage produced one child, a daughter named Josephine.

Cobb was elected as a Democrat to the Fifty-second, Fifty-third, and Fifty-fourth Congresses (March 4, 1891 – March 3, 1897). He was not a candidate for renomination in 1896, and he resumed the grain commission business in St. Louis. In 1904, he served as vice president of the Louisiana Purchase Exposition at St. Louis.

Cobb died in St. Louis, Missouri, May 22, 1909.

== Notes ==
U.S. House of Representatives
Preceded by Nathan Frank	Member of the U.S. House of Representatives from Missouri's 9th congressional district March 4, 1891 – March 3, 1893	Succeeded by Champ Clark
Preceded by David A. De Armond	Member of the U.S. House of Representatives from Missouri's 12th congressional district March 4, 1893 – March 3, 1897	Succeeded by Charles E. Pearce
