= Fitz Henry Warren =

American politician

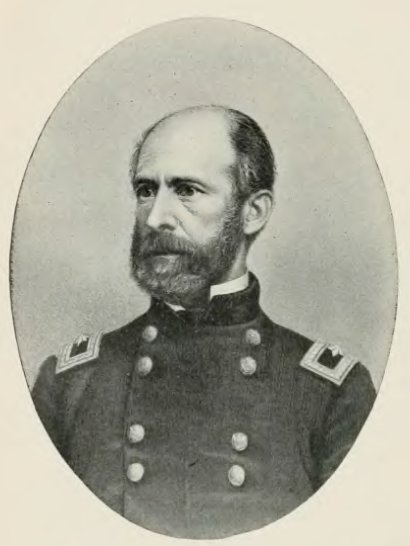
- Born: January 11, 1816; Brimfield, Massachusetts, U.S.
- Died: June 21, 1878 (aged 62); Brimfield, Massachusetts, U.S.
- Burial place: Brimfield Cemetery, Brimfield, Massachusetts
- Military career
- Allegiance: United States of America; Union
- Branch: United States Army; Union Army
- Rank: Brevet Major General
- Unit: 1st Regiment Iowa Volunteer Cavalry
- Conflicts: American Civil War

Fitz Henry Warren (January 11, 1816 – June 1878) was a politician and a Union Army general during the American Civil War.

== Early life and career ==
Warren was born in Brimfield, Massachusetts. In August 1844, he moved to Burlington in the Iowa Territory where he was a journalist and editorial contributor for The Hawk Eye. He was an early political activist in the Whig Party. He was reported to have been the first to propose the nomination of General Zachary Taylor for President. He was a delegate to the 1848 Whig National Convention.

Upon the subsequent inauguration of President Taylor in 1849, Fitz Henry Warren was appointed First Assistant Postmaster General. After the death of Taylor, Warren resigned his position in protest of President Millard Fillmore's support of the Fugitive Slave Law. With the growing support of Anti-Slavery Whigs, Fitz Henry Warren was made secretary of the Whig Party National Executive Committee.

Warren was chairman of the Des Moines County delegation to the convention of 1856 that organized the Republican Party and nominated John C. Frémont as the first Republican presidential candidate.

== Civil War ==
In 1861, he was one of the chief editorial writers on the New York Tribune and the author of the controversial "On to Richmond" articles after the First Battle of Bull Run.

He returned to Iowa following First Bull Run and, as Colonel, helped to raise the 1st Regiment Iowa Volunteer Cavalry. On July 18, 1862, President Abraham Lincoln appointed Warren to the grade of brigadier general of volunteers, to rank from July 16, 1862, with a command in the army in Missouri under Major General Samuel R. Curtis.

In 1863, General Warren was the leading candidate before the Republican State Convention for governor of Iowa, but by a combination of the supporters of other candidates, Warren was defeated. On February 21, 1866, President Andrew Johnson nominated Warren for appointment to the grade of brevet major general of volunteers, to rank from August 24, 1865, and the United States Senate confirmed the appointment on April 26, 1866. Warren was mustered out of the volunteers on August 24, 1865.

== Postwar career ==
In 1866, Warren was elected to the Iowa Senate. After serving one session, he was appointed by President Andrew Johnson as the United States Minister to Guatemala where he served two years, until 1869. He served as a presidential elector on the Democratic ticket in 1872.

He died at his native Brimfield, Massachusetts, June 21, 1878, and is buried in Brimfield Cemetery in Brimfield, Massachusetts.

== See also ==
- List of American Civil War generals (Union)

== Notes ==
Diplomatic posts
Preceded by Elisha Oscar Crosby	United States Minister to Guatemala; June 27, 1866–August 11, 1869	Succeeded by Silas A. Hudson
