= Kenny Hulshof =

American politician (born 1958)

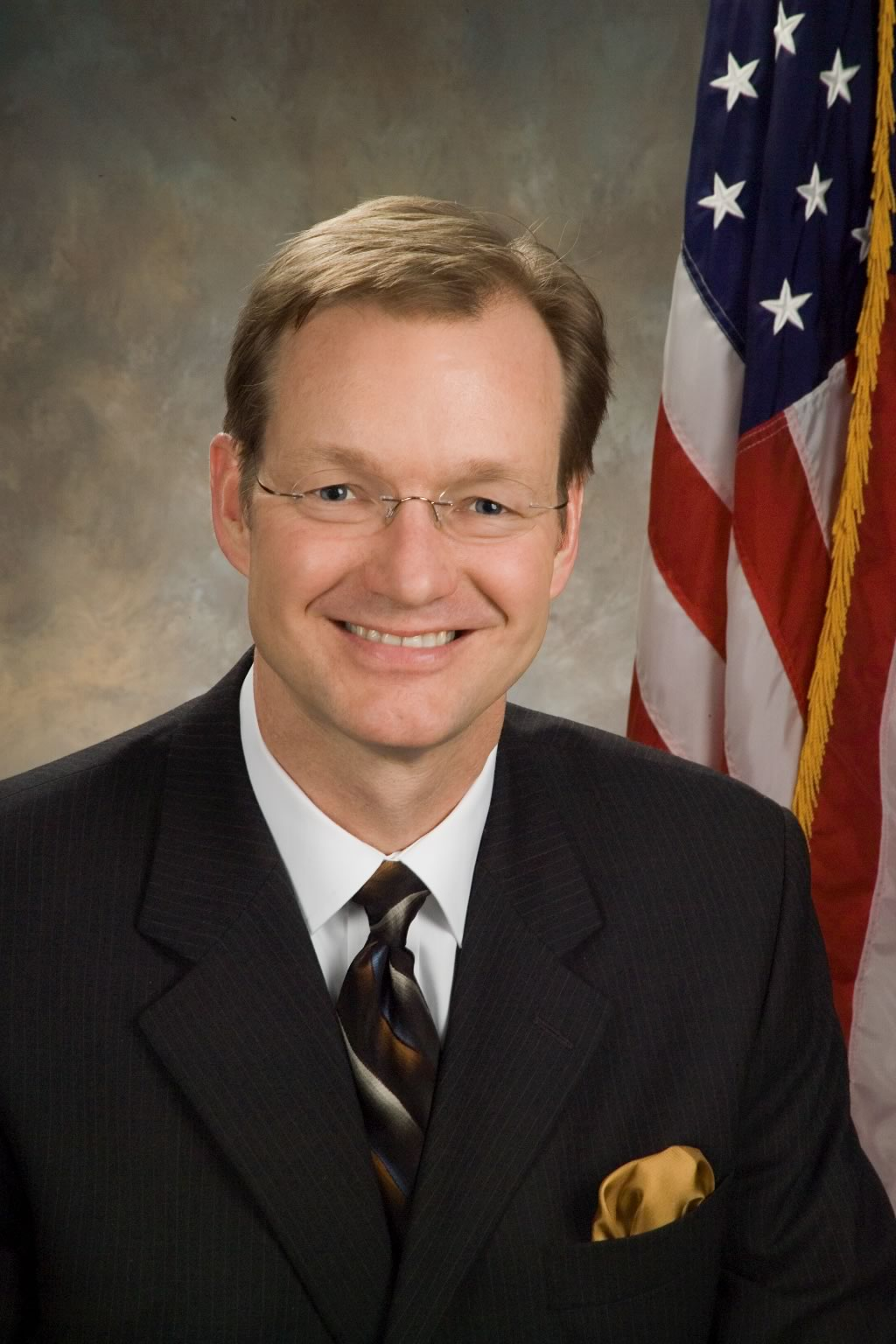

Member of the U.S. House of Representatives from Missouri's 9th district
- In office January 3, 1997 – January 3, 2009
- Preceded by: Harold Volkmer
- Succeeded by: Blaine Luetkemeyer

Personal details
- Born: Kenny Charles Hulshof; May 22, 1958 (age 68) Sikeston, Missouri, U.S.
- Party: Republican
- Spouse: Renee Hulshof
- Education: University of Missouri, Columbia (BS); University of Mississippi (JD)

Kenny Charles Hulshof (/ˈhʌlsɒf/; born May 22, 1958) is an American politician and lawyer who represented Missouri's 9th congressional district in the United States House of Representatives. He was the unsuccessful nominee of the Republican Party for Governor of Missouri in the 2008 election.

== Biography ==
Hulshof was born in Sikeston, Missouri, and is of Dutch, German, and Irish descent. Hulshof attended the University of Missouri and earned his J.D. from the University of Mississippi School of Law. Prior to serving in Congress, Hulshof worked in the public defender's office and as a special prosecutor for the Missouri attorney general's office. As a special prosecutor, Hulshof was detailed to capital cases. In 1992, Hulshof sought to be nominated by the Boone County Republican Committee as a replacement for Prosecuting Attorney Joe Moseley, who had won election to a legislative seat and had to resign to take his new post. Hulshof was defeated by Kevin Crane. In 1994, the Ninth District Republican Committee selected Hulshof to replace University of Missouri political science professor Rick Hardy as GOP candidate for Congress.

Despite a late start in the race, Hulshof captured 45% of the vote and nearly beat nine-term incumbent Democrat Harold Volkmer. The district had historically had a character similar to Yellow Dog Democrat districts in the South, but Volkmer was thought to be vulnerable after Hardy nearly unseated Volkmer in 1992 even as Bill Clinton easily carried the state.

Hulshof immediately began preparing to challenge Volkmer again in 1996. Hulshof had to first win the Republican primary against Harry Eggleston. Hulshof won the primary by 168 out of 38,000 votes cast. During the general election, Volkmer attacked Hulshof as being a puppet of Newt Gingrich; Hulshof responded that Volkmer voted twenty times to raise taxes in twenty years. Hulshof won the election by a 49%–47% margin, becoming only the third Republican to win it since 1893. He would never face another contest anywhere near that close, and was reelected five more times, never dropping below 59 percent of the vote. Hulshof made known his desire to run for Governor of Missouri in 2004, but withdrew in favor of then-Secretary of State Matt Blunt, who won.

Hulshof's voting record in the House was conservative. Among other issues, he voted against abortion and same-sex marriage, while supporting the death penalty and the Patriot Act.

Hulshof is Roman Catholic, and is active in the St. Thomas More Newman Center on the campus of his alma mater, the University of Missouri. In 2005, Hulshof joined the all-Congressional band the Second Amendments, to play for U.S. troops stationed overseas during the period between Christmas and New Year's Eve. Hulshof played the drums.

There had been rumors in Washington and back in Hulshof's district in Missouri that he might leave Congress to become the University of Missouri System president. Hulshof confirmed the rumors after his candidacy became common knowledge. However, the university's board of curators ended up voting to offer the position to another graduate, who declined the offer. The Board selected Gary D. Forsee for the President of the University of Missouri System in 2008.

When Governor Blunt announced he would not be seeking re-election in 2008, Hulshof announced on January 29 that he would run for governor. Hulshof defeated State Treasurer Sarah Steelman in the Missouri Republican Gubernatorial primary, held on August 5, 2008, winning with a margin of 49% to 45%, with Scott Long receiving 5% and Jen Seivers 1%. Hulshof was defeated by four term Missouri Attorney General Jay Nixon, the Democratic Nominee, in the general election held on November 4, 2008.

Hulshof now works as a lobbyist for Kit Bond Strategies, based in St. Louis, Missouri.

== Court cases ==
A 2008 Associated Press investigation found five cases where Hulshof was accused of prosecutorial misconduct, primarily withholding exculpatory evidence. At least two cases in which Hulshof served as prosecuting attorney have been overturned on judicial review and one case in which the judge set aside the conviction.

In the first case Hulshof prosecuted Joshua Keezer for murder. He tried the case without physical evidence, DNA, fingerprints, a murder weapon, or any eyewitnesses. Kezer was convicted and sentenced to 60 years in prison. Kezer was set free after a Cole County Circuit judge overturned the conviction. Hulshof publicly stated that he remained convinced of Keezer's guilt.

The second case, overturned by the Missouri Supreme Court in January, 2013, involved the 1990 murder of a Livingston County woman in her home near Chillicothe. Mark Woodworth of Chillicothe, then 16 years old, was convicted in the shooting death of 40-year-old Cathy Robertson as well as the wounding of her husband. Hulshof, at the time an assistant Missouri Attorney General, was brought in as a special prosecutor in the original trial. On June 4, 2011, Hulshof was questioned regarding evidence in the Woodworth case. A special master determined that a series of letters written between the original trial judge and various prosecutors was not offered to Woodworth's defense attorneys. The Missouri Supreme Court ruled that there was a violation of the Brady v. Maryland evidence rules and overturned the conviction. In spite of prosecutorial misconduct, the Missouri Bar did not publicly admonish or punish Hulshof for his conduct.

== Committee assignments ==
- House Ways and Means Committee
  - Subcommittee on Health
  - Subcommittee on Trade

== Electoral history ==
=== United States House of Representatives ===
Missouri's 9th congressional district: Results 1996–2006
Year	Democrat	Votes	Pct	Republican	Votes	Pct	3rd Party	Party	Votes	Pct
1996	Harold Volkmer (inc.)	117,685	47.0%	Kenny Hulshof	123,580	49.4%	Mitchell Moore	Libertarian	7,140	2.9%
1998	Linda Vogt	66,861	35.5%	Kenny Hulshof (inc.)	117,196	62.2%	Robert Hoffman	Libertarian	4,248	2.3%
2000	Steven R. Carroll	111,662	38.3%	Kenny Hulshof (inc.)	172,787	59.3%	Robert Hoffman	Libertarian	3,608	1.2%
2002	Donald M. Deichman	61,126	28.5%	Kenny Hulshof (inc.)	146,032	68.2%	Keith Brekhus	Green	4,262	2.0%
2004	Linda Jacobsen	101,343	33.8%	Kenny Hulshof (inc.)	193,429	64.6%	Tamara A. Millay	Libertarian	3,228	1.1%
2006	Duane N. Burghard	87,145	35.9%	Kenny Hulshof (inc.)	149,114	61.4%	Steve R. Headrick	Libertarian	3,925	1.6%

=== Governor ===
2008 Missouri gubernatorial election
Party	Candidate	Votes	%	±%
Democratic	Jay Nixon	1,680,611	58.40%	+10.55%
Republican	Kenny Hulshof	1,136,364	39.49%	−11.34%
Libertarian	Andrew Finkenstadt	31,850	1.11%	+0.21%
Constitution	Gregory Thompson	28,941	1.01%	+0.59%
Write-in		12	0.00%	—
Majority		544,247	18.91%	+15.93%
Turnout		2,877,778		
Democratic gain from Republican				

U.S. House of Representatives
Preceded by Harold Volkmer	Member of the U.S. House of Representatives from Missouri's 9th congressional district 1997–2009	Succeeded by Blaine Luetkemeyer
Party political offices
Preceded by Matt Blunt	Republican nominee for Governor of Missouri; 2008	Succeeded by Dave Spence
U.S. order of precedence (ceremonial)
Preceded by Alan Wheat as Former U.S. Representative	Order of precedence of the United States as Former U.S. Representative	Succeeded by Vicky Hartzler as Former U.S. Representative
