= Missouri's 9th congressional district =

Former U.S. House district in northeastern Missouri

Coordinates: 39°20′N 92°00′W

- Obsolete district
- Created: 1860; 1935
- Eliminated: 1930; 2010
- Years active: 1863–1933; 1935–2013

Missouri's 9th congressional district was a US congressional district, dissolved in 2013, that last encompassed rural Northeast Missouri, the area known as "Little Dixie," along with the larger towns of Columbia, Fulton, Kirksville and Union, Boone, Franklin, and a portion of St. Charles County comprise the highest voting centers of the mostly rural district. It was last represented by Republican Blaine Luetkemeyer.

Some of the most well-known representatives for the district were Speaker of the House Champ Clark; James Broadhead, the first president of the American Bar Association; Clarence Cannon, chairman of the House Appropriations Committee; Isaac C. Parker, a judge depicted in True Grit; James Sidney Rollins, known as the "Father of the University of Missouri"; and Kenny Hulshof, unsuccessful candidate to become Governor of Missouri.

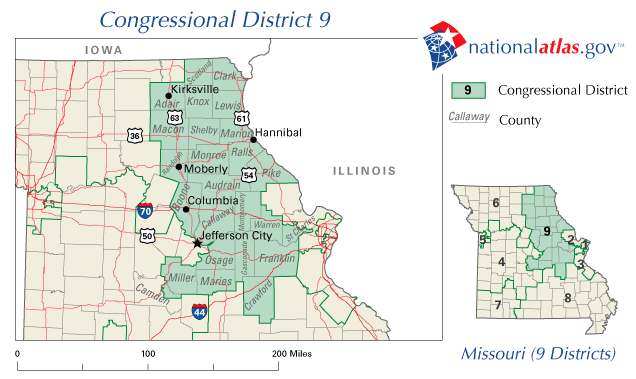
The district in its final form from 2003 to 2013

== Removal following the 2010 US census ==
The district no longer existed in 2013 after Missouri lost a congressional seat following the 2010 census. Initial redistricting maps placed most of the district north of the Missouri River in a redrawn 6th congressional district, and most of the rest of the district in a redrawn 3rd congressional district. The last congressman from the old 9th, Luetkemeyer was subsequently elected to the 3rd.

== Voting ==
George W. Bush defeated John Kerry 59% to 41% in this district in 2004. In 2008, Rep. Kenny Hulshof announced that he would seek the Republican nomination for Governor of Missouri. As a whole, the 9th district leaned towards the Republican Party, with the exception being Columbia, which often leaned towards the Democratic Party.

== List of members representing the district ==
Member	Party	Years	Cong ress	Electoral history
District created March 4, 1863
James S. Rollins (Columbia)	Union	March 4, 1863 – March 3, 1865	38th	Redistricted from the 2nd district and re-elected in 1862. Retired.
George W. Anderson (Louisiana)	Republican	March 4, 1865 – March 3, 1869	39th 40th	Elected in 1864. Re-elected in 1866. Retired.
David P. Dyer (Louisiana)	Republican	March 4, 1869 – March 3, 1871	41st	Elected in 1868. Lost re-election.
Andrew King (St. Charles)	Democratic	March 4, 1871 – March 3, 1873	42nd	Elected in 1870. Retired.
Isaac C. Parker (St. Joseph)	Republican	March 4, 1873 – March 3, 1875	43rd	Redistricted from the 7th district and re-elected in 1872. Retired.
David Rea (Savannah)	Democratic	March 4, 1875 – March 3, 1879	44th 45th	Elected in 1874. Re-elected in 1876. Lost re-election.
Nicholas Ford (Rochester)	Greenback	March 4, 1879 – March 3, 1883	46th 47th	Elected in 1878. Re-elected in 1880. Lost re-election.
James Broadhead (St. Louis)	Democratic	March 4, 1883 – March 3, 1885	48th	Elected in 1882. Retired.
John M. Glover (St. Louis)	Democratic	March 4, 1885 – March 3, 1889	49th 50th	Elected in 1884. Re-elected in 1886. Retired to run for governor.
Nathan Frank (St. Louis)	Republican	March 4, 1889 – March 3, 1891	51st	Elected in 1888. Retired.
Seth W. Cobb (St. Louis)	Democratic	March 4, 1891 – March 3, 1893	52nd	Elected in 1890. Redistricted to the 12th district.
Champ Clark (Bowling Green)	Democratic	March 4, 1893 – March 3, 1895	53rd	Elected in 1892. Lost re-election.
William M. Treloar (Mexico)	Republican	March 4, 1895 – March 3, 1897	54th	Elected in 1894. Lost re-election.
Champ Clark (Bowling Green)	Democratic	March 4, 1897 – March 2, 1921	55th 56th 57th 58th 59th 60th 61st 62nd 63rd 64th 65th 66th	Elected in 1896. Re-elected in 1898. Re-elected in 1900. Re-elected in 1902. Re-elected in 1904. Re-elected in 1906. Re-elected in 1908. Re-elected in 1910. Re-elected in 1912. Re-elected in 1914. Re-elected in 1916. Re-elected in 1918. Lost re-election and died before next term.
Vacant		March 2, 1921 – March 3, 1921	66th	
Theodore W. Hukriede (Warrenton)	Republican	March 4, 1921 – March 3, 1923	67th	Elected in 1920. Lost re-election.
Clarence Cannon (Elsberry)	Democratic	March 4, 1923 – March 3, 1933	68th 69th 70th 71st 72nd	Elected in 1922. Re-elected in 1924. Re-elected in 1926. Re-elected in 1928. Re-elected in 1930. Redistricted to the at-large district.
District inactive		March 4, 1933 – January 3, 1935	73rd	All representatives elected at-large.
Clarence Cannon (Elsberry)	Democratic	January 3, 1935 – May 12, 1964	74th 75th 76th 77th 78th 79th 80th 81st 82nd 83rd 84th 85th 86th 87th 88th	Redistricted from the at-large district and re-elected in 1934. Re-elected in 1936. Re-elected in 1938. Re-elected in 1940. Re-elected in 1942. Re-elected in 1944. Re-elected in 1946. Re-elected in 1948. Re-elected in 1950. Re-elected in 1952. Re-elected in 1954. Re-elected in 1956. Re-elected in 1958. Re-elected in 1960. Re-elected in 1962. Died.
Vacant		May 12, 1964 – November 3, 1964	88th	
William L. Hungate (Troy)	Democratic	November 3, 1964 – January 3, 1977	88th 89th 90th 91st 92nd 93rd 94th	Elected to finish Cannon's term. Re-elected in 1964. Re-elected in 1966. Re-elected in 1968. Re-elected in 1970. Re-elected in 1972. Re-elected in 1974. Retired.
Harold Volkmer (Hannibal)	Democratic	January 3, 1977 – January 3, 1997	95th 96th 97th 98th 99th 100th 101st 102nd 103rd 104th	Elected in 1976. Re-elected in 1978. Re-elected in 1980. Re-elected in 1982. Re-elected in 1984. Re-elected in 1986. Re-elected in 1988. Re-elected in 1990. Re-elected in 1992. Re-elected in 1994. Lost re-election.
Kenny Hulshof (Columbia)	Republican	January 3, 1997 – January 3, 2009	105th 106th 107th 108th 109th 110th	Elected in 1996. Re-elected in 1998. Re-elected in 2000. Re-elected in 2002. Re-elected in 2004. Re-elected in 2006. Retired to run for governor.
Blaine Luetkemeyer (St. Elizabeth)	Republican	January 3, 2009 – January 3, 2013	111th 112th	Elected in 2008. Re-elected in 2010. Redistricted to the 3rd district.
District eliminated January 3, 2013

== Election results ==
=== 1998 ===
1998 Missouri's 9th congressional election
Party	Candidate	Votes	%
Republican	Kenny Hulshof (incumbent)	117,196	62.2%
Democratic	Linda Vogt	66,861	35.5%
Libertarian	Robert Hoffman	4,248	2.3%
Total votes		188,305	100.0%
Republican hold			

=== 2000 ===
2000 Missouri's 9th congressional election
Party	Candidate	Votes	%
Republican	Kenny Hulshof (incumbent)	172,787	59.3%
Democratic	Steven R. Carroll	111,662	38.3%
Libertarian	Robert Hoffman	3,608	1.2%
Green	Devin M. Scherubel	2,388	0.8%
Reform	Steven D. Dotson	1,165	0.4%
Total votes		291,610	100.0%
Republican hold			

=== 2002 ===
2002 Missouri's 9th congressional election
Party	Candidate	Votes	%
Republican	Kenny Hulshof (incumbent)	146,032	68.2%
Democratic	Donald M. Deichman	61,126	28.5%
Green	Keith Brekhus	4,262	2.0%
Libertarian	John Mruzik	2,705	1.3%
Total votes		214,125	100.0%
Republican hold			

=== 2004 ===
2004 Missouri's 9th congressional election
Party	Candidate	Votes	%
Republican	Kenny Hulshof (incumbent)	193,429	64.6%
Democratic	Linda Jacobsen	101,343	33.8%
Libertarian	Tamara A. Millay	3,228	1.1%
Constitution	Chris Earl	1,447	0.5%
Total votes		299,447	100.0%
Republican hold			

=== 2006 ===
2006 Missouri's 9th congressional election
Party	Candidate	Votes	%
Republican	Kenny Hulshof (incumbent)	149,114	61.4%
Democratic	Duane N. Burghard	87,145	35.9%
Libertarian	Steve R. Headrick	3,925	1.6%
Progressive	Bill Hastings	2,487	1.0%
Total votes		242,671	100.0%
Republican hold			

=== 2008 ===
2008 Missouri's 9th congressional election
Party	Candidate	Votes	%
Republican	Blaine Luetkemeyer	161,031	50.0%
Democratic	Judy Baker	152,956	47.5%
Libertarian	Tamara Millay	8,108	2.5%
Total votes		322,095	100.0%
Republican hold			

=== 2010 ===
2010 Missouri's 9th congressional election
Party	Candidate	Votes	%
Republican	Blaine Luetkemeyer (incumbent)	162,724	77.4%
Libertarian	Christopher Dwyer	46,817	22.3%
Write-ins		817	0.3%
Total votes		210,358	100.0%
Republican hold			

U.S. House of Representatives
Preceded by Illinois's 18th congressional district	Home district of the speaker of the House; April 4, 1911 – March 4, 1919	Succeeded by Massachusetts's 2nd congressional district
