= Nicholas Ford =

American politician (1833–1897)

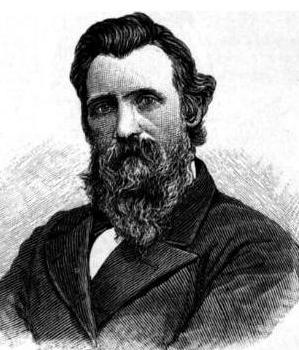

Member of the U.S. House of Representatives from Missouri's 9th district
- In office March 4, 1879 – March 3, 1883
- Preceded by: David Rea
- Succeeded by: James Broadhead

Personal details
- Born: June 21, 1833 Wicklow, Ireland
- Died: June 18, 1897 (aged 63) Miltonvale, Kansas, U.S.
- Resting place: Catholic Cemetery, Ford City, Missouri, U.S.
- Party: Republican
- Other political affiliations: Greenback
- Occupation: Politician

Nicholas Ford (June 21, 1833 – June 18, 1897) was a U.S. representative from Missouri.

Born in Wicklow, Ireland, Ford attended the village school and Maynooth College, Dublin, Ireland. Ford emigrated to the United States in 1848 with his parents, who settled in Chicago, Illinois. He moved to St. Joseph, Missouri, in 1859 and later to Colorado and Montana, states in which he engaged in mining. He returned to Missouri and settled in Rochester, Andrew County, and engaged in mercantile pursuits.

Ford was elected to the Missouri House of Representatives in 1875 as a Republican. Ford was elected as a Greenbacker (National Party) to the Forty-sixth and Forty-seventh Congresses (March 4, 1879 – March 3, 1883). He declined renomination to the Forty-eighth Congress in 1882. He was an unsuccessful Republican candidate for Governor of Missouri in 1884 and for election in 1890 to the Fifty-second Congress. He moved to Virginia City, Nevada, where he served as a member of the first city council. He retired from active business and moved to Miltonvale, Kansas, where he died on June 23, 1897. He was interred in the Catholic Cemetery, Aurora, Kansas.

Ford is the namesake of the community of Ford City, Missouri.

Party political offices
| Preceded by David Patterson Dyer | Republican nominee for Governor of Missouri; 1884 | Succeeded by Elbert Kimball |
U.S. House of Representatives
| Preceded by David Rea | Member of the U.S. House of Representatives from Missouri's 9th congressional district March 4, 1879 – March 3, 1883 | Succeeded by James Broadhead |
