= 3rd Missouri Cavalry Regiment (Union) =

- Flag of the United States (1863–1865)
- Active: 1861–1865
- Country: United States (Union)
- Allegiance: Missouri
- Branch: Volunteers
- Type: Cavalry
- Size: Regiment
- Battles: American Civil War; Battle of Bayou Fourche

Commanders
- Notable commanders: Col. John M. Glover

The 3rd Missouri Cavalry Regiment was a cavalry regiment that served in the Union Army during the American Civil War principally in Missouri and Arkansas.

== Timeline ==
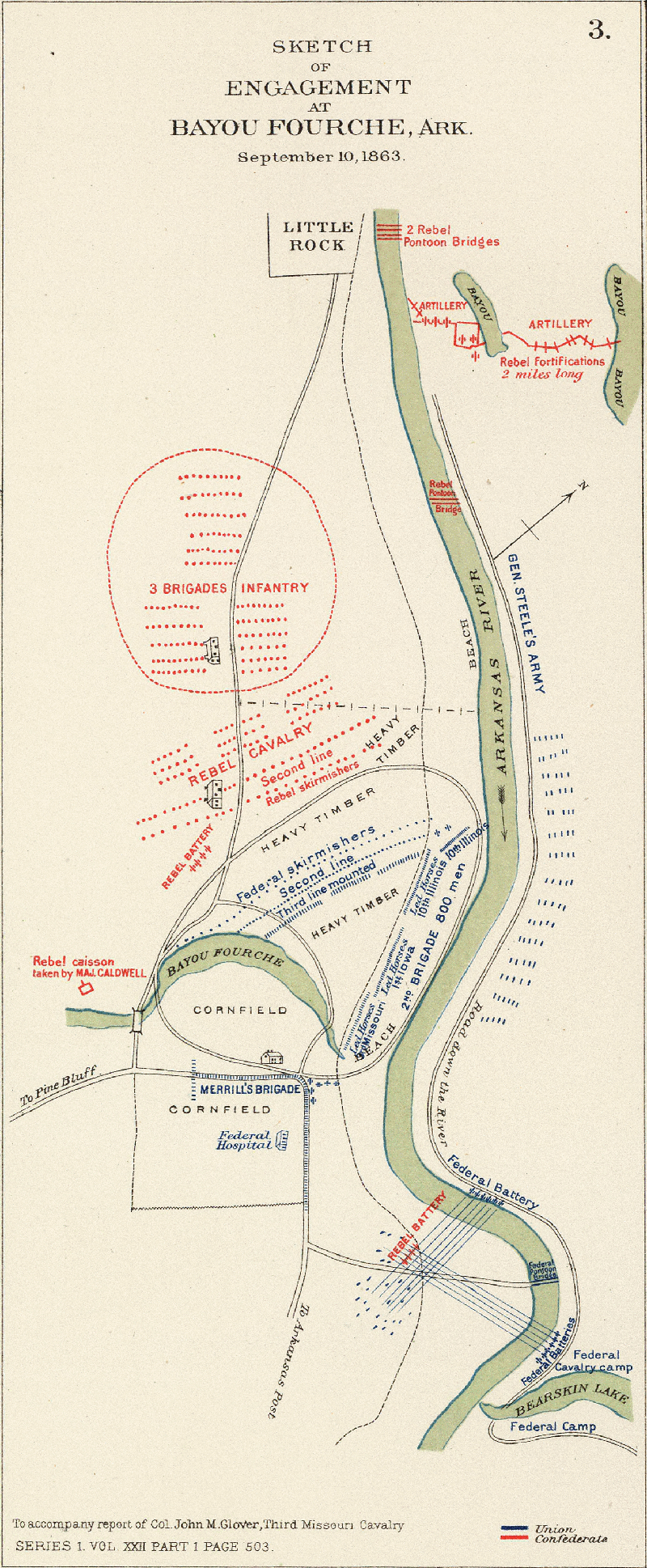
Sketch of Engagement at Bayou Fourche, Arkansas, September 10, 1863. To accompany report of Col. John M. Glover, Third Missouri Cavalry.

The 3rd Missouri Cavalry Regiment was recruited and organized at Palmyra, Missouri, under the lead of John M. Glover. Recruitment commenced on June 1, 1861.
- December 1861: Began its duty in Southeast Missouri and District of Rolla. Began under command of General Benjamin Prentiss and Colonel John McNeil. Action near Hallsville, Missouri
- December 27, 1861: Battle of Mount Zion Church
- December 28, 1861: Inman's Hollow
- July 7, 1862: (Companies B, D, G, H). Mountain Store, Big Piney
- July 25-2~, 1862: (Companies E, F). Scout and skirmish in Sinking Creek
- August 4–11, 1862: (Detachment) Salem
- August 9, 1862: Wayman's Mills and Spring Creek
- August 23, 1862: Scout from Salem to Current River
- August 24–28, 1862: (Company E). Beaver Creek, Texas County
- November 24, 1862: Expedition from Rolla to Ozark Mountains
- November 30-December 6, 1862: (Companies A, B) Ozark
- December 2, 1862: (Companies A, B) Wood's Creek
- January 11, 1863: Harteville, Wood's Fork
- January 11, 1863: Batesville, Arkansas
- February 4, 1863: Operations against Marmaduke
- April 17-May 2, 1863: Castor River, near Bloomfield
- April 29, 1863: Bloomfield
- April 30, 1863: Coal Bluff, St. Francis River,
- April 30-May 1, 1863: Advance upon Little Rock
- July 1-September 10, 1863: Moved from Wittsburg to Clarendon
- August 1–8, 1863: Near Bayou Metoe
- August 26, 1863: Bayou Meto (or Reed's Bridge)
- September 1–10, 1863: Bayou Fourche and capture of Little Rock
- September 10, 1863: Brownsville
- September 16, 1863: At Jacksonport, Arkansas
- November 1863 to March 1864. Affair at Jackeonport
- November 21, 1863: (Company E). Reconnoissance from Little Rock
- December 5–13, 1863: Jacksonport
- December 23, 1863: Scouts from Brownsville
- January 17–19, 1864: Hot Springs
- February 4, 1864: Steele's Expedition to Camden
- March 23-May 3, 1864: Elkins' Ferry, Little Missouri River,
- April 3–4, 1864: Mark's Mills
- April 5, 1864: Little Missouri River
- April 6, 1864: Prairie D'Ann
- April 9–12, 1864: Camden
- April 15–24, 1864: Mt. Elba Ferry
- April 26, 1864: Princeton
- April 29, 1864: Operations against Shelby north of Arkansas River,
- May 18–31, 1864: At Little Rock till June, 1865. Benton Road, near Little Rock,
- July 19, 1864: Benton
- July 25, 1864: (Company C). Scatterville
- July 28, 1864: (Detachment). Expedition from Little Rock to Little Red River
- August 6–16, 1864: At Tannery, near Little Rock
- September 2, 1864: (Detachment). Expedition from Little Rock to Fort Smith
- September 25-October 13, 1864: (Detachment). Reconnaissance from Little Rock toward Monticello and Mt. Elba
- October 4–11, 1864: Reconnaissance from Little Rock to Princeton
- October 19–23, 1864: Princeton
- October 23, 1864: Expedition from Little Rock to Saline River
- November 17–18, 1864: (Detachment). Expedition from Little Rock to Benton
- November 27–30, 1864: (Detachment).
Mustered out June 14, 1865: (Company "M" at Headquarters Department of Missouri, St. Louis, Missouri, November 1862 to June 1863.)

== Casualties ==
The regiment lost 3 Officers and 37 Enlisted men killed or mortally wounded, 1 Officer and 172 Enlisted men killed by disease. In total, 213 men were killed over the duration of service.

== Regimental Organization ==
=== Headquarters ===
The Commander of the Regiment was Colonel John M. Glover from August 5, 1861, through March 13, 1864.

=== Company A ===
- Commander: Captain James Howland
- Executive Officer: 1st Lieutenant B. Triplett

=== Company B ===
This company was formed from Missouri men from Marion and Knox Counties.

- Commander: Captain John Yates
- Executive Officer: 2nd Lieutenant James J. Agnew

=== Company C ===
Company C was mostly Illinois men. Company C sustained a greater percentage of losses as compared to the other companies of the Regiment.

- Commander: Captain Thomas G. Black

=== Company D ===
Company D was composed of equal numbers of Missouri and Illinois men.

- Commander: Captain John H. Reed

=== Company E ===
- Commander: Captain George D. Bradway
- Executive Officer: 1st Lieutenant Joseph Biggerstaff
- 2nd Lieutenant Nelson Young

=== Company F ===
- Commander: Captain James Call
- Executive Officer: 1st Lieutenant Francis Wilcox
- B Q Master: 1st Lieutenant James. C. Agnew

=== Company G ===
- Commander: Captain Willcox
- Executive Officer: 2nd Lieutenant George Felt

=== Company H ===
- Commander: Captain A. N. Graham
- Executive Officer: 1st Lieutenant S. Graham

=== Company I ===
- Commander: Captain John A. Lennon
- Captain Omer Kennen 3rd Regiment
- Executive Officer: 1st Lieutenant John Avery
- 2nd Lieutenant Alexander Lacy

== See also ==
- Missouri Civil War Union units
- Missouri in the Civil War
