= David Rea (politician) =

American politician and lawyer (1831–1901)

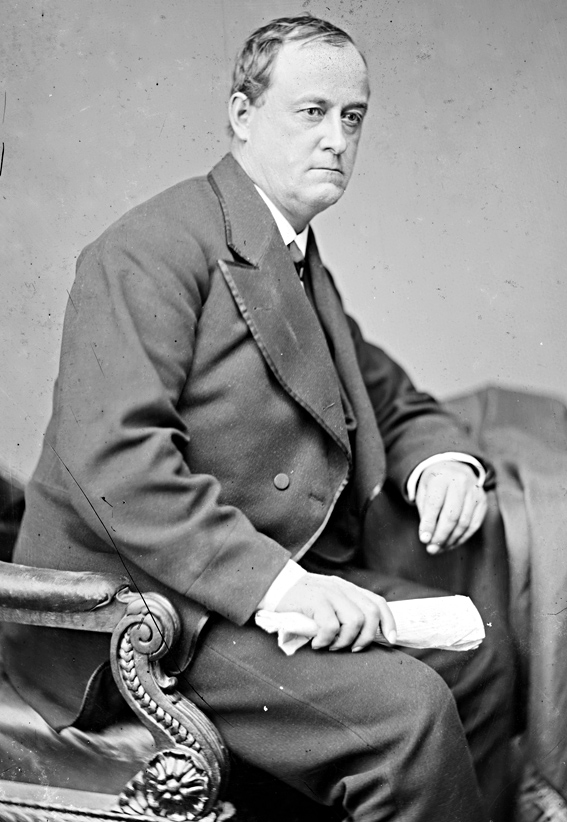
- Portrait of Rea by Mathew Brady, between 1865 and 1880

Member of the U.S. House of Representatives from Missouri's 9th district
- In office March 4, 1875 – March 3, 1879
- Preceded by: Isaac C. Parker
- Succeeded by: Nicholas Ford

Personal details
- Born: January 19, 1831 near New Marion, Indiana, US
- Died: June 13, 1901 (aged 70) Savannah, Missouri, US
- Party: Democratic
- Children: 6
- Profession: Politician, lawyer

Military service
- Allegiance: United States
- Branch/service: Union Army
- Rank: Lieutenant colonel
- Battles/wars: American Civil War

David Rea (January 19, 1831 – June 13, 1901) was an American politician and lawyer. A Democrat, he was a member of the United States House of Representatives from Missouri.

== Early life ==
Rea was born on January 19, 1831, near New Marion, Indiana. He was the oldest of ten children born to Johnathan Rea and Lurana (née Breaden) Rea. Of Scottish ancestry, he was also descendent of politician John Rea. Educated at common schools, he and his family moved to Andrew County, Missouri in 1842. He operated a farm near Rosendale and worked as an educator between 1849 and 1854.

== Career ==
Rea studied law and was admitted to the bar in 1862, and in 1863, commenced practice in Savannah. During the American Civil War, he served in the Union army. In the following order, he was a first lieutenant, captain, quartermaster, then lieutenant colonel. He returned to practicing law in Savannah after the war.

A Democrat, Rea served on the Andrew County School Board. He represented Missouri's 3rd congressional district in the United States House of Representatives, from March 4, 1875, to March 3, 1879. He lost his re-election. He was a member of the House Committees on Agriculture and on Energy and Commerce, during the 44th and 45th Congresses, respectively; he was also a member of the Committee on Mines and Mining. Politically, he was described as a conservative, then a liberal during the Reconstruction era. He was later a delegate to the 1896 Democratic National Convention.

After serving in Congress, Rea continued practicing law in Savannah.

== Personal life and death ==
In June 1852, Rea married Nancy E. Beattie, a relative of the Calhoun family. Together, they had four sons and two daughters. For the last five weeks of his life, he was diagnosed with diabetes. His right hallux being amputated, and was followed by the denied suggestion to amputate the leg up to the knee. He died on June 13, 1901, aged 70, in Savannah; he died from blood poisoning, caused by the diabetes, as well as from kidney disease. He was buried on June 13, at the City Cemetery, in Savannah.

U.S. House of Representatives
Preceded by Isaac C. Parker	Member of the U.S. House of Representatives from Missouri's 9th congressional district 1875–1879	Succeeded by Nicholas Ford
