= Ford City, Missouri =

Unincorporated community in Missouri, U.S.

Coordinates: 40°06′42″N 94°27′53″W

Ford City is an unincorporated community in Gentry County, in the U.S. state of Missouri.

== History ==
The community was named after Nicholas Ford, a U.S. Representative from Missouri. Variant names included: Ford, Millen, and Yolo. A post office called Ford was established in 1879; the name was changed to Ford City in 1893, and the post office closed in 1953.
