= New Truxton, Missouri =

Unincorporated community in the United States

Coordinates: 38°58′42″N 91°14′17″W

New Truxton is an unincorporated community in Warren County, in the U.S. state of Missouri.

== History ==
New Truxton was platted in 1904 when the railroad was extended to that point. A post office called New Truxton was established in 1905, and remained in operation until 1956. The name of the community was prefixed with "New" in order to avoid repetition with Truxton, in Lincoln County.
