= John Montgomery Glover =

American politician (1822–1891)

Colonel John Montgomery Glover
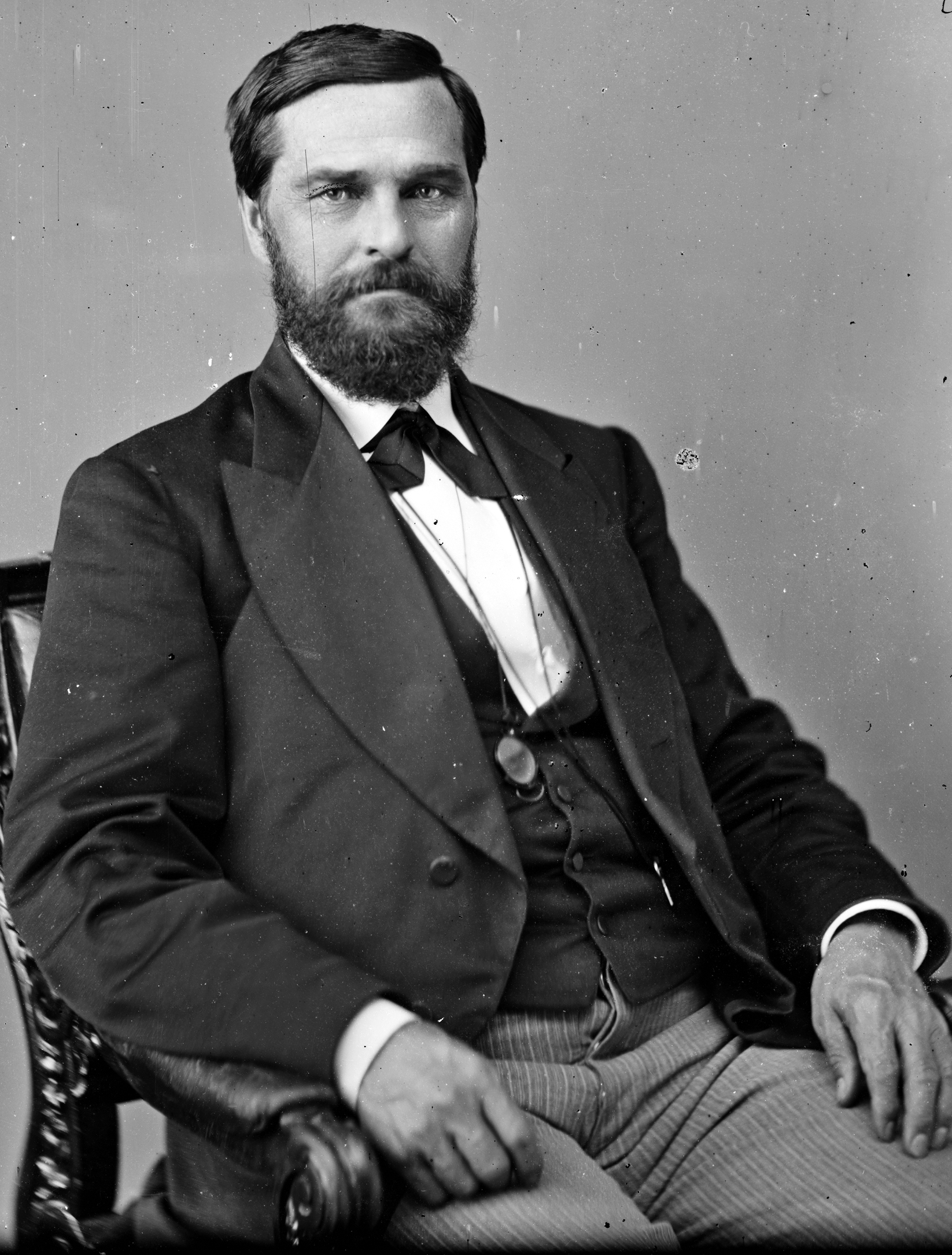

Representative for Missouri's 12th congressional district
- In office March 4, 1873 – March 3, 1879
- Preceded by: Office established
- Succeeded by: William H. Hatch

Personal details
- Born: September 4, 1822 Harrodsburg, Kentucky, U.S.
- Died: November 15, 1891 (aged 69) Missouri, U.S.
- Resting place: Woodland Cemetery, Quincy, Illinois, U.S.
- Relations: John Milton Glover (nephew)

John Montgomery Glover (September 4, 1822 – November 15, 1891) was an American politician, who served as a U.S. representative from Missouri, he was the uncle of John Milton Glover.

== Early life ==
Born in Harrodsburg, Kentucky, Glover attended the public schools in Kentucky. He moved to Missouri in 1836 with his parents, who settled in Knox County, near Newark, and continued his schooling. He attended Marion and Masonic Colleges, Philadelphia, Missouri, and studied law. He was admitted to the bar and commenced practice in St. Louis, Missouri, later moving to California in 1850 and continuing to practice law. He returned to Knox County, Missouri in 1855 to take charge of his father's affairs.

== Career ==
During the Civil War served as colonel of the Third Regiment, Missouri Volunteer Cavalry, beginning September 4, 1861. His service with the regiment was in a variety of points within Missouri and Arkansas. At various points during his service, he detached as the Commander of the District of Rolla, the Sub-District of Pilot Knob and the 2nd Brigade, Cavalry Division, Department of the Missouri. On February 23, 1864, he tendered his resignation in Springfield, Illinois, on account of impaired health.

He served as collector of internal revenue for the third district of Missouri from December 1, 1866, until March 3, 1867.

Glover was elected as a Democrat to the Forty-third, Forty-fourth, and Forty-fifth Congresses (March 4, 1873 – March 3, 1879). He served as chairman of the Committee on Expenditures in the Department of the Treasury (Forty-fifth Congress). He was an unsuccessful candidate for renomination in 1878. He engaged in agricultural pursuits. He died near Newark, Missouri, November 15, 1891. He was interred on his farm near Newark, Missouri. He was reinterred in Woodland Cemetery, Quincy, Illinois.

U.S. House of Representatives
Preceded by District created	Member of the U.S. House of Representatives from Missouri's 12th congressional district 1873–1879	Succeeded by William H. Hatch
