= 1884 Missouri gubernatorial election =

- November 4, 1884
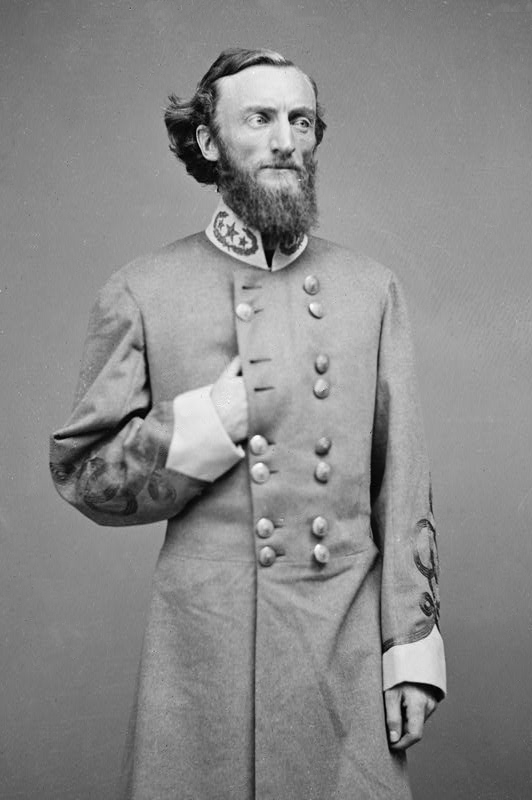

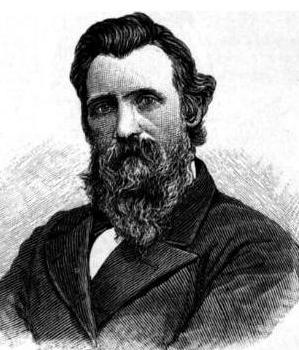
Nominee	John S. Marmaduke	Nicholas Ford
Party	Democratic	Republican
Popular vote	218,885	207,939
Percentage	50.05%	47.55%
- County results Marmaduke: 40–50% 50–60% 60–70% 70–80% 80–90% Ford: 40–50% 50–60% 60–70% 70–80% 80–90%
Governor before election
Thomas Theodore Crittenden
Democratic
Elected Governor
John S. Marmaduke
Democratic

The 1884 Missouri gubernatorial election was held on November 4, 1884, and resulted in a victory for the Democratic nominee, former Confederate general John S. Marmaduke, over the Republican candidate, former Congressman David Patterson Dyer, and Populist nominee John A. Brooks.

Marmaduke died in 1887 and was replaced for the remainder of this term by Lt. Gov. Albert P. Morehouse.

== Results ==
1884 gubernatorial election, Missouri
Party	Candidate	Votes	%	±%
Democratic	John S. Marmaduke	218,885	50.05	−2.18
Republican	Nicholas Ford	207,939	47.55	+8.91
Populist	John A. Brooks	10,529	2.41	+2.41
Majority		10,946	2.50	−11.09
Turnout		437,353	20.17	
Democratic hold		Swing		
