= 1904 United States House of Representatives elections =

House elections for the 59th U.S. Congress

- November 8, 1904 (Note: Three states held earlier elections between June 6 and September 12.)

All 386 seats in the United States House of Representatives 194 seats needed for a majority
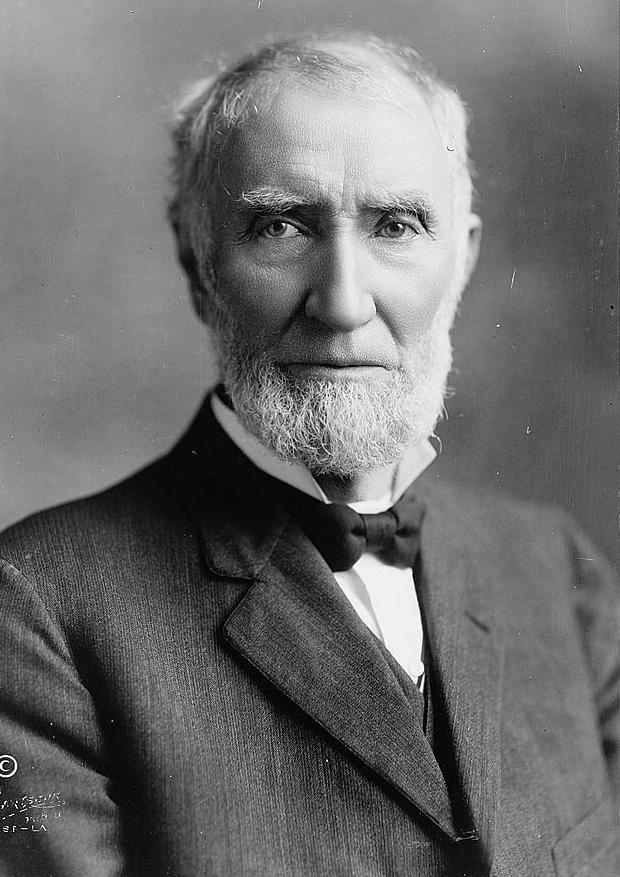

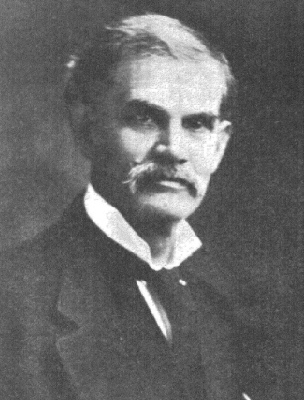
	Majority party	Minority party
Leader	Joseph Cannon	John Sharp Williams
Party	Republican	Democratic
Leader's seat	Illinois 18th	Mississippi 8th
Last election	206 seats	176 seats
Seats won	251	135
Seat change	▲45	▼41
Popular vote	7,173,481	5,386,523
Percentage	54.58%	40.98%
Swing	▲4.77pp	▼4.02pp
	Third party
Party	Independent
Last election	4 seats
Seats won	0
Seat change	▼4
Popular vote	21,402
Percentage	0.16%
Swing	▼0.40pp
- Results; Democratic gain Republican gain Democratic hold Republican hold
Speaker before election
Joseph Gurney Cannon
Republican
Elected Speaker
Joseph Gurney Cannon
Republican

The 1904 United States House of Representatives elections were held for the most part on November 8, 1904, with Oregon, Maine, and Vermont holding theirs early in either June or September. They coincided with the election to a full term of President Theodore Roosevelt. Elections were held for 386 seats of the United States House of Representatives, representing 45 states, to serve in the 59th United States Congress.

Roosevelt's popularity swept many Republican house candidates into office, cementing their majority over the opposition Democratic Party. Because Roosevelt came from a liberal wing of the Republican Party, his ideology was prevalent among freshman representatives. Progressive Republicanism mobilized a new base of support and proved to be especially popular among the Protestant middle-class workers who held jobs in business or in the front offices of industrial facilities.

== Election summaries ==
↓
135	251
Democratic	Republican

State	Type	Total seats	Republican		Democratic	
State	Type	Total seats	Seats	Change	Seats	Change
Alabama	District	9	0	Steady	9	Steady
Arkansas	District	7	0	Steady	7	Steady
California	District	8	8	▲3	0	▼3
Colorado	District +at-large	3	3	▲1	0	Steady
Connecticut	District +at-large	5	5	Steady	0	Steady
Delaware	At-large	1	1	▲1	0	▼1
Florida	District	3	0	Steady	3	Steady
Georgia	District	11	0	Steady	11	Steady
Idaho	At-large	1	1	Steady	0	Steady
Illinois	District	25	24	▲7	1	▼7
Indiana	District	13	11	▲2	2	▼2
Iowa	District	11	11	▲1	0	Steady
Kansas	District +at-large	8	8	Steady	0	Steady
Kentucky	District	11	2	▲1	9	▼1
Louisiana	District	7	0	Steady	7	Steady
Maine (Note: Elections held early.)	District	4	4	Steady	0	Steady
Maryland	District	6	3	▼1	3	▲1
Massachusetts	District	14	11	▲1	3	▼1
Michigan	District	12	12	▲1	0	▼1
Minnesota	District	9	9	▲1	0	▼1
Mississippi	District	8	0	Steady	8	Steady
Missouri	District	16	10	▲9	6	▼9
Montana	At-large	1	1	Steady	0	Steady
Nebraska	District	6	6	▲1	0	▼1
Nevada	At-large	1	0	Steady	1	Steady
New Hampshire	District	2	2	Steady	0	Steady
New Jersey	District	10	9	▲2	1	▼2
New York	District	37	26	▲6	11	▼6
North Carolina	District	10	1	▲1	9	▼1
North Dakota	District	2	2	Steady	0	Steady
Ohio	District	21	20	▲3	1	▼3
Oregon	District	2	2	Steady	0	Steady
Pennsylvania	District	32	31	▲3	1	▼3
Rhode Island	District	2	1	Steady	1	Steady
South Carolina	District	7	0	Steady	7	Steady
South Dakota	At-large	2	2	Steady	0	Steady
Tennessee	District	10	2	Steady	8	Steady
Texas	District	16	0	Steady	16	Steady
Utah	At-large	1	1	Steady	0	Steady
Vermont	District	2	2	Steady	0	Steady
Virginia	District	10	1	Steady	9	Steady
Washington	At-large	3	3	Steady	0	Steady
West Virginia	District	5	5	Steady	0	Steady
Wisconsin	District	11	10	Steady	1	Steady
Wyoming	At-large	1	1	Steady	0	Steady
Total		386	251; 65.0%	▲41	135; 35.0%	▼41

Popular vote
Republican	54.58%
Democratic	40.98%
Independent	0.16%
Others	4.28%

House seats
Republican	65.03%
Democratic	34.97%

The previous election of 1902 saw 3 Independent Republicans elected in the Pittsburgh area of Pennsylvania.

=== Maps ===
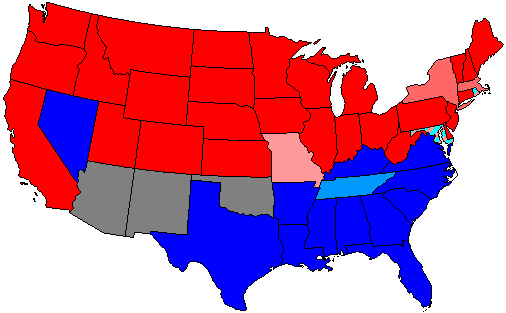
House seats by party holding plurality in state: 80+% Democratic / 80+% Republican; 60+% to 80% Democratic / 60+% to 80% Republican; Up to 60% Democratic / Up to 60% Republican

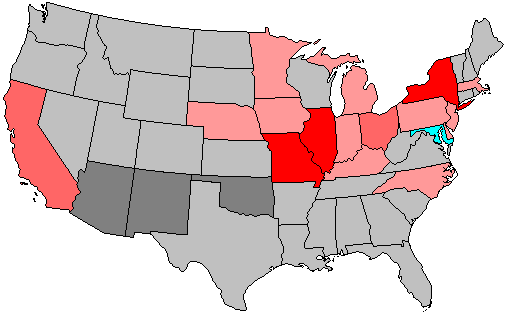
Net gain in party representation: 6+ Democratic gain / 6+ Republican gain; 3–5 Democratic gain / 3–5 Republican gain; 1–2 Democratic gain / 1–2 Republican gain; no net change

Winner's vote share in each congressional district

Republican vote share in each congressional district

Democratic vote share in each congressional district

Socialist vote share in each congressional district

== Early election dates ==
In 1904, three states, with 8 seats among them, held elections early:

- June 6 Oregon
- September 6 Vermont
- September 12 Maine

== Special elections ==
District	Incumbent			This race	
District	Member	Party	First elected	Results	Candidates
South Carolina 2	George W. Croft	Democratic	1902	Incumbent died March 10, 1904. New member elected May 17, 1904. Winner was not a candidate for the next term; see below.	▌ ✓ James O. Patterson (Democratic); [data missing]
California 3	Victor H. Metcalf	Republican	1898	Incumbent resigned July 1, 1904 to become U.S. Secretary of Commerce and Labor. New member elected November 8, 1904. Republican hold. Winner was also elected to the next term; see below.	▌ ✓ Joseph R. Knowland (Republican) 77.5%; ▌Henry C. McPike (Democratic) 22.5%
Ohio 19

== Alabama ==
District	Incumbent			This race	
District	Member	Party	First elected	Results	Candidates
Alabama 1	George W. Taylor	Democratic	1896	Incumbent re-elected.	▌ ✓ George W. Taylor (Democratic) 100%
Alabama 2	Ariosto A. Wiley	Democratic	1900	Incumbent re-elected.	▌ ✓ Ariosto A. Wiley (Democratic) 100%
Alabama 3	Henry D. Clayton Jr.	Democratic	1896	Incumbent re-elected.	▌ ✓ Henry D. Clayton Jr. (Democratic) 98.3%; ▌ C. J. Hammett (Prohibition) 1.7%
Alabama 4	Sydney J. Bowie	Democratic	1900	Incumbent re-elected.	▌ ✓ Sydney J. Bowie (Democratic) 76.3%; ▌ John W. Kitchens (Republican) 23.7%
Alabama 5	J. Thomas Heflin	Democratic	1904	Incumbent re-elected.	▌ ✓ J. Thomas Heflin (Democratic) 76.3%; ▌ B. W. Walker (Republican) 23.4%; ▌ J. R. Caldwell (Prohibition) 0.3%
Alabama 6	John H. Bankhead	Democratic	1886	Incumbent re-elected.	▌ ✓ John H. Bankhead (Democratic) 76.6%; ▌ S. R. Crumpton (Republican) 23.5%
Alabama 7	John L. Burnett	Democratic	1898	Incumbent re-elected.	▌ ✓ John L. Burnett (Democratic) 55.9%; ▌ T. W. Powell (Republican) 44.1%
Alabama 8	William Richardson	Democratic	1900	Incumbent re-elected.	▌ ✓ William Richardson (Democratic) 84.3%; ▌ J. W. Roberts (Republican) 15.7%
Alabama 9	Oscar Underwood	Democratic	1894	Incumbent re-elected.	▌ ✓ Oscar Underwood (Democratic) 81.7%; ▌ J. T. Blakemore (Republican) 15.1%; ▌ F. X. Waldherst (Socialist) 3.2%

== Arkansas ==
District	Incumbent			This race	
District	Member	Party	First elected	Results	Candidates
Arkansas 1	Robert B. Macon	Democratic	1902	Incumbent re-elected.	▌ ✓ Robert B. Macon (Democratic) 99.3%
Arkansas 2	Stephen Brundidge Jr.	Democratic	1896	Incumbent re-elected.	▌ ✓ Stephen Brundidge Jr. (Democratic) 62.7%; ▌ Francis William Tucker (Republican) 37.3%
Arkansas 3	Hugh A. Dinsmore	Democratic	1892	Incumbent lost renomination. Democratic hold.	▌ ✓ John C. Floyd (Democratic) 56.3%; ▌ J. F. Mayes (Republican) 43.7%
Arkansas 4	John S. Little	Democratic	1894	Incumbent re-elected	▌ ✓ John S. Little (Democratic) 59.4%; ▌ James Brizzolara (Republican) 40.6%
Arkansas 5	Charles C. Reid	Democratic	1900	Incumbent re-elected.	▌ ✓ Charles C. Reid (Democratic) 60.9%; ▌ A. S. Fowler (Republican) 39.1%
Arkansas 6	Joseph T. Robinson	Democratic	1902	Incumbent re-elected.	▌ ✓ Joseph T. Robinson (Democratic) 62.0%; ▌ R. C. Thompson (Republican) 38.1%
Arkansas 7	Robert M. Wallace	Democratic	1902	Incumbent re-elected.	▌ ✓ Robert M. Wallace (Democratic) 99.1%

== California ==
District	Incumbent			This race	
District	Member	Party	First elected	Results	Candidates
California 1	James Gillett	Republican	1902	Incumbent re-elected.	▌ ✓ James Gillett (Republican) 54.1%; ▌Anthony Caminetti (Democratic) 39.3%; ▌A. J. Gaylord (Socialist) 5.5%; ▌Jarrot Laban Rollins (Prohibition) 1.1%
California 2	Theodore A. Bell	Democratic	1902	Incumbent lost re-election. Republican gain.	▌ ✓ Duncan E. McKinlay (Republican) 49.2%; ▌Theodore A. Bell (Democratic) 46.6%; ▌J. H. White (Socialist) 3.3%; ▌Eli P. LaCell (Prohibition) 0.9%
California 3	Victor H. Metcalf	Republican	1898	Incumbent resigned July 1, 1904 to become U.S. Secretary of Commerce and Labor. Republican hold. Winner was also elected to finish the current term; see above.	▌ ✓ Joseph R. Knowland (Republican) 68.6%; ▌Henry C. McPike (Democratic) 20.1%; ▌M. Lesser (Socialist) 10.1%; ▌Bates Morris (Prohibition) 1.3%
California 4	Edward J. Livernash	Democratic - Union Labor	1902	Incumbent lost re-election. Republican gain.	▌ ✓ Julius Kahn (Republican) 56.8%; ▌Edward J. Livernash (Democratic - Union Labor) 36.4%; ▌William Costley (Socialist) 6.4%; ▌Hubert R. Chapin (Prohibition) 0.4%
California 5	William J. Wynn	Democratic	1902	Incumbent lost re-election. Republican gain.	▌ ✓ Everis A. Hayes (Republican) 52.3%; ▌William J. Wynn (Democratic) 39.7%; ▌Frank R. Whitney (Socialist) 5%; ▌Charles J. Williams (Union Labor) 2%; ▌George B. Pratt (Prohibition) 1%
California 6	James C. Needham	Republican	1898	Incumbent re-elected.	▌ ✓ James C. Needham (Republican) 55.1%; ▌William M. Conley (Democratic) 38.3%; ▌J. L. Cobb (Socialist) 4.5%; ▌Joel H. Smith (Prohibition) 2.2%
California 7	James McLachlan	Republican	1900	Incumbent re-elected.	▌ ✓ James McLachlan (Republican) 64.2%; ▌W. O. Morton (Democratic) 23.3%; ▌Frank I. Wheat (Socialist) 7.4%; ▌John Sobieski (Prohibition) 5.1%
California 8	Milton J. Daniels	Republican	1902	Incumbent retired. Republican hold.	▌ ✓ Sylvester C. Smith (Republican) 55.6%; ▌Charles A. Barlow (Democratic) 30.2%; ▌Noble A. Richardson (Socialist) 10.9%; ▌Benjamin J. Cloes (Prohibition) 3.4%

== Colorado ==
District	Incumbent			This race	
District	Member	Party	First elected	Results	Candidates
Colorado 1	Robert W. Bonynge	Republican	1902 (contest)	Incumbent re-elected.	▌ ✓ Robert W. Bonynge (Republican) 51.0%; ▌Clay B. Whitford (Democratic) 45.6%; Others: ▌William C. Johnston (Prohibition) 2.0%; ▌Otto Q. Beckworth (Socialist) 1.1%; ▌John J. Bradley (Populist) 0.3%
Colorado 2	Herschel M. Hogg	Republican	1902	Incumbent re-elected.	▌ ✓ Herschel M. Hogg (Republican) 52.0%; ▌Joseph H. Maupin (Democratic) 44.7%; Others: ▌Isaac Tarkoff (Socialist) 1.9%; ▌Edward S. Whitlock (Prohibition) 1.2%; ▌Alexander Coleman (Populist) 0.3%
Colorado at-large	Franklin E. Brooks	Republican	1902	Incumbent re-elected.	▌ ✓ Franklin E. Brooks (Republican) 50.2%; ▌John F. Shafroth (Democratic) 46.5%; Others: ▌Forrest Woodside (Socialist) 1.5%; ▌William H. McClure (Prohibition) 1.5%; ▌Robert H. Northcott (Populist) 0.3%

== Connecticut ==
District	Incumbent			This race	
District	Member	Party	First elected	Results	Candidates
Connecticut 1	E. Stevens Henry	Republican	1894	Incumbent re-elected.	▌ ✓ E. Stevens Henry (Republican) 56.9%; ▌J. Howard Morse (Democratic) 39.3%; Others: ▌Rodney E. Richardson (Socialist) 2.3%; ▌Leon C. Pinney (Prohibition) 0.9%; ▌Charles F. Roberts (Soc. Labor) 0.4%; ▌Charles F. Michael (Populist) 0.3
Connecticut 2	Nehemiah D. Sperry	Republican	1894	Incumbent re-elected.	▌ ✓ Nehemiah D. Sperry (Republican) 56.9%; ▌Louis A. Fisk (Democratic) 38.1%; ▌Eugene Toomey (Socialist) 3.7%; Others: ▌George W. Banks (Prohibition) 0.6%; ▌Frederick Gay (Populist) 0.3%; ▌Michael J. Bumstead (Soc. Labor) 0.3%
Connecticut 3	Frank B. Brandegee	Republican	1902 (special)	Incumbent re-elected.	▌ ✓ Frank B. Brandegee (Republican) 60.2%; ▌Abel P. Tanner (Democratic) 37.7%; Others: ▌William Woodward (Prohibition) 1.1%; ▌C. Irwin Barstow (Socialist) 0.8%; ▌Amedie B. Lafreniere (Soc. Labor) 0.3%
Connecticut 4	Ebenezer J. Hill	Republican	1894	Incumbent re-elected.	▌ ✓ Ebenezer J. Hill (Republican) 59.2%; ▌Edward F. Hallen (Democratic) 38.6%; Others: ▌James Fitzgerald (Socialist) 1.2%; ▌George H. Wallace (Prohibition) 0.7%; ▌Everett King (Soc. Labor) 0.4%
Connecticut at-large	None (new seat)			New seat. Republican gain.	▌ ✓ George L. Lilley (Republican) 57.0%; ▌William Kennedy (Democratic) 39.4%; ▌Charles T. Peach (Socialist) 2.3%; Others: ▌Henry B. Brown (Prohibition) 0.8%; ▌William Daly (Soc. Labor) 0.3%; ▌Austin B. Fuller (Populist) 0.2%

== Delaware ==
District	Incumbent			This race	
District	Member	Party	First elected	Results	Candidates
Delaware at-large	Henry A. Houston	Democratic	1902	Incumbent retired. Republican gain.	▌ ✓ Hiram R. Burton (Republican) 53.7%; ▌ Edward D. Hearne (Democratic) 44.6%; ▌ William Faries (Prohibition) 1.4%; ▌ William Faries (Socialist) 0.3%

== Florida ==
District	Incumbent			This race	
District	Member	Party	First elected	Results	Candidates
Florida 1	Stephen M. Sparkman	Democratic	1894	Incumbent re-elected.	▌ ✓ Stephen M. Sparkman (Democratic) 75.1%; ▌E. R. Gunby (Republican) 20.1%; ▌Z. A. Middlebrooks (Socialist) 4.7%
Florida 2	Robert Wyche Davis	Democratic	1896	Incumbent retired. Democratic hold.	▌ ✓ Frank Clark (Democratic) 77.2%; ▌John M. Cheney (Republican) 19.9%; ▌W. B. Wood (Socialist) 2.9%
Florida 3	William B. Lamar	Democratic	1902	Incumbent re-elected.	▌ ✓ William B. Lamar (Democratic) 84.3%; ▌L. M. Ware (Republican) 12.9%; ▌W. B. Wood (Socialist) 2.8%

== Georgia ==
District	Incumbent			This race	
District	Member	Party	First elected	Results	Candidates
Georgia 1	Rufus E. Lester	Democratic	1888	Incumbent re-elected.	▌ ✓ Rufus E. Lester (Democratic) 94.9%; ▌ D. B. Rigdon (Republican) 4.2%; ▌ R. M. Hatch (Independen) 0.9%
Georgia 2	James M. Griggs	Democratic	1896	Incumbent re-elected.	▌ ✓ James M. Griggs (Democratic) 99.9%
Georgia 3	Elijah B. Lewis	Democratic	1896	Incumbent re-elected.	▌ ✓ Elijah B. Lewis (Democratic) 99.0%; ▌ C. H. Moore (Republican) 1.0%
Georgia 4	William C. Adamson	Democratic	1896	Incumbent re-elected.	▌ ✓ William C. Adamson (Democratic) 91.6%; ▌ J. F. Jones (Republican) 8.4%
Georgia 5	Leonidas F. Livingston	Democratic	1890	Incumbent re-elected.	▌ ✓ Leonidas F. Livingston (Democratic) 71.4%; ▌ C. P. Garver (Republican) 28.6%
Georgia 6	Charles L. Bartlett	Democratic	1894	Incumbent re-elected.	▌ ✓ Charles L. Bartlett (Democratic) 96.4%; ▌ W. B. Poe (Populist) 3.4%
Georgia 7	John W. Maddox	Democratic	1892	Incumbent retired. Democratic hold.	▌ ✓ Gordon Lee (Democratic) 69.2%; ▌ Thaddeus Pickett (Independent Republican) 30.8%
Georgia 8	William M. Howard	Democratic	1896	Incumbent re-elected.	▌ ✓ William M. Howard (Democratic) 88.9%; ▌ W. M. Houston (Populist) 10.2%; ▌ J. C. Vanduzer (Republican) 0.9%
Georgia 9	Farish Tate	Democratic	1892	Incumbent lost renomination. Democratic hold.	▌ ✓ Thomas M. Bell (Democratic) 68.1%; ▌ J. M. Ashley (Republican) 31.9%
Georgia 10	Thomas W. Hardwick	Democratic	1902	Incumbent re-elected.	▌ ✓ Thomas W. Hardwick (Democratic) 91.6%; ▌ H. M. Porter (Populist) 8.4%
Georgia 11	William G. Brantley	Democratic	1896	Incumbent re-elected.	▌ ✓ William G. Brantley (Democratic) 77.3%; ▌ A. B. Finley (Republican) 22.7%

== Idaho ==
District	Incumbent			This race	
District	Member	Party	First elected	Results	Candidates
Idaho at-large	Burton L. French	Republican	1902	Incumbent re-elected.	▌ ✓ Burton L. French (Republican) 63.66%; ▌Benjamin F. Clay (Democratic) 28.62%; ▌John H. Morrison (Socialist) 5.98%; ▌Allen K. Wright (Prohibition) 1.43%; ▌D. L. Badley (Populist) 0.31%

== Illinois ==
District	Incumbent			This race	
District	Member	Party	First elected	Results	Candidates
Illinois 1	Martin Emerich	Democratic	1902	Incumbent retired. Republican gain.	▌ ✓ Martin B. Madden (Republican) 58.0%; ▌ John S. Oehmen (Democratic) 22.1%; ▌ David S. Geer (Independent Republican) 12.5%; ▌ Edward Loewenthal (Socialist) 5.6%; ▌ William H. Craig (Prohibition) 0.9%; ▌ Charles Roberts (Populist) 0.6%; ▌ J. P. Lynch (Continental) 0.3%
Illinois 2	James Robert Mann	Republican	1896	Incumbent re-elected.	▌ ✓ James Robert Mann (Republican) 66.3%; ▌ Charles B. Stafford (Democratic) 21.1%; ▌ H. Van Middlesworth (Socialist) 11.0%; ▌ Frank V. Irish (Prohibition) 1.6%
Illinois 3	William Warfield Wilson	Republican	1902	Incumbent re-elected.	▌ ✓ William Warfield Wilson (Republican) 61.7%; ▌ Willis C. Stone (Democratic) 23.8%; ▌ Edward Deikes (Socialist) 12.2%; ▌ Edward I. Ames (Prohibition) 2.3%
Illinois 4	George Peter Foster	Democratic	1898	Incumbent lost re-election. Republican gain.	▌ ✓ Charles S. Wharton (Republican) 45.2%; ▌ George Peter Foster (Democratic) 33.4%; ▌ James W. Johnson (Socialist) 20.0%; ▌ James C. Bohart (Prohibition) 1.4%
Illinois 5	James McAndrews	Democratic	1900	Incumbent retired. Republican gain.	▌ ✓ Anthony Michalek (Republican) 44.9%; ▌ Charles J. Vopicka (Democratic) 41.9%; ▌ Robert W. Schoening (Socialist) 12.1%; ▌ H. M. Mills (Prohibition) 1.1%
Illinois 6	William Lorimer	Republican	1902	Incumbent re-elected.	▌ ✓ William Lorimer (Republican) 50.8%; ▌ George P. Gubbins (Democratic) 28.7%; ▌ Arthur Gourley (Prohibition) 14.2%; ▌ A. S. Edwards (Socialist) 6.3%
Illinois 7	Philip Knopf	Republican	1902	Incumbent re-elected	▌ ✓ Philip Knopf (Republican) 59.4%; ▌ George S. Foster (Democratic) 25.5%; ▌ George Koop (Socialist) 13.4%; ▌ William P. Olmstead (Prohibition) 1.7%
Illinois 8	William F. Mahoney	Democratic	1900	Incumbent died. Republican gain.	▌ ✓ Charles McGavin (Republican) 51.7%; ▌ William Preston Harrison (Democratic) 33.5%; ▌ Marcus H. Taft (Socialist) 10.9%; ▌ M. J. Sullivan (Independent Democratic) 2.9%; ▌ John H. Siljander (Prohibition) 1.0%
Illinois 9	Henry Sherman Boutell	Republican	1897	Incumbent re-elected.	▌ ✓ Henry Sherman Boutell (Republican) 57.2%; ▌ Quin O'Brien (Democratic) 34.5%; ▌ Adolph Harrick (Socialist) 7.1%; ▌ Bernard Solinisky (Prohibition) 1.2%
Illinois 10	George E. Foss	Republican	1894	Incumbent re-elected.	▌ ✓ George E. Foss (Republican) 66.2%; ▌ James L. Turnock (Democratic) 25.0%; ▌ Robert Knox (Socialist) 7.1%; ▌ Eugene T. Hay (Prohibition) 1.7%
Illinois 11	Howard M. Snapp	Republican	1902	Incumbent re-elected.	▌ ✓ Howard M. Snapp (Republican) 70.7%; ▌ James O. Monroe (Democratic) 21.2%; ▌ August Weishmer (Socialist) 4.4%; ▌ James A. Cosby (Prohibition) 3.7%
Illinois 12	Charles Eugene Fuller	Republican	1902	Incumbent re-elected.	▌ ✓ Charles Eugene Fuller (Republican) 70.2%; ▌ Alex Vaughey (Democratic) 20.1%; ▌ David A. Syme (Prohibition) 5.1%; ▌ Theodore Johnson (Socialist) 4.6%
Illinois 13	Robert R. Hitt	Republican	1882	Incumbent re-elected.	▌ ✓ Robert R. Hitt (Republican) 67.7%; ▌ John Erwin (Democratic) 25.7%; ▌ James H. Woertendyke (Prohibition) 4.9%; ▌ F. C. Weisser (Socialist) 1.4%
Illinois 14	Benjamin F. Marsh	Republican	1902	Incumbent re-elected.	▌ ✓ Benjamin F. Marsh (Republican) 58.4%; ▌ David W. Matthews (Democratic) 29.8%; ▌ John Higgins (Socialist) 6.9%; ▌ Louis F. Gumbart (Prohibition) 4.9%
Illinois 15	George W. Prince	Republican	1895	Incumbent re-elected.	▌ ✓ George W. Prince (Republican) 60.7%; ▌ Meredith Walker (Democratic) 30.9%; ▌ Harvey Savill (Socialist) 4.5%; ▌ Hugh Grieg (Prohibition) 3.9%
Illinois 16	Joseph V. Graff	Republican	1894	Incumbent re-elected.	▌ ✓ Joseph V. Graff (Republican) 60.5%; ▌ Thomas Cooper (Democratic) 32.3%; ▌ S. A. Knopfnogle (Socialist) 4.1%; ▌ George H. Warner (Prohibition) 3.1%
Illinois 17	John A. Sterling	Republican	1902	Incumbent re-elected.	▌ ✓ John A. Sterling (Republican) 58.8%; ▌ Zoath F. Yost (Democratic) 32.6%; ▌ William W. Houser (Prohibition) 5.7%; ▌ J. F. Saunders (Socialist) 2.9%
Illinois 18	Joseph Gurney Cannon	Republican	1892	Incumbent re-elected.	▌ ✓ Joseph Gurney Cannon (Republican) 62.0%; ▌ Coulson V. McClenathan (Democratic) 30.8%; ▌ Samuel S. Jones (Prohibition) 4.9%; ▌ J. W. Rogers (Socialist) 2.2%
Illinois 19	Vespasian Warner	Republican	1894	Incumbent retired to run for Governor of Illinois. Republican hold.	▌ ✓ William B. McKinley (Republican) 56.9%; ▌ Adolph Sumerlin (Democratic) 37.1%; ▌ Joseph O. Cunningham (Prohibition) 4.8%; ▌ B. G. DeGroot (Socialist) 1.2%
Illinois 20	Henry T. Rainey	Democratic	1902	Incumbent re-elected.	▌ ✓ Henry T. Rainey (Democratic) 48.9%; ▌ Cornelius J. Doyle (Republican) 45.1%; ▌ Norton M. Rigg (Prohibition) 2.5%; ▌ H. Wolf (Socialist) 1.2%
Illinois 21	Ben F. Caldwell	Democratic	1898	Incumbent lost re-election. Republican gain.	▌ ✓ Zeno J. Rives (Republican) 47.7%; ▌ Ben F. Caldwell (Democratic) 45.2%; ▌ B. F. Winters (Prohibition) 4.2%; ▌ William Koenigkrammer (Socialist) 2.9%
Illinois 22	William A. Rodenberg	Republican	1902	Incumbent re-elected.	▌ ✓ William A. Rodenberg (Republican) 53.5%; ▌ J. Nick Perrin (Democratic) 40.5%; ▌ John Wachter (Socialist) 3.1%; ▌ William B. Winton (Prohibition) 2.0%; ▌ Harry Bloemana (Socialist Labor) 0.8%
Illinois 23	Joseph B. Crowley	Democratic	1898	Incumbent retired. Republican gain.	▌ ✓ Frank S. Dickson (Republican) 47.7%; ▌ M. D. Foster (Democratic) 45.9%; ▌ William P. Habberton (Prohibition) 5.2%; ▌ Joseph Palmer (Socialist) 1.2%
Illinois 24	James R. Williams	Democratic	1898	Incumbent lost re-election. Republican gain.	▌ ✓ Pleasant T. Chapman (Republican) 50.7%; ▌ James R. Williams (Democratic) 46.1%; ▌ W. A. Morgan (Prohibition) 3.0%; ▌ Edward Turner (Populist) 0.2%
Illinois 25	George Washington Smith	Republican	1888	Incumbent re-elected.	▌ ✓ George Washington Smith (Republican) 55.6%; ▌ Charles L. Otrich (Democratic) 36.2%; ▌ Charles F. Kiest (Prohibition) 5.7%; ▌ D. Boone (Socialist) 2.5%

== Indiana ==
District	Incumbent			This race	
District	Member	Party	First elected	Results	Candidates
Indiana 1	James A. Hemenway	Republican	1894	Incumbent re-elected but resigned when elected U.S. Senator.	▌ ✓ James A. Hemenway (Republican) 51.1%; ▌ Albert G. Holcomb (Democratic) 42.8%; ▌ Alvin L. Heim (Socialist) 3.1%; ▌ Clarence Defur (Prohibition) 1.9%
Indiana 2	Robert W. Miers	Democratic	1896	Incumbent lost re-election. Republican gain.	▌ ✓ John C. Chaney (Republican) 49.7%; ▌ Robert W. Miers (Democratic) 46.8%; ▌ John Wadsworth (Socialist) 1.6%; ▌ Alexander Asbury (Prohibition) 1.5%; ▌ James W. Clarke (Populist) 0.4%
Indiana 3	William T. Zenor	Democratic	1896	Incumbent re-elected.	▌ ✓ William T. Zenor (Democratic) 53.1%; ▌ John E. Dillon (Republican) 44.7%; ▌ Theodore J. Shrode (Prohibition) 1.7%; ▌ R. Thompson (Socialist) 0.5%
Indiana 4	Francis M. Griffith	Democratic	1897	Incumbent retired. Democratic hold.	▌ ✓ Lincoln Dixon (Democratic) 50.8%; ▌ Anderson Percifield (Republican) 46.6%; ▌ Fred O. Lamoreaux (Prohibition) 2.1%; ▌ Michael T. Carmichael (Socialist) 0.5%
Indiana 5	Elias S. Holliday	Republican	1900	Incumbent re-elected.	▌ ✓ Elias S. Holliday (Republican) 52.0%; ▌ Claude G. Bowers (Democratic) 42.6%; ▌ David Hadley (Prohibition) 2.8%; ▌ W. Mahoney (Socialist) 2.3%; ▌ L. G. Johnson (Populist) 0.3%
Indiana 6	James E. Watson	Republican	1898	Incumbent re-elected.	▌ ✓ James E. Watson (Republican) 56.3%; ▌ Uriah S. Jackson (Democratic) 42.7%; ▌ W. Price (Socialist) 1.0%
Indiana 7	Jesse Overstreet	Republican	1894	Incumbent re-elected.	▌ ✓ Jesse Overstreet (Republican) 57.1%; ▌ Levi P. Harlan (Democratic) 39.0%; ▌ Elijah W. Lawton (Prohibition) 1.8%; ▌ D. Z. McClure (Socialist) 1.5%; ▌ J. T. Remby (Socialist Labor) 0.5%; ▌ J. Carter (Populist) 0.1%
Indiana 8	George W. Cromer	Republican	1898	Incumbent re-elected.	▌ ✓ George W. Cromer (Republican) 52.2%; ▌ Edward C. Dehority (Democratic) 39.1%; ▌ Aaron Worth (Prohibition) 6.5%; ▌ C. Gaines (Socialist) 2.0%; ▌ C. Barthing (Populist) 0.2%
Indiana 9	Charles B. Landis	Republican	1896	Incumbent re-elected.	▌ ✓ Charles B. Landis (Republican) 52.9%; ▌ Clyde H. Jones (Democratic) 41.8%; ▌ Albert B. Fitzpatrick (Prohibition) 4.6%; ▌ F. Bull (Socialist) 0.4%; ▌ G. Ashley (Populist) 0.3%
Indiana 10	Edgar D. Crumpacker	Republican	1896	Incumbent re-elected.	▌ ✓ Edgar D. Crumpacker (Republican) 58.5%; ▌ Worth W. Pepple (Democratic) 39.7%; ▌ Isaac S. Wade (Prohibition) 1.8%
Indiana 11	Frederick Landis	Republican	1902	Incumbent re-elected.	▌ ✓ Frederick Landis (Republican) 53.6%; ▌ Clement M. Holderman (Democratic) 38.8%; ▌ Edward H. Kennedy (Prohibition) 6.1%; ▌ B. Baker (Socialist) 1.5%
Indiana 12	James M. Robinson	Democratic	1896	Incumbent lost re-election. Republican gain.	▌ ✓ Newton W. Gilbert (Republican) 50.5%; ▌ James M. Robinson (Democratic) 46.4%; ▌ George C. Ulmer (Prohibition) 1.9%; ▌ James F. Morse (Socialist) 1.2%
Indiana 13	Abraham L. Brick	Republican	1898	Incumbent re-elected.	▌ ✓ Abraham L. Brick (Republican) 52.5%; ▌ Frank E. Hering (Democratic) 40.1%; ▌ C. R. Heath (Socialist) 4.4%; ▌ Charles F. Holler (Prohibition) 3.0%

== Iowa ==
District	Incumbent			This race	
District	Member	Party	First elected	Results	Candidates
Iowa 1	Thomas Hedge	Republican	1898	Incumbent re-elected	▌ ✓ Thomas Hedge (Republican) 54.7%; ▌ John E. Craig (Democratic) 40.9%; ▌ William M. Hay (Prohibition) 2.8%; ▌ G. H. Schick (Socialist) 1.6%
Iowa 2	Martin J. Wade	Democratic	1902	Incumbent lost re-election. Republican gain.	▌ ✓ Albert F. Dawson (Republican) 48.1%; ▌ Martin J. Wade (Democratic) 47.7%; ▌ Carl Rieck (Socialist) 3.6%; ▌ J. E. Park (Prohibition) 0.6%
Iowa 3	Benjamin P. Birdsall	Republican	1902	Incumbent re-elected	▌ ✓ Benjamin P. Birdsall (Republican) 65.3%; ▌ J. W. Mallon (Democratic) 31.6%; ▌ E. D. Hammond (Socialist) 3.1%
Iowa 4	Gilbert N. Haugen	Republican	1898	Incumbent re-elected.	▌ ✓ Gilbert N. Haugen (Republican) 64.5%; ▌ W. O. Holman (Democratic) 32.8%; ▌ W. W. Williams (Prohibition) 1.4%; ▌ F. E. Macha (Socialist) 1.1%; ▌ C. A. Gaylord (Populist) 0.2%
Iowa 5	Robert G. Cousins	Republican	1892	Incumbent re-elected.	▌ ✓ Robert G. Cousins (Republican) 59.7%; ▌ John Aloysius Green (Democratic) 35.4%; ▌ Oren D. Ellett (Prohibition) 2.9%; ▌ M. F. DeWoody (Socialist) 2.0%
Iowa 6	John F. Lacey	Republican	1892	Incumbent re-elected.	▌ ✓ John F. Lacey (Republican) 58.4%; ▌ S. A. Brewster (Democratic) 34.9%; ▌ Perry Engle (Socialist) 3.9%; ▌ Ira D. Kellogg (Prohibition) 2.7%; ▌ E. J. Emmets (Populist) 0.1%
Iowa 7	John A. T. Hull	Republican	1890	Incumbent re-elected.	▌ ✓ John A. T. Hull (Republican) 64.3%; ▌ John T. Mulvaney (Democratic) 28.0%; ▌ G. R. Jones (Socialist) 4.1%; ▌ E. E. Bennett (Prohibition) 3.6%
Iowa 8	William P. Hepburn	Republican	1892	Incumbent re-elected.	▌ ✓ William P. Hepburn (Republican) 63.0%; ▌ John V. Bennett (Democratic) 34.4%; ▌ A. F. Thompson (Socialist) 2.6%
Iowa 9	Walter I. Smith	Republican	1900	Incumbent re-elected.	▌ ✓ Walter I. Smith (Republican) 63.9%; ▌ H. Wilcox (Democratic) 32.7%; ▌ J. O. McElroy (Socialist) 1.7%; ▌ C. F. Dietz (Prohibition) 1.7%
Iowa 10	James P. Conner	Republican	1900	Incumbent re-elected.	▌ ✓ James P. Conner (Republican) 67.3%; ▌ W. J. Branagan (Democratic) 28.0%; ▌ James W. Woodward (Prohibition) 2.6%; ▌ S. W. Brown (Socialist) 2.1%
Iowa 11	Lot Thomas	Republican	1898	Incumbent lost renomination. Republican hold.	▌ ✓ Elbert H. Hubbard (Republican) 69.1%; ▌ P. D. Vanoosterhaut (Democratic) 28.7%; ▌ J. N. Wilson (Socialist) 2.2%

== Kansas ==
District	Incumbent			This race	
District	Member	Party	First elected	Results	Candidates
Kansas 1	Charles Curtis	Republican	1892	Incumbent re-elected.	▌ ✓ Charles Curtis (Republican) 57.8%; ▌A. M. Harvey (Democratic) 40.6%; ▌J. M. Willets (Socialist) 1.6%
Kansas 2	Justin De Witt Bowersock	Republican	1898	Incumbent re-elected.	▌ ✓ Justin De Witt Bowersock (Republican) 54.8%; ▌ C. F. Hutchings (Democratic) 42.1%; ▌ W. G. Kitchener (Socialist) 3.1%
Kansas 3	Philip P. Campbell	Republican	1902	Incumbent re-elected.	▌ ✓ Philip P. Campbell (Republican) 59.5%; ▌ William H. Ryan (Democratic) 31.2%; ▌ T. C. Davis (Socialist) 9.3%
Kansas 4	James Monroe Miller	Republican	1898	Incumbent re-elected.	▌ ✓ James Monroe Miller (Republican) 62.8%; ▌ Frank B. Lowrance (Democratic/Populist) 37.2%
Kansas 5	William A. Calderhead	Republican	1898	Incumbent re-elected.	▌ ✓ William A. Calderhead (Republican) 65.1%; ▌ John A. Flack (Democratic/Populist) 34.9%
Kansas 6	William A. Reeder	Republican	1898	Incumbent re-elected.	▌ ✓ William A. Reeder (Republican) 56.1%; ▌ H. O. Caster (Democratic) 34.1%; ▌ G. D. Franklin (Socialist) 5.3%; ▌ A. G. Smith (Prohibition) 4.5%
Kansas 7	Victor Murdock	Republican	1903	Incumbent re-elected.	▌ ✓ Victor Murdock (Republican) 64.5%; ▌ M. Belisle (Democratic) 35.5%
Kansas at-large	Charles Frederick Scott	Republican	1900	Incumbent re-elected.	▌ ✓ Charles Frederick Scott (Republican) 60.3%; ▌Francis M. Brady (Democratic) 33.9%; ▌Christopher Bischir (Socialist) 3.8%; ▌Duncan McFarlane (Prohibition) 2.0%

== Kentucky ==
District	Incumbent			This race	
District	Member	Party	First elected	Results	Candidates
Kentucky 1	Ollie Murray James	Democratic	1902	Incumbent re-elected.	▌ ✓ Ollie Murray James (Democratic) 62.3%; ▌ J. C. Spaight (Republican) 33.5%; ▌ T. E. Richey (Prohibition) 2.7%; ▌ J. H. Lackey (Populist) 1.5%
Kentucky 2	Augustus Owsley Stanley	Democratic	1902	Incumbent re-elected.	▌ ✓ Augustus Owsley Stanley (Democratic) 55.7%; ▌ W. A. Overby (Republican) 44.3%
Kentucky 3	John S. Rhea	Democratic	1896	Incumbent retired. Democratic hold.	▌ ✓ James M. Richardson (Democratic) 50.1%; ▌ W. H. Jones (Republican) 49.9%
Kentucky 4	David Highbaugh Smith	Democratic	1896	Incumbent re-elected.	▌ ✓ David Highbaugh Smith (Democratic) 53.1%; ▌ Ben L. Bruner (Republican) 46.9%
Kentucky 5	J. Swagar Sherley	Democratic	1902	Incumbent re-elected.	▌ ✓ J. Swagar Sherley (Democratic) 51.0%; ▌ William Claiborne Owens (Republican) 47.8%; ▌ J. M. Tyding (Prohibition) 0.8%; ▌ Albert Schmutz (Socialist) 0.4%
Kentucky 6	Daniel Linn Gooch	Democratic	1900	Incumbent lost renomination. Democratic hold.	▌ ✓ Joseph L. Rhinock (Democratic) 50.7%; ▌ Leslie T. Applegate (Republican) 43.3%; ▌ R. A. Miller (Socialist) 4.9%; ▌ C. J. Bagley (Prohibition) 1.1%
Kentucky 7	South Trimble	Democratic	1900	Incumbent re-elected.	▌ ✓ South Trimble (Democratic) 60.0%; ▌ Joseph W. Calvert (Republican) 38.9%; ▌ E. Snodgrass (Prohibition) 1.1%
Kentucky 8	George G. Gilbert	Democratic	1898	Incumbent re-elected.	▌ ✓ George G. Gilbert (Democratic) 52.4%; ▌ N. D. Miles (Republican) 46.2%; ▌ A. W. Carpenter (Prohibition) 1.4%
Kentucky 9	James N. Kehoe	Democratic	1900	Incumbent lost re-election. Republican gain.	▌ ✓ Joseph B. Bennett (Republican) 50.1%; ▌ James N. Kehoe (Democratic) 50.0%
Kentucky 10	Francis A. Hopkins	Democratic	1902	Incumbent re-elected.	▌ ✓ Francis A. Hopkins (Democratic) 51.9%; ▌ Theodore T. Blakey (Republican) 48.1%
Kentucky 11	W. Godfrey Hunter	Republican	1903	Incumbent retired. Republican hold.	▌ ✓ Don C. Edwards (Republican) 70.3%; ▌ George E. Stone (Democratic) 29.6%; ▌ W. S. Stone (Prohibition) 0.1%

== Louisiana ==
District	Incumbent			This race	
District	Member	Party	First elected	Results	Candidates
Louisiana 1	Adolph Meyer	Democratic	1890	Incumbent re-elected.	▌ ✓ Adolph Meyer (Democratic) 89.8%; ▌Hugh S. Sutton (Republican) 7.8%; ▌John R. Hoy (Socialist) 2.4%
Louisiana 2	Robert C. Davey	Democratic	1892; 1896	Incumbent re-elected.	▌ ✓ Robert C. Davey (Democratic) 91.0%; ▌George H. Venneard (Republican) 7.4%; ▌C. A. Eastman (Socialist) 1.6%
Louisiana 3	Robert F. Broussard	Democratic	1896	Incumbent re-elected.	▌ ✓ Robert F. Broussard (Democratic) 84.5%; ▌Henry N. Pharr (Republican) 15.52%
Louisiana 4	Phanor Breazeale	Democratic	1898	Incumbent lost renomination. Democratic hold.	▌ ✓ John T. Watkins (Democratic) 99.1%
Louisiana 5	Joseph E. Ransdell	Democratic	1899 (special)	Incumbent re-elected.	▌ ✓ Joseph E. Ransdell (Democratic) 95.4%; ▌H. B. Taliaferro, Sr. (Republican) 4.6%
Louisiana 6	Samuel M. Robertson	Democratic	1887 (special)	Incumbent re-elected.	▌ ✓ Samuel M. Robertson (Democratic) 88.1%; ▌L. E. Bentley (Republican) 11.9%
Louisiana 7	Arsène Pujo	Democratic	1902	Incumbent re-elected.	▌ ✓ Arsène Pujo (Democratic) 84.2%; ▌Joseph Lassalle (Republican) 15.6%

== Maine ==
District	Incumbent			This race	
District	Member	Party	First elected	Results	Candidates
Maine 1	Amos L. Allen	Republican	1899	Incumbent re-elected.	▌ ✓ Amos L. Allen (Republican) 57.2%; ▌ Luther R. Moore (Democratic) 41.6%; ▌ P. R. Moore (Socialist) 1.2%
Maine 2	Charles E. Littlefield	Republican	1899	Incumbent re-elected	▌ ✓ Charles E. Littlefield (Republican) 57.2%; ▌ Horatio G. Foss (Democratic) 41.2%; ▌ C. E. Waterman (Socialist) 1.6%
Maine 3	Edwin C. Burleigh	Republican	1897	Incumbent re-elected.	▌ ✓ Edwin C. Burleigh (Republican) 60.3%; ▌ E. N. Benson (Democratic) 38.0%; ▌ R. H. Townsend (Socialist) 1.7%
Maine 4	Llewellyn Powers	Republican	1901	Incumbent re-elected.	▌ ✓ Llewellyn Powers (Republican) 62.4%; ▌ William Robinson Pattangall (Democratic) 35.3%; ▌ Volney B. Cushing (Prohibition) 2.3%

== Maryland ==
District	Incumbent			This race	
District	Member	Party	First elected	Results	Candidates
Maryland 1	William H. Jackson	Republican	1900	Incumbent lost re-election. Democratic gain.	▌ ✓ Thomas Alexander Smith (Democratic) 49.4%; ▌William H. Jackson (Republican) 48.0%; ▌N. E. Clark (Prohibition) 2.6%
Maryland 2	J. Frederick C. Talbott	Democratic	1902	Incumbent re-elected.	▌ ✓ J. Frederick C. Talbott (Democratic) 52.2%; ▌Robert Garrett (Republican) 46.2%; ▌P. G. Spencer (Prohibition) 1.6%
Maryland 3	Frank C. Wachter	Republican	1898	Incumbent re-elected.	▌ ✓ Frank C. Wachter (Republican) 51.8%; ▌Lee S. Meyer (Democratic) 45.8%; ▌Levin T. Jones (Socialist) 1.6%; ▌S. H. Roberts (Prohibition) 0.8%
Maryland 4	James W. Denny	Democratic	1902	Incumbent retired. Democratic hold.	▌ ✓ John Gill Jr. (Democratic) 51.8%; ▌William C. Smith (Republican) 47.0%; ▌George E. McLaughlin (Prohibition) 1.2%
Maryland 5	Sydney E. Mudd I	Republican	1896	Incumbent re-elected.	▌ ✓ Sydney E. Mudd I (Republican) 53.6%; ▌Richard S. Hill (Democratic) 43.6%; ▌William E. Johnsen (Prohibition) 1.4%; ▌John E. Mudd (Independent Republican) 1.4%
Maryland 6	George A. Pearre	Republican	1898	Incumbent re-elected.	▌ ✓ George A. Pearre (Republican) 53.9%; ▌Walter A. Johnston (Democratic) 42.5%; ▌William A. Michaels (Prohibition) 2.1%; ▌S. L. V. Young (Socialist) 1.5%

== Massachusetts ==
District	Incumbent			This race	
District	Member	Party	First elected	Results	Candidates
Massachusetts 1	George P. Lawrence	Republican	1897 (special)	Incumbent re-elected.	▌ ✓ George P. Lawrence (Republican) 58.0%; ▌Charles Giddings (Democratic) 37.4%; ▌Theodore Koehler (Socialist) 3.0%; ▌John Kilbon (Prohibition) 1.5%
Massachusetts 2	Frederick H. Gillett	Republican	1892	Incumbent re-elected.	▌ ✓ Frederick H. Gillett (Republican) 63.5%; ▌George W. Wheelwright Jr. (Democratic) 28.8%; ▌George H. Wrenn (Socialist) 6.3%; ▌Alfred E. Steele (Prohibition) 1.4%
Massachusetts 3	John R. Thayer	Democratic	1898	Incumbent retired. Republican gain.	▌ ✓ Rockwood Hoar (Republican) 61.1%; ▌John B. Ratigan (Democratic) 36.4%; ▌John W. Brown (Socialist) 2.5%
Massachusetts 4	Charles Q. Tirrell	Republican	1900	Incumbent re-elected.	▌ ✓ Charles Q. Tirrell (Republican) 61.4%; ▌Marcus A. Coolidge (Democratic) 33.9%; ▌John F. Mullen (Socialist) 4.6%
Massachusetts 5	Butler Ames	Republican	1902	Incumbent re-elected.	▌ ✓ Butler Ames (Republican) 54.6%; ▌Alexander B. Bruce (Democratic) 42.5%; ▌Winfield F. Parker (Socialist) 2.9%
Massachusetts 6	Augustus P. Gardner	Republican	1902 (special)	Incumbent re-elected.	▌ ✓ Augustus P. Gardner (Republican) 61.0%; ▌Daniel N. Crowley (Democratic) 29.8%; ▌James F. Carey (Socialist) 9.1%
Massachusetts 7	Ernest W. Roberts	Republican	1898	Incumbent re-elected.	▌ ✓ Ernest W. Roberts (Republican) 62.9%; ▌William A. Kelley (Democratic) 30.7%; ▌Andrew A. Keene (Socialist) 3.3%; ▌Fred P. Greenwood (Prohibition) 1.7%; ▌James Goodwin (Socialist Labor) 1.4%
Massachusetts 8	Samuel W. McCall	Republican	1892	Incumbent re-elected.	▌ ✓ Samuel W. McCall (Republican) 89.1%; ▌Thomas A. Scott (Socialist) 10.9%
Massachusetts 9	John A. Keliher	Democratic	1902	Incumbent re-elected.	▌ ✓ John A. Keliher (Democratic) 67.7%; ▌Walter L. Sears (Republican) 27.4%; ▌James J. McVey (Socialist) 4.9%
Massachusetts 10	William S. McNary	Democratic	1902	Incumbent re-elected.	▌ ✓ William S. McNary (Democratic) 57.3%; ▌Jay B. Crawford (Republican) 38.0%; ▌William T. Richards (Socialist) 4.7%
Massachusetts 11	John Andrew Sullivan	Democratic	1902	Incumbent re-elected.	▌ ✓ John Andrew Sullivan (Democratic) 51.6%; ▌Eugene Foss (Republican) 45.7%; ▌George G. Cutting (Socialist) 2.4%; ▌Marion W. Addison (Ind. Democratic) 0.3%
Massachusetts 12	Samuel L. Powers	Republican	1900	Incumbent retired. Republican hold.	▌ ✓ John W. Weeks (Republican) 61.3%; ▌Augustus Hemenway (Democratic) 34.3%; ▌George E. Littlefield (Socialist) 4.4%
Massachusetts 13	William S. Greene	Republican	1898 (special)	Incumbent re-elected.	▌ ✓ William S. Greene (Republican) 62.8%; ▌Francis M. Kennedy (Democratic) 37.2%
Massachusetts 14	William C. Lovering	Republican	1896	Incumbent re-elected.	▌ ✓ William C. Lovering (Republican) 60.4%; ▌Thomas H. Buttimer (Democratic) 23.3%; ▌Charles H. Coulter (Socialist) 14.0%; ▌Sherman E. Ellis (Prohibition) 2.3%

== Michigan ==
District	Incumbent			This race	
District	Member	Party	First elected	Results	Candidates
Michigan 1	Alfred Lucking	Democratic	1902	Incumbent lost re-election. Republican gain.	▌ ✓ Edwin Denby (Republican) 58.0%; ▌ Alfred Lucking (Democratic) 41.2%; ▌ Phil Engel (Socialist) 0.6%; ▌ Benjamin Lapate (Socialist Labor) 0.2%
Michigan 2	Charles E. Townsend	Republican	1902	Incumbent re-elected.	▌ ✓ Charles E. Townsend (Republican) 59.2%; ▌ John P. Kirk (Democratic) 38.8%; ▌ Jacob Baker (Prohibition) 2.0%
Michigan 3	Washington Gardner	Republican	1898	Incumbent re-elected.	▌ ✓ Washington Gardner (Republican) 63.4%; ▌ Lloyd C. Feighner (Democratic) 30.6%; ▌ W. A. Taylor (Prohibition) 3.4%; ▌ J. R. D. Snyder (Socialist) 2.6%
Michigan 4	Edward L. Hamilton	Republican	1896	Incumbent re-elected.	▌ ✓ Edward L. Hamilton (Republican) 66.5%; ▌ Theodore G. Beaver (Democratic) 33.5%
Michigan 5	William Alden Smith	Republican	1894	Incumbent re-elected.	▌ ✓ William Alden Smith (Republican) 70.3%; ▌ Vernon H. Smith (Democratic) 27.9%; ▌ W. A. Klazier (Prohibition) 1.8%
Michigan 6	Samuel W. Smith	Republican	1896	Incumbent re-elected.	▌ ✓ Samuel W. Smith (Republican) 61.4%; ▌ Charles A. Durand (Democratic) 35.6%; ▌ J. R. Potter (Prohibition) 1.7%; ▌ J. H. McFarlan Socialist) 1.3%
Michigan 7	Henry McMorran	Republican	1902	Incumbent re-elected.	▌ ✓ Henry McMorran (Republican) 66.4%; ▌ Charles Wellman (Democratic) 32.8%; ▌ J. M. Lamb (Prohibition) 0.8%
Michigan 8	Joseph W. Fordney	Republican	1898	Incumbent re-elected.	▌ ✓ Joseph W. Fordney (Republican) 65.2%; ▌ Henry J. Patterson (Democratic) 31.8%
Michigan 9	Roswell P. Bishop	Republican	1894	Incumbent re-elected.	▌ ✓ Roswell P. Bishop (Republican) 71.5%; ▌ George S. Stanley (Democratic) 22.4%; ▌ H. S. Mills (Prohibition) 3.4%; ▌ G. R. Kinsman Socialist) 2.7%
Michigan 10	George A. Loud	Republican	1902	Incumbent re-elected.	▌ ✓ George A. Loud (Republican) 70.4%; ▌ Stephen P. Flynn (Democratic) 27.3%; ▌ C. L. Smith (Prohibition) 2.3%
Michigan 11	Archibald B. Darragh	Republican	1900	Incumbent re-elected.	▌ ✓ Archibald B. Darragh (Republican) 73.0%; ▌ William A. Bahlke (Democratic) 24.5%; ▌ Henry A. Miller (Prohibition) 2.5%
Michigan 12	H. Olin Young	Republican	1902	Incumbent re-elected.	▌ ✓ H. Olin Young (Republican) 80.3%; ▌ John W. Black (Democratic) 17.3%; ▌ H. D. Hatch (Prohibition) 2.4%

== Minnesota ==
District	Incumbent			This race	
District	Member	Party	First elected	Results	Candidates
Minnesota 1	James A. Tawney	Republican	1892	Incumbent re-elected.	▌ ✓ James A. Tawney (Republican) 64.5%; ▌Hans C. Nelson (Democratic) 35.5%
Minnesota 2	James McCleary	Republican	1892	Incumbent re-elected.	▌ ✓ James McCleary (Republican) 64.1%; ▌George Philip Jones (Democratic) 35.9%
Minnesota 3	Charles Russell Davis	Republican	1894	Incumbent re-elected.	▌ ✓ Charles Russell Davis (Republican) 66.0%; ▌Joseph W. Craven (Democratic) 34.1%
Minnesota 4	Frederick Stevens	Republican	1896	Incumbent re-elected.	▌ ✓ Frederick Stevens (Republican) 100%
Minnesota 5	John Lind	Democratic	1886; 1892 (retired); 1902	Incumbent retired. Republican gain.	▌ ✓ Loren Fletcher (Republican) 51.3%; ▌Christian H. Kohler (Democratic) 37.2%; ▌Adolph Hirschfield (Public Ownership) 7.4%; ▌Joseph H. Morton (Prohibition) 4.1%
Minnesota 6	Clarence Buckman	Republican	1902	Incumbent re-elected.	▌ ✓ Clarence Buckman (Republican) 54.0%; ▌Cleve W. Van Dyke (Democratic) 46.0%
Minnesota 7	Andrew Volstead	Republican	1902	Incumbent re-elected.	▌ ✓ Andrew Volstead (Republican) 98.7%; ▌John H. Driscoll (Democratic write-in) 1.2% (Note: Driscoll did not pay the filing fee, and did not appear on the ballot.)
Minnesota 8	J. Adam Bede	Republican	1902	Incumbent re-elected.	▌ ✓ J. Adam Bede (Republican) 76.1%; ▌Martin Hughes (Democratic) 22.8%; ▌John A. O'Malley (Public Ownership) 1.1%
Minnesota 9	Halvor Steenerson	Republican	1902	Incumbent re-elected.	▌ ✓ Halvor Steenerson (Republican) 100%

== Mississippi ==
District	Incumbent			This race	
District	Member	Party	First elected	Results	Candidates
Mississippi 1	Ezekiel S. Candler Jr.	Democratic	1900	Incumbent re-elected.	▌ ✓ Ezekiel S. Candler Jr. (Democratic) 100%
Mississippi 2	Thomas Spight	Democratic	1898 (special)	Incumbent re-elected.	▌ ✓ Thomas Spight (Democratic) 100%
Mississippi 3	Benjamin G. Humphreys II	Democratic	1902	Incumbent re-elected.	▌ ✓ Benjamin G. Humphreys II (Democratic) 100%
Mississippi 4	Wilson S. Hill	Democratic	1902	Incumbent re-elected.	▌ ✓ Wilson S. Hill (Democratic) 100%
Mississippi 5	Adam M. Byrd	Democratic	1902	Incumbent re-elected.	▌ ✓ Adam M. Byrd (Democratic) 99.04%; ▌J. C. Hill (Republican) 0.96%
Mississippi 6	Eaton J. Bowers	Democratic	1902	Incumbent re-elected.	▌ ✓ Eaton J. Bowers (Democratic) 93.60%; ▌C. W. Bayliss (Socialist) 6.40%
Mississippi 7	Frank A. McLain	Democratic	1898 (special)	Incumbent re-elected.	▌ ✓ Frank A. McLain (Democratic) 100%
Mississippi 8	John S. Williams	Democratic	1892	Incumbent re-elected.	▌ ✓ John S. Williams (Democratic) 100%

== Missouri ==
District	Incumbent			This race	
District	Member	Party	First elected	Results	Candidates
Missouri 1	James T. Lloyd	Democratic	1897	Incumbent re-elected.	▌ ✓ James T. Lloyd (Democratic) 51.4%; ▌ Edward E. Higbee (Republican) 48.6%
Missouri 2	William W. Rucker	Democratic	1898	Incumbent re-elected.	▌ ✓ William W. Rucker (Democratic) 53.8%; ▌ Fred S. Hudson (Republican) 46.2%
Missouri 3	John Dougherty	Democratic	1898	Incumbent lost renomination. Republican gain.	▌ ✓ Frank B. Klepper (Republican) 50.4%; ▌ James W. Sullinger (Democratic) 49.6%
Missouri 4	Charles F. Cochran	Democratic	1896	Incumbent retired. Republican gain.	▌ ✓ Frank B. Fulkerson (Republican) 51.7%; ▌ Francis M. Wilson (Democratic) 48.3%
Missouri 5	William S. Cowherd	Democratic	1896	Incumbent lost re-election. Republican gain.	▌ ✓ Edgar C. Ellis (Republican) 49.2%; ▌ William S. Cowherd (Democratic) 47.2%; ▌ T. F. Croal (Socialist) 2.6%; ▌ L. A. Copley (Prohibition) 0.7%; ▌ J. D. Brown (Populist) 0.3%
Missouri 6	David A. De Armond	Democratic	1890	Incumbent re-elected.	▌ ✓ David A. De Armond (Democratic) 51.5%; ▌ J. Fred Rhodes (Republican) 48.5%
Missouri 7	Courtney W. Hamlin	Democratic	1902	Incumbent lost re-election. Republican gain.	▌ ✓ John Welborn (Republican) 51.6%; ▌ Courtney W. Hamlin (Democratic) 48.4%
Missouri 8	Dorsey W. Shackleford	Democratic	1899	Incumbent re-elected.	▌ ✓ Dorsey W. Shackleford (Democratic) 51.6%; ▌ Henry W. Chalfant (Republican) 48.5%
Missouri 9	Champ Clark	Democratic	1896	Incumbent re-elected.	▌ ✓ Champ Clark (Democratic) 51.9%; ▌ J. B. Garber (Republican) 48.1%
Missouri 10	Richard Bartholdt	Republican	1892	Incumbent re-elected.	▌ ✓ Richard Bartholdt (Republican) 58.5%; ▌ Louis J. Tichacek (Democratic) 36.3%; ▌ G. A. Hoehn (Socialist) 4.8%; ▌ Carl Unsheln (Socialist Labor) 0.4%
Missouri 11	John T. Hunt	Democratic	1902	Incumbent re-elected.	▌ ✓ John T. Hunt (Democratic) 49.1%; ▌ Henry S. Caulfield (Republican) 47.1%; ▌ W. W. Baker (Socialist) 3.4%; ▌ J. J. Ernst (Socialist Labor) 0.4%
Missouri 12	James Joseph Butler	Democratic	1900	Incumbent retired. Democratic hold.	▌ ✓ Ernest E. Wood (Democratic) 50.3%; ▌ Harry M. Coudrey (Republican) 47.1%; ▌ William Crouch (Socialist) 2.4%; ▌ Morris Biell (Socialist Labor) 0.2%
Missouri 12	James Joseph Butler	Democratic	1900	Election successfully contested. New member seated June 23, 1906. Republican gain.	▌ ✓ Harry M. Coudrey (Republican); ▌ Ernest E. Wood (Democratic)
Missouri 13	Edward Robb	Democratic	1896	Incumbent lost re-election. Republican gain.	▌ ✓ Harry M. Coudrey (Republican) 50.6%; ▌ Edward Robb (Democratic) 49.4%
Missouri 14	Willard Duncan Vandiver	Democratic	1896	Incumbent retired. Republican gain.	▌ ✓ William T. Tyndall (Republican) 52.8%; ▌ Joseph J. Russell (Democratic) 47.1%
Missouri 15	Maecenas E. Benton	Democratic	1896	Incumbent lost re-election. Republican gain.	▌ ✓ Cassius M. Shartel (Republican) 49.0%; ▌ Maecenas E. Benton (Democratic) 44.4%; ▌ P. H. Callery (Socialist) 4.6%; ▌ W. H. Dalton (Prohibition) 2.0%
Missouri 16	J. Robert Lamar	Democratic	1902	Incumbent lost re-election. Republican gain.	▌ ✓ Arthur P. Murphy (Republican) 50.1%; ▌ J. Robert Lamar (Democratic) 49.9%

== Montana ==
District	Incumbent			This race	
District	Member	Party	First elected	Results	Candidates
Montana at-large	Joseph M. Dixon	Republican	1902	Incumbent re-elected.	▌ ✓ Joseph M. Dixon (Republican) 51.73%; ▌Austin C. Gormley (Democratic) 41.95%; ▌John H. Walsh (Socialist) 6.32%

== Nebraska ==
District	Incumbent			This race	
District	Member	Party	First elected	Results	Candidates
Nebraska 1	Elmer Burkett	Republican	1898	Incumbent re-elected. Resigned before start of term to become Senator.	▌ ✓ Elmer Burkett (Republican) 59.71%; ▌Hugh Lamaster (Democratic/Populist) 35.80%; ▌Bert Wilson (Prohibition) 3.16%; ▌A. L. Schiermeter (Socialist) 1.34%
Nebraska 2	Gilbert Hitchcock	Democratic	1902	Incumbent lost re-election. Republican gain.	▌ ✓ John L. Kennedy (Republican) 46.78%; ▌Gilbert Hitchcock (Democratic/Populist) 44.22%; ▌Clark W. Adair (Socialist) 8.22%; ▌Richard N. Throckmorton (Prohibition) 0.78%
Nebraska 3	John McCarthy	Republican	1902	Incumbent re-elected.	▌ ✓ John McCarthy (Republican) 51.94%; ▌Patrick E. McKillip (Democratic/Populist) 45.62%; ▌H. J. Hockenburger (Prohibition) 2.44%
Nebraska 4	Edmund H. Hinshaw	Republican	1902	Incumbent re-elected.	▌ ✓ Edmund H. Hinshaw (Republican) 57.90%; ▌Charles F. Gilbert (Democratic/Populist) 38.84%; ▌George I. Wright (Prohibition) 3.27%
Nebraska 5	George W. Norris	Republican	1902	Incumbent re-elected.	▌ ✓ George W. Norris (Republican) 56.11%; ▌Harry H. Mauck (Democratic/Populist) 39.51%; ▌John Tucker (Prohibition) 2.83%; ▌William Stolley (Socialist) 1.55%
Nebraska 6	Moses Kinkaid	Republican	1902	Incumbent re-elected.	▌ ✓ Moses Kinkaid (Republican) 58.82%; ▌Walter B. McNeel (Democratic/Populist) 35.76%; ▌John J. Smith (Prohibition) 2.88%; ▌Lucien Stebbins (Socialist) 2.54%

== Nevada ==
District	Incumbent			This race	
District	Member	Party	First elected	Results	Candidates
Nevada at-large	Clarence D. Van Duzer	Democratic	1902	Incumbent re-elected.	▌ ✓ Clarence D. Van Duzer (Democratic/Silver) 48.5%; ▌ James A. Yerington (Republican) 46.5%; ▌ Reinhold Sadler (Stalwart Silver) 5.0%

== New Hampshire ==
District	Incumbent			This race	
District	Member	Party	First elected	Results	Candidates
New Hampshire 1	Cyrus A. Sulloway	Republican	1894	Incumbent re-elected.	▌ ✓ Cyrus A. Sulloway (Republican) 58.9%; ▌ Napoleon J. Dyer (Democratic) 39.1%; ▌ G. A. Little (Socialist) 1.1%; ▌ Harry J. Rhodes (Prohibition) 0.9%
New Hampshire 2	Frank D. Currier	Republican	1900	Incumbent re-elected.	▌ ✓ Frank D. Currier (Republican) 60.7%; ▌ Harry W. Daniel (Democratic) 37.4%; ▌ H. D. Nourse (Socialist) 1.1%; ▌ Luke F. Richardson (Prohibition) 0.8%

== New Jersey ==
District	Incumbent			This race	
District	Member	Party	First elected	Results	Candidates
New Jersey 1	Henry C. Loudenslager	Republican	1892	Incumbent re-elected.	▌ ✓ Henry C. Loudenslager (Republican) 60.3%; ▌ A. H. Swackhammer (Democratic) 35.4%; ▌ G. W. Powell (Prohibition) 2.7%; ▌ F. M. Wittman (Socialist) 1.0%; ▌ J. T. Wright (Populist) 0.5%; ▌ E. Romary (Socialist Labor) 0.1%
New Jersey 2	John J. Gardner	Republican	1892	Incumbent re-elected.	▌ ✓ John J. Gardner (Republican) 63.7%; ▌ Samuel E. Perry (Democratic) 31.6%; ▌ Thomas H. Landon (Prohibition) 3.4%; ▌ Robert W. Buckley (Socialist) 0.8%; ▌ Marion R. Owen (Populist) 0.5%
New Jersey 3	Benjamin F. Howell	Republican	1894	Incumbent re-elected.	▌ ✓ Benjamin F. Howell (Republican) 56.1%; ▌ J. E. Otis (Democratic) 40.8%; ▌ E. C. Brown (Prohibition) 1.7%; ▌ W. LaBow (Populist) 0.6%; ▌ N. Rippen (Socialist) 0.5%; ▌ C. H. Sporie (Socialist Labor) 0.3%
New Jersey 4	William M. Lanning	Republican	1902	Incumbent resigned on appointment as district judge of 3rd circuit. Winner also elected to finish term. Republican hold.	▌ ✓ Ira W. Wood (Republican) 54.7%; ▌ Robert L. Stevens (Democratic) 41.1%; ▌ L. Brown (Prohibition) 1.9%
New Jersey 5	Charles N. Fowler	Republican	1894	Incumbent re-elected.	▌ ✓ Charles N. Fowler (Republican) 52.3%; ▌ James E. Martine (Democratic) 41.1%; ▌ F. P. Lefferts (Prohibition) 2.5%; ▌ T. W. Roff (Socialist) 2.3%; ▌ E. E. Potter (Populist) 1.1%; ▌ J. Fruth (Socialist Labor) 0.7%
New Jersey 6	William Hughes	Democratic	1902	Incumbent lost re-election. Republican gain.	▌ ✓ Henry C. Allen (Republican) 47.8%; ▌ William Hughes (Democratic) 46.9%; ▌ W. H. Wyatt (Socialist) 2.3%; ▌ J. T. Greenfel (Prohibition) 1.2%; ▌ C. L. Tidabeck (Populist) 1.0%; ▌ J. C. Butterworth (Socialist Labor) 0.8%
New Jersey 7	Richard W. Parker	Republican	1894	Incumbent re-elected.	▌ ✓ Richard W. Parker (Republican) 61.4%; ▌ Percy Jackson (Democratic) 34.5%; ▌ J. E. Billings (Socialist) 1.9%; ▌ G. L. Rusby (Populist) 1.0%; ▌ H. E. Greengrass (Prohibition) 0.7%; ▌ C. Burgholz (Socialist Labor) 0.5%
New Jersey 8	William H. Wiley	Republican	1902	Incumbent re-elected.	▌ ✓ William H. Wiley (Republican) 63.2%; ▌ Frederick Seymour (Democratic) 30.4%; ▌ J. W. James (Socialist) 4.2%; ▌ E. Pomeroy (Populist) 1.1%; ▌ J. Maddeck (Socialist Labor) 1.1%
New Jersey 9	Allan Benny	Democratic	1902	Incumbent lost re-election. Republican gain.	▌ ✓ Marshall Van Winkle (Republican) 50.7%; ▌ Allan Benny (Democratic) 44.5%; ▌ G. H. Headley (Socialist) 3.0%; ▌ Samuel Wilson (Prohibition) 0.6%; ▌ A. M. Gray (Populist) 0.6%; ▌ C. E. Henschaft (Socialist Labor) 0.6%
New Jersey 10	Allan L. McDermott	Democratic	1900	Incumbent re-elected.	▌ ✓ Allan L. McDermott (Democratic) 53.8%; ▌ Herman Walker (Republican) 40.3%; ▌ Charles Ufert (Socialist) 3.7%; ▌ E. Gilmore (Socialist Labor) 1.0%; ▌ D. T. Dwyer (Populist) 0.8%; ▌ G. Law (Prohibition) 0.4%

== New York ==
District	Incumbent			This race	
District	Member	Party	First elected	Results	Candidates
New York 1	Townsend Scudder	Democratic	1902	Incumbent retired. Republican gain.	▌ ✓ William W. Cocks (Republican) 55.7%; ▌ William Willett Jr. (Democratic) 42.3%; ▌ William A. Simons (Prohibition) 1.1%; ▌ John Connell (Social Democratic) 0.9%
New York 2	George H. Lindsay	Democratic	1900	Incumbent re-elected.	▌ ✓ George H. Lindsay (Democratic) 55.8%; ▌ Herbert J. Knapp (Republican) 38.9%; ▌ George Stammer (Social Democratic) 4.5%; ▌ Emil F. Wegener (Socialist Labor) 0.8%
New York 3	Charles T. Dunwell	Republican	1902	Incumbent re-elected.	▌ ✓ Charles T. Dunwell (Republican) 52.6%; ▌ Ephraim Byk (Democratic) 43.5%; ▌ Mark Peiser (Social Democratic) 3.3%; ▌ Henry Kober (Socialist Labor) 0.6%
New York 4	Frank E. Wilson	Democratic	1898	Incumbent lost re-election. Republican gain.	▌ ✓ Charles B. Law (Republican) 49.4%; ▌ Frank E. Wilson (Democratic) 45.0%; ▌ William Koenig (Social Democratic) 5.0%; ▌ Henry Kuhn (Socialist Labor) 0.6%
New York 5	Edward Bassett	Democratic	1902	Incumbent retired. Republican gain.	▌ ✓ George E. Waldo (Republican) 51.8%; ▌ John J. Roach (Democratic) 45.9%; ▌ Cortes W. Cavanagh (Social Democratic) 1.8%; ▌ John Hall (Socialist Labor) 0.5%
New York 6	Robert Baker	Democratic	1902	Incumbent lost re-election. Republican gain.	▌ ✓ William M. Calder (Republican) 52.4%; ▌ Robert Baker (Democratic) 46.0%; ▌ Alexander Fraser (Social Democratic) 1.2%; ▌ Stephen J. Mummery (Socialist Labor) 0.4%
New York 7	John J. Fitzgerald	Democratic	1898	Incumbent re-elected.	▌ ✓ John J. Fitzgerald (Democratic) 62.6%; ▌ Robert H. Haskell (Republican) 35.4%; ▌ William A. Schmidt (Social Democratic) 1.5%; ▌ Joseph Condon (Socialist Labor) 0.5%
New York 8	Timothy Sullivan	Democratic	1902	Incumbent re-elected.	▌ ✓ Timothy Sullivan (Democratic) 61.5%; ▌ Frank L. Frugone (Republican) 35.7%; ▌ Phillip Vogel (Social Democratic) 2.2%; ▌ Robert Downs (Socialist Labor) 0.6%; ▌ Andrew J. Doremus (Prohibition) 0.1%
New York 9	Henry M. Goldfogle	Democratic	1900	Incumbent re-elected.	▌ ✓ Henry M. Goldfogle (Democratic) 39.7%; ▌ Joseph A. Levenson (Republican) 37.7%; ▌ Joseph Barondess (Social Democratic) 21.0%; ▌ Joseph Schlossberg (Socialist Labor) 1.3%; ▌ Lynn D. Brown (Prohibition) 0.3%
New York 10	William Sulzer	Democratic	1894	Incumbent re-elected.	▌ ✓ William Sulzer (Democratic) 51.0%; ▌ William Byrnes (Republican) 35.8%; ▌ Isidore Phillips (Social Democratic) 10.6%; ▌ James T. Hunter (Socialist Labor) 2.0%; ▌ William Lushcartner (Populist) 0.4%; ▌ Robert E. Neidig (Prohibition) 0.2%
New York 11	William Randolph Hearst	Democratic	1902	Incumbent re-elected.	▌ ✓ William Randolph Hearst (Democratic) 59.3%; ▌ Henry C. Piercy (Republican) 37.5%; ▌ H. Gaylord Wilshire (Social Democratic) 2.1%; ▌ Edward J. Boyce (Socialist Labor) 0.8%; ▌ James K. Moore (Prohibition) 0.3%
New York 12	William Bourke Cockran	Democratic	1904	Incumbent re-elected.	▌ ✓ William Bourke Cockran (Democratic) 63.1%; ▌ Henry Carey (Republican) 31.6%; ▌ Fred Paulitsch (Social Democratic) 4.2%; ▌ Olof Sherrane (Socialist Labor) 1.0%; ▌ Fred A. Loomis (Prohibition) 0.1%
New York 13	Francis Burton Harrison	Democratic	1902	Incumbent retired to run for Lieutenant Governor of New York. Republican gain.	▌ ✓ Herbert Parsons (Republican) 52.9%; ▌ Edward Swann (Democratic) 45.4%; ▌ John Mullen (Social Democratic) 1.2%; ▌ Samuel Winauer (Socialist Labor) 0.3%; ▌ Carl Grinskald (Prohibition) 0.2%
New York 14	Ira E. Rider	Democratic	1902	Incumbent retired. Democratic hold.	▌ ✓ Charles A. Towne (Democratic) 57.1%; ▌ Lucian Knapp (Republican) 33.4%; ▌ William Ehret (Social Democratic) 7.8%; ▌ Lewis Neuman (Socialist Labor) 1.0%; ▌ Peter A. Leininger (Populist) 0.6%; ▌ Albert Wadhams (Prohibition) 0.1%
New York 15	William H. Douglas	Republican	1900	Incumbent retired. Republican hold.	▌ ✓ J. Van Vechten Olcott (Republican) 51.7%; ▌ M. Francis Loughman (Democratic) 46.4%; ▌ Edwin J. Lewis (Social Democratic) 1.4%; ▌ John J. Kinneally (Socialist Labor) 0.4%; ▌ A. Worrall Palmer (Prohibition) 0.1%
New York 16	Jacob Ruppert	Democratic	1898	Incumbent re-elected.	▌ ✓ Jacob Ruppert (Democratic) 52.7%; ▌ Theodore Prince (Republican) 39.3%; ▌ Adolph Groelinger (Social Democratic) 6.6%; ▌ Daniel H. Graney (Socialist Labor) 1.3%; ▌ W. Henry Draper (Prohibition) 0.2%
New York 17	Francis Emanuel Shober	Democratic	1902	Incumbent lost renomination. Republican gain.	▌ ✓ William Stiles Bennet (Republican) 51.3%; ▌ Franklin Leonard (Democratic) 46.0%; ▌ Edward F. Cassidy (Social Democratic) 2.0%; ▌ Edward N. Zolinsky (Socialist Labor) 0.5%; ▌ William A. Layton (Prohibition) 0.2%
New York 18	Joseph A. Goulden	Democratic	1902	Incumbent re-elected.	▌ ✓ Joseph A. Goulden (Democratic) 57.2%; ▌ William W. Niles (Republican) 36.5%; ▌ Gustave Dressier (Social Democratic) 4.7%; ▌ August Gillhaus (Socialist Labor) 1.4%; ▌ James H. Hardy (Prohibition) 0.2%
New York 19	Norton P. Otis	Republican	1902	Incumbent died. Republican hold.	▌ ✓ John Emory Andrus (Republican) 54.1%; ▌ J. Harvey Bell (Democratic) 42.7%; ▌ Alfred E. Dixon (Social Democratic) 1.8%; ▌ H. Redforn Smith (Socialist Labor) 0.7%; ▌ Richard W. Gaffney (Prohibition) 0.7%
New York 20	Thomas W. Bradley	Republican	1902	Incumbent re-elected.	▌ ✓ Thomas W. Bradley (Republican) 55.5%; ▌ Charles G. Dill (Democratic) 42.0%; ▌ Charles BeVier (Prohibition) 1.2%; ▌ John Hall (Social Democratic) 0.9%; ▌ Edward A. Gidley (Socialist Labor) 0.4%
New York 21	John H. Ketcham	Republican	1896	Incumbent re-elected.	▌ ✓ John H. Ketcham (Republican) 95.9%; ▌ Walter F. Taber (Prohibition) 2.6%; ▌ Andrew C. Fancher (Social Democratic) 1.5%
New York 22	William H. Draper	Republican	1900	Incumbent re-elected.	▌ ✓ William H. Draper (Republican) 59.4%; ▌ Isaac C. Blandy (Democratic) 37.5%; ▌ Edwin Bell (Prohibition) 1.6%; ▌ Alvin Page (Social Democratic) 1.1%; ▌ Patrick E. DeLee (Socialist Labor) 0.4%
New York 23	George N. Southwick	Republican	1900	Incumbent re-elected.	▌ ✓ George N. Southwick (Republican) 55.7%; ▌ Daniel C. McElwain (Democratic) 42.3%; ▌ Russell E. Hunt (Social Democratic) 1.5%; ▌ Henry Kruse (Socialist Labor) 0.5%
New York 24	George J. Smith	Republican	1902	Incumbent retired. Republican hold.	▌ ✓ Frank J. LeFevre (Republican) 95.5%; ▌ George W. Ostrander (Prohibition) 4.5%
New York 25	Lucius Littauer	Republican	1896	Incumbent re-elected.	▌ ✓ Lucius Littauer (Republican) 54.8%; ▌ Joseph A. Kellogg (Democratic) 41.1%; ▌ Charles E. Robbins (Prohibition) 2.6%; ▌ Philip V. Danahy (Social Democratic) 1.5%
New York 26	William H. Flack	Republican	1902	Incumbent re-elected.	▌ ✓ William H. Flack (Republican) 67.5%; ▌ Henry Holland (Democratic) 29.8%; ▌ Charles W. McClair (Prohibition) 2.3%; ▌ Powell J. Currier (Social Democratic) 0.4%
New York 27	James S. Sherman	Republican	1892	Incumbent re-elected.	▌ ✓ James S. Sherman (Republican) 54.5%; ▌ William H. Squires (Democratic) 42.7%; ▌ Frederick O. Harter (Prohibition) 1.7%; ▌ Fred M. Humanstin (Social Democratic) 1.1%
New York 28	Charles L. Knapp	Republican	1900	Incumbent re-elected.	▌ ✓ Charles L. Knapp (Republican) 60.2%; ▌ Henry Purcell (Democratic) 34.8%; ▌ Charles W. Richards (Prohibition) 3.7%; ▌ Joseph Lavigne (Social Democratic) 1.3%
New York 29	Michael E. Driscoll	Republican	1898	Incumbent re-elected.	▌ ✓ Michael E. Driscoll (Republican) 62.6%; ▌ Harrison W. Coley (Democratic) 34.0%; ▌ S. Mead Wing (Prohibition) 1.8%; ▌ Gustave A. Strebel (Social Democratic) 1.6%
New York 30	John W. Dwight	Republican	1902	Incumbent re-elected.	▌ ✓ John W. Dwight (Republican) 59.8%; ▌ George L. Church (Democratic) 36.8%; ▌ James S. Bradbrook (Prohibition) 3.4%
New York 31	Sereno E. Payne	Republican	1889	Incumbent re-elected.	▌ ✓ Sereno E. Payne (Republican) 61.5%; ▌ D. J. Van Auken (Democratic) 36.4%; ▌ John McMillen (Prohibition) 2.1%
New York 32	James Breck Perkins	Republican	1900	Incumbent re-elected.	▌ ✓ James Breck Perkins (Republican) 58.9%; ▌ Henry S. Bacon (Democratic) 34.1%; ▌ Gad Martindale (Social Democratic) 3.9%; ▌ Edwin D. Clapp (Prohibition) 2.1%; ▌ Robert C. Wetzel (Socialist Labor) 0.7%
New York 33	Charles W. Gillet	Republican	1892	Incumbent retired. Republican hold.	▌ ✓ Jacob Sloat Fassett (Republican) 57.5%; ▌ Frank P. Frost (Democratic) 39.5%; ▌ Amos P. Straight (Prohibition) 2.9%
New York 34	James W. Wadsworth	Republican	1890	Incumbent re-elected.	▌ ✓ James W. Wadsworth (Republican) 60.5%; ▌ James E. Crisfield (Democratic) 36.2%; ▌ Charles J. Scholpp (Prohibition) 3.3%
New York 35	William H. Ryan	Democratic	1898	Incumbent re-elected.	▌ ✓ William H. Ryan (Democratic) 49.4%; ▌ Warren P. Bender (Republican) 47.2%; ▌ Ludwig Schroeter (Social Democratic) 1.9%; ▌ Thomas H. Jackson (Socialist Labor) 1.1%; ▌ Elijah J. Cook (Prohibition) 0.4%
New York 36	De Alva S. Alexander	Republican	1896	Incumbent re-elected.	▌ ✓ De Alva S. Alexander (Republican) 59.8%; ▌ Edwin G. Flanigen (Democratic) 37.6%; ▌ Edwin Puzey (Prohibition) 1.2%; ▌ Tom Fitten (Social Democratic) 1.0%; ▌ William F. Rohloff (Socialist Labor) 0.4%
New York 37	Edward B. Vreeland	Republican	1899	Incumbent re-elected.	▌ ✓ Edward B. Vreeland (Republican) 67.7%; ▌ S. B. McClure (Democratic) 26.7%; ▌ Silas W. Bond (Prohibition) 3.7%; ▌ Charles P. Bush (Social Democratic) 1.9%

== North Carolina ==
District	Incumbent			This race	
District	Member	Party	First elected	Results	Candidates
North Carolina 1	John H. Small	Democratic	1898	Incumbent re-elected.	▌ ✓ John H. Small (Democratic) 80.5%; ▌ D. O. Newberry (Republican) 19.5%
North Carolina 2	Claude Kitchin	Democratic	1900	Incumbent re-elected.	▌ ✓ Claude Kitchin (Democratic) 86.3%; ▌ P. C. Jenkins (Republican) 13.7%
North Carolina 3	Charles R. Thomas	Democratic	1898	Incumbent re-elected.	▌ ✓ Charles R. Thomas (Democratic) 66.0%; ▌ W. S. Robinson (Republican) 34.1%
North Carolina 4	Edward W. Pou	Democratic	1900	Incumbent re-elected.	▌ ✓ Edward W. Pou (Democratic) 70.9%; ▌ Claude Pearson (Republican) 29.1%
North Carolina 5	William Walton Kitchin	Democratic	1896	Incumbent re-elected.	▌ ✓ William Walton Kitchin (Democratic) 58.7%; ▌ C. A. Reynolds (Republican) 41.1%; ▌ J. W. Kester (Independent) 0.2%
North Carolina 6	Gilbert B. Patterson	Democratic	1902	Incumbent re-elected.	▌ ✓ Gilbert B. Patterson (Democratic) 70.0%; ▌ O. J. Spears (Republican) 30.0%
North Carolina 7	Robert N. Page	Democratic	1902	Incumbent re-elected.	▌ ✓ Robert N. Page (Democratic) 58.5%; ▌ L. D. Mendenhall (Republican) 41.6%
North Carolina 8	Theodore F. Kluttz	Democratic	1898	Incumbent retired. Republican gain.	▌ ✓ E. Spencer Blackburn (Republican) 50.3%; ▌ William C. Newland (Democratic) 49.5%; ▌ R. Z. Linney (Independent Republican) 0.2%
North Carolina 9	E. Yates Webb	Democratic	1902	Incumbent re-elected.	▌ ✓ E. Yates Webb (Democratic) 58.1%; ▌ J. F. Newell (Republican) 41.9%
North Carolina 10	James M. Gudger Jr.	Democratic	1902	Incumbent re-elected.	▌ ✓ James M. Gudger Jr. (Democratic) 51.7%; ▌ Hamilton G. Ewart (Republican) 48.3%

== North Dakota ==
District	Incumbent			This race	
District	Member	Party	First elected	Results	Candidates
North Dakota at-large 2 seats on a general ticket	Thomas F. Marshall	Republican	1900	Incumbent re-elected.	▌ ✓ Thomas F. Marshall (Republican) 36.89%; ▌ ✓ Asle Gronna (Republican) 35.79%; ▌N. P. Rasmussen (Democratic) 11.73%; ▌A. G. Burr (Democratic) 11.57%; ▌L. F. Dow (Socialist) 1.30%; ▌E. D. Herring (Socialist) 1.28%; ▌B. H. Tibbets (Prohibition) 0.73%; ▌N. A. Colby (Prohibition) 0.71%
North Dakota at-large 2 seats on a general ticket	Burleigh F. Spalding	Republican	1902	Incumbent lost renomination. Republican hold.	▌ ✓ Thomas F. Marshall (Republican) 36.89%; ▌ ✓ Asle Gronna (Republican) 35.79%; ▌N. P. Rasmussen (Democratic) 11.73%; ▌A. G. Burr (Democratic) 11.57%; ▌L. F. Dow (Socialist) 1.30%; ▌E. D. Herring (Socialist) 1.28%; ▌B. H. Tibbets (Prohibition) 0.73%; ▌N. A. Colby (Prohibition) 0.71%

== Ohio ==
District	Incumbent			This race	
District	Member	Party	First elected	Results	Candidates
Ohio 1	Nicholas Longworth	Republican	1902	Incumbent re-elected.	▌ ✓ Nicholas Longworth (Republican) 68.7%; ▌ Braxton W. Campbell (Democratic) 24.9%; ▌ Bishop W. Mason (Socialist) 5.9%; ▌ John Robertson (Prohibition) 0.5%
Ohio 2	Herman P. Goebel	Republican	1902	Incumbent re-elected.	▌ ✓ Herman P. Goebel (Republican) 62.8%; ▌ Charles A. Miller (Democratic) 28.0%; ▌ John F. Ditchen (Socialist) 8.8%; ▌ Lewis W. Mathewson (Prohibition) 0.4%
Ohio 3	Robert M. Nevin	Republican	1900	Incumbent re-elected.	▌ ✓ Robert M. Nevin (Republican) 53.0%; ▌ Charles Conley (Democratic) 42.9%; ▌ Walter G. Critchlow (Socialist) 2.7%; ▌ James C. Upfold (Prohibition) 1.3%; ▌ Eber Hollingsworth (Populist) 0.1%
Ohio 4	Harvey C. Garber	Democratic	1902	Incumbent re-elected.	▌ ✓ Harvey C. Garber (Democratic) 50.8%; ▌ J. C. Rosser (Republican) 46.4%; ▌ George Simms (Prohibition) 1.9%; ▌ Lawrence Phalen (Socialist) 0.9%
Ohio 5	John S. Snook	Democratic	1900	Incumbent retired. Republican gain.	▌ ✓ William Wildman Campbell (Republican) 49.4%; ▌ Timothy T. Ansberry (Democratic) 48.6%; ▌ Simon W. Cramer (Prohibition) 1.5%; ▌ Henry Ackley (Socialist) 0.5%
Ohio 6	Charles Q. Hildebrant	Republican	1900	Incumbent lost renomination. Republican hold.	▌ ✓ Thomas E. Scroggy (Republican) 51.4%; ▌ James A. Runyan (Democratic) 45.8%; ▌ George Dodds (Prohibition) 1.9%; ▌ Joseph H. Sims (Socialist) 0.9%
Ohio 7	Thomas B. Kyle	Republican	1900	Incumbent lost renomination. Republican hold.	▌ ✓ J. Warren Keifer (Republican) 60.0%; ▌ P. E. Montanus (Democratic) 37.9%; ▌ George H. Creamer (Prohibition) 2.1%
Ohio 8	William R. Warnock	Republican	1900	Incumbent retired. Republican hold.	▌ ✓ Ralph D. Cole (Republican) 60.5%; ▌ Henry F. MacCracken (Democratic) 35.8%; ▌ Robert Grieve (Prohibition) 2.6%; ▌ Benjamin F. Hutchinson (Socialist) 1.1%
Ohio 9	James H. Southard	Republican	1894	Incumbent re-elected.	▌ ✓ James H. Southard (Republican) 63.7%; ▌ William H. Althof (Democratic) 29.9%; ▌ Walter C. Guntrup (Socialist) 4.5%; ▌ Aaron S. Watkins (Prohibition) 1.9%
Ohio 10	Stephen Morgan	Republican	1898	Incumbent lost renomination. Republican hold.	▌ ✓ Henry T. Bannon (Republican) 62.6%; ▌ Matthew S. Merriman (Democratic) 33.2%; ▌ George P. Taubman (Prohibition) 2.2%; ▌ E. J. Ziegler (Socialist) 2.0%
Ohio 11	Charles H. Grosvenor	Republican	1892	Incumbent re-elected.	▌ ✓ Charles H. Grosvenor (Republican) 58.9%; ▌ John T. Bridwell (Democratic) 39.1%; ▌ William Nuzum (Prohibition) 2.0%
Ohio 12	De Witt C. Badger	Democratic	1902	Incumbent lost re-election. Republican gain.	▌ ✓ Edward L. Taylor Jr. (Republican) 56.6%; ▌ De Witt C. Badger (Democratic) 40.5%; ▌ Nelson D. Creamer (Prohibition) 1.6%; ▌ March C. Green (Socialist) 1.3%
Ohio 13	Amos H. Jackson	Republican	1902	Incumbent retired. Republican hold.	▌ ✓ Grant E. Mouser (Republican) 49.5%; ▌ Daniel Richard Crissinger (Democratic) 47.4%; ▌ Peter Unsinger (Socialist) 1.8%; ▌ Emery D. Paulin (Prohibition) 1.3%
Ohio 14	William W. Skiles	Republican	1900	Incumbent died. Winner also elected to finish term. Republican hold.	▌ ✓ Amos R. Webber (Republican) 57.4%; ▌ Benjamin F. Long (Democratic) 38.0%; ▌ John Hobbs (Socialist) 2.5%; ▌ Ralph Davey (Prohibition) 2.1%
Ohio 15	H. Clay Van Voorhis	Republican	1892	Incumbent retired. Republican hold.	▌ ✓ Beman Gates Dawes (Republican) 48.4%; ▌ Ernest B. Schneider (Democratic) 47.2%; ▌ Howard C. Morledge (Prohibition) 3.7%; ▌ William H. Crawford (Socialist) 0.7%
Ohio 16	Capell L. Weems	Republican	1902	Incumbent re-elected.	▌ ✓ Capell L. Weems (Republican) 59.1%; ▌ H. W. Hermann (Democratic) 34.8%; ▌ Herbert Moninger (Prohibition) 3.5%; ▌ Lewis H. Upland (Socialist) 2.6%
Ohio 17	John W. Cassingham	Democratic	1900	Incumbent retired Republican gain.	▌ ✓ Martin L. Smyser (Republican) 50.7%; ▌ J. E. Hurst (Democratic) 45.8%; ▌ Charles B. Henthorn (Prohibition) 2.0%; ▌ Edward P. Miller (Socialist) 1.5%
Ohio 18	James Kennedy	Republican	1902	Incumbent re-elected.	▌ ✓ James Kennedy (Republican) 63.9%; ▌ William J. Foley (Democratic) 28.5%; ▌ John T. Jenkins (Socialist) 4.4%; ▌ Daniel J. Smith (Prohibition) 3.2%
Ohio 19	Charles W. F. Dick	Republican	1898	Incumbent resigned to become U.S. Senator. Winner also elected to finish term. Republican hold.	▌ ✓ W. Aubrey Thomas (Republican) 68.9%; ▌ Charles J. McCormick (Democratic) 23.1%; ▌ F. N. Prevey (Socialist) 5.7%; ▌ Willis E. Foltz (Prohibition) 2.3%
Ohio 20	Jacob A. Beidler	Republican	1900	Incumbent re-elected.	▌ ✓ Jacob A. Beidler (Republican) 59.8%; ▌ Charles W. Lapp (Democratic) 34.7%; ▌ Edwin F. Coverett (Socialist) 4.3%; ▌ John Kline (Prohibition) 1.2%
Ohio 21	Theodore E. Burton	Republican	1894	Incumbent re-elected.	▌ ✓ Theodore E. Burton (Republican) 86.6%; ▌ Max S. Hayes (Socialist) 10.6%; ▌ John McDonough (Prohibition) 1.0%; ▌ James Rugg (Socialist Labor) 0.9%

== Oregon ==
District	Incumbent			This race	
District	Member	Party	First elected	Results	Candidates
Oregon 1	Binger Hermann	Republican	1903 (special)	Incumbent re-elected.	▌ ✓ Binger Hermann (Republican) 51.23%; ▌R. M. Veatch (Democratic) 36.67%; ▌Hiram Gould (Prohibition) 6.13%; ▌Benjamin Franklin Ramp (Socialist) 5.98%
Oregon 2	John N. Williamson	Republican	1902	Incumbent re-elected.	▌ ✓ John N. Williamson (Republican) 57.58%; ▌J. E. Simmons (Democratic) 27.11%; ▌George R. Cook (Socialist) 7.81%; ▌H. W. Stone (Prohibition) 7.50%

== Pennsylvania ==
District	Incumbent			This race	
District	Member	Party	First elected	Results	Candidates
Pennsylvania 1	Henry H. Bingham	Republican	1878	Incumbent re-elected.	▌ ✓ Henry H. Bingham (Republican) 84.7%; ▌ Joseph L. Galen (Democratic) 15.3%
Pennsylvania 2	Robert Adams Jr.	Republican	1893	Incumbent re-elected.	▌ ✓ Robert Adams Jr. (Republican) 84.9%; ▌ John Cadwalader Jr. (Democratic) 14.3%; ▌ Godfrey Stinger (Prohibition) 0.4%; ▌ G. G. Mercer (Independent) 0.4%
Pennsylvania 3	George A. Castor	Republican	1904	Incumbent re-elected.	▌ ✓ George A. Castor (Republican) 83.3%; ▌ John H. Fow (Independent/Democratic) 16.4%; ▌ J. F. Bodine (Prohibition) 0.3%
Pennsylvania 4	Reuben Moon	Republican	1903	Incumbent re-elected.	▌ ✓ Reuben Moon (Republican) 81.1%; ▌ Charles F. Stilz (Democratic) 16.6%; ▌ A. J. Merrill (Independent) 1.2%; ▌ Edwin J. Walker (Prohibition) 1.1%
Pennsylvania 5	Edward de Veaux Morrell	Republican	1900	Incumbent re-elected.	▌ ✓ Edward de Veaux Morrell (Republican) 78.8%; ▌ David Moffet (Democratic) 18.3%; ▌ John McDonough (Socialist) 2.1%; ▌ C. E. McClellan (Prohibition) 0.8%
Pennsylvania 6	George D. McCreary	Republican	1902	Incumbent re-elected.	▌ ✓ George D. McCreary (Republican) 76.7%; ▌ W. A. Carr (Democratic) 19.1%; ▌ J. F. Edwards (Independent) 1.9%; ▌ George J. Felder (Socialist) 1.2%; ▌ David M. Barr (Prohibition) 1.1%
Pennsylvania 7	Thomas S. Butler	Republican	1896	Incumbent re-elected.	▌ ✓ Thomas S. Butler (Republican) 77.5%; ▌ Archibald M. Holding (Democratic) 19.2%; ▌ Augustus Brosius (Prohibition) 2.6%; ▌ Aquilla H. Stokes (Socialist) 0.7%
Pennsylvania 8	Irving P. Wanger	Republican	1892	Incumbent re-elected.	▌ ✓ Irving P. Wanger (Republican) 60.9%; ▌ Joseph J. Broadhurst (Democratic) 37.0%; ▌ Atmore Loomis (Prohibition) 1.1%; ▌ Hugh Ayres (Socialist) 1.0%
Pennsylvania 9	Henry B. Cassel	Republican	1901	Incumbent re-elected.	▌ ✓ Henry B. Cassel (Republican) 54.7%; ▌ Milton J. Brecht (Citizens) 35.6%; ▌ Hugh M. North Jr. (Democratic) 8.9%; ▌ Cuvier Spangler (Prohibition) 0.8%
Pennsylvania 10	William Connell	Republican	1896	Incumbent retired. Republican hold.	▌ ✓ Thomas H. Dale (Republican) 53.2%; ▌ George Howell (Democratic) 44.9%; ▌ William H. Richmond (Prohibition) 1.1%; ▌ C. E. Lamb (Socialist) 0.5%; ▌ J. A. Barron (Socialist Labor) 0.3%
Pennsylvania 11	Henry W. Palmer	Republican	1900	Incumbent re-elected.	▌ ✓ Henry W. Palmer (Republican) 60.8%; ▌ William L. Raeder (Democratic) 37.1%; ▌ C. F. Quinn (Socialist) 2.1%
Pennsylvania 12	George R. Patterson	Republican	1900	Incumbent re-elected.	▌ ✓ George R. Patterson (Republican) 57.4%; ▌ Harry O. Haag (Democratic) 39.6%; ▌ M. E. Doyle (Socialist) 2.2%; ▌ William H. Zweizig (Prohibition) 0.8%
Pennsylvania 13	Marcus C. L. Kline	Democratic	1902	Incumbent re-elected.	▌ ✓ Marcus C. L. Kline (Democratic) 50.1%; ▌ William H. Sowden (Republican) 46.4%; ▌ Robert B. Ringler (Socialist) 2.6%; ▌ Wesley M. Bowman (Prohibition) 1.0%
Pennsylvania 14	Charles Frederick Wright	Republican	1898	Incumbent retired. Republican hold.	▌ ✓ Mial Eben Lilley (Republican) 58.4%; ▌ John Kuhbach (Democratic) 32.6%; ▌ William S. H. Heermans (Prohibition) 9.0%
Pennsylvania 15	Elias Deemer	Republican	1900	Incumbent re-elected.	▌ ✓ Elias Deemer (Republican) 58.3%; ▌ George B. McMetzger (Democratic) 35.2%; ▌ Albert H. Bingham (Prohibition) 4.4%; ▌ C. A. Reese (Socialist) 2.2%
Pennsylvania 16	Charles Heber Dickerman	Democratic	1902	Incumbent declined renomination. Republican gain.	▌ ✓ Edmund W. Samuel (Republican) 51.6%; ▌ Henry E. Davis (Democratic) 45.5%; ▌ Martin P. Lutz (Prohibition) 2.8%; ▌ J. D. Harris (Independent) 0.1%
Pennsylvania 17	Thaddeus M. Mahon	Republican	1892	Incumbent re-elected.	▌ ✓ Thaddeus M. Mahon (Republican) 61.4%; ▌ O. C. Bowers (Democratic) 35.8%; ▌ J. S. Yaukey (Prohibition) 2.8%
Pennsylvania 18	Marlin E. Olmsted	Republican	1896	Incumbent re-elected.	▌ ✓ Marlin E. Olmsted (Republican) 67.6%; ▌ John L. Saylor (Democratic) 29.2%; ▌ William M. Burkstresser (Prohibition) 3.2%
Pennsylvania 19	Alvin Evans	Republican	1900	Incumbent retired. Republican hold.	▌ ✓ John Merriman Reynolds (Republican) 54.9%; ▌ Joseph E. Thropp (Democratic/Prohibition) 45.1%
Pennsylvania 20	Daniel F. Lafean	Republican	1902	Incumbent re-elected.	▌ ✓ Daniel F. Lafean (Republican) 55.8%; ▌ William McSherry (Democratic) 43.2%; ▌ Samuel S. W. Hammers (Prohibition) 1.1%
Pennsylvania 21	Solomon R. Dresser	Republican	1902	Incumbent re-elected.	▌ ✓ Solomon R. Dresser (Republican) 59.6%; ▌ Charles W. Shaffer (Democratic) 31.2%; ▌ Samuel C. Watts (Prohibition) 7.9%; ▌ James D. Blair (Socialist) 1.4%
Pennsylvania 22	George F. Huff	Republican	1902	Incumbent re-elected.	▌ ✓ George F. Huff (Republican) 65.5%; ▌ Charles M. Heineman (Democratic) 29.9%; ▌ Clinton D. Greenlee (Prohibition) 3.6%
Pennsylvania 23	Allen F. Cooper	Republican	1902	Incumbent re-elected.	▌ ✓ Allen F. Cooper (Republican) 58.7%; ▌ Charles F. Uhl Jr. (Democratic) 34.2%; ▌ George H. Hocking (Prohibition) 7.2%
Pennsylvania 24	Ernest F. Acheson	Republican	1894	Incumbent re-elected.	▌ ✓ Ernest F. Acheson (Republican) 69.4%; ▌ William J. Mellon (Democratic) 25.3%; ▌ John J. Ashenhurst (Prohibition) 5.4%
Pennsylvania 25	Arthur L. Bates	Republican	1900	Incumbent re-elected.	▌ ✓ Arthur L. Bates (Republican) 61.9%; ▌ E. W. McArthur (Democratic) 28.9%; ▌ R. C. Loupe (Prohibition) 5.9%; ▌ Joshua Wanhope (Socialist) 3.3%
Pennsylvania 26	Joseph H. Shull	Democratic	1902	Incumbent lost renomination and lost re-election as an Independent Democratic candidate. Republican gain.	▌ ✓ Gustav A. Schneebeli (Republican) 45.3%; ▌ Joseph Davis Brodhead (Democratic/Citizens) 39.6%; ▌ Joseph H. Shull (Pure Politics) 11.5%; ▌ William J. Bolles (Socialist) 2.1%; ▌ J. S. Heisler (Prohibition) 1.5%
Pennsylvania 27	William Orlando Smith	Republican	1902	Incumbent re-elected.	▌ ✓ William Orlando Smith (Republican) 71.8%; ▌ A. C. Smith (Democratic) 28.2%
Pennsylvania 28	Joseph C. Sibley	Republican	1898	Incumbent re-elected.	▌ ✓ Joseph C. Sibley (Republican) 55.2%; ▌ Salem Heilman (Democratic) 29.6%; ▌ John E. Gill (Prohibition) 12.9%; ▌ W. L. Foster (Socialist) 2.3%
Pennsylvania 29	George Shiras III	Citizens Republican	1902	Incumbent retired. Republican gain.	▌ ✓ William H. Graham (Republican) 80.1%; ▌ W. H. Seward Thomson (Democratic) 15.0%; ▌ William S. Teuscher (Socialist) 2.5%; ▌ George M. Paden (Prohibition) 2.4%
Pennsylvania 30	John Dalzell	Republican	1886	Incumbent re-elected.	▌ ✓ John Dalzell (Republican) 79.0%; ▌ M. L. Thompson (Democratic) 15.2%; ▌ Andrew J. Hesser (Prohibition) 3.3%; ▌ W. J. Wright (Socialist) 2.5%
Pennsylvania 31	Henry Kirke Porter	Citizens Republican	1902	Incumbent lost renomination. Republican gain.	▌ ✓ James F. Burke (Republican) 75.2%; ▌ John F. McGrath (Democratic) 21.6%; ▌ Louis Cohen (Socialist) 1.9%; ▌ Joseph S. Dodds (Prohibition) 1.2%
Pennsylvania 32	James W. Brown	Citizens Republican	1902	Incumbent retired. Republican gain.	▌ ✓ Andrew J. Barchfeld (Republican) 75.9%; ▌ John Pierce (Democratic) 18.4%; ▌ William J. Ritchey (Socialist) 3.6%; ▌ John H. Norris (Prohibition) 2.1%

== Rhode Island ==
District	Incumbent			This race	
District	Member	Party	First elected	Results	Candidates
Rhode Island 1	Daniel L. D. Granger	Democratic	1902	Incumbent re-elected.	▌ ✓ Daniel L. D. Granger (Democratic) 49.5%; ▌ J. H. Stiness (Republican) 49.0%; ▌ George A. Combear (Prohibition) 1.5%
Rhode Island 2	Adin B. Capron	Republican	1896	Incumbent re-elected.	▌ ✓ Adin B. Capron (Republican) 56.8%; ▌ Franklin P. Owen (Democratic) 41.4%; ▌ Bernon E. Helme (Prohibition) 1.9%

== South Carolina ==
District	Incumbent			This race	
District	Member	Party	First elected	Results	Candidates
South Carolina 1	George Swinton Legaré	Democratic	1902	Incumbent re-elected.	▌ ✓ George Swinton Legaré (Democratic) 91.3%; ▌J. N. Noland (Republican) 5.2%; ▌Aaron P. Prioleau (Republican) 3.5%
South Carolina 2	George W. Croft	Democratic	1902	Incumbent retired. Democratic hold.	▌ ✓ James O. Patterson (Democratic) 94.7%; ▌Isaac Myers (Republican) 5.3%
South Carolina 3	Wyatt Aiken	Democratic	1902	Incumbent re-elected.	▌ ✓ Wyatt Aiken (Democratic) 98.2%; ▌John Scott (Republican) 1.8%
South Carolina 4	Joseph T. Johnson	Democratic	1900	Incumbent re-elected.	▌ ✓ Joseph T. Johnson (Democratic) 97.5%; ▌J. D. Adams (Republican) 2.5%
South Carolina 5	David E. Finley	Democratic	1898	Incumbent re-elected.	▌ ✓ David E. Finley (Democratic) 98.5%; ▌C. P. White (Republican) 1.5%
South Carolina 6	Robert B. Scarborough	Democratic	1900	Incumbent retired. Democratic hold.	▌ ✓ J. Edwin Ellerbe (Democratic) 95.8%; ▌E. H. Deas (Republican) 4.2%
South Carolina 7	A. Frank Lever	Democratic	1901 (special)	Incumbent re-elected.	▌ ✓ A. Frank Lever (Democratic) 93.8%; ▌C. C. Jacobs (Republican) 6.0%; Others 0.2%

== South Dakota ==
District	Incumbent			This race	
District	Member	Party	First elected	Results	Candidates
South Dakota at-large (2 seats elected on a general ticket)	Charles H. Burke	Republican	1898	Incumbent re-elected.	▌ ✓ Eben Martin (Republican) 35.03%; ▌ ✓ Charles H. Burke (Republican) 35.00%; ▌Wesley A. Stuart (Democratic) 11.36%; ▌William A. Lynch (Democratic) 11.33%; ▌Henry W. Smith (Socialist) 1.56%; ▌S. A. Cochrane (Socialist) 1.53%; ▌A. Jamieson (Prohibition) 1.51%; ▌C. K. Thompson (Prohibition) 1.48%; ▌A. J. McCain (Populist) 0.61%; ▌G. W. Lattin (Populist) 0.59%
South Dakota at-large (2 seats elected on a general ticket)	Eben Martin	Republican	1900	Incumbent re-elected.	▌ ✓ Eben Martin (Republican) 35.03%; ▌ ✓ Charles H. Burke (Republican) 35.00%; ▌Wesley A. Stuart (Democratic) 11.36%; ▌William A. Lynch (Democratic) 11.33%; ▌Henry W. Smith (Socialist) 1.56%; ▌S. A. Cochrane (Socialist) 1.53%; ▌A. Jamieson (Prohibition) 1.51%; ▌C. K. Thompson (Prohibition) 1.48%; ▌A. J. McCain (Populist) 0.61%; ▌G. W. Lattin (Populist) 0.59%

== Tennessee ==
District	Incumbent			This race	
District	Member	Party	First elected	Results	Candidates
Tennessee 1	Walter P. Brownlow	Republican	1896	Incumbent re-elected.	▌ ✓ Walter P. Brownlow (Republican) 68.89%; ▌R. E. Styill (Democratic) 31.12%
Tennessee 2	Henry R. Gibson	Republican	1894	Incumbent retired. Republican hold.	▌ ✓ Nathan W. Hale (Republican) 70.93%; ▌J. W. Staples (Democratic) 28.50%; ▌D. A. Vess (Socialist) 0.57%
Tennessee 3	John A. Moon	Democratic	1896	Incumbent re-elected.	▌ ✓ John A. Moon (Democratic) 53.23%; ▌Robert S. Sharp (Republican) 45.97%; ▌R. B. Taggart (Socialist) 0.80%
Tennessee 4	Morgan C. Fitzpatrick	Democratic	1902	Incumbent retired. Democratic hold.	▌ ✓ Mounce G. Butler (Democratic) 53.27%; ▌W. B. Pickering (Republican) 46.24%; ▌J. J. Miles (Populist) 0.49%
Tennessee 5	James D. Richardson	Democratic	1884	Incumbent retired. Democratic hold.	▌ ✓ William C. Houston (Democratic) 68.69%; ▌E. W. Brown (Republican) 31.32%
Tennessee 6	John W. Gaines	Democratic	1896	Incumbent re-elected.	▌ ✓ John W. Gaines (Democratic) 78.97%; ▌H. L. Maxwell (Republican) 20.16%; ▌H. G. Sneed (Socialist) 0.87%
Tennessee 7	Lemuel P. Padgett	Democratic	1900	Incumbent re-elected.	▌ ✓ Lemuel P. Padgett (Democratic) 61.90%; ▌A. M. Hughes (Republican) 37.96%; ▌H. G. Smith (Socialist) 0.14%
Tennessee 8	Thetus W. Sims	Democratic	1896	Incumbent re-elected.	▌ ✓ Thetus W. Sims (Democratic) 53.91%; ▌F. M. Davis (Republican) 46.09%
Tennessee 9	Rice A. Pierce	Democratic	1896	Incumbent lost renomination. Democratic hold.	▌ ✓ Finis J. Garrett (Democratic) 74.88%; ▌John R. Walker (Republican) 25.12%
Tennessee 10	Malcolm R. Patterson	Democratic	1900	Incumbent re-elected.	▌ ✓ Malcolm R. Patterson (Democratic) 75.94%; ▌Grant Matthews (Republican) 24.06%

== Texas ==
District	Incumbent			This race	
District	Member	Party	First elected	Results	Candidates
Texas 1	Morris Sheppard	Democratic	1902	Incumbent re-elected.	▌ ✓ Morris Sheppard (Democratic) 72.1%; ▌ J. A. Armistead (Republican) 28.0%
Texas 2	Samuel B. Cooper	Democratic	1892	Incumbent lost renomination. Democratic hold.	▌ ✓ Moses L. Broocks (Democratic) 76.2%; ▌ Andrew Jackson Houston (Republican) 23.8%
Texas 3	Gordon J. Russell	Democratic	1902	Incumbent re-elected.	▌ ✓ Gordon J. Russell (Democratic) 73.7%; ▌ C. T. White (Republican) 26.3%
Texas 4	Choice B. Randell	Democratic	1900	Incumbent re-elected.	▌ ✓ Choice B. Randell (Democratic) 90.4%; ▌ R. E. Martin (Republican) 9.6%
Texas 5	James Andrew Beall	Democratic	1902	Incumbent re-elected	▌ ✓ James Andrew Beall (Democratic) 86.0%; ▌ J. J. Cypert (Republican) 14.0%
Texas 6	Scott Field	Democratic	1902	Incumbent re-elected.	▌ ✓ Scott Field (Democratic) 100%
Texas 7	Alexander W. Gregg	Democratic	1902	Incumbent re-elected	▌ ✓ Alexander W. Gregg (Democratic) 100%
Texas 8	John M. Pinckney	Democratic	1903	Incumbent re-elected.	▌ ✓ John M. Pinckney (Democratic) 69.1%; ▌ Henry F. McGregor (Republican) 30.9%
Texas 9	George F. Burgess	Democratic	1900	Incumbent re-elected	▌ ✓ George F. Burgess (Democratic) 72.3%; ▌ B. L. Osgood (Republican) 27.7%
Texas 10	Albert S. Burleson	Democratic	1898	Incumbent re-elected	▌ ✓ Albert S. Burleson (Democratic) 100%
Texas 11	Robert L. Henry	Democratic	1896	Incumbent re-elected	▌ ✓ Robert L. Henry (Democratic) 84.4%; ▌ Joe E. Williams (Republican) 15.7%
Texas 12	Oscar W. Gillespie	Democratic	1902	Incumbent re-elected.	▌ ✓ Oscar W. Gillespie (Democratic) 74.4%; ▌ Frank B. Stanley (Republican) 14.1%; ▌ J. M. Mallett (Ind. Republican) 11.5%
Texas 13	John H. Stephens	Democratic	1896	Incumbent re-elected	▌ ✓ John H. Stephens (Democratic) 89.6%; ▌ James M. Kindred (Republican) 10.4%
Texas 14	James L. Slayden	Democratic	1896	Incumbent re-elected	▌ ✓ James L. Slayden (Democratic) 98.3%; ▌ Alfred Vanderstucken (Republican) 1.7%
Texas 15	John Nance Garner	Democratic	1902	Incumbent re-elected	▌ ✓ John Nance Garner (Democratic) 64.9%; ▌ J. S. Morin (Republican) 35.1%
Texas 16	William R. Smith	Democratic	1902	Incumbent re-elected	▌ ✓ William R. Smith (Democratic) 83.1%; ▌ Logan McPherson (Republican) 16.9%

== Utah ==
District	Incumbent			This race	
District	Member	Party	First elected	Results	Candidates
Utah at-large	Joseph Howell	Republican	1902	Incumbent re-elected.	▌ ✓ Joseph Howell (Republican) 51.8%; ▌ Orlando W Powers (Democratic) 36.8%; ▌ Ogden Hiles (American) 6.7%; ▌ W. H. Shock (Socialist) 4.7%

== Vermont ==
District	Incumbent			This race	
District	Member	Party	First elected	Results	Candidates
Vermont 1	David J. Foster	Republican	1900	Incumbent re-elected.	▌ ✓ David J. Foster (Republican) 70.3%; ▌Frank L. Graves (Democratic) 26.9%; ▌Harvey Ketcham (Prohibition) 1.8%; ▌John Arvidson (Socialist) 1.0%
Vermont 2	Kittredge Haskins	Republican	1900	Incumbent re-elected.	▌ ✓ Kittredge Haskins (Republican) 75.0%; ▌Harland B. Howe (Democratic) 22.0%; ▌Lester W. Hanson (Prohibition) 1.7%; ▌Timothy Ivers (Socialist) 1.3%

== Virginia ==
District	Incumbent			This race	
District	Member	Party	First elected	Results	Candidates
Virginia 1	William A. Jones	Democratic	1890	Incumbent re-elected.	▌ ✓ William A. Jones (Democratic) 77.1%; ▌Josephus Trader (Republican) 22.9%
Virginia 2	Harry L. Maynard	Democratic	1900	Incumbent re-elected.	▌ ✓ Harry L. Maynard (Democratic) 78.3%; ▌Robert M. Hughes (Republican) 20.4%; Others: ▌Lewis A. Hall (Socialist) 1.0%; ▌P. A. Wiggins (Socialist Labor) 0.2%
Virginia 3	John Lamb	Democratic	1896	Incumbent re-elected.	▌ ✓ John Lamb (Democratic) 78.0%; ▌Edgar Allen (Republican) 11.2%; ▌George A. Harrison (Republican) 8.5%; Others: ▌J. B. Johnson (Independent) 1.5%; ▌H. Adolph Muller (Socialist Labor) 0.4%; ▌John Catrell (Socialist) 0.4%
Virginia 4	Robert G. Southall	Democratic	1902	Incumbent re-elected.	▌ ✓ Robert G. Southall (Democratic) 82.9%; ▌Charles Alexander (Republican) 17.1%
Virginia 5	Claude A. Swanson	Democratic	1892	Incumbent re-elected.	▌ ✓ Claude A. Swanson (Democratic) 65.0%; ▌J. B. Stovall (Republican) 35.0%
Virginia 6	Carter Glass	Democratic	1901 (special)	Incumbent re-elected.	▌ ✓ Carter Glass (Democratic) 69.1%; ▌Samuel H. Hoge (Republican) 30.4%; ▌Elroy R. Spencer (Socialist) 0.6%
Virginia 7	James Hay	Democratic	1896	Incumbent re-elected.	▌ ✓ James Hay (Democratic) 64.7%; ▌Charles M. Kelzel (Republican) 35.4%
Virginia 8	John Franklin Rixey	Democratic	1896	Incumbent re-elected.	▌ ✓ John Franklin Rixey (Democratic) 76.6%; ▌Ernest L. Howard (Republican) 23.4%
Virginia 9	Campbell Slemp	Republican	1902	Incumbent re-elected.	▌ ✓ Campbell Slemp (Republican) 57.2%; ▌J. C. Wysor (Democratic) 42.8%
Virginia 10	Henry D. Flood	Democratic	1900	Incumbent re-elected.	▌ ✓ Henry D. Flood (Democratic) 61.3%; ▌George A. Revercomb (Republican) 36.5%; ▌John A. Ofne (Independent) 2.2%

== Washington ==
District	Incumbent			This race	
District	Member	Party	First elected	Results	Candidates
Washington at-large (3 seats elected on a general ticket)	Wesley L. Jones	Republican	1898	Incumbent re-elected.	▌ ✓ Francis W. Cushman (Republican) 22.1%; ▌ ✓ Wesley L. Jones (Republican) 22.0%; ▌ ✓ William E. Humphrey (Republican) 21.9%; ▌ James J. Anderson (Democratic) 8.5%; ▌ Howard Hathaway (Democratic) 8.4%; ▌ W. T. Beck (Democratic) 8.3%; ▌ T. C. Wiswell (Socialist) 2.1%; ▌ George Croston (Socialist) 2.1%; ▌ H. D. Jory (Socialist) 2.1%; ▌ Ferdinand B. Hawes (Prohibition) 0.7%; ▌ Henry Brown (Prohibition) 0.7%; ▌ William Bonstein (Socialist Labor) 0.3%; ▌ R. McDonald (Socialist Labor) 0.3%; ▌ G. Norling (Socialist Labor) 0.3%
Washington at-large (3 seats elected on a general ticket)	Francis W. Cushman	Republican	1898	Incumbent re-elected.	
Washington at-large (3 seats elected on a general ticket)	William E. Humphrey	Republican	1902	Incumbent re-elected.	

== West Virginia ==
District	Incumbent			This race	
District	Member	Party	First elected	Results	Candidates
West Virginia 1	Blackburn B. Dovener	Republican	1894	Incumbent re-elected.	▌ ✓ Blackburn B. Dovener (Republican) 54.74%; ▌J. W. Barnes (Democratic) 41.27%; ▌B. H. Shadduck (Prohibition) 2.76%; ▌H. A. Leeds (Socialist) 1.24%
West Virginia 2	Alston G. Dayton	Republican	1894	Incumbent re-elected.	▌ ✓ Alston G. Dayton (Republican) 51.61%; ▌Stuart W. Walker (Democratic) 46.63%; ▌Larkin Bowers (Prohibition) 1.54%; ▌Joseph Silva (Socialist) 0.23%
West Virginia 3	Joseph H. Gaines	Republican	1900	Incumbent re-elected.	▌ ✓ Joseph H. Gaines (Republican) 52.77%; ▌H. B. Davenport (Democratic) 44.50%; ▌S. F. Nutter (Prohibition) 1.85%; ▌G. L. Burnbaugh (Socialist) 0.88%
West Virginia 4	Harry C. Woodyard	Republican	1902	Incumbent re-elected.	▌ ✓ Harry C. Woodyard (Republican) 53.59%; ▌Allen C. Murdock (Democratic) 44.16%; ▌M. H. Snodgrass (Prohibition) 2.00%; ▌J. W. Stewart (Socialist) 0.26%
West Virginia 5	James A. Hughes	Republican	1900	Incumbent re-elected.	▌ ✓ James A. Hughes (Republican) 55.78%; ▌S. S. Altezer (Democratic) 43.03%; Others: ▌J. S. Thornburg (Prohibition) 0.90%; ▌Henry Burke (Socialist) 0.29%

== Wisconsin ==
Wisconsin elected eleven members of congress on Election Day, November 8, 1904.

District	Incumbent			This race	
District	Member	Party	First elected	Results	Candidates
Wisconsin 1	Henry Allen Cooper	Republican	1892	Incumbent re-elected.	▌ ✓ Henry Allen Cooper (Republican) 59.5%; ▌Calvin Stewart (Democratic) 31.7%; ▌Jacob W. Born (Social Dem.) 5.8%; ▌Henry H. Tubbs (Prohibition) 3.6%
Wisconsin 2	Henry Cullen Adams	Republican	1902	Incumbent re-elected.	▌ ✓ Henry Cullen Adams (Republican) 57.7%; ▌John J. Wood (Democratic) 38.7%; ▌William J. McKay (Prohibition) 2.4%; ▌Henry J. Dunham (Social Dem.) 1.2%
Wisconsin 3	Joseph W. Babcock	Republican	1892	Incumbent re-elected.	▌ ✓ Joseph W. Babcock (Republican) 48.7%; ▌Herman Grotophorst (Democratic) 47.8%; ▌H. J. Noyes (Prohibition) 3.5%
Wisconsin 4	Theobald Otjen	Republican	1894	Incumbent re-elected.	▌ ✓ Theobald Otjen (Republican) 43.8%; ▌Peter J. Somers (Democratic) 30.8%; ▌Winfield R. Gaylord (Social Dem.) 24.0%; ▌Thomas Gardner (Prohibition) 1.5%
Wisconsin 5	William H. Stafford	Republican	1902	Incumbent re-elected.	▌ ✓ William H. Stafford (Republican) 44.8%; ▌Victor L. Berger (Social Dem.) 27.6%; ▌Arthur Dopp (Democratic) 25.9%; ▌Moritz A. Schmoyer (Prohibition) 1.4%; ▌Frank Wilke (Socialist Labor) 0.2%
Wisconsin 6	Charles H. Weisse	Democratic	1902	Incumbent re-elected.	▌ ✓ Charles H. Weisse (Democratic) 53.4%; ▌Roy L. Morse (Republican) 45.7%; ▌William J. Perry (Prohibition) 1.0%
Wisconsin 7	John J. Esch	Republican	1898	Incumbent re-elected.	▌ ✓ John J. Esch (Republican) 66.8%; ▌Norris C. Bascheller (Democratic) 29.5%; ▌George A. Markham (Prohibition) 2.5%; ▌Henry L. Leinenkugel (Social Dem.) 1.1%
Wisconsin 8	James H. Davidson	Republican	1896	Incumbent re-elected.	▌ ✓ James H. Davidson (Republican) 63.1%; ▌C. F. Crane (Democratic) 32.2%; ▌John J. Pitz (Social Dem.) 2.7%; ▌Charles A. Smart (Prohibition) 1.9%
Wisconsin 9	Edward S. Minor	Republican	1894	Incumbent re-elected.	▌ ✓ Edward S. Minor (Republican) 58.1%; ▌Robert J. McGeehan (Democratic) 38.6%; ▌Joseph W. Harris (Social Dem.) 2.0%; ▌Charles W. Loomas (Prohibition) 1.3%
Wisconsin 10	Webster E. Brown	Republican	1900	Incumbent re-elected.	▌ ✓ Webster E. Brown (Republican) 65.4%; ▌Wells M. Ruggles (Democratic) 31.4%; ▌Albert B. Crawford (Social Dem.) 1.8%; ▌David W. Emerson (Prohibition) 1.4%
Wisconsin 11	John J. Jenkins	Republican	1894	Incumbent re-elected.	▌ ✓ John J. Jenkins (Republican) 74.8%; ▌George C. Cooper (Democratic) 20.7%; ▌J. S. White (Prohibition) 2.6%; ▌W. B. Freil (Social Dem.) 2.0%

== Wyoming ==
District	Incumbent			This race	
District	Member	Party	First elected	Results	Candidates
Wyoming at-large	Frank W. Mondell	Republican	1898	Incumbent re-elected.	▌ ✓ Frank W. Mondell (Republican) 64.61%; ▌T. S. Taliaferro (Democratic) 32.21%; ▌William Brown (Socialist) 2.67%; ▌Lemuel L. Laughlin (Prohibition) 0.50%

== Non-voting delegates ==
=== Oklahoma Territory ===
District	Incumbent			This race	
District	Delegate	Party	First elected	Results	Candidates
Oklahoma Territory at-large	Bird S. McGuire	Republican	1902	Incumbent re-elected.	▌ ✓ Bird S. McGuire (Republican) 47.14%; ▌Frank Mathews (Democratic) 45.69%; ▌A. S. Loudermilk (Socialist) 4.07%; ▌R. E. Straughan (Populist) 1.68%; ▌Charles Brown (Prohibition) 1.42%

=== New Mexico Territory ===
New Mexico Territory elected its non-voting delegate November 8, 1904.

District	Incumbent			This race	
District	Delegate	Party	First elected	Results	Candidates
New Mexico Territory at-large	Bernard Shandon Rodey	Republican	1900	Incumbent lost renomination and then lost re-election as an Independent Republican. Republican hold.	▌ ✓ William Henry Andrews (Republican) 51.86%; ▌George P. Money (Democratic) 39.82%; ▌Bernard S. Rodey (Ind. Republican) 7.95%

== See also ==
- 1904 United States elections
  - 1904 United States presidential election
  - 1904–05 United States Senate elections
- 58th United States Congress
- 59th United States Congress

== Bibliography ==
- Dubin, Michael J. (March 1, 1998). United States Congressional Elections, 1788-1997: The Official Results of the Elections of the 1st Through 105th Congresses. McFarland and Company. ISBN 978-0786402830.
- Martis, Kenneth C. (January 1, 1989). The Historical Atlas of Political Parties in the United States Congress, 1789-1989. Macmillan Publishing Company. ISBN 978-0029201701.
- Moore, John L., ed. (1994). Congressional Quarterly's Guide to U.S. Elections (Third ed.). Congressional Quarterly Inc. ISBN 978-0871879967.
- "Party Divisions of the House of Representatives* 1789–Present". Office of the Historian, House of United States House of Representatives.
- Secretary of State (1905). Maryland Manual 1904. Baltimore: Wm. J. C. Dulany Co.
