= 1903 United States House of Representatives elections =

There were elections in 1903 to the United States House of Representatives:

== 57th Congress ==
Elections are listed by date and district.

District	Incumbent			This race	
District	Member	Party	First elected	Results	Candidates
New York 7	Nicholas Muller	Democratic	1876; 1880 (retired); 1882; 1886 (retired); 1898	Incumbent resigned November 2, 1901. Republican gain.	▌ ✓ Montague Lessler (Republican); [data missing]
Missouri 12	James Joseph Butler	Democratic	1900; 1902 (seat declared vacant); 1902 (special)	Election successfully challenged. Republican gain.	▌ ✓ George C. R. Wagoner (Republican); [data missing]

== 58th Congress ==
Elections are listed by date and district.

District	Incumbent			This race	
District	Member	Party	First elected	Results	Candidates
Ohio 16	Joseph J. Gill	Republican	1899	Incumbent resigned October 31, 1903. New member elected November 3, 1903. Republican hold.	▌ ✓ Capell L. Weems (Republican) 58.90%; ▌Joseph V. Lawler (Democratic) 40.57%; ▌Thomas W. Shreve (Prohibition) 2.53%
Pennsylvania 4	Robert H. Foerderer	Republican	1900	Incumbent died July 26, 1903. New member elected November 3, 1903. Republican hold.	▌ ✓ Reuben Moon (Republican) 87.28%; ▌A. Raymond Raff (Independent) 11.47%; ▌A. H. Ressler (Prohibition) 1.25%
Texas 8	Thomas H. Ball	Democratic	1896	Incumbent resigned November 16, 1903. New member elected November 17, 1903. Democratic hold.	▌ ✓ John M. Pinckney (Democratic); Unopposed
Kansas 7	Vacant			Incumbent Chester I. Long (R) resigned to take a U.S. Senate seat. New member elected May 26, 1903. Republican hold.	▌ ✓ Victor Murdock (Republican) 64.40%; ▌Charles F. Clyne (Democratic) 22.36%; ▌W. J. Babb (Populist) 9.37%
Oregon 1	Vacant			Incumbent Thomas H. Tongue (R) died January 11, 1903. New member elected June 1, 1903. Republican hold.	▌ ✓ Binger Hermann (Republican) 48.30%; ▌A. E. Regmes (Democratic) 41.14%; ▌J. W. Ingle (Socialist) 5.99%; ▌W. P. Elmore (Independent) 4.57%
Kentucky 11	Vincent Boreing	Republican	1898	Incumbent died September 16, 1903. New member elected November 10, 1903. Republican hold.	▌ ✓ W. Godfrey Hunter (Republican) 44.10%; ▌Don C. Edwards (Ind. Republican) 43.79%; ▌W. S. Stone (Independent) 4.20%
