= Charles E. Pearce =

American politician (1842–1902)

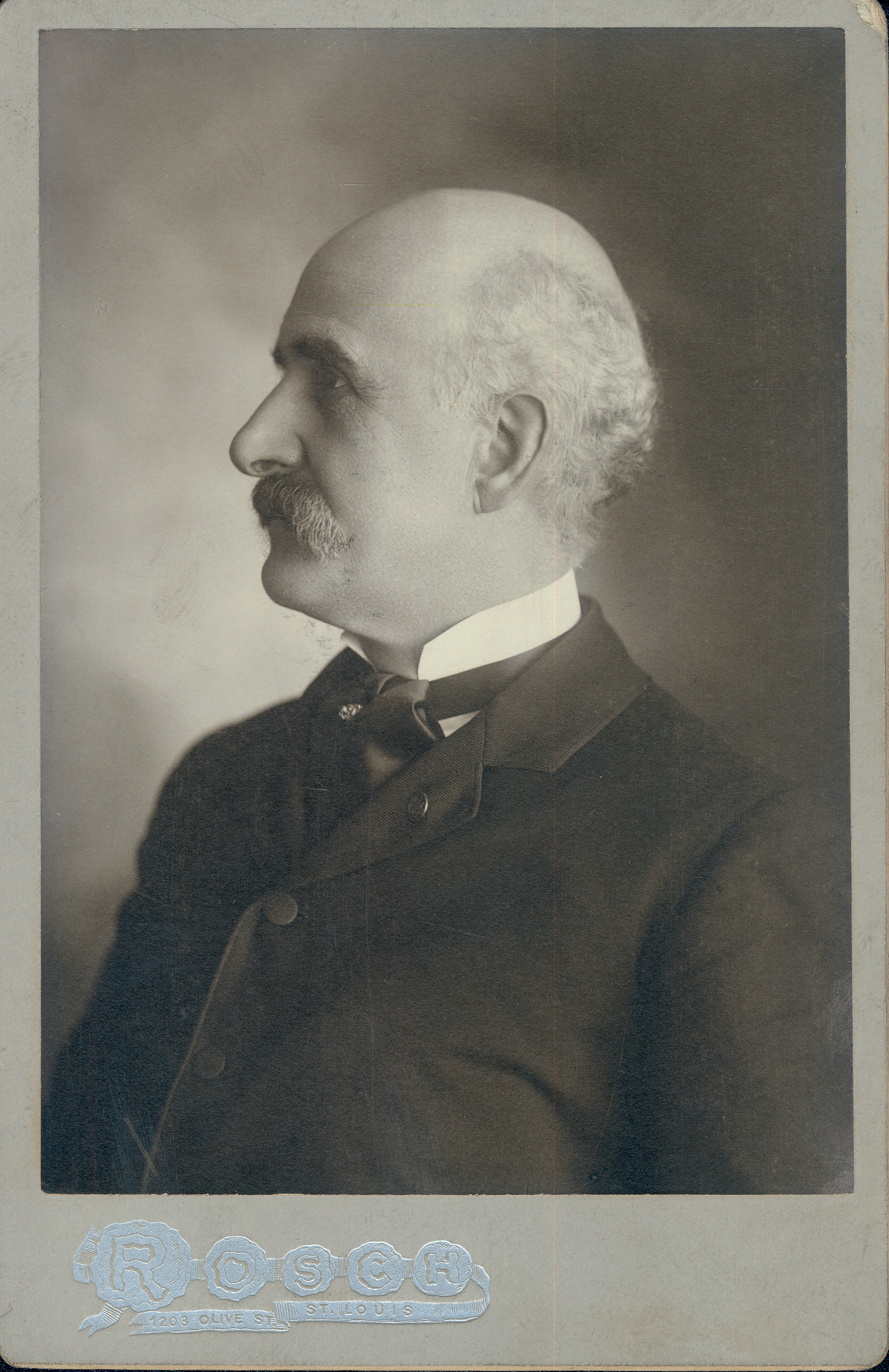
Pearce, Circa 1890. Missouri History Museum.

Charles Edward Pearce (May 29, 1842 – January 30, 1902) was a United States Congressman from Missouri. He was born in Whitesboro, Oneida County, New York. He attended Fairfield Seminary and graduated from Union College in Schenectady, New York in 1863, where he been a member of Kappa Alpha Society. He enlisted in the Union Army and was commissioned captain of Battery D, Sixteenth Regiment, New York Heavy Artillery in 1863. He was promoted to the rank of major in June 1864. On the occupation of Wilmington he was detailed as provost marshal general of the eastern district of North Carolina. He resigned from the Army in the fall of 1865; settled in St. Louis, Missouri in 1866. He studied law, was admitted to the bar in 1867 and commenced practice in St. Louis. He was also interested in the manufacture of bagging, rope, and twine. He organized and commanded the First Regiment of the Missouri National Guard in 1877. He was delegate to the Republican National Convention in 1888 and appointed chairman of the commission to treat with the Sioux Indians of the Northwest in 1891. He was elected as a Republican to the Fifty-fifth and Fifty-sixth Congresses (March 4, 1897 – March 3, 1901). He declined to be a candidate for renomination in 1900. He died in St. Louis, Missouri; interment in Fort Hill Cemetery, Auburn, New York.

U.S. House of Representatives
Preceded by Seth W. Cobb	Member of the U.S. House of Representatives from Missouri's 12th congressional district 1897–1901	Succeeded by James Joseph Butler
