= Harry M. Coudrey =

American politician (1867–1930)

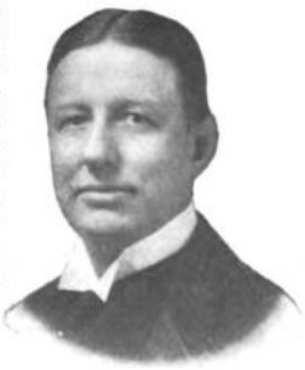

Member of the U.S. House of Representatives from Missouri's 12th district
- In office June 23, 1906 – March 3, 1911
- Preceded by: Ernest E. Wood
- Succeeded by: Leonidas C. Dyer

Personal details
- Born: Harry Marcy Coudrey; February 28, 1867 Brunswick, Missouri, U.S.
- Died: July 5, 1930 (aged 63) Norfolk, Virginia, U.S.
- Resting place: Bellefontaine Cemetery, St. Louis, Missouri, U.S.
- Party: Republican

Harry Marcy Coudrey (February 28, 1867 – July 5, 1930) was a U.S. representative from Missouri.

== Early life ==
Born in Brunswick, Missouri, to J.N. and L.H. Coudrey, Harry moved with his parents to St. Louis, Missouri, in 1878. He attended the public schools of St. Louis and was graduated from the Manual Training School at St. Louis in 1886.

== Early career ==
Coudrey worked in the insurance industry and rose rapidly through the profession. He worked as a special agent for Travelers' Insurance Company for three years following his graduation from school and he established the insurance firm of Coudrey & Scott in 1889. Coudrey & Scott was renamed Harry M. Coudrey & Company in 1901. Coudrey was elected president of the National Association of Casualty & Surety Underwriters.

In addition to his success in insurance, Coudrey was also a director of the Washington National Bank and a director and treasurer of the Universal Adding Machine Company. Other honors earned by Coudrey are: president of the St. Louis Fire Insurance Agents Association, and secretary of the St. Louis Club. He was a member of many organizations, including the Masonic fraternity, the Merchants Exchange, the Business Men's League, the Loyal Legion, and a member of the St. Louis University Club, Noonday Club, Mercantile Club, Athletic Club, Glen Echo Club, and Field Club.

== Politics ==
Coudrey was elected a member of the municipal house of delegates of St. Louis in 1897 and served for two years. He became interested in various business enterprises in St. Louis. Coudrey was at one time president of the Twenty-eight Ward Republican League Club. He successfully contested as a Republican the election of Democrat Ernest E. Wood to the Fifty-ninth Congress. During the election, there was gross fraud and Coudrey was not seated until almost the end of the Congress' first session. He was reelected to the Sixtieth and Sixty-first Congresses and served from June 23, 1906, to March 4, 1911. He was not a candidate for renomination in 1910 to the Sixty-second Congress. He moved to New York City in 1911. He engaged in the real estate, insurance, and publishing businesses.

== Later life and death ==
He died in Norfolk, Virginia, on July 5, 1930, and was interred in Bellefontaine Cemetery, in St. Louis, Missouri.

== Notes ==
U.S. House of Representatives
Preceded by Ernest E. Wood	Member of the U.S. House of Representatives from Missouri's 12th congressional district 1906–1911	Succeeded by Leonidas C. Dyer
