= George C. R. Wagoner =

American politician and businessman (1863–1946)

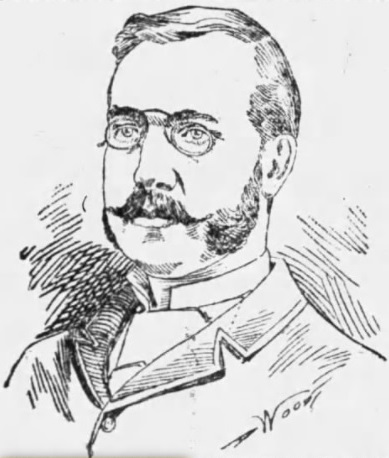
- Wagoner in an 1893 newspaper

Member of the U.S. House of Representatives from Missouri's 12th district
- In office February 26, 1903 – March 3, 1903
- Preceded by: James Joseph Butler
- Succeeded by: James Joseph Butler

Personal details
- Born: George Chester Robinson Wagoner; September 3, 1863 Cincinnati, Ohio, US
- Died: April 27, 1946 (aged 82) St. Louis, Missouri, US
- Resting place: Bellefontaine Cemetery
- Party: Republican
- Relations: Adeline Palmier Wagoner (sister-in-law)
- Parent: Sophronia Wilson Wagoner (mother)
- Occupation: Politician, businessman

George Chester Robinson Wagoner (September 3, 1863 – April 27, 1946) was an American politician and businessman. A Republican, he was a member of the United States House of Representatives from Missouri.

== Early life and education ==
Wagoner was born on September 3, 1863, in Cincinnati, the son of businessman Henry H. Wagoner and social worker Sophronia Wilson Wagoner. Educated at public schools, he studied at Beaumont Hospital Medical College.

== Career ==
Wagoner was president of the Wagoner Undertaking Company, which his father founded. With his company, he officiated the burials of Adolphus Busch, August Anheuser Busch Sr., David R. Francis, and Herbert S. Hadley, among others. He was secretary and treasurer of the H. H. Wagoner Realty Company. He lived in St. Louis.

In November 1900, Representative James Joseph Butler won his United States House of Representatives election, though was later accused of fraud and unseated. In the following special election, Wagoner, a Republican, won, though the results were challenged several times, with him being seated on the final day of the session: March 3.

Wagoner was an elected member of the House from February 26, to March 3, 1903, for a total of seven days. He represented Missouri's 12th district. During his term, he occupied seat 332. He did not run in the following election. For his day in office, he was $10,000. Ideologically, he leaned conservative.

Wagoner served from February 26, to March 3, 1903, for seven days. He was chosen to be a member as opposed to leaving the seat vacant, allowing for Congress to be put in a standstill. Writing for the St. Louis Post-Dispatch, he stated "it was not his business to be aggressive" and that his purpose was to "tie the hands of the Democrats". His term took place during an extended legislative session, during which he took the minimum recesses. He voted on 48 bills.

After serving in Congress, Wagoner returned to his businesses.

== Personal life and death ==
In 1887, Wagoner married Lulu L. Wagoner, whom he divorced in 1929. The divorce proceedings took fourteen years, reaching the Supreme Court of Missouri, with Wagoner being ordered to pay $400 per month in alimony. His brother, Harry Epply Wagoner, married Adeline Palmier Wagoner. He was a member of the Knights Templar. He died on April 27, 1946, aged 82, in St. Louis. He was buried on May 1, at Bellefontaine Cemetery.

U.S. House of Representatives
| Preceded by James Joseph Butler | Member of the U.S. House of Representatives from Missouri's 12th congressional district 1903 | Succeeded by James Joseph Butler |
