= Robert J. McGeehan =

American politician (1854–1911)

Robert J. McGeehan (August 26, 1854 – July 9, 1911) was a member of the Wisconsin State Assembly and the Wisconsin State Senate.

== Biography ==
McGeehan was born on August 26, 1854, in the Province of Canada. He moved to Wrightstown, Wisconsin, in 1870. McGeehan died on July 9, 1911, in De Pere, Wisconsin.

== Career ==
McGeehan was a member of the Assembly from 1889 to 1890 and from 1891 to 1892 and of the Senate in 1893 and from 1895 to 1896. In addition, he was an alderman of De Pere from 1893 to 1895 and mayor of De Pere, as well as a member of the Brown County, Wisconsin Board and the Wisconsin Democratic Committee.
