= Missouri's 12th congressional district =

Former U.S. House district

- Obsolete district
- Created: 1870; 1935
- Eliminated: 1930; 1950
- Years active: 1873–1933; 1935–1953

The 12th congressional district of Missouri was a congressional district for the United States House of Representatives in Missouri from 1873 to 1953.

== List of members representing the district ==
Member	Party	Years	Cong ress	Electoral history
District created March 4, 1873
John M. Glover (La Grange)	Democratic	March 4, 1873 – March 3, 1879	43rd 44th 45th	Elected in 1872. Re-elected in 1874. Re-elected in 1876. Lost renomination.
William H. Hatch (Hannibal)	Democratic	March 4, 1879 – March 3, 1883	46th 47th	Elected in 1878. Re-elected in 1880. Redistricted to the 1st district.
Charles H. Morgan (Lamar)	Democratic	March 4, 1883 – March 3, 1885	48th	Elected in 1882. Lost re-election.
William J. Stone (Nevada)	Democratic	March 4, 1885 – March 3, 1891	49th 50th 51st	Elected in 1884. Re-elected in 1886. Re-elected in 1888. Retired.
David A. De Armond (Butler)	Democratic	March 4, 1891 – March 3, 1893	52nd	Elected in 1890. Redistricted to the 6th district.
Seth W. Cobb (St. Louis)	Democratic	March 4, 1893 – March 3, 1897	53rd 54th	Redistricted from the 9th district and re-elected in 1892. Re-elected in 1894. Retired.
Charles E. Pearce (St. Louis)	Republican	March 4, 1897 – March 3, 1901	55th 56th	Elected in 1896. Re-elected in 1898. Retired.
James Joseph Butler (St. Louis)	Democratic	March 4, 1901 – June 28, 1902	57th	Elected in 1900. Seat declared Vacant.
Vacant		June 28, 1902 – November 4, 1902	57th	
James Joseph Butler (St. Louis)	Democratic	November 4, 1902 – February 26, 1903	57th	Elected to fill the vacant seat. Lost election contest.
George C. R. Wagoner (St. Louis)	Republican	February 26, 1903 – March 3, 1903	57th	Won election contest. Retired.
James Joseph Butler (St. Louis)	Democratic	March 4, 1903 – March 3, 1905	58th	Elected in 1902. Retired.
Ernest E. Wood (St. Louis)	Democratic	March 4, 1905 – June 23, 1906	59th	Elected in 1904. Lost election contest.
Harry M. Coudrey (St. Louis)	Republican	June 23, 1906 – March 3, 1911	59th 60th 61st	Won election contest. Re-elected in 1906. Re-elected in 1908. Retired.
Leonidas C. Dyer (St. Louis)	Republican	March 4, 1911 – June 19, 1914	62nd 63rd	Elected in 1910. Re-elected in 1912. Lost election contest.
Michael J. Gill (St. Louis)	Democratic	June 19, 1914 – March 3, 1915	63rd	Won election contest. Lost re-election.
Leonidas C. Dyer (St. Louis)	Republican	March 4, 1915 – March 3, 1933	64th 65th 66th 67th 68th 69th 70th 71st 72nd	Elected in 1914. Re-elected in 1916. Re-elected in 1918. Re-elected in 1920. Re-elected in 1922. Re-elected in 1924. Re-elected in 1926. Re-elected in 1928. Re-elected in 1930. Redistricted to the at-large district and lost re-election.
District inactive		March 4, 1933 – January 3, 1935	73rd	All representatives elected at-large.
James R. Claiborne (St. Louis)	Democratic	January 3, 1935 – January 3, 1937	74th	Redistricted from the at-large district and re-elected in 1934. Lost renomination.
Charles A. Anderson (St. Louis)	Democratic	January 3, 1937 – January 3, 1941	75th 76th	Elected in 1936. Re-elected in 1938. Lost re-election.
Walter C. Ploeser (Chesterfield)	Republican	January 3, 1941 – January 3, 1949	77th 78th 79th 80th	Elected in 1940. Re-elected in 1942. Re-elected in 1944. Re-elected in 1946. Lost re-election.
Raymond W. Karst (St. Louis)	Democratic	January 3, 1949 – January 3, 1951	81st	Elected in 1948. Lost re-election.
Thomas B. Curtis (Webster Groves)	Republican	January 3, 1951 – January 3, 1953	82nd	Elected in 1950. Redistricted to the 2nd district.
District eliminated January 3, 1953
