= Ernest E. Wood =

American politician (1875–1952)

Member of the U.S. House of Representatives from Missouri's 12th district
- In office March 4, 1905 – June 23, 1906
- Preceded by: James Joseph Butler
- Succeeded by: Harry M. Coudrey

Personal details
- Born: Ernest Edward Wood; August 24, 1875 Chico, California, U.S.
- Died: January 10, 1952 (aged 76) Los Angeles, California, U.S.
- Resting place: Hollywood Cemetery, Los Angeles, California, U.S.
- Party: Democratic
- Education: Stockton High School; United States Military Academy
- Profession: Politician, lawyer

Ernest Edward Wood (August 24, 1875 – January 10, 1952) was a U.S. representative from Missouri.

Born in Chico, California, Wood attended the public schools and graduated from Stockton High School in 1892. He was appointed as a cadet to the United States Military Academy at West Point in 1893 and remained two years. After studying law, Wood was admitted to the bar in 1898 and commenced practice in St. Louis, Missouri.

Wood presented his credentials as a Democratic Member-elect to the Fifty-ninth Congress and served from March 4, 1905 to June 23, 1906, when he was succeeded by Harry M. Coudrey, who contested his election. The contest, in a district that at been involved in contests each of the four proceeding elections, swung on the claim of 2300 fraudulent votes in the notorious Fourth Ward - nicknamed the "Snake Kinney" ward - when the race was decided by only 950 votes. Coudrey submitted evidence that the voting rolls were filled with people who didn't exist and whose addresses were various saloons and boarding houses. There were numerous affidavits submitted accusing Wood of coercion and bribery and in the end the House unanimously voted to remove him and replace him with Coudrey.

Wood moved to Los Angeles, California in 1907 and resumed the practice of law. He died in Los Angeles on January 10, 1952 and was interred in Hollywood Cemetery, Hollywood, California.

U.S. House of Representatives
| Preceded by James Joseph Butler | Member of the U.S. House of Representatives from Missouri's 12th congressional district 1905–1906 | Succeeded by Harry M. Coudrey |
