= James Joseph Butler =

American politician (1862–1917)

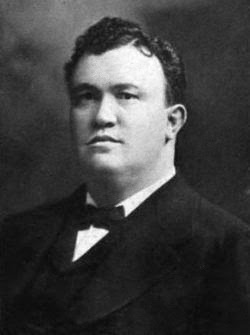

Member of the U.S. House of Representatives from Missouri's 12th district
- In office March 4, 1901 – June 28, 1902
- Preceded by: Charles E. Pearce
- Succeeded by: Vacant
- In office November 4, 1902 – February 26, 1903
- Preceded by: Vacant
- Succeeded by: George C. R. Wagoner
- In office March 4, 1903 – March 3, 1905
- Preceded by: George C. R. Wagoner
- Succeeded by: Ernest E. Wood

Personal details
- Born: August 29, 1862 St. Louis, Missouri, U.S.
- Died: May 31, 1917 (aged 54) St. Louis, Missouri, U.S.
- Resting place: Calvary Cemetery, St. Louis, Missouri, U.S.
- Party: Democratic
- Education: Saint Louis University; Washington University in St. Louis
- Occupation: Politician, attorney, blacksmith

James Joseph Butler (August 29, 1862 – May 31, 1917) was a U.S. representative from Missouri.

Born in St. Louis, Missouri, Butler attended the public schools. He served an apprenticeship as a blacksmith, and worked at that trade for several years. He graduated from Saint Louis University in 1881. He studied law at Washington University in St. Louis. He was admitted to the bar in 1884 and commenced practice in St. Louis, Missouri. He served as city attorney of St. Louis from 1886 to 1894. Presented credentials as a Democratic Member-elect to the Fifty-seventh Congress and served from March 4, 1901, until June 28, 1902, when the seat was declared vacant. Subsequently presented credentials as a Member-elect to fill the vacancy thus caused and served from November 4, 1902, until February 26, 1903, when he was succeeded by George Chester Robinson Wagoner, who contested his election.

Butler was elected as a Democrat to the Fifty-eighth Congress (March 4, 1903 – March 3, 1905). He served as delegate to the Democratic National Conventions in 1904 and 1908. He resumed the practice of law in St. Louis, Missouri, and died there May 31, 1917. He was interred in Calvary Cemetery.

U.S. House of Representatives
Preceded by Charles E. Pearce	Member of the U.S. House of Representatives from Missouri's 12th congressional district March 4, 1901 – June 28, 1902	Succeeded by Vacant
Preceded by Vacant	Member of the U.S. House of Representatives from Missouri's 12th congressional district November 4, 1902 – February 26, 1903	Succeeded by George C. R. Wagoner
Preceded by George C. R. Wagoner	Member of the U.S. House of Representatives from Missouri's 12th congressional district March 4, 1903 – March 3, 1905	Succeeded by Ernest E. Wood
