= Záboří =

Záboří may refer to places in the Czech Republic:

- Záboří (České Budějovice District), a municipality and village in the South Bohemian Region
- Záboří (Strakonice District), a municipality and village in the South Bohemian Region
- Záboří nad Labem, a municipality and village in the Central Bohemian Region
- Záboří, a village and part of Kly (Mělník District) in the Central Bohemian Region
- Záboří, a village and part of Proseč in the Pardubice Region
- Záboří, a village and part of Protivín in the South Bohemian Region
- Záboří, a village and part of Vítězná in the Hradec Králové Region
