= Igoe =

Igoe is a surname. Notable people with the surname include:

- James T. Igoe, member of the United States House of Representatives, 1927–1932
- Michael L. Igoe, member of the United States House of Representatives, 1935–1936
- Sammy Igoe, English footballer
- William L. Igoe, member of the United States House of Representatives, 1913–1921
- Tommy Igoe, drummer and music educator, 1964–
- Wee Lauren Igoe, teacher from Glasgow, 1992-

== See also ==
- Pruitt–Igoe, a housing project of St. Louis, Missouri
