= Kly =

KLY or kly may refer to:

- kly, kilolight-year
- Kly (Mělník District), Central Bohemian Region, Czech Republic
- ISO 639-3 code of Kalao language from Indonesia
- Kalaw Lagaw Ya, an indigenous Australian language
- Kenley railway station, London
