= William Lorimer (politician) =

American politician (1861–1934)

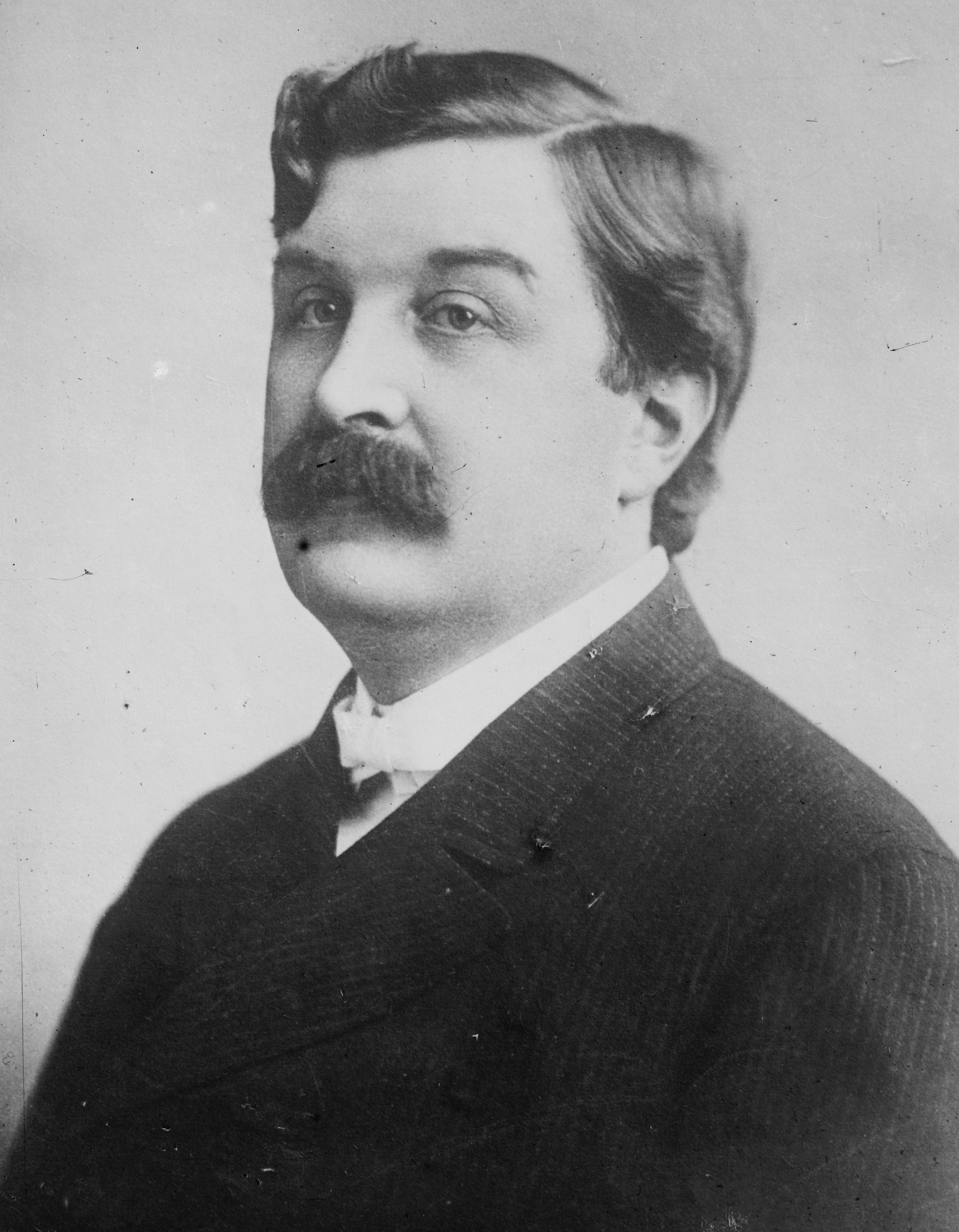
- Lorimer, c. 1921

United States Senator from Illinois
- In office June 18, 1909 – July 13, 1912
- Preceded by: Albert J. Hopkins
- Succeeded by: Lawrence Sherman

Member of the U.S. House of Representatives from Illinois
- In office March 4, 1903 – June 17, 1909
- Preceded by: Henry Boutell
- Succeeded by: William Moxley
- Constituency: 6th district
- In office March 4, 1895 – March 3, 1901
- Preceded by: Lawrence E. McGann
- Succeeded by: John J. Feely
- Constituency: 2nd district

Personal details
- Born: April 27, 1861 Manchester, England, UK
- Died: September 13, 1934 (aged 73) Chicago, Illinois, U.S.
- Resting place: Calvary Cemetery
- Party: Republican

William Lorimer (April 27, 1861 – September 13, 1934) was an American Republican politician who represented Illinois in the United States House of Representatives and United States Senate. In 1912, however, the Senate expelled Lorimer, holding that his election was invalid due to his use of corrupt methods and practices, including bribery of state legislators. Lorimer was known as the "Blond Boss" of Chicago.

== Biography ==
Lorimer was born in Manchester, England. His family immigrated to the United States in 1866, first settling in Michigan and then moving to Chicago in 1870. Lorimer was self-educated. He had been apprenticed to a sign painter when he was ten. He worked in the Chicago meat-packing houses and for a street railroad company.

In 1894, Lorimer was elected to the first of two non-consecutive tenures (1895-1901, 1903–1909) in the U.S. House of Representatives. In 1909, he helped to engineer the blocking of the re-election of U.S. Senator Albert J. Hopkins, a Republican who had been Lorimer's ally but was now a political foe. With Hopkins's re-election bid finished, Lorimer seemed surprised when a coalition of 55 Illinois State House Republicans and 53 State House Democrats pushed his name to fill the now-vacant seat in the U.S. Senate. At the time, U.S. Senators were elected by state legislatures. Lorimer's name went before the State Senate, and, after a contentious campaign, he was elected to the U.S. Senate. He took his seat in March 1909.

In 1910, The Chicago Tribune published an admission by Charles A. White, a Democratic member of the Illinois House of Representatives, that Lorimer had paid $1,000 for White's vote in the election.

On July 13, 1912, after two Senate investigations and acrimonious debate, the U.S. Senate adopted a resolution declaring "that corrupt methods and practices were employed in his election, and that the election, therefore, was invalid." Lorimer was excluded from office.

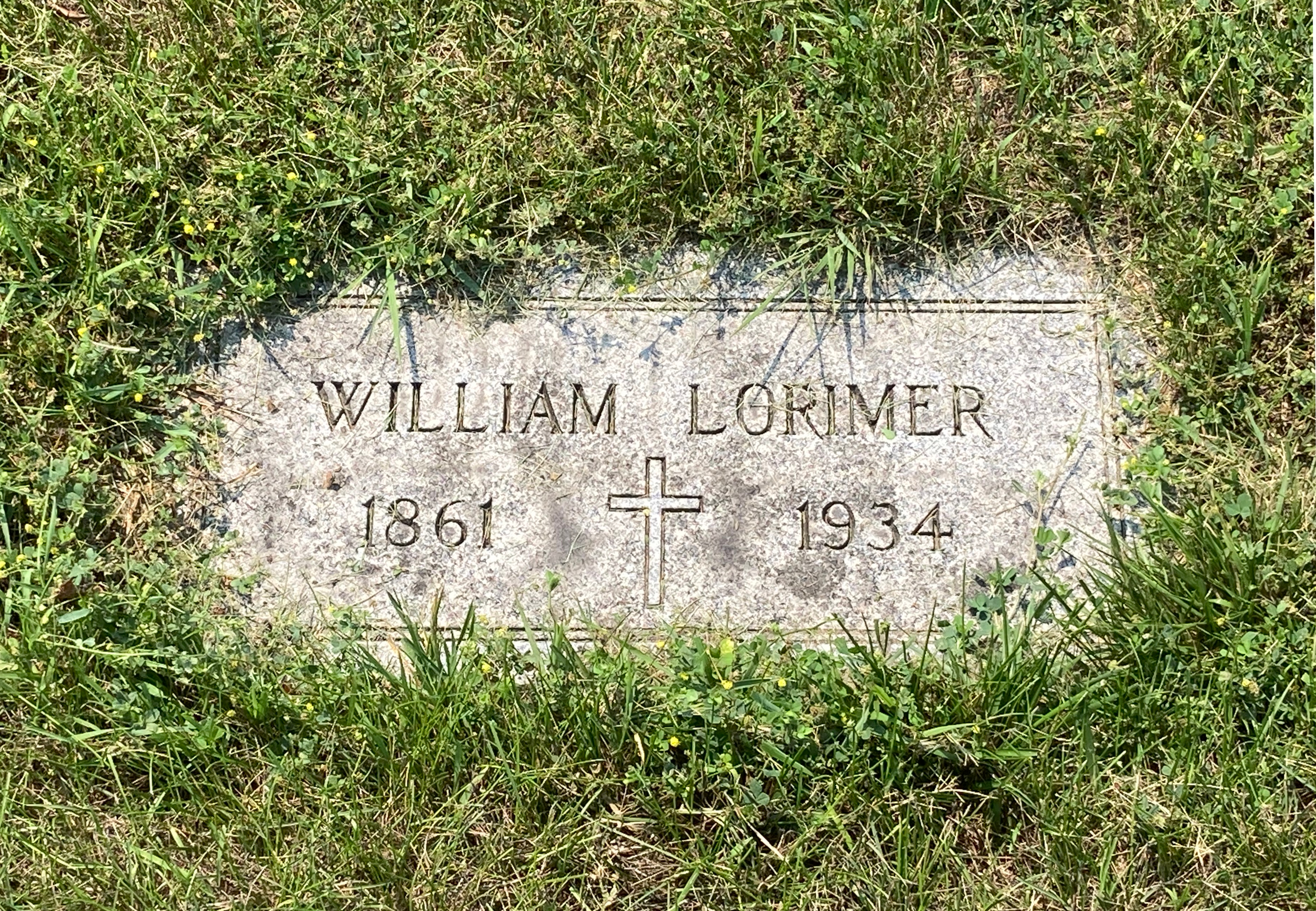
Lorimer's grave at Calvary Cemetery

Many in Chicago believed that Lorimer's ouster was politically inspired and that he was wrongfully deprived of his seat. Such corruption nationwide led to the passage, in May 1912, of the Seventeenth Amendment to the U.S. Constitution, providing for direct election of U.S. Senators.

When he returned to Chicago, he was greeted by a parade and a throng at a meeting in Orchestra Hall. One of the speakers at the meeting was attorney Charles Lederer of Adler & Lederer (now known as Arnstein & Lehr, LLP) and a former member of the Illinois General Assembly. He presented a resolution to the meeting reciting the wrong done to Mr. Lorimer, his fight for his seat and the faith of his friends in him.

Lorimer served as president of La Salle Street Trust & Savings Bank from 1910 to 1915, and then entered the lumber business. He died in Chicago at age 73, and was buried at Calvary Cemetery in Evanston.

== See also ==
- List of federal political scandals in the United States
- List of United States senators born outside the United States

U.S. House of Representatives
Preceded by Lawrence E. McGann	Member of the U.S. House of Representatives from Illinois's 2nd congressional district 1895–1901	Succeeded by John J. Feely
Preceded by Henry Boutell	Member of the U.S. House of Representatives from Illinois's 6th congressional district 1903–1909	Succeeded by William Moxley
U.S. Senate
Preceded by Albert J. Hopkins	U.S. Senator (Class 3) from Illinois; 1909–1912; Served alongside: Shelby Moore Cullom	Succeeded by Lawrence Sherman
