= A. F. Maciejewski =

American politician

Anton F. Maciejewski
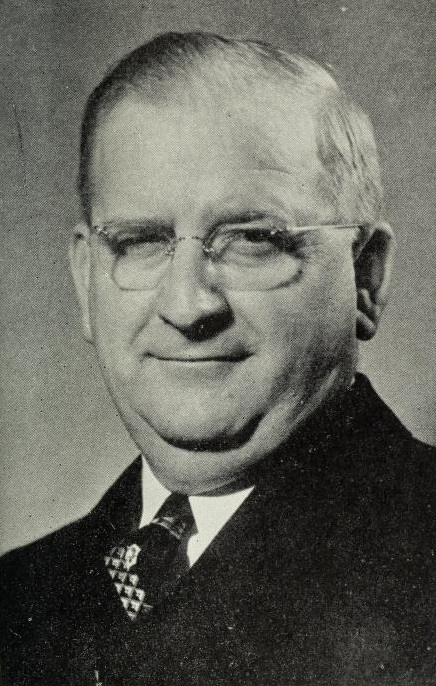
- From 1927's Poles of Chicago, 1837-1937

Member of the U.S. House of Representatives from Illinois's 6th district
- In office January 3, 1939 – December 8, 1942
- Preceded by: Thomas J. O'Brien
- Succeeded by: Thomas J. O'Brien

Personal details
- Born: Anton Frank Maciejewski; January 3, 1893 Anderson, Texas
- Died: September 25, 1949 (aged 56) Chicago, Illinois
- Resting place: Resurrection Cemetery, Justice, Illinois
- Party: Democratic

Anton Frank Maciejewski (January 3, 1893 – September 25, 1949) was an American businessman and politician who served as a U.S. Representative from Illinois from 1939 to 1942.

== Biography ==
Born in Anderson, Texas, Maciejewski attended the public schools of Cicero, Illinois, and Lewis Institute, Chicago. He became engaged in the wholesale and retail coal business in Cicero, in 1916. He served as assistant agent in charge of relief of Cook County, Illinois from 1925 to 1928. He served as member of the Democratic State and National Committees. He served as a delegate to the Democratic National Convention in 1928, and as supervisor and treasurer of Cicero, Illinois from 1932 to 1939.

=== Congress ===
Maciejewski was elected as a Democrat to the Seventy-sixth and Seventy-seventh Congresses and served from January 3, 1939, until his resignation on December 8, 1942. He was not a candidate for renomination in 1942.

=== Later career and death ===
After his service in Congress, Maciejewski resumed the wholesale and retail coal business. He also engaged in the construction of defense housing.

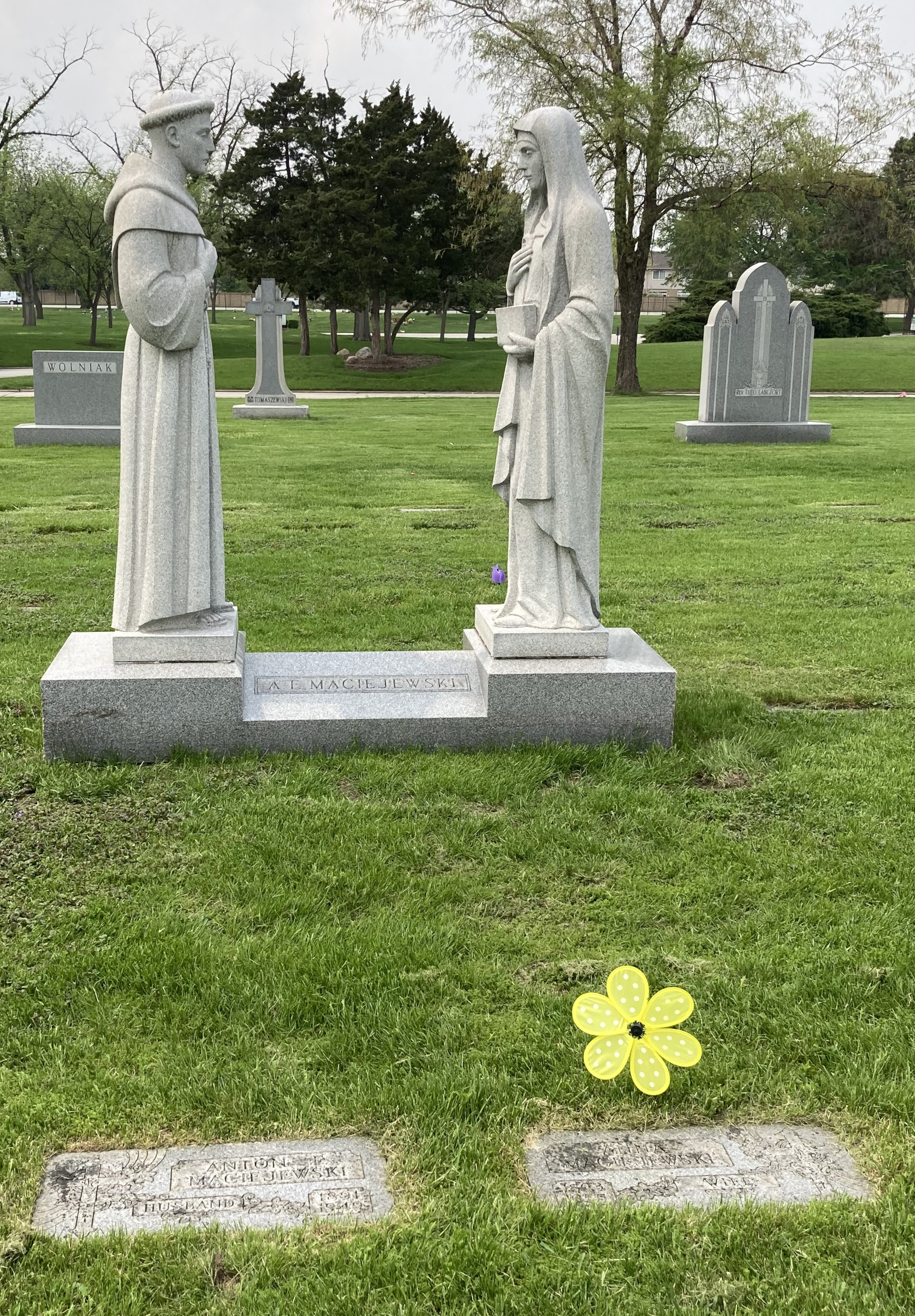
Maciejewski's grave at Resurrection Cemetery

Maciejewski was elected to the board of trustees of the sanitary district of Chicago in December 1942 and served until his death in Chicago, September 25, 1949. He was interred in Resurrection Cemetery, Justice, Illinois.

U.S. House of Representatives
Preceded by Thomas J. O'Brien	Member of the U.S. House of Representatives from Illinois's 6th congressional district January 3, 1939 – December 8, 1942	Succeeded by Vacant
