= Henry Sherman Boutell =

American politician

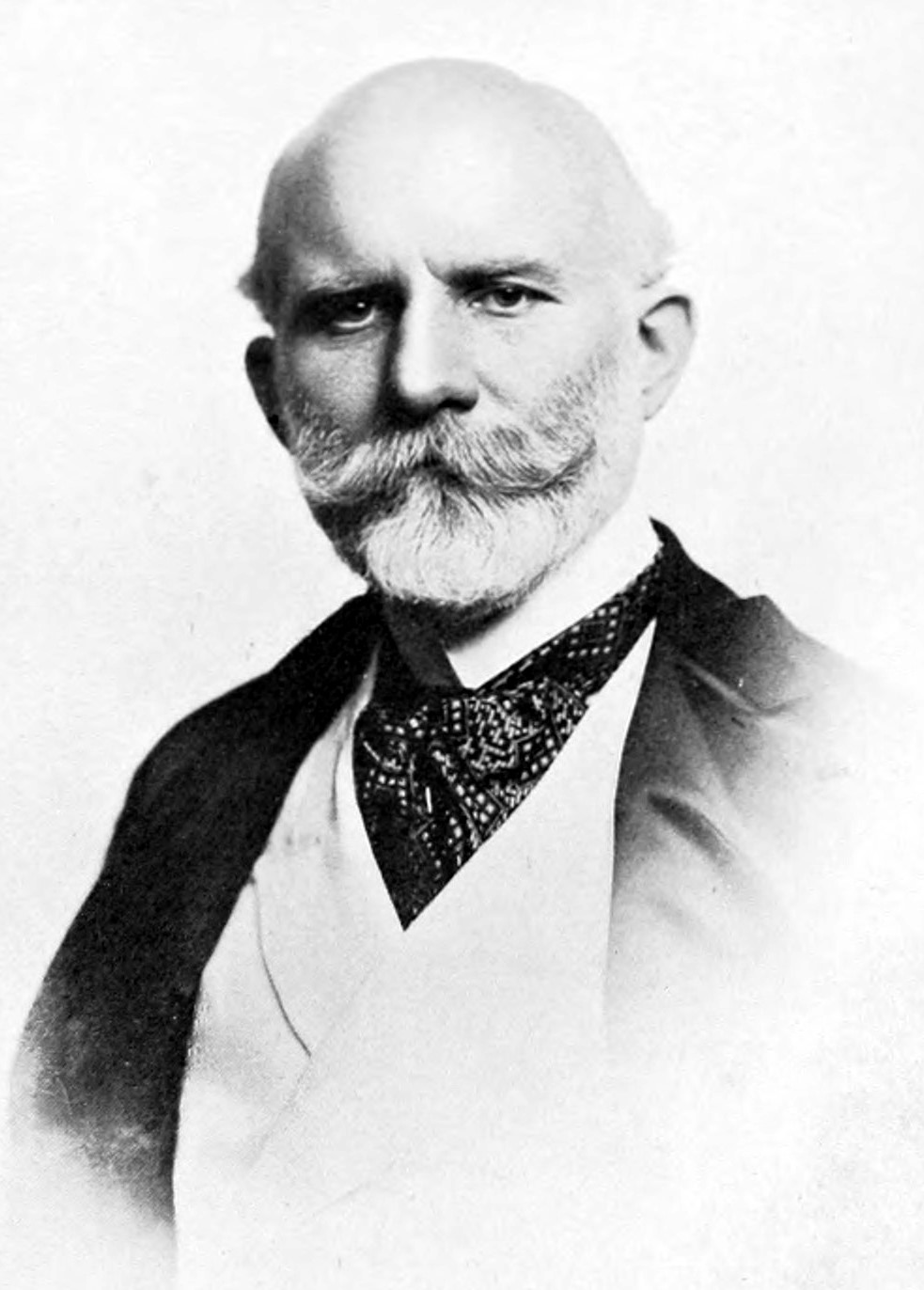
- Henry Sherman Boutell ca. 1910

Member of the U.S. House of Representatives from Illinois
- In office November 23, 1897 – March 3, 1911
- Preceded by: Edward D. Cooke
- Succeeded by: Lynden Evans
- Constituency: 6th district (1897–1903); 9th district (1903–11)

Personal details
- Born: March 14, 1856 Boston, Massachusetts, U.S.
- Died: March 11, 1926 (aged 69) Sanremo, Italy
- Party: Republican

Henry Sherman Boutell (March 14, 1856 – March 11, 1926) was an American lawyer and diplomat. He became a Congressman from Illinois, and Envoy Extraordinary and Minister Plenipotentiary to Portugal by President William Howard Taft.

== Biography ==
Boutell was born at Boston, Massachusetts, the son of Lewis Henry and Anna (Greene) Boutell. A colonial ancestry entitled him to membership in the Sons of the American Revolution and in the Society of Colonial Wars. He was also an hereditary member of the Military Order of the Loyal Legion of the United States.

His college education was secured at Northwestern (A.B. 1874, M.A. 1879) and Harvard (A.B. 1876, A.M. 1877). After studying law in an office, in 1879 he was admitted to the bar and began practice in Chicago. Although both able and prominent as an attorney, representing, for example, the Baltimore and Ohio Railroad in securing a right of way into Chicago, and in the erection of its terminal there, his tastes from the beginning ran to public life, and he was soon both active and useful as a worker in the Republican Party.

In 1884, he was a member of the lower house of the state legislature, and from 1897 to 1911 a representative of Chicago districts in Congress. There he was a member of the committees on Rules, and on Ways and Means, and was chairman of the Committee on Expenditures of the Navy. He was an effective speaker and of considerable influence, but his tariff views were unacceptable to business interests in Chicago, which forced his retirement. President William Howard Taft then appointed him to the post of Envoy Extraordinary and Minister Plenipotentiary to Portugal, on March 2, 1911. He never assumed its duties, and on April 24, 1911, he was given a similar appointment to Switzerland. In this post he served from May 17, 1911, to July 31, 1913.

He did not find the diplomatic service to his liking, and resigned. Before he did so he had declined the chief justiceship of the United States court of claims tendered him by President Taft (January 1913). With this his public career ended, except for service (November 1913) as chairman of a board of arbitration which settled an important dispute between the operatives and officers of the Chicago, Burlington and Quincy Railroad. From 1914 to 1923, he taught constitutional law and international law in Georgetown University, in Washington, D.C.

He was short of stature, very erect and dignified of carriage, alert in movement. Distinctly of the scholarly type, he was very widely read, and active, so long as he resided in Chicago, in the Literary Club of that city. His speeches, which reflected his reading, were always graceful and sometimes eloquent. In his political opinions he was fairly liberal, but in the regulation of purely personal affairs and conduct he was notably conservative. He was a rare combination of force and urbanity. Although unfailingly careful to avoid giving offense to anybody with whom he came in contact, invariably gracious, and charming in manner, his opinions were not lacking in definiteness, and he was not in any way colorless. These qualities should have won him great distinction either in law or diplomacy, but in politics they left him merely a staunch and dependable "party" man, whose mental independence and natural talents were hampered by party platforms. He did not win in public life the renown of which his abilities and early professional success gave promise. On December 29, 1880, he was married to Euphemia Lucia Clara Gates of Providence, Rhode Island. He died at Sanremo, Italy. Several children survived him.

He was the great nephew of William M. Evarts, great-grandson of Jeremiah Evarts and the great-great-grandson of Roger Sherman. His father Lewis Henry Boutell (July 21, 1826 – January 16, 1899) wrote the book, The Life of Roger Sherman (Chicago: A.C. McClurg and Co., 1896)

U.S. House of Representatives
Preceded by Edward D. Cooke	Member of the U.S. House of Representatives from Illinois's 6th congressional district November 23, 1897 – March 3, 1903	Succeeded by William Lorimer
Preceded by Robert R. Hitt	Member of the U.S. House of Representatives from Illinois's 9th congressional district March 4, 1903 – March 3, 1911	Succeeded by Lynden Evans
