= James McAndrews =

American politician (1862-1942)

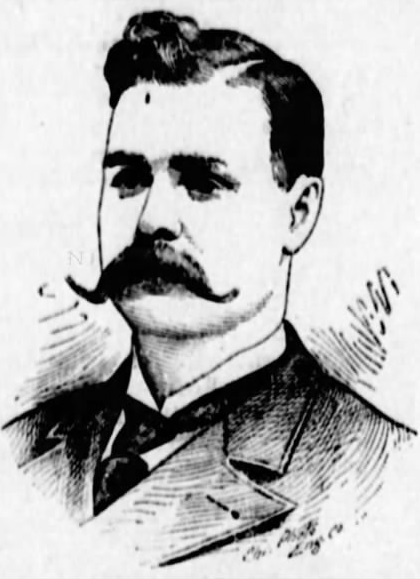
- Chicago Eagle newspaper, June 7, 1913

Member of the U.S. House of Representatives from Illinois
- In office January 3, 1935 – January 3, 1941
- Preceded by: Frederick A. Britten
- Succeeded by: Charles S. Dewey
- Constituency: 9th district
- In office March 4, 1913 – March 3, 1921
- Preceded by: Edmund J. Stack
- Succeeded by: John J. Gorman
- Constituency: 6th district
- In office March 4, 1901 – March 3, 1905
- Preceded by: Thomas Cusack
- Succeeded by: Anthony Michalek
- Constituency: 4th district (1901–1903); 5th district (1903–1905)

Personal details
- Born: October 22, 1862 Woonsocket, Rhode Island, U.S.
- Died: August 31, 1942 (aged 79) Chicago, Illinois, U.S.
- Party: Democratic

James McAndrews (October 22, 1862 – August 31, 1942) was a U.S. representative from Illinois.

Born in Woonsocket, Rhode Island, McAndrews attended the common schools. He moved to Chicago, Illinois, and engaged in business, serving as building commissioner of Chicago.

McAndrews was elected as a Democrat to the Fifty-seventh and Fifty-eighth Congresses (March 4, 1901 – March 3, 1905). He was then elected to the Sixty-third and to the three succeeding Congresses (March 4, 1913 – March 3, 1921). He was an unsuccessful candidate for reelection in 1920 to the Sixty-seventh Congress, and instead resumed his business activities. He was also an unsuccessful candidate for election in 1932 to the Seventy-third Congress.

McAndrews was elected to the Seventy-fourth, Seventy-fifth, and Seventy-sixth Congresses (January 3, 1935 – January 3, 1941). He was an unsuccessful candidate for reelection in 1940 to the Seventy-seventh Congress. He died in Chicago, Illinois, and was interred in Calvary Cemetery, Evanston, Illinois.

U.S. House of Representatives
Preceded by Thomas Cusack	Member of the U.S. House of Representatives from Illinois's 4th congressional district 1901–1903	Succeeded by George P. Foster
Preceded by William F. Mahoney	Member of the U.S. House of Representatives from Illinois's 5th congressional district 1903–1905	Succeeded by Anthony Michalek
Preceded by Edmund J. Stack	Member of the U.S. House of Representatives from Illinois's 6th congressional district 1913–1921	Succeeded by John J. Gorman
Preceded by Frederick A. Britten	Member of the U.S. House of Representatives from Illinois's 9th congressional district 1935–1941	Succeeded by Charles S. Dewey
