= Thomas J. O'Brien (Illinois politician) =

American politician

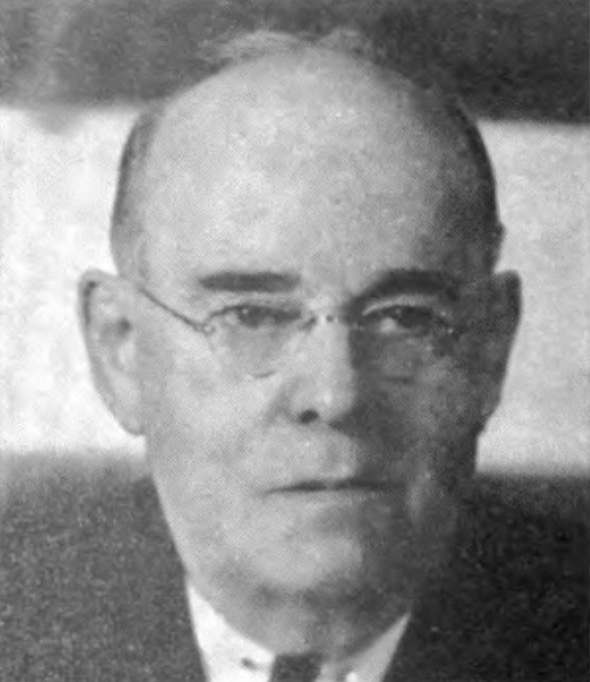

Member of the U.S. House of Representatives from Illinois's 6th district
- In office January 3, 1943 – April 14, 1964
- Preceded by: A. F. Maciejewski
- Succeeded by: Daniel J. Ronan
- In office March 4, 1933 – January 3, 1939
- Preceded by: James T. Igoe
- Succeeded by: A. F. Maciejewski

Cook County Sheriff
- In office 1938–1942
- Preceded by: John Toman
- Succeeded by: A. L. Brodie

Personal details
- Born: April 30, 1878 Chicago, Illinois
- Died: April 14, 1964 (aged 85) Bethesda, Maryland
- Resting place: Queen of Heaven Cemetery
- Party: Democratic

Thomas Joseph O'Brien (April 30, 1878 – April 14, 1964) of Chicago was a U.S. representative from Illinois, 1933–39, 1943–64, and as Cook County Sheriff from 1938 through 1942. He was a liberal member of the Democratic Party. He became the "Dean" of Chicago delegates and played a role in the early career of Dan Rostenkowski.

O'Brien died in office of a stroke on April 14, 1964, and was buried at Queen of Heaven Cemetery in Hillside, Illinois.

The T.J. O'Brien Lock and Dam approximately 7 miles from Lake Michigan on the Calumet River in Chicago at the head of the Illinois Waterway is named after Congressman O'Brien.

== See also ==
- List of members of the United States Congress who died in office (1950–1999)

U.S. House of Representatives
Preceded by James T. Igoe	Member of the U.S. House of Representatives from Illinois's 6th congressional district March 4, 1933 – January 3, 1939	Succeeded by A. F. Maciejewski
Preceded by A. F. Maciejewski	Member of the U.S. House of Representatives from Illinois's 6th congressional district January 3, 1943 – April 14, 1964	Succeeded by Daniel J. Ronan
Honorary titles
Preceded by Brent Spence	Oldest member of the U.S. House of Representatives; 1963–1964	Succeeded by Clarence Cannon
