= John J. Gorman =

American politician

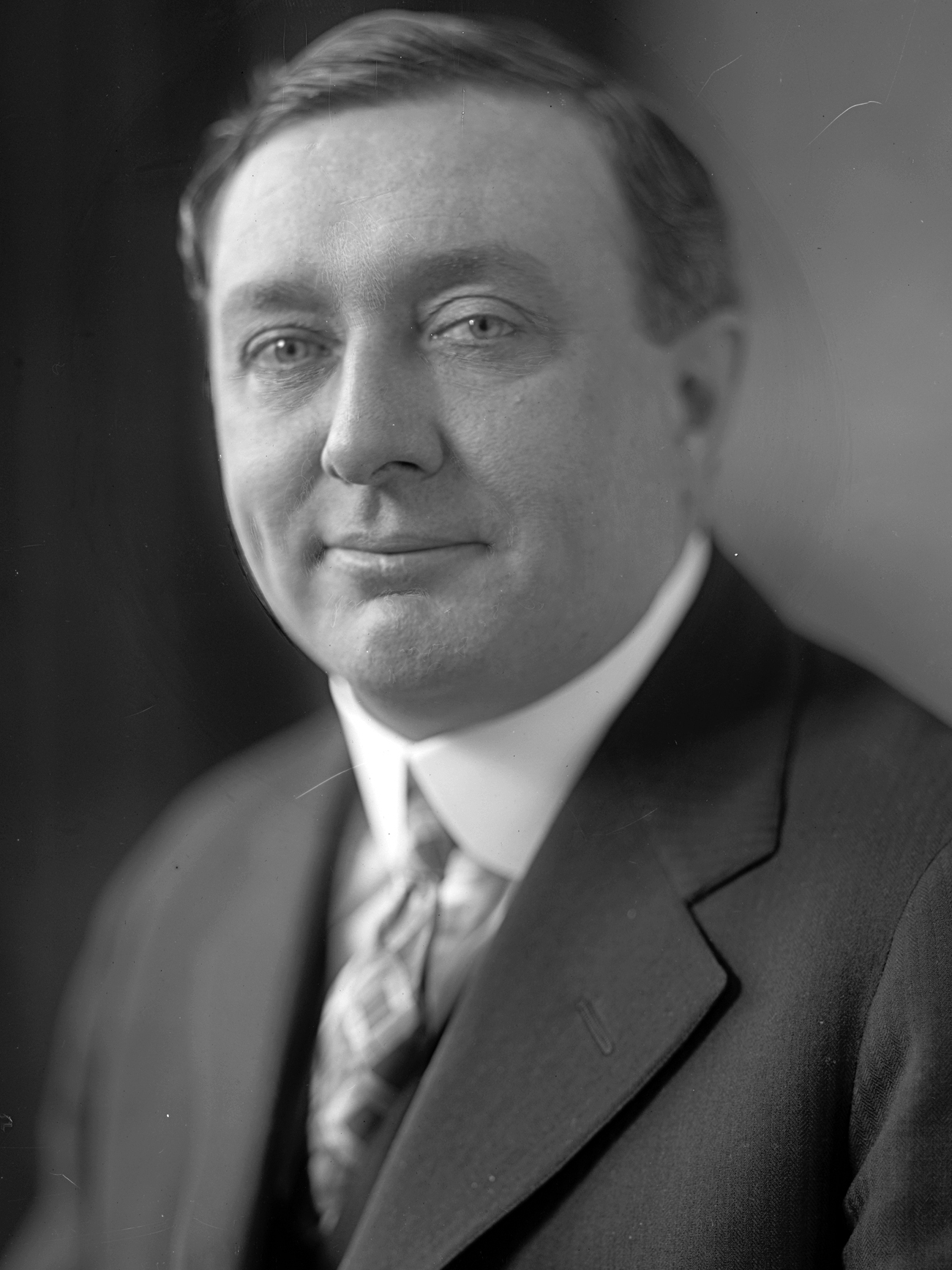

Member of the U.S. House of Representatives from Illinois's 6th district
- In office March 4, 1925 – March 3, 1927
- Preceded by: James R. Buckley
- Succeeded by: James T. Igoe
- In office March 4, 1921 – March 3, 1923
- Preceded by: James McAndrews
- Succeeded by: James R. Buckley

Personal details
- Born: June 2, 1883 Minneapolis, Minnesota, U.S.
- Died: February 24, 1949 (aged 65) Chicago, Illinois, U.S.
- Party: Republican

John Jerome Gorman (June 2, 1883 – February 24, 1949) was a U.S. representative from Illinois as a Republican.

Born in Minneapolis, Minnesota, Gorman attended the common schools and the Bryant and Stratton Business College at Chicago, Illinois. He served as clerk and letter carrier in the Chicago city post office 1902-1918. He studied law at Loyola University Chicago School of Law and graduated in 1914. He was admitted to the bar in 1914 and commenced practice in Chicago. He served as delegate to the State constitutional convention in 1920.

Gorman was elected as a Republican to the Sixty-seventh Congress (March 4, 1921 – March 3, 1923). He was an unsuccessful candidate for reelection, losing to Democrat James R. Buckley. He ran again in 1924, and defeated Buckley to be elected to the Sixty-ninth Congress (March 4, 1925 – March 3, 1927). However, he was again an unsuccessful candidate for reelection, losing this time to Democrat James T. Igoe. He resumed the practice of law in Chicago following his second defeat.

On April 14, 1927, Chicago Mayor William Hale Thompson appointed former U.S. congressman Gorman as a special assistant corporation counsel, with the assignment of looking through school textbooks for lies and distortions. Thompson had been accusing Superintendent of Chicago Public Schools William McAndrew of conspiring with Great Britain to spread propaganda to indoctrinate students against the United States. Gorman, who was considered an Anglophobe, reached the conclusion that books used by Chicago Public Schools were "poisoned" with British dogma, and that the British were taking over America, "not by shot and shell, but by a rain of propaganda." This would echo charges levied in the administrative hearing of William McAndrew before the Chicago Board of Education. As a witness during McAndrew's administrative hearing, Gorman accused McAndrew of placing British propaganda in the school curriculum, and attacked McAndrew for the use of a textbook written by David Saville Muzzey. Facing a defamation suit by Muzzey for this character, Gorman would later write an apology letter to Muzzey on October 11, 1929, admitting that he had never actually read that textbook and that the sworn statements he had made were, in fact, written by someone else. He claimed to have been misled, and to have now realized there was nothing to criticize in Muzzey's textbooks. As a consequence of this perjury, Gorman was disbarred by the Supreme Court of Illinois in December 1931.

After his death in Chicago in 1949, he was interred in All Saints Cemetery in Des Plaines.

U.S. House of Representatives
Preceded by James McAndrews	Member of the U.S. House of Representatives from Illinois's 6th congressional district 1921–1923	Succeeded by James R. Buckley
Preceded by James R. Buckley	Member of the U.S. House of Representatives from Illinois's 6th congressional district 1925–1927	Succeeded by James T. Igoe
