= Illinois's 6th congressional district =

U.S. House district for Illinois

Coordinates: 42°10′30″N 88°13′12″W

- Interactive map of district boundaries since January 3, 2023
- Representative: Sean Casten; D–Downers Grove
- Area: 230.0 mi^{2} (596 km^{2})
- Distribution: 99.4% urban; 0.6% rural
- Population (2025): 737,571
- Median household income: $99,847
- Ethnicity: 72.1% White; 13.6% Hispanic; 5.8% Asian; 5.3% Black; 2.7% Two or more races; 0.4% other
- Cook PVI: D+3

Illinois' 6th congressional district covers parts of Cook and DuPage counties. It has been represented by Democrat Sean Casten since 2019.

== Composition ==
For the 118th and successive Congresses (based on redistricting following the 2020 census), the district contains all or portions of the following counties, townships, and municipalities:

Cook County (38)

Alsip (part, also 1st), Bedford Park, Bridgeview, Bremen Township (part, also 1st), Burbank (part, also 4th), Burr Ridge (part, also 11th; shared with DuPage County), Chicago (part, also 1st, 2nd, 3rd, 4th, 5th, 7th, 8th, and 9th; shared with DuPage County), Chicago Ridge, Countryside, Crestwood (part, also 1st), Evergreen Park (part, also 1st), Hickory Hills, Hinsdale (part, also 4th; shared with DuPage County), Hodgkins, Hometown, Indian Head Park, Justice, La Grange (part, also 4th), Lyons Township (part, also 4th), Merrionette Park, Midlothian (part, also 1st), Oak Forest (part, also 1st), Oak Lawn (part, also 4th), Orland Hills, Orland Park (part, also 1st), Orland Township (part, also 1st), Palos Heights, Palos Hills, Palos Park, Palos Township, Robbins (part, also 1st), Stickney Township (part, also 4th), Summit (part, also 4th), Tinley Park (part, also 1st), Western Springs, Willow Springs (part, also 11th), Worth, Worth Township (part, also 1st)

DuPage County (21)

Addison (part, also 3rd), Addison Township (part, also 3rd), Burr Ridge (part, also 11th; shared with Cook County), Clarendon Hills (part, also 4th), Darien (part, also 11th), Downers Grove, Downers Grove Township (part, also 11th), Elmhurst (part, also 4th), Glen Ellyn (part, also 3rd), Lisle (part, also 11th), Lisle Township (part, also 11th), Lombard (part, also 3rd), Milton Township (part, also 3rd), Oak Brook (part, also 4th), Oakbrook Terrace, Villa Park, Willowbrook, Westmont, Wheaton (part, also 3rd), Woodbridge (part, also 11th), York Township (part, also 4th)

Chicago neighborhoods in the 6th district include:

- Beverly (part)
- Clearing (part)
- Garfield Ridge (part)
- Mount Greenwood (part)

== Recent election results from statewide races ==
| Year | Office | Results |
|---|---|---|
| 2008 | President | Obama 54% - 45% |
| 2012 | President | Obama 51% - 49% |
| 2016 | President | Clinton 51% - 42% |
| 2016 | Senate | Duckworth 50% - 44% |
| 2016 | Comptroller (Spec.) | Munger 51% - 42% |
| 2018 | Governor | Pritzker 50% - 45% |
| 2018 | Attorney General | Raoul 50% - 47% |
| 2018 | Secretary of State | White 68% - 30% |
| 2018 | Comptroller | Mendoza 57% - 40% |
| 2018 | Treasurer | Frerichs 53% - 44% |
| 2020 | President | Biden 55% - 44% |
| 2020 | Senate | Durbin 53% - 41% |
| 2022 | Senate | Duckworth 55% - 43% |
| 2022 | Governor | Pritzker 53% - 44% |
| 2022 | Attorney General | Raoul 53% - 45% |
| 2022 | Secretary of State | Giannoulias 54% - 44% |
| 2022 | Comptroller | Mendoza 56% - 42% |
| 2022 | Treasurer | Frerichs 52% - 46% |
| 2024 | President | Harris 51% - 45% |

== History ==
=== 2011 redistricting ===
After the 2011 redistricting which followed the 2010 census, the district included portions of Cook, DuPage, Kane, Lake and McHenry counties. All or parts of Algonquin, Barrington, Barrington Hills, Bartlett, Burr Ridge, Carol Stream, Carpentersville, Cary, Clarendon Hills, Crystal Lake, Darien, Deer Park, Downers Grove, Elgin, East Dundee, Forest Lake, Fox River Grove, Gilberts, Illinois, Glen Ellyn, Hawthorn Woods, Hinsdale, Hoffman Estates, Inverness, Kildeer, Lake Barrington, Lake in the Hills, Lake Zurich, Lakewood, Lisle, Lombard, Long Grove, Naperville, North Barrington, Oak Brook, Oakbrook Terrace, Oakwood Hills, Palatine, Port Barrington, Rolling Meadows, Sleepy Hollow, South Barrington, South Elgin, St. Charles, Tower Lakes, Trout Valley, Warrenville, Wayne, West Chicago, West Dundee, Westmont, Wheaton, Willowbrook and Winfield are included.

=== Prominent representatives ===
| Representative | Notes |
|---|---|
| Thompson Campbell | Elected the 9th Illinois Secretary of State (1843–1846) |
| Thomas L. Harris | Served as a major for the U.S. Army during the Mexican–American War (1846–1847) |
| Edward Dickinson Baker | Served as a colonel for the U.S. Army during the Mexican–American War (1846–1847); Elected United States Senator from Oregon (1860–1861); Served as a colonel for the Union Army during the American Civil War (1861) |
| John Alexander McClernand | Served as a brigadier general and major general of the Union Army during the American Civil War (1861–1864) |
| Richard Yates | Elected the 13th Illinois Governor (1861–1865); Elected United States Senator from Illinois (1865–1871) |
| Robert R. Hitt | Appointed the 13th United States Assistant Secretary of State (1881); Served as a regent of the Smithsonian Institution (1893–1906) |
| William Lorimer | Elected United States Senator from Illinois (1909–1912) |
| Henry Hyde | Primary author of the Hyde Amendment |
| Peter Roskam | Served as U.S. House Majority Chief Deputy Whip (2011–2014) |

== List of members representing the district ==
| Member | Party | Years | Cong ress | Electoral history | District location |
|---|---|---|---|---|---|
District created March 4, 1843
| Joseph P. Hoge (Galena) | Democratic | March 4, 1843 – March 3, 1847 | 28th 29th | Elected in 1842. Re-elected in 1844. Retired. | |
| Thomas J. Turner (Freeport) | Democratic | March 4, 1847 – March 3, 1849 | 30th | Elected in 1846. [data missing] | |
| Edward D. Baker (Galena) | Whig | March 4, 1849 – March 3, 1851 | 31st | Elected in 1848. [data missing] | |
| Thompson Campbell (Galena) | Democratic | March 4, 1851 – March 3, 1853 | 32nd | Elected in 1850. [data missing] | |
| Richard Yates (Jacksonville) | Whig | March 4, 1853 – March 3, 1855 | 33rd | Redistricted from the 7th district and re-elected in 1852. [data missing] | |
| Thomas L. Harris (Petersburg) | Democratic | March 4, 1855 – November 24, 1858 | 34th 35th | Re-elected in 1854. Re-elected in 1856. Re-elected in 1858; Died. | |
| Vacant | | November 24, 1858 – January 4, 1859 | 35th | | |
| Charles D. Hodges (Carrollton) | Democratic | January 4, 1859 – March 3, 1859 | 35th | Elected to finish Harris' term in the 35th Congress. Retired. | |
| Vacant | | March 4, 1859 – November 8, 1859 | 36th | | |
| John A. McClernand (Springfield) | Democratic | November 8, 1859 – October 28, 1861 | 36th 37th | Elected to finish Harris' term in the 36th Congress. Re-elected in 1860. Resigned to accept commission as brigadier general of volunteers for service in the Civil War. | |
| Vacant | | October 28, 1861 – December 12, 1861 | 37th | | |
| Anthony L. Knapp (Jerseyville) | Democratic | December 12, 1861 – March 3, 1863 | 37th | Elected to finish McClernand's term. Redistricted to the 10th district. | |
| Jesse O. Norton (Joliet) | Republican | March 4, 1863 – March 3, 1865 | 38th | Elected in 1862. [data missing] | |
| Burton C. Cook (Ottawa) | Republican | March 4, 1865 – August 26, 1871 | 39th 40th 41st 42nd | Re-elected in 1864. Re-elected in 1866. Re-elected in 1868. Re-elected in 1870. Resigned. | |
| Vacant | | August 26, 1871 – December 4, 1871 | 42nd | | |
| Henry Snapp (Joliet) | Republican | December 4, 1871 – March 3, 1873 | 42nd | Elected to finish Cook's term. [data missing] | |
| John B. Hawley (Rock Island) | Republican | March 4, 1873 – March 3, 1875 | 43rd | Redistricted from the 4th district and re-elected in 1872. [data missing] | |
| Thomas J. Henderson (Princeton) | Republican | March 4, 1875 – March 3, 1883 | 44th 45th 46th 47th | Elected in 1874. Re-elected in 1876. Re-elected in 1878. Re-elected in 1880. Redistricted to the 7th district. | |
| Robert R. Hitt (Mount Morris) | Republican | March 4, 1883 – March 3, 1895 | 48th 49th 50th 51st 52nd 53rd | Redistricted from the 5th district and re-elected in 1882. Re-elected in 1884. Re-elected in 1886. Re-elected in 1888. Re-elected in 1890. Re-elected in 1892. Redistricted to the 9th district. | |
| Edward D. Cooke (Chicago) | Republican | March 4, 1895 – June 24, 1897 | 54th 55th | Elected in 1894. Re-elected in 1896. Died. | |
| Vacant | | June 24, 1897 – November 23, 1897 | 55th | | |
| Henry S. Boutell (Chicago) | Republican | November 23, 1897 – March 3, 1903 | 55th 56th 57th | Elected to finish Cooke's term. Re-elected in 1898. Re-elected in 1900. Redistricted to the 9th district. | |
| William Lorimer (Chicago) | Republican | March 4, 1903 – June 17, 1909 | 58th 59th 60th 61st | Elected in 1902. Re-elected in 1904. Re-elected in 1906. Re-elected in 1908. Resigned when elected to US Senate. | |
| Vacant | | June 17, 1909 – November 23, 1909 | 61st | | |
| William Moxley (Chicago) | Republican | November 23, 1909 – March 3, 1911 | 61st | Elected to finish Lorimer's term. [data missing] | |
| Edmund J. Stack (Chicago) | Democratic | March 4, 1911 – March 3, 1913 | 62nd | Elected in 1910. [data missing] | |
| James McAndrews (Chicago) | Democratic | March 4, 1913 – March 3, 1921 | 63rd 64th 65th 66th | Elected in 1912. Re-elected in 1914. Re-elected in 1916. Re-elected in 1918. [data missing] | |
| John J. Gorman (Chicago) | Republican | March 4, 1921 – March 3, 1923 | 67th | Elected in 1920. [data missing] | |
| James R. Buckley (Chicago) | Democratic | March 4, 1923 – March 3, 1925 | 68th | Elected in 1922. [data missing] | |
| John J. Gorman (Chicago) | Republican | March 4, 1925 – March 3, 1927 | 69th | Elected in 1924. [data missing] | |
| James T. Igoe (Chicago) | Democratic | March 4, 1927 – March 3, 1933 | 70th 71st 72nd | Elected in 1926. Re-elected in 1928. Re-elected in 1930. [data missing] | |
| Thomas J. O'Brien (Chicago) | Democratic | March 4, 1933 – January 3, 1939 | 73rd 74th 75th | Elected in 1932. Re-elected in 1934. Re-elected in 1936. [data missing] | |
| A. F. Maciejewski (Cicero) | Democratic | January 3, 1939 – December 8, 1942 | 76th 77th | Elected in 1938. Re-elected in 1940. Resigned. | |
| Vacant | | December 8, 1942 – January 3, 1943 | 77th | | |
| Thomas J. O'Brien (Chicago) | Democratic | January 3, 1943 – April 14, 1964 | 78th 79th 80th 81st 82nd 83rd 84th 85th 86th 87th 88th | Elected in 1942. Re-elected in 1944. Re-elected in 1946. Re-elected in 1948. Re-elected in 1950. Re-elected in 1952. Re-elected in 1954. Re-elected in 1956. Re-elected in 1958. Re-elected in 1960. Re-elected in 1962. Died. | |
| Vacant | | April 14, 1964 – January 3, 1965 | 88th | | |
| Daniel J. Ronan (Chicago) | Democratic | January 3, 1965 – August 13, 1969 | 89th 90th 91st | Elected in 1964. Re-elected in 1966. Re-elected in 1968. Died. | |
| Vacant | | August 13, 1969 – November 3, 1970 | 91st | | |
| George W. Collins (Chicago) | Democratic | November 3, 1970 – December 8, 1972 | 91st 92nd | Elected to finish Ronan's term. Re-elected in 1970. Died. | |
| Vacant | | December 8, 1972 – January 3, 1973 | 92nd | | |
| Harold R. Collier (Riverside) | Republican | January 3, 1973 – January 3, 1975 | 93rd | Redistricted from the 10th district and re-elected in 1972. Retired. | |
| Henry Hyde (Wood Dale) | Republican | January 3, 1975 – January 3, 2007 | 94th 95th 96th 97th 98th 99th 100th 101st 102nd 103rd 104th 105th 106th 107th 108th 109th | Elected in 1974. Re-elected in 1976. Re-elected in 1978. Re-elected in 1980. Re-elected in 1982. Re-elected in 1984. Re-elected in 1986. Re-elected in 1988. Re-elected in 1990. Re-elected in 1992. Re-elected in 1994. Re-elected in 1996. Re-elected in 1998. Re-elected in 2000. Re-elected in 2002. Re-elected in 2004. Retired. | |
| Henry Hyde (Wood Dale) | Republican | January 3, 1975 – January 3, 2007 | 94th 95th 96th 97th 98th 99th 100th 101st 102nd 103rd 104th 105th 106th 107th 108th 109th | Elected in 1974. Re-elected in 1976. Re-elected in 1978. Re-elected in 1980. Re-elected in 1982. Re-elected in 1984. Re-elected in 1986. Re-elected in 1988. Re-elected in 1990. Re-elected in 1992. Re-elected in 1994. Re-elected in 1996. Re-elected in 1998. Re-elected in 2000. Re-elected in 2002. Re-elected in 2004. Retired. | 1983–1993 [data missing] |
| Henry Hyde (Wood Dale) | Republican | January 3, 1975 – January 3, 2007 | 94th 95th 96th 97th 98th 99th 100th 101st 102nd 103rd 104th 105th 106th 107th 108th 109th | Elected in 1974. Re-elected in 1976. Re-elected in 1978. Re-elected in 1980. Re-elected in 1982. Re-elected in 1984. Re-elected in 1986. Re-elected in 1988. Re-elected in 1990. Re-elected in 1992. Re-elected in 1994. Re-elected in 1996. Re-elected in 1998. Re-elected in 2000. Re-elected in 2002. Re-elected in 2004. Retired. | 1993–2003 [data missing] |
| Henry Hyde (Wood Dale) | Republican | January 3, 1975 – January 3, 2007 | 94th 95th 96th 97th 98th 99th 100th 101st 102nd 103rd 104th 105th 106th 107th 108th 109th | Elected in 1974. Re-elected in 1976. Re-elected in 1978. Re-elected in 1980. Re-elected in 1982. Re-elected in 1984. Re-elected in 1986. Re-elected in 1988. Re-elected in 1990. Re-elected in 1992. Re-elected in 1994. Re-elected in 1996. Re-elected in 1998. Re-elected in 2000. Re-elected in 2002. Re-elected in 2004. Retired. | 2003–2013 |
| Peter Roskam (Wheaton) | Republican | January 3, 2007 – January 3, 2019 | 110th 111th 112th 113th 114th 115th | Elected in 2006. Re-elected in 2008. Re-elected in 2010. Re-elected in 2012. Re-elected in 2014. Re-elected in 2016. Lost re-election. | 2003–2013 |
| Peter Roskam (Wheaton) | Republican | January 3, 2007 – January 3, 2019 | 110th 111th 112th 113th 114th 115th | Elected in 2006. Re-elected in 2008. Re-elected in 2010. Re-elected in 2012. Re-elected in 2014. Re-elected in 2016. Lost re-election. | 2013–2023 |
| Sean Casten (Downers Grove) | Democratic | January 3, 2019 – present | 116th 117th 118th 119th | Elected in 2018. Re-elected in 2020. Re-elected in 2022. Re-elected in 2024. Re-elected in 2026. | 2013–2023 |
| Sean Casten (Downers Grove) | Democratic | January 3, 2019 – present | 116th 117th 118th 119th | Elected in 2018. Re-elected in 2020. Re-elected in 2022. Re-elected in 2024. Re-elected in 2026. | 2023–present |

== Recent election results ==
=== 2012 ===
Illinois' 6th congressional district, 2012
| Party | Candidate | Votes | % |
|---|---|---|---|
| Republican | Peter Roskam (incumbent) | 193,138 | 59.2 |
| Democratic | Leslie Coolidge | 132,991 | 40.8 |
| Total votes | | 326,129 | 100.0 |
| Republican hold | | | |

=== 2014 ===
Illinois' 6th congressional district, 2014
| Party | Candidate | Votes | % |
|---|---|---|---|
| Republican | Peter Roskam (incumbent) | 160,287 | 67.1 |
| Democratic | Michael Mason | 78,465 | 32.9 |
| Total votes | | 238,752 | 100.0 |
| Republican hold | | | |

=== 2016 ===
Illinois' 6th congressional district, 2016
| Party | Candidate | Votes | % |
|---|---|---|---|
| Republican | Peter Roskam (incumbent) | 208,555 | 59.2 |
| Democratic | Amanda Howland | 143,591 | 40.8 |
| Total votes | | 352,146 | 100.0 |
| Republican hold | | | |

=== 2018 ===
Illinois' 6th congressional district, 2018
| Party | Candidate | Votes | % |
|---|---|---|---|
| Democratic | Sean Casten | 169,001 | 53.6 |
| Republican | Peter Roskam (incumbent) | 146,445 | 46.4 |
| Total votes | | 315,446 | 100.0 |
| Democratic gain from Republican | | | |

=== 2020 ===
Illinois' 6th congressional district, 2020
| Party | Candidate | Votes | % | ±% |
|---|---|---|---|---|
| Democratic | Sean Casten (incumbent) | 213,777 | 52.82 | −0.75% |
| Republican | Jeanne Ives | 183,891 | 45.43 | −0.99% |
| Libertarian | Bill Redpath | 7,079 | 1.75 | N/A |
| Total votes | | 404,747 | 100.0 | |
| Democratic hold | | | | |

=== 2022 ===
Illinois' 6th congressional district, 2022
| Party | Candidate | Votes | % |
|---|---|---|---|
| Democratic | Sean Casten (incumbent) | 150,496 | 54.36 |
| Republican | Keith Pekau | 126,351 | 45.64 |
| Write-in | | 12 | 0.00 |
| Total votes | | 276,859 | 100.0 |
| Democratic hold | | | |

=== 2024 ===
Illinois' 6th congressional district, 2024
| Party | Candidate | Votes | % | ±% |
|---|---|---|---|---|
| Democratic | Sean Casten (incumbent) | 196,647 | 54.20 | −0.16% |
| Republican | Niki Conforti | 166,116 | 45.78 | +0.14% |
| Write-in | | 86 | 0.02 | N/A |
| Total votes | | 362,849 | 100.0 | |
| Democratic hold | | | | |

== See also ==
- Illinois's congressional districts
- Illinois's 6th congressional district election, 2006
- List of United States congressional districts
