= William Moxley =

American politician

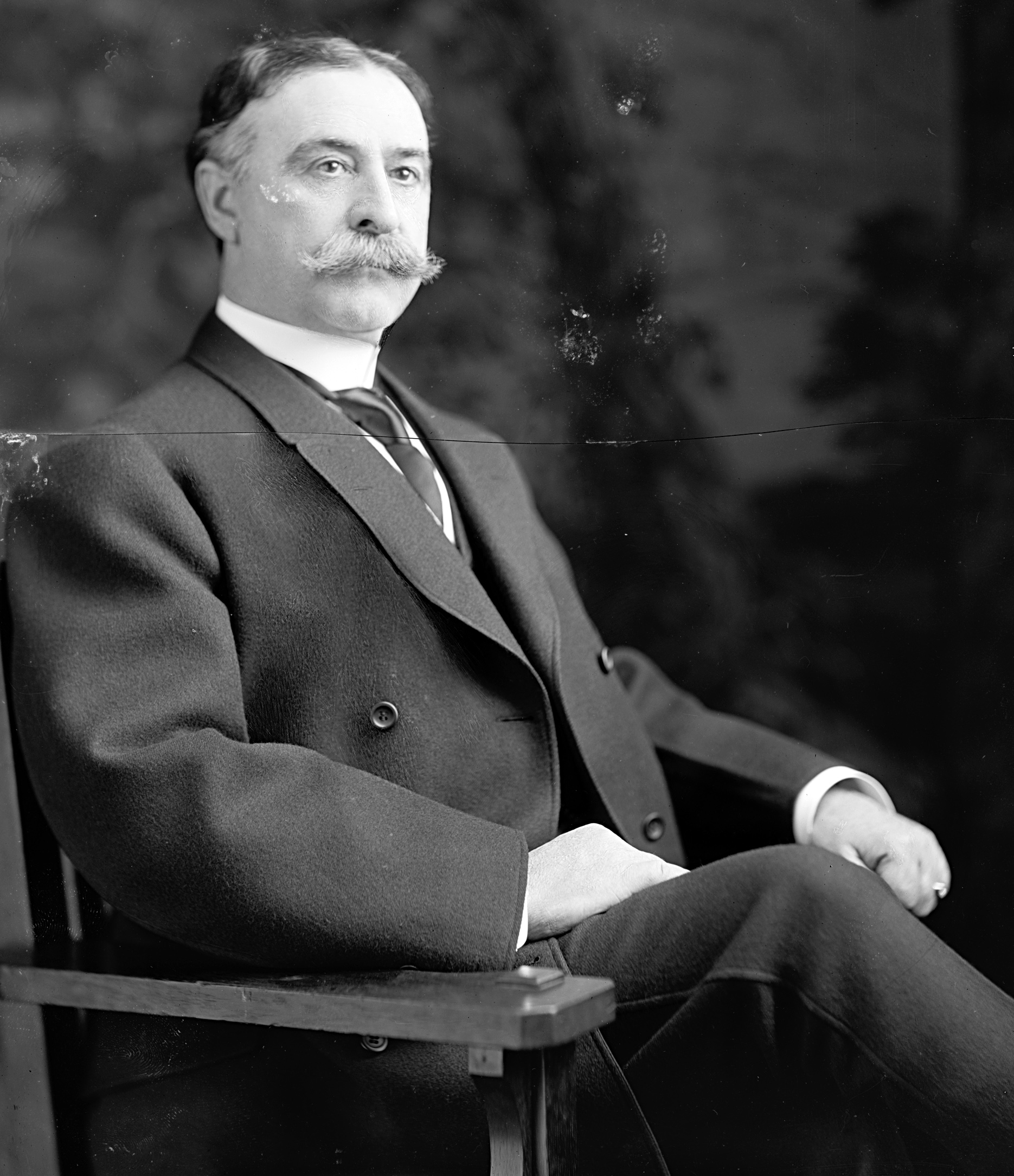
- Moxley c. 1905–25

Member of the U.S. House of Representatives from Illinois's 6th district
- In office November 23, 1909 – March 3, 1911
- Preceded by: William Lorimer
- Succeeded by: Edmund J. Stack

Personal details
- Born: William James Moxley; May 22, 1851 County Cork, Ireland
- Died: August 4, 1938 (aged 87) Delavan, Wisconsin, U.S.
- Party: Republican

William James Moxley (May 22, 1851 – August 4, 1938) of Chicago, Illinois was born in County Cork, Ireland. He was a representative from Illinois's 6th congressional district, 1909–1911.

U.S. House of Representatives
Preceded by William Lorimer	Member of the U.S. House of Representatives from Illinois's 6th congressional district November 23, 1909 – March 3, 1911	Succeeded by Edmund J. Stack
