= Anthony Michalek =

American politician

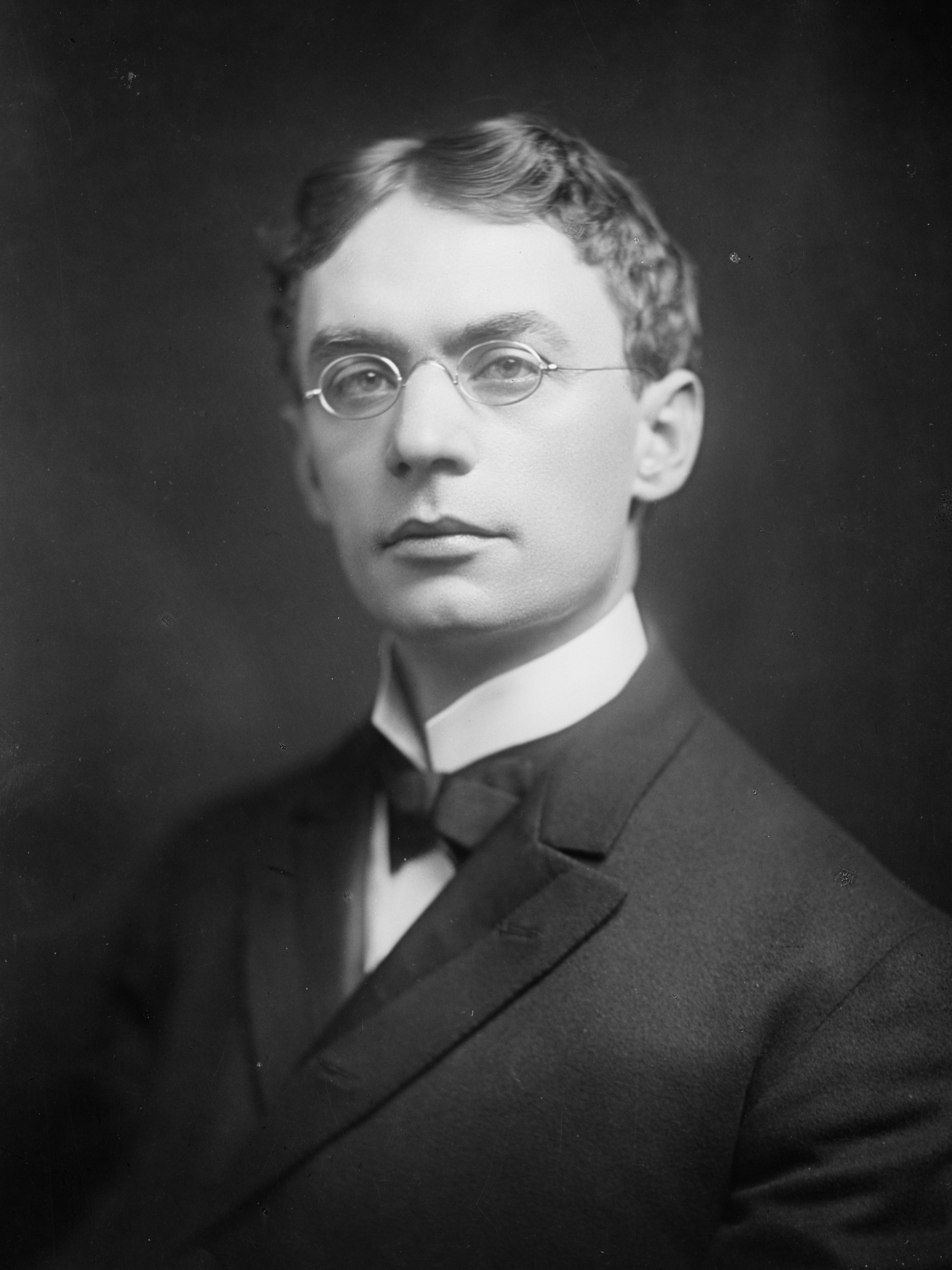
- Michalek c. 1905–1906

Member of the U.S. House of Representatives from Illinois's 5th district
- In office March 4, 1905 – March 3, 1907
- Preceded by: James McAndrews
- Succeeded by: Adolph J. Sabath

Personal details
- Born: January 16, 1878 Radvanov, Kingdom of Bohemia, Austria-Hungary
- Died: December 21, 1916 (aged 38) Chicago, Illinois, U.S.
- Resting place: St. Adalbert Cemetery
- Party: Republican

Anthony Michalek (original surname Michálek; January 16, 1878 – December 21, 1916) was a U.S. representative for Illinois's 5th congressional district.

== Biography ==
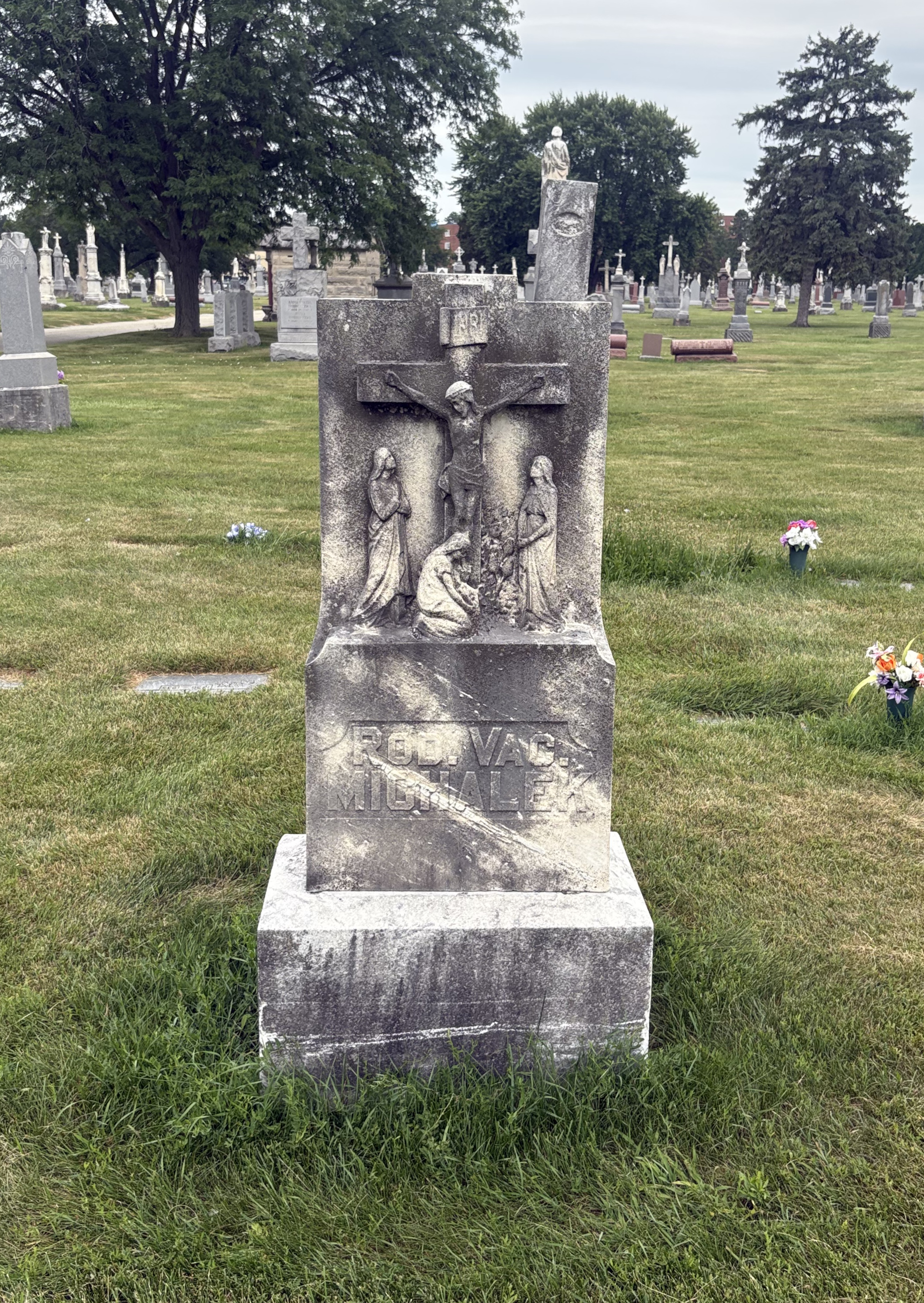
Michalek's grave at St. Adalbert Cemetery

Anthony was born Antonín Michálek in Radvanov and immigrated to the United States with his older siblings and parents, Václav and Terezie [née Zelingrová], who settled in Chicago, Illinois, the same year. His father produced beer for the Siepp Brewing Company until his death in 1883, when his son was five years old. The younger Michalek attended the common schools and later worked professionally as a bookkeeper before entering politics.

Michalek was elected as a Republican to the 59th Congress (March 4, 1905 – March 3, 1907). He was an unsuccessful candidate for reelection in 1906 to the 60th Congress, and for election in 1908 to the 61st Congress. He served as president and manager of a Chicago musical conservatory.

He died in Chicago on December 21, 1916, and was interred in St. Adalbert Cemetery in Niles, Illinois.

U.S. House of Representatives
Preceded by James McAndrews	Member of the U.S. House of Representatives from Illinois's 5th congressional district 1905–1907	Succeeded by Adolph J. Sabath
