= Edmund J. Stack =

American politician

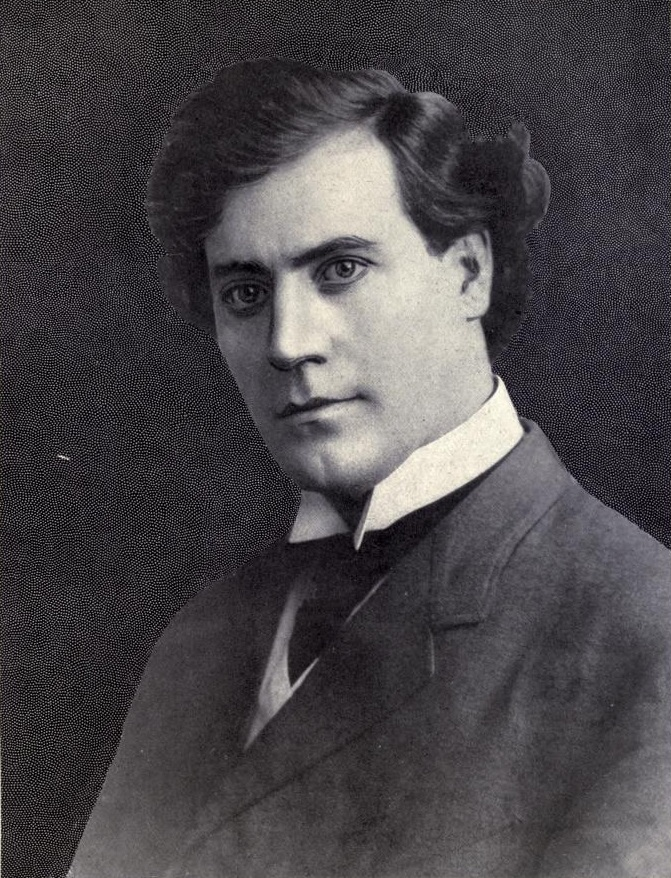
- From 1912's Notable Men of Illinois & Their State

Member of the U.S. House of Representatives from Illinois's 6th district
- In office March 4, 1911 – March 3, 1913
- Preceded by: William Moxley
- Succeeded by: James McAndrews

Personal details
- Born: January 31, 1874 Chicago, Illinois, U.S.
- Died: April 12, 1957 (aged 83) Chicago, Illinois, U.S.
- Party: Democratic

Edmund John Stack (January 31, 1874 – April 12, 1957) was a U.S. representative from Illinois.

Born in Chicago, Illinois, Stack attended the grammar and high schools of Chicago. He was graduated from the law department of Lake Forest (Illinois) University in 1895. He was admitted to the bar the same year and commenced the practice of his profession in Chicago, Illinois. He was appointed assistant corporation counsel of Chicago and, later, chief trial attorney. He was an unsuccessful candidate for election in 1906 to the Sixtieth Congress.

Stack was elected as a Democrat to the Sixty-second Congress (March 4, 1911 - March 3, 1913). He was an unsuccessful candidate for renomination in 1912. He resumed the practice of law. He died in Chicago, Illinois, April 12, 1957. He was interred in Calvary Cemetery, Evanston, Illinois.

U.S. House of Representatives
Preceded by William Moxley	Member of the U.S. House of Representatives from Illinois's 6th congressional district 1911–1913	Succeeded by James McAndrews
