= Edward D. Cooke =

American politician

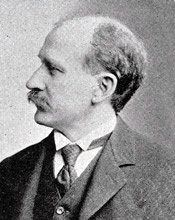

Member of the U.S. House of Representatives from Illinois's 6th district
- In office March 4, 1895 – June 24, 1897
- Preceded by: Robert R. Hitt
- Succeeded by: Henry Sherman Boutell

Member of the Illinois House of Representatives
- In office 1883

Personal details
- Born: October 17, 1849 Cascade, Iowa, U.S.
- Died: June 24, 1897 (aged 47) Washington, D.C., U.S.
- Party: Republican

Edward Dean Cooke (October 17, 1849 – June 24, 1897) was a U.S. representative from Illinois.

Born in Cascade, Iowa, Cooke attended the common schools, the local academy, and the high school at Dubuque. He studied law at Dubuque and in the law department of Columbian University (now George Washington University), Washington, D.C., and was graduated from that institution in 1873. He was admitted to the bar in the same year and commenced practice in Chicago, Illinois. He served as member of the State house of representatives in 1883.

Cooke was elected as a Republican to the Fifty-fourth and Fifty-fifth Congresses and served from March 4, 1895, until his death in Washington, D.C., June 24, 1897. He was interred in Rosehill Cemetery, Chicago, Illinois.

== See also ==
- List of members of the United States Congress who died in office (1790–1899)

U.S. House of Representatives
Preceded by Robert R. Hitt	Member of the U.S. House of Representatives from Illinois's 6th congressional district March 4, 1895 – June 24, 1897	Succeeded by Henry S. Boutell
