= Lynden Evans =

American politician

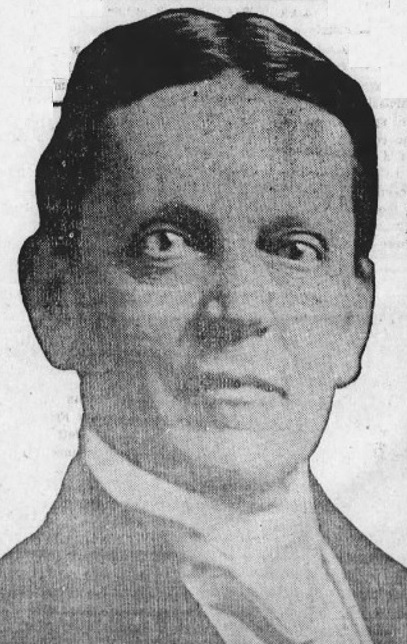
- The Dodge City Globe (Dodge City, Kansas), January 11, 1912

Member of the U.S. House of Representatives from Illinois's 9th district
- In office March 4, 1911 – March 3, 1913
- Preceded by: Henry Sherman Boutell
- Succeeded by: Frederick A. Britten

Personal details
- Born: June 28, 1858 LaSalle, Illinois
- Died: May 6, 1926 (aged 67) Chicago, Illinois
- Party: Democratic

Lynden Evans (June 28, 1858 – May 6, 1926) was a U.S. Representative from Illinois.

Born in LaSalle, Illinois, his siblings included Frederic Dahl Evans. Evans attended the public schools and was graduated from Knox College, Galesburg, Illinois, in 1882. He taught in the schools of La Salle and Evanston, Illinois. He studied law. He was admitted to the bar in 1885 and commenced practice at Chicago, Illinois. Lecturer on corporation law in the John Marshall Law School in 1907 and 1908.

Evans was elected as a Democrat to the Sixty-second Congress (March 4, 1911 – March 3, 1913). He was an unsuccessful candidate for reelection in 1912 to the Sixty-third Congress.

He resumed the practice of law in Chicago, Illinois, until his death there on May 6, 1926. He was interred in Graceland Cemetery.

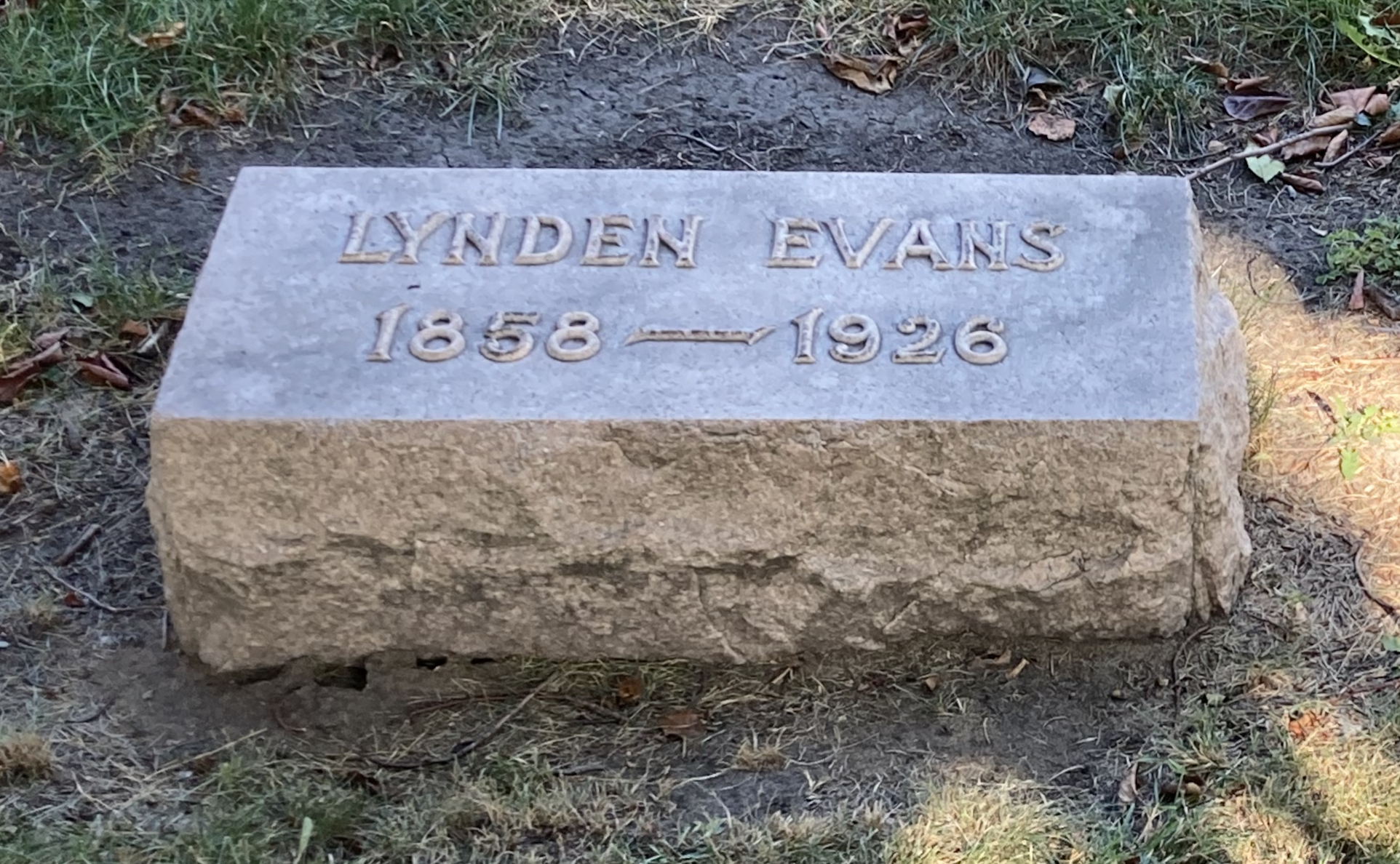
Evans' grave

U.S. House of Representatives
Preceded by Henry S. Boutell	Member of the U.S. House of Representatives from Illinois's 9th congressional district 1911 – 1913	Succeeded by Frederick A. Britten
