= Adolph J. Sabath =

American politician (1866–1952)

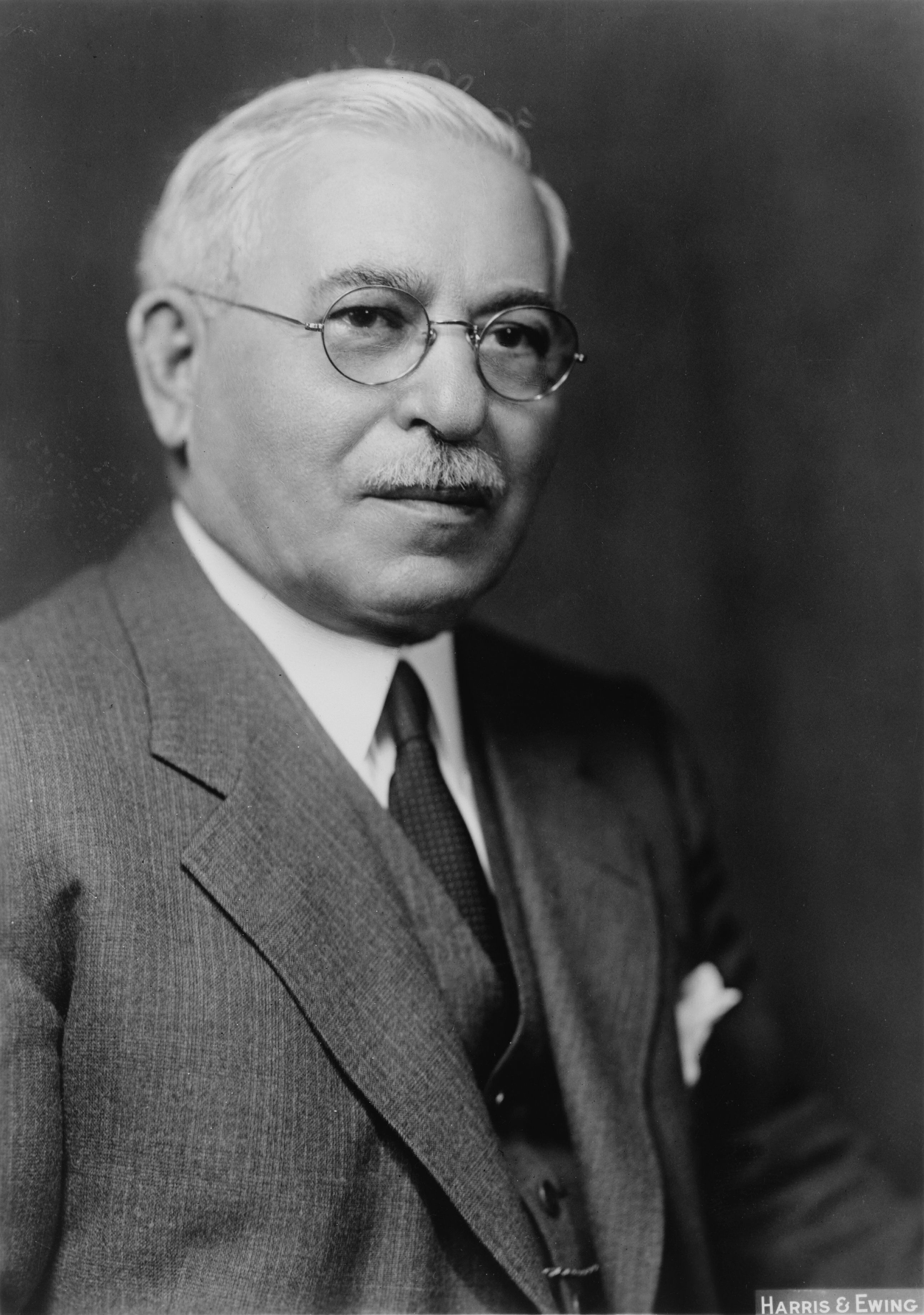

35th Dean of the United States House of Representatives
- In office April 1, 1934 – November 6, 1952
- Preceded by: Edward W. Pou
- Succeeded by: Robert L. Doughton

Chair of the House Rules Committee
- In office January 3, 1949 – November 6, 1952
- Speaker: Sam Rayburn
- Preceded by: Leo E. Allen
- Succeeded by: Leo E. Allen
- In office January 3, 1939 – January 3, 1947
- Speaker: Joseph W. Byrns Sr. William B. Bankhead; Sam Rayburn
- Preceded by: John J. O'Connor
- Succeeded by: Leo E. Allen

Member of the U.S. House of Representatives from Illinois
- In office March 4, 1907 – November 6, 1952
- Preceded by: Anthony Michalek
- Succeeded by: James Bowler
- Constituency: 5th district (1907–49); 7th district (1949–52)

Personal details
- Born: Adolph Joachim Sabath; April 4, 1866 Záboří, Kingdom of Bohemia, Austrian Empire
- Died: November 6, 1952 (aged 86) Bethesda, Maryland, U.S.
- Resting place: Forest Home Cemetery
- Party: Democratic
- Education: Chicago College of Law
- Profession: Business (real estate), lawyer

Adolph Joachim Sabath (April 4, 1866 – November 6, 1952) was an American politician who served as a member of the U.S. House of Representatives from Chicago, Illinois, from 1907 until his death in 1952. From 1934 onward, he served as the dean of the United States House of Representatives. At the time of his death, he had the longest uninterrupted service in the history of the House, a distinction he retained until John Dingell surpassed him on August 9, 2013.

== Early life ==
Born in Záboří, Austrian Empire (now the Czech Republic) into a Jewish family, he immigrated to America at age 15, became active in real estate, and received his LL.B. degree in 1891 from the Chicago College of Law (now Chicago-Kent College of Law). He served in local offices including justice of the peace (1895–1897) and police magistrate (1897–1906) until election to Congress from the Jewish and Czech West Side in 1907. He was active in state and national Democratic party affairs, attending many conventions. In 1911, he received much positive attention in the Czech community in Chicago for his fundraising efforts in the search for Elsie Paroubek, and paid for the child's funeral when her body was discovered.

== Career ==
Elected in 1906, Sabath was a leading opponent of immigration restrictions and prohibition. In the 1920s he denounced the prohibition factions, the Anti-Saloon League "and their allied forces and co-workers, the Ku Klux Klan fanatics." Every year from 1925 to 1933, he consistently submitted bills in the House of Representatives, to amend the Eighteenth Amendment and the Volstead Act to allow commerce in beer and wine. In 1929, he came to the defense of his large immigrant constituency by countering claims that they were responsible for the surge in criminal activity during the 1920s. "The bootlegging and gang killings...are not the by-product but the direct product of the Volstead Act, and the supporters of this crime breeding legislation must claim the new cult of American criminals entirely as their own."

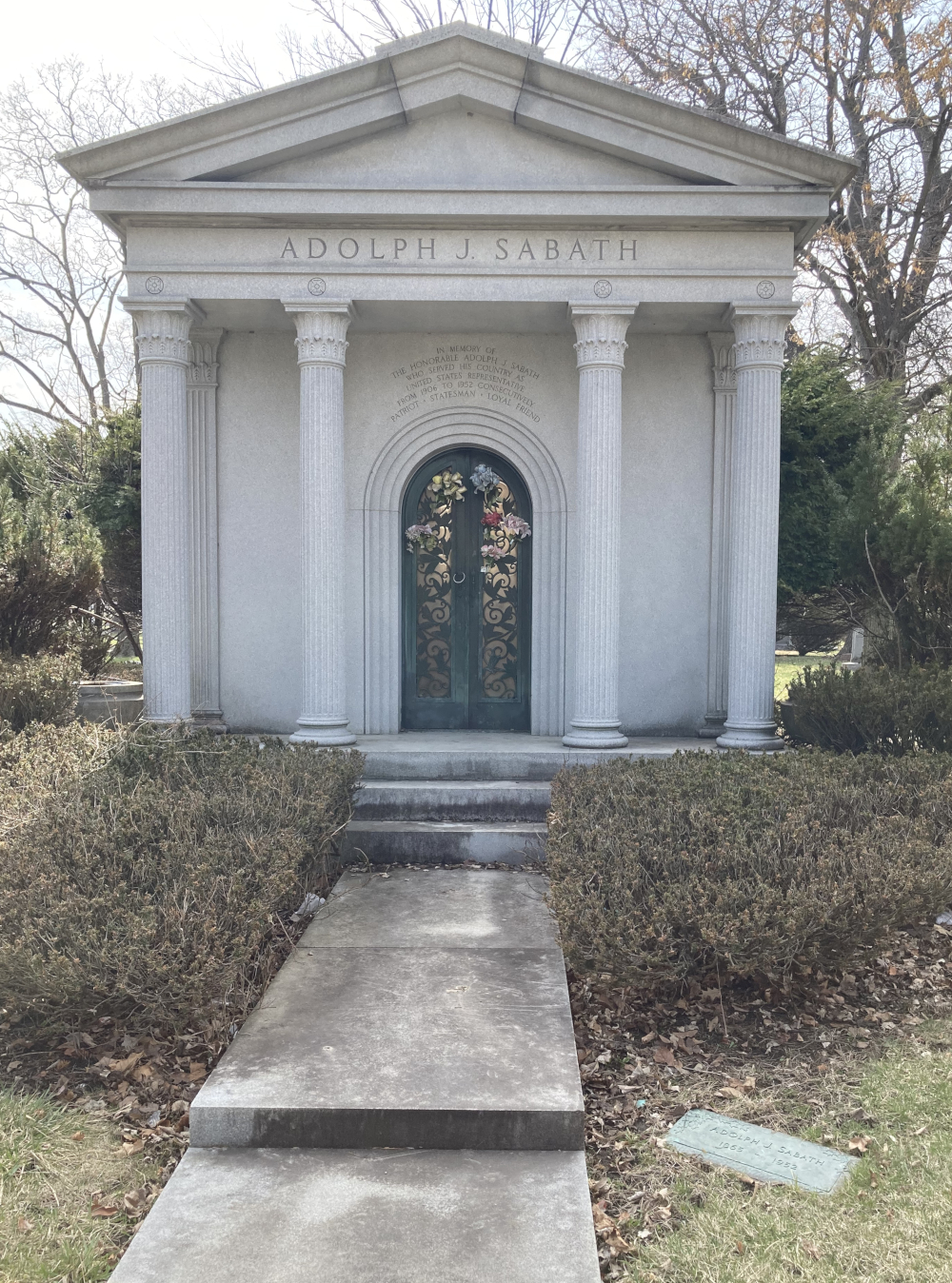
Sabath mausoleum at Forest Home Cemetery

As a leading Democrat he chaired the powerful House Rules Committee after 1937. He was an ineffective chairman, with a small weak staff, who proved unable to lead his committee, was frequently at odds with the House leadership, and was inclined to write the President little letters "informing" on House Speakers William B. Bankhead and Sam Rayburn.

Beginning on April 1, 1934, he was the Dean (longest-serving member) of the House and he served as Dean for 18 years, 7 months, and 5 days: the longest time any person had served as Dean until John Dingell passed him on August 8, 2013.

Sabath was an avid New Dealer and an interventionist who strongly supported war against Nazi Germany. It was Sabath who nominated a teenage (later Admiral) Hyman G. Rickover to the United States Naval Academy. Sabath was also a Zionist who supported the recognition of Israel and requested the lifting of the American embargo imposed on both sides during the 1948 Palestine war.

He died of pancreatic cancer on November 6, 1952, and was buried at Forest Home Cemetery in Forest Park, Illinois, near Chicago.

== See also ==
- List of Jewish members of the United States Congress
- List of members of the United States Congress who died in office (1950–1999)

== Bibliography ==
- James A. Robinson; The House Rules Committee. 1963.

U.S. House of Representatives
Preceded by Anthony Michalek	Member of the U.S. House of Representatives from Illinois's 5th congressional district March 4, 1907 – January 3, 1949	Succeeded by Martin Gorski
Preceded by Thomas Leonard Owens	Member of the U.S. House of Representatives from Illinois's 7th congressional district January 3, 1949 – November 6, 1952	Succeeded by James Bernard Bowler
