= Hitt, Missouri =

Unincorporated community in Missouri, U.S.

Coordinates: 40°33′49″N 92°15′21″W

Hitt is an unincorporated community in northwest Scotland County, in the U.S. state of Missouri.

The community is on Missouri Route B eight miles (13 km) northwest of Memphis. The Missouri-Iowa border is 2.3 miles (3.7 km) north of the community.

== History ==
A variant name was "Billupsville". A post office called Billiopsville was established in 1859, the name was changed to Hitt in 1860, and the post office closed in 1914. The present name honors Robert R. Hitt, an Illinois legislator.
