= Frederick A. Britten =

American politician (1871–1946)

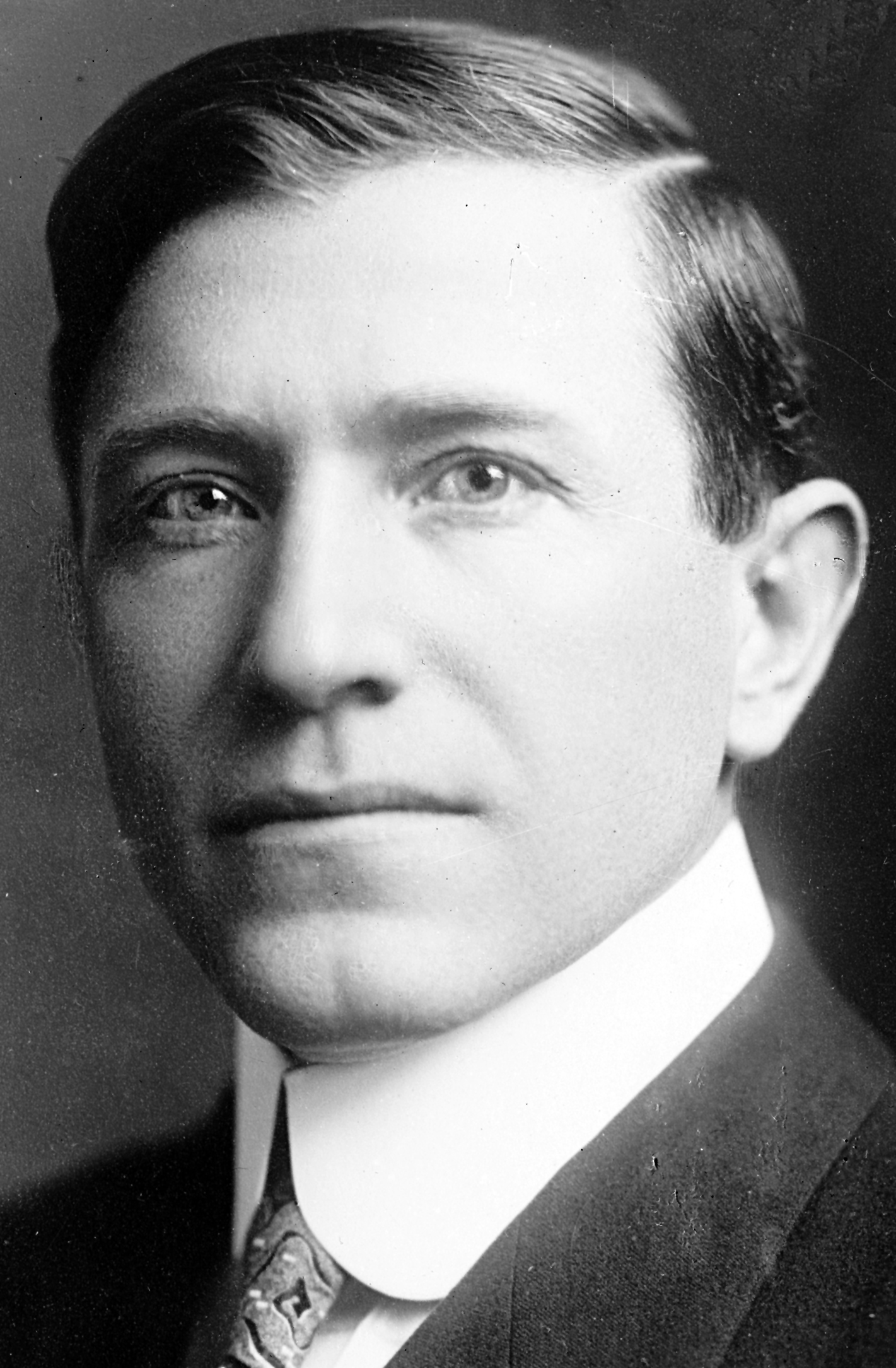
- Britten (c. 1910–1915)

Member of the U.S. House of Representatives from Illinois's 9th district
- In office March 4, 1913 – January 3, 1935
- Preceded by: Lynden Evans
- Succeeded by: James McAndrews

Member of the Chicago City Council from the 23rd ward
- In office 1908–1912
- Preceded by: Mathias J. Jacobs
- Succeeded by: John Kjellander

Personal details
- Born: Frederick Albert Britten; November 18, 1871 Chicago, Illinois, U.S.
- Died: May 4, 1946 (aged 74) Bethesda, Maryland, U.S.
- Party: Republican
- Spouse: Alma Hand (m. 1907)
- Education: Heald's Business College

Frederick Albert Britten (November 18, 1871 – May 4, 1946) was a U.S. representative from Illinois.

== Early life ==
Frederick Albert Britten was born on November 18, 1871, in Chicago, Illinois. Britten attended Heald's Business College, San Francisco, California.

Britten competed in an amateur boxing tournament at the World's Columbian Exposition in 1893. He won the Pacific Coast Championship in 1892, the Central Championship at Chicago in 1893 and the Eastern Championship at Chicago in 1894.

== Career ==
Britten was a construction worker and a business executive before his political career began. He served as member of the Chicago City Council from 1908 to 1912, representing the 23rd ward. He served as member and chairman of the city civil service committee in 1909. Then he served as member of the executive committee of the American group of the Interparliamentary Union from 1923 to 1934. He also served as a delegate to the Republican National Convention in 1936.

In the early 1920s, Britten issued resolution condemning France for the "Black Horror on the Rhine", and which called the Senegalese "semi-civilized, useless and oft-times brutal defamers of women".

Britten was elected as a Republican to the Sixty-third and to the ten succeeding Congresses (1913–1935). On April 5, 1917, he was one of the 50 representatives who voted against declaring war on Germany. He served as chairman of the Committee on Naval Affairs from 1928 to 1931 (Seventieth and Seventy-first Congress). Britten worked to repeal the Eighteenth Amendment. He was an unsuccessful candidate for reelection to the Seventy-fourth Congress in 1934.

In 1938, he worked on an importing and exporting business in Chicago.

== Personal life ==
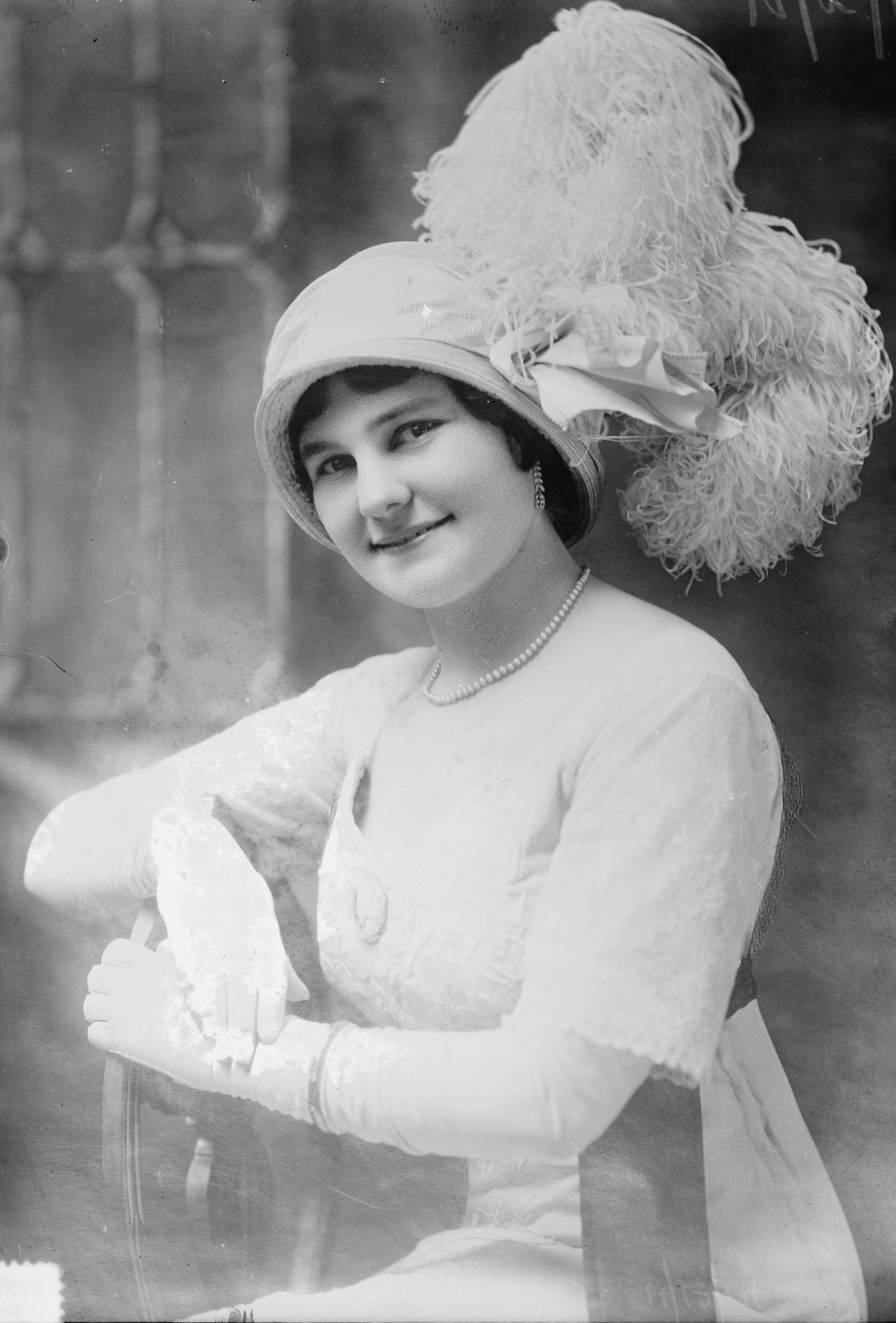
His wife, Alma Hand, c. 1910–1915

Britten married Alma Hand of Weiser, Idaho, on March 4, 1907.

While serving in congress, Britten and his family took up residence at the Emma S. Fitzhugh House at 2253 R Street Northwest, Washington, D.C., and continued residing there even after retiring from politics in 1935. Britten then bought the house from Emma S. Fitzhugh on June 19, 1941 and eventually sold the house to Joaquín M. Elizalde, the first ambassador of the Philippines to the United States on October 14, 1946. The house then became the official residence of Philippine ambassadors to the United States.

== Death ==
Britten died on May 4, 1946, at Walter Reed Hospital in Bethesda, Maryland. He was interred in Abbey Mausoleum in Arlington County, Virginia. He was later reinterred in an unknown location.

U.S. House of Representatives
Preceded by Lynden Evans	Member of the U.S. House of Representatives from Illinois's 9th congressional district 1913 – 1935	Succeeded by James McAndrews
