= Robert R. Hitt =

American politician (1834–1906)

Robert Roberts Hitt
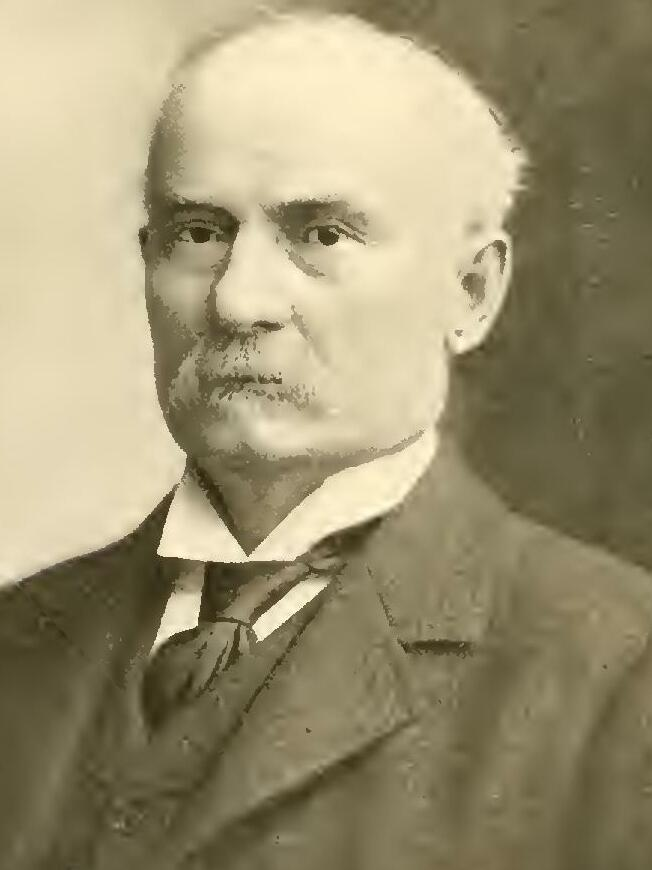

Member of the U.S. House of Representatives from Illinois
- In office December 4, 1882 – September 20, 1906
- Preceded by: Robert M. A. Hawk
- Succeeded by: Frank O. Lowden
- Constituency: 5th district (1882–1883); 6th district (1883–1895); 9th district (1895–1903); 13th district (1903–1906)

13th United States Assistant Secretary of State
- In office May 4, 1881 – December 19, 1881
- President: James A. Garfield; Chester A. Arthur
- Preceded by: John Hay
- Succeeded by: Bancroft Davis

Personal details
- Born: January 16, 1834 Urbana, Ohio, U.S.
- Died: September 20, 1906 (aged 72) Narragansett Pier, Rhode Island, U.S.
- Party: Republican
- Spouse: Sally Reynolds (m. 1874)
- Children: R. S. Reynolds Hitt
- Profession: Secretary, politician

Robert Roberts Hitt (January 16, 1834 – September 20, 1906) was an American diplomat and Republican politician from Illinois. He served briefly as assistant secretary of state in the short-lived administration of James A. Garfield but resigned alongside Secretary of State James G. Blaine after Garfield's assassination in 1881. He returned to Washington to represent Northwestern Illinois in the United States House of Representatives from 1882 to his death. After 1885, he was the senior Republican on the House Committee on Foreign Affairs, which he chaired from 1889 to 1891 and 1895 until his death in 1906.

== Early life ==
He was born in Urbana, Ohio, to Reverend Thomas Smith Hitt and Emily John Hitt. He and his parents moved to Mount Morris, Illinois in 1837. He was educated at Rock River Seminary and De Pauw University.

He became a very close friend of future President of the United States Abraham Lincoln. As an expert shorthand writer, Hitt served as a note-taker for Lincoln during the famous Lincoln–Douglas debates of 1858.

In 1872, Hitt was a personal secretary for Indiana Senator Oliver P. Morton.

== Diplomatic career ==
In December 1874, President Ulysses S. Grant appointed Hitt as First Secretary of the American Legation in Paris. He served from 1874 to 1881 and was Chargé d'Affaires during part of his term.

=== Assistant U.S. Secretary of State (1881) ===
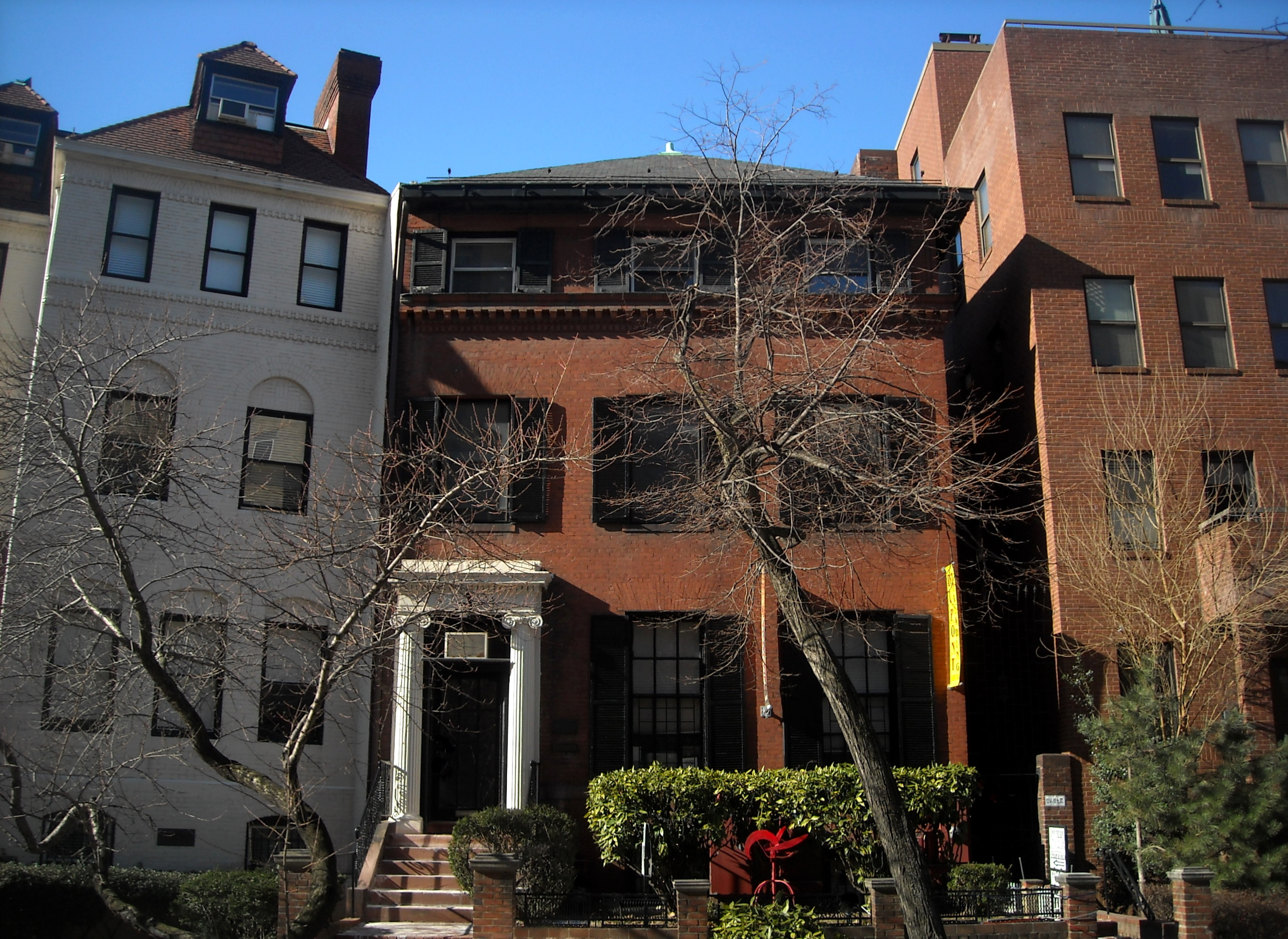
Hitt's former home in Washington, D.C.

He was United States Assistant Secretary of State under James G. Blaine during President James A. Garfield and President Chester A. Arthur's Administrations in 1881.

== U.S. Representative (1882–1906) ==
Hitt was elected to represent Illinois' 5th district in the United States House of Representatives in 1882. Hitt became Chairman of the Committee on Foreign Affairs at the beginning of the Fifty-first Congress and from the Fifty-fourth to Fifty-ninth Congresses.

When the Chinese Exclusion Act of 1882 came up for renewal in 1892, he argued against the alien documentation provisions of the bill: "Never before in a free country was there such a system of tagging a man, like a dog to be caught by the police and examined, and if his tag or collar is not all right, taken to the pound or drowned and shot. Never before was it applied by a free people to a human being, with the exception (which we can never refer to with pride) of the sad days of slavery. …"

He was appointed in July 1898, by President William McKinley, as a member of the commission created by the Newlands Resolution to establish government in the Territory of Hawaii.

Hitt received some support for the Vice-Presidential nomination at the 1904 Republican National Convention, including from President Theodore Roosevelt, but lost the nomination to Charles Fairbanks.

During the last years of his life, he was Regent of the Smithsonian Institution.

== Death and legacy ==
He died on September 20, 1906. He is buried in Oakwood Cemetery in Mount Morris, Illinois, along with his parents.

Hitt is the namesake of the community of Hitt, Missouri.

== See also ==
- List of members of the United States Congress who died in office (1900–1949)

Political offices
Preceded by John Hay	United States Assistant Secretary of State; May 4, 1881 – December 19, 1881	Succeeded by J.C. Bancroft Davis
U.S. House of Representatives
Preceded by Robert M. A. Hawk	Member of the U.S. House of Representatives from Illinois's 5th congressional district December 4, 1882 – March 3, 1883	Succeeded by Reuben Ellwood
Preceded by Thomas J. Henderson	Member of the U.S. House of Representatives from Illinois's 6th congressional district March 4, 1883 – March 3, 1895	Succeeded by Edward D. Cooke
Preceded by Hamilton K. Wheeler	Member of the U.S. House of Representatives from Illinois's 9th congressional district March 4, 1895 – March 3, 1903	Succeeded by Henry Sherman Boutell
Preceded by Vespasian Warner	Member of the U.S. House of Representatives from Illinois's 13th congressional district March 4, 1903 – September 20, 1906	Succeeded by Frank Orren Lowden
