= John J. Feely =

American politician

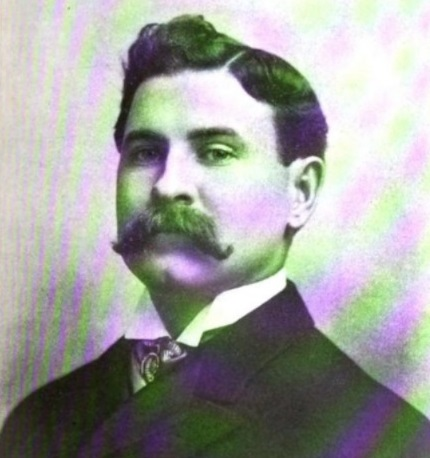

Member of the U.S. House of Representatives from Illinois's 2nd district
- In office March 4, 1901 – March 3, 1903
- Preceded by: William Lorimer
- Succeeded by: James Robert Mann

Personal details
- Born: August 1, 1875 Wilmington, Illinois
- Died: February 15, 1905 (aged 29) Chicago, Illinois
- Party: Democratic

John Joseph Feely (August 1, 1875 – February 15, 1905) was a U.S. Representative from Illinois.

Born on a farm near Wilmington, Illinois, Feely attended the public schools. He was graduated from Niagara University in 1895 and from the law department of Yale University in 1897. He was admitted to the bar in Connecticut in 1897. He moved to Chicago, Illinois in 1898 and engaged in the practice of law.

Feely was elected as a Democrat to the Fifty-seventh Congress (March 4, 1901 – March 3, 1903). He was not a candidate for renomination in 1902. He practiced his profession until his death in Chicago at age 29, unmarried, from gastritis, and was interred in Mount Olivet Cemetery in Joliet, Illinois. He was a Catholic.

Fermanagh and Omagh District Council's John Feely, councillor from Fermanagh, Northern Ireland, is a distant relative.

U.S. House of Representatives
Preceded by William Lorimer	Member of the U.S. House of Representatives from Illinois's 2nd congressional district 1901–1903	Succeeded by James R. Mann
