= James R. Buckley =

American politician

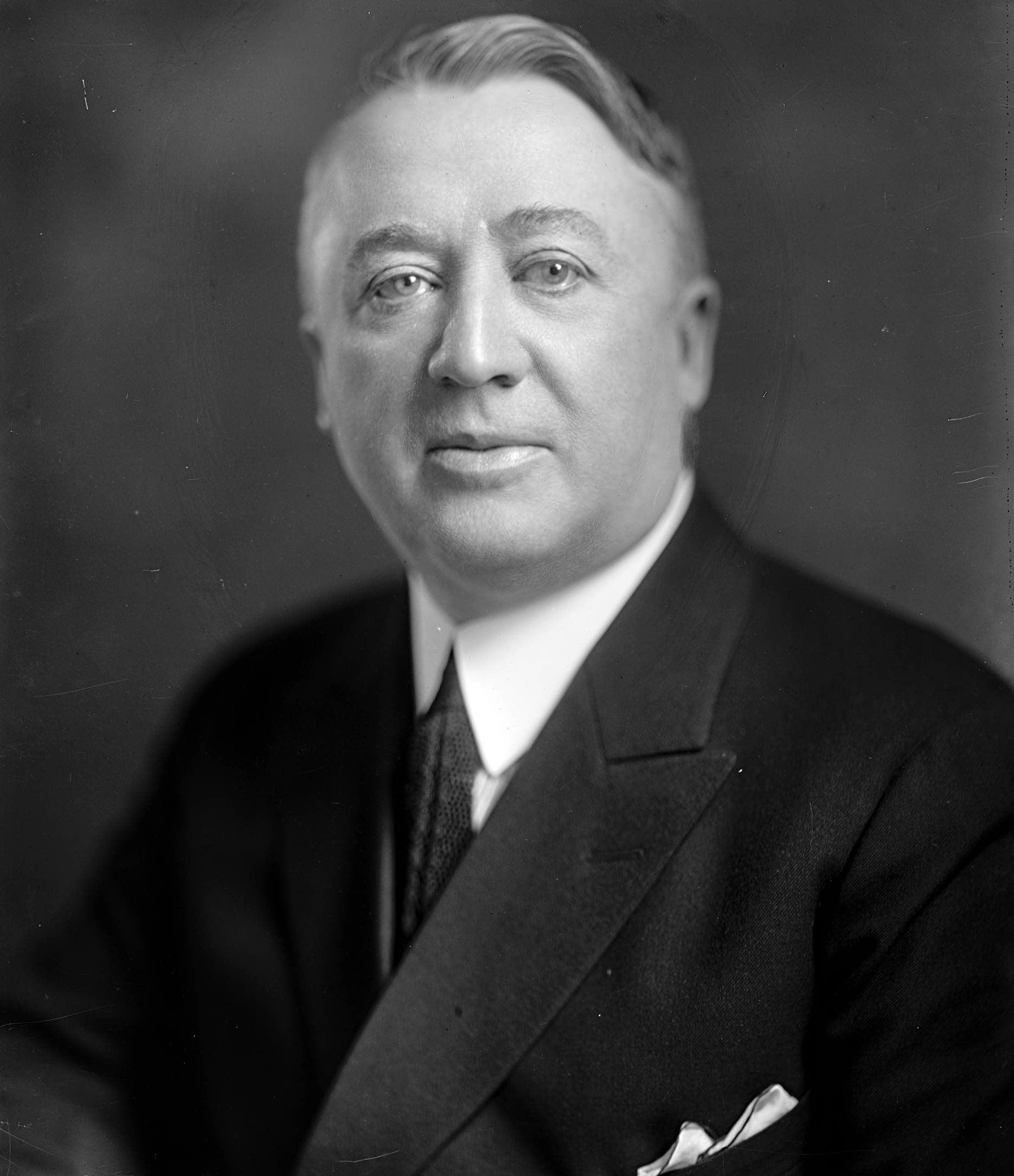

Member of the U.S. House of Representatives from Illinois's 6th district
- In office March 4, 1923 – March 3, 1925
- Preceded by: John J. Gorman
- Succeeded by: John J. Gorman

Personal details
- Born: November 18, 1870 Chicago, Illinois
- Died: June 22, 1945 (aged 74) Chicago, Illinois
- Resting place: Calvary Cemetery
- Party: Democratic
- Spouse: Mary Tahan

James Richard Buckley (November 18, 1870 – June 22, 1945) was a Chicago alderman and U.S. representative from Illinois.

== Biography ==
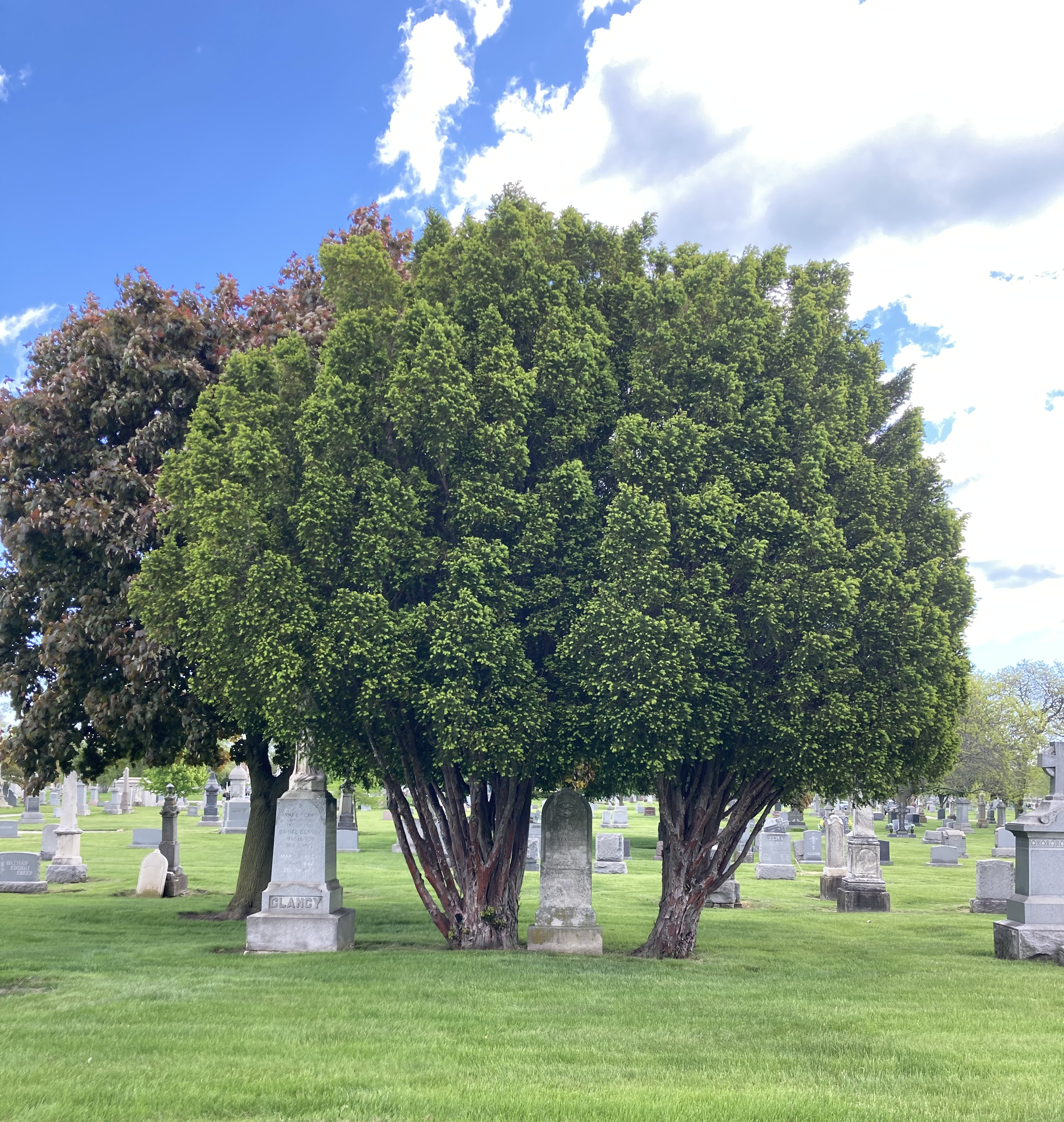
Buckley's grave (center) at Calvary Cemetery

Born in Chicago, Buckley attended the public and parochial schools and Christian Brothers' Commercial Academy.

He engaged in mercantile pursuits and served as a permit clerk of the department of public works from 1893-1897. In 1897, he was appointed deputy city gas inspector, a post he served in until elected to the Chicago City Council in 1910. He served as alderman of Chicago's 13th Ward until 1912.

Buckley ran for the office of clerk of the supreme court of Cook County, Illinois, in 1908 but lost. He served as delegate to the Democratic National Conventions in 1908, 1912, and 1916.

Following his term as alderman, Buckley served as the Chief deputy criminal court clerk from 1912 until 1918 and then as the Manager of the State personal property tax collection department until 1923, when he ran for Congress.

Buckley was elected as a Democrat to the Sixty-eighth Congress (March 4, 1923 – March 3, 1925), representing Illinois 6th District. He ran an unsuccessful reelection campaign in 1924. Following his defeat, he served as vice president of the Universal Granite Quarries. He was serving as chief drain inspector at the time of his death in Chicago on June 22, 1945.

He was interred in Calvary Cemetery, Evanston, Illinois.

U.S. House of Representatives
Preceded by John J. Gorman	Member of the U.S. House of Representatives from Illinois's 6th congressional district 1923–1925	Succeeded by John J. Gorman
