= Záboří (Strakonice District) =

- Municipality
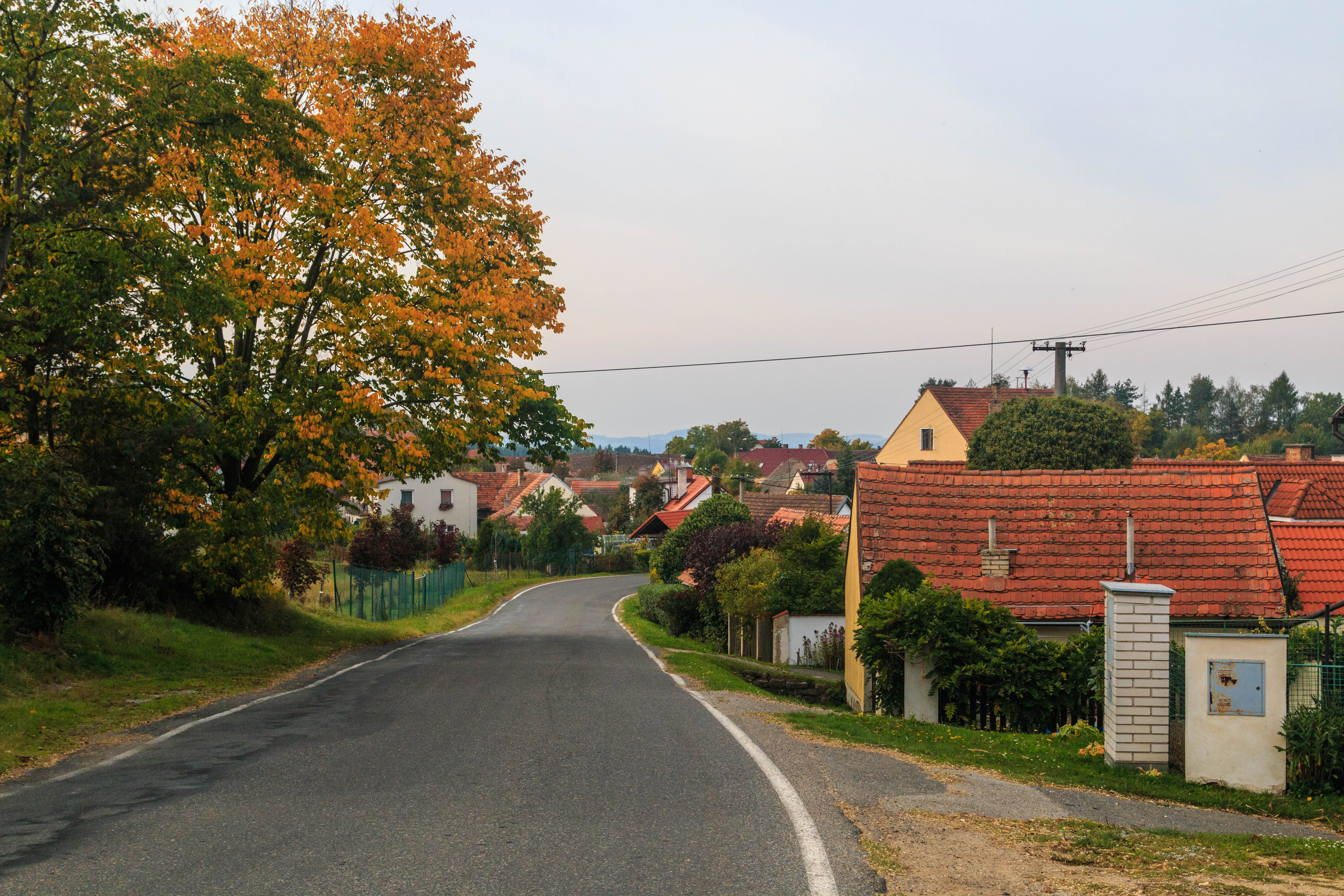
- Main road

- Location in the Czech Republic
- Coordinates: 49°22′44″N 13°49′37″E
- Country: Czech Republic
- Region: South Bohemian
- District: Strakonice
- First mentioned: 1298

Area
  - Total: 6.85 km^{2} (2.64 sq mi)
- Elevation: 555 m (1,821 ft)

Population (2026-01-01)
  - Total: 335
  - Density: 48.9/km^{2} (127/sq mi)
- Time zone: UTC+1 (CET)
  - Summer (DST): UTC+2 (CEST)
- Postal code: 387 34
- Website: www.zabori.cz

Záboří is a municipality and village in Strakonice District in the South Bohemian Region of the Czech Republic. It has about 300 inhabitants.

Záboří lies approximately 15 kilometres (9 mi) north-west of Strakonice, 66 km (41 mi) north-west of České Budějovice, and 90 km (56 mi) south-west of Prague.

== Demographics ==
Historical population
Year	Pop.	±%
1869	452	—
1880	479	+6.0%
1890	407	−15.0%
1900	417	+2.5%
1910	430	+3.1%
1921	423	−1.6%
1930	404	−4.5%
1950	348	−13.9%
1961	301	−13.5%
1970	254	−15.6%
1980	306	+20.5%
1991	327	+6.9%
2001	340	+4.0%
2011	310	−8.8%
2021	322	+3.9%
Source: Censuses

== Notable people ==
- Adolph J. Sabath (1866–1952), American politician
