= James T. Igoe =

American politician

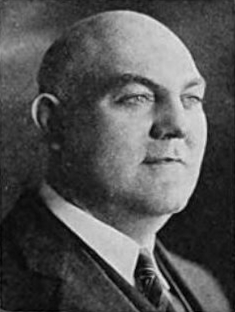
- From 1927's Blue Book of the State of Illinois

Member of the U.S. House of Representatives from Illinois's 6th district
- In office March 4, 1927 – March 3, 1933
- Preceded by: John J. Gorman
- Succeeded by: Thomas J. O'Brien

Personal details
- Born: October 23, 1883 Chicago, Illinois, US
- Died: December 2, 1971 (aged 88) Evanston, Illinois, US
- Party: Democratic

James Thomas Igoe (October 23, 1883 – December 2, 1971) was a United States representative from Illinois.

He was born on October 21, 1883, in Chicago, Illinois. He attended the St. Ignatius College (now known as Loyola University Chicago). He became engaged in the printing and publishing business in 1907.

Igoe served as city clerk of Chicago from 1917–1923. He was a delegate to the Democratic National Conventions in 1920, 1928, and 1936 and was elected as a Democrat to the Seventieth and to the two succeeding Congresses (March 4, 1927 – March 3, 1933). He was an unsuccessful candidate for renomination in 1932 to the Seventy-third Congress.

He became president of a building corporation in 1931. He was chairman of the Illinois delegation to Golden Gate International Exposition in San Francisco in 1939 and 1940. Later, he entered the real estate business in 1942. He was director and later chairman of executive committee of Mercantile National Bank of Chicago from 1955 to 1961. He died in Evanston, Illinois on December 2, 1971, and was buried at the All Saints Cemetery, Des Plaines, Illinois.

U.S. House of Representatives
Preceded by John J. Gorman	Member of the U.S. House of Representatives from Illinois's 6th congressional district 1927–1933	Succeeded by Thomas J. O'Brien
