= Kly (Mělník District) =

- Municipality
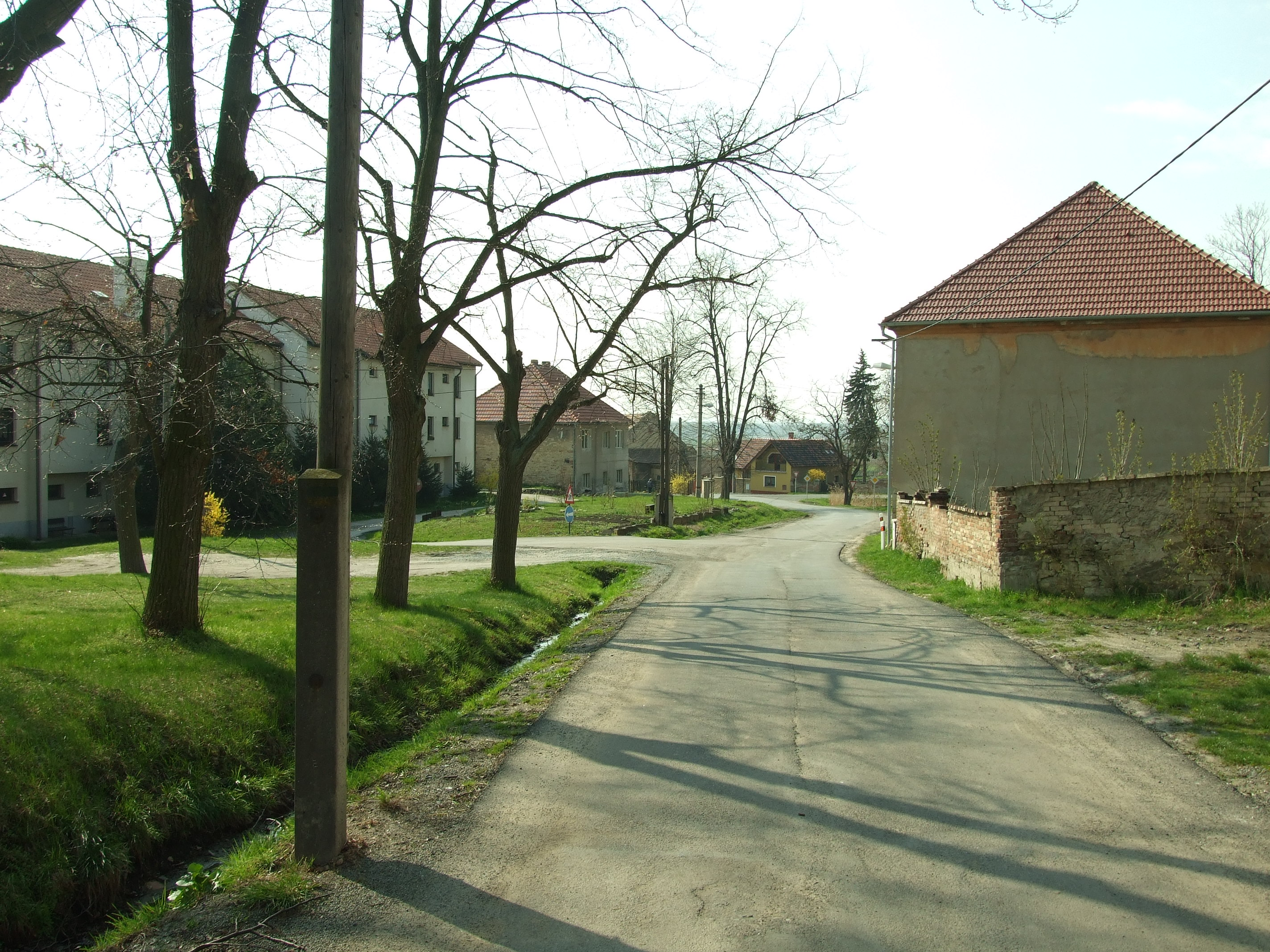
- Záboří, a part of Kly

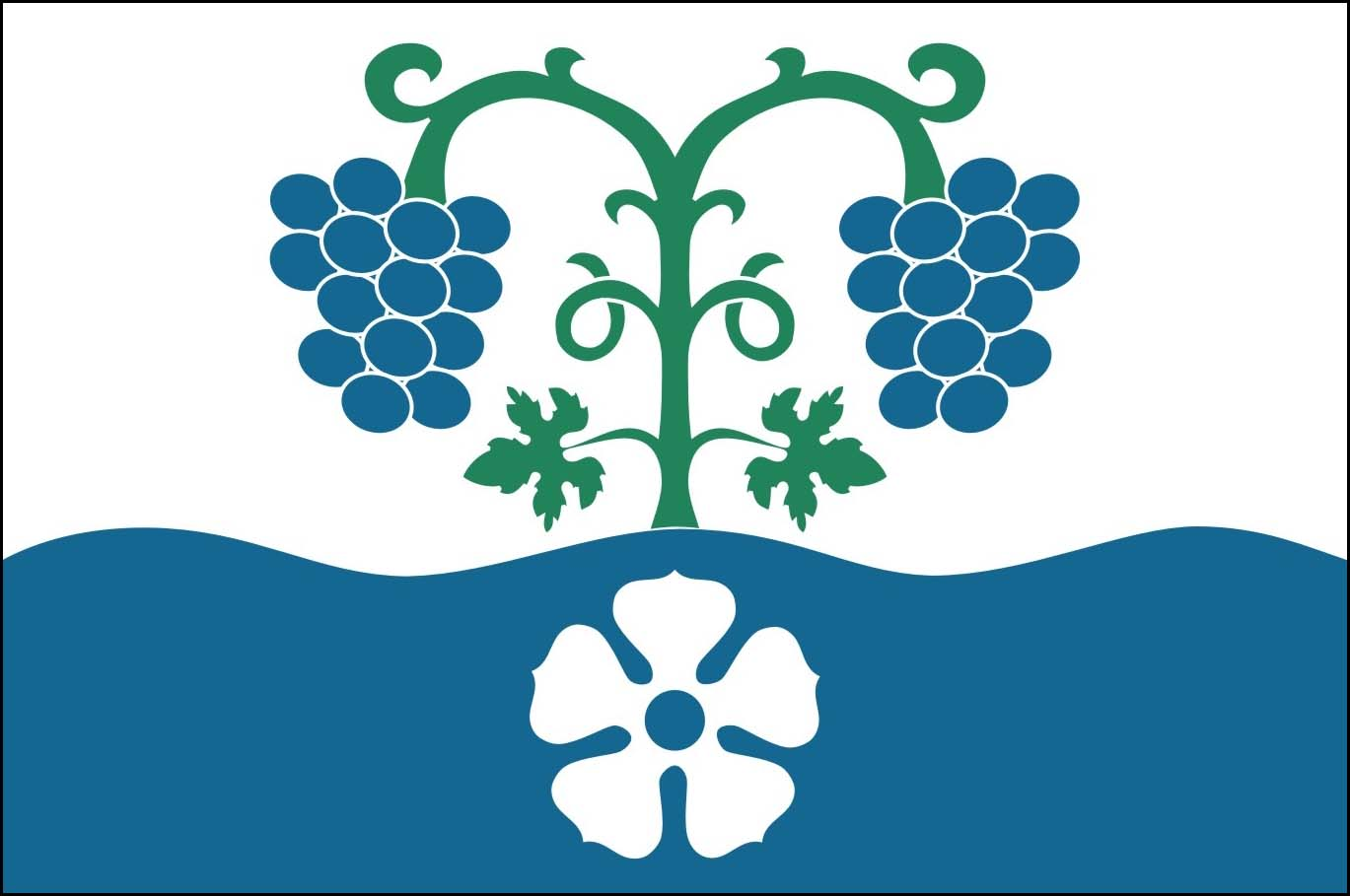
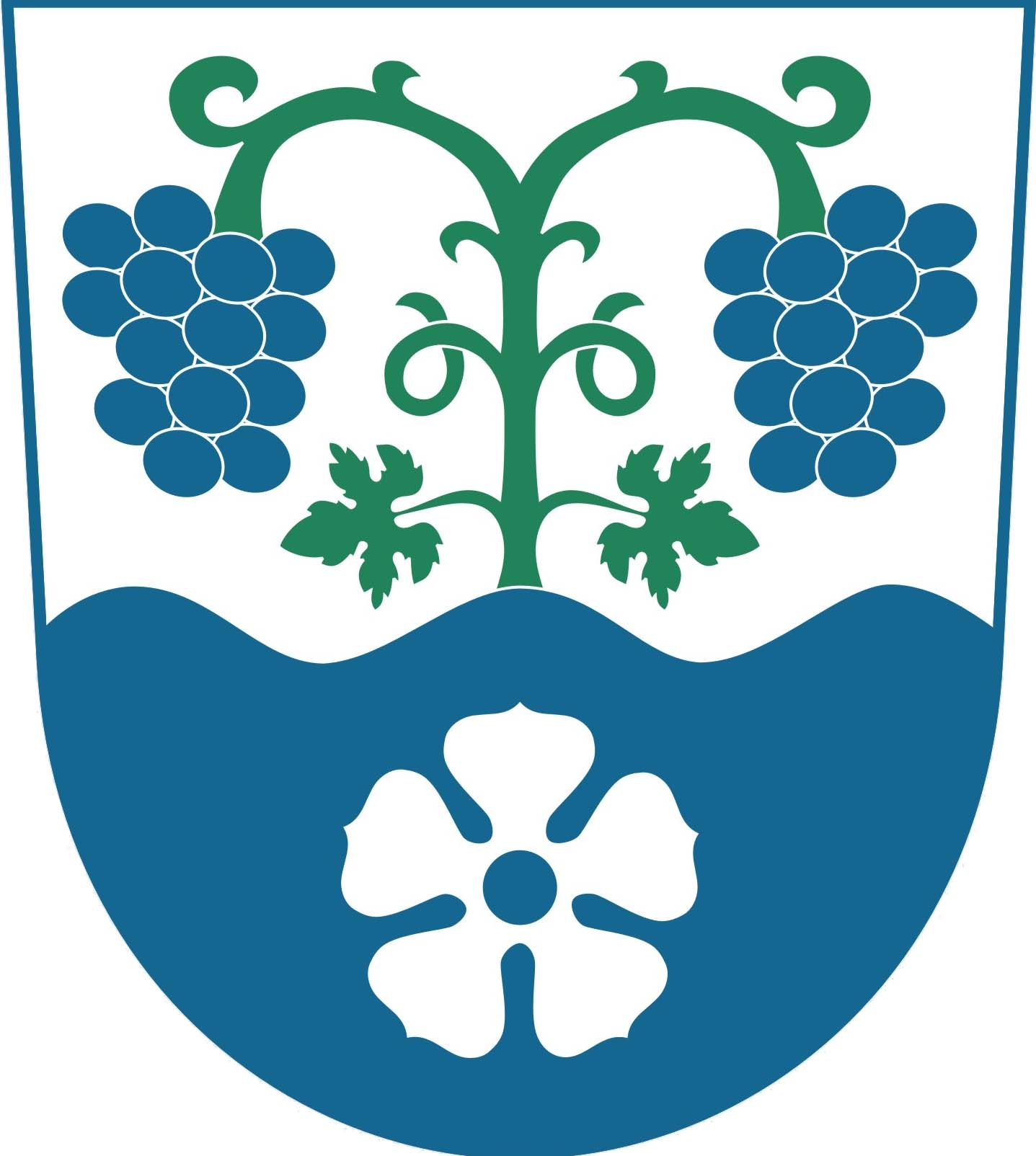
- Flag Coat of arms

- Location in the Czech Republic
- Coordinates: 50°18′32″N 14°30′6″E
- Country: Czech Republic
- Region: Central Bohemian
- District: Mělník
- First mentioned: 1323

Area
  - Total: 10.61 km^{2} (4.10 sq mi)
- Elevation: 159 m (522 ft)

Population (2026-01-01)
  - Total: 1,807
  - Density: 170.3/km^{2} (441.1/sq mi)
- Time zone: UTC+1 (CET)
  - Summer (DST): UTC+2 (CEST)
- Postal code: 277 41
- Website: www.kly.cz

Kly is a municipality and village in Mělník District in the Central Bohemian Region of the Czech Republic. It has about 1,800 inhabitants.

== Administrative division ==
Kly consists of seven municipal parts (in brackets population according to the 2021 census):

- Kly (200)
- Dolní Vinice (208)
- Hoření Vinice (292)
- Krauzovna (220)
- Lom (265)
- Větrušice (109)
- Záboří (335)

== Etymology ==
The name Kly is derived from the personal name Kel, meaning "Kels (the village of Kel's family)". The personal name was derived from the Czech word kel ('tusk'), so the name of the village also translates as 'tusks'.

== Geography ==
Kly is located about 4 kilometres (2 mi) south of Mělník and 20 km (12 mi) north of Prague. It lies in a flat landscape in the Central Elbe Table. The Elbe River flows along the western municipal border. Part of the Úpor – Černínovsko Nature Reserve is located in the municipal territory.

== History ==
The first written mention of Kly is from 1323. The municipality was heavily damaged by the 2002 European floods.

== Demographics ==
Historical population

Year	Pop.	±%
1869	894	—
1880	988	+10.5%
1890	1,015	+2.7%
1900	1,096	+8.0%
1910	1,238	+13.0%

Year	Pop.	±%
1921	1,246	+0.6%
1930	1,313	+5.4%
1950	1,113	−15.2%
1961	1,064	−4.4%
1970	1,049	−1.4%

Year	Pop.	±%
1980	990	−5.6%
1991	894	−9.7%
2001	921	+3.0%
2011	1,303	+41.5%
2021	1,629	+25.0%

Source: Censuses

== Transport ==
The I/9 road (which connects the D8 motorway with Česká Lípa and the Czech–German border) runs through the municipality.

== Sights ==
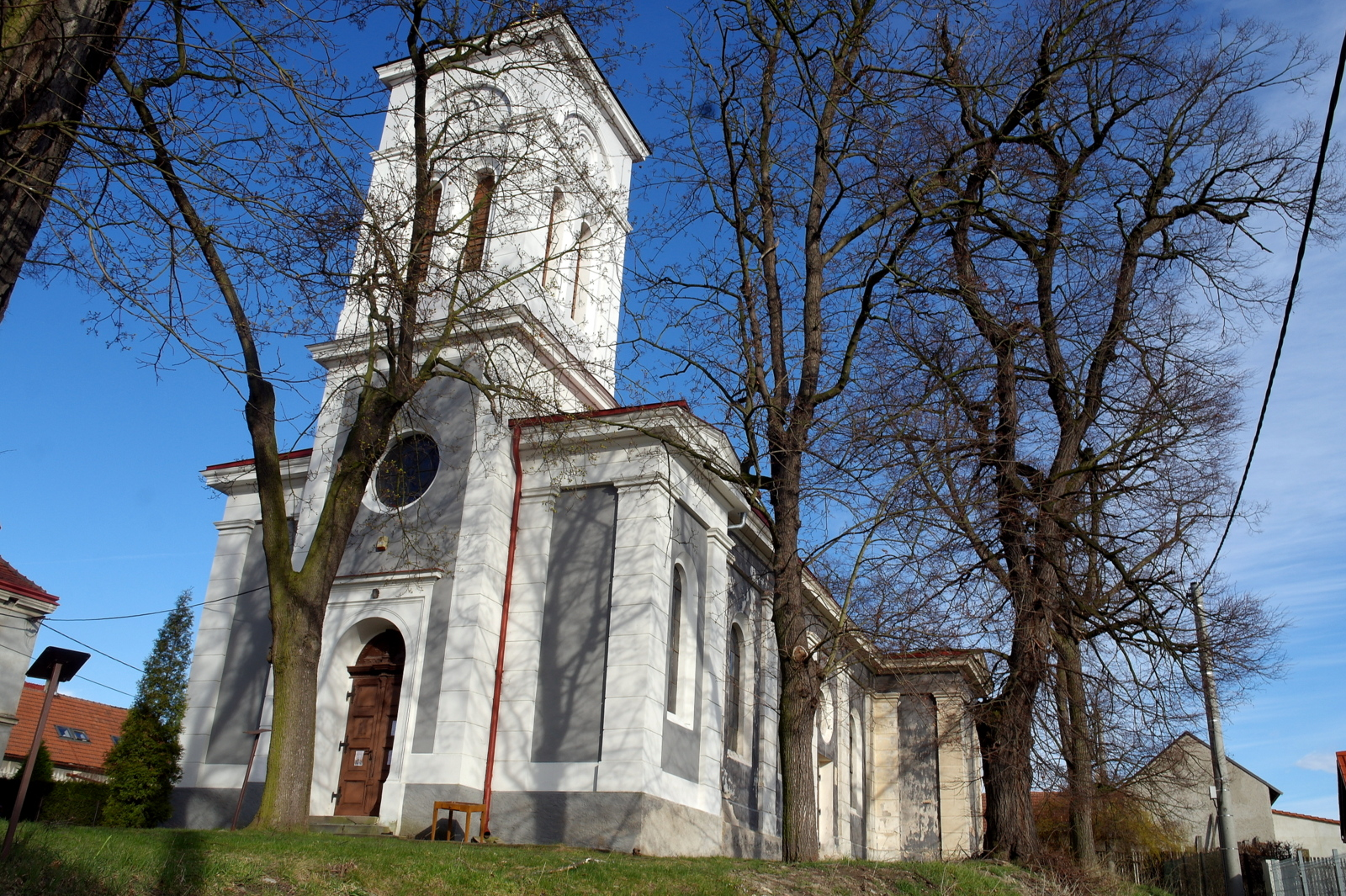
Church of the Nativity of the Virgin Mary

The main landmark is the Church of the Nativity of the Virgin Mary in Záboří. It is a Neo-Renaissance church from 1884, which replaced the old Gothic church.

In the centre of Kly is the Chapel of Saint Wenceslaus. It dates from 1886.
