= Charles Heber Dickerman =

American politician (1843–1915)

Charles H. Dickerman
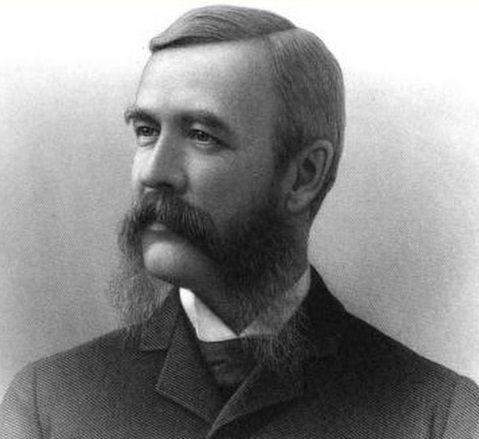
- Dickerman in 1911

Member of the U.S. House of Representatives from Pennsylvania's 16th district
- In office March 4, 1903 – March 3, 1905
- Preceded by: Elias Deemer
- Succeeded by: Edmund W. Samuel

Personal details
- Born: February 3, 1843 Harford, Pennsylvania, U.S.
- Died: December 17, 1915 (aged 72) Milton, Pennsylvania, U.S.
- Party: Democratic
- Education: Harford University

Charles Heber Dickerman (February 3, 1843 – December 17, 1915) was a Democratic member of the U.S. House of Representatives from Pennsylvania.

== Early life and education ==
Charles H. Dickerman was born in Harford, Pennsylvania. He attended the public schools of his native village and graduated from Harford University in Harford in 1860.

== Career ==
He taught school for several years. He studied law, but before qualifying for admission to the bar became bookkeeper for a large coal company in Beaver Meadows, Pennsylvania. He was interested in the coal commission business and slate quarrying in 1868 at Bethlehem, Pennsylvania. He served as secretary and treasurer of a concern engaged in the manufacture of railroad equipment at Milton, Pennsylvania, from 1880 to 1899. He was interested in banking at Mauch Chunk, Sunbury, and Bethlehem, and in 1897 became president of the First National Bank at Milton, in which capacity he served until his death.

Dickerman was chairman of the Northumberland County Democratic committee for three years. He was a delegate to the State constitutional convention in 1891, and to the 1892 Democratic National Convention.

He was elected as a Democrat to the Fifty-eighth Congress. He declined to be a candidate for renomination in 1904. He was appointed by President Theodore Roosevelt as a delegate to the Brussels Peace Congress in 1905.

== Death ==
Dickerman died in Milton, Pennsylvania, on December 17, 1915, and was interred in Milton Cemetery.

U.S. House of Representatives
Preceded by Elias Deemer	Member of the U.S. House of Representatives from Pennsylvania's 16th congressional district 1903–1905	Succeeded by Edmund W. Samuel
