= William Seymour Tyler =

American historian (1810–1897)

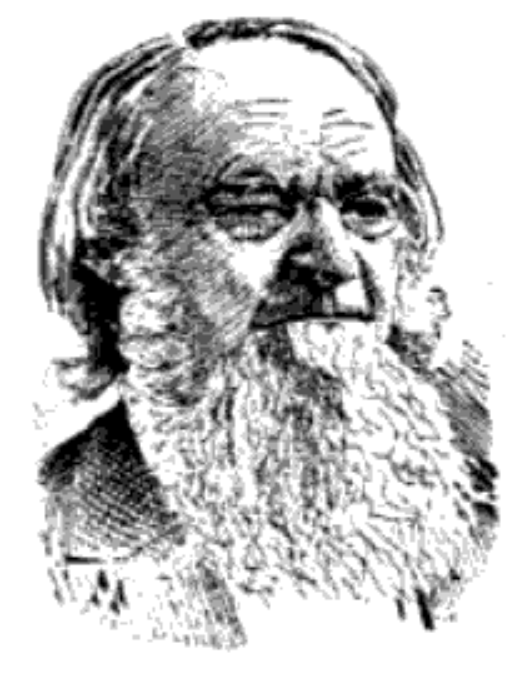
- Born: September 2, 1810; Harford, Pennsylvania, U.S.
- Died: November 19, 1897 (aged 87); Amherst, Massachusetts, U.S.
- Education: Amherst
- Occupations: Historian, educator
- Spouse: Amelia Ogden (m. 1839)
- Children: 4

William Seymour Tyler (September 2, 1810 – November 19, 1897) was the Amherst College, Massachusetts, historian during his tenure as professor of Latin, Greek, and Greek literature from 1832 to 1893.

== Biography ==
He was born September 2, 1810, in Harford, Pennsylvania, the son of Joab and Nabby née Seymour Tyler. He matriculated at Amherst in 1829, graduated in 1830 (cf. external links below), and completed his M.A. in (1833). He tutored at Amherst from 1832 to 1834 and in 1836. He was a professor of Latin and Greek at Amherst from 1836 to 1847, and professor of Greek from 1847 to 1893. He was named professor emeritus in 1893 (1893–97). From 1835 to 1836 he studied theology under Dr. Skinner in New York, and on September 4, 1839, he married Amelia Ogden, daughter of Mason Whiting of New York. They had four sons. He was ordained a minister in North Amherst, Massachusetts on October 16, 1859. He received the honorary DD degree from Harvard University (1857) and two honorary LL.D. degrees from Amherst (1871) and Harvard (1886). He died in Amherst on November 19, 1897.

He edited many Greek and Latin texts, and was the author of History of Amherst College During Its First Half Century (1872) and History of Amherst College during the Administration of its First Five Presidents (1894). In the latter he claimed that Amherst was the first U.S. college to use Latin honors, although it appears that Harvard deserves that distinction.

William Seymour Tyler was one of the original trustees of Smith College and one of the residential houses on campus, Tyler House, was named after him. Tyler House, a dormitory building at Amherst College, was also named in his honor.
