= Senator Hackett =

Senator Hackett may refer to:

- Bob Hackett (born 1949), Ohio State Senate
- Thomas C. Hackett (c. 1798–1851), Georgia State Senate
- William Clayton Hackett (1874–1930), Pennsylvania State Senate
