= Attorney General Cassidy =

Attorney General Cassidy may refer to:

- John Edward Cassidy (1896–1984), Attorney General of Illinois
- Lewis C. Cassidy (1829–1889), Attorney General of Pennsylvania

== See also ==
- General Cassidy (disambiguation)
