= Mutchler =

Mutchler is a surname. Notable people with the surname include:

- Howard Mutchler (1859–1916), American politician
- William Mutchler (1831–1893), American politician

== See also ==
- 6815 Mutchler, a main-belt asteroid
