= Senator Packer =

Senator Packer may refer to:

- Horace B. Packer (1851–1940), Pennsylvania State Senate
- William F. Packer (1807–1870), Pennsylvania State Senate
