= Easton Cemetery =

United States historic place in Pennsylvania

- U.S. National Register of Historic Places
- U.S. Historic district
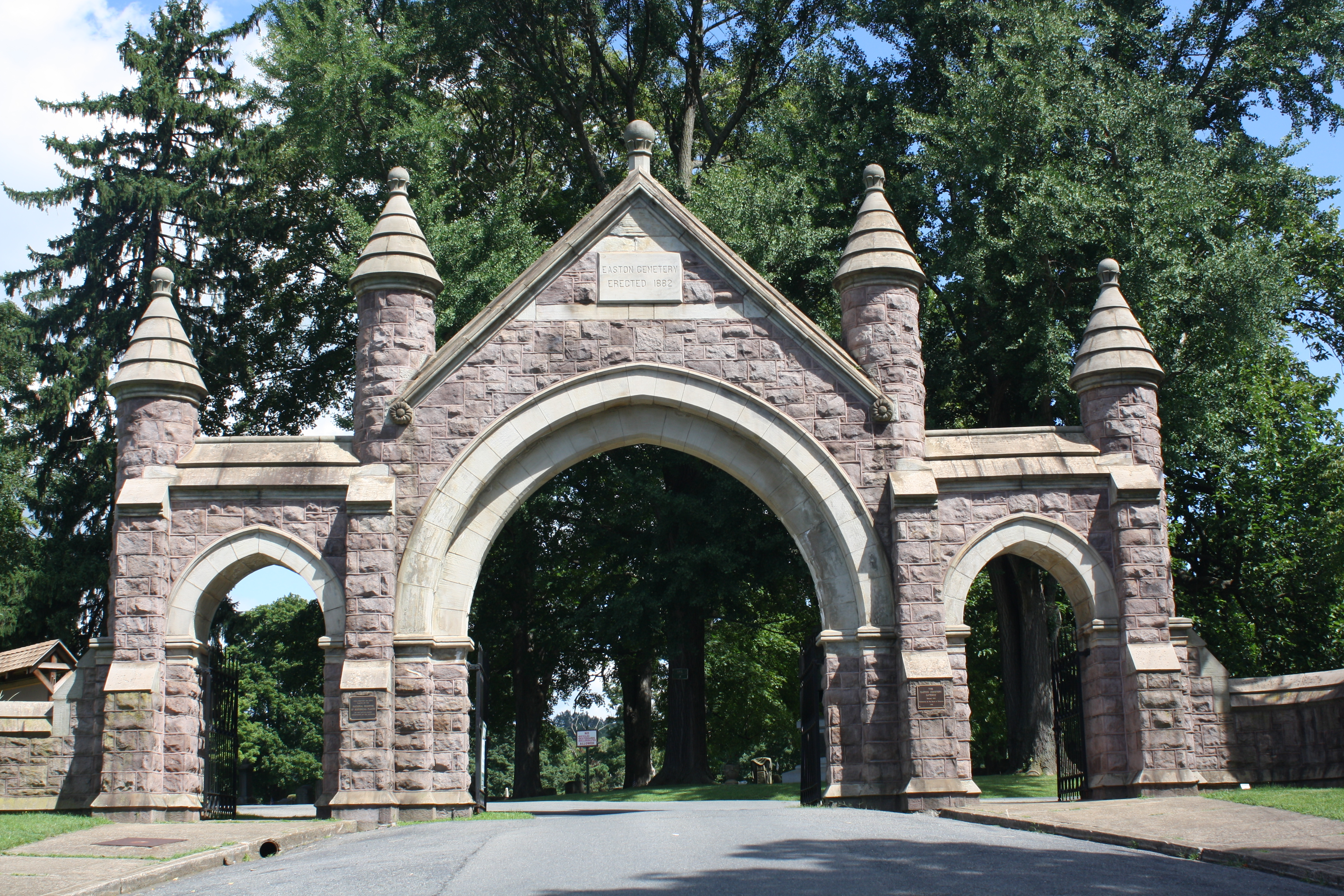
- Easton Cemetery's Seventh Street Gate, August 2013

- Location within Pennsylvania Location within the United States
- Location: 401 N. Seventh Street, Easton, Pennsylvania, U.S.
- Coordinates: 40°41′55″N 75°13′7″W
- Area: 84 acres (34 ha)
- Built: 1849
- Architect: Sidney, James Charles; Sebring, William
- Architectural style: Greek Revival, Late Victorian, Gothic
- NRHP reference No.: 90001610
- Added to NRHP: October 25, 1990

Easton Cemetery is a historic rural cemetery located in Easton, Pennsylvania, established in 1849. It is the burial site of many notable individuals.

Easton Cemetery's parklike cemetery landscape design is based on the picturesque romantic styles of the early and late 19th century. Its landscape is set with thousands of examples of funeral artwork, in a variety of decorative styles, spanning Greco-Roman Revival, Gothic Victorian, and Art Deco. Easton Cemetery is the earliest and best surviving example of a romantic parklike cemetery within the Lehigh Valley metro area. Architecturally noteworthy features include a Gothic Revival Gatehouse and office, stable, cemetery chapel, and a Gothic frame workshop. Its first president was prominent Easton citizen, Traill Green.

In 1990, the cemetery was added to the National Register of Historic Places.

== Notable burials ==
- Fred Ashton (1931–2013), Mayor of Easton, Pennsylvania from 1968 to 1976
- Joseph Davis Brodhead (1859–1920), Member of Congress, 1907 to 1909
- Richard Brodhead (1811–1863), 19th century Pennsylvania state legislator
- Charles F. Chidsey (1843–1933) first mayor of Easton (1887 to 1889) and State Representative (1896 to 1898)
- Thomas Coates (1803–1895), "the Father of Band Music in America," and conductor, Regimental Band, Union Army's 47th Pennsylvania Infantry Regiment
- Jacob Dachrodt (1828–1909), American Civil War captain, State Senator, 1887 to 1891
- Joseph Marion Hackett (1831-1912), State Representative, 1879 to 1881
- William Clayton Hackett (1874–1930), State Senator, 1915 to 1922
- Peter Ihrie Jr. (1796–1871), Member of Congress, 1829 to 1833
- Philip Johnson (1818–1867), Member of Congress, 1863 to 1867
- William Sebring Kirkpatrick (1844–1932), Member of Congress, 1897 to 1899
- Howard Mutchler (1859–1916), Member of Congress, 1893 to 1895 and 1901 to 1903
- William Mutchler (1831–1893), Member of Congress, 1875 to 1877, 1881 to 1885, and 1889 to 1893
- James Madison Porter (1793–1862), U.S. Secretary of War, 1843 to 1844, and founder of Lafayette College
- James F. Randolph (1791–1872), Member of Congress, 1828 to 1823
- Joseph Fitz Randolph (1803–1873), Member of Congress, 1837 to 1843
- Andrew Horatio Reeder (1807–1864), Kansas Territory governor, 1854 to 1855
- Jeanette Reibman (1915–2006), member of Pennsylvania House of Representatives, 1955 to 1966, and Pennsylvania State Senate, 1969 to 1994 and trustee, Lafayette College, 1970 to 1985
- Samuel Sitgreaves (1764–1827), Member of Congress, 1797 to 1798
- Henry Joseph Steele (1860–1933), Member of Congress, 1915 to 1921
- George Taylor (1716–1781), founding father who signed the Declaration of Independence
- David Douglas Wagener (1792–1860), Member of Congress (1833 to 1841)
- Charles A. Wikoff (1837–1898), Union Army officer in American Civil War later killed in action in Spanish–American War
- C. Meyer Zulick (1838–1926), Arizona Territory governor, 1885 to 1889

== Gallery ==
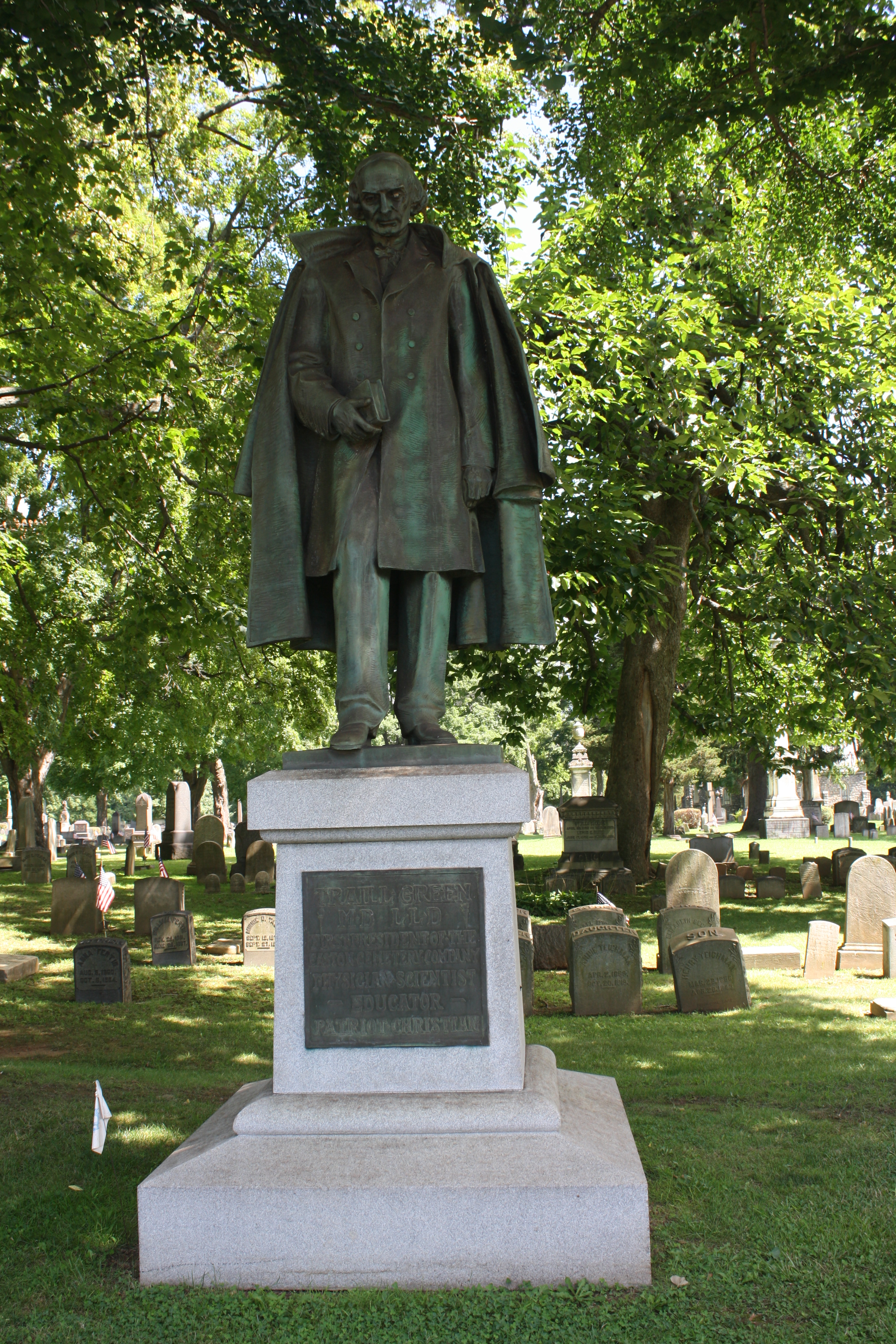
Traill Green statue

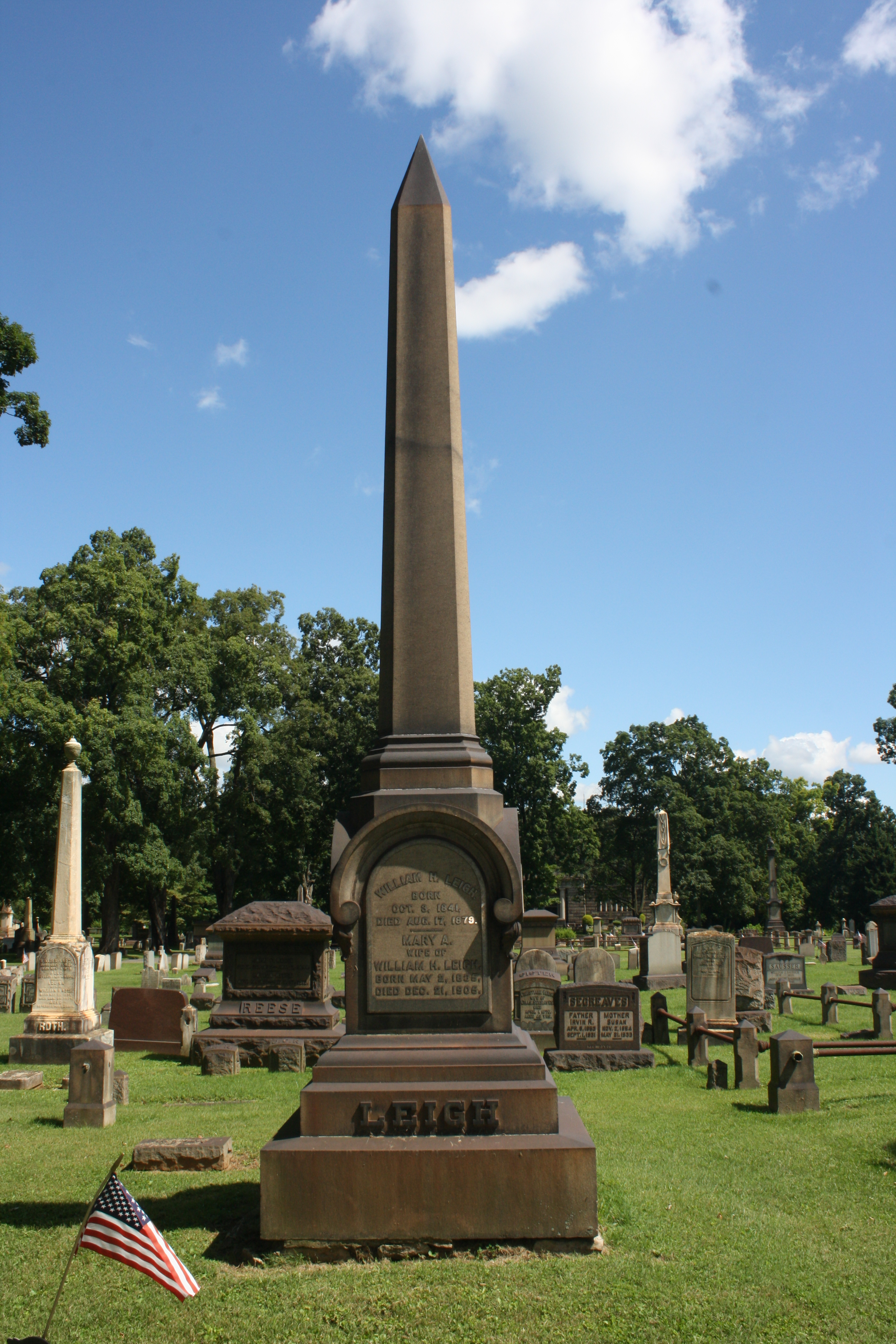
Leigh obelisk

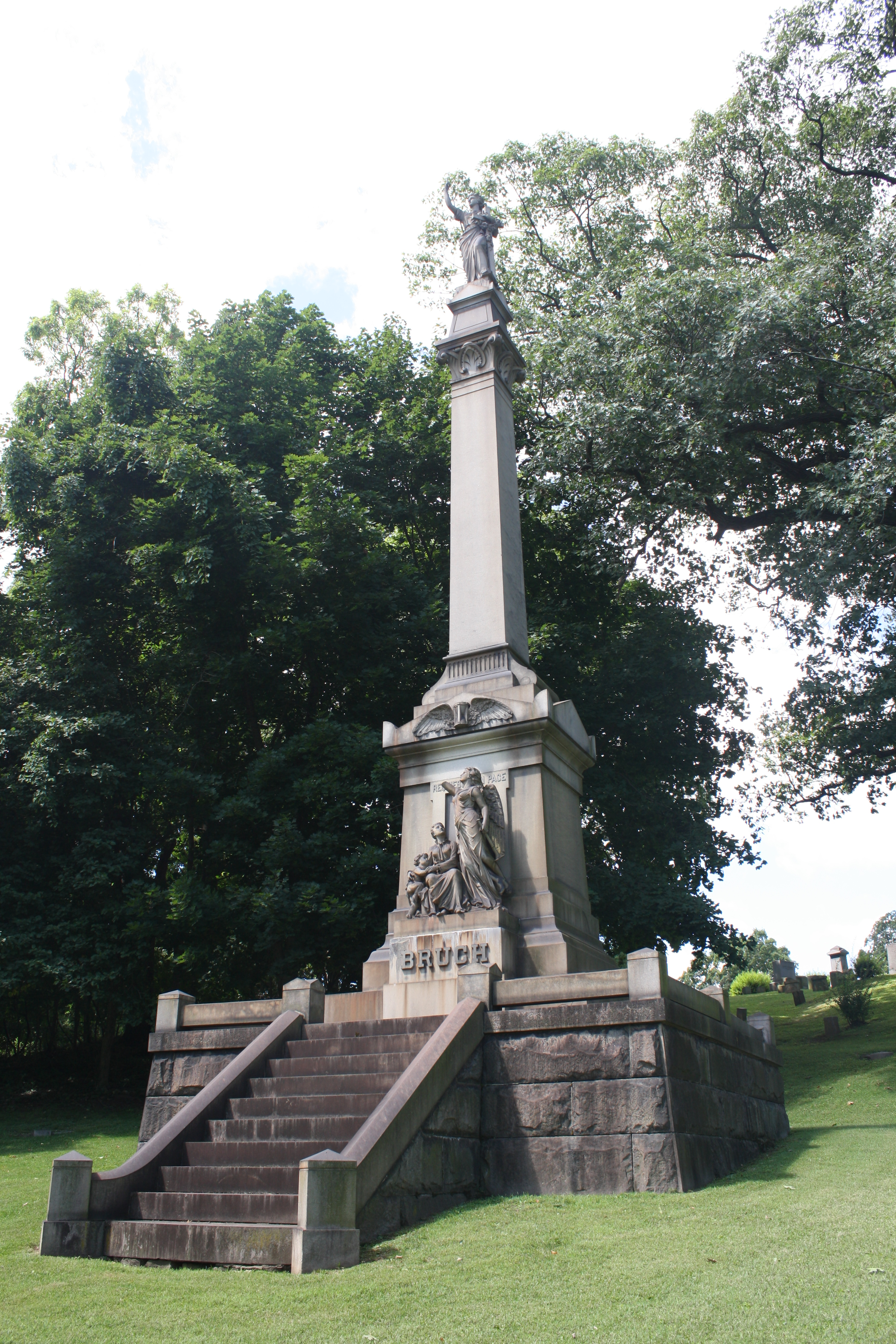
Bruch monument

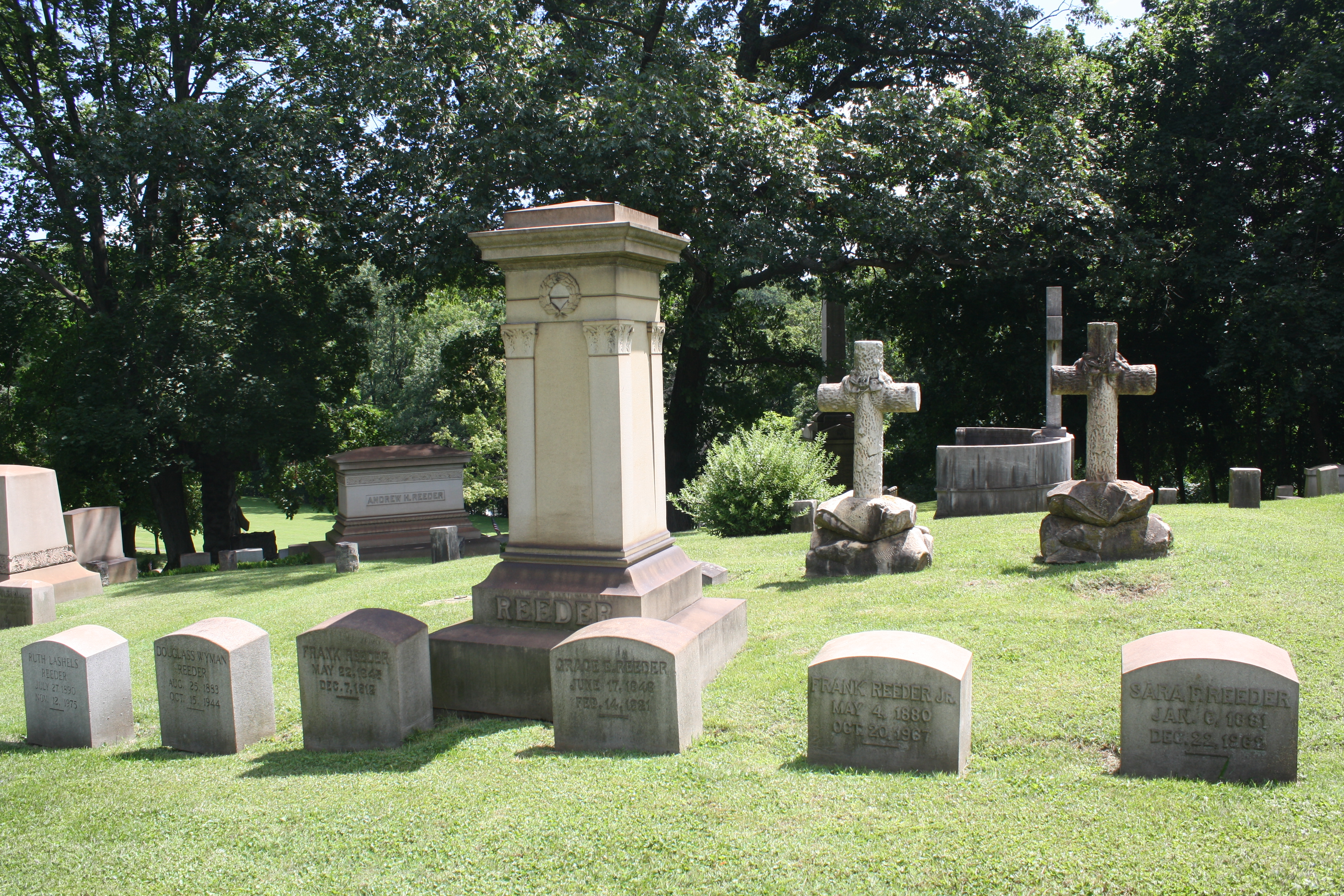
Reeder plot

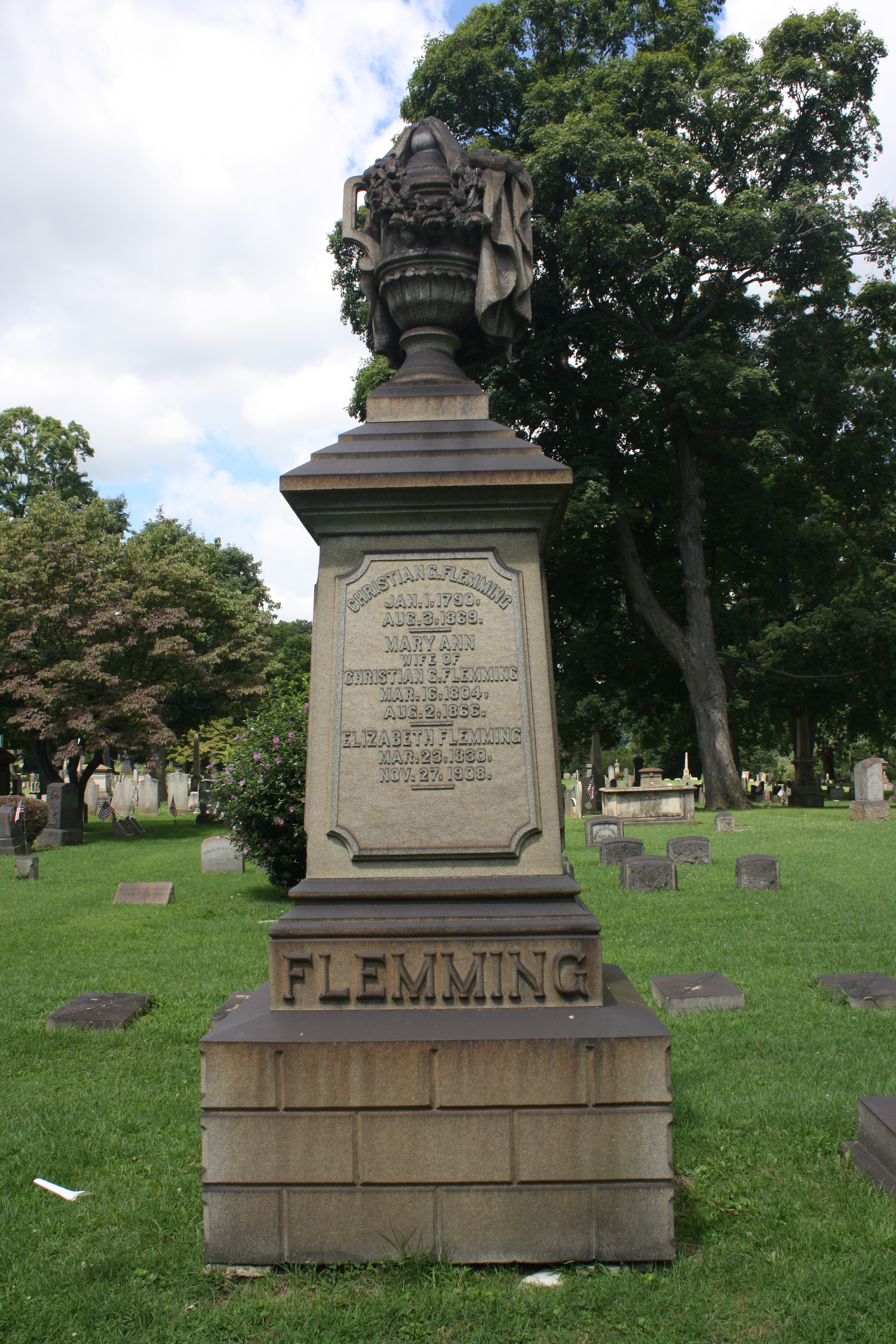
Flemming monument

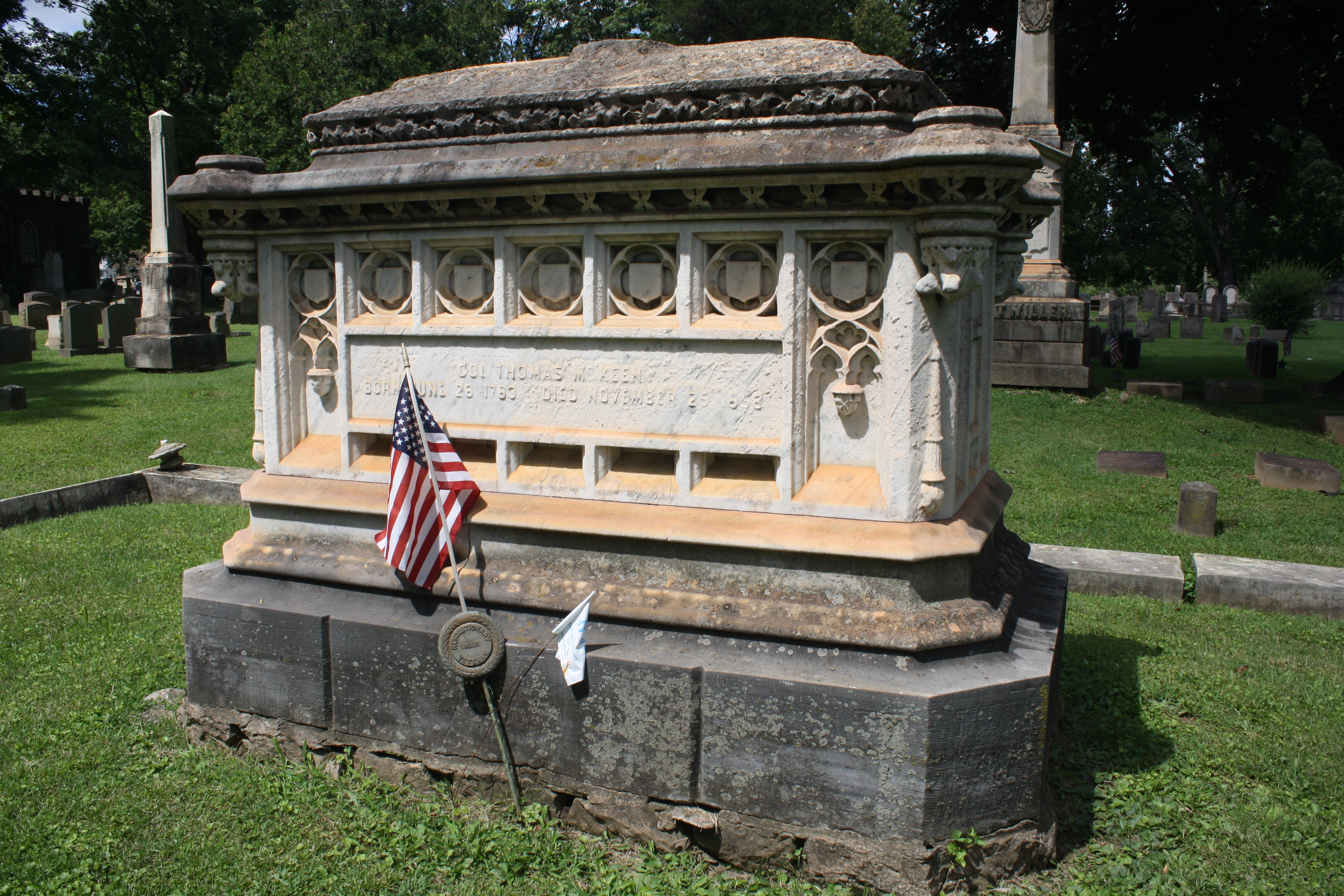
Col. Thomas McKeen (1763–1858) monument

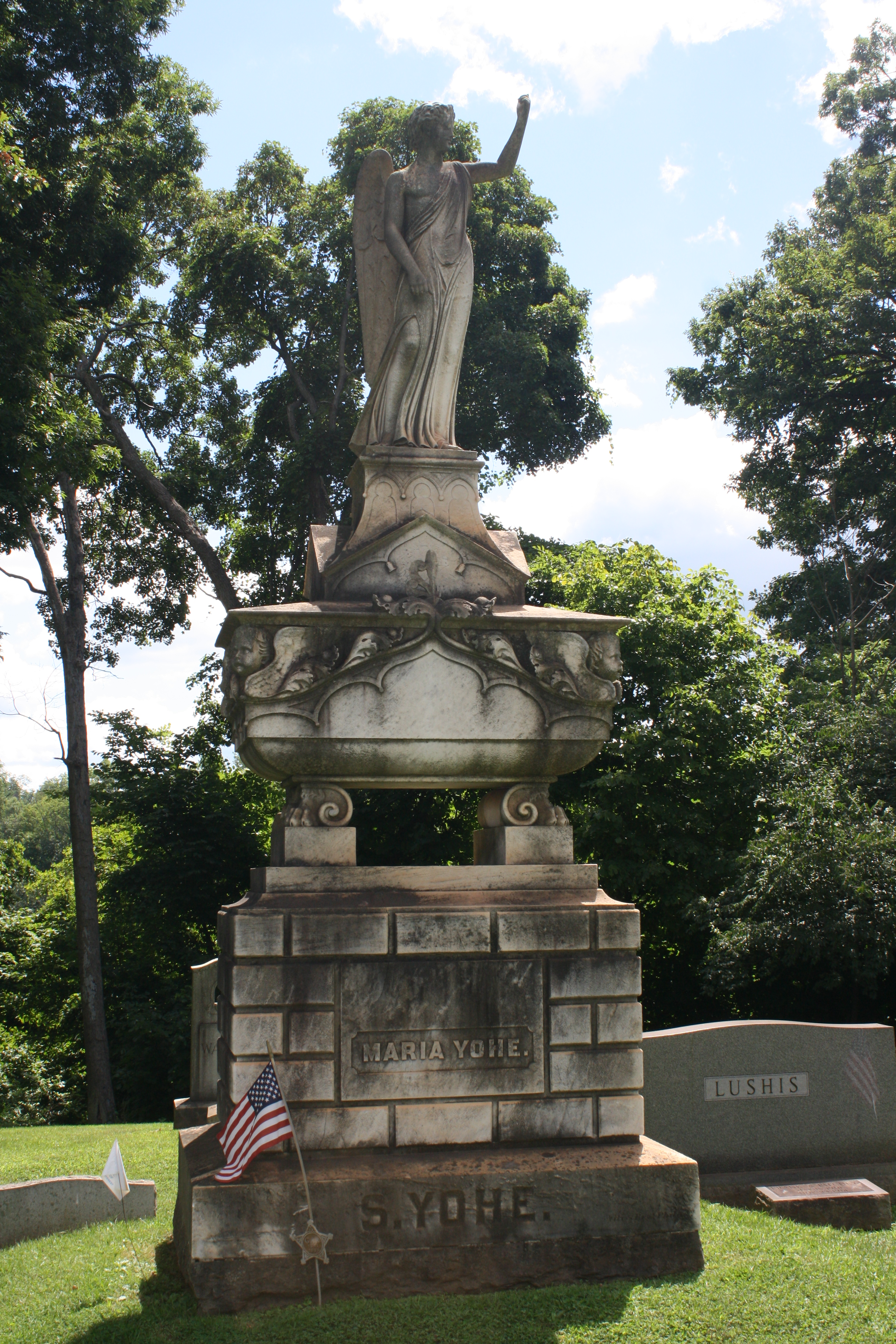
Yohe monument

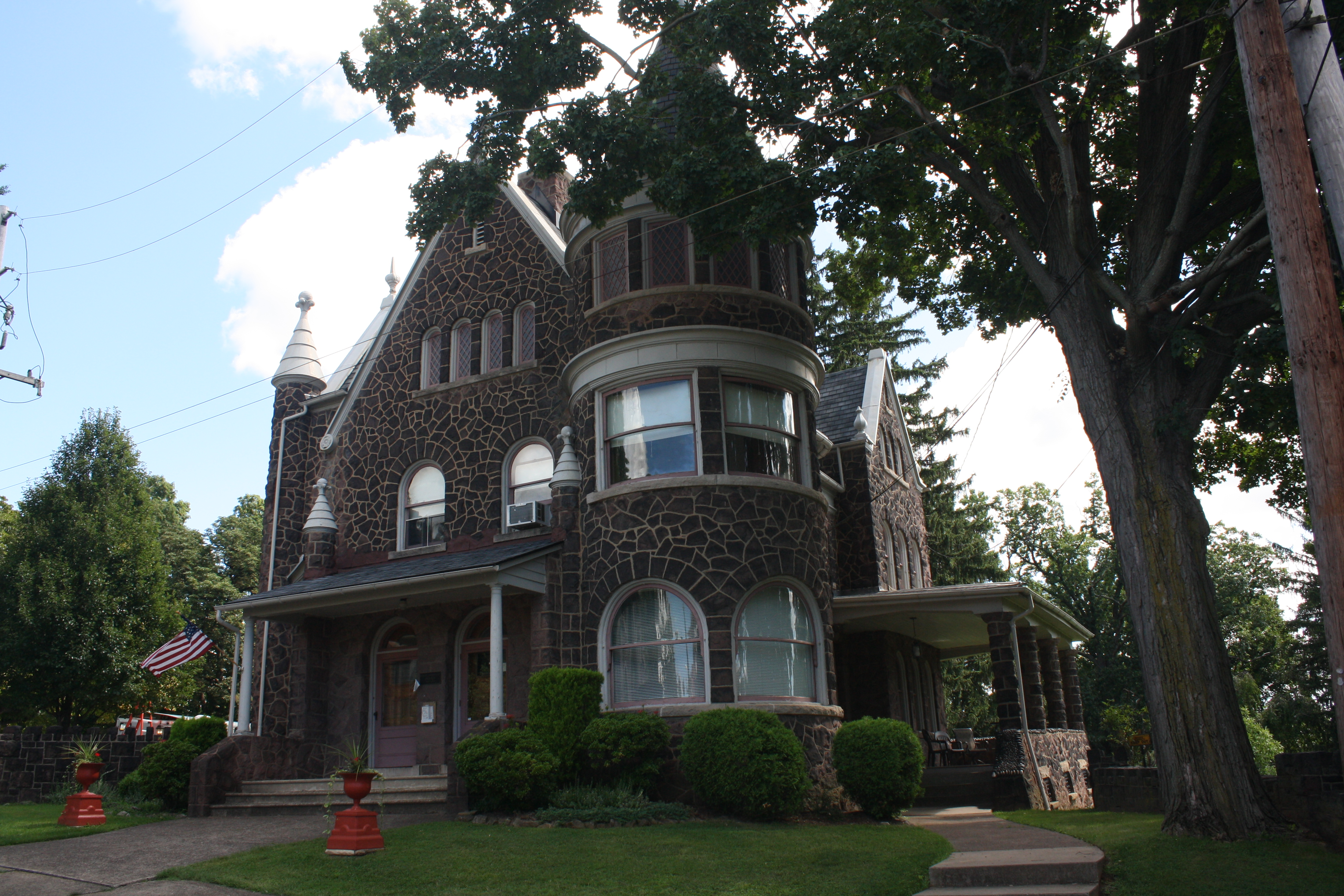
Gothic Revival Gatehouse and office (1900–1901)

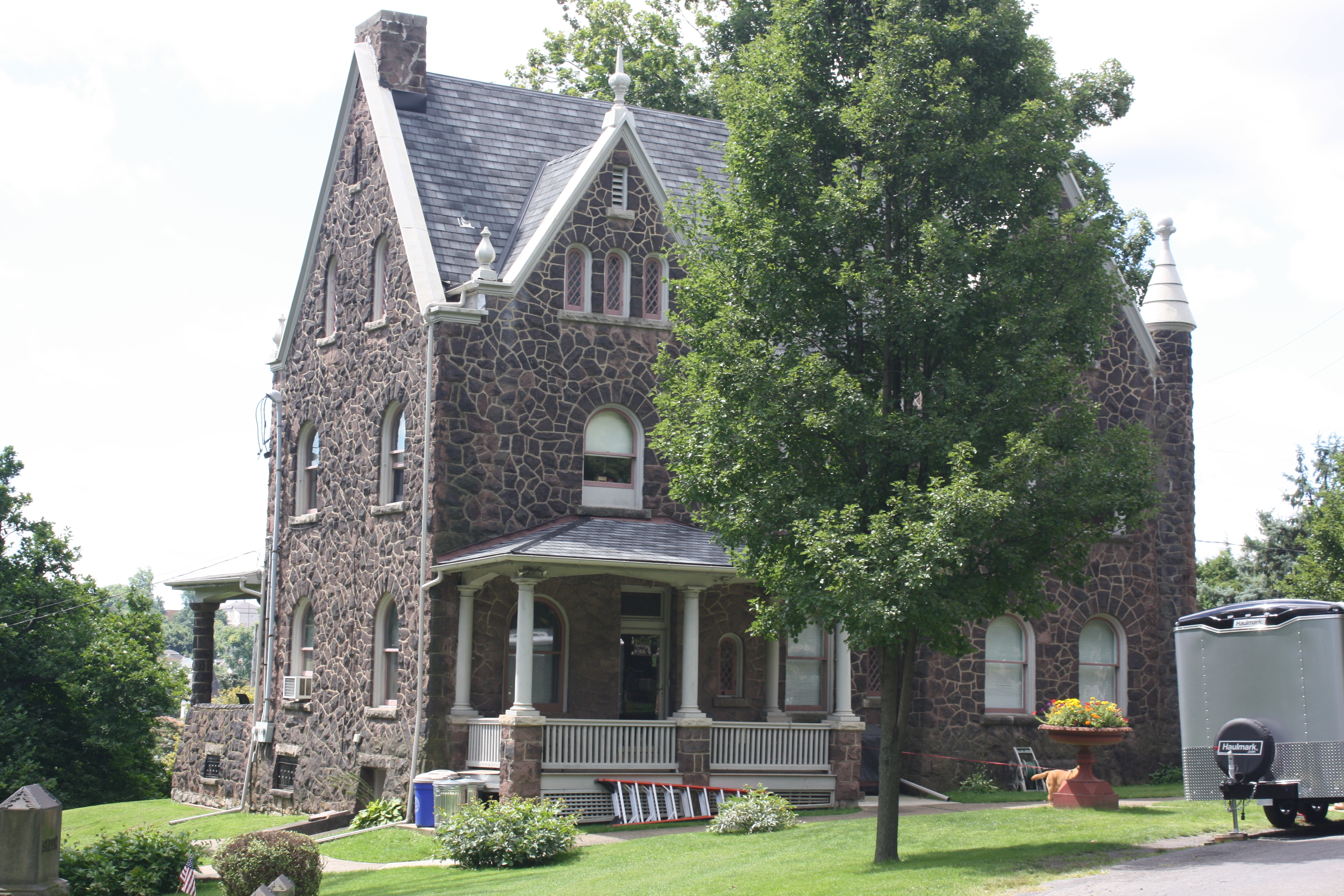
Gatehouse North wing.

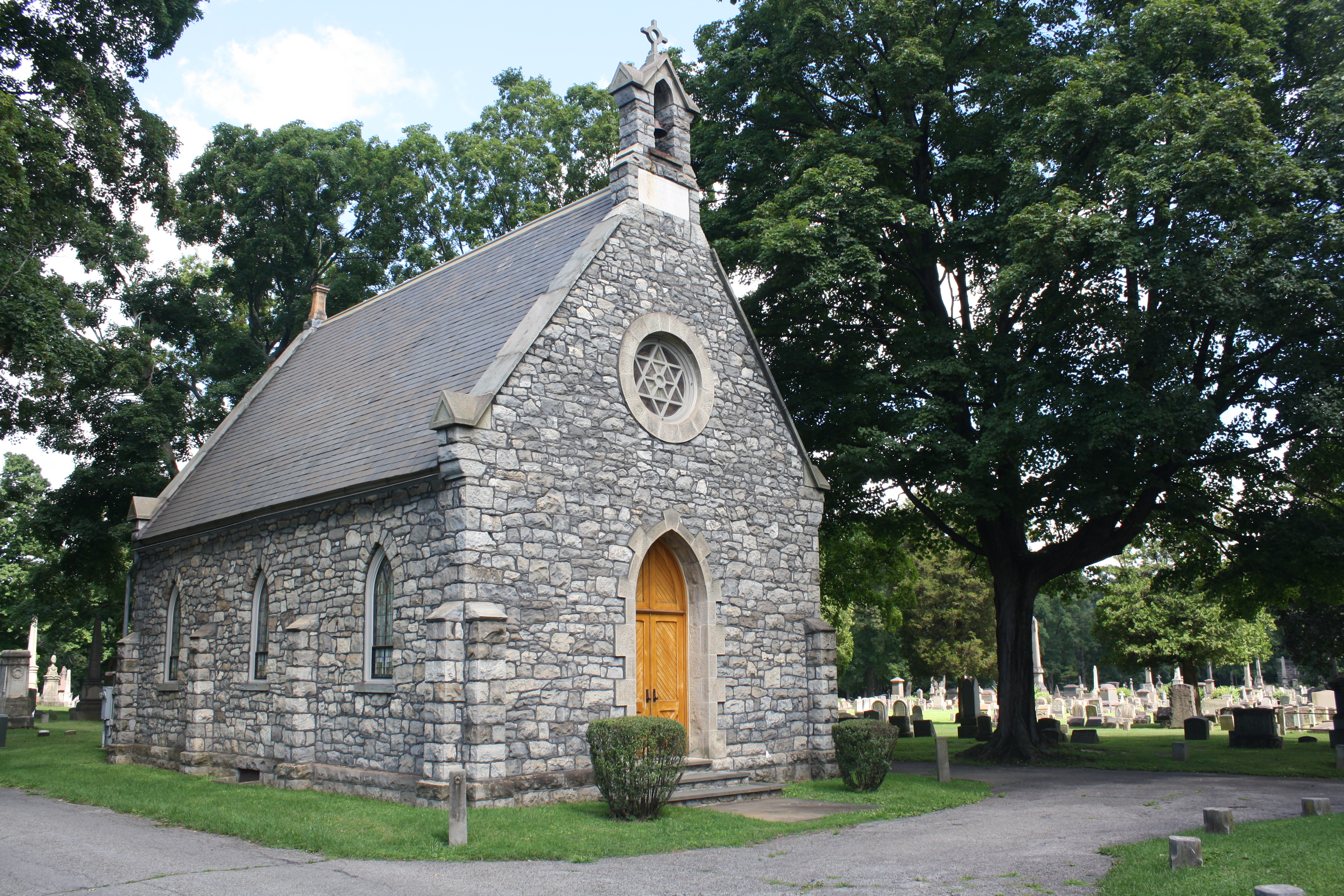
Cemetery Chapel

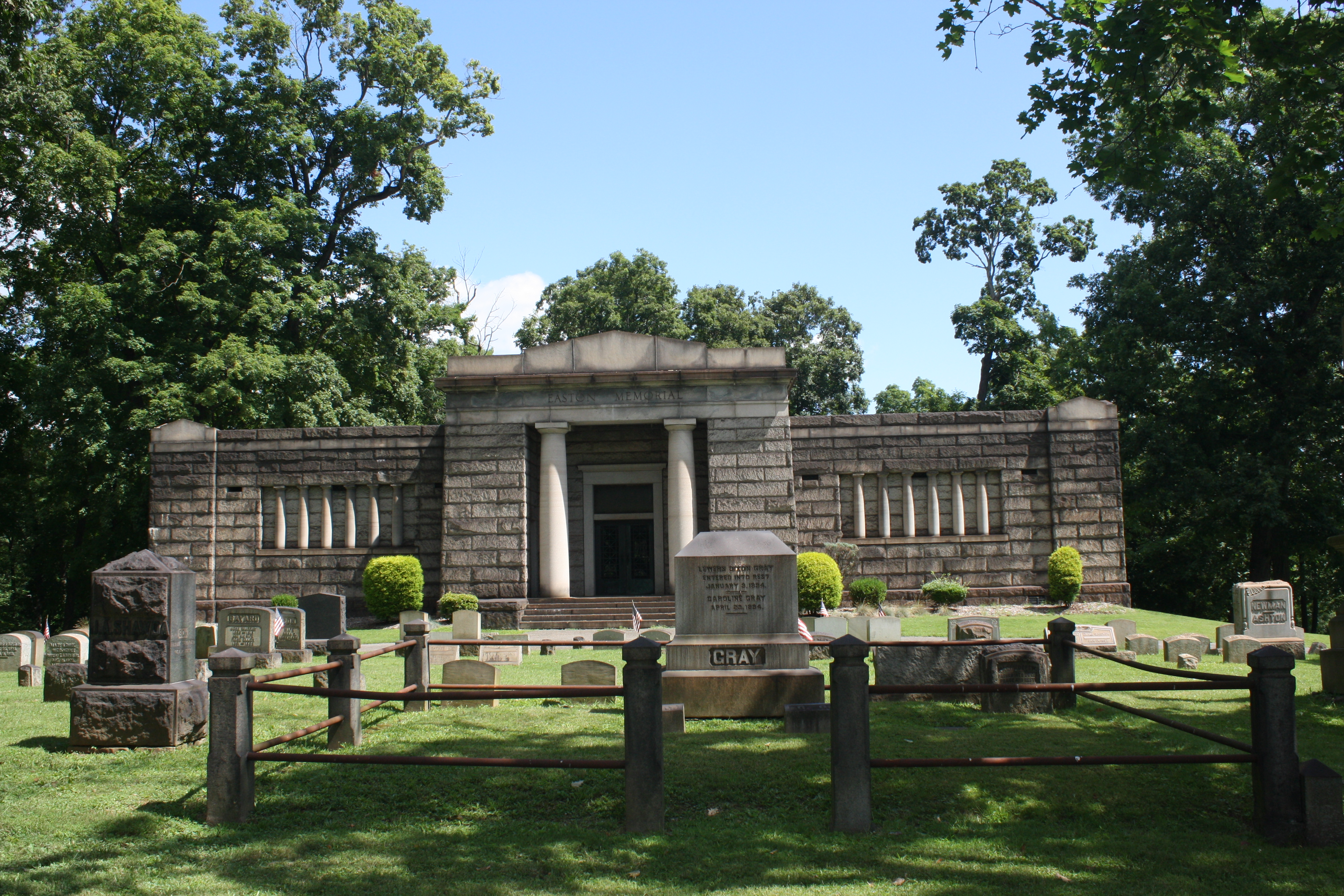
Memorial

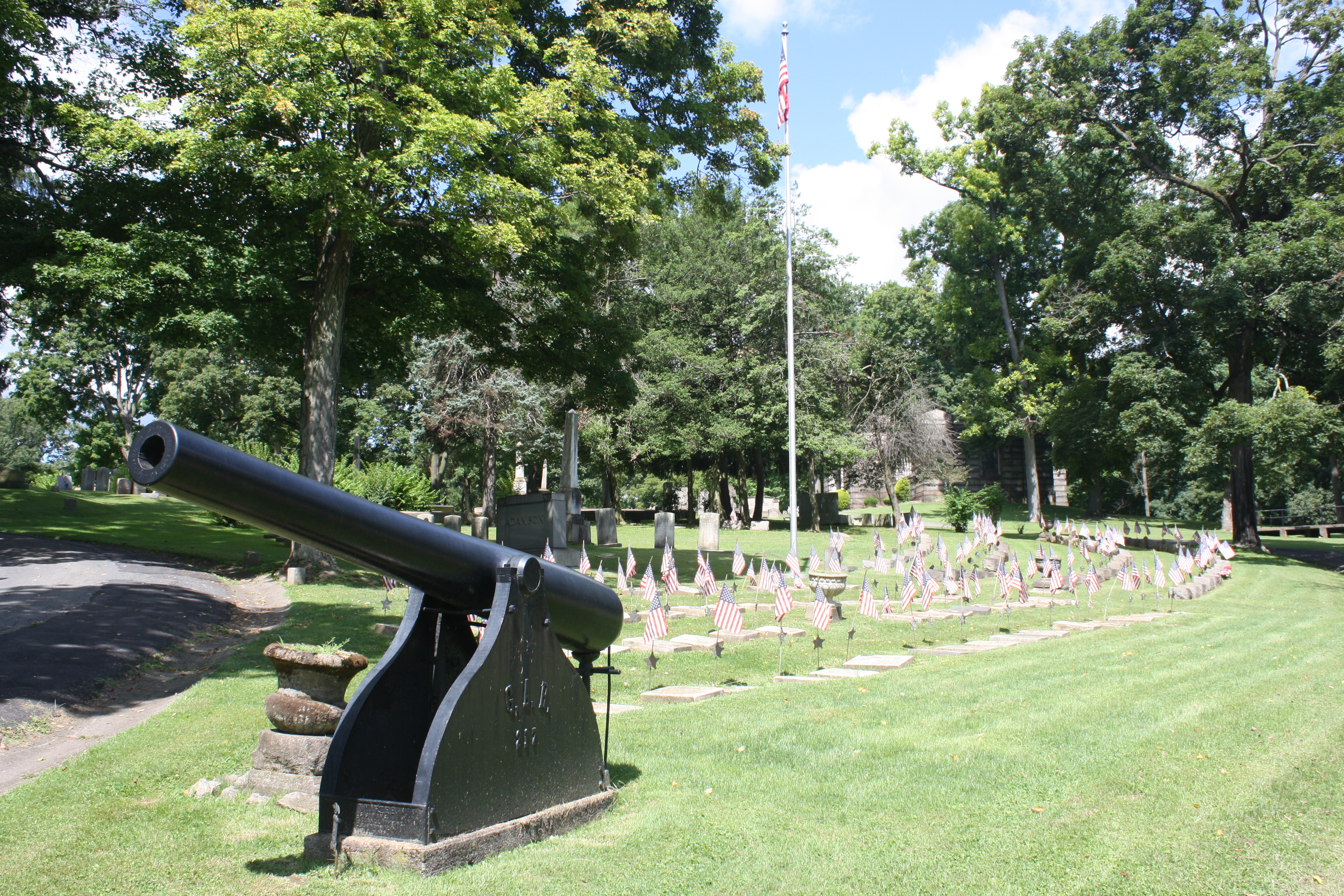
Grand Army of the Republic Cannon and military plot
