= Elmer, Pennsylvania =

Unincorporated community in Pennsylvania, US

- Unincorporated community
- Location within Pennsylvania Location within the United States
- Coordinates: 41°55′10″N 77°37′24″W
- Country: United States
- State: Pennsylvania
- County: Potter
- Elevation: 1,512 ft (461 m)
- Time zone: UTC-5 (Eastern (EST))
  - Summer (DST): UTC-4 (EDT)
- Area code: 814
- GNIS feature ID: 1174174

Elmer is an unincorporated community in Potter County, Pennsylvania, United States.

== Notable person ==
- Fred Churchill Leonard, member of the United States House of Representatives, was born in Elmer.
