= Joseph J. Hart =

American politician (1859–1926)

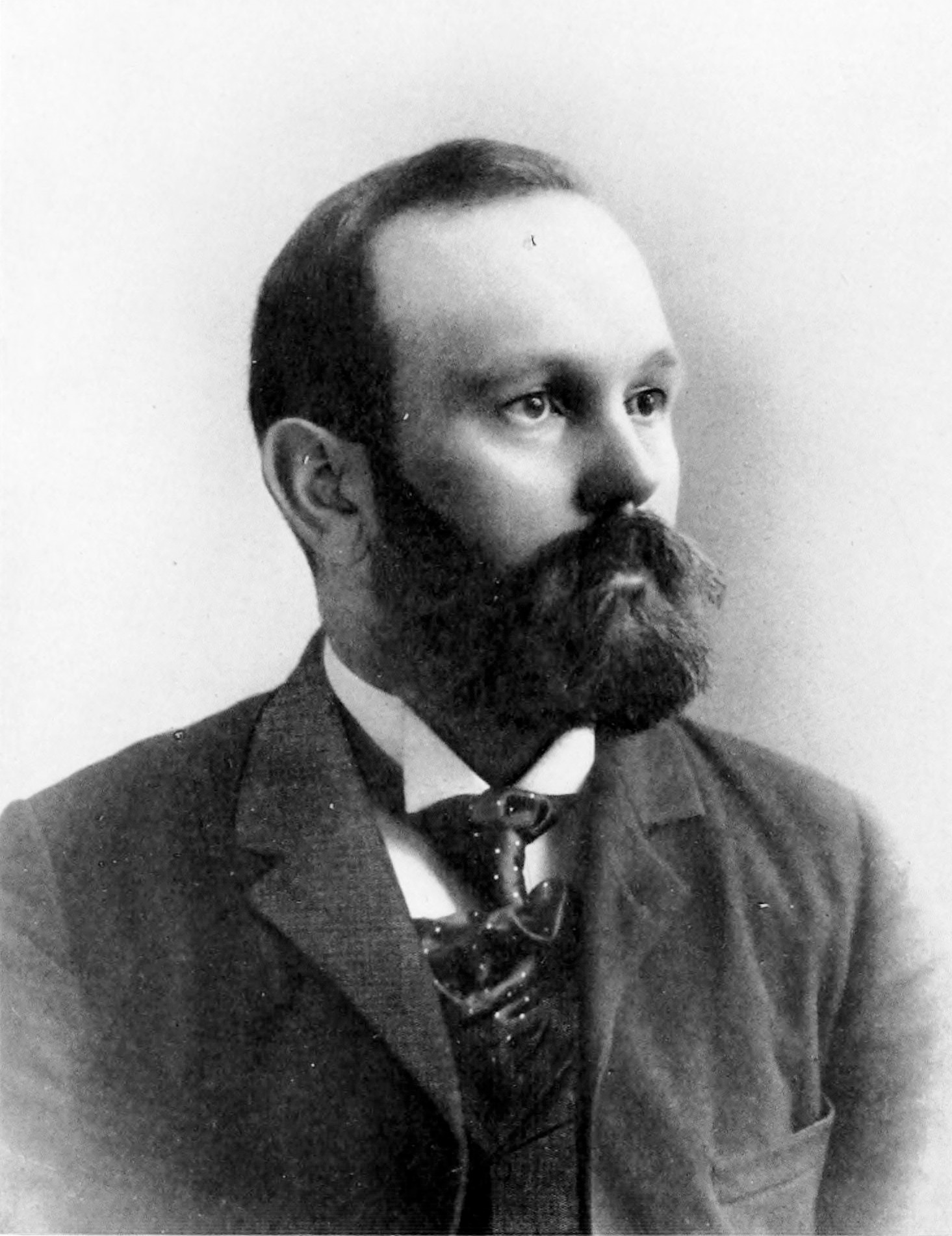
- From 1900's Commemorative Biographical Record of Northeastern Pennsylvania.

Member of the U.S. House of Representatives from Pennsylvania's 8th district
- In office March 4, 1895 – March 3, 1897
- Preceded by: Howard Mutchler
- Succeeded by: William Sebring Kirkpatrick

Personal details
- Born: April 18, 1859 Nyack, New York, U.S.
- Died: July 13, 1926 (aged 67) New York City, U.S.
- Party: Democratic
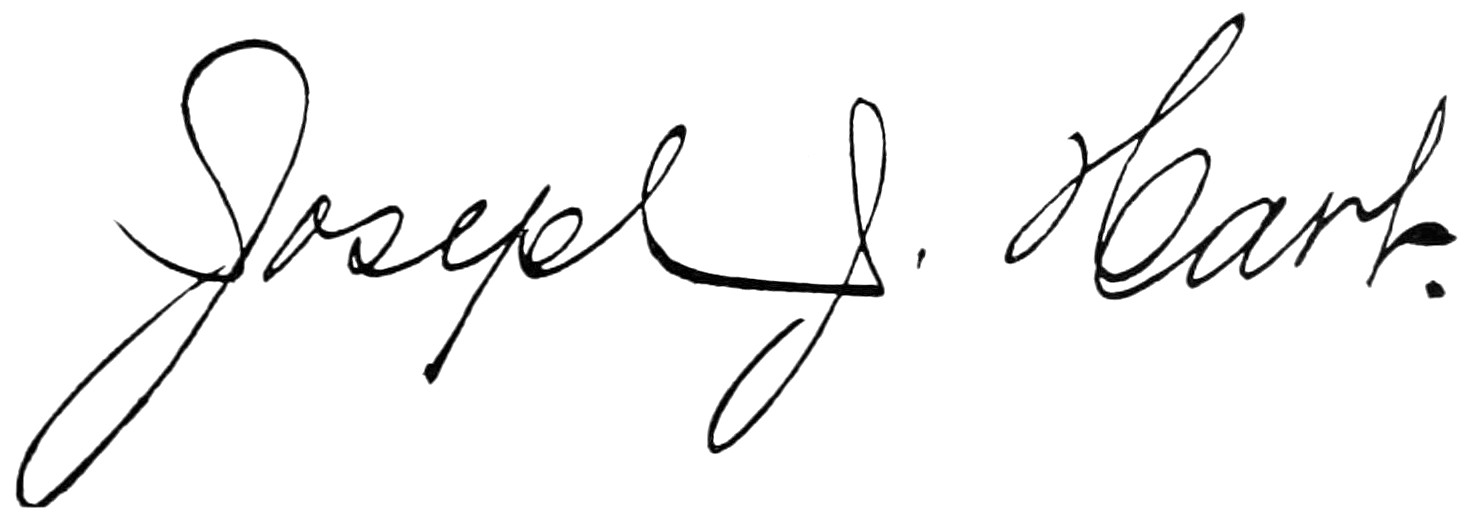
- Signature

Joseph Johnson Hart (April 18, 1859 – July 13, 1926) was a Democratic member of the U.S. House of Representatives from Pennsylvania.

== Biography ==
Joseph J. Hart was born in Nyack, New York. He attended the schools of Nyack and was graduated from the Charlier Institute in New York City, in 1876. He conducted and owned City and Country, a Democratic newspaper of Nyack, until 1883, when he moved to Pike County, Pennsylvania, where he engaged in the real estate, lumber, and insurance businesses. He served as school director of Milford, Pennsylvania. He conducted and owned the Milford Dispatch from 1890 to 1900.

Hart was elected as a Democrat to the Fifty-fourth Congress. He was not a candidate for renomination in 1896. He resumed his newspaper interests in Milford. In 1900 moved to New York City and engaged in clerical work. He was the deputy tax commissioner of the city of New York from 1907 until his death in Brooklyn, New York. Interment in Oak Hill Cemetery, Nyack, N.Y.

== Sources ==
- United States Congress. "Joseph J. Hart (id: H000289)". Biographical Directory of the United States Congress.
- The Political Graveyard

U.S. House of Representatives
Preceded by Howard Mutchler	Member of the U.S. House of Representatives from Pennsylvania's 8th congressional district 1895-1897	Succeeded by William Sebring Kirkpatrick
