= Edmund W. Samuel =

American politician

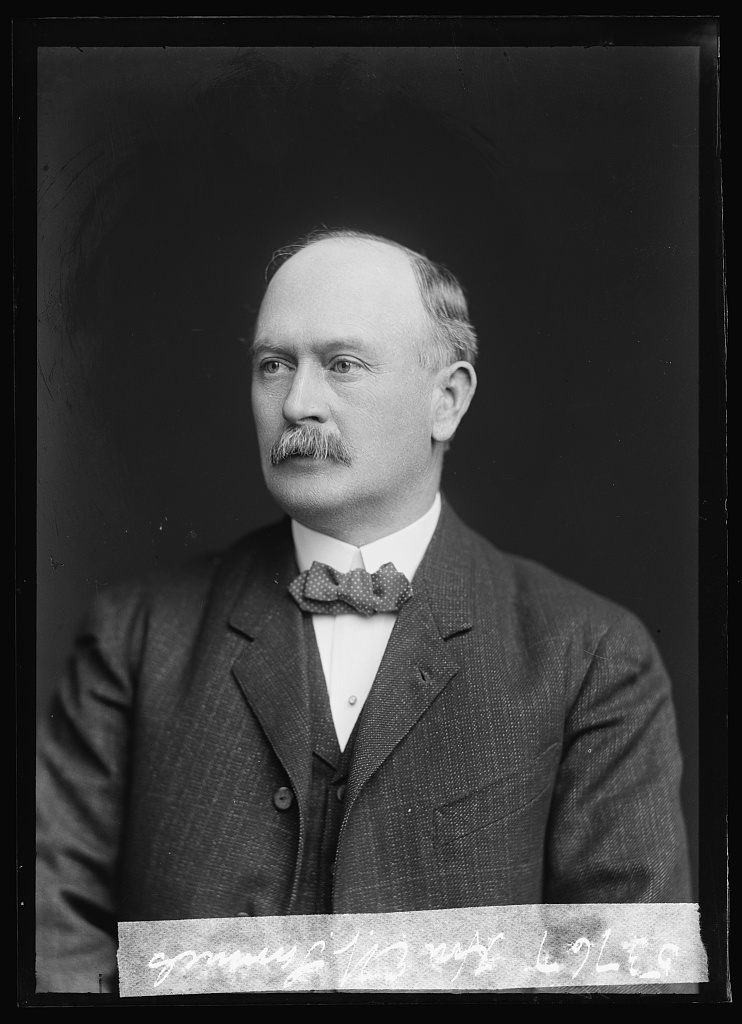
Edmund W. Samuel photographed by C. M. Bell Studio

Edmund William Samuel (November 27, 1857 – March 7, 1930) was a Republican member of the U.S. House of Representatives from Pennsylvania.

Edmund W. Samuel was born in Blaenavon, Wales. He immigrated to the United States with his parents, who settled in Ashland, Pennsylvania, in 1859. He was engaged in coal mining. He learned the drug business and began the study of medicine. He graduated from the Jefferson Medical College at Philadelphia in 1880 and commenced practice in Mount Carmel, Pennsylvania. He served as school director of Mount Carmel from 1890 to 1894.

Samuel was elected as a Republican to the Fifty-ninth Congress. He was an unsuccessful candidate for reelection in 1906 and for election in 1908. He resumed the practice of medicine in Mount Carmel and served as president and general manager of the Shamokin-Mount Carmel Transit Co. from 1908 to 1924. He retired in 1925 and moved to Brooklyn, New York. He died in Mount Carmel in 1930. He was buried in the Mount Carmel Cemetery.

== Sources ==
- United States Congress. "Edmund W. Samuel (id: S000027)". Biographical Directory of the United States Congress.
- The Political Graveyard

U.S. House of Representatives
Preceded by Charles H. Dickerman	Member of the U.S. House of Representatives from Pennsylvania's 16th congressional district 1905–1907	Succeeded by John G. McHenry
