= W. U. Hensel =

American journalist

William Uhler Hensel
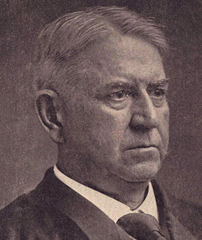

40th Attorney General of Pennsylvania
- In office January 10, 1891 – January 15, 1895
- Governor: Robert E. Pattison
- Preceded by: William Sebring Kirkpatrick
- Succeeded by: Henry Clay McCormick

Personal details
- Born: December 4, 1851 Quarryville, Lancaster County.
- Died: February 27, 1915 (aged 63) Savannah, Georgia
- Spouse: Emily Flinn
- Children: 1
- Education: Franklin & Marshall College

William Uhler Hensel (December 4, 1851 – February 27, 1915) was a Pennsylvania newspaper editor, lawyer, author, and state Attorney General. He was very active in politics, and a noted political speaker, but steadfastly declined any official post beyond his term as Attorney General.

Hensel authored several books, most notably biographies of Grover Cleveland and his running mates Thomas A. Hendricks and Allen G. Thurman.

== Personal life and career ==
Hensel was born the son of George Washington Hensel, a very successful businessman: president of the local bank, director of the local railroad, and trustee of Franklin and Marshall College, and Anna Maria Uhler.

Hensel attended Franklin and Marshall College and graduated in 1870.

Hensel had an early interest in politics, and in 1872 he canvassed for Charles R. Buckalew in his unsuccessful run for governorship.

Hensel was admitted to the bar in 1873.

In 1874, Hensel bought a half-interest in the Lancaster Intelligencer and became its editor. Under his direction, the paper went from the typical small-town litany of local trivia to the more big-town news-as-drama and political advocacy.

In 1875, Hensel became even more involved in local Democratic politics, being elected Chairman of the Democratic Committee of Lancaster County.

Hensel kept up his law practice, and when in 1880 the paper ran an editorial criticizing a judge, he and his co-owner were disbarred. On appeal to the state Supreme Court, with several prominent state lawyers, and fellow newspaperman and politician Alexander McClure defending him, they were unanimously readmitted.

In 1882 Hensel was elected President of the Pennsylvania State Editorial Association.

In 1886 Hensel sold his interest in the Intelligencer, and in 1887 opened a law office with J. Hay Brown that proved very successful.

In 1891, Governor Pattison appointed Hensel to Attorney General. Among other things, he tried to root out corruption within Pattison's cabinet, and prosecuted the state Attorney Auditor and state Secretary of the Treasurer.

In his later years he devoted himself strongly to local history and affairs. Hensel helped found the Lancaster County Historical Society.

In 1914, Hensel's health declined sharply and he retired from practice, and moved south for his health, finally dying in Savannah, Georgia.

== Books by Hensel ==
- The Christiana Riot and the Treason Trials of 1851: An Historical Sketch, 1911

Legal offices
Preceded by William Sebring Kirkpatrick	Pennsylvania Attorney General; 1891–1895	Succeeded by Henry Clay McCormick
