= Laird Howard Barber =

American lawyer, jurist and politician (1848–1928)

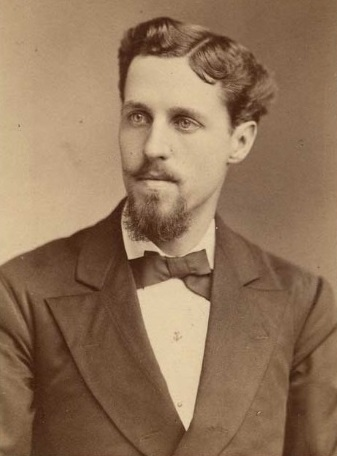

Member of the U.S. House of Representatives from Pennsylvania's 8th district
- In office March 4, 1899 – March 3, 1901
- Preceded by: William Sebring Kirkpatrick
- Succeeded by: Howard Mutchler

Personal details
- Born: October 25, 1848 Mifflinburg, Pennsylvania, U.S.
- Died: February 16, 1928 (aged 79)
- Party: Democratic

Laird Howard Barber (October 25, 1848 – February 16, 1928) was an American lawyer, jurist and politician who was a Democratic member of the U.S. House of Representatives from Pennsylvania, serving one term from 1899 to 1901.

== Life and career ==
Barber was born on a farm near Mifflinburg, Pennsylvania. He prepared for college in the Mifflinburg Academy, and graduated from Lafayette College in Easton, Pennsylvania, in 1871. He taught school at Mount Carmel, Pennsylvania and was principal of the Mauch Chunk Public Schools from 1875 to 1880.

He studied law, was admitted to the bar in Carbon County, Pennsylvania, in 1881, and commenced practice at Mauch Chunk. He was elected in 1890 a director of the Mauch Chunk School Board and served as president and treasurer, and also served as secretary of the town council.

=== Congress and judicial career ===
He was an unsuccessful candidate for election to the United States House of Representatives in 1896. Barber was elected as a Democrat to the Fifty-sixth Congress. He was not a candidate for renomination in 1900.

He resumed the practice of law in Mauch Chunk.

In 1913, he was elected president judge of the fifty-sixth judicial district of Pennsylvania. He was reelected in 1923 and served until his death in Mauch Chunk in 1928. He is interred in Evergreen Cemetery in East Mauch Chunk, Pennsylvania.

== Sources ==
- United States Congress. "Laird H. Barber (id: B000123)". Biographical Directory of the United States Congress.
- Laird Howard Barber at The Political Graveyard

U.S. House of Representatives
| Preceded by William Sebring Kirkpatrick | Member of the U.S. House of Representatives from Pennsylvania's 8th congressional district 1899 - 1901 | Succeeded by Howard Mutchler |
