= William Wallace Brown =

American politician (1836–1926)

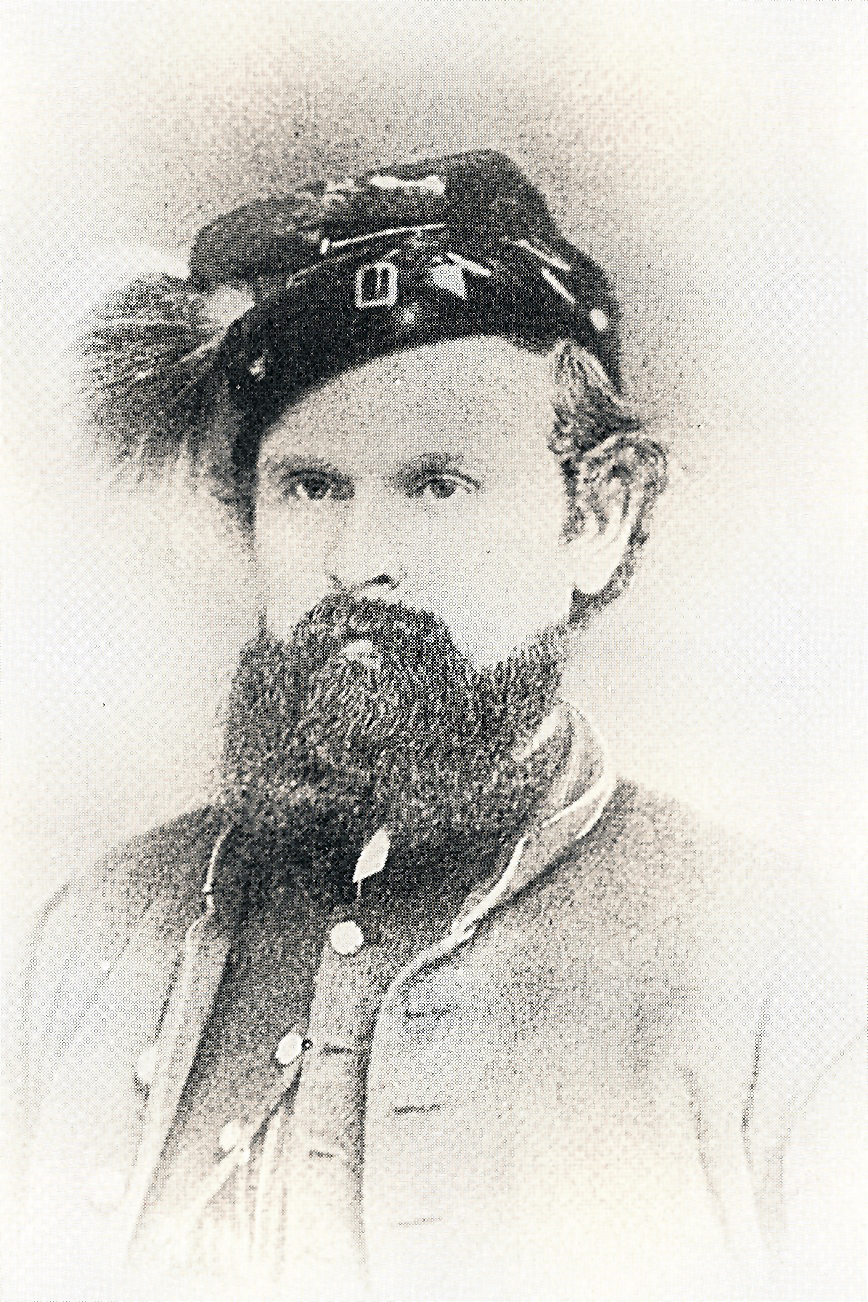

Member of the U.S. House of Representatives from Pennsylvania's 16th district
- In office March 4, 1883 – March 3, 1887
- Preceded by: Robert Jarvis Cochran Walker
- Succeeded by: Henry Clay McCormick

Member of the Pennsylvania House of Representatives
- In office 1872-1876

Personal details
- Born: April 22, 1836 Summerhill, New York
- Died: November 4, 1926 (aged 90) Bradford, Pennsylvania
- Party: Republican

William Wallace Brown (April 22, 1836 – November 4, 1926) was a Republican member of the U.S. House of Representatives from Pennsylvania.

== Biography ==
William W. Brown was born in Summerhill, New York. He moved with his parents to Elk County, Pennsylvania, in 1838. He attended the common schools and Smethport Academy. He graduated from Alfred University in Allegany County, New York, in 1861. He enlisted in the Twenty-third New York Volunteers in 1861, and transferred to the First Pennsylvania Rifles on December 18, 1861.

Brown was appointed recorder of deeds of McKean County, Pennsylvania, in 1864 and its superintendent of schools in 1866. He studied law, was admitted to the bar in 1866 and practiced. He was elected district attorney of McKean County the same year. In 1869 he moved to Corry, Pennsylvania, where he served three years as city attorney and two years in the city council. He was a member of the Pennsylvania House of Representatives from 1872 to 1876. He was appointed aide-de-camp to Governor John F. Hartranft in 1876 and was associated with the Pennsylvania National Guard. In 1878 he moved to Bradford, Pennsylvania, and continued the practice of law.

Brown was elected as a Republican to the Forty-eighth and Forty-ninth Congresses. He was an unsuccessful candidate for renomination in 1886. He resumed the practice of law, and served as city solicitor of Bradford from 1892 to 1897. He worked as auditor for the War Department from 1897 to 1899 and auditor for the Navy Department from 1899 to 1907. He was appointed Assistant Attorney General by President Theodore Roosevelt in 1907, and served until 1910. He was in charge of defense of Spanish treaty claims. He resumed the practice of law in Bradford where he died 1926. He was interred in Alfred Cemetery in Alfred, New York.

U.S. House of Representatives
Preceded by Robert Jarvis Cochran Walker	Member of the U.S. House of Representatives from Pennsylvania's 16th congressional district 1883-1887	Succeeded by Henry Clay McCormick
