= Joseph Marion Hackett =

American politician

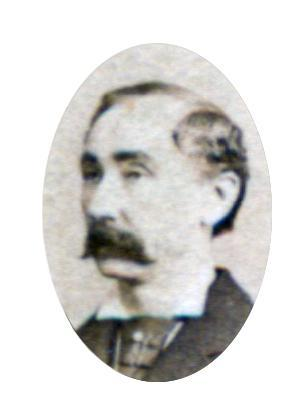

Member of the Pennsylvania House of Representatives for Northampton County
- In office 1879–1882

Personal details
- Born: March 31, 1831 Queen Anne's County, Maryland
- Died: November 9, 1912 (aged 81) Easton, Pennsylvania
- Resting place: Easton Cemetery
- Party: Democratic
- Spouse: Mary née Barnett
- Children: William Clayton Hackett

Joseph Marion Hackett was an American politician from Pennsylvania that served as a member of the Pennsylvania House of Representatives from 1879 to 1882 as a Democrat.

== Biography ==
Joseph Marion was born on March 31, 1831, in Queen Anne's County, Maryland before moving to Easton, Pennsylvania and becoming involved in the local mercantile trade. He became involved in local politics and was elected the President of the Easton city council from 1877 to 1878, after which he was elected to the Pennsylvania House of Representatives for two terms from 1879 to 1881 as a Democrat and chose to not stand for re-election to a third term. Instead he attempted to run for Pennsylvania State Treasurer twice, once in 1881 and again in 1883, both times unsuccessfully. In his later life he served on the board of several local institutions such as the State Hospital at Norristown, the Easton National Bank, the St. Lawrence Heat and Power Company, and was the founder of the Hackett clothing company. He died on November 9, 1912, and is buried in the Easton Cemetery.

== Personal life ==
Joseph was married to Mary née Barnett, and his son William Clayton Hackett would also pursue a career in politics, being elected to the Pennsylvania State Senate before unsuccessfully running for Lieutenant Governor of Pennsylvania.
