= Elias Deemer =

American politician

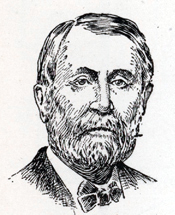

Member of the U.S. House of Representatives from Pennsylvania
- In office March 4, 1901 – March 3, 1907
- Preceded by: Horace B. Packer
- Succeeded by: William B. Wilson
- Constituency: 16th district (1901–1903); 15th district (1903–1907)

Personal details
- Born: January 3, 1838 Durham, Pennsylvania, US
- Died: March 29, 1918 (aged 80) Williamsport, Pennsylvania, US
- Party: Republican

Elias Deemer (January 3, 1838 – March 29, 1918) was a Republican member of the U.S. House of Representatives from Pennsylvania.

== Biography ==
Elias Deemer was born near Durham, Pennsylvania. He was engaged in the mercantile business in Lycoming County, Pennsylvania and in Philadelphia in 1860. During the Civil War, he enlisted in July 1861 as a private in Company E, One Hundred and Fourth Regiment, Pennsylvania Volunteers, and served until the middle of May 1862, when he was discharged because of disabilities. He moved to Milford, New Jersey, in 1862 and engaged in business. In 1868 moved to Williamsport, Pennsylvania, and engaged in the manufacture of lumber. He served as president of the common council from 1888 to 1890. He was president of the Williamsport National Bank from 1893 to 1918, and also interested in the publication of several newspapers at Williamsport. He was a delegate to the 1896 Republican National Convention.

Deemer was elected as a Republican to the Fifty-seventh, Fifty-eighth, and Fifty-ninth Congresses. He was an unsuccessful candidate for reelection in 1906, for election in 1908. He resumed lumber operations in Pennsylvania, and at Deemer, Mississippi, an unincorporated town he founded, and which was named for him. Deemer is just south of Philadelphia, Mississippi in Neshoba County.

He died at his home in Williamsport, Pennsylvania on March 29, 1918. Interment in Wildwood Cemetery.

== Sources ==
- United States Congress. "Elias Deemer (id: D000186)". Biographical Directory of the United States Congress.
- The Political Graveyard

U.S. House of Representatives
Preceded by Horace B. Packer	Member of the U.S. House of Representatives from Pennsylvania's 16th congressional district 1901–1903	Succeeded by Charles H. Dickerman
Preceded by Charles F. Wright	Member of the U.S. House of Representatives from Pennsylvania's 15th congressional district 1903–1907	Succeeded by William B. Wilson
