= Henry C. McCormick =

American politician

Henry Clay McCormick
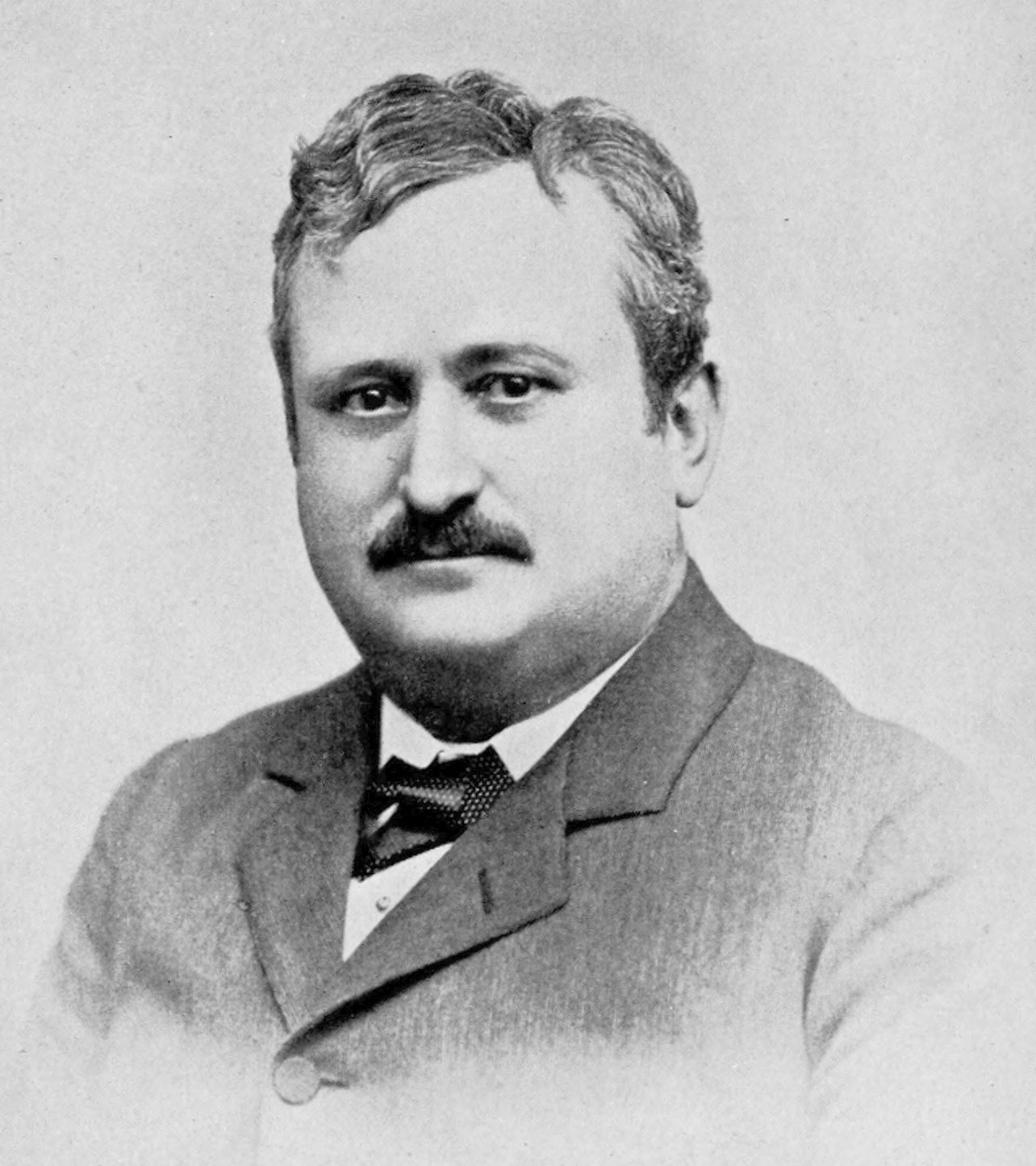

Member of the U.S. House of Representatives from Pennsylvania's 16th congressional district
- In office March 4, 1887 – March 3, 1891
- Preceded by: William W. Brown
- Succeeded by: Albert C. Hopkins

41st Attorney General of Pennsylvania
- In office January 15, 1895 – January 18, 1899
- Governor: Daniel H. Hastings
- Preceded by: W. U. Hensel
- Succeeded by: John P. Elkin

Personal details
- Born: June 30, 1844 Washington Township.
- Died: May 26, 1902 (aged 57) Williamsport
- Party: Republican
- Spouse: Ida Hays
- Children: 2

Henry Clay McCormick (June 30, 1844 – May 26, 1902) was a Republican member of the U.S. House of Representatives from Pennsylvania.

== Formative years ==
Henry C. McCormick was born in Washington Township, Lycoming County, Pennsylvania on June 30, 1844. He attended the common schools and Dickinson Seminary in Williamsport, Pennsylvania. He studied law, was admitted to the bar in 1866 and practiced in Williamsport.

== Career ==
McCormick was elected as a Republican to the Fiftieth and Fifty-first Congresses. He served as chairman of the United States House Committee on Railways and Canals during the Fifty-first Congress. He was a delegate to the 1892 Republican National Convention. He was elected president of the Williamsport & North Branch Railroad in 1892. He served as Attorney General of Pennsylvania from 1895 to 1899. He resumed the practice of law.

== Death and interment ==
McCormick died in Williamsport in 1902. His body was interred at the Wildwood Cemetery.

== Sources ==
- United States Congress. "Henry C. McCormick (id: M000366)". Biographical Directory of the United States Congress.
- The Political Graveyard

U.S. House of Representatives
Preceded by William W. Brown	Member of the U.S. House of Representatives from Pennsylvania's 16th congressional district 1887-1891	Succeeded by Albert C. Hopkins
Legal offices
Preceded by W. U. Hensel	Pennsylvania Attorney General; 1895–1899	Succeeded by John P. Elkin
