= General Cassidy =

General Cassidy may refer to:

- Duane H. Cassidy (1933–2016), U.S. Air Force general
- Patrick F. Cassidy (1915–1990), U.S. Army lieutenant general
- William F. Cassidy (1908–2002), U.S. Army lieutenant general

== See also ==
- Attorney General Cassidy (disambiguation)
