= Harry D. Kutz =

American politician

Member of the Pennsylvania Senate from the 18th district
- In office 1923–1926
- Preceded by: William Clayton Hackett
- Succeeded by: Warren R. Roberts

Personal details
- Born: July 6, 1873 Kutztown, Pennsylvania
- Died: August 31, 1934 (aged 61)
- Party: Democratic
- Spouse: Carrie Odenwelder
- Education: Keystone State Normal School; Lafayette College
- Occupation: Lawyer

Harry D. Kutz (1873 - 1934) was an American politician from Pennsylvania who served in the Pennsylvania State Senate, representing the 18th district from 1923 to 1926 as a Democrat.

Kutz was born in Kutztown, Pennsylvania on July 6, 1873. He attended the Keystone State Normal School and Lafayette College. He was admitted to the bar in 1900. He read law with Frank Reeder, the Assistant Chief of the National Security League, as well as the Assistant District Attorney of Northampton County. He was elected to the State Senate for one term from 1923 to 1926, He married Carrie Née Odenwelder, and died on August 31, 1934.
