= Robert Jarvis Cochran Walker =

American politician (1838–1903)

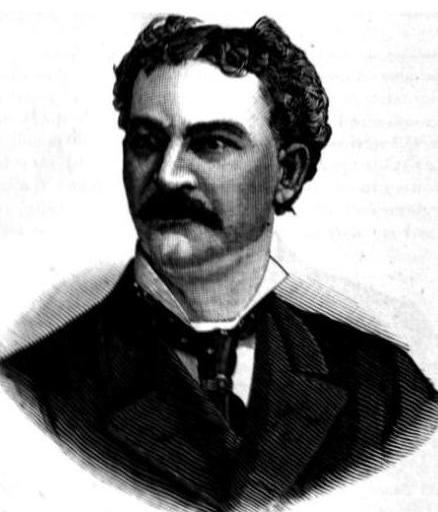

Robert Jarvis Cochran Walker (October 20, 1838 – December 19, 1903) was a Republican member of the U.S. House of Representatives from Pennsylvania.

== Formative years ==
Robert Jarvis Cochran Walker was born near West Chester, Pennsylvania on October 20, 1838. He attended school at East Hampton, Massachusetts, and Cambridge, Massachusetts. He graduated from the law department of Harvard University in 1858, was admitted to the bar in 1859 and commenced practice in Philadelphia.

== Political and business career ==
Walker served as director of the first school district of Pennsylvania, and was twice elected to the council of Philadelphia. He purchased the Saturday Evening Post in 1874 and was its editor for a short time.

He was engaged in the production of oil; in 1875, he moved to Williamsport, Pennsylvania, where he engaged in land, lumber and coal developments.

Walker was elected as a Republican to the Forty-seventh Congress. He declined to be a candidate for renomination in 1882 but his name was presented by his friends.

He returned to Philadelphia in 1890 and became a manufacturing chemist.

== Death and interment ==
Walker died in Philadelphia in 1903, and was interred in the Laurel Hill Cemetery.

== Sources ==
- United States Congress. "Robert Jarvis Cochran Walker (id: W000066)". Biographical Directory of the United States Congress.
- The Political Graveyard

U.S. House of Representatives
Preceded by John I. Mitchell	Member of the U.S. House of Representatives from Pennsylvania's 16th congressional district 1881-1883	Succeeded by William W. Brown
