= Albert C. Hopkins =

American politician

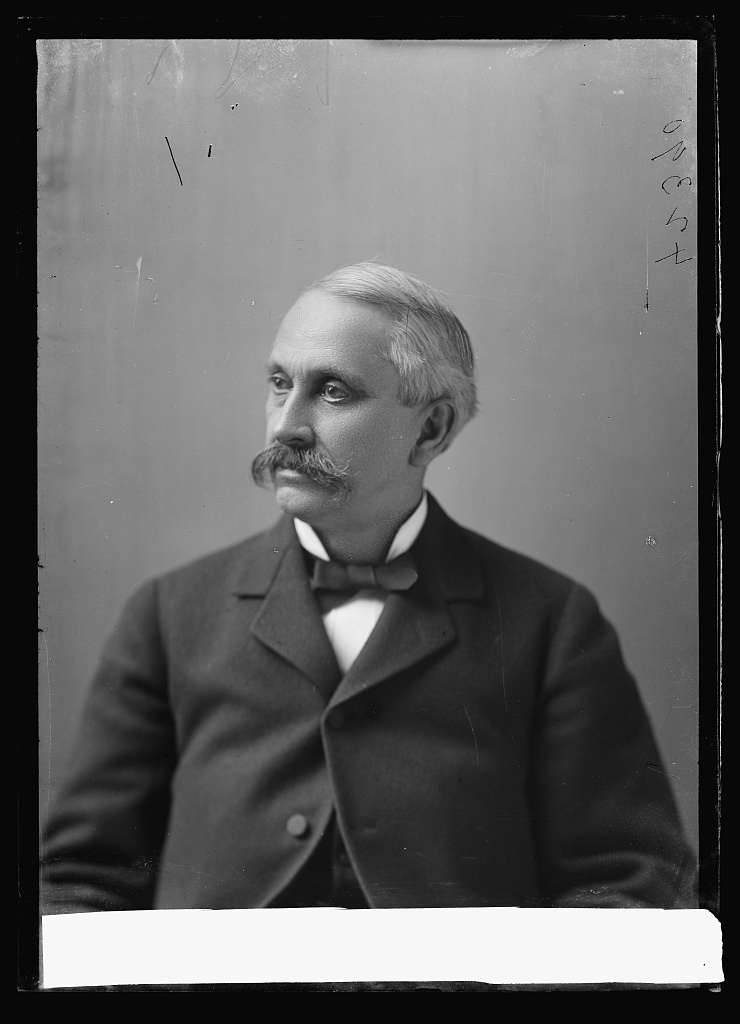
- Hopkins, photographed by C. M. Bell

Member of the U.S. House of Representatives from Pennsylvania's 16th district
- In office March 4, 1891 – March 3, 1895
- Preceded by: Henry Clay McCormick
- Succeeded by: Fred Churchill Leonard

Personal details
- Born: September 15, 1837 Villenova, New York
- Died: June 9, 1911 (aged 73) Lock Haven, Pennsylvania
- Party: Republican
- Education: Alfred University

Albert Cole Hopkins (September 15, 1837 – June 9, 1911) was a Republican member of the U.S. House of Representatives from Pennsylvania.

== Biography ==
Born in Villenova, New York, Hopkins graduated from Alfred University in Alfred, New York. He taught school, and engaged in mercantile pursuits in Troy, Pennsylvania. In 1867, he moved to Lock Haven, Pennsylvania, where he engaged in the lumber business.

Hopkins was elected as a Republican to the Fifty-second and Fifty-third Congresses. He was not a candidate for renomination in 1894.

He resumed his lumber manufacturing pursuits. Appointed as the state forestry commissioner from 1899 to 1904, Hopkins also served as a delegate to the 1900 and 1904 Republican National Conventions.

== Death ==
Hopkins died in Lock Haven, Pennsylvania, in 1911, and was interred in the Highland Cemetery.

U.S. House of Representatives
Preceded by Henry C. McCormick	Member of the U.S. House of Representatives from Pennsylvania's 16th congressional district 1891-1895	Succeeded by Fred C. Leonard
