= William Sebring Kirkpatrick =

American politician (1844–1932)

Member of the U.S. House of Representatives from Pennsylvania's 8th district
- In office March 4, 1897 – March 3, 1899
- Preceded by: Joseph Johnson Hart
- Succeeded by: Laird Howard Barber

Attorney General of Pennsylvania
- In office January 18, 1887 – January 10, 1891
- Governor: James A. Beaver
- Preceded by: Lewis C. Cassidy
- Succeeded by: W. U. Hensel

Personal details
- Born: April 21, 1844 Easton, Pennsylvania, U.S.
- Died: November 3, 1932 (aged 88) Easton, Pennsylvania, U.S.
- Resting place: Easton Cemetery
- Party: Republican
- Spouse: Elizabeth H. Jones
- Children: 2
- Education: Lafayette College

William Sebring Kirkpatrick (April 21, 1844 – November 3, 1932) was a Republican member of the U.S. House of Representatives from Pennsylvania.

William S. Kirkpatrick (father of William Huntington Kirkpatrick) was born in Easton, Pennsylvania. He attended the public schools and Lafayette College in Easton. He studied law, was admitted to the bar, and commenced practice in Easton. He was the solicitor of Easton from 1866 to 1874. He worked as a teacher in the Easton public schools in 1868 and 1869. He was appointed president judge of the third judicial district in 1874, and served as a member of the faculty of Lafayette College from 1875 to 1877 and member of the board of trustees from 1890 to 1932. He presided temporarily over the Republican State convention in 1882. He was a delegate to the 1884 Republican National Convention. He was Attorney General of Pennsylvania from 1887 to 1891. He served as lecturer on municipal law at Lafayette College.

Kirkpatrick was an unsuccessful candidate for election in 1894. He was elected as a Republican to the Fifty-fifth Congress. He was an unsuccessful candidate for reelection in 1898. For a year from 1902 to 1903 he served as the acting president at Lafayette while president Ethelbert Dudley Warfield recuperated in Europe. He resumed the practice of law and died in Easton, in 1932. Interment in Easton Cemetery.

== Sources ==
- United States Congress. "William Sebring Kirkpatrick (id: K000241)". Biographical Directory of the United States Congress.
- The Political Graveyard
- Jordan, John W. (1914). Encyclopedia of Pennsylvania Biography: Illustrated. Vol. 1. Lewis Historical Publishing Company.
- Heller, William J. (1920). History of Northampton County and the Grand Valley of the Lehigh. Vol. 2. Boston: American Historical Society.

U.S. House of Representatives
Preceded by Joseph Johnson Hart	Member of the U.S. House of Representatives from Pennsylvania's 8th congressional district 1897-1899	Succeeded by Laird Howard Barber
Legal offices
Preceded by Lewis C. Cassidy	Attorney General of Pennsylvania; 1887–1891	Succeeded by W. U. Hensel
