= Fred C. Leonard =

American politician

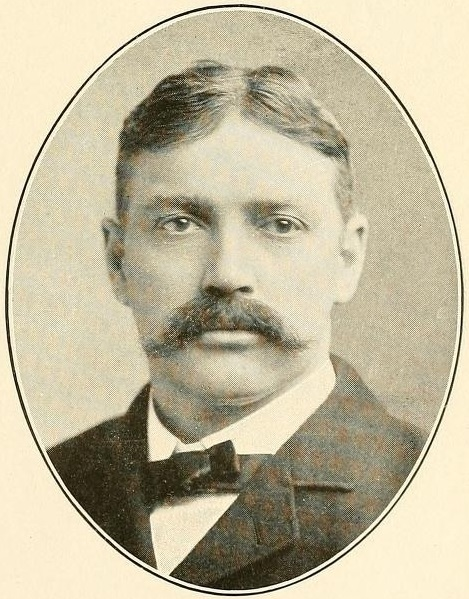
- From 1901's Notable Men of Pittsburgh and Vicinity

United States Marshal for the Middle District of Pennsylvania
- In office May 6, 1901 – July 2, 1906
- Preceded by: None (newly created district)
- Succeeded by: Charles B. Witmer

United States Marshal for the Western District of Pennsylvania
- In office January 15, 1898 – May 6, 1901
- Preceded by: John W. Walker
- Succeeded by: Stephen P. Stone

Member of the U.S. House of Representatives from Pennsylvania's 16th district
- In office March 4, 1895 – March 3, 1897
- Preceded by: Albert Cole Hopkins
- Succeeded by: Horace Billings Packer

Personal details
- Born: February 16, 1856 Elmer, Pennsylvania, U.S.
- Died: December 5, 1921 (aged 65) Coudersport, Pennsylvania, U.S.
- Resting place: Eulalia Cemetery, Coudersport, Pennsylvania, U.S.
- Party: Republican
- Spouse: Estella Gertrude Cook (m. 1884)
- Children: 4
- Education: Mansfield University of Pennsylvania; Williston Seminary; Yale College
- Profession: Lawyer

Fred C. Leonard (February 16, 1856 – December 5, 1921) was a Republican member of the U.S. House of Representatives from Pennsylvania.

== Early life ==
Frederick Churchill Leonard was born in Elmer, Pennsylvania on February 16, 1856, the son of Walter and Dorcas (Churchill) Leonard. He attended the public schools of Potter County, Pennsylvania and Allegany County, New York. Leonard attended the State Normal School at Mansfield, Pennsylvania; he graduated in 1874, studied at Mansfield for another year, then taught there for two years. He went on to attend Williston Seminary in Easthampton, Massachusetts in preparation for attending college. Leonard graduated from Yale College in 1883. While there, he became a member of Scroll and Key and Delta Kappa Epsilon.

=== Family ===
In July 1884, Leonard married Estella Gertrude Cook; they were married until his death and were the parents of four children. Daughters Louise (1907), Shirley (1910), and Marjorie (1919) were all graduates of Vassar College. Son Walter graduated from Yale in 1916.

== Early career ==
Leonard studied law with the firm of Mortimer Fitzland Elliott and Francis E. Watrous in Wellsboro, Pennsylvania, then moved to Elmira, New York. In Elmira, he continued to study law with the firm of Corell & White until attaining admission to the bar in 1887. After his clerkship, he moved to Coudersport, Pennsylvania, where he began a law practice. Leonard was active in politics as a Republican and served as both chairman of the party in Potter County and a member of the party's state committee.

In 1894, Leonard was elected as a Republican to the Fifty-fourth Congress. He served one term, March 4, 1895 to March 3, 1897. Leonard was an unsuccessful candidate for renomination in 1896 and resumed the practice of law in Coudersport.

In 1898, Leonard was appointed United States Marshal for the Western District of Pennsylvania. He served from January 15, 1898 to May 6, 1901, when he was transferred to the Middle District. He served as the Middle District's marshal until July 2, 1906.

== Later career ==
In addition to practicing law, Leonard was engaged in banking and business. His ventures included serving as president of the First National Bank of Coudersport, president of the Octo Oil Company, and a director of the First National Bank of Independence, Kansas. He was also a director of the Kerr Turbine Company of Wellsville, New York and the Ackerly, Leonard & Rouse Oil Company of Bowling Green, Ohio. In addition, he was president of the Tennessee Mountain Coal & Land Company, a venture that acquired land for mineral and timber development.

During World War I, Leonard was chairman of Potter County's United War Work campaign and a member of the county's Liberty Loan committee. Leonard died in Coudersport on December 5, 1921. He was buried at Eulalia Cemetery in Coudersport.

U.S. House of Representatives
Preceded by Albert Cole Hopkins	Member of the U.S. House of Representatives from Pennsylvania's 16th congressional district 1895-1897	Succeeded by Horace Billings Packer
