= Horace B. Packer =

American politician

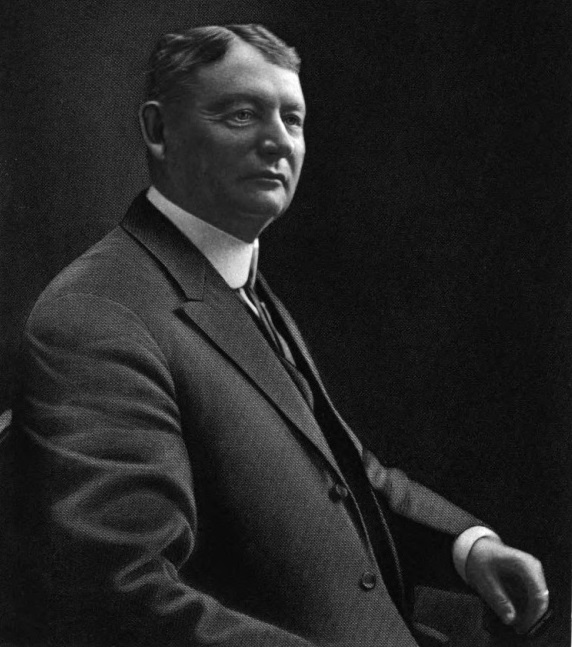
From Volume II of 1913's Genealogical and Personal History of Northern Pennsylvania

Horace Billings Packer (October 11, 1851 – April 13, 1940) was a Republican member of the U.S. House of Representatives from Pennsylvania.

== Formative years ==
Horace B. Packer was born in Wellsboro, Pennsylvania on October 11, 1851. He attended the common schools, the Wellsboro Academy, and Alfred University in Alfred, New York.

== Career ==
Packer studied law, and was admitted to the bar of Tioga County, Pennsylvania, in 1873 and commenced practice in Wellsboro. He was also engaged in the real estate business.

District attorney of Tioga County from 1875 to 1879, Packer was then elected to the Pennsylvania State House of Representatives in 1884 and reelected in 1886. He was a member of the Pennsylvania State Senate from 1888 to 1892. He also served for many years as a member of the borough council, and presided over the Republican State conventions of 1893 and 1894.

Packer was elected as a Republican to the Fifty-fifth and Fifty-sixth Congresses. He was not a candidate for renomination in 1900.

He resumed the practice of law in Wellsboro, and was also engaged in the real estate, banking, and lumber businesses. He was a delegate to the 1924 Republican National Convention.

== Death and interment ==
Packer died in Wellsboro in 1940, and was interred at the Wellsboro Cemetery.

== Sources ==
- United States Congress. "Horace B. Packer (id: P000007)". Biographical Directory of the United States Congress.
- The Political Graveyard

U.S. House of Representatives
Preceded by Fred C. Leonard	Member of the U.S. House of Representatives from Pennsylvania's 16th congressional district 1897 - 1901	Succeeded by Elias Deemer
