= Howard Mutchler =

American journalist

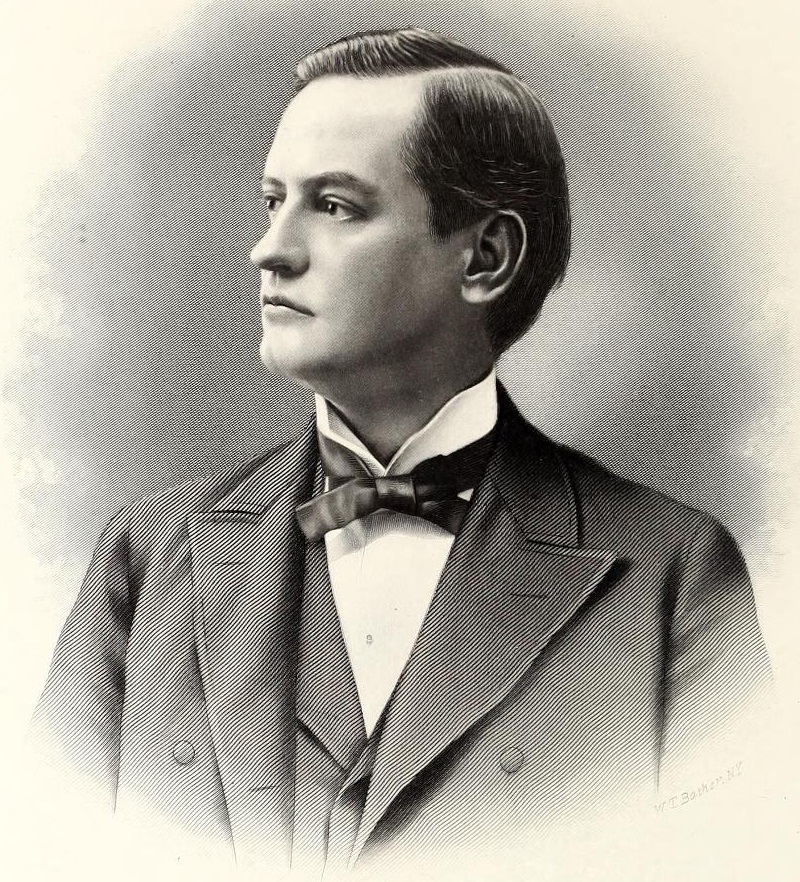

Member of the U.S. House of Representatives from Pennsylvania's 8th district
- In office March 4, 1901 – March 3, 1903
- Preceded by: Laird Howard Barber
- Succeeded by: Irving Price Wanger
- In office August 7, 1893 – March 3, 1895
- Preceded by: William Mutchler
- Succeeded by: Joseph Johnson Hart

Personal details
- Born: February 12, 1859 Easton, Pennsylvania, U.S.
- Died: January 4, 1916 (aged 56) Easton, Pennsylvania
- Party: Democratic
- Parent: William Mutchler

Howard Mutchler (February 12, 1859 – January 4, 1916) was a Democratic member of the U.S. House of Representatives from Pennsylvania. Howard Mutchler (son of William Mutchler), was born in Easton, Pennsylvania. He attended the public schools of Easton and Phillips Academy in Andover, Massachusetts. He studied law with his father, but before qualifying for admission to the bar he decided on a newspaper career, and became editor and publisher of the Easton Daily Express and the Northampton Democrat. He was also active in several businesses, including serving as president of the Easton Telephone Company and the United States Long Distance Telephone Company, and a member of the board of directors of the Easton and Nazareth Transit Company.

His wife was a native of Easton. She was educated at St. Mary's Hall in Burlington, New Jersey; they first met in Easton.

Mutchler was elected as a Democrat to the Fifty-third Congress to fill the vacancy caused by the death of his father, William Mutchler. He served from August 7, 1893 to March 3, 1895, and was not a candidate for reelection in 1894.

He was elected to the Fifty-seventh Congress in 1900, and served from March 4, 1901 to March 3, 1903. He resumed his newspaper activities, and died in Easton in 1916. He was interred in Easton Cemetery.

== Sources ==
- United States Congress. "Howard Mutchler (id: M001124)". Biographical Directory of the United States Congress.
- Howard Mutchler at The Political Graveyard

U.S. House of Representatives
Preceded by William Mutchler	Member of the U.S. House of Representatives from Pennsylvania's 8th congressional district 1893-1895	Succeeded by Joseph Johnson Hart
Preceded by Laird Howard Barber	Member of the U.S. House of Representatives from Pennsylvania's 8th congressional district 1901-1903	Succeeded by Irving Price Wanger
