= William Clayton Hackett =

American politician

- Portrait of Hackett in 1920

Member of the Pennsylvania Senate from the 18th district
- In office 1915–1922
- Preceded by: Harry J. Morgan
- Succeeded by: Harry D. Kutz

Personal details
- Born: May 5, 1874 Easton, Pennsylvania, U.S.
- Died: December 10, 1930 (aged 56)
- Party: Democratic
- Spouse: Bessie Marlin Cooley
- Children: 1
- Parent: Joseph Marion Hackett
- Education: Lafayette College; New York University

William Clayton Hackett (May 5, 1874 – December 10, 1930) was an American politician from Pennsylvania who served in the Pennsylvania State Senate, representing the 18th district from 1915 to 1922 as a Democrat.

== Biography ==
William was born to Joseph Marion Hackett and Mary Née Barnett on April 25, 1874, in Easton, Pennsylvania. His father was Democrat member of the Pennsylvania House of Representatives from 1879 to 1882. William attended both public and private high schools before receiving a college degree from Lafayette College, and going on to study at New York University. He worked as a Metallurgist for the Stewart Wire Company for ten years before moving to New Mexico for a year. Upon his return he operated the Hackett Clothing Company.

Hackett was elected to the Pennsylvania State Senate as a Democrat in 1914, starting his term in 1915. During his term he was a member on the committees for Appropriations, Finance, Game and Fisheries, Law and Order, Legislative Apportionment, Military Affairs, Mines and Mining, Public Printing, and Railroads. He also served as a delegate to the 1924 Democratic National Convention and launched an unsuccessful bid for Lieutenant Governor of Pennsylvania in 1926.

== Personal life ==
Hackett was a member of several local clubs and boards. including as Director and President of the Easton National Bank, serving on the Board of Prison Inspectors for Northampton County, and being a trustee for the State Hospital for the Insane for five years. He was also appointed a member of the Washington Crossing Park Commission by governor William Cameron Sproul.

Hackett married Bessie Marlin Née Cooley in 1907. The couple had one child, a daughter Ann Hackett Gerhardt. William died on December 10, 1930, at the age of 56 and is buried at the Hackett family plot in the Easton Cemetery.
