= Lewis C. Cassidy =

American lawyer and politician (1829–1889)

- 1874 engraving

Attorney General of Pennsylvania
- In office January 17, 1883 – January 18, 1887
- Governor: Robert E. Pattison
- Preceded by: Henry W. Palmer
- Succeeded by: William S. Kirkpatrick

Personal details
- Born: Lewis Cochran Cassidy; October 17, 1829; New York City, New York, U.S.
- Died: November 18, 1889 (aged 60); Germantown, Philadelphia, Pennsylvania, U.S.
- Resting place: Laurel Hill Cemetery, Philadelphia, Pennsylvania, U.S.
- Political party: Democratic
- Spouse: Sallie Truman
- Children: 3

Lewis Cochran Cassidy (October 17, 1829 – November 18, 1889) was an American lawyer and politician from Pennsylvania who served as Attorney General of Pennsylvania from 1883 to 1887.

== Life and career ==
Cassidy was born in New York City, the child of Irish immigrants. The family moved to Philadelphia shortly afterwards. His father died when he was ten.

Cassidy attended Central High. Upon graduating, he studied law in the offices of Benjamin H. Brewster, and was admitted to the bar in 1849. He was immediately successful, and proved popular with the Moyamensing Hose Company, (Note: After the 1844 riots, the local fire companies typically allied with ethnic street gangs and corrupted local politics (Wilson & Coval (n.d.))) and was elected to the state House for the 1851 term. In 1852, Cassidy was elected Solicitor for the District of Moyamensing. By 1856, Cassidy was already considered a local political boss, and his influence helped elect Richard Vaux city mayor. He himself ran for District Attorney against William B. Mann, originally winning and inducted into office, but later losing after a judge ruled for Mann.

During the Civil War and afterwards, he was a staunch supporter of Union and federal coercion. He became a local leader of Democratic party politics. His support helped Robert E. Pattison become Governor—the state's only Democratic governor between the Civil War and the Great Depression—and Pattison in turn appointed Cassidy state Attorney General.

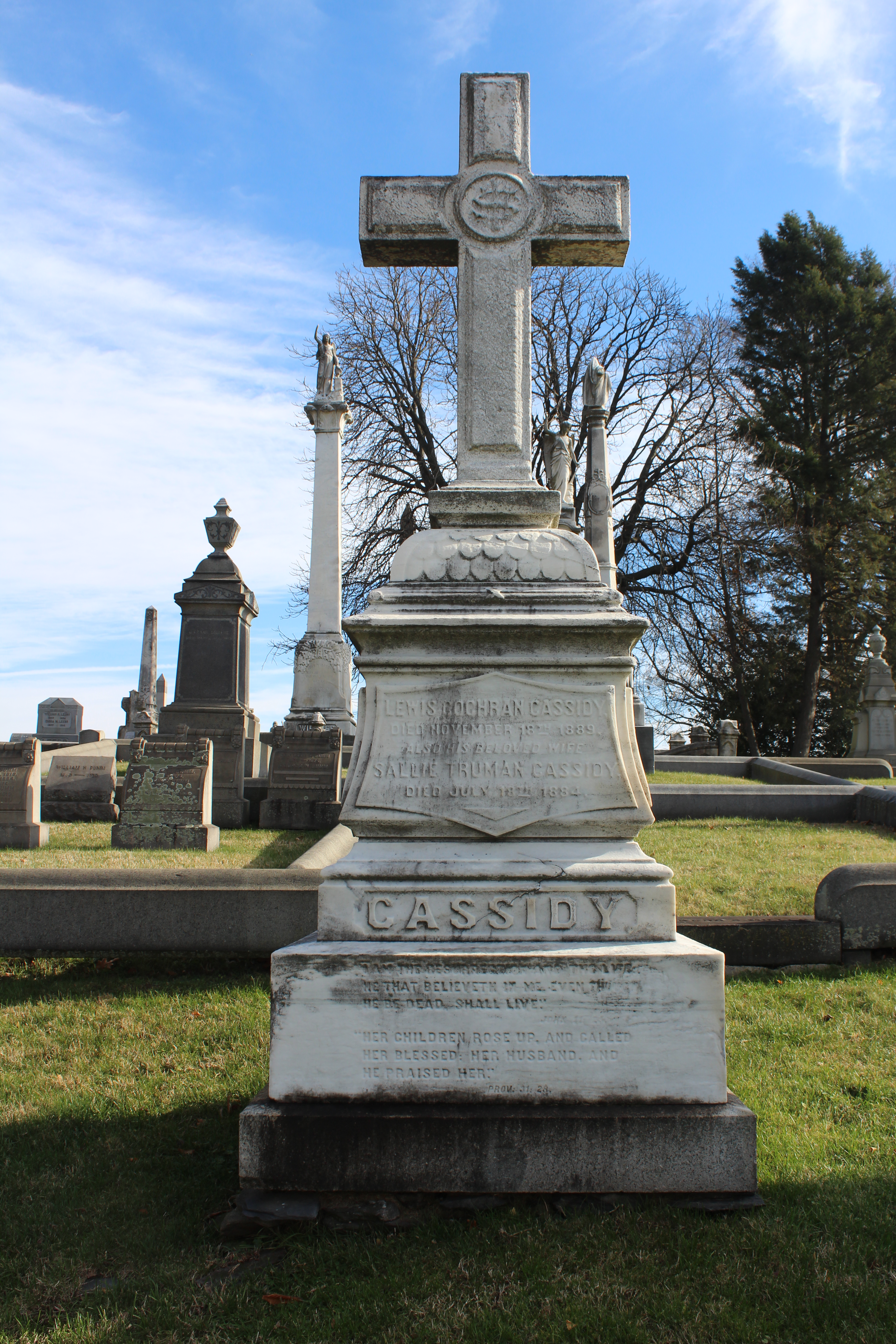
Lewis C. Cassidy tombstone in Laurel Hill Cemetery, Philadelphia

Cassidy's wife died in the last year of his term. At the completion of his term, Cassidy returned to private practice. He died in 1889, and was buried in Laurel Hill Cemetery.

== Legacy ==
The Lewis C. Cassidy School in Philadelphia was named after him. Singer Eva Cassidy is his 2nd great-granddaughter.

== Citations ==
Legal offices
Preceded by Henry W. Palmer	Pennsylvania Attorney General; 1883–1887	Succeeded by William S. Kirkpatrick
