= Harford, Pennsylvania =

Unincorporated community in Pennsylvania, US

Harford
- Unincorporated community
- Location within the state of Pennsylvania Harford (the United States)
- Coordinates: 41°46′56″N 75°42′06″W
- Country: United States
- State: Pennsylvania
- County: Susquehanna
- Township: Harford Township
- Elevation: 1,273 ft (388 m)

Population
  - Estimate (2023): 92
- Time zone: UTC-5 (Eastern (EST))
  - Summer (DST): UTC-4 (EDT)
- ZIP codes: 18823
- Area code: 570
- GNIS feature ID: 1176524

Harford is an unincorporated community located in Harford Township, Susquehanna County, Pennsylvania, United States.

== Demographics ==
Historical population
Census	Pop.	Note	%±
2023 (est.)	92

The United States Census Bureau defined Harford as a census designated place (CDP) in 2023.
