= John Dunbar (missionary) =

American missionary (1804–1857)

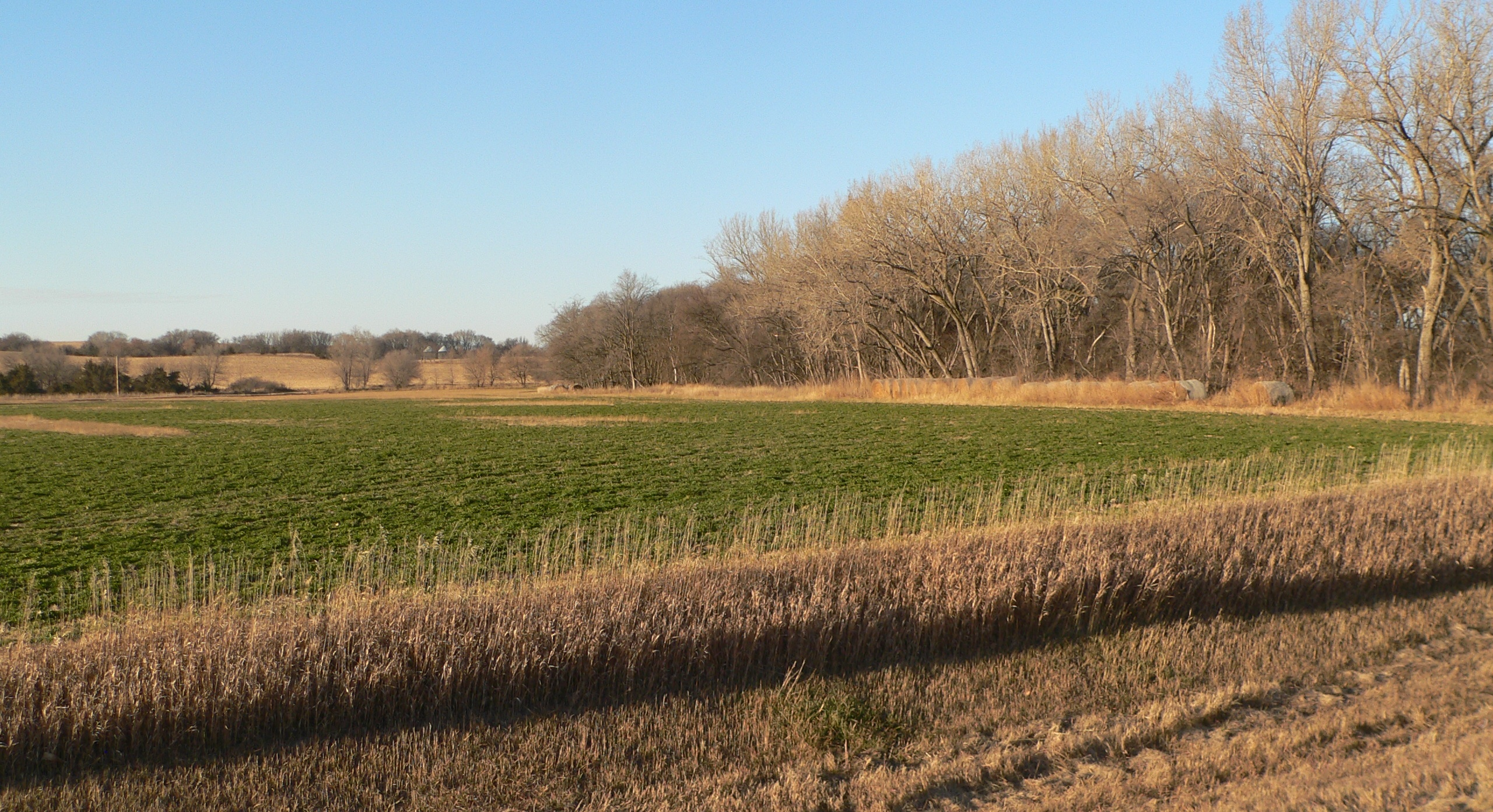
While nothing standing remains, the Pawnee Mission was located right here, next to modern-day Council Creek.

John Dunbar (1804–1857) was a missionary who tried to Christianize the Pawnee Indians of Nebraska during the 1830s–1840s.

== Early life ==
Born in Palmer, Massachusetts, John Dunbar grew up in the fertile cultural soil of western New England. The Connecticut River Valley was a region awash with revivalistic evangelical religion and the zeal for social reform, much as the more well-known Burned-over district of Western New York. Dunbar grew up in the shadow of missionary endeavor. He attended Williams College, where the 1806 Haystack Prayer Meeting took place, the birthplace of the American Board of Commissioners for Foreign Missions and the symbolic origin of the entire antebellum missionary movement.

== Heading West ==
Dunbar continued his education at Andover Theological Seminary, even as he began considering the cause of missions. He graduated and was ordained as a Presbyterian minister in 1834 and left for the western frontier that same year under the authority of the American Board of Commissioners for Foreign Missions. He was joined on the journey by Samuel Parker and an assistant missionary, Samuel Allis. Their original aim had been to go farther West and minister to the Confederated Salish and Kootenai Tribes, known at the time as the Flatheads. In St. Louis, the missionaries changed their minds, and Parker headed back to New England, though he would go on to fame as a missionary to Oregon.

== The Pawnee Mission ==
Instead, Dunbar and Allis decided to apply their evangelistic efforts more locally and instead made a base camp in Bellevue, Nebraska, where Moses Merrill, a Baptist missionary, was already at work amongst the Otoe–Missouria Indians. Over the next two years, Dunbar and Allis joined the Pawnee Indians bands on their biannual buffalo hunts across the Nebraskan Great Plains. Dunbar returned to Massachusetts to marry Esther Smith whose sister had died in the mission field at the Bombay Mission in modern-day Mumbai. Allis and the Dunbars continued to work sporadically with the Pawnees from Bellevue until 1841, when the missionaries built their own lodgings not far from the Pawnees' main village nearby modern-day Fullerton, Nebraska, in rural Nance County. A small settlement of white settlers developed around the mission, as treaty-appointed blacksmiths, teachers and farmers arrived to assist the Pawnee on the federal dime. Factionalism soon divided the American settlement, based in part upon disagreements about how to resolve Pawnee-white disputes. Dunbar and Allis largely supported the Pawnees' perspectives during these disagreements, worsening the factionalism but allowing the missionaries to maintain warm relations with the Pawnees. Nonetheless, none of the Pawnees were particularly drawn to the Christian message. Dunbar's efforts had come up empty and the growing threat of Lakota raids in the region forced the missionaries to flee the mission in 1846.

== Later life ==
Their mission work at an end, the Dunbars moved first to Andrew County and then Holt County, Missouri. They moved again in 1856 to Brown County, Kansas, where John Dunbar died the next year.

== Dances with Wolves ==
Interestingly, the acclaimed 1990 Western film Dances with Wolves starred Kevin Costner as a fictional character named Lt. John Dunbar. This fictional Dunbar supported the Indian cause against white rapacity and witnessed Pawnee and Lakota wars, much as the real Dunbar did. And, as it happens, John Dunbar's son, John Brown Dunbar, did fight in the Civil War. However, the name was not chosen for historical reasons. Michael Blake, the screenwriter, explained that he invented his main character by splicing together various period names from a list of men who served in the American Civil War. Blake was cheered by this happenstance: "In a mystical sort of way, I feel sort of vindicated that there was a John Dunbar out there."
