= Haystack Prayer Meeting =

1806 meeting in Williamstown, Massachusetts, US

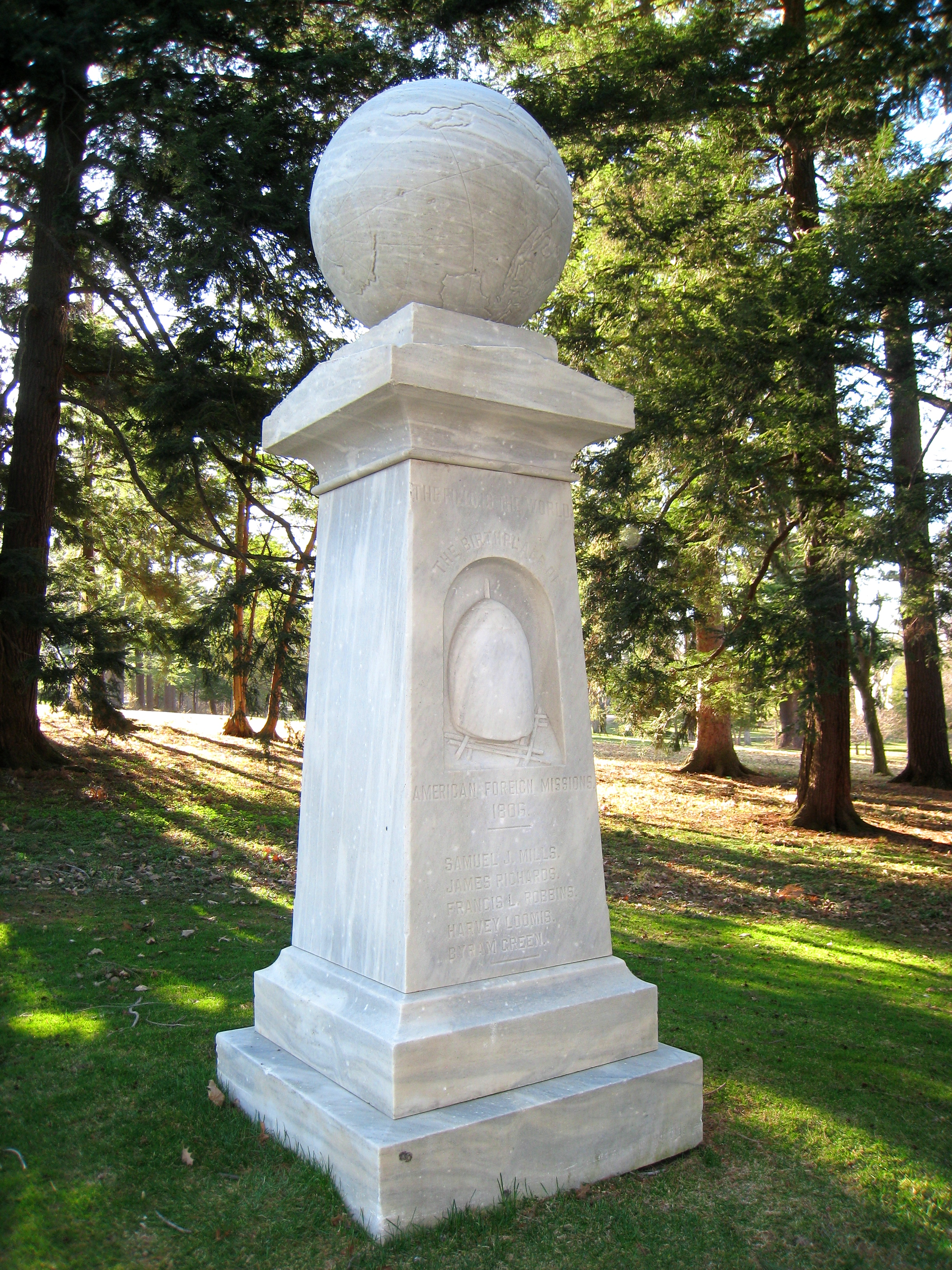
Haystack Monument, Williams College, 1806.

The Haystack Prayer Meeting, held in Williamstown, Massachusetts, in August 1806, is viewed by many scholars as the seminal event for the development of American Protestant missions in the subsequent decades and century. Missions are still supported today by American churches.

Five Williams College students gathered in a field to discuss the spiritual welfare of the people of Asia. Within four years of that gathering, some of its members established the American Board of Commissioners for Foreign Missions (ABCFM). In 1812 the ABCFM sent its first missionaries to India. During the 19th century, it sent missionaries to China, Hawaii, and other nations in southeast Asia, establishing hospitals and schools at its mission stations. Many of its missionaries undertook translation of the Bible into native languages. Thousands of missionaries were sent to Asia, and they taught numerous indigenous peoples.

Mission work has continued, with evolving purpose. In 1906, the ABCFM held a centennial commemoration. Groups considered to be spiritual heirs of the HPM include Global Ministries of the United Church of Christ and Christian Church (Disciples of Christ), InterVarsity Christian Fellowship, Student Volunteer Movement-2 (SVM-2), and Luke18 Project. More celebrations were held in 2006, at bicentennial events.

== History ==
In the summer of 1806, Williams College students Samuel Mills, James Richards, Francis LeBaron Robbins, Harvey Loomis, and Byram Green met in a grove of trees near the Hoosic River, in what was then known as Sloan's Meadow. They discussed the theology of missionary service. Their meeting was interrupted by a thunderstorm and the students took shelter under a haystack until the sky cleared. "The brevity of the shower, the strangeness of the place of refuge, and the peculiarity of their topic of prayer and conference all took hold of their imaginations and their memories."

In 1808 the Haystack Prayer group and other Williams students began a group called "The Brethren." This group was organized to "effect, in the persons of its members, a mission to" those who were not Christians. In 1812, the American Board of Commissioners for Foreign Missions (created in 1810) sent its first missionaries to the non-Christian world, to India.

In addition, the ABCFM founded a school, the Foreign Mission School, in Cornwall, Connecticut, which opened in 1817. It educated a total of 100 students, drawn from the Hawaiian islands, India and Southeast Asia, and Native American tribes.

Samuel Mills was most influential among the Haystack group to direct the modern mission movement. He played a role in the founding of the American Bible Society and the United Foreign Missionary Society.

The 1806 meeting was the first documented by Americans to begin foreign missionary work. In addition, this meeting is considered to have resulted in formation of the American Board of Commissioners for Foreign Missions. The ABCFM gave students an opportunity to go abroad and evangelize Christianity.

In its first fifty years, the ABCFM sent out more than 1250 missionaries. Most were from the smaller towns and farm villages of New England. Few were affluent, but most were trained in colleges where they had received a classical education, which included Hebrew, Latin, and Greek. When they reached the mission field, they worked to translate the Bible into new languages, some yet without a system of writing. They built educational systems in their lands of ministry. They were sometimes called upon to advise foreign governments.

Missionary reports were printed in the Missionary Herald, the magazine of the American Board established in 1821. For many Christians in America, the Missionary Herald was their window to the world. Descriptions of native customs, history, economic activities, and geographical features were included, along with accounts of the influence of the Gospel on these far-off lands. In the years before radio, movies, TV, or rapid communications, such missionary reports became primary sources for many Americans of information about foreign lands.

The ABCFM founded schools and hospitals in all the mission fields. Increasingly, its missionaries trained native leaders to continue the work of the ministry.

In 1961 the American Board merged to form the United Church Board for World Missions (UCBWM). After 150 years, the American Board had sent out nearly 5000 missionaries to 34 different fields.

In 2000, the UCBWM evolved into Wider Church Ministries of the United Church of Christ. It continues to be involved in mission around the world, in partnership with the Division of Overseas Ministries of the Christian Church (Disciples of Christ).

== Legacy and honors ==
- After the American Civil War, Byram Green organized commissioning a monument to honor the five men who founded the movement; it was erected in 1867 in Mission Park in Williamstown, Massachusetts.
- In 1906 a centennial gathering took place in Mission Park at Williams College in celebration of the earlier prayer meeting.
- In the summer of 2006, contemporary missioners celebrated the 200th anniversary of the Haystack prayer meeting.

== Mission timeline ==
1806

- Original Haystack Prayer Meeting at Sloan's Meadow by five Williams College students in Williamstown, Massachusetts.

1808

- Samuel Mills forms the Brethren, dedicated to spreading the message about missionary service

1810

- America's first foreign mission society, the American Board of Commissioners for Foreign Missions (ABCFM) is formed by Congregationalists in Massachusetts

1812

- ABCFM sends its first group of five missionaries to India (Adoniram Judson, Luther Rice, Samuel Newell, Samuel Nott, and Gordon Hall)

1819

- ABCFM sends first missionaries to Near East, including Turkey and Palestine; ABCFM sends first missionaries to Hawaii (Sandwich Islands)

1821

- The Missionary Herald, ABCFM's magazine of missionary reports, is established

1830

- ABCFM sends first missionaries to China, including Elijah Coleman Bridgman

1833

- ABCFM sends first missionaries to Africa

1854

- Byram Green returns to Williamstown. He told of the original meeting and pointed out the site of the haystack. Consequently, Sloan's Meadow was purchased by Williams College and renamed Mission Park.

1856

- Semi-centennial of the Haystack Meeting is celebrated

1867

- Marble monument is erected and dedicated on the site of the original meeting

1868

- Woman's Boards of Missions established

1906

- Centennial anniversary of the Haystack Meeting is celebrated in Williamstown

1931

- Merger of Congregational and Christian churches, forming Congregational Christian Church, with the ABCFM

1934

- Merger of the Evangelical Synod of North America and Reformed Church in the United States, forming the Evangelical and Reformed Church, with its Board of International Missions

1956

- 157th Annual Meeting of the ABCFM and Sesquicentennial of the Haystack Meeting celebrated in Williamstown

1957

- United Church of Christ established by the merger of the Congregational Christian Church and the Evangelical and Reformed Church

1961

- ABCFM merges with Board of International Missions to form the United Church Board for World Ministries (UCBWM)

1981

- 175th Anniversary of the Haystack Meeting celebrated in Williamstown

1995

- Global Ministries is established as a partnership between the UCBWM of the United Church of Christ (UCC) and the Division of Overseas Ministries (DOM) of the Christian Church (Disciples of Christ)

2000

- UCBWM becomes Wider Church Ministries, one of four UCC-covenanted ministries. Wider Church Ministries remains in partnership with DOM through Global Ministries

2006

- 200th anniversary celebration of the Haystack event in Williamstown

== See also ==
- Christian Church (Disciples of Christ)
- United Church of Christ
- Day of Prayer
- Second Great Awakening
