= New York's 27th congressional district =

U.S. House district for New York

- Obsolete district
- Years active: 1823–2023

New York’s 27th congressional district was a congressional district for the United States House of Representatives in western New York. It included all of Orleans, Genesee, Wyoming, and Livingston counties and parts of Erie, Monroe, Niagara, and Ontario counties. The district contained most of the eastern and southern suburbs of Buffalo, most of the southern suburbs of Rochester, as well as large rural areas to the east and south. The seat was last occupied by Republican Chris Jacobs, who won a special election on June 23, 2020. Previously, it had been vacant from October 1, 2019, when Republican incumbent Chris Collins resigned after pleading guilty to charges of insider trading.

== History ==
The precursor to the district was the central Erie county seat numbered the 30th district in the 1990s. In the 1980s this area was in the 33rd district. In the 1970s it was numbered the 37th district, although certain suburban areas were in the 38th district (later the 31st). None of these districts included the Jamestown area, which had always been in the southern tier district (now the 29th district) in prior maps. The 27th district covered the area now in the 26th district in the 1990s and the Syracuse area (now the 25th district) in the 1980s. It was the Southern Tier seat now numbered the 22nd in the 1970s. In the 1960s this district was in the lower Hudson Valley covering the area now in the 19th district.

The district became obsolete following the 2020 United States census. Following the reapportionment process after the 2020 census, New York came just 89 people short of retaining its 27th congressional district. The 435th seat instead went to Minnesota. The district was eliminated after the 2022 midterm elections. Most of its territory close to Buffalo was merged with the 23rd district, while the portion close to Rochester joined the 24th district.

== Election results from statewide races ==
Year	Office	Results
2008	President	McCain 54% - 44%
2012	President	Romney 55% - 43%
2012	Senate	Gillibrand 56% - 43%
2016	President	Trump 59% - 35%
2016	Senate	Schumer 55% - 43%
2018	Senate	Farley 53% - 47%
2018	Governor	Molinaro 60% - 34%
2018	Attorney General	Wofford 61% - 36%
2020	President	Trump 57% - 41%

== List of members representing the district ==
Member	Party	Years	Cong ress	Electoral history	District location (counties)
District established March 4, 1823
Moses Hayden (York)	Democratic-Republican	March 4, 1823 – March 3, 1825	18th 19th	Elected in 1822. Re-elected in 1824. [data missing]	1823–1833 [data missing]
Moses Hayden (York)	Anti-Jacksonian	March 4, 1825 – March 3, 1827	18th 19th	Elected in 1822. Re-elected in 1824. [data missing]	1823–1833 [data missing]
Daniel D. Barnard (Rochester)	Anti-Jacksonian	March 4, 1827 – March 3, 1829	20th	Elected in 1826. Lost re-election.	1823–1833 [data missing]
Timothy Childs (Rochester)	Anti-Masonic	March 4, 1829 – March 3, 1831	21st	Elected in 1828. [data missing]	1823–1833 [data missing]
Frederick Whittlesey (Rochester)	Anti-Masonic	March 4, 1831 – March 3, 1833	22nd	Elected in 1830. Redistricted to the 28th district.	1823–1833 [data missing]
Edward Howell (Bath)	Jacksonian	March 4, 1833 – March 3, 1835	23rd	Elected in 1832 [data missing]	1833–1843 [data missing]
Joshua Lee (Penn Yan)	Jacksonian	March 4, 1835 – March 3, 1837	24th	Elected in 1834. [data missing]	1833–1843 [data missing]
John T. Andrews (North Reading)	Democratic	March 4, 1837 – March 3, 1839	25th	Elected in 1836. [data missing]	1833–1843 [data missing]
Meredith Mallory (Hammondsport)	Democratic	March 4, 1839 – March 3, 1841	26th	Elected in 1838. [data missing]	1833–1843 [data missing]
William M. Oliver (Penn Yan)	Democratic	March 4, 1841 – March 3, 1843	27th	Elected in 1840. [data missing]	1833–1843 [data missing]
Byram Green (Sodus)	Democratic	March 4, 1843 – March 3, 1845	28th	Elected in 1842. [data missing]	1843–1853 [data missing]
John De Mott (Lodi)	Democratic	March 4, 1845 – March 3, 1847	29th	Elected in 1844. [data missing]	1843–1853 [data missing]
John M. Holley (Lyons)	Whig	March 4, 1847 – March 8, 1848	30th	Elected in 1846. Died.	1843–1853 [data missing]
Vacant		March 8, 1848 – November 7, 1848	30th		1843–1853 [data missing]
Esbon Blackmar (Newark)	Whig	November 7, 1848 – March 3, 1849	30th	Elected to finish Holley's term. [data missing]	1843–1853 [data missing]
William A. Sackett (Seneca Falls)	Whig	March 4, 1849 – March 3, 1853	31st 32nd	Elected in 1848. Re-elected in 1850. [data missing]	1843–1853 [data missing]
John J. Taylor (Owego)	Democratic	March 4, 1853 – March 3, 1855	33rd	Elected in 1852. [data missing]	1853–1863 [data missing]
John Mason Parker (Owego)	Opposition	March 4, 1855 – March 3, 1857	34th 35th	Elected in 1854. Re-elected in 1856. [data missing]	1853–1863 [data missing]
John Mason Parker (Owego)	Republican	March 4, 1857 – March 3, 1859	34th 35th	Elected in 1854. Re-elected in 1856. [data missing]	1853–1863 [data missing]
Alfred Wells (Ithaca)	Republican	March 4, 1859 – March 3, 1861	36th	Elected in 1858. [data missing]	1853–1863 [data missing]
Alexander S. Diven (Elmira)	Republican	March 4, 1861 – March 3, 1863	37th	Elected in 1860. [data missing]	1853–1863 [data missing]
Robert B. Van Valkenburgh (Bath)	Republican	March 4, 1863 – March 3, 1865	38th	Redistricted from the 28th district and re-elected in 1862. [data missing]	1863–1873 [data missing]
Hamilton Ward (Belmont)	Republican	March 4, 1865 – March 3, 1871	39th 40th 41st	Elected in 1864. Re-elected in 1866. Re-elected in 1868. [data missing]	1863–1873 [data missing]
Horace B. Smith (Elmira)	Republican	March 4, 1871 – March 3, 1873	42nd	Elected in 1870. Redistricted to the 28th district.	1863–1873 [data missing]
Thomas C. Platt (Owego)	Republican	March 4, 1873 – March 3, 1875	43rd	Elected in 1872. Redistricted to the 28th district.	1873–1883 [data missing]
Elbridge G. Lapham (Canandaigua)	Republican	March 4, 1875 – July 29, 1881	44th 45th 46th 47th	Elected in 1874. Re-elected in 1876. Re-elected in 1878. Re-elected in 1880. Resigned when elected U.S. Senator.	1873–1883 [data missing]
Vacant		July 30, 1881 – November 7, 1881	47th		1873–1883 [data missing]
James W. Wadsworth (Geneseo)	Republican	November 8, 1881 – March 3, 1885	47th 48th	Elected to finish Lapham's term. Re-elected in 1882. [data missing]	1873–1883 [data missing]
James W. Wadsworth (Geneseo)	Republican	November 8, 1881 – March 3, 1885	47th 48th	Elected to finish Lapham's term. Re-elected in 1882. [data missing]	1883–1893 [data missing]
Sereno E. Payne (Auburn)	Republican	March 4, 1885 – March 3, 1887	49th	Redistricted from the 26th district and re-elected in 1884. [data missing]	1883–1893 [data missing]
Newton W. Nutting (Oswego)	Republican	March 4, 1887 – October 15, 1889	50th 51st	Elected in 1886. Re-elected in 1888; Died.	1883–1893 [data missing]
Vacant		October 16, 1889 – December 2, 1889	51st		1883–1893 [data missing]
Sereno E. Payne (Auburn)	Republican	December 2, 1889 – March 3, 1893	51st 52nd	Elected to finish Nutting's term. Re-elected in 1890. Redistricted to the 28th district.	1883–1893 [data missing]
James J. Belden (Syracuse)	Republican	March 4, 1893 – March 3, 1895	53rd	Redistricted from the 25th district and re-elected in 1892. [data missing]	1893–1903 [data missing]
Theodore L. Poole (Syracuse)	Republican	March 4, 1895 – March 3, 1897	54th	Elected in 1894. [data missing]	1893–1903 [data missing]
James J. Belden (Syracuse)	Republican	March 4, 1897 – March 3, 1899	55th	Elected in 1896. [data missing]	1893–1903 [data missing]
Michael E. Driscoll (Syracuse)	Republican	March 4, 1899 – March 3, 1903	56th 57th	Elected in 1898. Re-elected in 1900. Redistricted to the 29th district.	1893–1903 [data missing]
James S. Sherman (Utica)	Republican	March 4, 1903 – March 3, 1909	58th 59th 60th	Redistricted from the 25th district and re-elected in 1902. Re-elected in 1904. Re-elected in 1906. [data missing]	1903–1913 [data missing]
Charles S. Millington (Herkimer)	Republican	March 4, 1909 – March 3, 1911	61st	Elected in 1908. [data missing]	1903–1913 [data missing]
Charles A. Talcott (Utica)	Democratic	March 4, 1911 – March 3, 1913	62nd	Elected in 1910. Redistricted to the 33rd district.	1903–1913 [data missing]
George McClellan (Chatham)	Democratic	March 4, 1913 – March 3, 1915	63rd	Elected in 1912. Lost re-election.	1913–1945; All of Columbia, Greene, Schoharie, Sullivan, Ulster
Charles B. Ward (Debruce)	Republican	March 4, 1915 – March 3, 1925	64th 65th 66th 67th 68th	Elected in 1914. Re-elected in 1916. Re-elected in 1918. Re-elected in 1920. Re-elected in 1922. Retired.	1913–1945; All of Columbia, Greene, Schoharie, Sullivan, Ulster
Harcourt J. Pratt (Highland)	Republican	March 4, 1925 – March 3, 1933	69th 70th 71st 72nd	Elected in 1924. Re-elected in 1926. Re-elected in 1928. Re-elected in 1930. Retired.	1913–1945; All of Columbia, Greene, Schoharie, Sullivan, Ulster
Philip A. Goodwin (Coxsackie)	Republican	March 4, 1933 – June 6, 1937	73rd 74th 75th	Elected in 1932. Re-elected in 1934. Re-elected in 1936. Died.	1913–1945; All of Columbia, Greene, Schoharie, Sullivan, Ulster
Vacant		June 7, 1937 – November 1, 1937	75th		1913–1945; All of Columbia, Greene, Schoharie, Sullivan, Ulster
Lewis K. Rockefeller (Chatham)	Republican	November 2, 1937 – January 3, 1943	75th 76th 77th	Elected to finish Goodwin's term. Re-elected in 1938. Re-elected in 1940. Retired.	1913–1945; All of Columbia, Greene, Schoharie, Sullivan, Ulster
Jay LeFevre (New Paltz)	Republican	January 3, 1943 – January 3, 1945	78th	Elected in 1942. Redistricted to the 30th district.	1913–1945; All of Columbia, Greene, Schoharie, Sullivan, Ulster
Ralph W. Gwinn (Bronxville)	Republican	January 3, 1945 – January 3, 1959	79th 80th 81st 82nd 83rd 84th 85th	Elected in 1944. Re-elected in 1946. Re-elected in 1948. Re-elected in 1950. Re-elected in 1952. Re-elected in 1954. Re-elected in 1956. Retired.	1945–1963; All of Putnam, parts of Westchester
Robert R. Barry (Yonkers)	Republican	January 3, 1959 – January 3, 1963	86th 87th	Elected in 1958. Re-elected in 1960. Redistricted to the 25th district.	1945–1963; All of Putnam, parts of Westchester
Katharine St. George (Tuxedo Park)	Republican	January 3, 1963 – January 3, 1965	88th	Redistricted from the 28th district and re-elected in 1962. Lost re-election.	1963–1971; All of Delaware, Orange, Rockland, Sullivan
John G. Dow (Grand View)	Democratic	January 3, 1965 – January 3, 1969	89th 90th	Elected in 1964. Re-elected in 1966. Lost re-election.	1963–1971; All of Delaware, Orange, Rockland, Sullivan
Martin B. McKneally (Newburgh)	Republican	January 3, 1969 – January 3, 1971	91st	Elected in 1968. Lost re-election.	1963–1971; All of Delaware, Orange, Rockland, Sullivan
John G. Dow (Grand View)	Democratic	January 3, 1971 – January 3, 1973	92nd	Elected in 1970. Redistricted to the 26th district and lost re-election.	1971–1973; All of Orange, Putnam, parts of Dutchess, Rockland, Sullivan
Howard W. Robison (Candor)	Republican	January 3, 1973 – January 3, 1975	93rd	Redistricted from the 33rd district and re-elected in 1972. Retired.	1973–1983; All of Broome, Sullivan, Tioga, parts of Chemung, Delaware, Tompkins, Ulster
Matthew F. McHugh (Ithaca)	Democratic	January 3, 1975 – January 3, 1983	94th 95th 96th 97th	Elected in 1974. Re-elected in 1976. Re-elected in 1978. Re-elected in 1980. Redistricted to the 28th district.	1973–1983; All of Broome, Sullivan, Tioga, parts of Chemung, Delaware, Tompkins, Ulster
George C. Wortley (Fayetteville)	Republican	January 3, 1983 – January 3, 1989	98th 99th 100th	Redistricted from the 32nd district and re-elected in 1982. Re-elected in 1984. Re-elected in 1986. Retired.	1983–1993; All of Onondaga, parts of Madison
James T. Walsh (Syracuse)	Republican	January 3, 1989 – January 3, 1993	101st 102nd	Elected in 1988. Re-elected in 1990. Redistricted to the 25th district.	1983–1993; All of Onondaga, parts of Madison
Bill Paxon (Williamsville)	Republican	January 3, 1993 – January 3, 1999	103rd 104th 105th	Redistricted from the 31st district and re-elected in 1992. Re-elected in 1994. Re-elected in 1996. Retired.	1993–2003; All of Genesee, Livingston, Ontario, Wayne, Wyoming, parts of Cayuga, Erie, Monroe, Seneca
Thomas M. Reynolds (Springville)	Republican	January 3, 1999 – January 3, 2003	106th 107th	Elected in 1998. Re-elected in 2000. Redistricted to the 26th district.	1993–2003; All of Genesee, Livingston, Ontario, Wayne, Wyoming, parts of Cayuga, Erie, Monroe, Seneca
Jack Quinn (Hamburg)	Republican	January 3, 2003 – January 3, 2005	108th	Redistricted from the 30th district and re-elected in 2002. Retired.	2003–2013 All of Chautauqua, part of Erie
Brian Higgins (Buffalo)	Democratic	January 3, 2005 – January 3, 2013	109th 110th 111th 112th	Elected in 2004. Re-elected in 2006. Re-elected in 2008. Re-elected in 2010. Redistricted to the 26th district.	2003–2013 All of Chautauqua, part of Erie
Chris Collins (Clarence)	Republican	January 3, 2013 – October 1, 2019	113th 114th 115th 116th	Elected in 2012. Re-elected in 2014. Re-elected in 2016. Re-elected in 2018. Resigned.	2013–2023 All of Orleans, Genesee, Wyoming, Livingston, parts of Erie, Monroe, Niagara, Ontario
Vacant		October 1, 2019 – July 21, 2020	116th		2013–2023 All of Orleans, Genesee, Wyoming, Livingston, parts of Erie, Monroe, Niagara, Ontario
Chris Jacobs (Orchard Park)	Republican	July 21, 2020 – January 3, 2023	116th 117th	Elected to finish Collins's term. Re-elected in 2020. Redistricted to the 23rd district and retired.	2013–2023 All of Orleans, Genesee, Wyoming, Livingston, parts of Erie, Monroe, Niagara, Ontario
District dissolved January 3, 2023

== Election results ==
In New York State electoral politics there are numerous minor parties at various points on the political spectrum. Certain parties would invariably endorse either the Republican or Democratic candidate for every office, hence the state electoral results contain both the party votes, and the final candidate votes (listed as "Recap").

1996 United States House of Representatives elections in New York: District 27
Party	Candidate	Votes	%	±%
Republican	Bill Paxon (incumbent)	142,568	59.9%	
Democratic	Thomas M. Fricano	95,503	40.1%	
Majority		47,065	19.8%	
Turnout		238,071	100%	

1998 United States House of Representatives elections in New York: District 27
Party	Candidate	Votes	%	±%
Republican	Thomas M. Reynolds	102,042	57.3%	−2.6%
Democratic	Bill Cook	75,978	42.7%	+2.6%
Majority		26,064	14.6%	−5.2%
Turnout		178,020	100%	−25.2%

2000 United States House of Representatives elections in New York: District 27
Party	Candidate	Votes	%	±%
Republican	Thomas M. Reynolds (incumbent)	157,694	69.3%	+12.0%
Democratic	Thomas W. Pecoraro	69,870	30.7%	−12.0%
Majority		87,824	38.6%	+24.0%
Turnout		227,564	100%	+27.8%

2002 United States House of Representatives elections in New York: District 27
Party	Candidate	Votes	%	±%
Republican	Jack Quinn	120,117	69.1%	−0.2%
Democratic	Peter Crotty	47,811	27.5%	−3.2%
Right to Life	Thomas Casey	3,586	2.1%	+2.1%
Green	Albert N. LaBruna	2,405	1.4%	+1.4%
Majority		72,306	41.6%	+3.0%
Turnout		173,919	100%	−23.6%

2004 United States House of Representatives elections in New York: District 27
Party	Candidate	Votes	%	±%
Democratic	Brian Higgins	143,332	50.7%	+23.2%
Republican	Nancy A. Naples	139,558	49.3%	−19.8%
Majority		3,774	1.3%	−40.3%
Turnout		282,890	100%	+62.7%

2006 United States House of Representatives elections in New York: District 27
Party	Candidate	Votes	%	±%
Democratic	Brian Higgins (incumbent)	140,027	79.3%	+28.6%
Republican	Michael J. McHale	36,614	20.7%	−28.6%
Majority		103,413	58.5%	+57.2%
Turnout		176,641	100%	−37.6%

2008 United States House of Representatives elections in New York: District 27
Party	Candidate	Votes	%	±%
Democratic	Brian Higgins (incumbent)	185,713	74.4%	−4.9%
Republican	Daniel J. Humiston	56,354	22.6%	+1.9%
Conservative	Harold W. Schroeder	7,478	3%	+3%
Majority		129,359	51.8%	−6.7%
Turnout		249,545	100%	+41.3%

2010 United States House of Representatives elections in New York: District 27
Party	Candidate	Votes	%	±%
Democratic	Brian Higgins (incumbent)	119,085	60.9%	−13.5%
Republican	Leonard A. Roberto	76,320	39.1%	+16.5%
Majority		42,765	21.9%	29.9%
Turnout		195,405	100%	−21.7%

2012 United States House of Representatives elections in New York: District 27
Party	Candidate	Votes	%	±%
Republican	Chris Collins	161,220	50.8%	+11.7%
Democratic	Kathy Hochul	156,219	49.2%	−11.7%
Majority		5,001	1.6%	−20.3%
Turnout		317,439	100%	+62.4%

2014 United States House of Representatives elections in New York: District 27
Party	Candidate	Votes	%	±%
Republican	Chris Collins (incumbent)	144,675	71.1%	+20.3%
Democratic	Jim O'Donnell	58,911	28.9%	−20.3%
Majority		85,764	42.2%	+40.6%
Turnout		203,586	100%	−35.9%

2016 United States House of Representatives elections in New York: District 27
Party	Candidate	Votes	%	±%
Republican	Chris Collins (incumbent)	220,885	67.2%	−3.9%
Democratic	Diana Kastenbaum	107,832	32.8%	+3.9%
Majority		113,053	34.4%	−7.8%
Turnout		328,717	100%	+61.4%

2018 United States House of Representatives elections in New York: District 27
Party	Candidate	Votes	%	±%
Republican	Chris Collins (incumbent)	140,146	49.1%	−18.1%
Democratic	Nate McMurray	139,059	48.8%	+16%
Reform	Larry Piegza	5,973	2.1%	+2.1%
Majority		1,087	0.3%	−34.1%
Turnout		285,178	100%	−13.2%

2020 New York's 27th congressional district special election
Party	Candidate	Votes	%	±%
Republican	Chris Jacobs	81,036	51.8%	+2.7%
Democratic	Nathan McMurray	72,787	46.5%	−2.3%
Libertarian	Duane Whitmer	1,498	1.0%	+1.0%
Green	Michael Gammariello	1,043	0.7%	+0.7%
Plurality		8,249	5.05%	+4.75%
Turnout		156,364		

2020 United States House of Representatives elections in New York: District 27
Party	Candidate	Votes	%
Republican	Chris Jacobs	192,756	50.2
Conservative	Chris Jacobs	31,027	8.1
Independence	Chris Jacobs	5,261	1.4
Total	Chris Jacobs (incumbent)	229,044	59.7
Democratic	Nate McMurray	136,783	35.7
Working Families	Nate McMurray	12,776	3.3
Total	Nate McMurray	149,559	39.0
Libertarian	Duane Whitmer	4,884	1.3
Total votes		383,487	100.0
Republican hold			

== See also ==
- List of United States congressional districts
- New York's congressional delegations
- New York's congressional districts
