= Gordon Hall (missionary) =

American missionary (1784–1826)

Gordon Hall (8 April 1784 – 20 March 1826) was one of the first two American Board of Commissioners for Foreign Missions missionaries to Bombay, then-headquarters of Bombay Presidency. He was instrumental in establishing Bombay Missionary Union, and he was the founder of the Bombay Mission or American Marathi Mission, the first American overseas mission station in the world at Bombay.

== Biography ==
He was born on 8 April 1784 in Tolland, Massachusetts to Elizabeth and Nathan Hall. He graduated from Williams College in 1808, and entered Andover Theological Seminary in 1810. While at the Andover Theological Seminay in June 1810, he joined the group of students like Adoniram Judson, Samuel John Mills, Samuel Newell, Samuel Nott, and Luther Rice, whose enthusiasm for overseas missionary service, presented themselves to the Massachusetts General Association; subsequently, resulted in the formation of American Board of Commissioners for Foreign Missions (ABCFM), the first American overseas agency in North America. ABCM having endorsed Judson, Hall, Newell, Nott, and Price for missionary service, a committee of the board sent Judson to London to inquire the possibilities of cooperation with the London Missionary Society (LMS) like joint superintendence and support of missions from LMS, and still remain under the direction of board; however, LMS declined such an agreement and instead expressed their willingness to receive Judson and his associates under their patronage, instead of joint management. Upon return, the board determined to carry on its own program and appointed the above missionaries to serve in British East India Company colonies like India, Burma, and some contiguous territory out of the British jurisdiction—The board seems to have been unable to point any specific country to occupy. The missionaries were left to decide what field to occupy after their arrival in India; thus, the first overseas missionary program from United States commenced in 1811. Having been appointed as a missionary under ABCFM in September 1811, he studied medicine at Boston and Philadelphia together with Samuel Newell—he attended medical lectures as it might increase usefulness as a missionary.

He was ordained along with Judson, Mills, Newell, Nott, and Rice on 6 February 1812 by the ABCFM at Tabernacle church, Salem, Massachusetts. Hall, Rice, along with Judson, Newell, Nott and their wives in two different groups sailed to East India Company colonies—Judson and Newell sailed from Salem on 9 February 1812, while Hall, Rice, Nott and his wife sailed from Philadelphia on 18 February 1812. Judson and Newell reached Calcutta (present Kolkata) on 17 June 1812, while Hall and others on 8 August 1812—Mills remained in United States, apparently, to promote and oversee the cause to which he was committed.

All the missionaries were warmly received by already operating Christians of different denominations in Calcutta, including William Carey, one of the Serampore Trio. But Carrey's expectations of them were not high; however, they were soon denied residence by the East India Company on ground that they were not English subjects—and also, United States and United Kingdom being at war, lately. But, they were authorized to go other places that are out of the jurisdiction of the Company. Under these circumstances—Mr.& Mrs.Samuel Newell embarked for the Isle of France, now Mauritius—Judson and Rice got baptized and resigned ABCFM that ultimately resulted in the formation of a Baptist Board for Foreign Missions in the United States—Hall and Nott, though engaged their passage to Isle of France, an unexpected detention of their vessel made them to change their plans to go Ceylon, now Sri Lanka; however, the arrival of Evan Napean, who was friend of missions and a vice-president of the British and Foreign Bible Society, as the governor of Bombay Presidency opened a better prospect for them. Hence, Hall and Nott evaded and sailed for Bombay (present Mumbai) and arrived the destination in February 1813. Later, they persuaded the Bombay governor and a vice-president of the British and Foreign Bible Society to allow them to stay, apparently, establishing the first American missionary station overseas on foreign lands at Bombay called Bombay Mission or American Marathi Mission, commencing the first mission to the Mahrattas. In 1816, he married Margaret Lewis, English woman resident of Bombay.

== American Marathi Mission ==
American Marathi Mission or Bombay Mission, the first American mission station overseas, was one of the firstfruits of the American Board of Commissioners for Foreign Missions (ABCFM), the first foreign mission agency in North America. Upon arrival after the establishment of mission station at Bombay, he soon devoted himself in learning local languages like Marathi, and others. When Americans (Hall and Nott) arrived, Mahrattas, originally an obscure piratical race, were dominant in Bombay in the early eighteenth century. For about a century, they ruled and ravaged a large part of India. Upon decline of their power, they were gradually absorbed by the British as their subjects. Americans were the first to go in among them— Unlike Tamil people in South India and northern districts of Ceylon, no preparatory work had been done for Bombay Mission, except merely that of conquest by a Christian power. At present, Mahrattas seems to stand different to the Christian religion from what they did in 1813.

As part of evangelical and missionary work as people would not come to them, they had to go to the people; accordingly, after garnering a group of hearers at temples, markets, and other places of public resort, they used to read passages of Scriptures, explaining the truths contained in them. He preached in the English church, prepared literature in Marathi language, and gave medical treatments to English people and Indians. He opened the first of thirty-five schools in 1814 and supervised schools over the course of his subsequent missionary years. He evangelized the souls of Bombay Presidency and provided medical services, especially in Hindu temples and in bazaars. He and Nott were soon joined by Samuel Newell, who commenced Ceylon Mission, at Bombay. After Nott relinquished his labors due to ill-health and reverted to United States, Hall and Newell continued the missionary work. In 1818, two more new missionaries were added to the station, the number of schools were increased to eleven, and later to twenty-one schools.

In March 1826, he visited Nassick, also spelled Nasik as part of missionary duties. When he arrived Nasik, Cholera was rampant in the town; as a result more than 200 died on the day of his visit. He stayed at Nasik till his books and medicine are distributed and set out to return home on March 18. Having already caught up with Cholera, he died on 20 March 1826 at Dodi Dapur, near Nasik, Maharashtra, India, after thirteen years of missionary work between 1813 and 1826.

== Bombay Missionary Union ==
He was instrumental in the formation of the Bombay Missionary Union in November 1825. This society was formed by the missions of the American Board, English Church Missionary Society at Bombay, those of the London Missionary Society at Bombay and Surat, and that of the Scottish Missionary Society in the southern Concan (also spelled Konkan). On this occasion, he preached a sermon that was later published, and four new natives were converted and received to the fellowship of the church.

== Bibliography ==
He published his sermons on foreign missions in 1812 and The Duty of American Churches in Respect to Foreign Missions in 1815. He wrote The Conversion of the World, or the Claims of the Six Hundred Millions in 1818, along with Samuel Newell—with this publication, Hall and Newell "proposed a strategy whereby 30,000 missionaries could reach every person on earth." [sic]. They further argued:

It is the duty of Christians to send forth preachers in sufficient numbers to furnish the means of instruction to the whole world.

In October 1826, he published Appeal to American Christians on behalf of the twelve millions speaking the Mahratta language in Missionary Herald. He translated the portions of the New Testament (Gospel of Matthew) into Marathi language, prepared a harmony of the gospels, and distributed the Christian literature—evangelical literature and tracts.

== See also ==
- Bible translations into Marathi
