= Bible translations into Marathi =

The first Marathi translation was made by Vaidyanath Sarma under the supervision of the Serampore missionaries and William Carey at Fort William College. However Carey's translation was found lacking, and was revised by two American missionaries, Gordon Hall and Samuel Newell in 1826, with a subsequent edition in 1830. Further, David Oliver Allen "superintended a translation of the Scriptures into the Mahratta language" while in charge of the Bombay printshop 1844−53.

The first colloquial version was made by Pandita Ramabai in language easy for Pune women to understand.

Later translators of the Bible include Bapuji Appaji, B. N. Athavle and Ratnakar Hari Kelkar.

In collaboration with Church centric bible translation, Free Bibles India has published a Marathi translation online.

In 2016, the New Testament of New World Translation of the Holy Scriptures was released by Jehovah's Witnesses in Marathi. It was published online (also offline in PDF format) with mobile versions released through JW Library application in App stores.
