= Harcourt J. Pratt =

American politician

Harcourt Joseph Pratt
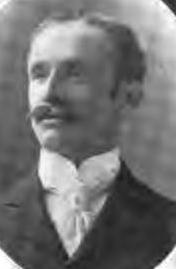
- Pratt, 1897

Member of the U.S. House of Representatives from New York's 27th district
- In office March 4, 1925 – March 3, 1933
- Preceded by: Charles B. Ward
- Succeeded by: Philip A. Goodwin

Member of the New York State Assembly from the Ulster County, 2nd district
- In office January 1 1897 – December 31, 1897
- Preceded by: James Lounsberry
- Succeeded by: Charles J. Ackert

Supervisor of Lloyd, New York
- In office 1895–1897
- Preceded by: Philip Schantz
- Succeeded by: Philip Schantz

Personal details
- Born: October 23, 1866 Highland, New York, USA
- Died: May 21, 1934 (aged 67) Port Ewen, New York, USA
- Resting place: Highland Cemetery
- Party: Republican

Harcourt Joseph Pratt (October 23, 1866 – May 21, 1934) was a U.S. representative from New York and notable politician from Ulster County.

== Early life ==
Born in Highland, New York, the son of George Washington Pratt (1840-1931) and Mary Adelaide Harcourt Pratt (1845-1909). His father served as the town of Lloyd's supervisor in 1872 and 1874. His mother was the daughter of Mathew and Sarah (Deyo) Harcourt, and through his mother he was a descendant of New Paltz patentees (founders) Christian Deyo, Louis DuBois, Abraham DuBois and Hugo Freer.

His maternal uncle John J. Harcourt married his paternal aunt, Helen Ermina Pratt, and they had Harcourt's first cousin, Mabel Harcourt Hasbrouck. Mabel's daughter Beatrice married New York politician John F. Wadlin. Another first cousin was Alfred Harcourt, publisher and co-founder of Harcourt Trade Publishers.

Pratt attended the public schools and Claverack Academy at Claverack, New York, and engaged in the lumber and coal business. He was also interested in banking.

He established the George W. Pratt Lumber Company in Highland, and held stock in many other area lumber companies, including the Kingston Lumber Corporation of Kingston, the Arnold Lumber Company of Poughkeepsie, the Beacon Coal and Lumber Company in Beacon, the Marlborough Manufacturing and Supply Company of Marlborough, and the Hudson Lumber and Supply Company.

== Political career ==
He served as member of the Board of Supervisors of Ulster County 1895-1897, due to being elected as the Supervisor of the Town of Lloyd, the same position his father had been elected to.

He was a member of the New York State Assembly in 1897. He served as director of the First National Bank of Highland since 1900 and of the Kingston Trust Co. since 1921. He was president of the Board of Education of Highland, New York from 1908 to 1926.

Pratt was elected as a Republican to the Sixty-ninth and to the three succeeding Congresses (March 4, 1925 – March 3, 1933). While in office he was a member of agricultural committees. He was not a candidate for renomination in 1932 and he resumed his former business interests.

== Death ==
He died from injuries received in an automobile accident near Port Ewen, New York, May 21, 1934. He was heading from his home in Highland to a meeting in Kingston when he mistook a turn near the Port Ewen Cemetery. He was later transported to Kingston Hospital where he succumbed to his injuries. He was interred in Highland Cemetery.

== Personal life ==
On December 3, 1890, in Humeston, Iowa, Harcourt married Mary Elizabeth Hasbrouck (March 1, 1870 in Humeston-November 10, 1940 in Kingston). She was the daughter of Jacob DuBois Hasbrouck (1838-1905) and Rowena Caroline Deyo Hasbrouck (1838-1916), and she was a member of the Hasbrouck family. Her father was the namesake of Hasbrouck Heights, New Jersey, being a general manager of the New Jersey-New York Railroad for some time. Through her mother, Mary was a third cousin of Harcourt through the Deyo family.

Harcourt and Mary had four children:

1. George Washington Pratt (1891-1953); married Florence Deyo (1890-1972), his fifth cousin. No issue.
2. Augusta Pratt (1895-1923); married Olof Sundstrom, Jr. (1894-1964), her third cousin, once removed. Two children, Mary Jane Sundstrom and Carolyn Sundstrom.
3. Jane Caroline Pratt (1897-1998); married Walter Sherwood Betts (1893-1975). Two children, Barbara Betts and Nancy Jane Betts.
4. Rowena Pratt (1908-1990); married LeGrand Haviland, Jr. (1909-1953). Three children, Rosalie Haviland, Elizabeth Anne Haviland, and Harcourt Pratt Haviland.

== Sources ==
- United States Congress. "Harcourt J. Pratt (id: P000499)". Biographical Directory of the United States Congress.

New York State Assembly
Preceded by James Lounsberry	New York State Assembly; Ulster County, 2nd District; 1897	Succeeded by Charles J. Ackert
U.S. House of Representatives
Preceded by Charles B. Ward	Member of the U.S. House of Representatives from New York's 27th congressional district 1925–1933	Succeeded by Philip A. Goodwin
Preceded by Philip Schantz	Lloyd Supervisor; Ulster County; 1895-1897	Succeeded by Philip Schantz
