= John De Mott =

American politician

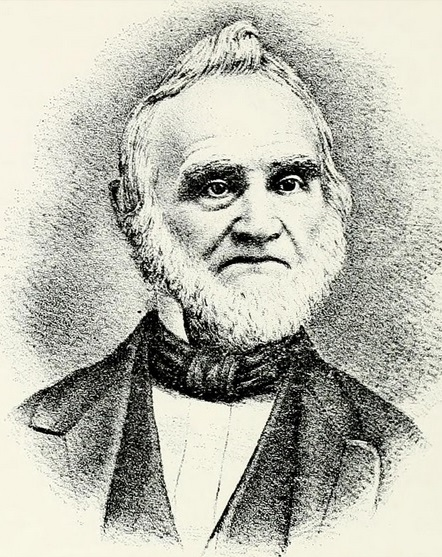

Member of the U.S. House of Representatives from New York's 27th district
- In office March 4, 1845 – March 3, 1847
- Preceded by: Byram Green
- Succeeded by: John M. Holley

New York State Assembly
- In office 1833

Personal details
- Born: October 7, 1790 Readington Township, New Jersey
- Died: July 31, 1870 (aged 79) Lodi, New York
- Resting place: Evergreen Cemetery, Ovid, New York
- Party: Democratic

Military service
- Allegiance: New York
- Branch/service: New York militia
- Rank: Major general
- Unit: Thirty-eighth Brigade

John De Mott (October 7, 1790 – July 31, 1870) was an American businessman and politician who served one term as a U.S. representative from New York from 1845 to 1847.

== Biography ==
Born in Readington Township, New Jersey, De Mott moved to Herkimer County, New York, in 1793 with his parents, who settled in what is now the town of Lodi, Seneca County. He attended the common schools. He pursued an academic course. Major general of the Thirty-eighth Brigade of the State militia.

=== Early political career ===
Supervisor in the town of Covert in 1823 and 1824 and of Lodi in 1826, 1827, 1829, and 1830. He engaged in mercantile pursuits in Lodi, New York, for more than forty years. He served as member of the State assembly in 1833. He was an unsuccessful candidate for election in 1840 to the Twenty-seventh Congress.

=== Congress ===
De Mott was elected as a Democrat to the Twenty-ninth Congress (March 4, 1845 – March 3, 1847). He was not a candidate for renomination in 1846.

=== Later career and death ===
He resumed his former business pursuits and also engaged in the banking business.

He died in Lodi, New York, July 31, 1870. He was interred in Evergreen Cemetery, Ovid, New York.

U.S. House of Representatives
Preceded by Byram Green	Member of the U.S. House of Representatives from New York's 27th congressional district 1845–1847	Succeeded by John M. Holley
