= Harriet Newell =

American Christian missionary and memoirist

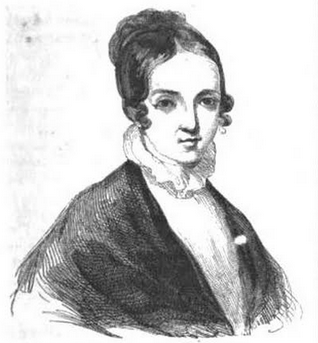
Harriet Newell

Harriet Newell (née Atwood; October 10, 1793 – November 30, 1812) was a Christian missionary and memoirist. She was the first American to die in foreign mission service.

== Biography ==
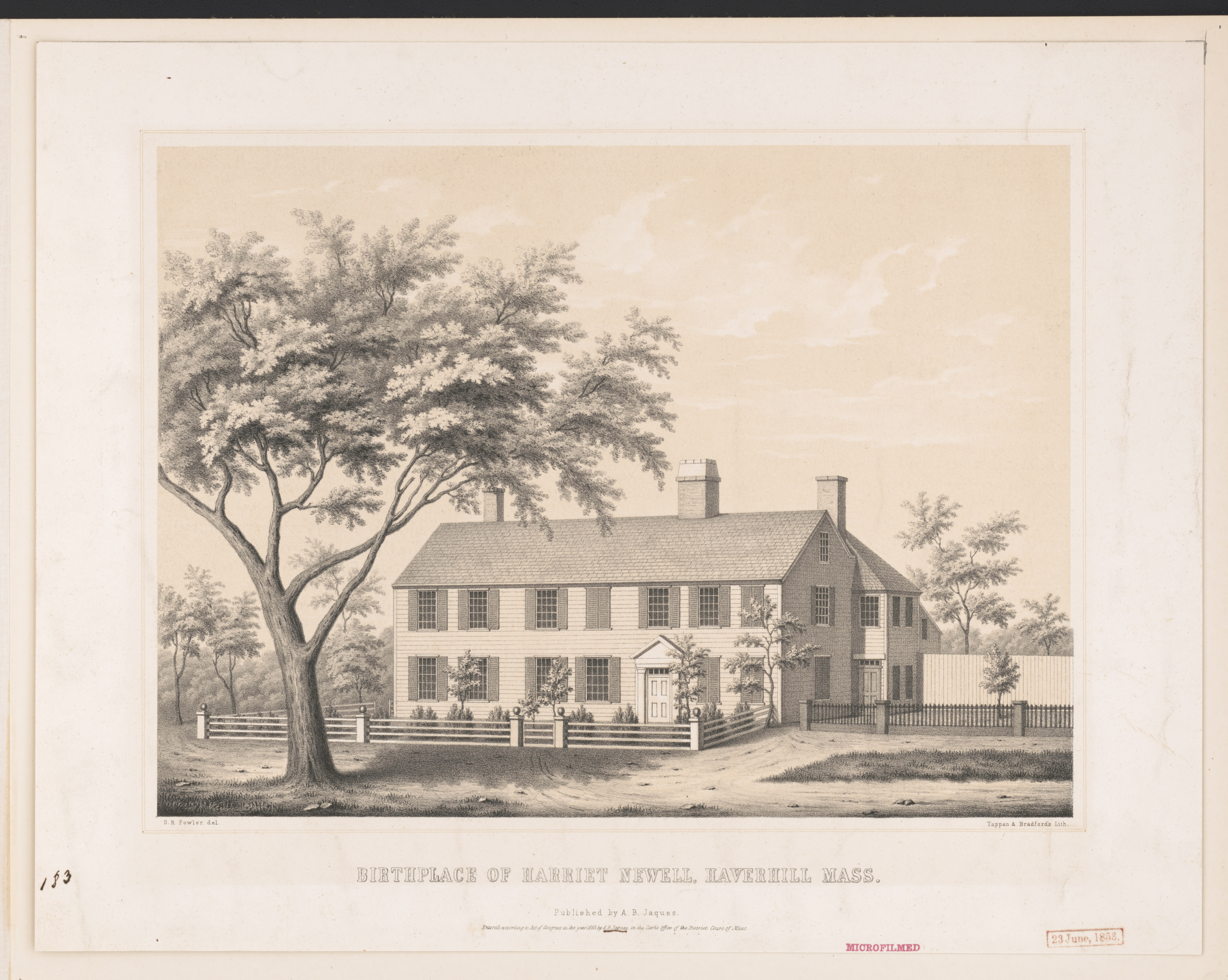
Birthplace of Harriet Newell

Harriet Atwood was born at Haverhill, Massachusetts on October 10, 1793. In 1806, while at school at Bradford, Massachusetts, she became deeply impressed with the importance of religion. In 1809, at the age of sixteen, she joined the First Congregational Church, in Roxbury.

She had developed an interest in missions through a courtship with Rev. Samuel Newell, missionary to the Burman empire. On February 9, 1812, they married. In the same month, the Newells sailed to India, along with Adoniram Judson, his wife Ann, Samuel Nott, and Nott's wife. On their arrival at Calcutta in June 1812, they were denied residence by British East India Company and were asked to leave. Accordingly, the Newells took a ship to Mauritius. At sea, three weeks before reaching the island, she gave birth to a child who died after five days.

== Death and legacy ==
Newell died November 30, 1812 in Mauritius, less than a year into her journey. She left a journal and a few letters, the record of her religious feelings, and the events of her short missionary life. They were published posthumously. going into a number of editions.

Following their publication, she became a hero and role model for Christians during the nineteenth century. Many children were named for her over the following decades, including Harriet Newell Noyes who also went on to be a missionary.
