= Lewis K. Rockefeller =

American politician (1875–1948)

Lewis Kirby Rockefeller
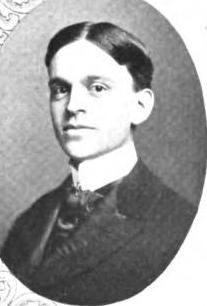
- Rockefeller in 1903

Member of the U.S. House of Representatives from New York's 27th district
- In office November 2, 1937 – January 3, 1943
- Preceded by: Philip A. Goodwin
- Succeeded by: Jay Le Fevre

Personal details
- Born: November 25, 1875 Schenectady, New York, US
- Died: September 18, 1948 (aged 72) Canaan, New York, US
- Party: Republican
- Spouse: Clara Bain
- Relations: Rockefeller family
- Parent(s): Spencer R. Rockefeller; Henrietta Kirby
- Education: New York State College

Lewis Kirby Rockefeller (November 25, 1875 – September 18, 1948) was a United States representative from New York.

== Early life ==
Rockefeller was born on November 25, 1875, in Schenectady, New York, to Spencer R. Rockefeller (1849–1925) and Henrietta 'Nettie' (Kirby) Rockefeller (1853–1922). He attended the public schools and graduated from New York State College in Albany, 1898.

== Career ==
He was principal of a grammar school at North Germantown, New York and was employed in the finance bureau of the New York State Department of Public Instruction from 1898 to 1904. He was chief accountant of the municipal accounts bureau in the New York State Comptroller's office from 1905 to 1915 and was deputy State tax commissioner from 1915 to 1921. He was deputy State commissioner of taxation and finance from 1921 to 1933, and engaged in the accounting and auditing business in 1933.

Rockefeller was a delegate to the 1936 Republican National Convention. He was elected as a Republican to the 75th United States Congress to fill the vacancy caused by the death of Philip A. Goodwin. He ran on a platform of opposition to Roosevelt's New Deal. He was re-elected to the 76th and 77th United States Congresses, and held office from November 2, 1937 to January 3, 1943. While in Congress, he served on the Territories, Immigration and Claims Committee.

Afterwards he resumed his activities as an accountant and tax consultant in Chatham, New York.

== Personal life ==
He was married to Clara Bain (1877–1973) and died in Canaan, New York in 1948; interment was in Kinderhook Cemetery, Kinderhook.

U.S. House of Representatives
Preceded by Philip A. Goodwin	Member of the U.S. House of Representatives from New York's 27th congressional district 1937–1943	Succeeded by Jay Le Fevre
