= William M. Oliver =

American politician

Member of the U.S. House of Representatives from New York's 27th district
- In office March 4, 1841 – March 3, 1843
- Preceded by: Meredith Mallory
- Succeeded by: Byram Green

Member of the New York Senate
- In office 1827–1830
- Preceded by: Jonas Earll, Jr.
- Succeeded by: William H. Seward

Acting Lieutenant Governor of New York
- In office 1830–1830
- Governor: Enos T. Throop
- Preceded by: Charles Stebbins
- Succeeded by: Edward Philip Livingston

Personal details
- Born: William Morrison Oliver; October 15, 1792 Londonderry, New Hampshire, U.S.
- Died: July 21, 1863 (aged 70) Penn Yan, New York, U.S.
- Resting place: Lake View Cemetery
- Party: Democratic
- Spouse(s): Harriet Maria Seelye; Eleanor Young
- Relations: Oliver A. Morse, nephew
- Children: 7
- Profession: Lawyer, politician, and judge

William Morrison Oliver (October 15, 1792 – July 21, 1863) was an American politician, attorney, and jurist who served one term as a United States representative for the state of New York from 1841 to 1843. He had earlier served briefly as the acting lieutenant governor of New York.

== Early life ==
Oliver was born in Londonderry in Rockingham County, New Hampshire on October 15, 1792. He and his identical twin brother, Andrew, were the sons of Andrew and Elizabeth Ormiston Oliver. He received a limited education before studying law in Springfield, Massachusetts under the direction of Judge Morse in Cherry Valley, New York.

== Career ==
He was admitted to the bar around 1812 and began practice in Penn Yan, New York.

=== State legislature and Lt. Governor ===
Oliver was the First Judge of the Yates County Court from 1823 to 1828 and 1838 to 1844.

He was a member of the New York State Senate from the 7th District from 1827 to 1830, sitting in the 50th, 51st, 52nd and 53rd New York State Legislatures.

In 1830, he was elected president pro tempore of the State Senate and was Acting Lieutenant Governor of New York until the end of the year.

=== Congress ===
Elected as a Democrat to the 27th United States Congress, Oliver was United States Representative holding office from March 4, 1841, to March 3, 1843. Afterwards, he became clerk of the New York Supreme Court and was founding president of the Yates County Bank from its charter in 1832 until 1857.

== Personal life ==
Oliver married Eleanor Young in 1811. Their children were Andrew, James, and John Morrison. They lived in 158 Main Street in Penn Yan on what is now called Mansion Row in a Greek revival style house that was built in 1820 and is now part of the Penn Yan Historic District.

After Eleanor died in 1834, he married Harriet Maria Seelye. They had four children: James Morse, William Seelye, Harriet, and Henry. His nephew, Oliver A. Morse, was also an attorney who served in United States Congress from New York.

Oliver died in Penn Yan on July 21, 1863. He was buried at Lake View Cemetery in Penn Yan.

== Legacy ==
The William M. Oliver house was given to the city of Penn Yar by Carrie E. Oliver to use as a community center, public library, reading room, and museum. Oliver was represented in a mural painted by the 4-H in Penn Yan in 1976.

New York State Senate
Preceded by Jonas Earll, Jr.	New York State Senate; Seventh District (Class 4); 1827–1830	Succeeded by William H. Seward
Political offices
Preceded by Charles Stebbins; Acting	Lieutenant Governor of New York; Acting; 1830	Succeeded by Edward Philip Livingston
U.S. House of Representatives
Preceded by Meredith Mallory	Member of the U.S. House of Representatives from New York's 27th congressional district 1841–1843	Succeeded by Byram Green
