= Joshua Lee (New York politician) =

American politician (1783–1842)

Joshua Lee (1783 – December 29, 1842) was an American physician and War of 1812 veteran who served one term as a United States representative from New York from 1835 to 1837.

== Biography ==
Born in Hudson in 1783, he studied medicine and was licensed to practice in 1804.

=== War of 1812 ===
He was commissioned in 1811 by Gov. Daniel D. Tompkins as surgeon of Colonel Avery Smith's regiment of Infantry and served in that capacity during the War of 1812.

=== Political career ===
He was town supervisor of Benton in 1815 and was a member of the New York State Assembly in 1817 and again in 1833.

Lee was elected as a Jacksonian to the Twenty-fourth Congress (March 4, 1835 – March 3, 1837).

=== Later career and death ===
After leaving Congress, he resumed the practice of his profession. He was an unsuccessful candidate for election to the U.S. Senate in 1839.

He died in Penn Yan, New York in 1842 and was interred in Lake View Cemetery.

U.S. House of Representatives
Preceded by Edward Howell	Member of the U.S. House of Representatives from New York's 27th congressional district 1835–1837	Succeeded by John T. Andrews
