= Charles B. Ward =

American politician

Charles Bonnell Ward
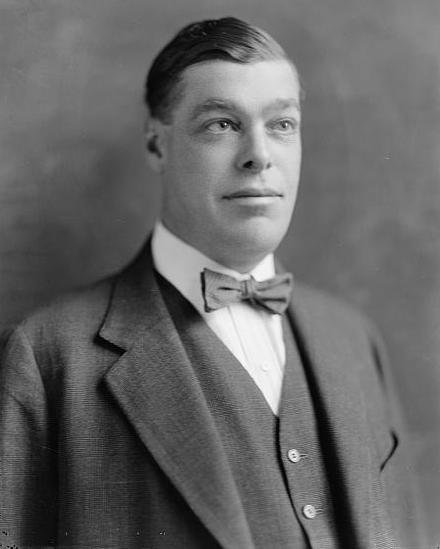

Member of the U.S. House of Representatives from New York's 27th district
- In office March 4, 1915 – March 3, 1925
- Preceded by: George McClellan
- Succeeded by: Harcourt J. Pratt

Personal details
- Born: April 27, 1879 Newark, New Jersey, U.S.
- Died: May 27, 1946 (aged 67) Liberty, New York, U.S.

Charles Bonnell Ward (April 27, 1879 – May 27, 1946) was a U.S. representative from New York.

Born in Newark, New Jersey, Ward attended the public schools and was graduated from Pennsylvania Military College (now Widener University) in 1899. He moved to New York and settled in Debruce. He engaged in agricultural pursuits. He was editor and owner of the Liberty Register at Liberty, New York, from 1910 to 1928.

Ward was elected as a Republican to the Sixty-fourth and to the four succeeding Congresses (March 4, 1915 – March 3, 1925). He declined to be a candidate for reelection in 1924 to the Sixty-ninth Congress. He resumed agricultural pursuits. He was owner and operator of the De Bruce Club Inn until his death. He died at Liberty, New York, May 27, 1946. He was interred in Mount Pleasant Cemetery, Newark, New Jersey.

== Sources ==
- United States Congress. "Charles B. Ward (id: W000129)". Biographical Directory of the United States Congress.

U.S. House of Representatives
Preceded by George McClellan	Member of the U.S. House of Representatives from New York's 27th congressional district 1915–1925	Succeeded by Harcourt J. Pratt
