= Samuel Newell =

American missionary (1784–1821)

Rev. Samuel Newell, founder of the ACM in Jaffna, Ceylon

Samuel Newell (1784–1821) was an American missionary and one of the pioneers of American foreign missions. He served with the American Board of Commissioners for Foreign Missions in India and Ceylon, where he founded the first American Ceylon Mission station.

== Biography ==
The youngest of nine children, Newell was born to Ebenezer and Catherine Newell on 24 July 1784 in Durham, Maine. He lost his mother when he was three, and his father when he was fourteen years old. At the age of fourteen Newell went to Portland, and on sight-seeing tour he accepted an offer of a captain of a vessel that lay in the harbor; consequently, he moved to Boston. In Boston, he studied at Roxbury Grammar School and entered Harvard College in 1803. During his time in college, Newell was influenced by the preaching of Dr. Stillman, pastor of the first Baptist church in Boston. In October 1804, he became a member of the First Congregational Church in Roxbury, under the ministry of Dr. Porter.

Newell graduated from Harvard College in 1807 and started working as an assistant teacher at the Grammar School in Roxbury; later, he took charge of the Academy at Lynn. Having decided to devote himself to the ministry, he entered Andover Theological Seminary in 1809. While at Andover Seminary, he joined the group of Christian students who were eager to undertake foreign missionary work. After graduating from the seminary in 1810, he preached for a brief period at Rowley, near Newburyport. In 1810 Newell and Samuel Mills, Adoniram Judson, Gordon Hall, Samuel Nott, and Luther Rice offered themselves to Congregational clergy of Massachusetts as missionaries; subsequently the American Board of Commissioners for Foreign Missions (ABCFM) was formed in 1812.

Newell later studied medicine while awaiting passage to India, and was ordained along with Judson, Mills, Hall, Nott, and Rice in February 1812, by the ABCFM at Salem, Massachusetts. In February 1812, he married Harriet Atwood, who had already joined Congregational church in 1809 and had developed interest in missions through Newell's courtship. Newell, Nott, Judson and their wives, along with Hall and Rice, sailed to India in February 1812 and arrived Calcutta in June 1812. Upon their arrival in Calcutta they were denied residence by British East India Company and were asked to leave; as a result Samuel and Harriet took a ship to Mauritius. On the long and stormy voyage, Harriet gave birth to a child that died soon after birth and was buried at sea. Harriet died soon after landing, becoming the first American to die in foreign mission service.

Newell later sailed to Ceylon where he spent a year preaching and investigating mission opportunities. Upon learning that Hall and Nott had succeeded in establishing the first foreign mission in Bombay, he joined them in 1814.

On March 26, 1818, he married Philomela Thurston, an American missionary who had arrived in Bombay a short time earlier. The couple's only child, born the following year, was named after Newell's first wife: Harriet Atwood Newell.

Newell spent most of his missionary service in evangelism, establishing schools, and publishing books and Christian literature. He visited cholera victims at Tannah, and died suddenly from that disease on May 30, 1821.

== Bibliography ==
Samuel Newell and Gordon Hall published an elaborate and widely circulated plan for the evangelization of the world entitled The Conversion of the World, or the Claims of the Six Hundred Millions, and the Ability and Duty of the Churches in 1818. He published his sermon A Sermon Preached at Haverhill (Massachusetts) in Remembrance of Mrs. Herriot Newell in 1814.

=== Other works ===
- Memoirs of Mrs. Harriet Newell,: Wife of the Rev. Samuel Newell, Missionary to India, who Died at the Isle of France, Nov. 30, 1812, Aged 19 Years.

== See also ==
- Tellippalai
- Notable alumni of Andover Theological Seminary
- American Ceylon Mission
