= Samuel Nott =

American pioneer (1788–1869)

Samuel Nott (11 September 1788 – 1 June 1869) was one of the pioneers of American foreign missions. He was one of the first five foreign missionaries under American Board of Commissioners for Foreign Missions to India, and established the Bombay Mission station, the first Americans overseas mission station in Bombay, then-headquarters of the Bombay Presidency of the British Raj.

He published several sermons and books, notably Sixteen Years' Preaching and Procedure at Wareham, Slavery and the Remedy, and many more.

== Biography ==
Nott was born on September 11, 1788, in Franklin, Connecticut. His father Samuel Nott Sr. (1754–1852) was the pastor of the Congregational church in Franklin and patriarch of the New England clergy. Nott Jr. was admitted to his father's church in 1805. Under the guidance of his father, his education commenced in his early childhood.

He graduated from Union College in July 1808, and from Andover Theological Seminary in 1808. While studying at Andover, a group of like-minded Christians, namely Adoniram Judson, Samuel Newell, Luther Rice, Gordon Hall, and Samuel John Mills, presented their enthusiasm for overseas missionary service to the General Association of Congregational Churches, Bradford, Massachusetts; later, in 1812 Mills led the establishment of the American Board of Commissioners for Foreign Missions (ABCFM), the first foreign mission agency in North America. He, including Newell, Judson, Hall, Rice, and Mills, were ordained by the ABCFM on February 6, 1812; accordingly, Judson, Newell, Nott and their wives, Hall, and Rice were sent as the first five American missionaries to India in 1812. However, Mills stayed back in the United States to oversee their cause.

In 1812, upon reaching Calcutta, they were denied residence and were ordered to be deported by the colonial British East India Company; hence, the group went to neighbouring lands. Samuel Newell and Harriet Newell tried to start a mission station outside of the British territory on the Isle of France (present-day Mauritius) and finally started a mission in Ceylon. Adoniram Judson and Luther Rice became Baptists during their voyage to the East and resigned from the ABCFM. The Judsons later made their way to Serampore to work with the Baptist mission operating there. Luther Rice returned to the United States to solicit funds for the establishment and maintenance of the Baptist Mission in India. Unlike their fellow missionaries, Samuel Nott and Gordon Hall left Calcutta and found refuge in Bombay, where they started a covert mission work. The mission station was later to be called "Bombay Mission", the first mission station by Americans overseas.

Over the period, Hall and Nott established mission stations at Thane and Mahim. Their missionary activities included preaching the gospel, translating the scriptures into local languages, publishing evangelical Christian literature, and operating schools; one school operated by them instructed Jewish children in the Hebrew and Marathi languages.

With broken health, Nott returned to the United States in 1816, and worked as a schoolteacher in New York City till 1823. Between 1823 and 1829, he served as a pastor in Galway, New York, and in Wareham, Massachusetts, from 1829 to 1849. Later, he founded a private Academy at Wareham, where he served between 1849 and 1866. After he retired from active labours, he resided at Wareham and Hartford, Connecticut, and died in Hartford on June 1, 1869.

== See also ==
- Notable alumni of Andover Theological Seminary
