= Theodore L. Poole =

American politician

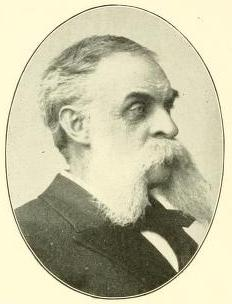
- Born: April 10, 1840; Jordan, New York
- Died: December 23, 1900 (aged 60)
- Occupation: Politician

Theodore Lewis Poole (April 10, 1840 – December 23, 1900) was a U.S. representative from New York.

Born in Jordan, New York, Poole moved with his parents to Syracuse, New York, in 1842. He attended the common schools. During the Civil War enlisted as quartermaster sergeant in the One Hundred and Twenty-second Regiment, New York Volunteers, in July 1862. He was discharged as captain and brevet major July 3, 1865. County clerk of Onondaga County in 1868–1870. United States pension agent for the western district of New York in 1879–1888. Commander of the Department of New York, Grand Army of the Republic, in 1892. Connected with various manufacturing industries and corporations. He served as director of the Bank of Syracuse.

Poole was elected as a Republican to the Fifty-fourth Congress (March 4, 1895 – March 3, 1897). He was an unsuccessful candidate for reelection in 1896 to the Fifty-fifth Congress. He was appointed United States marshal of New York in 1899 and served until his death in Syracuse, New York, December 23, 1900. He was interred in Oakwood Cemetery.

== Sources ==
- United States Congress. "Theodore L. Poole (id: P000429)". Biographical Directory of the United States Congress.

U.S. House of Representatives
Preceded by James J. Belden	Member of the U.S. House of Representatives from New York's 27th congressional district 1895–1897	Succeeded by James J. Belden
