= George McClellan (New York politician) =

American politician

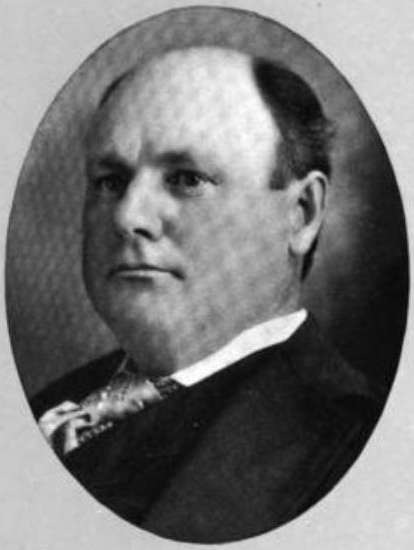

Member of the U.S. House of Representatives from New York's 27th district
- In office March 4, 1913 – March 3, 1915
- Preceded by: Charles A. Talcott
- Succeeded by: Charles B. Ward

Personal details
- Born: October 10, 1856 Schodack, New York
- Died: February 20, 1927 (aged 70) Kinderhook, New York
- Party: Democratic Party
- Education: Albany Law School

George McClellan (October 10, 1856 – February 20, 1927) was an American lawyer and politician who served one term as a member of the United States House of Representatives from New York from 1913 to 1915.

== Biography ==
He was born in Schodack, New York and attended the public schools and the local academies at Columbia County, New York. These were Spencertown and Chatham, New York; was graduated from the Albany Law School in 1880; was admitted to the bar and commenced practice in Chatham; police justice for two terms; president of the Columbia County Agriculture Society for ten years; served as postmaster of Chatham; surrogate of Columbia County 1907–1913.

=== Congress ===
He was elected as a Democrat to the Sixty-third Congress (March 4, 1913 – March 3, 1915), and was an unsuccessful candidate for reelection in 1914 to the Sixty-fourth Congress.

=== Later career and death ===
He was a delegate to the Democratic National Convention in 1920.

After his period in Congress, he resumed the practice of his profession in Chatham, New York; moved to Kinderhook, Columbia County, and died there February 20, 1927; interment in Nassau-Schodack Cemetery at Nassau, New York.

U.S. House of Representatives
Preceded by Charles A. Talcott	Member of the U.S. House of Representatives from New York's 27th congressional district 1913–1915	Succeeded by Charles B. Ward
