= John T. Andrews (politician) =

American politician (1803–1894)

John Tuttle Andrews

Member of the U.S. House of Representatives from New York's 27th district
- In office March 4, 1837 – March 3, 1839
- Preceded by: Joshua Lee
- Succeeded by: Meredith Mallory

Personal details
- Born: May 29, 1803 Schoharie Creek, New York
- Died: June 11, 1894 (aged 91) Dundee, New York
- Citizenship: United States
- Party: Democratic Party
- Spouse: Ann Eliza Andrews
- Profession: Teacher, businessman, sheriff, politician

John Tuttle Andrews (May 29, 1803 – June 11, 1894) was an American educator and politician who served one term as a U.S. Representative from New York from 1837 to 1839.

== Biography ==
Born near Schoharie Creek, New York, Andrews was the son of Ichabod and Lola Tuttle Andrews. He moved with his parents in 1813 to Reading, New York, near Dundee, Yates County, New York. He attended the district school and also was privately tutored. He married his cousin Ann Eliza Andrews in 1832, and the couple had one child, a son who died in infancy.

== Career ==
Andrews taught school for several years, and engaged in mercantile pursuits in Irelandville and Watkins. He was Justice of the Peace and sheriff of Steuben County in 1836 and 1837.

Elected as a Democrat to the Twenty-fifth Congress, Andrews served from March 4, 1837 to March 3, 1839. Not a candidate for renomination in 1838, he purchased an estate in Dundee, New York, and again engaged in mercantile pursuits, from 1866 until 1877. Then he again retired from business pursuits to care for his personal estate.

== Death ==
Andrews died in Dundee, New York, on June 11, 1894 (age 91 years, 13 days). He is interred at Hillside Cemetery, Dundee, New York.

U.S. House of Representatives
Preceded by Joshua Lee	Member of the U.S. House of Representatives from New York's 27th congressional district March 4, 1837 – March 3, 1839	Succeeded by Meredith Mallory
