= Michael E. Driscoll =

American politician (1851–1929)

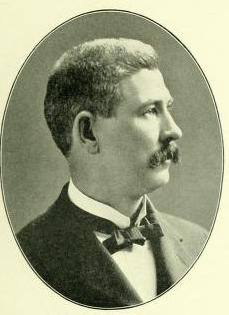

Chairman of the Committee on Elections No. 3
- In office 1903–1911

Member of the U.S. House of Representatives from New York
- In office March 4, 1899 – March 3, 1913
- Preceded by: James J. Belden
- Succeeded by: James S. Parker
- Constituency: 27th district (1899–1903); 29th district (1903–13)

Personal details
- Born: February 9, 1851 Syracuse, New York, US
- Died: January 19, 1929 (aged 77) Syracuse, New York, US
- Resting place: Oakwood Cemetery, Syracuse, New York
- Party: Republican
- Education: Williams College

Michael Edward Driscoll (February 9, 1851 – January 19, 1929) was an American lawyer and politician from New York.

== Life ==
Born in Syracuse, New York, Driscoll moved with his parents to the town of Camillus, Onondaga County, in 1852. He attended the district schools, Monro Collegiate Institute, in Elbridge, Onondaga County, and graduated from Williams College in 1877. Then he studied law, was admitted to the bar in 1879, and commenced practice in Syracuse, New York.

He was appointed one of five commissioners to draft a uniform charter for second-class cities in the State. He was appointed attorney for the State superintendent of insurance in 1905. He served as member of the Taft party that visited the Philippine Islands and Asian countries in 1905. He served as chairman of the Republican State Convention in 1906.

Driscoll was elected as a Republican to the Fifty-sixth and to the six succeeding Congresses, holding office from March 4, 1899, to March 3, 1913. He was Chairman of the Committee on Elections No. 3 (Fifty-eighth through Sixty-first Congresses).

He engaged in the practice of law, traveling, and lecturing on his travels.

He died in Syracuse, New York, January 19, 1929; and was buried at the Oakwood Cemetery there.

U.S. House of Representatives
Preceded by James J. Belden	Member of the U.S. House of Representatives from New York's 27th congressional district 1899–1903	Succeeded by James S. Sherman
Preceded by Charles W. Gillet	Member of the U.S. House of Representatives from New York's 29th congressional district 1903–1913	Succeeded by James S. Parker
