= James J. Belden =

American politician (1825–1904)

James Jerome Belden
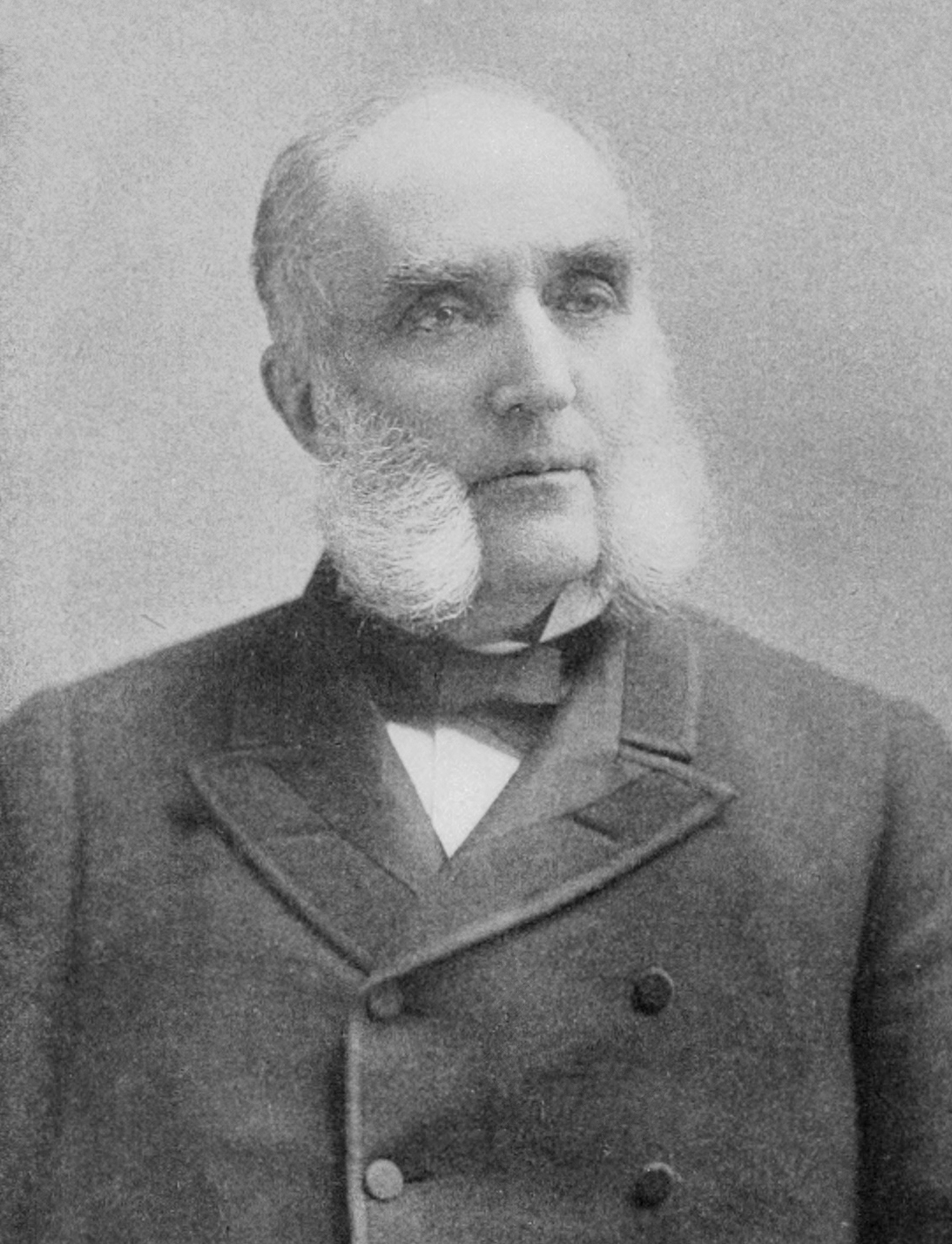

Member of the U.S. House of Representatives from New York
- In office March 4, 1897 – March 3, 1899
- Preceded by: Theodore L. Poole
- Succeeded by: Michael E. Driscoll
- Constituency: 27th district
- In office November 8, 1887 – March 3, 1895
- Preceded by: Frank Hiscock
- Succeeded by: Theodore L. Poole
- Constituency: 25th district (1887–93); 27th district (1893–95)

Personal details
- Born: September 30, 1825 Fabius, New York, US
- Died: January 1, 1904 (aged 78) Syracuse, New York, US
- Party: Republican
- Spouse: Mary Anna Gere Belden
- Children: Harriet Anna Belden
- Profession: banker; builder; hotel owner; politician

James Jerome Belden (September 30, 1825 – January 1, 1904) was an American politician and a U.S. representative from New York.

== Biography ==
Born in Fabius, New York, Belden was the son of Royal Denison Belding and Olive Cadwell and attended the common schools. He married Mary Anna Gere and they had a daughter, Harriet Anna Belden. He lived in the luxurious Belden House at 620 W. Genesee St. in Syracuse.

== Career ==
After completing his education in local schools, Belden worked in a Jefferson County store to learn bookkeeping and accounting. He went into banking in Syracuse, New York, in 1880. Later he was active in construction, completing many railroads and public works projects. He was also President of the company that published the Syracuse Post and was a hotel owner. In 1877 and 1878, he served as mayor of Syracuse, New York. Among his activities as mayor, he formed a committee of citizens to look after the interests of St. Joseph's Hospital. He later left the hospital a bequest of $50,000.

Belden was elected as a Republican to the Fiftieth Congress to fill the vacancy caused by the resignation of Frank Hiscock, who had been elected to the office of United States Senator.

Reelected to the Fifty-first and Fifty-second Congresses, Belden served as U. S. Representative for the twenty-fifth district of New York from November 8, 1887, to March 3, 1893. He was then elected for the Fifty-third Congress and served as U. S. Representative for the twenty-seventh district of New York from March 4, 1893, to March 3, 1895. He was not a candidate for renomination in 1894.

Again elected to the Fifty-fifth Congress, Belden served as U. S. Representative for the twenty-seventh district of New York from March 4, 1897, to March 3, 1899. He was not a candidate for renomination in 1898, but retired to Syracuse.

== Death ==
Belden died of uremic poisoning in Syracuse, New York on January 1, 1904 (age 78 years, 93 days). He is interred at Oakwood Cemetery (Syracuse, New York). When he died, he was Syracuse's richest citizen with his wealth being estimated at $10 million ($330 million in 2022 dollars), according to an obituary in The Sheffield Observer on January 7, 1914.

U.S. House of Representatives
Preceded by Frank Hiscock	Member of the U.S. House of Representatives from New York's 25th congressional district November 8, 1887 – March 3, 1893	Succeeded by James S. Sherman
Preceded by Sereno E. Payne	Member of the U.S. House of Representatives from New York's 27th congressional district March 4, 1893 – March 3, 1895	Succeeded by Theodore L. Poole
Preceded by Theodore L. Poole	Member of the U.S. House of Representatives from New York's 27th congressional district March 4, 1897 – March 3, 1899	Succeeded by Michael E. Driscoll
