= Byram Green =

American politician

Member of the U.S. House of Representatives from New York's 27th district
- In office March 4, 1843 – March 3, 1845
- Preceded by: William M. Oliver
- Succeeded by: John De Mott

Personal details
- Born: April 15, 1786 East Windsor, Berkshire County, Massachusetts, U.S.
- Died: October 18, 1865 (aged 79) Sodus, New York, U.S.
- Party: Democratic
- Profession: Politician

Byram Green (April 15, 1786 – October 18, 1865) was a New York state legislator for years in the Assembly and Senate, from 1816 to 1824. In 1842, he was elected United States representative from New York and served one term from 1843 to 1845.

== Early life and education ==
Born in Windsor, Massachusetts, Green attended the public schools.

He earned a degree from Williams College in 1808. There in the summer of 1806, Green was among the five participants in the Haystack Prayer Meeting. Within a few years, those men launched the American missionary movement.

Green was later instrumental in having a monument created to honor that meeting and movement. It was placed at Mission Park at Williams College.

== Career ==
Green became a professor in a college at Beaufort, South Carolina in 1810. He went on to study ("read") law with practitioners, in the tradition of the day, and was admitted to the bar. He began to practice law.

=== War of 1812 ===
He went to New York, where he settled in Sodus. During the War of 1812, he fought in the Battle of Sodus Point.

=== State assembly ===
In 1816 Green was first elected to the New York State Assembly, where he served until 1822, upon re-election. After that, he was elected to the New York State Senate in 1823 and 1824.

=== Congress ===
Green was elected as a Democrat from New York's 27th congressional district in the Twenty-eighth Congress. He held office from March 4, 1843 to March 3, 1845.

=== Death ===
He died in Sodus, New York in 1865.

New York State Senate
Preceded by new district	New York State Senate; Seventh District (Class 2); 1823–1824	Succeeded by John C. Spencer
U.S. House of Representatives
Preceded by William M. Oliver	Member of the U.S. House of Representatives from New York's 27th congressional district 1843–1845	Succeeded by John De Mott
