= Meredith Mallory =

American politician

Member of the U.S. House of Representatives from New York's 27th district
- In office March 4, 1839 – March 3, 1841
- Preceded by: John T. Andrews
- Succeeded by: William M. Oliver

Personal details
- Born: January 31, 1781 Watertown, Connecticut, U.S.
- Died: September 22, 1855 (aged 74) Batavia, Illinois, U.S.
- Resting place: West Batavia Cemetery, Batavia, Illinois, U.S.
- Party: Democratic

Meredith Mallory (January 31, 1781 – September 22, 1855) was an American politician who served one term as a U.S. Representative from New York from 1839 to 1841.

== Biography ==
Born in Watertown, Connecticut on January 31, 1781, Mallory attended the common schools and relocated to Yates County, New York, where he worked as a wheelwright and farmed.

=== Military service ===
During the War of 1812 he served as a First Lieutenant in New York's 42nd Regiment of Militia.

=== Political career ===
He was elected Benton, New York's Town Assessor in 1819, and served as Town Supervisor in 1820. He later moved to Hammondsport, New York, where he owned and operated a mill and held several local offices. He served as a member of the New York State Assembly in 1835, and a Justice of the Peace in 1838. In 1837 he was active in organizing residents in the Southern Tier to lobby the New York and Lake Erie Railroad to create the Cohocton Route, which aided in the economic development of New York's central and southwestern counties.

==== Congress ====
He was elected as a Democrat to the Twenty-sixth Congress (March 4, 1839 – March 3, 1841).

=== Later career ===
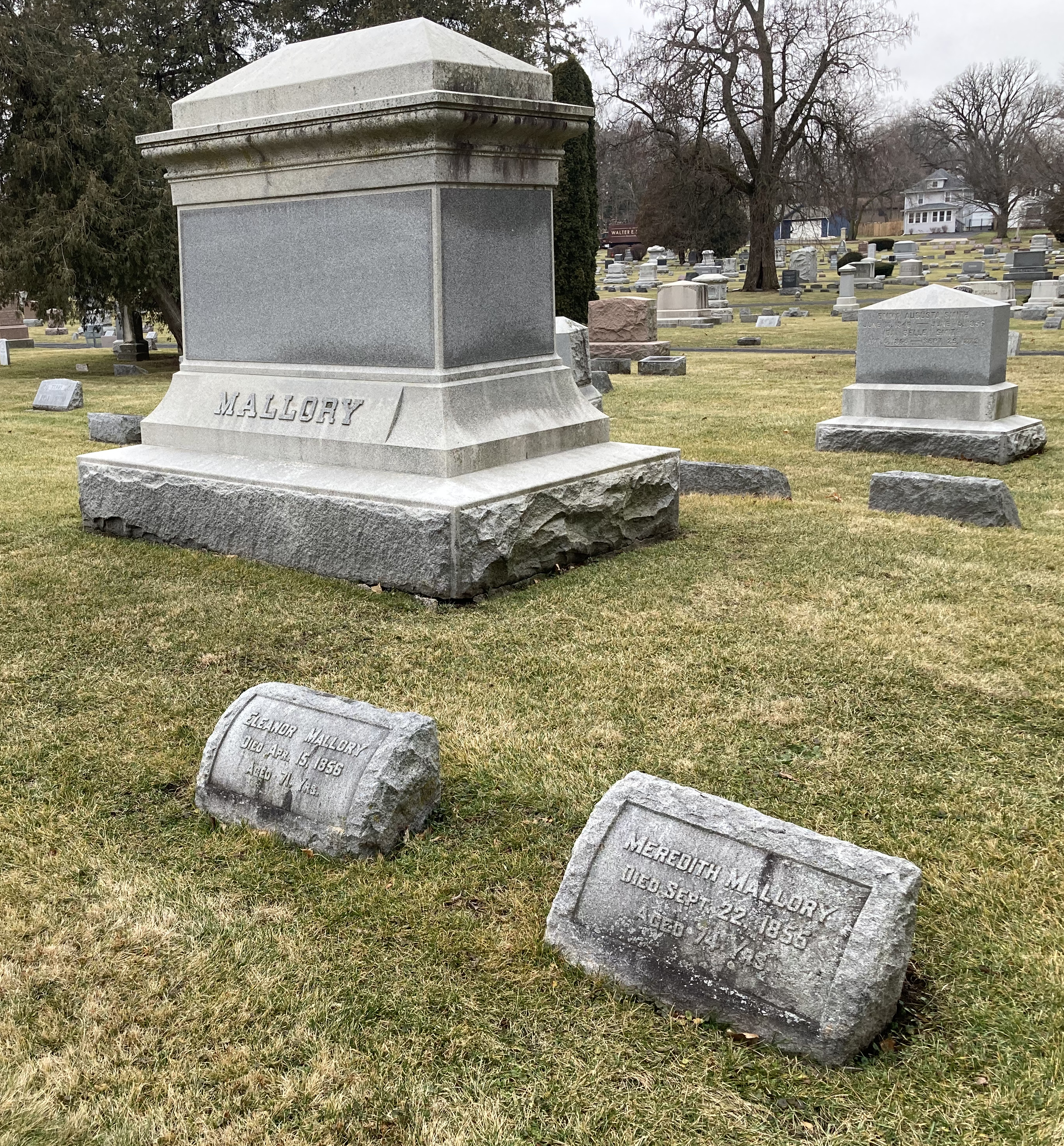
Mallory's grave at West Batavia Cemetery

He was not a candidate for reelection and returned to his business ventures in Hammondsport. In the mid-1840s his finances became overextended and his mills and other properties were sold to satisfy his debts.

He later moved to Batavia, Illinois, which was then a village, where he was a partner with his son in law in a dam, mills, machine shops and farms. He also served as a member of Batavia Township's Town Council.

=== Death ===
Mallory died in Batavia on September 22, 1855. He was buried in West Batavia Cemetery.

== Sources ==
- United States Congress. "Meredith Mallory (id: M000081)". Biographical Directory of the United States Congress.

U.S. House of Representatives
Preceded by John T. Andrews	Member of the U.S. House of Representatives from New York's 27th congressional district March 4, 1839 – March 3, 1841	Succeeded by William M. Oliver
