= David Oliver Allen =

American missionary (1800–1863)

David Oliver Allen (1800–1863) was an American missionary to India and an author.

== Life ==
Allen was born in Barre, Massachusetts to Moses and Mahitable Allen. His father relocated the family to Princeton, Massachusetts while David Allen was an infant. He initially began collegiate studies at Williams College, but moved to Amherst College upon that institution's opening. He graduated from Amherst College in 1823 and spent a year teaching in Groton, Massachusetts. In 1824 he began study at Andover Theological Seminary and completed their course in 1827. He decided upon missionary work his final year, and was ordinated on May 21. Seven days later he was married to Myra Wood. Allen was called to Bombay, India as a missionary before he graduated as the situation there was deemed an emergency. He arrived in Bombay on November 27, 1827. His wife accompanied him, but she died on February 5, 1831. In 1844 he took charge of the Bombay printing establishment. He wrote tracts in "Mahratta," (Marathi language) and supervised a new translation of the Bible into that language. Weakened by the Indian climate, he returned to America in 1853.

Allen's mission in Bombay was to translate scripture to their native Mahratta language. While in Bombay he served the community as well as provided employment for over 100 people. Allen was extremely dedicated to spreading the Christian religion to those who he felt could benefit. His work helped bridge cultural and linguistic divides. Allen was eventually called back home due to health reasons in June, 1853, but not before he could make a lasting impact and complete his mission.

Allen's biggest achievement might have been transferring the scripture of the bible to the Mahratta language, but as a missionary he also preached the word of the bible such as love for god and giving to community or charity. Allen was also an established member of both the "Royal Asiatic Society" and the "American Oriental Society.' In these groups he continued to work with others on his lifelong mission of spreading the message of the bible.

His History of India was published at Boston in 1856. The full title of this book is "India Ancient and Modern. Geographical, Historical, Political, Social, and Religious; with a particular account of the state and prospects of Christianity."
