= Philip A. Goodwin =

American politician

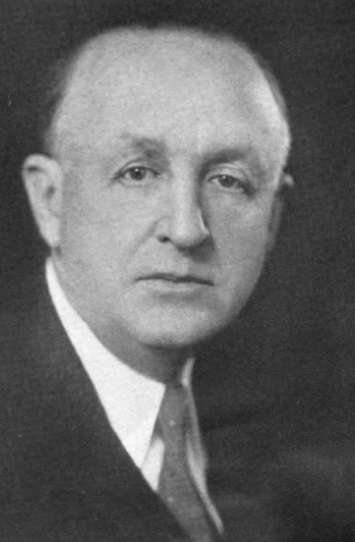
Philip A. Goodwin, Congressman from New York

Philip Arnold Goodwin (January 20, 1882 – June 6, 1937) was a Republican member of the United States House of Representatives from New York.

Goodwin was born in Athens, New York. He was in the steel bridge construction business in Albany, New York from 1902 until 1916. From 1916 until his death he owned and operated a lumber business in Coxsackie, New York. He was elected to Congress in 1932 and represented New York's 27th congressional district from March 4, 1933, until his death in Coxsackie, New York. Goodwin, 65 at the time of his death, had had a heart attack in the course of his campaign for re-election in 1936, and died of a second heart attack at this home in Coxsackie on June 6, 1937.

== See also ==
- List of members of the United States Congress who died in office (1900–1949)

== Sources ==
- United States Congress. "Philip A. Goodwin (id: G000302)". Biographical Directory of the United States Congress.

U.S. House of Representatives
Preceded by Harcourt J. Pratt	Member of the U.S. House of Representatives from New York's 27th congressional district 1933–1937	Succeeded by Lewis K. Rockefeller
