= Jay Le Fevre =

American politician

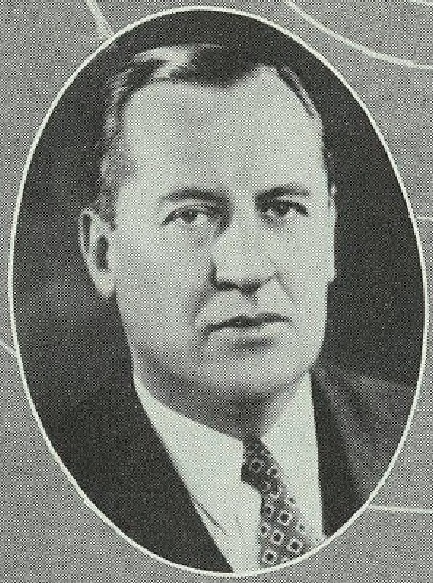

Member of the U.S. House of Representatives from New York
- In office January 3, 1943 – January 3, 1951
- Preceded by: Lewis K. Rockefeller (27th); Bernard W. Kearney (30th)
- Succeeded by: Ralph W. Gwinn (27th); J. Ernest Wharton (30th)
- Constituency: 27th district (1943-45); 30th district (1945-51)

Personal details
- Born: September 6, 1893 New Paltz, New York, U.S.
- Died: April 26, 1970 (aged 76) Kingston, New York, U.S.
- Resting place: Lloyd Cemetery, Highland, New York, U.S.
- Party: Republican
- Spouse: Mildred B. Hiltebrant (1920)
- Children: 3
- Military career
- Service: United States Army
- Service years: 1918
- Rank: Private
- Service number: 4,742,123
- Units: Casual Company, Camp Zachary Taylor
- Wars: World War I
- Education: Dartmouth College
- Occupation: Businessman

Jay Le Fevre (Note: Sometimes spelled "LeFevre".) (September 6, 1893 – April 26, 1970) was a United States representative from New York.

== Early life ==
Jay Le Fevre was born in New Paltz, New York on September 6, 1893, the son of Abram P. Le Fevre and Mary Emma (Van Derlyn) Le Fevre. He graduated from the Lawrenceville School in 1914, then began attendance at Dartmouth College. While at Dartmouth, he joined the Alpha Delta Phi fraternity. Le Fevre left college in 1916 and joined his father's coal, lumber, animal feed, and fuel oil business in New Paltz.

== Military service ==
In September 1918, Le Fevre enlisted for World War I, and joined the United States Army as a private. His application for a commission was approved, and he was assigned to the Field Artillery branch Officer Training School at Camp Zachary Taylor, Kentucky. He was still undergoing training as a member of the camp's Casual Company when the Armistice of November 11, 1918 ended the war. (Note: Some sources indicate that Le Fevre was a second lieutenant, but the abstract of his service indicates that he had not received his commission by the time he was discharged.) Le Fevre received his discharge in December 1918, and afterwards was a longtime member of the American Legion.

== Business career ==
Le Fevre continued with A. P. Le Fevre and Son, eventually becoming the company's president. He was also a longtime trustee of the New Paltz Savings Bank and a director of the Huguenot Branch of the State of New York National Bank. In addition, he was a longtime director of the Northeast Retail Lumbermen's Association and served as its president.

== Civic and political career ==
Le Fevre was a longtime member of the board of visitors of the State Normal School in New Paltz, now the State University of New York at New Paltz. He also belonged to the Holland Society of New York and the New Paltz Dutch Reformed Church, of which he was a longtime consistory member. In addition, Le Fevre served as a director of the Huguenot Historical Society.

A Republican in politics, Le Fevre served as a New Paltz village trustee and was a delegate to the Republican state conventions of 1942 and 1946. In addition, he was a member of the New Paltz Republican Committee from 1930 to 1946.

=== Congressman ===
In 1942, Le Fevre was elected to the United States House of Representatives. He was reelected three times and served from January 3, 1943 to January 3, 1951. While in Congress, Le Fevre was a member of the special committee that toured Europe in 1946 to develop recommendations for the continent's post-World War II economic development. In addition, he was one of the U.S. House Interior Committee members who visited Hawaii, then recommended to the House that the territory be admitted to the Union.

== Later life ==
Le Fevre was not a candidate for renomination in 1950 and returned to his business interests. In 1951, he was appointed to the New York State Bridge Authority, and he served until 1955.

== Death and burial ==
LeFevre died in Kingston, New York on April 26, 1970. He was buried at Lloyd Cemetery in Highland, New York.

== Family ==
In January 1920, Le Fevre married Mildred B. Hiltebrant, and they remained married until his death. They were the parents of three children.

Le Fevre was a descendant of the LeFevres who founded New Paltz in 1678. The LeFevres were Huguenots, Protestant followers of John Calvin who fled what is today Northern France and South Belgium who fled persecution by the ruling Catholics. The original settlement of their ancestors survives today as Historic Huguenot Street, a National Historic Landmark District.

== Notes ==
U.S. House of Representatives
Preceded by Lewis K. Rockefeller	Member of the U.S. House of Representatives from New York's 27th congressional district 1943–1945	Succeeded by Ralph W. Gwinn
Preceded by Bernard W. Kearney	Member of the U.S. House of Representatives from New York's 30th congressional district 1945–1951	Succeeded by J. Ernest Wharton
