= Edward Howell (politician) =

American politician (1792–1871)

Edward Howell (October 16, 1792 – January 30, 1871) was an American educator, lawyer, and politician who served one term as a U.S. representative from New York state from 1833 to 1835.

== Biography ==
Born in Newburgh, New York, Howell attended the public schools. He moved to Sidney, New York, in 1808, and in the following year to Unadilla, New York, where he taught school. He moved to Bath, New York, in 1811.

He was appointed postmaster of Bath December 30, 1817, and served until August 13, 1821. County clerk of Steuben County in 1818–1821. He studied law. He was admitted to the bar in 1823 and commenced practice in Bath.

== Political career ==
He served as district attorney of Steuben County in 1829–1834. He served as member of the State assembly in 1832.

=== Congress ===
Howell was elected as a Jacksonian to the Twenty-third Congress (March 4, 1833 – March 3, 1835). He was not a candidate for renomination in 1834.

== Later career and death ==
He served as again district attorney of Steuben County in 1836–1840. He resumed the practice of law.

He died in Bath, New York, January 30, 1871. He was interred in Grove Cemetery.

== Sources ==
- United States Congress. "Edward Howell (id: H000860)". Biographical Directory of the United States Congress.

U.S. House of Representatives
Preceded by Frederick Whittlesey	Member of the U.S. House of Representatives from New York's 26th congressional district 1833–1835	Succeeded by Joshua Lee
