= Luther Rice =

American Baptist minister (1783–1836)

The Reverend Luther Rice
- Luther Rice Silhouette ca1830
- Born: March 25, 1783; Northborough, Massachusetts, U.S.
- Died: September 27, 1836 (aged 53); Edgefield, South Carolina, U.S.
- Education: Williams College

Luther Rice (March 25, 1783 – September 27, 1836) was an American Baptist minister who, after a thwarted mission to India, returned to America where he spent the remainder of his career raising funds for missions and advocating for the formation of a unified Baptist missionary-sending body, which culminated in establishment of the Baptist Triennial Convention (which later split with the formation of the Southern Baptist Convention). He was instrumental in the raising of funds towards the establishment of Columbian College (now George Washington University) in Washington, D.C., later serving the college in the capacity of treasurer.

== Early life and education ==
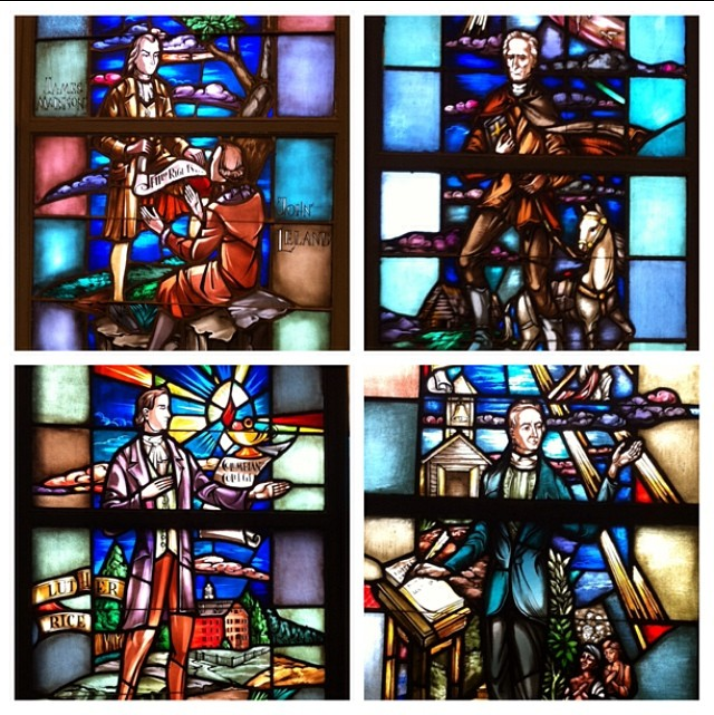
Figures from U.S. Baptist history in the stained glass windows of National Baptist Memorial Church, Washington, D.C. Clockwise from top left: James Madison, John Leland, John Mason Peck, Adoniram Judson, Luther Rice

Rice was born March 25, 1783, in Northborough, Massachusetts, to Amos Rice and Sarah (Graves) Rice.

As a young man at Williams College, Rice became part of a group of young ministers and aspiring missionaries who called themselves "the Brethren." The group became famous for the "Haystack Prayer Meeting," although Rice was not present that day. In February 1812, he sailed to Calcutta, India with Adoniram Judson as a Congregationalist missionary and met with English Baptist missionary William Carey. Both Rice and Judson became Baptists, and Rice returned to America to break ties with the Congregationalists and to raise support for Judson's work from the Baptists.

== Career ==
Rice worked to unite Baptists in America to support foreign missionaries which resulted in the organization of "The General Missionary Convention of the Baptist Denomination in United States of America, for Foreign Missions," also called the Triennial Convention, in 1814. Also in 1814, Rice was awarded an honorary doctorate by then Baptist-dominated Brown University in partial recognition for his contributions to missionary work undertaken through his Baptist denomination. He spent the rest of his life garnering support for missionaries and Baptist work, traveling across America by horseback to raise funds and awareness for Baptist missions.

Rice also founded Columbian College in 1821, the original unit of present-day George Washington University, in Washington, D.C. He served as the treasurer of Columbian College from 1826 until his death, September 25, 1836, in Saluda, South Carolina, while traveling through the Southern United States raising funds for the missions and seminaries that he founded. He was interred at Pine Pleasant Cemetery, Saluda County, South Carolina.

Although his life was not without controversy, Rice's contribution to the support of missionary work was invaluable in the early years of the Triennial Convention. During Rice's lifetime, the Triennial Convention's membership grew from 8,000 to 600,000, and the convention supported 25 missions and 112 missionaries. By the time of his death, 15 Baptist universities and colleges had been formed. Luther Rice College & Seminary founded in 1962 and located in Lithonia, Georgia, USA, was named after Luther Rice in recognition of his work in the Baptist missions and seminary education.

== Genealogy ==
Luther Rice was a direct descendant of Edmund Rice, an English immigrant to Massachusetts Bay Colony, as follows:

- Luther Rice, son of
- Amos Rice (1743 – 1827), son of
- Jacob Rice (1707 – 1788), son of

- Jacob Rice (1660 – 1746), son of
- Edward Rice (1622 – 1712), son of

- Edmund Rice (1594 – 1663)
