= National Baptist Memorial Church =

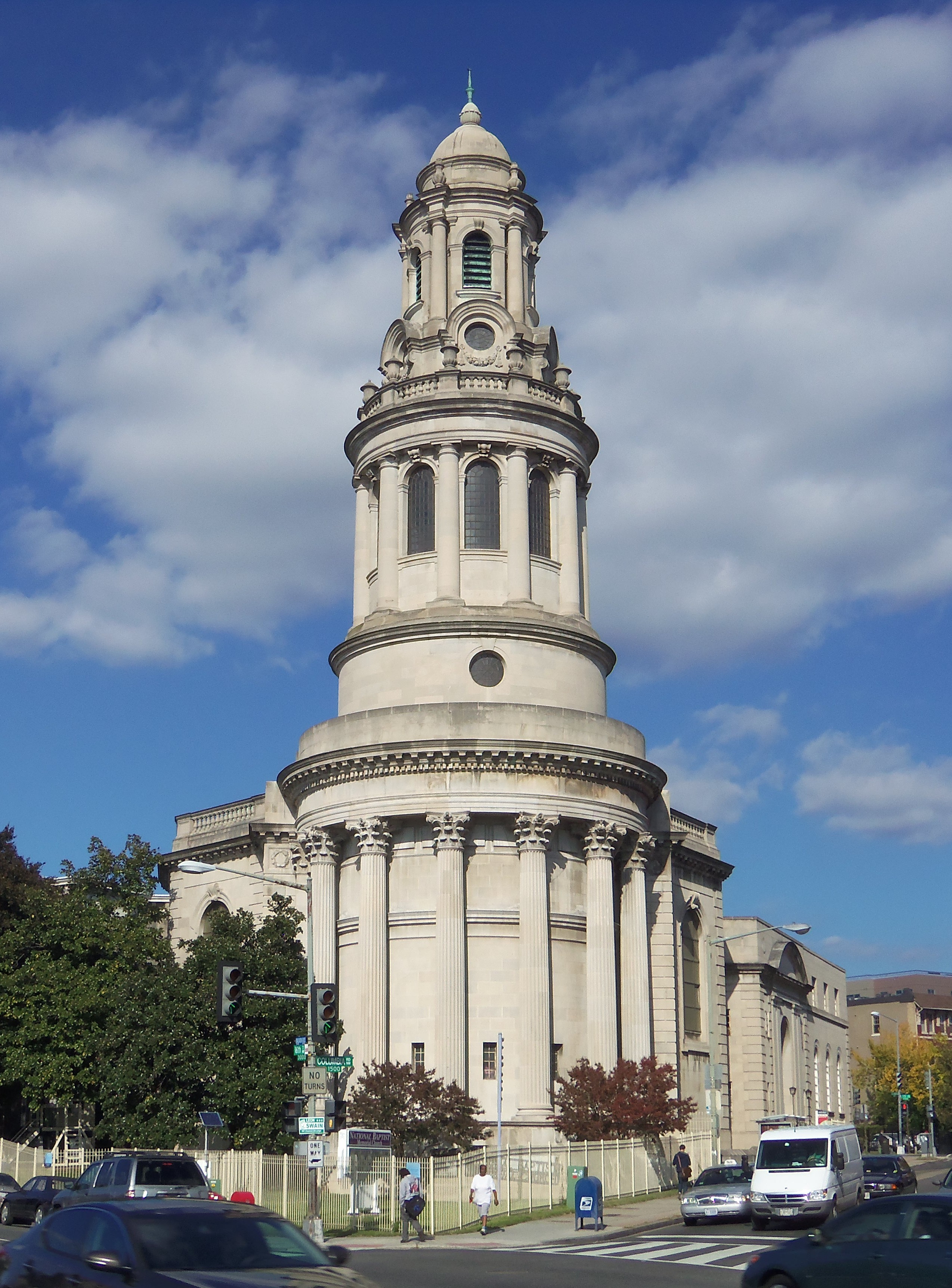

- Location within District of Columbia
- 38°55′37.0302″N 77°2′9.6972″W
- Location: 1501 Columbia Road NW; Washington, D.C. 20009
- Country: United States
- Denomination: Baptist
- Website: nbmchurchdc.org

History
- Former name: Immanuel Baptist Church

Architecture
- Architect: Egerton Swartwout
- Groundbreaking: 23 April 1921

National Baptist Memorial Church is a Baptist church in Washington, D.C. It is located at the intersection of 16th Street NW and Columbia Road, where the Mt. Pleasant, Columbia Heights and Adams Morgan neighborhoods meet. The crossroads is notable for the triple steeples of National Baptist Memorial Church, All Souls Unitarian Church and the Unification Church's cathedral (formerly the Mormon's Washington Chapel).

It is affiliated with the American Baptist Churches USA, the Progressive National Baptist Convention. Rev. Kasey D. Jones became the senior pastor in 2006 and served until 2017. She was the first woman and the first African-American to serve in that role. Rev. Dr. Charles E. Collins Jr. served as the interim pastor from September 3, 2017, to February 27, 2022. Following her tenure, Rev. Dr. Lisa Banks-Williams was officially called to serve as Interim Pastor on February 13, 2023, and was elected as Senior Pastor on June 23, 2024.

== History ==
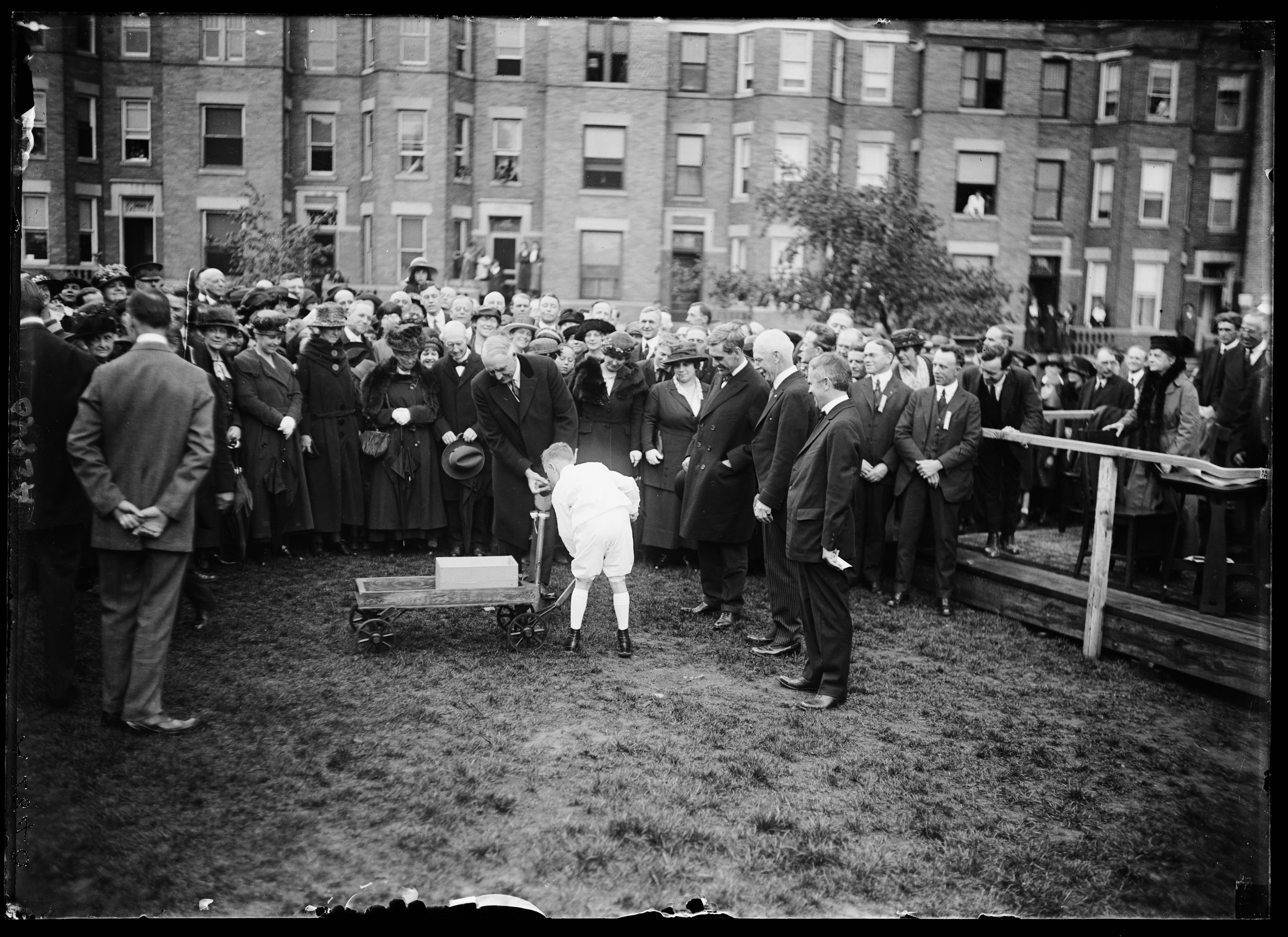
Gove Griffith Johnson Jr., the eight-year-old son of Rev. Gove Griffith Johnson, received the first scoop of earth from President Warren G. Harding at the groundbreaking of National Baptist Memorial Church, 23 April 1921, Library of Congress, Harris & Ewing Collection

For many years there had been discussion at meetings of the Columbia Association of Baptist Churches of organizing a Bible School at the Mount Pleasant Field. At an association meeting held at Calvary Baptist Church in 1901 Percy S. Foster offered his house at the corner of Columbia Road and 13th Street NW for a Sunday school and meeting place during his 1902–1903 term as Association moderator.

Metropolitan Baptist Church maintained a mission Sunday School at Scheutzen Park (earlier spelled Schutzen). Scheutzen Park fronted 7th Street NW (today's Georgia Avenue), between Harvard and Kenyon Streets. Metropolitan Baptist member Mrs. Rosella E. Bryant suggested that the location was too far for the children of 14th Street and that a new Sunday school should be organized there. At the suggestion of Captain Fred Beall, Charles Warner began investigation what could be done to organize a Sunday school at 14th Street.

The first meeting was held at the Post Office hall on Sunday, 7 January 1906.

=== Immanuel Baptist Church ===
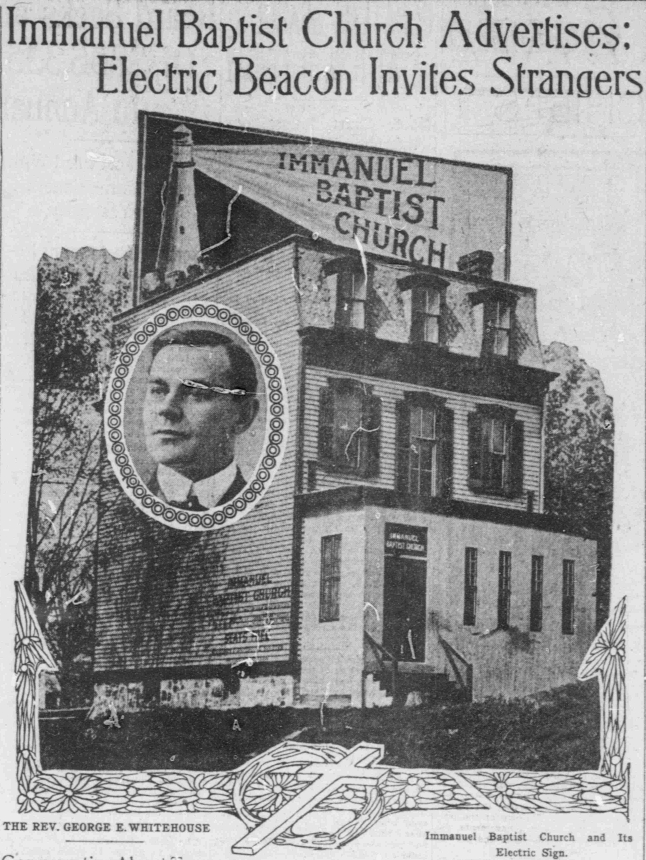
Immanuel Baptist Church, the precursor to National Baptist Memorial Church at the corner of 16th Street and Columbia NW, erects an electric light billboard. "But right here in Washington, Immanuel Baptist Church, in Mt. Pleasant, is a conspicuous example of what may be done with the electric sign. The church being situated at a prominent corner, it occurred to J. H. W. Marriott, the financial secretary, to suggest that all modern methods of advertising be adopted, and as a result a large electric sign sixteen feet long by seven feet high has recently been erected upon the roof."

By January 1907 the congregation had outgrown Post Office Hall. A lot at the corner of 16th Street NW and Columbia Road NW was purchased in 1907 for $30,000. The property included a house that was renovated to include a hall for services. Late that year financial secretary J. H. W. Marriott got the idea to erect a large, electrically illuminated billboard on the roof of the house (pictured left). The board made a plan to build a church building for $100,000 and a school for $40,000. Architect George W. Stone Sr. of Stone & Averill was commissioned to design the building to serve as Sunday school house. Stone produced a Neo-Gothic design.

=== National Baptist Memorial Church ===
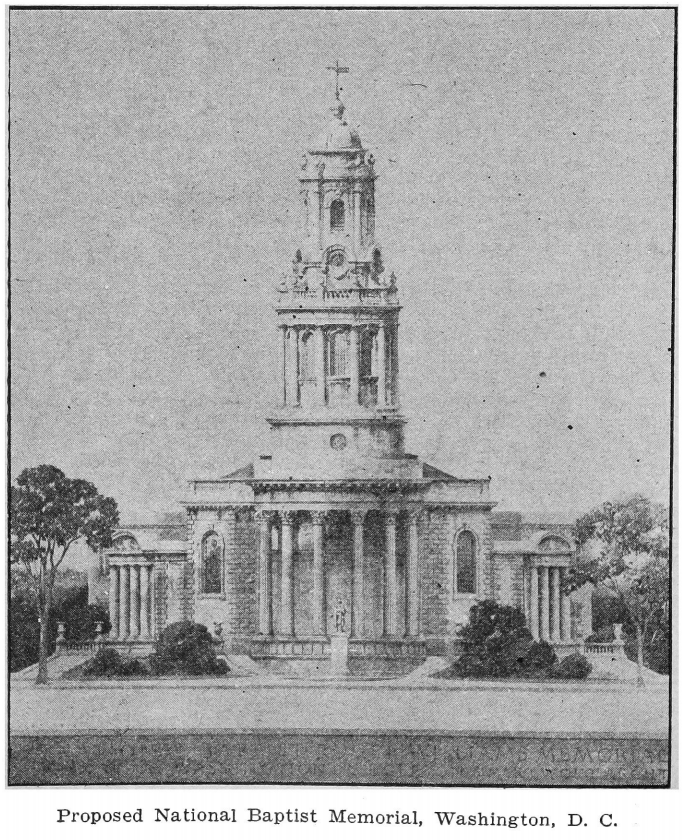
An illustration of the National Baptist Memorial as proposed in 1920

A movement for the creation of a national Baptist memorial in Washington, D.C. began in 1917. The original concept was as a memorial to Roger Williams and religious freedom. The design was to included a prominently placed statue of Williams (see illustration). In 1919 both the Northern and Southern Baptist Conventions agreed to add $175,000 each for the memorial in their five-year plans. The Washington area was to contribute another $100,000, with Immanuel Baptist Church pledging to raise $50,000 of the Washington contribution from within the church.

The Southern Baptist Convention 1920 Annual Meeting was held 12–17 May in Washington, D.C. and the sight was dedicated Saturday, 15 May of the convention. Two thousand people attended the dedication. Speakers included Secretary of the Navy Josephus Daniels, Rev. James Bruton Gambrell, President of the Southern Baptist Convention and William Joseph McGlothlin, President of Furman University.

The architect for the new church was Egerton Swartwout (1870–1943) from New York. The groundbreaking ceremony was held 23 April 1921. Rev. Johnson opened the ceremony and introduced Rev. E. B. Jackson, pastor of the First Baptist Church of Alexandria, Virginia, who was the chairman of the national building committee of Northern and Southern Baptists. They sang three stanzas of "America". A prayer was offered by Rev. J. J. Muir, chaplain of the House of Representatives. Then President Harding broke ground. Gove Griffith Johnson Jr., the eight-year-old son of Rev. Gove Griffith Johnson pulled the wagon that received the scoop of the first ground (see image to the right). The ceremony was attended by four lineal descendants of Roger Williams.

The Society of Architectural Historians Archipedia speculates that Swartwout's design may have been inspired by All Souls Church, Langham Place, London (1824).

The education building on 15th Street was built in 1941. The entire complex was renovated in 1950.

It was added to the D.C. Inventory of Historic Sites on 8 November 1964 and is part of the Meridian Hill Historic District which was created in April–May 2014.

In 2025, the church partnered with The District Church in D.C. to restore the building's interior as a shared worship and community space for the two congregations. The facility had become infested with pigeons during the COVID-19 pandemic.

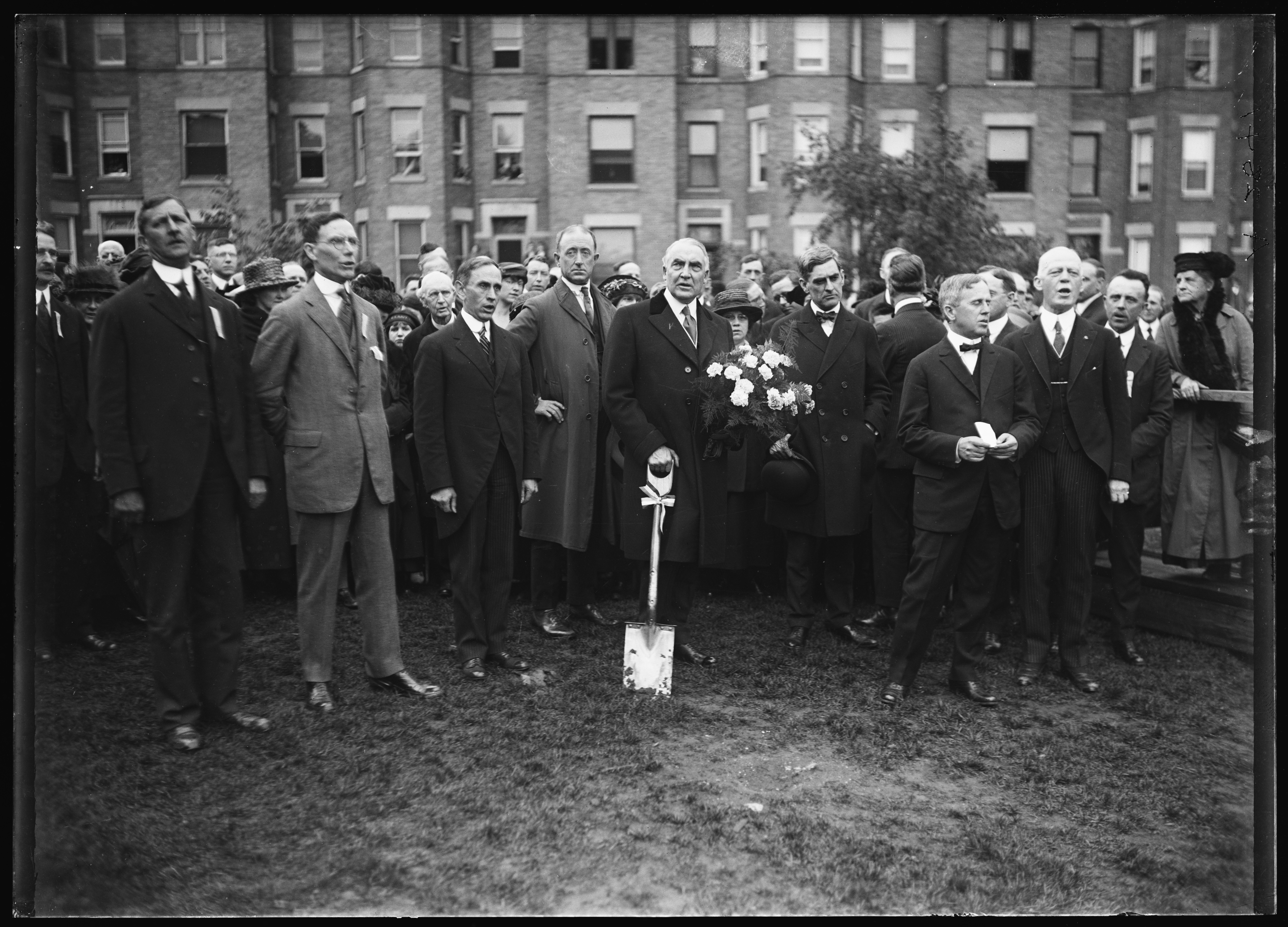
President Warren G. Harding at the groundbreaking of National Baptist Memorial Church, 23 April 1921, Library of Congress, Harris & Ewing Collection

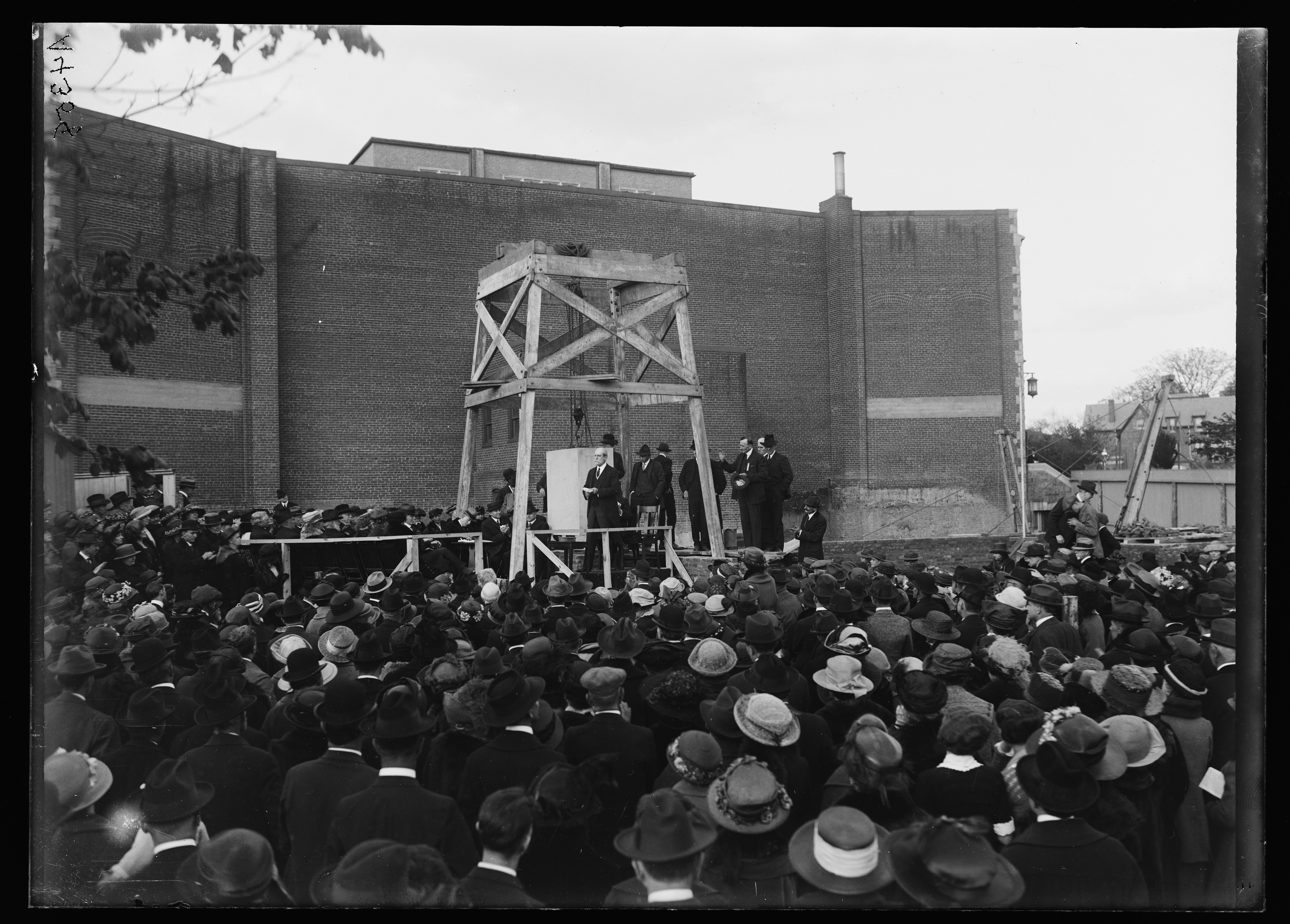
Secretary of State Charles Evans Hughes, cornerstone-laying ceremony for National Baptist Memorial Church, 22 April 1922, Library of Congress, Harris & Ewing Collection

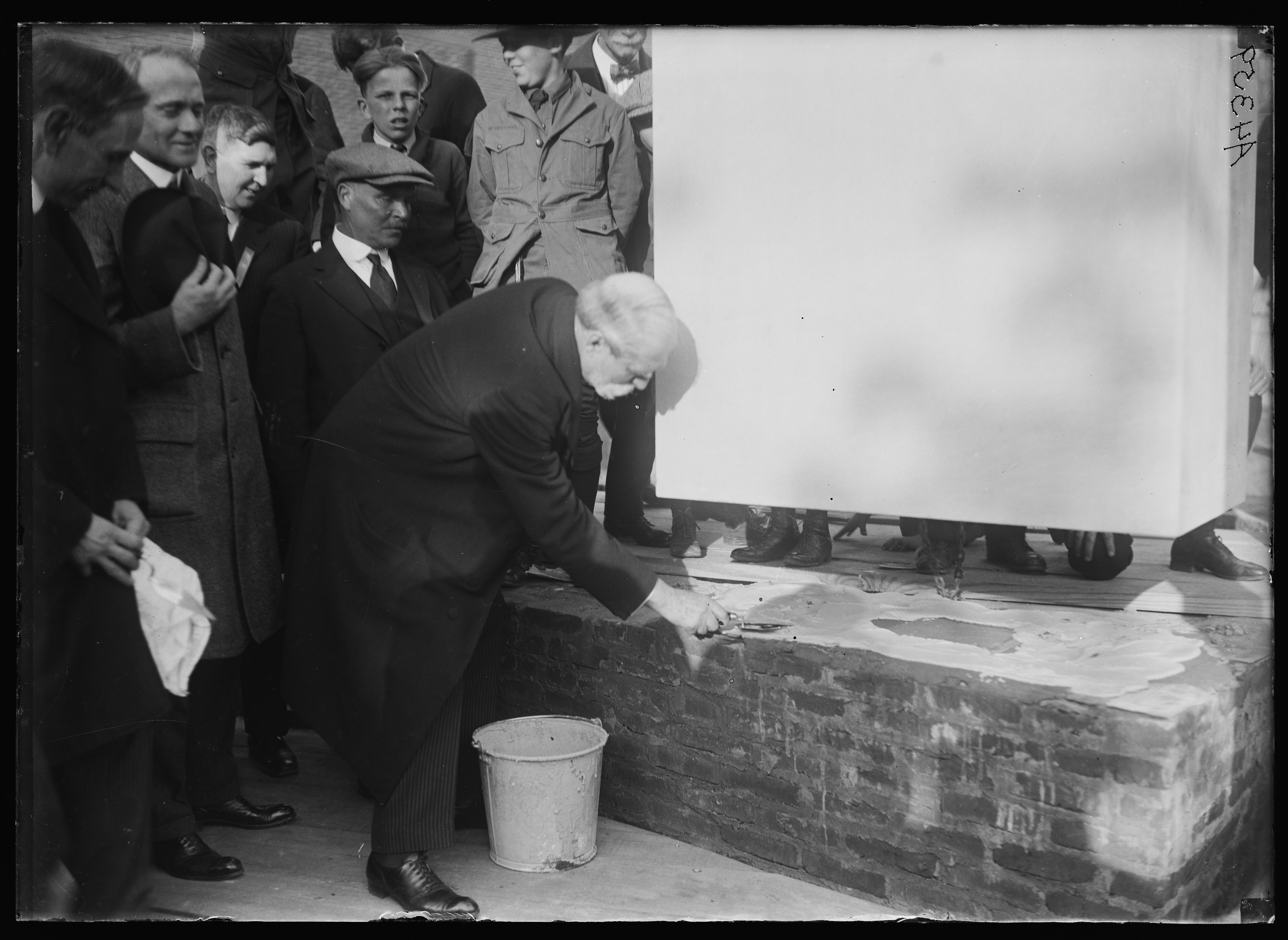
Secretary of State Charles Evans Hughes troweling mortar for the cornerstone of National Baptist Memorial Church, 22 April 1922, Library of Congress, Harris & Ewing Collection

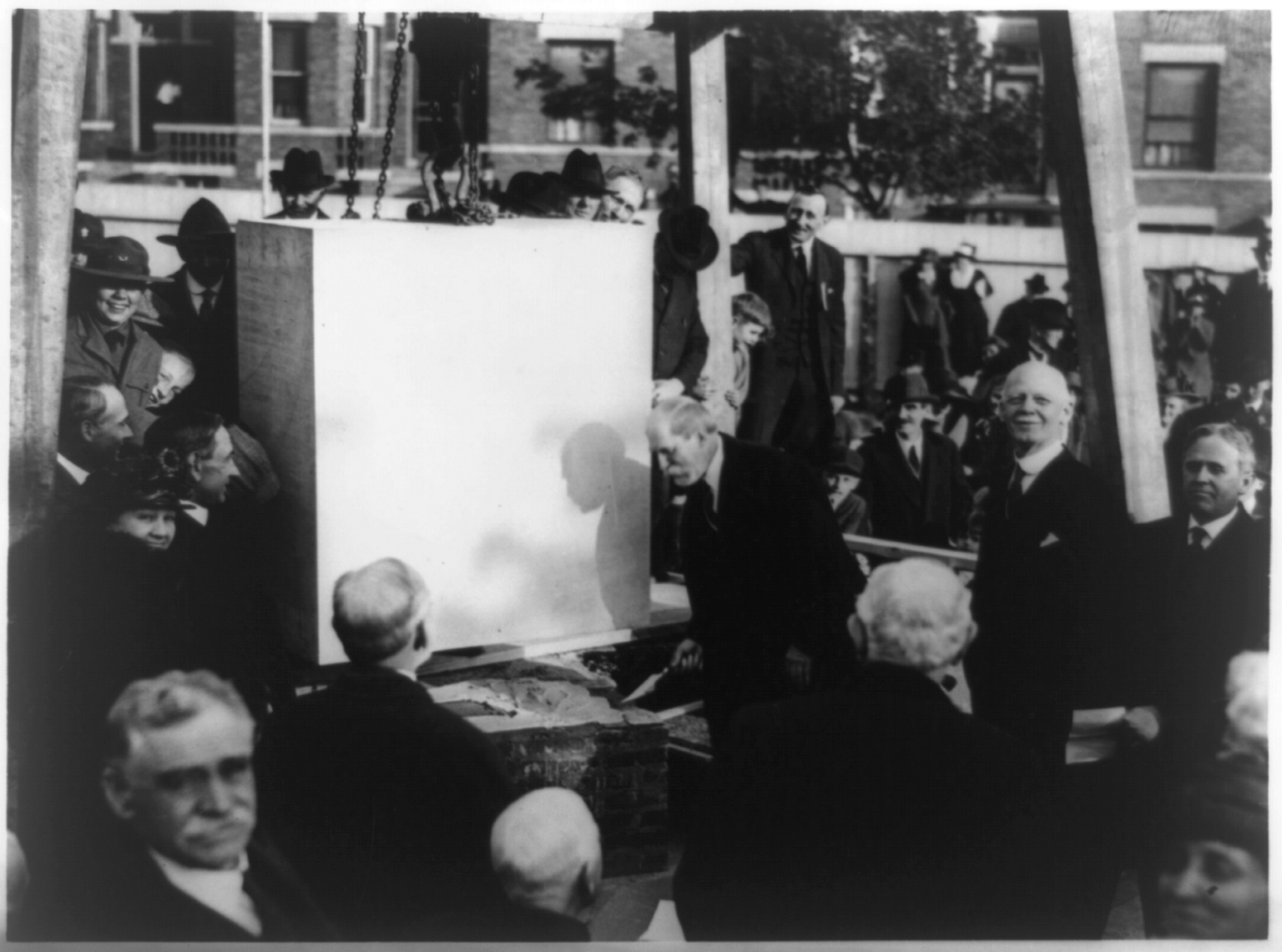
Charles Evans Hughes, toweling mortar for the cornerstone of National Baptist Memorial Church, 22 April 1922, Library of Congress, National Photo Company Collection
