= Samuel John Mills =

Samuel John Mills Jr. (April 12, 1783 – June 16, 1818) was an American Congregationalist preacher and missionary from Connecticut. He is known for contributing to the organization of the American Board of Commissioners for Foreign Missions and to the formation of the American Colonization Society in 1817. The latter was intended to establish a colony in West Africa as a destination for free American blacks.

== Biography ==
Samuel John Mills, Jr. was born in 1783 at Torringford (now part of Torrington), Connecticut, where his father Samuel John Mills (1768–1833) was a Congregational minister; his mother Esther Robbins was a homemaker and supported the ministry.

Mills attended Williams College in Massachusetts, where he organized a prayer group that held the Haystack prayer meeting. He entered Andover Theological Seminary in 1810, and was licensed to preach in 1812. While one of the group that helped form the American Board of Commissioners for Foreign Missions, Mills served as a missionary in the Mississippi valley. It was being newly settled by European Americans in the early 19th century, before Indian Removal.

Mills suggested the formation of a national Bible society as part of the evangelical effort in the South. In May 1816, thirty-five different bible societies met in New York and organized the American Bible Society. Mills also played a leading role in the formation of the American Colonization Society in 1817, along with Dr. Robert Finley, a clergyman from New Jersey who founded the National Colonization Society and died in 1817.

He sailed from Philadelphia on November 1, 1817. Following a brief stay in England, Mills sailed to the west coast of Africa to purchase land for the American Colonization Society. He embarked for the United States on May 22 and died at sea. His funeral on board was conducted by Ebenezer Burgess.

Mills's niece, Julia Sherman Mills (1817–1890) married missionary to Hawaii Samuel C. Damon (1815–1885). Their son Samuel Mills Damon (1841–1924) became a wealthy banker in Hawaii and was a beneficiary of the estate of Princess Bernice Pauahi Bishop for whom he was executor.
