= Niles and Sutherland Report =

The Niles and Sutherland Report, officially the Report of Captain Emory H. Niles and Mr. Arthur E. Sutherland Jr. on Trip of Investigation Through Eastern Turkish Vilayets, is the report requested by James L. Barton, Chairman of the American Committee for Relief in the Near East (ACRNE) when he gave Niles and Sutherland the assignment early summer 1919.

The purpose was to assess conditions in the former Ottoman Empire's eastern provinces in the aftermath of World War I, and suggest what aid was needed and whether it could be provided by the ACRNE.

Captain Emory H. Niles of the United States Army and Arthur E. Sutherland, Jr. toured the Anatolian area through often difficult terrain inaccessible by train or vehicle.

== Harbord Commission ==
Niles and Sutherland's inspection of Eastern Turkey preceded the larger and more expansive Harbord Commission led by General James Harbord. Harbord had been instructed to "investigate and report on the political, military, geographic, administrative, economic, and such other considerations involved in possible American interests and responsibilities in the region" and resulted in the 1920 ‘Report of the American Military Mission to Armenia’. Because Harbord's group did not travel to Bitlis and Van, their report relied on information provided in the 1919 ‘Niles and Sutherland Report’.

== The Niles Sutherland Expedition ==
From Aleppo, Niles and Sutherland traveled by rail to Mardin, arriving there on 3 July 1919, where they engaged Osman Ruhi, a Turkish medical student, as their interpreter. The journey to Bitlis and Van was done on horseback, accompanied by a guard of Turkish soldiers. Their itinerary included Van, the Lake Region, Erzurum, Erzincan, Karakilise, and Şebinkarahisar. Because of difficulties in transportation, war damage, lack of roads, automobiles, gasoline, and sickness, they had to make changes in the planned trip. In some areas where they saw no real war damage, such as between Erzincan and Şebinkarahisar, or where ACRNE was already active, such as Trabizond, they did not spend much time.

== City of Van ==
Arriving by horseback at the city of Van in the summer of 1919, they were the first outsiders to see Van since the end of World War I. Niles and Sutherland estimated that there were five thousand inhabitants in the city at the time, and close to one hundred thousand in the whole province. They reported that Van's Armenian population (which they stated was approximately a quarter of the city's pre-war population) was all but all gone. With only 700 Armenians left in the whole Van region, they had to be protected by the soldiers from the vengeance of the Muslims. They reported that almost all of the Muslims were refugees who had escaped the invading Russians and Armenians, then returned when the Russians pulled back. Their report claimed immense death and destruction at the hands of Armenians, and stated that the Muslim sections of Van and Bitlis were completely demolished while the rest, mostly Armenian neighborhoods were mostly intact.

In this respect the Niles and Sutherland Report contradicts other reports, including (1) the Harbord Report which found Armenian housing in other areas to be in ruins and (2) eyewitness accounts of the actual destruction during the siege of Van in 1915. The report claimed that two thirds of the pre-war Muslim population was no longer in Van after the war and that there were no shops, no schools and no markets or warehouses left; only two hospitals were kept open by the efforts of the governor. Much of the city had to be rebuilt.

== Timeline of rediscovery of report, notes and missing photographs ==
1990 Justin McCarthy reported that he had found a draft copy of the report among the documents of the Harbord Commission held in the Library of Congress, and that he believed it to be the only surviving copy, and that all other copies, including the originals of their interviews with locals, had been either lost or, more likely, destroyed.

2010 Historian, Brian Johnson, found the field notes of Niles and Sutherland in the archives of the former American Board of Commissioners for Foreign Missions (ABCFM) in Istanbul.

2016 The descendants of Arthur E Sutherland Jr., the Sutherland in the Niles and Sutherland Report found a draft of the report, copies of small and 11x14 sized photographs, and more materials to be catalogued.

2024 ARIT, the American Research Institute in Turkey, and the Orient-Institute Istanbul, a German organization, will be developing an online album, small book and exhibits. The photograph collection will be deeded to ARIT with related correspondence to further complete their records of Near East Relief's work in Turkey.
