= Angeles (name) =

List of notable individuals named Angeles

Notable people named Angeles include:

== Given name ==
- Ángeles Caso (born 1959), Spanish journalist, translator, and writer
- Angeles Mangaser Avecilla (1902–1975), Filipino social worker, missionary, and educator in Hawaii
- Ángeles Mastretta (born 1949), Mexican author and journalist
- Ángeles Montolio (born 1975), Spanish tennis player
- Ángeles González-Sinde (born 1965), Spanish scriptwriter, film director and previous Culture Minister of Spain
- Ángeles Balbiani (born 1982), Argentine actress
- Ángeles Parejo (born 1969), Spanish footballer
- Ángeles Santos Torroella (1911–2013), Catalan painter

== Surname ==
- Arturo Angeles (born 1953), American soccer referee
- Darwin Angeles (born 1968), Honduran boxer
- Felipe Ángeles (1868–1919), Mexican military officer
- Hero Angeles (born 1984), Filipino actor
- Jacobo Angeles (born 1973), Mexican artisan
- Jenzel Angeles (born 1995), Filipina actress and model
- Juanita Ángeles (1900–?), Filipina actress
- Marwin Angeles (born 1991), Italian-born Filipino footballer
- Pablo Ángeles David (1889–1965), Filipino politician
- Paulo Angeles (born 1997), Filipino actor, singer and dancer
- Rabin Angeles (born 2004), Filipino actor, model, singer and dancer
- Regine Angeles (born 1985), Filipina model and actress
- Rosalín Ángeles (born 1985), Dominican volleyball player
