= American Board of Commissioners for Foreign Missions =

1810–1957 American Christian missionary organisation

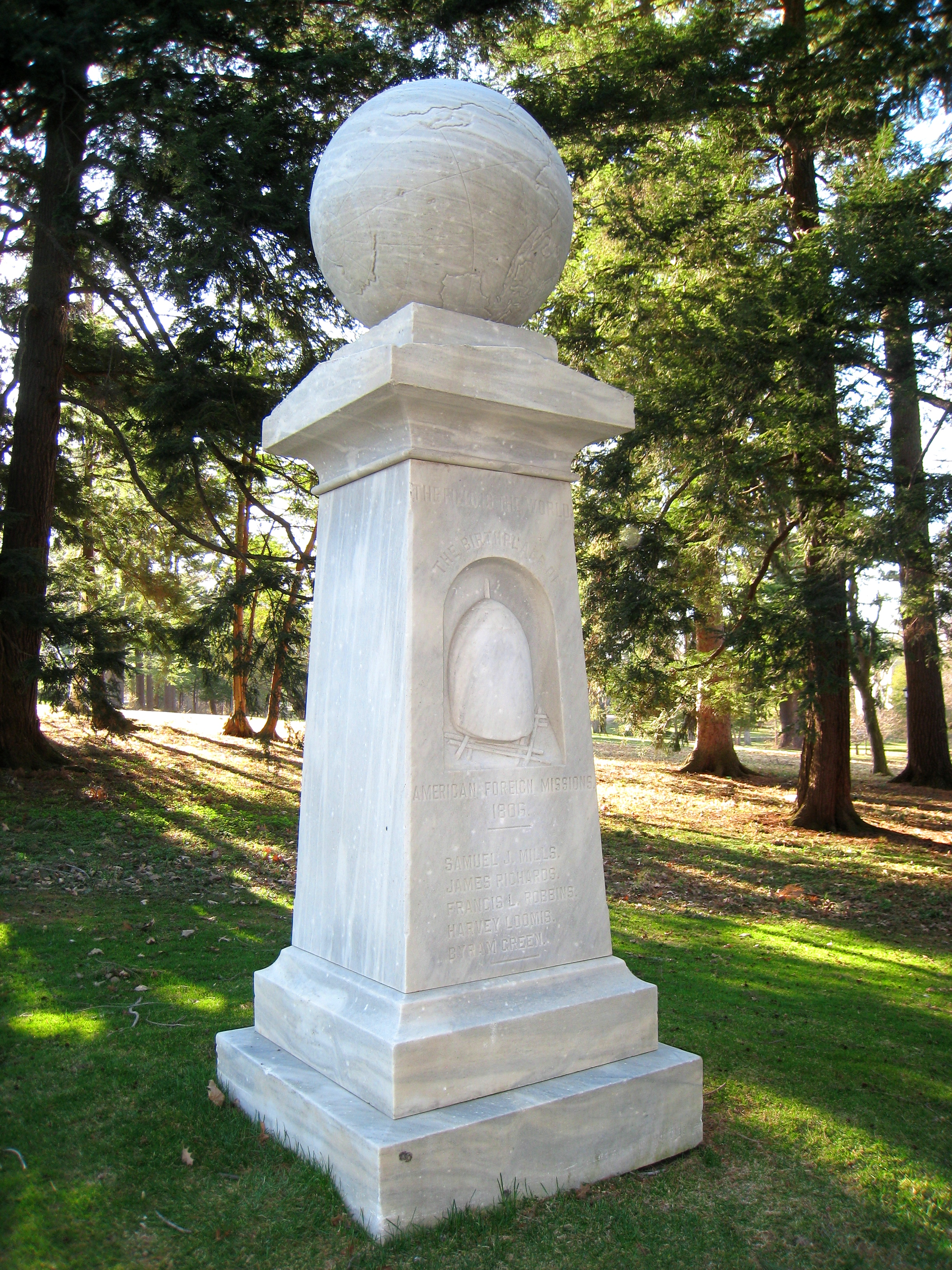
The Haystack Monument at Williams College in Williamstown, Massachusetts commemorates the event in 1806 that inspired the board's creation.

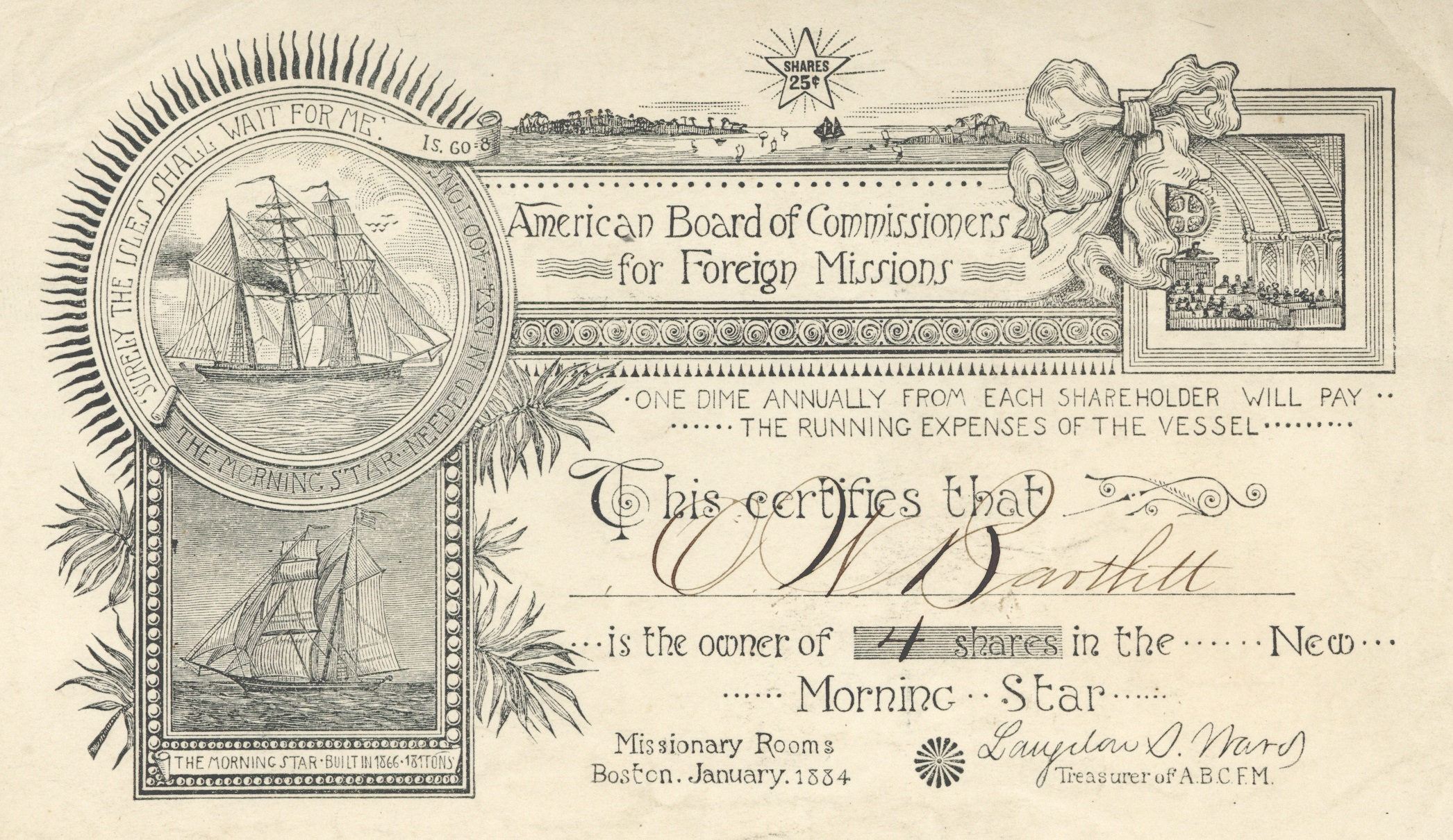
In 1884, the American Board of Commissioners for Foreign Missions issued shares to finance its ship Morning Star.

The American Board of Commissioners for Foreign Missions (ABCFM) was the first American Christian missionary organization. It was created in 1810 by recent graduates of Williams College. In the 19th century it was the largest and most important of American missionary organizations and consisted of participants from Protestant Reformed traditions such as Presbyterians, Congregationalists, and German Reformed churches.

Before 1870, the ABCFM consisted of Protestants of several denominations, including Congregationalists and Presbyterians. However, due to secessions caused by the issue of slavery and by the fact that New School Presbyterian-affiliated missionaries had begun to support the Presbyterian Board of Foreign Missions, after 1870 the ABCFM became a Congregationalist body.

The American Board (as it was frequently known) continued to operate as a largely Congregationalist entity until the 1950s. In 1957, the Congregational Christian church merged with the German Evangelical and Reformed Church to form the United Church of Christ. As a part of the organizational merger associated with this new denomination, the ABCFM ceased to be independent. In 1961, it merged operations with other missions organizations to form the United Church Board for World Ministries, an agency of the United Church of Christ. Organizations that draw inspiration from the ABCFM include InterVarsity Christian Fellowship, the Conservative Congregational Christian Conference, and the Missionary Society of the National Association of Congregational Christian Churches.

During the period of its existence from 1810 to 1961, the ABCFM sent almost 5,000 missionaries to 34 countries around the globe. It also sent missionaries to Christianize Indian tribes in North America.

== Organization and functioning ==
The ABCFM conducted an annual meeting with a Prudential Committee (aka Executive Committee) that took care of day-to-day business. It elected a Corresponding Secretary to produce written documents, and a Treasurer to receive donations. It also had board members.

The ABCFM held its first meeting on September 5, 1810, and elected Samuel Worcester as corresponding secretary.

=== Corresponding Secretaries and other key leaders ===
- Samuel Worcester was the first corresponding secretary, starting in 1810.
- Jeremiah Evarts, corresponding secretary of the ABCFM from 1821 to 1831
- At the 1822 annual meeting, board members elected officers: Evarts as corresponding secretary, John Treadwell as president, and Rev. Joseph Lyman as vice president. The Prudential Committee consisted of William Reed, Rev. Leonard Woods, Jeremiah Evarts, Samuel Hubbard, and Rev. Warren Fay.
- Elias Cornelius became corresponding secretary, serving Dec 1831 – February 1832 (his death)
- Benjamin B. Wisner, Rufus Anderson (1796–1880) and David Greene (1797–1866) became "coequal" secretaries in 1832. When Wisner died (February 9, 1835), William Jessup Armstrong took his place.
- Anderson, Greene, and Armstrong led as coequals from 1835 to 1846, with Anderson as foreign secretary, Armstrong as domestic secretary, and David Greene as secretary for American Indian missions and editor of the Missionary Herald Rufus Anderson continued as foreign secretary until 1866. Armstrong died in a shipwreck between Boston and New Jersey in 1846.
- Selah B. Treat was elected in 1843 as recording secretary. Rufus Anderson, Rev. David Greene, and Rev. William J. Armstrong were listed as "Secretaries for Correspondence." (President and vice president were listed respectively as Theodore Frelinghuysen LL. D. and Hon. Thomas S. Williams)
- By 1858, George Warren Wood was sole corresponding secretary, with Rev. Mark Hopkins as president and abolitionist William Jessup as vice-president. Hopkins had been the President of Williams College since 1836.
- By 1866, Rev. Nathan George Clark and Rev G. W. Wood had joined Rufus Anderson and Selah Treat as corresponding secretaries. Wood, as ABCFM Secretary in New York City, held his position from 1850 to 1871. Clark assumed the position of Foreign Secretary when Anderson left in 1866 and remained Foreign Secretary until 1894.

Note: After some secessions due to the slavery issue and the movement of New School Presbyterian-affiliated missionaries to the Presbyterian Board of Foreign Missions, the ABCFM was left as a Congregationalist body after 1870.

- In 1896, James Levi Barton became secretary when N.G. Clark died, and he retired in 1927.
- In 1899, James L. Barton, Judson Smith, and Charles H. Daniels are the three Corresponding Secretaries of the ABCFM according to The Congregational Yearbook. It also lists Charles M. Lamson and D. Willis James as ABCFM president and vice president, respectively.
- Henry H. Riggs' brother Ernest Wilson Riggs (former president of Euphrates College 1910–1921 and Near East Relief worker) joined James Levi Barton as associate secretary and corresponding secretary of the ABCFM from 1921 to 1932.

Note: After 1930, the ABCFM revised its constitution to create the position of "Executive Vice-President" to provide a position that was "first among equals" amongst ABCFM secretaries.

- Dr. Frank Field Goodsell was the first Executive Vice-president of the ABCFM, which he led from 1930 to 1948.
- Alford Carleton served as executive vice president of the board from 1954 to 1970.

Note: when the Evangelical and Reformed Church merged with the Congregational Christian Church in 1957, the Congregationalist-affiliated ABCFM merged with the E&R affiliated Board of International Missions to become the United Church of Christ denomination's United Church Board of World Ministries under Carleton On June 29, 1961, the ABCFM formally concluded. On July 1, 2000, a UCC restructure renamed UCBWM became "Wider Church Ministries" under the UCC's covenanted ministries structure.

=== Board members ===
- Timothy Dwight

In 1826, the American Board absorbed 26 members of the United Foreign Missionary Society (UFMS) into its board.

== Early history ==
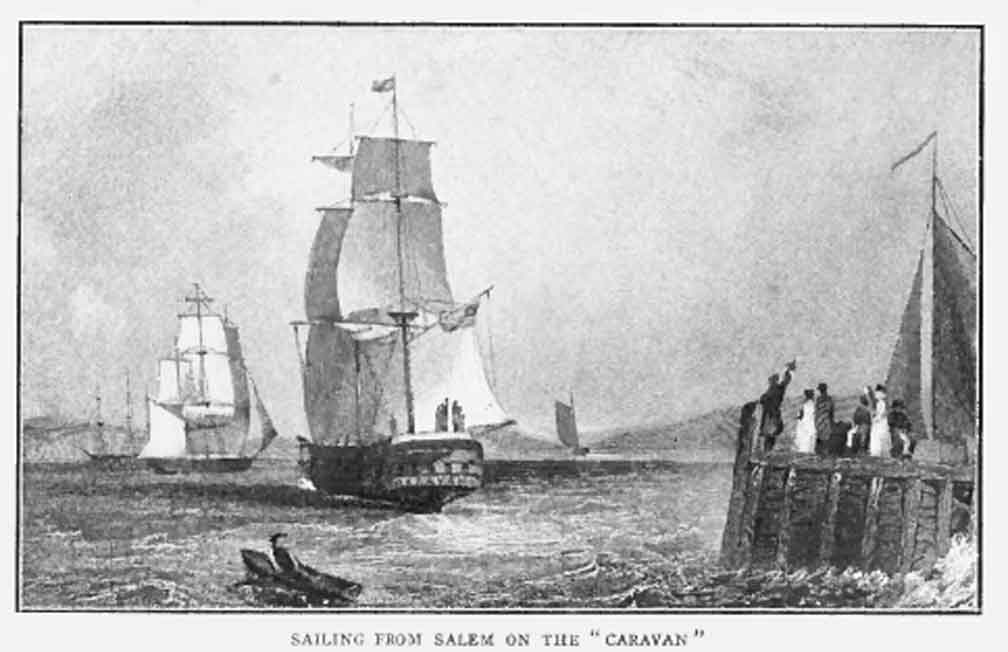
The Judsons, Newells, and Luther Rice set sail for India from Salem, Massachusetts on the Caravan on February 19, 1812.

In 1806, five students from Williams College in western Massachusetts took shelter from a thunderstorm in a haystack. At the Haystack Prayer Meeting, they came to the common conviction that "the field is the world" and inspired the creation of the ABCFM four years later. The objective of the ABCFM was to spread Christianity worldwide. Congregationalist in origin, the ABCFM also accepted missionaries from Presbyterian (1812–70), Dutch-Reformed (1819–57) and other denominations.

In 1812, the ABCFM sent its first missionaries – Adoniram and Ann Hasseltine Judson; Samuel and Roxana Peck Nott; Samuel and Harriet Newell; Gordon Hall, and Luther Rice—to British India. Between 1812 and 1840, they were followed by missionaries to the following people and places: Tennessee to the Cherokee Indians, India (the Bombay area), northern Ceylon (modern day Sri Lanka), the Sandwich Islands (Hawaii); east Asia: China, Singapore and Siam (Thailand); the Middle East: (Greece, Cyprus, Turkey, Syria, the Holy Land and Persia (Iran)); and Africa: Western Africa—Cape Palmas—and Southern Africa—among the Zulus.

=== The fight against Indian removal ===
Jeremiah Evarts served as treasurer, 1812–20, and as corresponding secretary from 1821 until his death in 1831. Under his leadership, the board in 1821 expanded the role of women: it authorized Ellen Stetson, the first unmarried female missionary to the American Indians, and Betsey Stockton, the first unmarried female overseas missionary and the first African-American missionary.

In 1826, the ABCFM merged with the United Foreign Mission Society, which had been formed in 1817 by members of Presbyterian and Reformed churches.

Evarts led the organization's efforts to place missionaries with American Indian tribes in the Southeastern United States. He also led the ABCFM's extensive fight against Indian removal policies in general and the Indian Removal Act of 1830 in particular.

=== 1830 through 1860 ===
By the 1830s, based on its experiences, the ABCFM prohibited unmarried people from entering the mission field. They required couples to have been engaged at least two months prior to setting sail. To help the missionaries find wives, they maintained a list of women who were "missionary-minded": "young, pious, educated, fit and reasonably good-looking." The policy against sending single women as missionaries was not strictly followed and was reversed in 1868. The secretary post was offered to Elias Cornelius in October 1831, but he became ill and died in February 1832. Rufus Anderson was the General Secretary of the Board from 1832 through the mid-1860s. His legacy included administrative gifts, setting of policy, visiting around the world, and chronicling the work of the ABCFM in books.

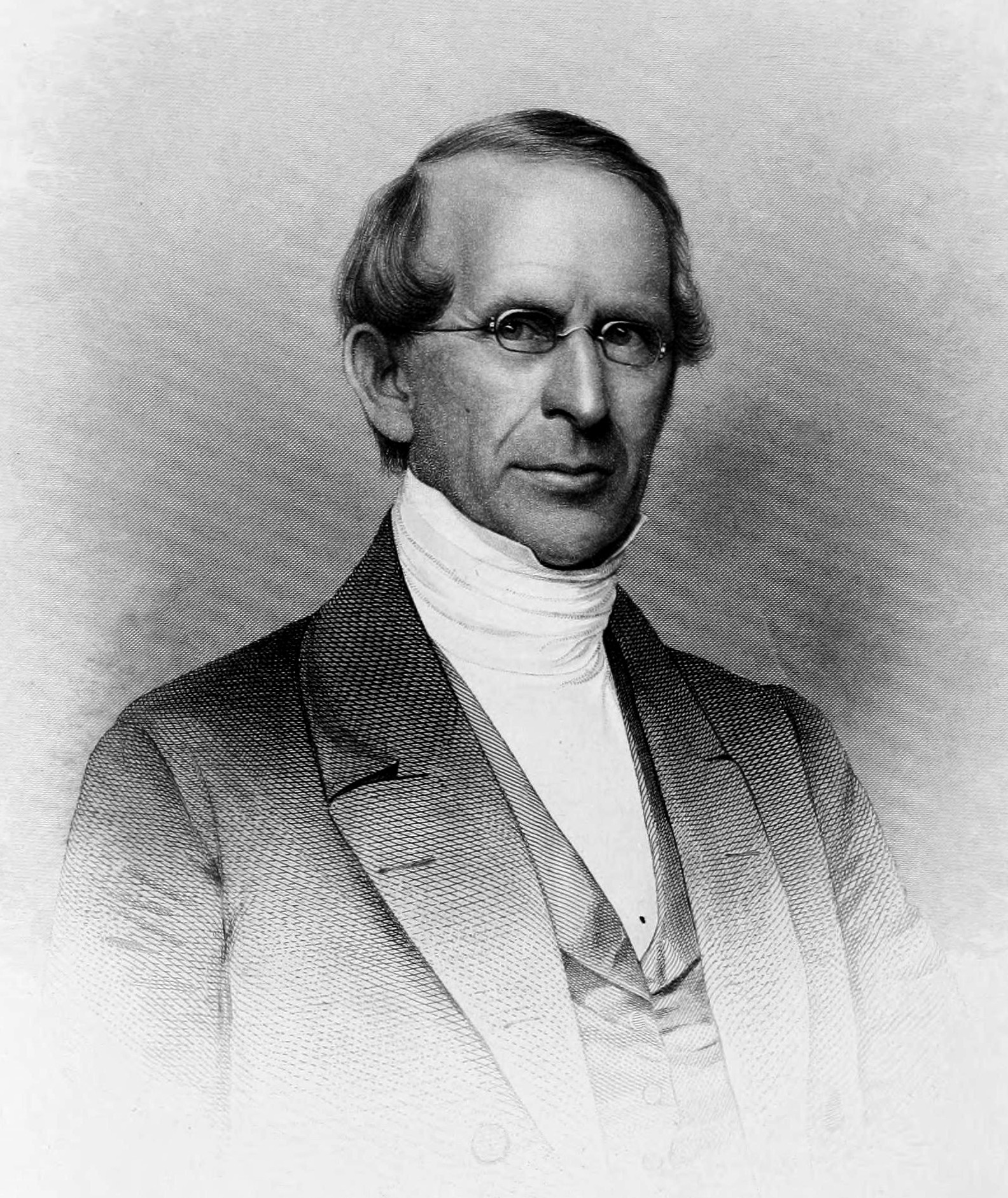
Rufus Anderson (1796–1880)

Between 1810 and 1840, the ABCFM sought firstly to proclaim the Gospel of Jesus Christ. At home and abroad, the Board and its supporters undertook every effort to exhort the evangelical community, to train a cadre of agents, and to send forth laborers into the mission field. As a leader in the United Front and early federal American voluntary associations, the Board influenced the nineteenth-century mission movement.

=== Missionary stations in 1855 ===
By 1850, the American Board had sent 157 ordained, male missionaries to foreign posts.

The January 1855 issue of the Missionary Herald listed the Current missions of the Board as follow:

==== Africa ====
- Mission to Gaboon (Baraka station, Olandebenk station, Negenenge station, one outstation at Nomba)
- Mission to Zulus (Mapumulo station, Umvoti station, Esidumbini station, Umsunduzi station, Itafamasi station, Table Mountain station, Inanda station, Umlazi station, Ifumi station, Amahlongwa station, Ifafa station, Umtwalumi station)
- Mission to Angola (Chilesso station)

==== Europe ====
- Mission to Greece (Athens station)
- Mission to Jews (Constantinople, Smyrna, Thessalonica)

==== Western Asia ====
- Mission to Armenians (Bebek (Constantinople) station, Pera (Constantinople) station, Hass-keuy (Constantinople) station, Koom-kapoo (Constantinople) station, Smyrna station, Marash station, Aintab station, Talas, Turkey station, Sivas station, Tokat station, Marsovan station, Trebizond station, Ezroom station, and Arabkir station)
- Mission to Syria (Beirut station, Abeih station, Hasbeiya station, Trablous station, Aleppo station, and outstations at Bhamdoun, Kfarshima, Rashaya, Ibel, and Khiam)
- Mission to Assyria (Mosul station, Diarbekir station, and an out-station at Hainee)
- Mission to Nestorians (Urmia station [also known as Oroomaih] and nearby Seir station; Gawar station; and outstations at Geog Tapa, Ardeshai, Supergan, and Dizza Takha)

==== Southern Asia ====
- Mission to Bombay (Bombay station)
- Mission to Ahmednagar (American Marathi Mission Marathi Christians) (Ahmednuggur station, Bhingar station, Seroor station, and outstations at Wudualey, Newasse, and Dedgaum)
- Mission to Satara (Satara station and Mahabulishwar station)
- Mission to Kolapoor (Kolapoor station)
- Mission to Madras ( Royapoorum station, Chintadrepettah station, and Black Town station)
- Mission to Madura (Madura East station, Madura Fort station, Dindiguel East station, Dindiguel West station, Periacoolum station, Tirumungalum station, Pasumalie station, Mandahasalie station, Tirupoovanum station, and Sivagunga station)
- Mission to Ceylon (Tillipally station, Baticotta station, Oodooville station, Manepy station, Panditeripo station, Chavagacherry station, Oodoopitty station, Varany station, and outstations at Caradive, Valany, Poongerdive, Kaits, and Atchoovaley

==== Eastern Asia ====
- Mission to Canton (Canton station)
- Mission to Amoy (Amoy station)
- Mission to Fuh-Chau (Fuzhou station)
- Mission to Shanghai (Shanghai station)
- Mission to Hong Kong/South China (Hong Kong and Canton stations)

==== North Pacific Ocean ====
- Mission to Micronesia (Rono Kittie station (Ascension Island), Shalong Point station (Ascension Island), Strong's Island station)
- Mission to Hawaii (Kailua station, Kealakekua station, Hilo station, Kohala station, and Waimea station)
- Mission to Maui (Lahaina station, Lahainaluna station, Wailuku station)
- Mission to Molokai (Kaluaaha station)
- Mission to Oahu (Honolulu station, Punahou station, Ewa station, Waialua station, and Kaneohe station)
- Mission to Kauai (Waimea station, Koloa station, and Waioli station)

==== North American Indians ====
- Mission to Choctaws (Stockbridge station, Wheelock station, Pine Ridge station, Good Water station, Good Land station, Bennington station, Mount Pleasant station, Lenox station, and outstations at Mount Zion and Bok Chito
- Mission to Cherokees (Brainerd Mission, Dwight station, Lee's Creek station, Fairfield station, Park Hill station, and an outstation at Honey Creek)
- Mission to Dakotas (Yellow Medicine station and New Hope station) Also Lake Harriet, Shakopee, Lac qui Parle stations.
- Mission to Ojibwas (Bad River station) (Also...[Leech Lake 1832-1843][LaPointe Mission 1830-1850] [Yellow Lake Mission 1833-1836] [Sandy Lake Mission 1832-1833] [Pokegama Mission 1836–1846 (on Snake River in Minnesota] [Red Lake Mission 1843–1848 in conjunction with Western Evangelical Mission Association] [Bad River/Odanah 1846-abt 1878; mission was taken over by Presbyterian Missions in 1870s])
- Mission to Senecas (Upper Cattaraugus station, Lower Cattaraugus station, Upper Alleghany station, Lower Alleghany station, and an outstation at Old Town)
- Mission to Tuscaroras (Tuscarora station and Mount Hope station)
- Mission to Abenaquis (St. Francis station)

=== Recruitment efforts ===
Orthodox, Trinitarian and evangelical in their theology, speakers to the annual meetings of the Board challenged their audiences to give of their time, talent and treasure in moving forward the global project of spreading Christianity. At first reflective of late colonial "occasional" sermons, the annual meeting addresses gradually took on the quality of "anniversary" sermons. The optimism and cooperation of post-millennialism held a major place in the scheme of the Board sermons.

After having listened to such sermons and been influenced at colleges, college and seminary students prepared to proclaim the gospel in foreign cultures. Their short dissertations and pre-departure sermons reflected both the outlook of annual Board sermons and sensitivity to host cultures. Once the missionaries entered the field, optimism remained yet was tempered by the realities of pioneering mission work in a different milieu. Many of the Board agents sought—through eclectic dialogue and opportunities as they presented themselves, as well as itinerant preaching—to bring the cultures they met, observed, and lived in to bear upon the message they shared. The missionaries found the audiences to be similar to Americans in their responses to the gospel message. Some rejected it outright, others accepted it, and a few became Christian proclaimers themselves.

=== Other North American Missions to the Indians ===
Among the North American missions of the ABCFM north or west of the displaced Southeast tribes were the 1823 Mackinaw Mission (Mackinac Island and Northern Michigan), the Green Bay mission (Michigan Territory at Green Bay), the Dakota mission (Michigan Territory/Iowa Territory/Minnesota Territory primarily along the Mississippi and the Minnesota (St. Peters) Rivers), the Ojibwe mission (Michigan Territory/Wisconsin Territory/Minnesota Territory/ Wisconsin at La Pointe and Odanah, Yellow Lake, Pokegama Lake, Sandy Lake, Fond du Lac, and Red Lake), and the Whitman mission in Oregon.

Missionaries of the Dakota mission experienced the explosion of Dakota violence in August 1862 at the start of the U.S.-Dakota War. Some of them attended the imprisoned Dakota and accompanied the exiled Dakota when they were forced out of Minnesota in 1863, especially those of the Williamson and Riggs families.

The Dakota mission translated the Bible into Dakota and produced a dictionary and a schoolbook. The Ojibwe mission translated the New Testament into Ojibwe and produced a number of schoolbooks, but used a now-abandoned notation style to do so. Both were among the first to render these languages in print.

=== Work with indigenous preachers ===
Indigenous preachers associated with the Board proclaimed an orthodox message, but they further modified the presentation beyond how the missionaries had developed subtle differences with the home leaders. Drawing upon the positive and negative aspects of their own cultures, the native evangelists steeped their messages in Biblical texts and themes. At times, indigenous workers had spectacular or unexpected results. On many occasions, little fruit resulted from their labors. Whatever the response, the native preachers worked on—even in the midst of persecution—until martyrdom or natural death took them.

Native preachers and other indigenous people assisted Board missionaries in Bible translation efforts. The act of translating the Scriptures into a mother tongue reflected a sensitivity to culture and a desire to work within the host society. Second only to the verbal proclamation of the Gospel, Bible translation took place in all sorts of settings: among ancient Christian churches, such as the Armenians and the Assyrian [Nestorian] church; cultures with a written language and a written religious heritage, such as the Marathi; and creating written languages in cultures without them, such as among the animistic people in Hawaii.

=== Educational, social, and medical roles served by ABCFM missionaries ===
Printing and literacy played crucial roles in the process of Bible translation. Similarly, the press runs and literacy presentations contributed significantly to the social involvement exhibited by the Board. To a greater or lesser extent, education, medicine, and social concerns supplemented the preaching efforts by missionaries. Schools provided ready-made audiences for preachers. Free, or Lancasterian, schools provided numerous students. Boarding students in missionary homes allowed them to witness Christian life in the intimacy of the family.

Education empowered indigenous people. Mostly later than 1840, it enabled them to develop their own church leaders and take a greater role in their communities. Board missionaries established some form of education at every station. A number of Board missionaries also received some medical training before leaving for the field. Some, like Ida Scudder, were trained as physicians but ordained as missionaries and concentrated on the task of preaching. Others, such as Peter Parker, sought to practice both the callings of missionary and medical practitioner.

== ABCFM in China ==
After the London Missionary Society and the Netherlands Missionary Society, the Americans were the next to venture into the mission field of China. The Board of Commissioners for Foreign Missions, representing the Congregational Churches of the United States, sent out Revs. David Abeel and Elijah Coleman Bridgman in 1829. They were received in February 1830 by Dr. Robert Morrison. These men worked first among the Chinese and Malays of the Straits Settlements. From 1842 to his death in 1846, Mr. Abeel devoted himself to establishing a mission in Amoy (modern Xiamen).

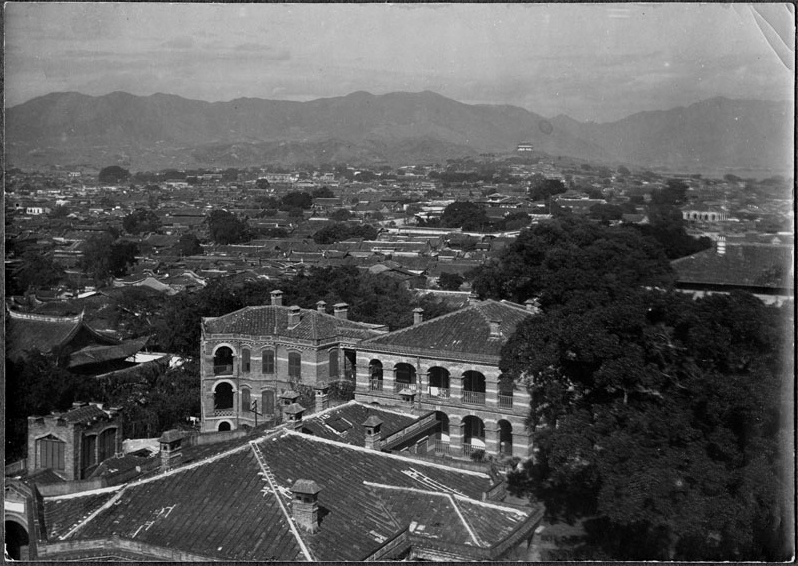
View of ABCFM compound in Fuzhou, ca.1911–1918

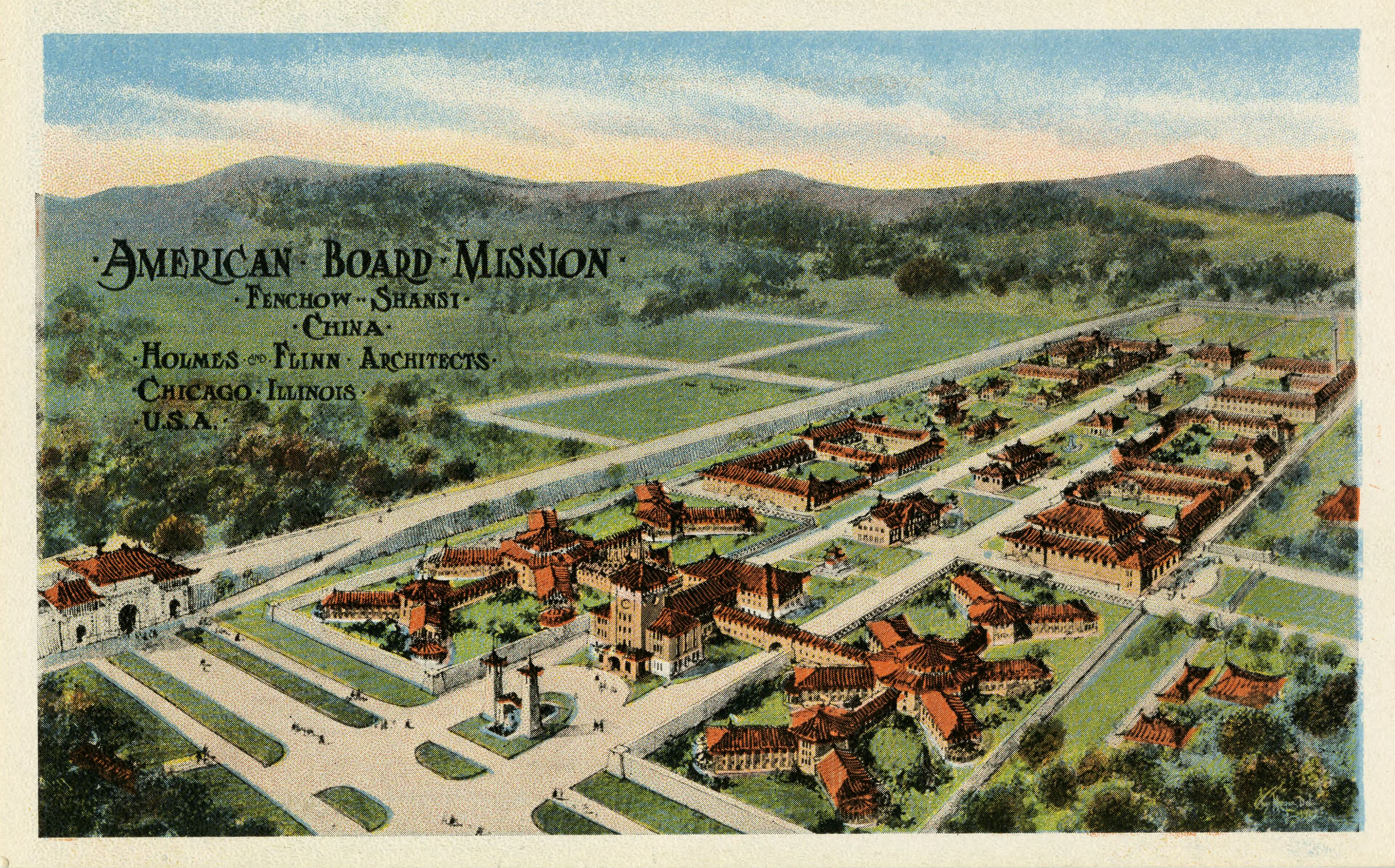
Color postcard of American Board Mission, Fenchow, Shansi, China. Carleton College participated in this mission program from the early 1900s until the late 1948.

The American Board followed with many other appointments in rapid succession. Revs. Ira Tracy and Samuel Wells Williams (1812–1884), followed in 1833, settling at Singapore and Macau. In the same year Revs. Stephen Johnson (missionary) and Samuel Munson went to Bangkok and Sumatra. There were four great centers from which smaller stations were maintained. These were Fuzhou, in connection with which were fifteen churches; North China, embracing Beijing, Kalgan, Tianjin, Tengzhou, and Baoding, with smaller stations in the various districts of the center missions; Hong Kong; and Shanxi, with two stations in the midst of districts filled with opium cultivation and staffed by missionaries of the Oberlin Band of Oberlin College. One station was established in Taiku in late 1882 and the other, Fenchow in 1887.

At Tengzhou missionaries established a college, over which Dr. Calvin Mateer presided. Tengzhou was one of the centers for Chinese literary competitive examinations. Mateer believed that the light of modern science shown in contrast with "superstition" would prove effective. He and his wife taught astronomy, mathematics, natural philosophy, and history. He trained young men to be teachers all over North China. The young men whom he had trained in Biblical instruction began native ministry. Drs. John Livingstone Nevius and Hunter Corbett (1862–1918) co-operated in this latter work, by giving a theological education to candidates for ministry during a portion of each year at Yantai.

At its principal stations in China, the Society maintained large medical dispensaries and hospitals, boarding schools for boys and girls, colleges for native students, and other agencies for effecting the purposes of the mission. It also helped create the Canton Hospital. As of 1890 it had twenty-eight missionaries, sixteen lady agents, ten medical missionaries, four ordained native ministers, one hundred and five unordained native helpers, nearly one thousand communicants, and four hundred and fifty pupils in its schools.

== ABCFM in the Middle East ==
The ABCFM founded many colleges and schools in the Ottoman Empire and the Balkans. For example, the American College of Sofia in Bulgaria is the successor to a Boys' School founded by the ABCFM in 1860 in Plovdiv and a Girls' School in Stara Zagora in 1863. They were combined in Samokov, Bulgaria in 1871, and moved to Sofia in the late 1920s.

== Missionaries sponsored by ABCFM, listed by location ==
=== Africa ===
- Theresa Robinson Buck (1912–1965), nurse missionary in Southern Rhodesia
- Mary Floyd Cushman (1870–1965), Chilesso, Angola (1922 to 1953)
- James Bennett McCord (1870–1950), Durban, KwaZulu-Natal, South Africa
- William Cullen Wilcox (1850–1928) with wife Ida Belle Clary Wilcox (1858–1940), Inanda, KwaZulu-Natal, South Africa (1881 to 1887); they arranged for Black South Africans to own land, and as a result they were driven out of South Africa in 1918.

=== Europe ===
- Jonas King (1792–1869), Athens, Greece
- Reuben H. Markham (1887–1949), Samokov, Bulgaria
- Mary Louisa Matthews (1864–1950), Bitola (Monastir), North Macedonia (formally European Turkey) (1888 to 1920)

=== Western Asia ===
- Caroline C. Bush (1847–1919) Harpoot, Ottoman Empire
- Thomas Davidson Christie (1843–1931) Central Turkey (1877 to 1920)
- Joseph Gallup Cochran (1817–1871), with wife Deborah Wilson Plumb, Urmia and Seir, Qajar Iran
- Oliver Crane (1822–1896), Turkey
- Nancy Jane Dean (1837–1926), Urmia, Qajar Iran
- Wilson Amos Farnsworth (1822–1912) with wife Caroline Elizabeth Palmer (1825–1913), Caesarea, Ottoman Empire (1854 to 1903)
- Fidelia Fisk (1816–1864), Urmia, Qajar Iran
- William Goodell (1792–1867) Beirut, Lebanon (Syria)
- Mary Louise Graffam (1871–1921), Sivas, Ottoman Empire
- Asahel Grant (1807–1844), with wife Judith Grant, Urmia, Qajar Iran (1835 to ?); the first American to reside in Iran.
- Justin Perkins (1805–1869), with wife Charlotte Bass, mission to Urmia, Qajar Iran (1835 to ?); the first American to reside in Iran.
- Benjamin Schneider, Bursa (1834 to 1849), and Aintab (? to 1877), Ottoman Empire
- Corinna Shattuck (1848–1910), Urfa, Turkey (Ottoman Empire)
- Clarence Ussher (1870–1955), Van, Ottoman Empire
- Mary E. Van Lennep (1821–1844), Istanbul (Constantinople), Ottoman Empire
- George E. White (1861–1946), Marsovan, Ottoman Empire

=== Southern Asia ===
- Dan Beach Bradley (1804–1873), Thailand (Siam)
- Cynthia Farrar (1795–1862), Mumbai (Bombay) and Ahmednagar, India (1827 to 1862)
- Gordon Hall (1784–1826), Mumbai (Bombay)
- Asa Hemenway (1810–1892) with wife Lucia Hunt Hemenway (1810–1864), Thailand (Siam) (1839 to 1850)
- Adoniram Judson (August 9, 1788 – April 12, 1850), first U.S. missionary to Myanmar (Burma)
- John Scudder Sr. (1793–1855), patriarch of the Scudder family of missionaries in India
- Miron Winslow (1789–1864), Sri Lanka
- Royal Gould Wilder (1846-1860), Ahmednagar and Kolhapur

=== Eastern Asia ===
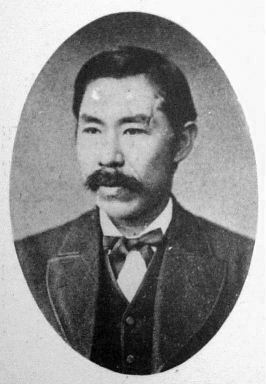
Joseph Hardy Neesima, the founder of Doshisha University.

- William Scott Ament (1851–1909), controversial missionary to China (1877-1909)
- Elijah Coleman Bridgman (1801–1861), first U.S. missionary to China (1830-1861)
- Eliza Jane Gillett Bridgman, (1805-1871) Shanghai, Beijing (1845-1871)
- Peter Parker (physician) (1804–1888), Canton, China (1834-1847)
- Dyer Ball (1796–1866), Singapore (1838 to 1841)/Hong Kong (1843 to 1845)/Canton, China (1845 to 1866)
- Mary Frances Buckhout McVay (1910–2010) Wen Shan Girls School, IngTai (Yongtai), China (1939 to 1941)
- Jerome Dean Davis (1838–1910) Kyoto, Japan
- Daniel Crosby Greene (1843–1913) Kyoto, Japan
- Joseph Hardy Neesima (1843–1890) Kyoto, Japan
- Dwight Whitney Learned (1848–1943) Kyoto, Japan
- Sidney Lewis Gulick (1860–1945) Kyoto, Japan
- Eliza Talcott (1836–1911) Kobe, Japan
- Julia Elizabeth Duddley (1840–1906) Kobe, Japan
- Cornelia Judson (1860–1939) Matsuyama, Japan
- Luella Miner, (1861–1935) Beijing, China
- James Hudson Roberts (1851–1945), Beijing and Zhangjiakou, China
- Arthur Henderson Smith (1845–1932), 54 years in China
- Daniel Vrooman (1818–1895) Canton, China (1852 to 1866)
- Charles Daniel Tenney, (1857–1930), China
- Lucy Bement (1868–1940), China
- Charles Robert Hager (1851–1917), Hong Kong/Canton, China (1883 to 1910)
- Charles Adolous Nelson (1860–1951), Canton, China (1892 to 1922)

=== North Pacific Ocean ===
- Lorrin Andrews (1795–1868), Lahaina, Hawaii
- Richard Armstrong (1805–1860), Maui and Oahu
- Angeles Mangaser Avecilla (1902–1975), Oahu
- Lydia Brown (1780–1865), Maui and Molokai
- Hiram Bingham I (1789–1869), Honolulu, Hawaii
- Titus Coan (1801–1882), Haili Church, Hilo, Hawaii
- Charles McEwen Hyde (1832–1899), Honolulu, Oahu
- David Belden Lyman (1803–1884), Haili Church, Hilo, Hawaii
- Lorenzo Lyons (1807–1886), Imiola Church, Hawaii
- Abigail Willis Tenney Smith (1809–1885), Molokai, Honolulu
- Betsey Stockton (c. 1798–1865), former slave, Lāhainā, Maui (Sandwich Islands) (1822 to 1825)
- Asa Thurston (1787–1868), Kailua-Kona, Hawaii

=== North American Indians ===
- Daniel Sabin Butrick (1789–1851), Cherokee Nation (1810s to 1850s)
- John Dunbar (1804–1857), Pawnee Indians
- William Montague Ferry (1796–1867), Mackinaw Mission, Michigan Territory
- Stephen Return Riggs (1812–1883), Dakota people (1837 to 1883)
- Cephas Washburn (1793–1860), Cherokee Nation (1818 to 1850)
- Marcus Whitman (1802–1847) with wife Narcissa Prentiss Whitman (1808–1847), Flathead, Nez Perce, Cayuse nations, Oregon
- Samuel Worcester, missionary to Cherokee Nation 1820s–50s
- Frederic Ayer (1829–1848) and Elisabeth Taylor Ayer (1828–1848) Mackinaw Mission, La Pointe (Frederic only), Sandy Lake (Frederic only), Yellow Lake, Pokegama Lake, Fond du Lac (Minn), Red Lake. All but Mackinaw were specifically Ojibwe missions; Mackinaw served a number of Great Lakes tribes. The Ayers also served under Am. Missionary Assoc. at Atlanta post-Civil War to serve freedmen Frederic 1865-1867 and Elisabeth 1865–1868.
- Edmund F. Ely and Catherine ElyOjibwe missions at Sandy Lake, Fond du Lac, Pokegama, La Pointe.
- Sherman Hall and Betsy Parker Hall LaPointe Ojibwe mission
- William Boutwell and Hester Crooks BoutwellLeech Lake & Pokegama Lake Ojibwe missions.
- Henry Blatchford Pokegama Lake, La Pointe & Odanah Ojibwe missions
- Sabrina Stevens Yellow Lake & Pokegama Lake. Previously associated with Ohio missions to Maumee at Black River.
- Leonard Wheeler and Harriet Wood Wheeler La Pointe & Odanah Ojibwe missions.
- John Seymour and Jane Leavitt Seymour Mackinaw, Yellow Lake, and Pokegama Missions to Ojibwe.
- Orrin Coe--hired man at Pokegama Mission, later participant in AMA mission at Red Lake with Ayer.

== Indigenous workers affiliated with the Board ==
- Babajee (b. 1791)
- Liang Fa (1789–1855)
- David Malo (1795–1853)
- Henry Opukahaia (c. 1792–1818; also known as ʻŌpūkahaʻia)
- Puaaiki (c. 1785–1844)
- Asaad Shidiak (c. 1797–c. 1832; also known as Asaad Esh Shidiak)
- Joel Hulu Mahoe (1830–1890) second full-Hawaiian to be ordained.
- Henry Blatchford, of the Ojibwe mission did translations and lay preaching beginning at Pokegama (Minnesota) in 1836, was ordained eventually and worked at the Odanah mission until he died in the late 19th century.
- Abdullah Abdul Kadir (1797–1854), known as "Munshi Abdullah", was a Malayan scholar and translator under the employ of Alfred North, an ABCFM missionary stationed in Singapore.

== See also ==
- American Ceylon Mission
- Dan Beach Bradley (Siam, 1834, resigned 1847)
- Haystack Prayer Meeting
- History of Christian missions
- Oberlin Band (China)
- Protestant missionary societies in China during the 19th Century
- List of American Board missionaries in China
- Doshisha University
- List of Missionaries to Hawaii
- Woman's Boards of the Congregational Church

== Publications ==
- American Board of Commissioners for Foreign Missions (1838). Report, Volume 29. s.n.
- American Board of Commissioners for Foreign Missions (1836). Annual Report, Volumes 27-31.
- American Board of Commissioners for Foreign Missions (1840). Annual Report - American Board of Commissioners for Foreign Missions, Volumes 31-33.
- İdris YÜCEL, "An Overview of Religious Medicine in the Near East: Mission Hospitals of the American in Asia Minor (1880–1923)", Journal for the Study of Religions and Ideologies, Vol 14, Issue 40, Spring 2015.
- İdris YÜCEL, "A Missionary Society at the Crossroad: American Missionaries on the Eve of the Turkish Republic", Journal of Modern Turkish History, Vol 8 Issue 15, Spring 2012.
- İdris YÜCEL,"An Overview of Religious Medicine in the Near East: Mission Hospitals of the American Board in Asia Minor (1880–1923)", Journal for the Study of Religions and Ideologies, Vol 14, Issue 40, Spring 2015.
- İdris YÜCEL, Anadolu'da Amerikan Misyonerliği ve Misyon Hastaneleri (1880–1934), TTK Yayınevi, Ankara 2017.
- İdris YÜCEL, Kendi Belgeleri Işığında Amerikan Board'ın Osmanlı Ülkesindeki Teşkilatlanması, Erciyes Üniversitesi, Yüksek Lisans Tezi, 2005
