= Mary Matthews =

Mary Matthews may refer to:

- Mary L. Matthews (1864–1950), American educator and missionary
- Mary Ellen Matthews, American photographer
- Mary Lockwood Matthews (1882–1968), American home economist
- Mary Ann Wrighten (1751–1796), née Mary Matthews, English singer, actress, and composer
- Mary Mathews Adams (1840–1902), née Mathews, Irish-born American writer and philanthropist

== See also ==
- Mary Matthew, fictional character played by Madhavi in the Indian film Agneepath (1990)
