= Arthur E. Sutherland Jr. =

American lawyer, law professor and author

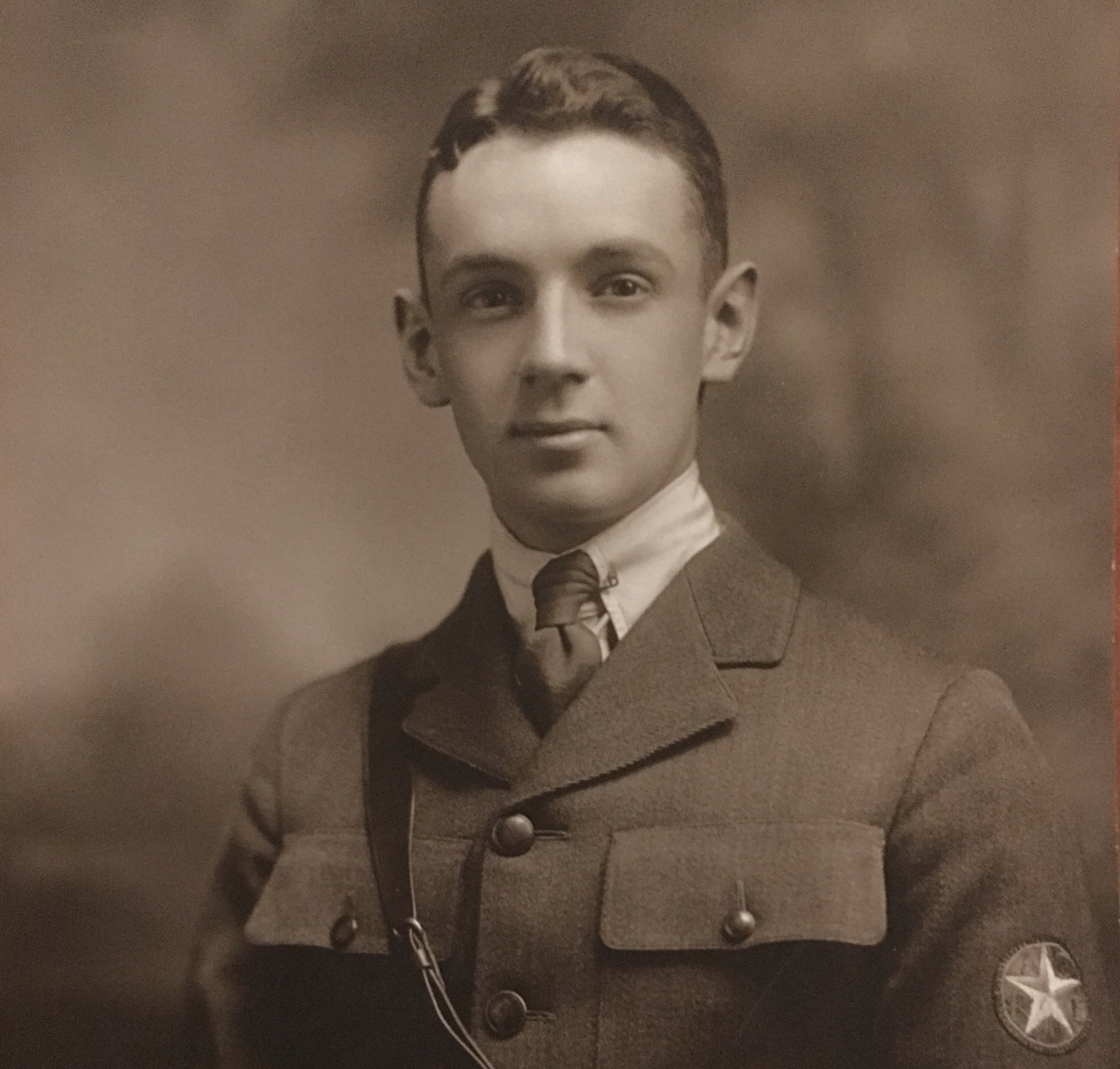
- Sutherland as a young man
- Born: February 9, 1902; Rochester, New York, U.S.
- Died: March 8, 1973 (aged 71); Cambridge, Massachusetts, U.S.
- Education: Wesleyan University; Harvard University
- Scientific career
- Fields: Lawyer, educator and historian
- Institutions: Harvard University Cornell University U.S. Army

Arthur Eugene Sutherland Jr. (February 9, 1902 – March 10, 1973) was an American lawyer, law professor, and author.

== Biography ==
Arthur E. Sutherland Jr. was the youngest son of Arthur E. Sutherland a Justice of the New York State Supreme Court. He was born and raised in Rochester New York.

In the fall of 1918, as a young man of 16, Sutherland was invited by the chairperson of ACRNE James L. Barton to volunteer as a secretary to the American Committee for Near East Relief and travel for half a year. Sutherland postponed his entry to Wesleyan College for a year.

While in Turkey, one day Barton announced to Arthur that he was to document post-WWI conditions in Anatolia with Captain Emory H. Niles.

Sutherland and Niles surveyed conditions in the Eastern Anatolian region of the recently toppled Ottoman Empire. Their written report came to be referred to as the Niles and Sutherland Report.

Sutherland attended college at Wesleyan University class of 1922, and was a member of the noted Harvard Law School Class of 1925. He clerked for US Supreme Court Justice Oliver Wendell Holmes Jr. from 1927 to 1928.

After law school Sutherland returned to practice law for 14 years in Rochester, N.Y. with his father, Arthur E. Sutherland and uncle William A. Sutherland.

Sutherland married Margaret Susan Adams and had four children: David, Peter, Eleanor and Prudy. Mrs. Sutherland died New Year's Eve 1957/1958, one of the 70,000 Americans who died of the Asian flu during the 1957 pandemic. His second wife was Mary Elizabeth Genung Kirk.

Arthur E. Sutherland died of cancer in 1973 in Cambridge, Massachusetts, and is buried in Wildwood Cemetery in Amherst, Massachusetts.

== Career ==
=== Military service ===
During the Second World War, Sutherland served as Aide-de-Camps to General Mark W. Clark with distinction in the U.S. Army. He left the Army in 1945 as a Colonel, with a number of high honors, including the Bronze Star and the Order of the British Empire.

=== Awards and decorations ===
See Historical Bio

Order of Ouissam Alaouite, Grand Cross – First Class (Morocco)
Legion of Merit, with cluster (America)
Order of the British Empire (England)
Croix de guerre 1939-1945 (France)
Czechoslovak War Cross, War Cross (Czechoslovakia)

=== Law professor ===
Cornell University invited Arthur E. Sutherland Jr. to teach law after WWII in 1945.

Soon after, in 1950 Harvard Law School invited him to teach. Arthur E. Sutherland Jr. was the Bussey Professor of Law, author of a number of books on the law, and a frequently cited legal scholar on topics of both constitutional and commercial law. He was a member of the Harvard Faculty of Law for twenty years between 1950 and 1970. Sutherland helped draft the Uniform Commercial Code, a body of laws establishing common trade practices among the United States. He was chair of a special committee working to revise Massachusetts "blue laws" in 1962. The simpler and more coherent set of laws was later adopted by the Massachusetts Legislature. Sutherland was on the opposing legal team in the Gallagher v. Crown Kosher Super Market "Blue Laws" case brought before the US Supreme Court.

Sutherland was an associate of Harvard's Adams House and was acting Master of Lowell House for a year from 1965 to 1966.

Loeb University Professor, Paul A. Freund said of Sutherland that he "was an unusual combination of the scholarly and the homespun," with great "liveliness of mind and spirit." "His teaching was enlivened by anecdotes from the real world of law practice. He was one of the most popular Law School Faculty members within the larger University," Freund continued.

== Selected works ==
- The Law at Harvard: A History of Ideas and Men, 1817-1967
- The Path of Law from 1967: Proceedings and Papers at the Harvard Law School Convocation Held on the One-Hundred Fiftieth Anniversary of Its Founding, edited by Arthur E. Sutherland Jr.
- Government Under Law A Conference Held at Harvard Law School on the Occasion of the Bicentennial of John Marshall Chief Justice of the United States, 1801–1835, edited by Arthur E. Sutherland Jr.
- Constitutionalism in America: Origins & Evolution of Its Fundamental Ideas
- Apology for Uncomfortable Change: 1865/1965- Oliver Wendell Holmes Lectures At the University of North Carolina October 1963
- Constitutional Law: Cases and Other Problems, Henry Monagham, Paul A. Freund, Arthur E Sutherland, Mark DeWolf Howe, Ernest J. Brown
