= Daniel Vrooman =

American diplomat and cartographer (1818–1895)

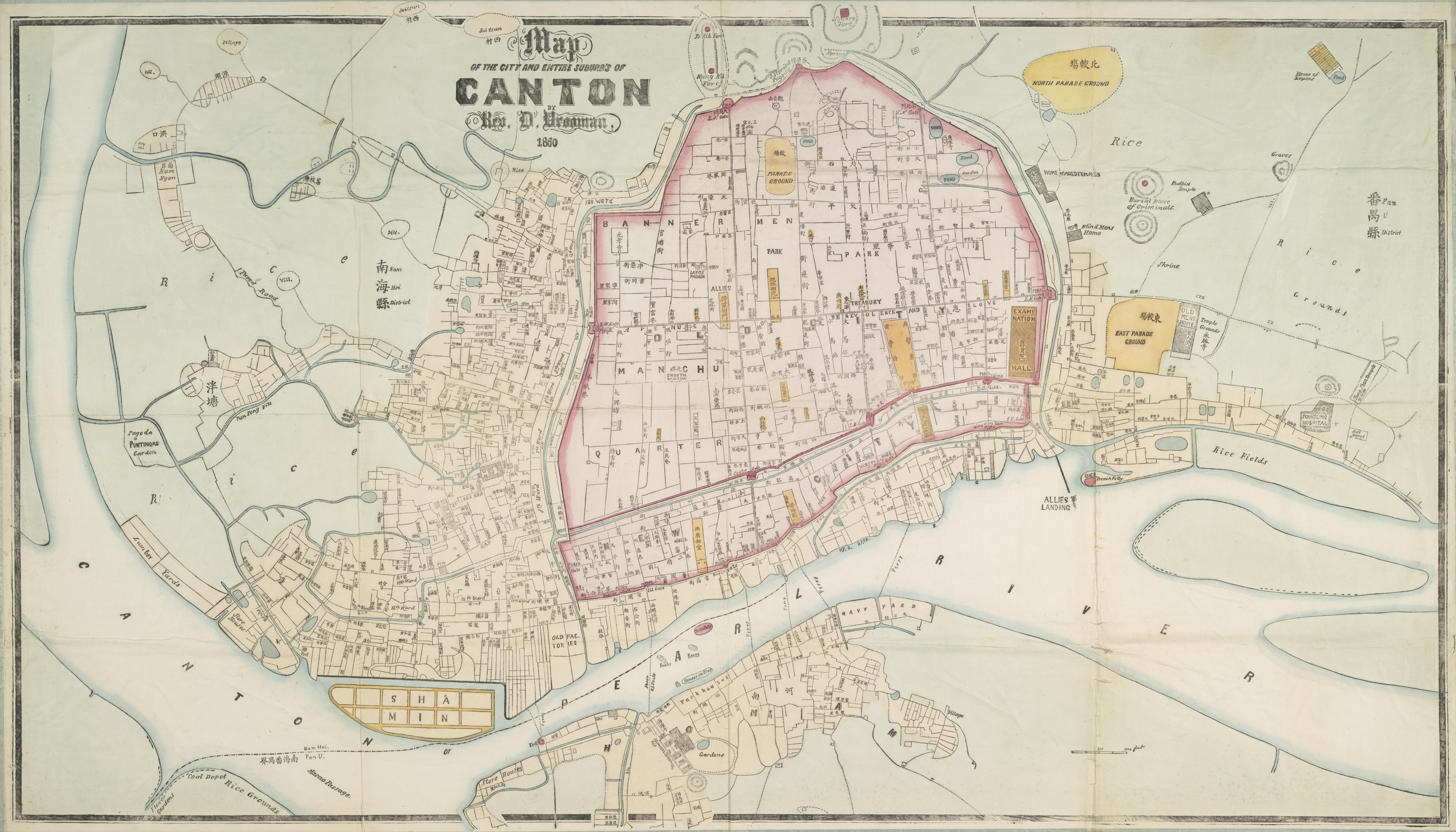
Daniel Vrooman's 1860 map of Guangzhou ("Canton")

Daniel Vrooman (15 August 1818 – 3 March 1895) was an American missionary, diplomat, and cartographer.

== Early life and China ==
Vrooman was born in Allegany County, New York, on 15 August 1818.

He and his wife Elizabeth Clemens (1826–1854) went to Guangzhou (then known as "Canton") in March 1852, having been posted there by the American Board of Commissioners for Foreign Missions. Soon after their arrival, he wrote to Scientific American, with questions regarding the use of photographs in magic lanterns, the standard American methods of rice cleaning, and the use of india rubber in printing presses.

Although Guangzhou had been opened to foreign trade by the 1842 Treaty of Nanjing ending the First Opium War, access to the walled cities of the Manchus and Chinese continued to be denied to foreigners, who were mostly kept to the mercantile ghetto of the Thirteen Factories on the southern shore of the western suburbs. Vrooman successfully made a highly accurate 3 ft × 5 ft (0.91 m × 1.52 m) map of the forbidden cities in 1855 by training one of his converts to pace the streets between major landmarks, marking a course by means of a compass and reference to the wall's major gates. These measurements were then compared against Vrooman's own, based on the angles of the visible landmarks with the high points of the city's suburbs. The map was so well done that, upon the opening of the city by the treaties of Tianjin (1858) and Beijing (1860), they were found to need no major changes, although the Second Opium War had seen the destruction of the Thirteen Factories and the creation of a new enclave at Shamian.

Elizabeth died in Macao in 1854 and he remarried three years later to Maria Wilberforce (1836–1866). He served as the American vice-consul and was said to have introduced mechanized cotton spinning to the city. In 1863, he published a Cantonese phonetic alphabet of his own devising.

== Later life ==
Vrooman retired from the ABCFM's Guangzhou mission in 1866 or '67, but continued to work as an independent missionary in Guangzhou until 1878.

In 1878, he was made superintendent over a mission to the Chinese in Victoria, Australia. He retired from this post in 1881.

He died in Oakland, California, on 3 March 1895.

== Works ==
- "Map of the City and Entire Suburbs of Canton", 1855, rev. 1860
- "Vrooman Phonetic Alphabet for the Canton Dialect of the Chinese Language", 1863
