= Theresa Robinson Buck =

American-born Southern Rhodesian missionary

- Born: May 25, 1912; Hartford, Connecticut
- Died: September 25, 1964 (aged 52); Chikore, Southern Rhodesia
- Other names: Teddy
- Occupations: Nurse and missionary

Theresa "Teddy" Robinson Buck (25 May 1912 – 25 September 1964) was an American-born Southern Rhodesian missionary. She trained as a nurse in the United States before being commissioned as a missionary to Southern Rhodesia in 1938. Buck worked in hospitals in Mount Selinda and Chikore, becoming sister-in-charge of both. After her death the Chikore hospital was renamed in her honour.

== Life ==
Born in Hartford, Connecticut on 25 May 1912, Buck was the daughter of Dr Charles Buck of Naples, Maine and appears to have grown up there. At the age of 12, Buck declared that she wanted to become a nurse and a missionary. She attended Rollins College in Florida and then Bates College in Maine where she majored in French. She was active in extra-curricular societies being publicity chairman of the college's branch of the Young Women's Christian Organisation and a member of the Christian Service Club. She was also active in the production of the college's yearbook, the Mirror, for which she was assistant art editor in her third year and art editor in her fourth year. Bates was also arts editor during her fourth year of the Garnet Bates' literary and arts magazine. By this time she was known as "Teddy" and had a reputation for being talented at art.

After her graduation from Bates with a Bachelor of Arts degree in 1934 Buck trained as a nurse at the Peter Bent Brigham Hospital School of Nursing in Boston. She graduated in 1937 and became a Registered Nurse. At one point she was employed by the Boston Lying-In Hospital. Buck returned to Hartford to attend the Kennedy School of Missions and was commissioned as a missionary in March 1938. This was a life appointment in the East Africa mission of the American Board of Commissioners for Foreign Missions.

Buck travelled to Southern Rhodesia in late 1938, and would spend the rest of her life in the country. She joined the staff of the Mount Selinda Hospital on 15 December 1938 as a nurse. She progressed to become a teacher of nursing and in 1948 was made sister-in-charge (chief administrator) of the hospital. In 1959 Buck was made sister-in-charge of the Cottage Hospital and Dispensary at Chikore, a position she held until her death. The hospital was growing rapidly from holding an average of 10 patients at any one time in 1952 to 80 by 1962.

Buck died on 25 September 1964 in Chikore. After her death the hospital was renamed in her honour, being referred to variously as the "Sister Buck Memorial Hospital" and the "Theresa Buck Memorial Hospital". The Maine Conference of the United Church of Christ donated a bell from a disused church in Gilead to the Chikore Hospital Chapel in memory of Buck and later raised funds towards a new steriliser for the hospital.
