= Mary L. Matthews =

American missionary (1864–1950)

Mary Louisa Matthews (August 28, 1864 – December 31, 1950) was an American educator and missionary. She taught and was in charge of a Protestant girls school in Monastir (now known as Bitola), a city in the Macedonian region of Ottoman Turkey, from 1888 to 1920. She was there through the waning years of the Ottoman Empire, the Young Turk Revolution, Balkan Wars I and II and World War I. She left detailed records of her observations of the turbulent affairs of the region during the thirty-two years she spent there. In 1937, her bravery during World War I was recognized when she was among the first group of women to receive the Alumnae Medal of Honor from Mount Holyoke College. She also received a commendation from the State Department for exceptional service to United States interests during World War I.

== Biography ==
Matthews was born in Cleveland, Ohio on August 28, 1864. She entered Mount Holyoke Female Seminary in September 1880. While there, she joined other young women interested in missionary work as a member of the Mount Holyoke Missionary Association. After leaving the school in June 1883 before graduating because of ill health, she taught at Fisk University while waiting for an appointment as a missionary from the American Board of Commissioners for Foreign Missions (ABCFM). Her appointment was approved and in 1888 she arrived in Monastir to begin duties as a teacher at the American School for Girls. She remained there until 1920 and took only three short furloughs to the United States, in 1893–96. 1904–05, and 1913–15. In 1909, the former headmistress of the school became ill and Matthews took over her duties.

The American School for Girls emphasized both academic and religious studies. Matthews was dedicated to the idea of educating girls, no matter their religious or ethnic background. Due to the almost constant political and wartime upheaval in the area, she was often engaged in relief work as well as in supervising the interests of the school. She kept a daily diary during all the years she spent at Monastir and this diary, along with her letters, is a valuable record of events in the Balkans at this time. During World War I, she was the only American who remained in Monastir. At that time, she oversaw the Essery Memorial Orphanage and also protected nearly forty war refugees, some former students or teachers and some entire families, in the basement of the school. During this period, Monastir and the school were under regular bombardment from artillery and poison gas shells.

In her diaries, Mary Matthews says the period 1917–19, during and just after World War I, became a highlight of her career, as she was able to transmit well over $100,000.00 from men working in the United States to their destitute families. The money was sent by wire to the American Consulate in Salonika (Thessaloniki) and thence eight hours up into the mountains to Monastir by courtesy of the French military pouch. Matthews had the responsibility of finding the women for whom the money was intended and transferring it to them.

James L. Barton, head of the ABCFM, wrote: "Miss Matthews is one of the heroines of the war and deserves the Victoria Cross or something better."

Matthews left Monastir to return to the United States in 1920, and spent time recovering and then teaching again at Fisk University. She returned to work as a teacher at the American Farm School in Salonica, Greece, and later was appointed by the ABCFM as the Foreign Secretary for the Near East, a position that primarily involved fundraising. She died in Lancaster, Wisconsin in 1950 at the home of her sister and was buried in Oberlin, Ohio, her longtime home.

Matthews' journals, letters, photographs, and artifacts which document first-hand observations of daily life in the Balkans during this period were passed down through three generations of her family and have been donated to Mount Holyoke College Archives and Special Collections.

== Bibliography ==
- Hubbard, Ethel Daniels. Lone Sentinels in the Near East: Myrtle Shane, Bitlis; Mary Matthews, Monastir; Olive Crawford, Trebizond; Mary Graffam, Silvan. Boston, Women's Board of Missions, 1920.
- Mary Matthews Papers, 1868-1850. Collection number MS0874. Mount Holyoke College Archives and Special Collections, 8 Dwight Hall, Mount Holyoke College, 50 College Street, South Hadley, MA 01075
- "A Mount Holyoke Woman in Macedonia: Mary Matthews and the American School for Girls, 1888 to 1920", online exhibition curated by Archives and Special Collections Assistants Liz Knoll, class of 2016 and Katia Kiefaber, class of 2017. Mount Holyoke College, South Hadley, MA. https://ascdc.mtholyoke.edu/exhibits/show/marymatthews
