= Woman's Boards of the Congregational Church =

Woman's Boards of the Congregational Church was an American Congregational confederation of cooperating, independent women's missionary Boards. Each was associated with the American Board of Commissioners for Foreign Missions (ABCFM). The four Boards were: Woman's Board of Missions, Boston (organized 1868; No. 1 Congregational House, Boston, Massachusetts), Woman's Board of Missions of the Interior (organized 1868; No. 59 Dearborn Street, Chicago, Illinois), Woman's Board of Missions of the Pacific (organized 1873; San Francisco, California), and the Woman's Board of Missions of the Pacific Islands (organized 1871; Honolulu, Hawaii, Sandwich Islands). (Note: The American Board of Commissioners for Foreign Missions (1909) only includes the first three of the four named Boards.) The first three of these Boards cooperated with the ABCFM in Mexico, Spain, the Turkish Empire, India, Ceylon, China, Japan, Africa (East, West, and South), and the Micronesian Islands; the fourth Board cooperated in the Hawaiian Islands and in Micronesia.

Their special department was work for women and children. Taken together, they supported nearly two hundred unmarried women at a time who were laboring in evangelistic, educational, and medical lines with missionaries of the ABCFM, receiving appointment, as did others, by the Prudential Committee. They demonstrated great efficiency in organization, grouping their local Auxiliaries into Branches, and reaching a large constituency and kindling zeal in missionary work. Life and Light was their common organ, published at the Congregational House, Boston.

There were several positive results of this cooperation. In 1871, there was a great disparity in the church-membership of all the ABCFM Missions in favor of men; in 1891, the number of men and women was very evenly divided. Then their schools for girls (exclusive of those taken by the Presbyterian Church in 1870) numbered: boarding-schools 11, pupils 350; common-schools 352, pupils 3,103. In 1891, the corresponding facts were: boarding-schools 53, pupils 3,300; common-schools 9:30, pupils 34,694. In 1871, such a thing as a dispensary for women was unheard of, and the few higher school buildings were inadequate; in 1891, the largest of these Boards has more than US$200,000 invested in such Christian monuments. In 1871, the American Board had 43 single women in missionary service-a larger number than had the ten other leading societies of America and Great Britain combined. During its 57 years of previous history, it had sent out 170 single ladies. In 1891, it enrolled 173 in a single year.

== I. Woman's Board of Missions, Boston ==
- Established: 1868.
- Office: 14 Beacon Street, Boston, Massachusetts.
- Territory: New England and the states east of Ohio.
- By 1920, its fields included:

- Europe: Austria-Hungary, Bulgaria, Serbia, Spain, Turkey in Europe.
- Latin America: Mexico.
- Asia: Ceylon, China (Chihli, Fukien), India (Bombay, Madras), Japan, Turkey in Asia.
- Africa: Angola, Natal, Rhodesia. Oceania: Philippine Islands, Caroline Islands

This Board aimed, by extra funds, efforts, and prayers, to cooperate with the ABCFM in its several departments of labor for the benefit of women and children; to disseminate missionary intelligence and increase a missionary spirit among Christian women at home; to train children to interest and participation in the work of missions. The initial step in its organization was taken by a handful of women, in a half-day meeting called in Boston (1868). Twelve churches of the vicinity were represented, and they began that day, without a dollar, without an auxiliary, without a missionary.

At the first anniversary of this meeting, more than 600 women were present and they reported 129 life members, two auxiliaries, an income of US$5,033, and seven missionaries in the field.

By 1891, this Board required three days for its annual meeting. Its first president held the office till January, 1890, when she resigned. Home force: branches, 23; auxiliaries 1,182, out of 1,921 churches; bands, 549; total 1,731.

The income for 1889 was US$123,218, a gain of US$8,000 on the previous year. There were about 15000 children in its Mission Bands, who had in some years contributed US$10,000.

Abroad, the Board sustained: missionaries 111, of whom 3 were physicians; boarding-schools, 32; day-schools, 228; pupils in all, 10,000; Bible-women, 143.

== II. Woman's Board of Missions of the Interior ==
- Established: 1868.
- Office: 19 South La Salle Street, Chicago, Illinois.
- Territory: The states from Ohio to Montana and Wyoming inclusive.
- By 1920, its fields included:

- Europe: Bulgaria, Greece, Serbia, Turkey in Europe.
- Latin America: Mexico.
- Asia: China (Chihli, Fukien, Kwangtung, Shansi, Shantung), India (Bombay, Madras), Japan, Turkey in Asia.
- Africa: Angola.
- Oceania: Marshall Islands

This Board was constituted only nine months later than the Board in Boston, and its beginning was fostered directly by Secretaries of the ABCFM acting with pastors in Chicago. The first auxiliary to enroll was a veteran society of Rockford, Illinois, dating back to 1838. At the end of four months, the Board forwarded US$1,200 to the treasury of the ABCFM. At the first annual meeting, the record ran: 70 auxiliaries, 52 life-members, 6 missionaries, US$4,096 received. At the end of twenty years, they had given more than half a million dollars, had 70 missionaries in the service, and had multiplied their auxiliaries twenty times, or once for every year.

Home force: Senior Societies, 997; Junior Societies, 355; Juvenile Societies, 648; total, 2,000. Added in 1889, 271: contributions in 1889, $56,685.26, -a gain of $7,000 on_the previous year. The children of the "Interior" gave over $6,000 in 1889.

Abroad, the force was represented by: missionaries 82, of whom 4 were physicians (6 went out in 1889); boarding-schools, 12; Bible-readers, 34.

== III. Woman's Board of Missions of the Pacific ==
- Established: 1873.
- Office: Room 421, 760 Market Street, San Francisco, California.
- Territory: The states west of the Rocky Mountains.
- By 1920, its fields included:

- Asia: China (Fukien, Shantung), India (Bombay, Madras), Japan, Turkey in Asia.
- Africa: Portuguese East Africa

In 1887, the territory covered by this Board was scarcely more than the State of California, which contained but 115 Congregational churches, 81 of them being aided by the Home Missionary Society. The Board had 67 auxiliaries, supported 5 missionaries, and contributed in 1889, US$4,490.

== IV. Woman's Board of Missions for the Pacific Islands ==
- Established: 1871.
- Office: Honolulu, Hawaii, Sandwich Islands.

This originated in the efforts of one of the missionaries to Micronesia while she tarried on her way for a visit at Honolulu. Its members were European and American women residing at the Hawaiian Islands, and it was almost entirely officered by descendants of the early missionaries there. Regular societies were established on several islands. Their contributions in the year ending June, 1889, amounted to $1,015.52. Up to June, 1888, the total amount expended by this Society on the foreign field (chiefly Micronesia) was $4,510.57. During the same seventeen years, there was also expended on the home field (Hawaiian Islands) $5,598.51.

The Board sustained a missionary in a girls' boarding-school on Ponape, and another among Hawaiian women of the islands, and shared in efforts for the Chinese among them. Its supervision was exercised over schools, Bible-women (6), a hospital, a home, a prison.

Work done by this Board was extended by two juvenile societies: "The Helping Hand," and "Missionary Gleaners." The latter contributed $200 in 1888 toward the salary of a second women in Micronesia.

Missionary effort for the Chinese at Honolulu developed a society, viz., the Kituk Nui To Ui (trans. Woman's Christian Association of Chinese Women).

== The three Boards in the U.S. (I, II, III) ==
While these three Boards were geographically separated and entirely independent in their home management, their relations to the ABCFM were the same, and their interests and labors abroad were side by side. Their missionary enterprises were therefore considered as a unit, without reference to that particular Board under whose direction any one enterprise in any particular field may have been.

=== Publications ===
Life and Light for Woman, the joint publication of the three Boards in the United States, was published monthly in Boston, at 60 cents per annum, and had about 16,000 subscribers. The Mission Dayspring, for children, was published jointly by the ABCFM and the Women's Boards. Each of the latter issued annually a variety of leaflets and reports from its own headquarters, and the Board of the Interior, in addition, printed monthly a twenty-page paper, Mission Studies, and furnished a column for a weekly paper in Chicago.

=== Educational work ===
These societies, in the outset, gave their first strength to schools, and consequently had a fine array of institutions of all grades. Of fifty-three boarding-schools for girls, several ranked as colleges. Such are the American College for Girls at Constantinople, the woman's department of Euphrates College at Harpoot in Eastern Turkey, the college at Marash in Central Turkey, and the Kyoto School, Japan. Courses of study in these institutions were equivalent to those pursued in high schools in the U.S. No Latin was taught, but the classic Greek was, in cases where there were Greek students. From the circumstances of the case, the language department was often the strongest. Young children in the entering class, at Constantinople for instance, often spoke three or four languages.

In interior cities like Marash three or four languages were in use. In schools in Japan, like the Kobe Home, Japanese, Chinese, and English studies were pursued. In all these institutions, Bible-teaching was made prominent, and public examinations were conducted in the Scriptures, as in mathematics. Daily prayers, meetings, Sunday school and church service were a part of the curriculum that had to be accepted by every parent. Musical instruction was usually afforded, and its full cost required. It became customary to give the students some gymnastic exercises. They were always kept in practice practice of such domestic duties as was thought proper in the families from which they came.

Tuition was not free in these higher schools beyond a limited number of part scholarships for those who were to become teachers. The school in Oodooville, Ceylon, was wholly self-supporting. All those in Japan were largely supported by the Japanese, and several, as at Osaka and Niigata, were wholly or in part under their control. That at Adabazar, Western Turkey, was the only one of its kind in that country, and was a successful experiment for a number of years. It was directed and supported by the Evangelical Armenian community, there being no Americans in the place, except the women who taught the school. The salaries of these women were paid in the U.S.

The boarding-schools and colleges were distributed as follows: South Africa, 2; European Turkey, 2; Asia Minor, 17; India and Ceylon, 11; China, 6; Japan, 7; Micronesia, 2; Mexico, 3; Spain, 1; Austria, 2.

==== Industrial training ====
At Inanda, in Zululand, the school-girls in 1888 harvested potatoes, corn, beans, pumpkins, and other vegetables and fruits sufficient to supply one third of the table necessities for a whole year, and planted 138 trees on Arbor Day. In Turkey, at Sivas, Armenian girls pulled down small barns and assisted in putting up a building. At Van, there was a furore over white embroidery; "they do it beautifully, quite equal to the nuns's work at home." At Marsovan, the girls cooked, washed, cleaned house, cleansed the wheat and rice, pickled dry beef and fruits. In Madura City, India, they pounded their rice, cooked their food, cut and made their own garments, and sometimes for the catechists' families as well. In all the schools in Japan, foreign sewing and knitting were introduced.

==== Village and day schools ====
These were not taught by American women but by trained pupils under their superintendence. An exceptional case was at Oorfa, Northern Syria, where the mission had a church, but no resident missionary. A women went there temporarily from Aintab in 1888, and aided by an Armenian girl, gave a part of her day directly to a school which, beginning with only 12 pupils, developed into a large school. Tuition in day-schools was nominal. Attendance at day-schools fluctuated with persecution and good or bad harvests. Ten high-schools on the plains of Cilicia had an aggregate of 356 pupils in 1889. One public school in Marsovan had over 200 pupils. Young business men paid 80 cents a term in the same city for tuition at a night-school. Five day-schools in the Spanish Mission had a total of 117 scholars; 16 in the Foochow Mission had 240.

=== Touring ===
Some missionaries combined teaching and touring. Two women at Harpoot, Turkey, after teaching for years, devoted themselves to the arduous life of itinerating among the sixty out-stations of that field. In Central Turkey, touring was extensively carried on. In European Turkey, one woman gave herself exclusively to evangelistic labors. In Stamboul, two carried on city missions in the form of Sunday-schools, coffee-house tract-distribution, mothers' meetings, prayer-meetings, and night school. In North China, at Kalgan, Tung-cho, Pang Chuang, and Pao-ting-fu, the whole missionary work was in that stage of development when hand-to-hand evangelistic labor was demanded, and several women give themselves to it exclusively. In Japan, evangelistic work was many-sided.

=== Medical lines ===
In 1888, Dr. Kate Woodhull treated 3,398 cases, 1,000 being new patients. She also trained a class of young women in medicine. There was a dispensary at Tung-cho, China. In Kyoto, Japan, a hospital and training school for nurses constituted a branch of the Doshisha University. The land was purchased with the gifts of 553 Japanese, and the buildings provided by friends in the U.S., especially young women of the Interior Board. There was a general ward for 12 patients, an obstetrical ward for 8, a house to accommodate 30 nurses, and other buildings. All were formally dedicated November, 1887. The head of the training-school was Miss Richards, who left the post of superintendent in the Boston Hospital to assume these duties, and the clinics were divided between Dr. Berry and Dr. Sara Buckley. There were five nurses in the first class.
