= Lucy Bement =

American medical missionary

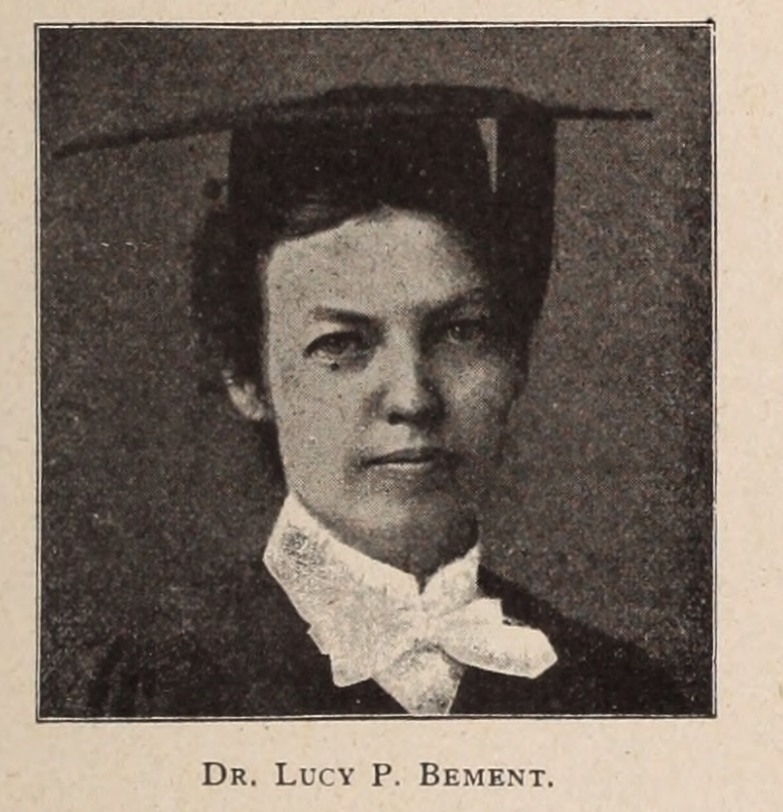
- Born: Lucy Permelia Bement; June 22, 1868; Dover Township, Ohio
- Died: October 30, 1940 (aged 72)
- Burial place: Evergreen Cemetery, Westlake, Ohio
- Education: Baltimore Medical College
- Occupation: Medical Missionary
- Organization: American Board of Foreign Missions

Lucy Permelia Bement (June 26, 1868 – October 30, 1940) was an American medical missionary who brought medical care to women of the district of Shaowu, China in the early twentieth century. During the time of Bement’s missionary work, cultural customs strictly forbade male providers from caring for female patients. Bement helped fill this need and saw an average of 46 patients per day, and on some days, more than 70 patients. According to some records, Bement saw an average of 20,000 patients annually.

== Early life ==
Lucy Permelia Bement was born in Dover Township (now called Westlake), Ohio and she, along with her sister Frances, attended a public primary school in West Dover, Ohio. The Bement sisters attended Sunday School in a small schoolhouse in the town and became members of the Second Congregational Church of Olmstead. Both sisters began high school in Elyria, Ohio in 1887.

The father of the Bement sisters was Lorenzo C. Bement, the town postmaster who also owned a grocery store. The grocery store was located at what is today Wagner's County Inn.

== Education ==
After graduating from high school, Bement worked with the American Missionary Association and taught at Pine Mountain, Tennessee. She then went to Massachusetts to attend the Training School for Nurses in Newburyport in 1893. After this, she attended Baltimore Medical College and received her degree in 1897. At the Baltimore Medical College, she was elected vice president of the Medical Society. After graduation, she joined the American Board of Commissioners for Foreign Missions.

== Personal life ==
Census reports indicate that Bement was never married and had no children. When she retired from her missionary work in China, she split her time between her hometown in Ohio and Los Angeles, California. Her favorite hobby was tending to her flower garden. She maintained this hobby her entire life, even while working in Shaowu. In a letter home in 1914, Bement requested that a tulip or hyacinth bulb be sent to her, where they would be planted in a place of honor in the hospital yard.

== Missionary work ==
=== Work in Shaowu ===
==== Journey to Shaowu ====
Bement and her sister, Frances, left the United States for Shaowu in 1898. According to a letter written by Frances, the trip from San Francisco to Shanghai took the sisters twenty-one days. Once in Shanghai, they waited three days for a coast steamer to take them to Fuzhou. After the sisters arrived in Fuzhou, China, they traveled two hundred and fifty miles up the Min River to the inland station. During the journey up the river, news of the foreign doctor's arrival traveled ahead of them, and hundreds of people lined the banks of the river to greet the Bement. Due to the large amount of supplies the boat was carrying, the journey took twenty-eight days. After leaving the river boat, the sisters walked and rode in sedan chairs until sunset when they reached Shaowu.

Shaowu was a dangerous place for the sisters to work; several tigers were killed within approximately five miles of where they were staying. Furthermore Bement describes how a cobra was killed mere feet away from her house in one of her letters.

==== Building a hospital ====
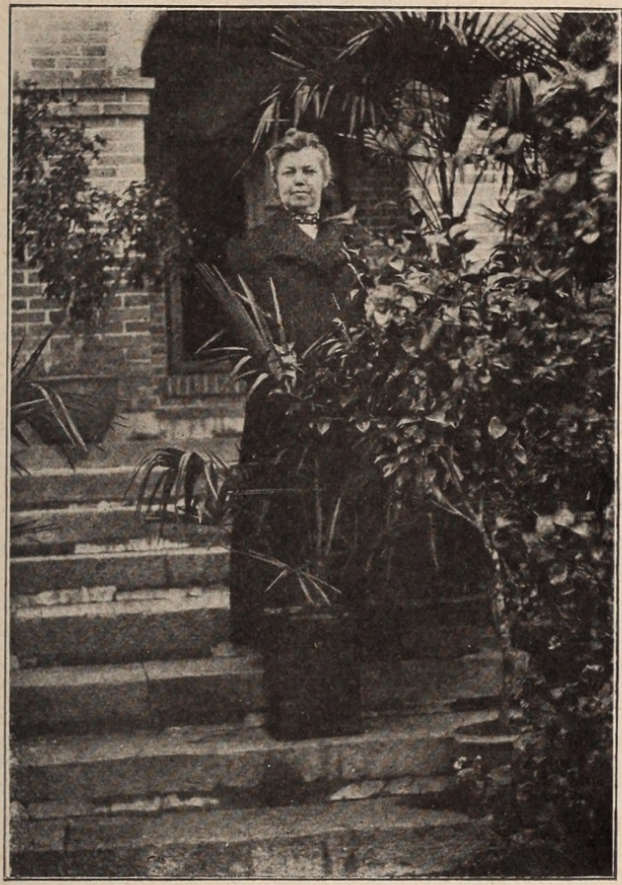
Dr. Bement in 1915

Bement and her sister remodeled a small house in the eastern part of Shaowu to use as a makeshift doctor's office, and she began seeing patients that the local druggist sent to her. When she was not treating patients, Bement spent her time learning the local language.

The work of the Bement sisters was interrupted by the Boxer Uprising. The sisters fled to the mountains near Fuzhou and waited until the rebellion had passed to return to Shaowu. When they arrived back at their office in Eastern Shaowu, they found that the house had been all but destroyed. Not a single window or door was left on the home and most of the floors and walls had been ripped out. The only part of the house that was left intact was the roof. The sisters found a pile of loose boards upstairs in the house, and with these they began repairing the house and prepared to see patients once more.

A girls school and dispensary were constructed in 1892, well before the Bement sisters arrived; however, the hasty construction of these buildings foreshadowed the challenges with building a hospital in Shaowu. Because of the instability of the soil, it was necessary to lay the hospital foundation fifteen feet deep. Bement would direct roughly forty unskilled masons as they constructed the hospital stone by stone. She often inspected the work herself, checking to make sure that none of the stones were loose. Each stone weighed fifty to one hundred pounds and were gathered from the bed of a river a half mile away. The process was made more difficult because of local beliefs that taking certain rocks would disturb the great dragon, so workers had to travel farther and dig up less accessible rocks.

Bement insisted that every brick being used to build the hospital be tested. If the brick rang when lifted and hit with a small stone, it was deemed good for use. If it did not ring, the brick was discarded. This practice led some to call the hospital 'Every brick-rung hospital."

The hospital included a dispensary, a house for the native hospital assistants, a kitchen, a laundry room, and a store room.

==== Providing care ====
Bement began administering medical care in Shaowu in December of 1899. Each morning she entered a waiting room filled with ill patients, some from as far as twenty or thirty miles away. This length of travel was not uncommon, as Dr. Bement served the largest geographical area in the mission. Dr. Bement treated a variety of illnesses, most commonly dysentery, fevers, open sores, indigestion, ulcers, and burns. She also treated cases of malaria, tuberculosis, and cholera. Bement sent many of the natives she taught at the hospital to the Women's Medical School in Peking, China (now known as Beijing) in hope that they would return to help her with the hospital in Shaowu. However, Bement also requested that the Board of Missionaries send another American doctor to the area, as there was simply too much illness for her to treat alone. In one of her letters, she wrote, "If you were to send a dozen new workers this years there would be enough work to tax their strength to the utmost."

Bement often wrote letters home to request medical supplies. In 1914, the most urgent item needed was a medicine case.

The biggest obstacle that prevented women from seeking care was the weather. In the fall when the weather was good, Bement saw up to 1,200 patients in a single month; however, during the rainy season in the spring, she would often see fewer than 300 patients per month.

Another obstacle to care was the unwillingness of the women to see the doctor more than once or twice. Bement described that in her experience, if a patient was improving she thought she would get well, and if she was not improving she thought that she might as well not come again.

==== Providing an education ====
In addition to providing medical care, the Bement sisters constructed a boarding school for girls adjacent to the hospital. While Bement took care of the ill, Frances dedicated her time to educating the youth of the area. The young girls were often paired with older girls with whom they would study and pray. The girls had breakfast at seven-thirty, and the school opened with prayers at eight-thirty. This quiet time lasted until nine. The girls studied and recited psalms and Bible chapters. The average age of the students was fourteen.

== Legacy ==
During journeys home to the United States, Bement often spoke at conferences or gave talks about the work she was doing in Shaowu. On October 11, 1904, she gave one such talk titled "Medical work in Shaowu" at the Minnesota state convention for the Women's Board of Missions of the Interior (W.B.M.I).

In late November 1926, Frances gave a talk about her school in Shaowu to members of the W.B.M.I. During the talk, she called attention to her sister and how she was worn out. Frances said that there was little prospect of Bement ever returning to Shaowu. Bement lived out the rest of her days in the United States and died in October 1940.
