= Lydia Brown (missionary) =

American missionary to the Hawaiian Kingdom (1780–1865)

- Born: July 1780
- Died: November 19, 1865 (aged 85); Honolulu, Hawaiian Kingdom
- Occupation: Missionary

Lydia Brown (July 1780 – November 19, 1865) was an American missionary to the Hawaiian Kingdom. At the age of 54, Brown was sent to Hawaii by the American Board of Commissioners for Foreign Missions to teach textiles to native Hawaiian women. She arrived on June 6, 1835, and taught textile production to young Native Hawaiian women on Molokai and Maui until 1857. She also created popular dyed textile designs, which were copied and produced at a factory owned by Kuakini. She died on November 19, 1865 (aged 85), in Honolulu.

== See also ==
- Richard Armstrong (missionary)
- Levi Chamberlain

== Sources ==
- Frost, Rossie Moodie (1971). "King Cotton, the Spinning Wheel and Loom in the Sandwich Islands". Hawaiian Journal of History. 5: 110–122. Archived from the original on June 19, 2025.
- Grimshaw, Patricia (2019) [1989]. Paths of Duty: American Missionary Wives in Nineteenth-Century Hawaii (Open Access ed.). Honolulu: University of Hawaiʻi Press. ISBN 978-0-8248-7913-6. Archived from the original on July 25, 2024 – via Project Muse.
- Peterson, Barbara Bennett; Low, Lena (February 2000) [1999]. "Brown, Lydia". American National Biography. Oxford University Press. doi:10.1093/anb/9780198606697.article.0802145.
