= Harbord Commission =

1919 commission by President Wilson

The Harbord Commission was a U.S. commission tasked by President Wilson to study the relationship between the United States and Armenia following World War I. Major General James G. Harbord led the group and produced the final report which came to be called ‘The Harbord Report’. An excerpt follows:

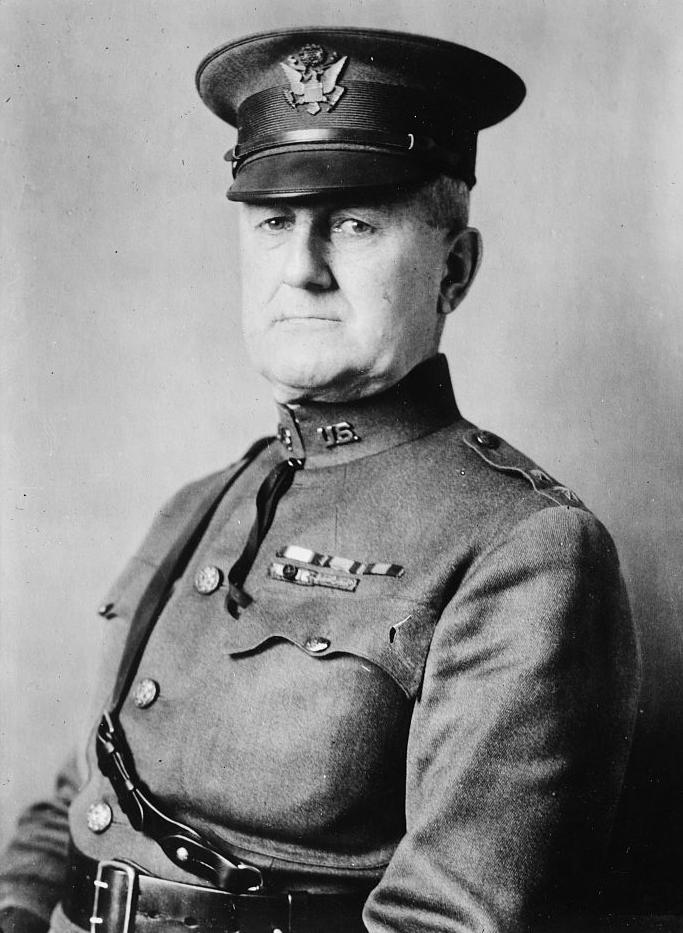
Major general James Harbord

"Massacres and deportations were organized in the Spring of 1915 under definite system, the soldiers going from town to town. The official reports of the Turkish Government show 1,100,000 as having been deported. Young men were first summoned to the Government building in each village and then marched out and killed. The women, the old men and children were, after a few days, deported to what Talaat Pasha called “Agricultural Colonies”,—from the high, cool, breeze-swept plateau of Armenia to the malarial flats of the Euphrates and the burning sands of Syria and Arabia. The dead from this wholesale attempt on the race are variously estimated from 500,000 to more than a million, the usual figure being about 800,000. Driven on foot under a fierce summer sun, robbed of their clothing and such petty articles as they carried, prodded by bayonet if they lagged; starvation, typhus and dysentery left thousands dead by the trail-side."

== Missions to Turkey, Anatolia & Armenia ==
In 1919 President Woodrow Wilson sent two missions to the Near East to gather information on issues relating to the future of the region in the immediate aftermath of World War I.

One group, later known as the "King-Crane Commission", was civilian, centered on Istanbul (Constantinople), and tasked to interview community leaders and representatives of the Ottoman government.

The second group, the "American Military Mission to Armenia" was sent to travel to the centre of Anatolia and Armenia. Secretary of State Robert Lansing instructed James G. Harbord to "investigate and report on the political, military, geographic, administrative, economic, and such other considerations involved in possible American interests and responsibilities in the region."

The fifty-member mission arrived in Istanbul (Constantinople) at the beginning of September 1919, and then traveled for 30 days: by train to Adana, Aleppo, and Mardin, then by motor car to Diyarbakir, Harput, Malatya, Sivas, Erzincan, Erzurum, Kars, Etchmiadzin, Erivan and, finally, Tiflis. A side-expedition left the main party at Sivas in order to investigate conditions at Merzifon, Samsun, and along the Black Sea coast as far as Trebizond. For information on the important vilayets of Bitlis and Van, General Harbord relied on information provided in the Niles and Sutherland Report which had just been published in August 1919.

The Harbord Report also indicated that the Turkish population was far more numerous than the Armenians even before the war and after the massacres and deportations of the Armenian population in Eastern Anatolia. Harbord's report stated that "the temptation to reprisals for past wrongs" would make it extremely difficult to maintain peace in the region.

The final conclusion of the report was the inclusion of Armenia in the possible American mandate for Asia Minor and Rumelia since a mandate for Armenia alone was not deemed feasible under these conditions.
