= Angeles Mangaser Avecilla =

Filipino Hawaiian social worker, educator (1902–1975)

- Born: Angeles Mangaser; November 17, 1902; Philippines
- Died: July 4, 1975 (aged 72); San Francisco, California, U.S.
- Other names: Angeles M. Avecilla, Angeles Mangaser–Avecilla
- Occupations: Social worker, educator
- Spouse: Alfonso Ganaden Avecilla

Angeles Mangaser Avecilla (née Mangaser; 1902–1975), was a Filipino social worker, missionary, and educator in the Territory of Hawaii. She was influential within the early Filipino community on the islands, specifically in Honolulu. Avecilla came from the Philippines to Hawaii in 1932, working with the Hawaiian Board of Missions, part of the American Board of Commissioners for Foreign Missions (ABCFM). In the 1930s, she worked as a social worker at the YWCA with Filipino women and girls in Hawaii. She also directed the Filipino adult education courses in the adult education department of the University of Hawaiʻi. Avecilla remained into Hawaii until 1955.

== Biography ==
Born in the Philippines in 1901 or 1902, Avecilla attended Union Theological Seminary. After leaving the institution, she worked as a teacher before becoming employed by the city of Manila in the Child Welfare Bureau. In 1931, she moved to the United States to attend the University of Minnesota. In 1932, Avecilla was hired by the Hawaiian Evangelical Association to work with the YWCA and improve the situation of Filipino women in Hawaii. She arrived in Hawaii in March of that year. Upon arriving, she began conducting speaking engagements about women's rights in the Philippines. Mangaser committed two days a week of work with the YWCA and spent the other three work days every week visiting Filipino people around Hawaii.

In 1940, Avecilla was appointed territorial supervisor for adult education in the Philippines Department of Public Instruction. In this role, Avecilla was in charge of directing adult education teachers in Hawaii's Filipino community. That same year, she graduated from the University of Hawaiʻi with a bachelor's degree. In 1944, Avecilla partnered with the university to launch adult education courses in Waipahu, Wahiawa, and Waipio. Avecilla returned to the Philippines in 1951 when her husband became president of the San Jose Colleges in Luzon. In 1954 she represented the United Church of Christ in the Philippines on a speaking tour of the Midwestern United States.

Avecilla was a singer and performed in charity concerts around Hawaii. She was also involved with the Honolulu Academy of the Arts. She spoke three different dialects of Filipino language. Avecilla was married to Alfonso Avecilla and had two daughters and a son, all of whom were born in Hawaii. She died in San Francisco on July 30, 1975.
