= Jacobo Angeles =

Mexican artisan (born 1973)

Jacobo Ángeles Ojeda
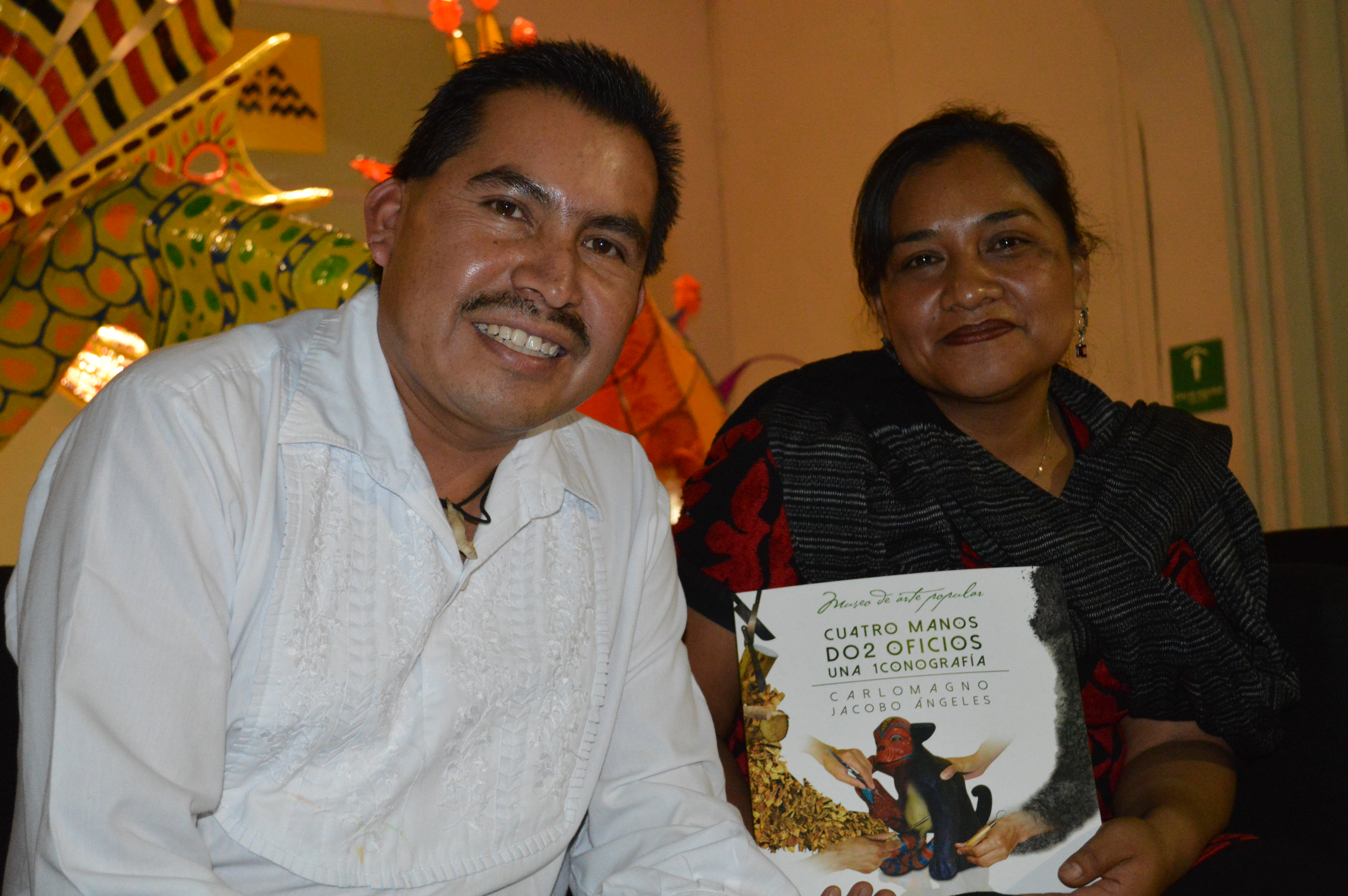
- Angeles and wife at presentation of book at the Museo de Arte Popular
- Born: April 17, 1973 (age 51); San Martín Tilcajete, Oaxaca
- Known for: alebrijes
- Spouse: María del Carmen Mendoza

Jacobo Angeles (born March 14, 1973) is a Mexican artisan from San Martín Tilcajete, Oaxaca who is known for his hand carved and distinctly painted alebrije figures. The town is noted for its production of these figures which generally are carvings of animals painted in bright colors and bold designs, and Angeles grew up carving the local wood they are made from. The artisan's work has become distinguished for the painting of fine, intricate designs over the base paint, often inspired by Zapotec and other indigenous designs. He works with his wife María del Carmen Mendoza, at the couple's home and workshop in their hometown. While Angeles continues to create alebrijes, much of the production of the workshop is done by younger members of the Angeles family, which is a tourist attraction in the town. Angeles travels frequently to promote alebrijes and Zapotec culture, especially in the United States, and his work has been shown in major venues in Mexico and abroad, as well as featured in two books. In 2014, he was invited to the Vatican to meet Pope Francis and set alebrije nativity scenes and Christmas tree ornaments.

== Background ==
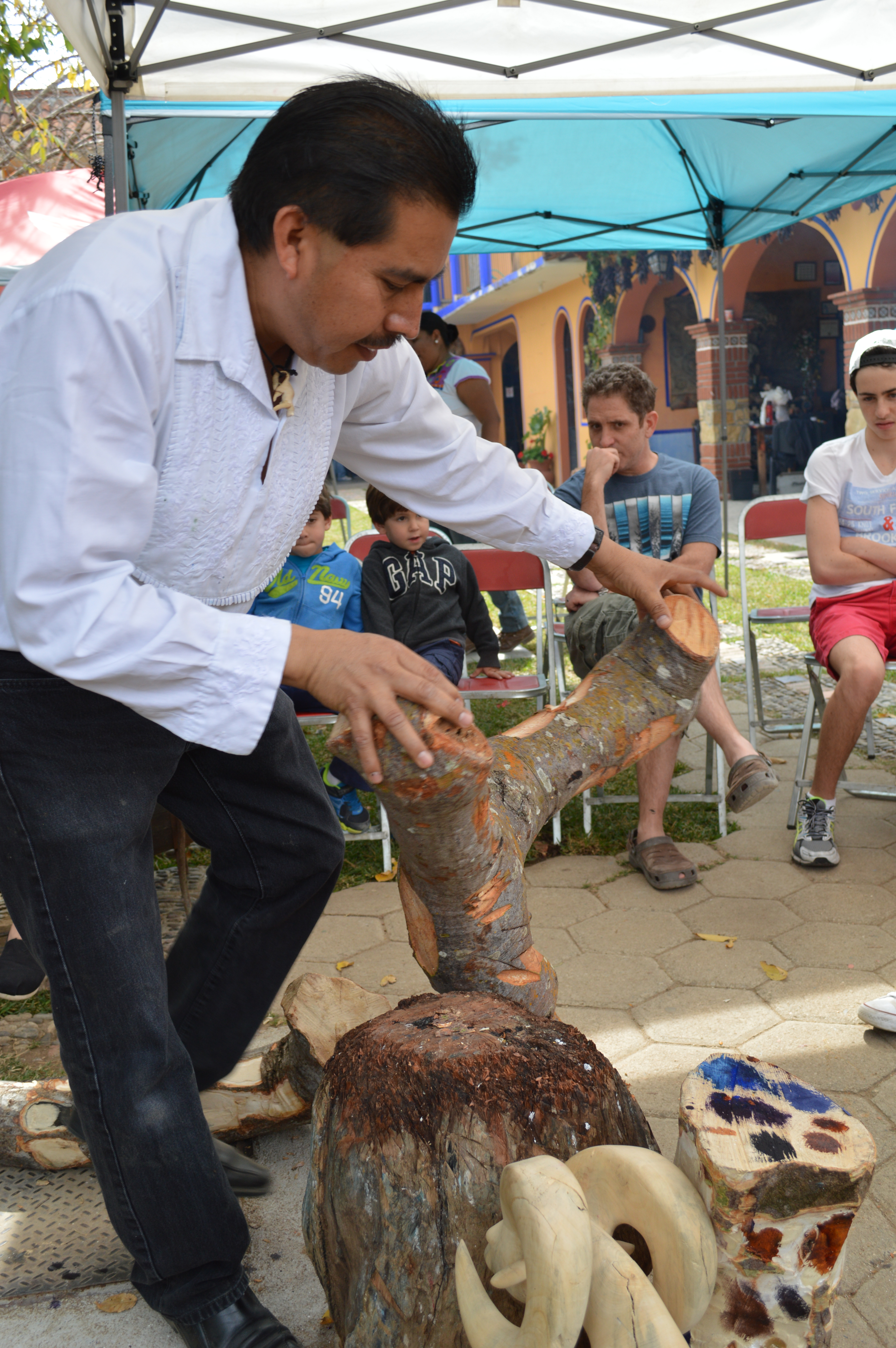
Angeles demonstrating copal wood and natural paints at his workshop in San Martín Tilcajete

Angeles and his wife María del Carmen Mendoza were both raised in subsistence agricultural families in San Martin Tilcajete, a Zapotec community in the Central Valleys of the state of Oaxaca. In his youth, Jacobo learned to carve wood from his father, and was interested in the twists and turns of copal trees, that lent themselves to alebrije shapes. However Angeles’ father died when the artisan was twelve, requiring him to support the family, which he did, in part, by carving alebrijes.

== Artistry ==
Angeles’ works and runs his business with wife María del Carmen Mendoza. Jacobo generally carves and paints pieces, and María generally designs, decorates and creates paints from natural materials.

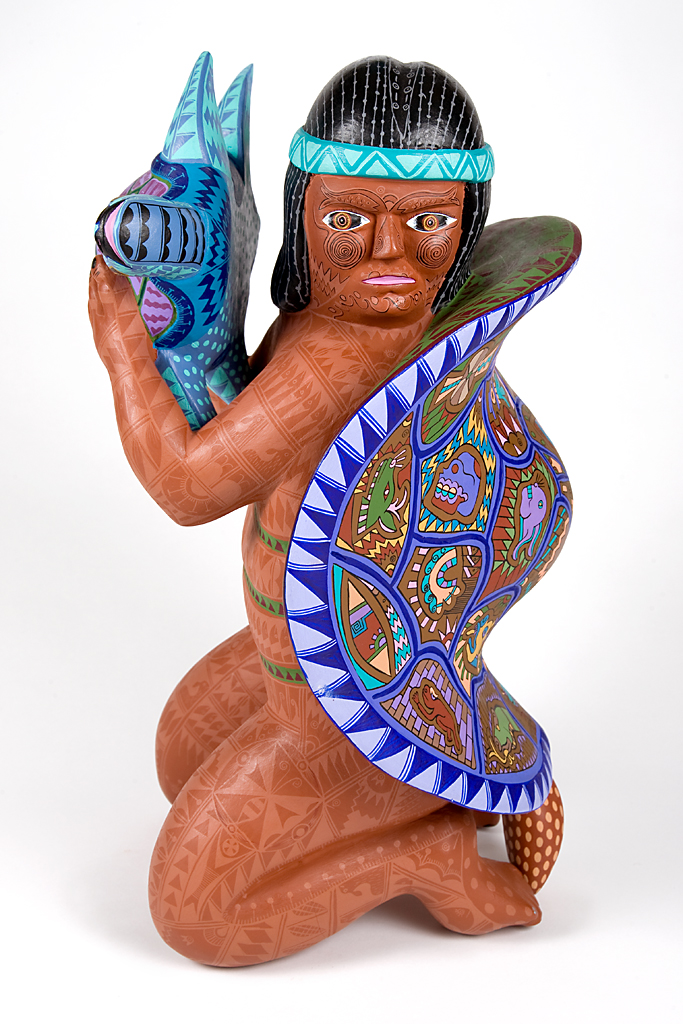
Tortoise nahual figure by the artisan

His work is distinguished by the carving style but particularly in the way his alebrijes are painted. Like other Oaxacan alebrije makers, the wood is soft copal, in his case collected from the nearby Sierra de Cuicatlán, and worked only with hand tools such as machetes, chisels and knives. The carved pieces range from centimeters to meters in length or height. The animals are generally recognizable can include jaguars, dogs, bears, owls and more, often doing something such as flying, scratching itself or fighting. One distinguishing elements in much of Angeles’ work is the appearance of human faces in otherwise animal figures, such as an armadillo with a woman's head with braids. This reflects a Mesoamerican belief in nahuals, humans who convert into some kind of animal at night, as well as Jacobo's own personal belief that everyone resembles an animal in some way.

The painting of his alebrijes is with bright, unnatural color and color combinations, but his works are distinguished with the use of very fine designs over the base coat. Elements in these designs include flowers, plants, geometric designs and indigenous symbols including Zapotec designs with origins in nearby Monte Albán and Mitla. The entire process of making one alebrije, including carving, drying, submersion in gasoline and other chemical to kill insect eggs in the wood and painting averages about a month.

== Workshop in San Martín Tilcajete ==
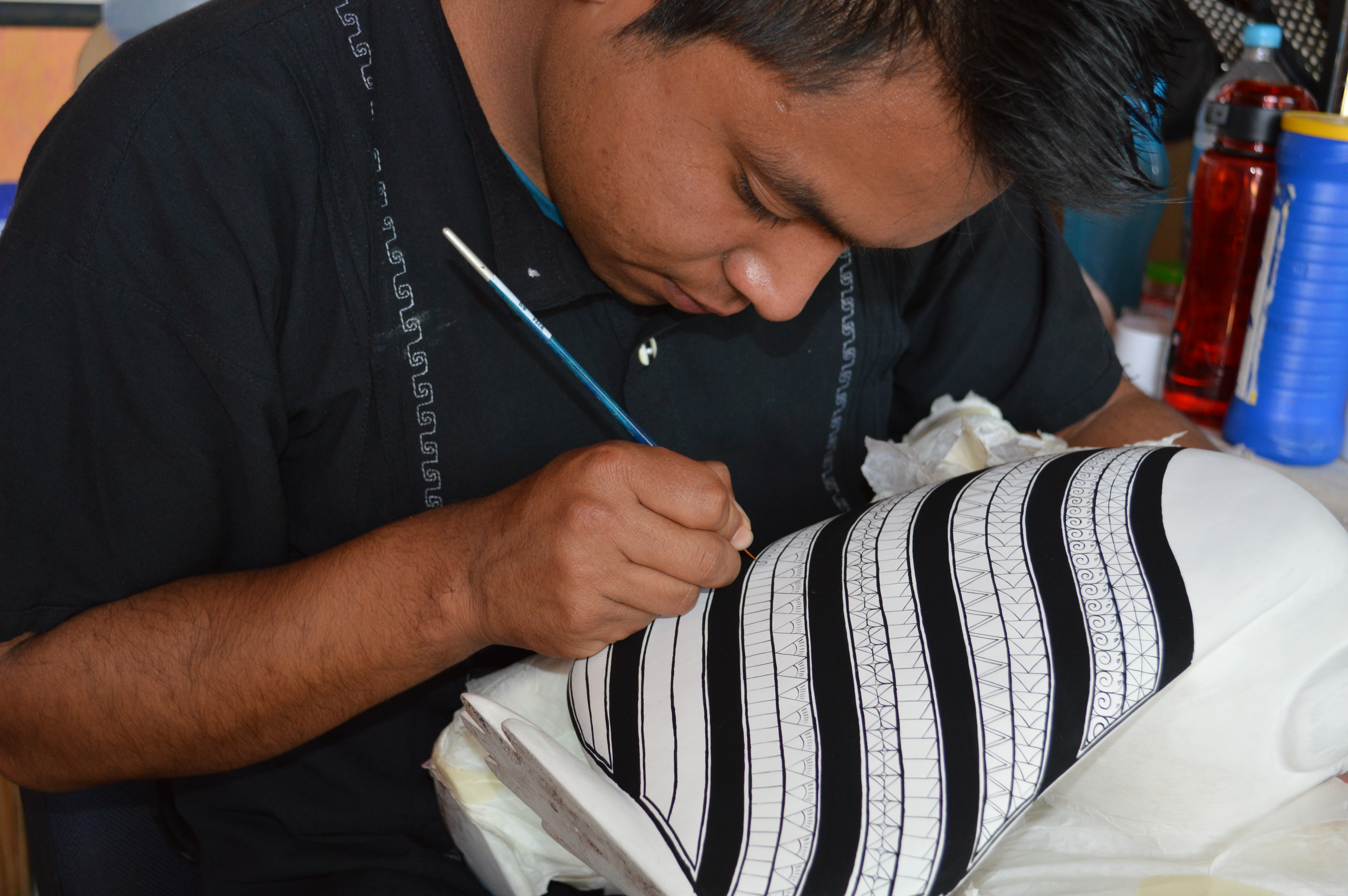
Young artisan painting designs onto a wolf alebrije at the workshop

Angeles and his wife Maria still make alebrijes at their workshop which is also their home in San Martín Tilcajete; however, operations here have grown to include dozens of people and has become a tourist attraction. The site welcomes visitors who can see the processes of carving and paintings as well as demonstrations by Angeles and others about copal wood, carving and natural paints. Most of the production of alebrijes is now done by younger people from San Martín Tilcajete, mostly relatives of the Angeles family. Their pieces do not command the prices as those done by the master, but they are in a similar style and are similar in quality. Carvers and painters in the workshop sometimes collaborate but generally the painters have license to decorate the figure however they like, much as the carver has license to create using only the branch or trunk as a guide.

== Recognition ==
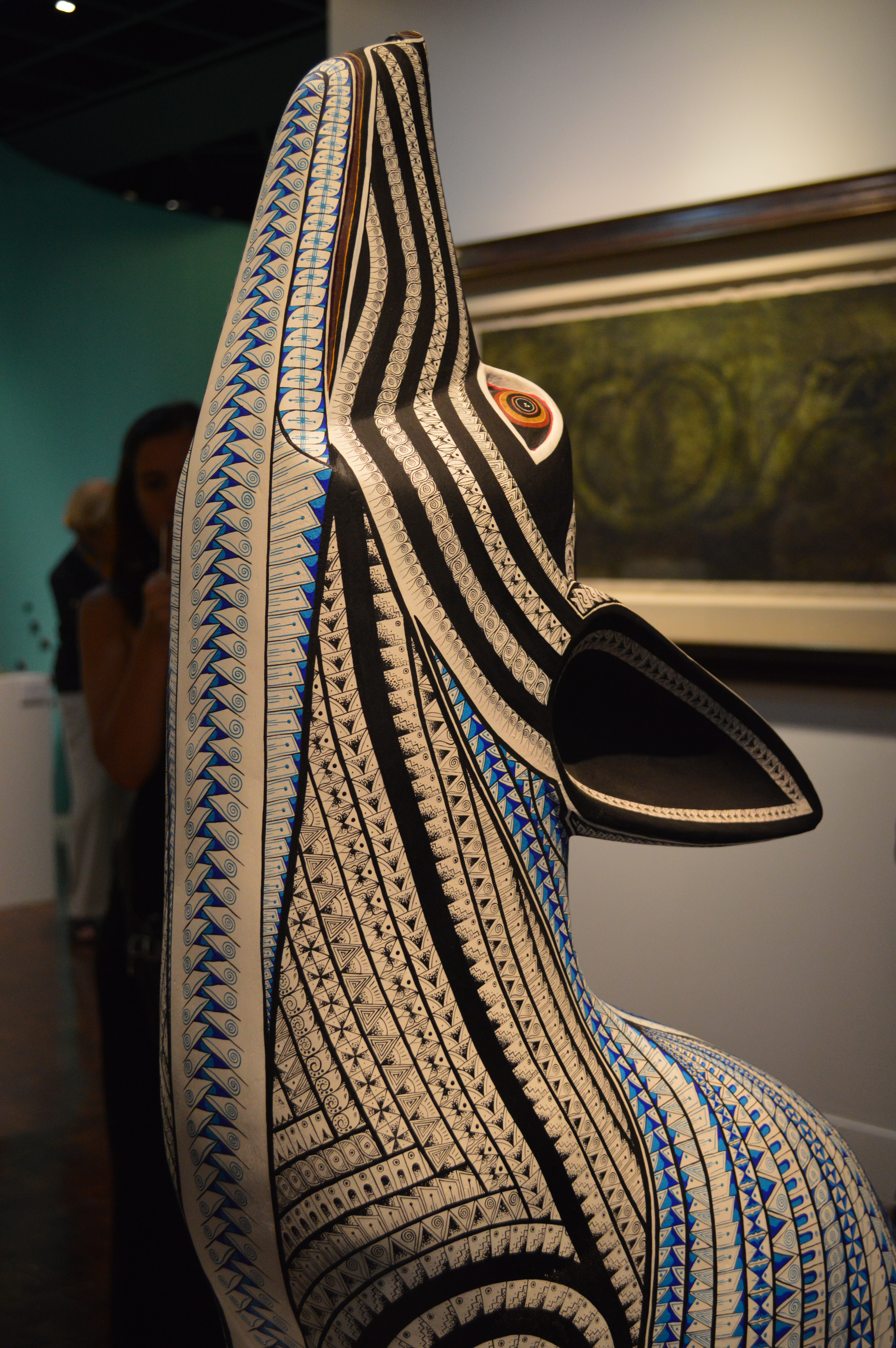
Close up of coyote head by the artisan

Angeles has become a major figure in the Oaxaca handcraft scene, traveling extensively to promote alebrijes and Zapotec heritage. His work has been exhibited in major national and international exhibitions. He and his work is regularly in the United States, especially in the summer, and his alebrijes have been exhibited in this country in venues such as the Smithsonian Native American Museum and the National Museum of Mexican Art.

He is listed as a grand master by the Fomento Cultural Banamex, and his work has been featured in two books Alebrijes. Masterpieces by Jacobo and María Ángeles (2012) and Cuatro manos, dos oficios. Una iconografía (2014), along with fellow Oaxacan artisan Carlomagno Pedro Martínez. In 2014, Angeles, along with other artisans from Oaxaca, was invited to the Vatican to meet the pope and to place 1,200 nativity scene figures and Christmas tree ornaments, which were exhibited at the Vatican Museum.

His works can be found in collections in many parts of the world, including those in the United States, India and Japan. His pieces sell for between 2,000 and 30,000 pesos each.
