= Stephen Johnson (missionary) =

American missionary (1803–1886)

Stephen Johnson (Chinese 詹思文 or 杨顺) (Griswold, Connecticut, 15 April 1803-Gouverneur, New York, 1886) was an American Presbyterian missionary in China. He graduated Amherst College in 1827, then Auburn Theological Seminary 1829-1832. In 1847 he founded the first Christian mission in Fuzhou where he remained till 1853 when he returned to America.
