= James L. Barton =

Protestant missionary, educator and relief administrator

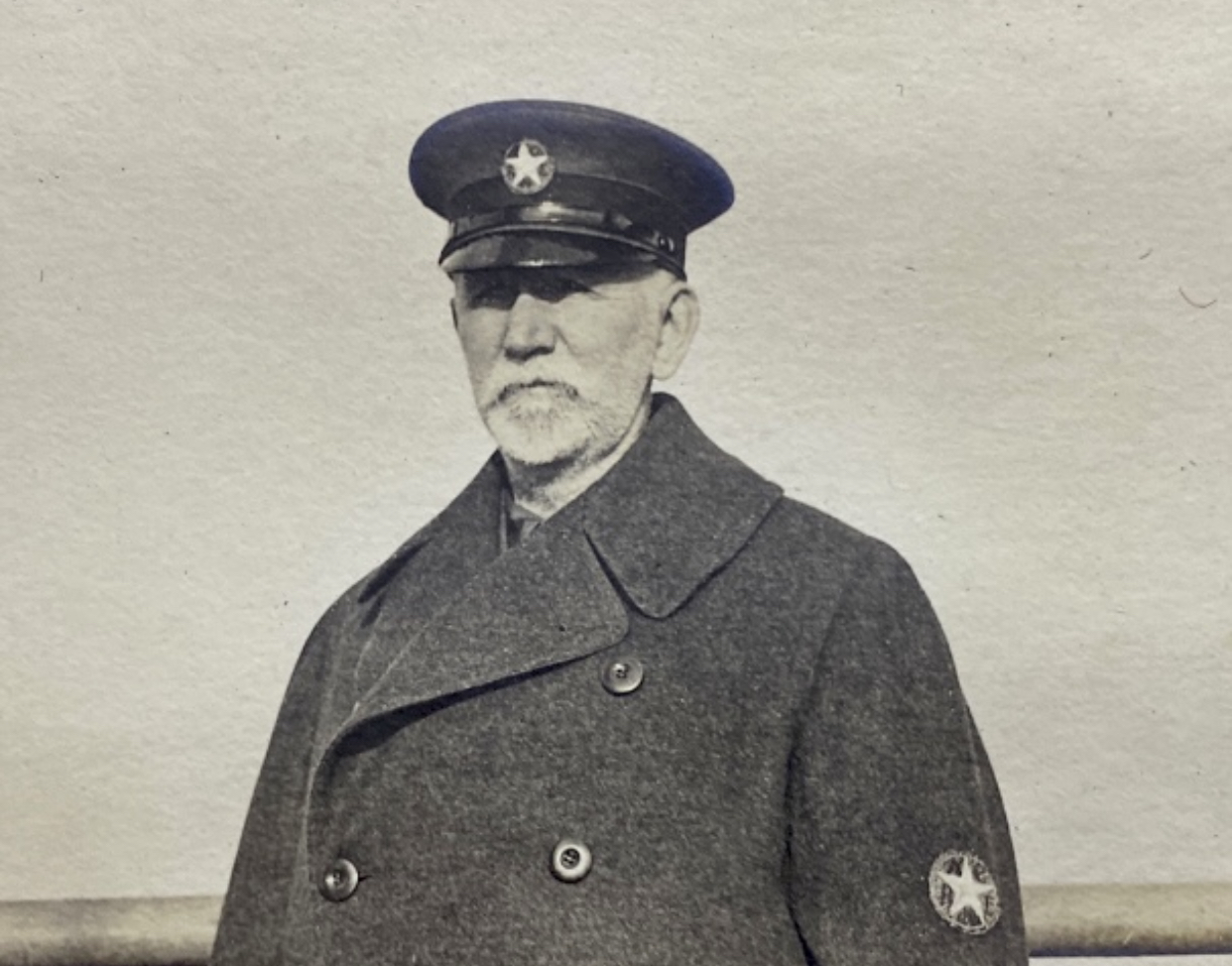
James Levi Barton en route to the Near East in 1919

James Levi Barton (1855–1936) was an American Protestant missionary and educator who devoted his life to establishing and administering schools and colleges in the Near East, and overseeing Near East relief efforts before and after World War I. He rose to prominence in the United States and internationally when he was named Chairman of the American Committee for Relief in the Near East, and subsequently the follow-on organization, Near East Relief. He was fluent in Armenian, a prolific writer with numerous books to his name, and the recipient of multiple honorary degrees.

== Biography ==
James L. Barton was born to a Quaker family in Charlotte, Vermont on September 23, 1855.

He graduated from Middlebury College in 1881, and from Hartford Theological Seminary in 1885. With conviction that foreign missions could bring great good to peoples abroad, he applied to serve overseas and sailed to the Near East with his bride. He was head of a large school system in Turkey for seven years before becoming president of Euphrates College, Harpoot, Turkey in 1892.

The couple returned to the United States when his wife's health began to fail. He found a position as foreign secretary of the ABCFM, the American Board of Foreign Missions.

In 1915 Barton found himself at the helm of the executive committee of The American Committee for Armenian and Syrian Relief (ACASR). What started as a modest but impactful fund-raising effort became one of the most successful nationwide fund-raising campaign at that time, complete with impactful campaign materials. By 1922 over $60 million had been distributed. And before Near East Relief's Congressional Charter ended in 1930, over $116 million had been raised and distributed.

As chairman of the American Committee for Relief in the Near East (ACRNE), Barton guided relief for the Near East after World War I. He would be asked to represent the Foreign Missions Conference of North America at the London Conference in 1921, and attended the Lausanne Conference (1922-1923), where an American treaty to end the war with Turkey was framed.

Before he retired in 1927, he left as part of his legacy the acquisition of permanent funds for the support of 21 international, interdenominational institutions of higher learning, including two medical schools.

== Family & Death ==
Barton married Flora Holmes (1859-1945). Together they raised a son, Howard, and a daughter, Maude.

Barton passed away nine years before his wife-- he died at New England Deaconess Hospital in Boston, July 21, 1936. Barton was buried at Newton Cemetery in Newton, Massachusetts. His tombstone shows the names of his wife and two offspring.

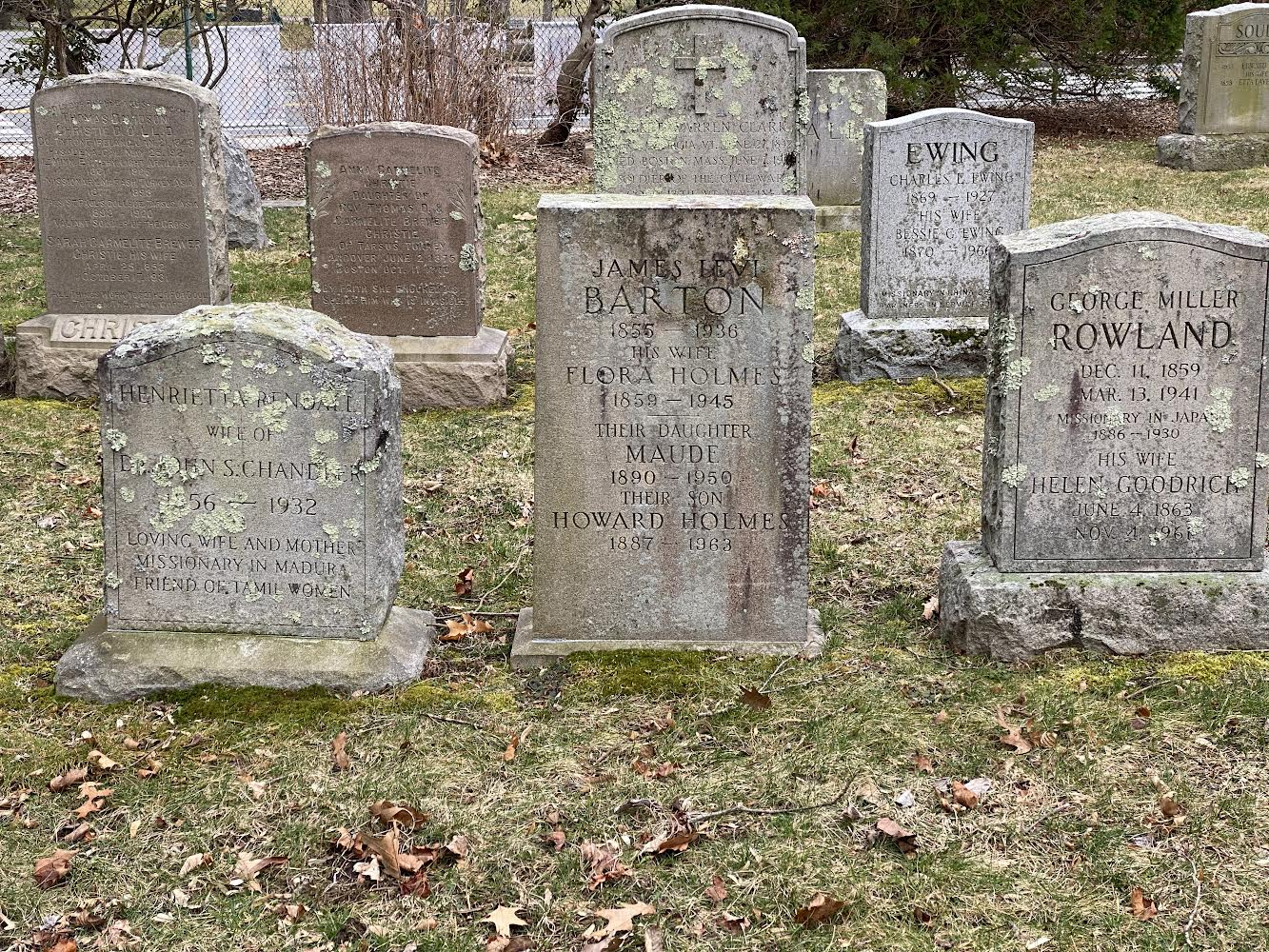
Missionary Tombstones in the Newton Cemetery

== Honorary doctorates ==
Barton was honored with five honorary doctorates from four universities:

- Middlebury College
- Oberlin College
- Dartmouth College
- Grinnell College

== Associated organizations ==
- Foreign Secretary of American Board of Commissioners for Foreign Missions
- Chairperson, American Committee for Relief in the Near East
- Chairperson, Near East Relief

== Books ==
- The Missionary and His Critics, 1906
- Daybreak in Turkey, 1908
- The Unfinished Task of the Christian Church: Introductory Studies in the Problem of the World’s Evangelization, 1908
- Human Progress through Missions, 1912
- Educational Missions, 1913
- The Christian Approach to Islam, 1918
- The Story of Near East Relief (1915–1930), 1930

== Articles and journals ==
- "The Effect of the War on Protestant Missions". Harvard Theological Review. XII (1). January 1919.
- "The Crisis in Armenia". The New Armenia. XI (12) (published December 1919): 178–179. November 1919.

== Additional reading ==
- "Online Books of James Levi Barton". The University of Pennsylvania.
- The Congregational Library & Archives in Boston, Massachusetts, in a room once occupied by the American Board of Foreign Missions, holds two typed manuscripts of Barton's memoir, one bound, and one not. Both are non-circulating.
