= American Baptist Historical Society =

The American Baptist Historical Society (ABHS) is the oldest Baptist historical society in the United States.

== History ==
The American Baptist Historical Society was created in 1853 at the instigation of John Mason Peck. In 1862, it was chartered under the laws of Pennsylvania and housed in the offices of the American Baptist Publication Society, located in Philadelphia .

In 1896, a fire destroyed the archives. That same year, the news of the fire (and the subsequent call for replacement materials) caused Samuel Colgate, a prominent New York businessman and Baptist layman, to give his personal collection of Baptist materials to Colgate University in Hamilton, NY for preservation. After Colgate Theological Seminary merged with Rochester Theological Seminary in 1928, creating Colgate Rochester Seminary (now known as Colgate Rochester Crozer Divinity School [CRCDS]), the Colgate collection moved to Rochester, NY, in 1948.

The call for replacement materials (for those items that were replaceable) was successful and the ABHS collection grew larger than ever. In 1955, ABHS moved its offices and collections to CRCDS. Then in 1984, ABHS moved its offices and the official archives of the American Baptist Churches USA. and its mission societies to the denomination's headquarters in Valley Forge, Pennsylvania. To distinguish the two locations and the collections housed in each, the Valley Forge location was known as the American Baptist Archives Center; the collections remaining in Rochester as the American Baptist-Samuel Colgate Historical Library. In 2008, ABHS consolidated its two locations and its collections and offices are now housed on Mercer University's Atlanta, GA, campus.

== Research ==
Visitors are welcome. The Society has some exhibits which feature parts of the collection. Researchers come by appointment from all over the world to use the Society's collections. Among its rarest materials:

- An 1644 original printing of the First London Confession of Faith, the first confession of the four major Baptist confessions of faith, in the British Isles;
- Manuscript letters written by missionary pioneers Adoniram Judson, Ann Judson, Sarah Judson, and Emily Judson as well as their children;
- African-American Baptist association minutes as early as 1829;
- Official denominational minutes and publication for ethnic Baptists, including Danish, Norwegian, Swedish, German, Italian, and Slovakian immigrant congregations;
- Official records of the Baptist World Alliance Baptist World Alliance;
- The Rauschenbusch Family Collection, including the papers of author and theologian Walter Rauschenbusch;
- Records of missionary surgeon Marian Boehr, letters of Lott Carey and Luther Rice.
