= Edward Judson (theologian) =

American theologian

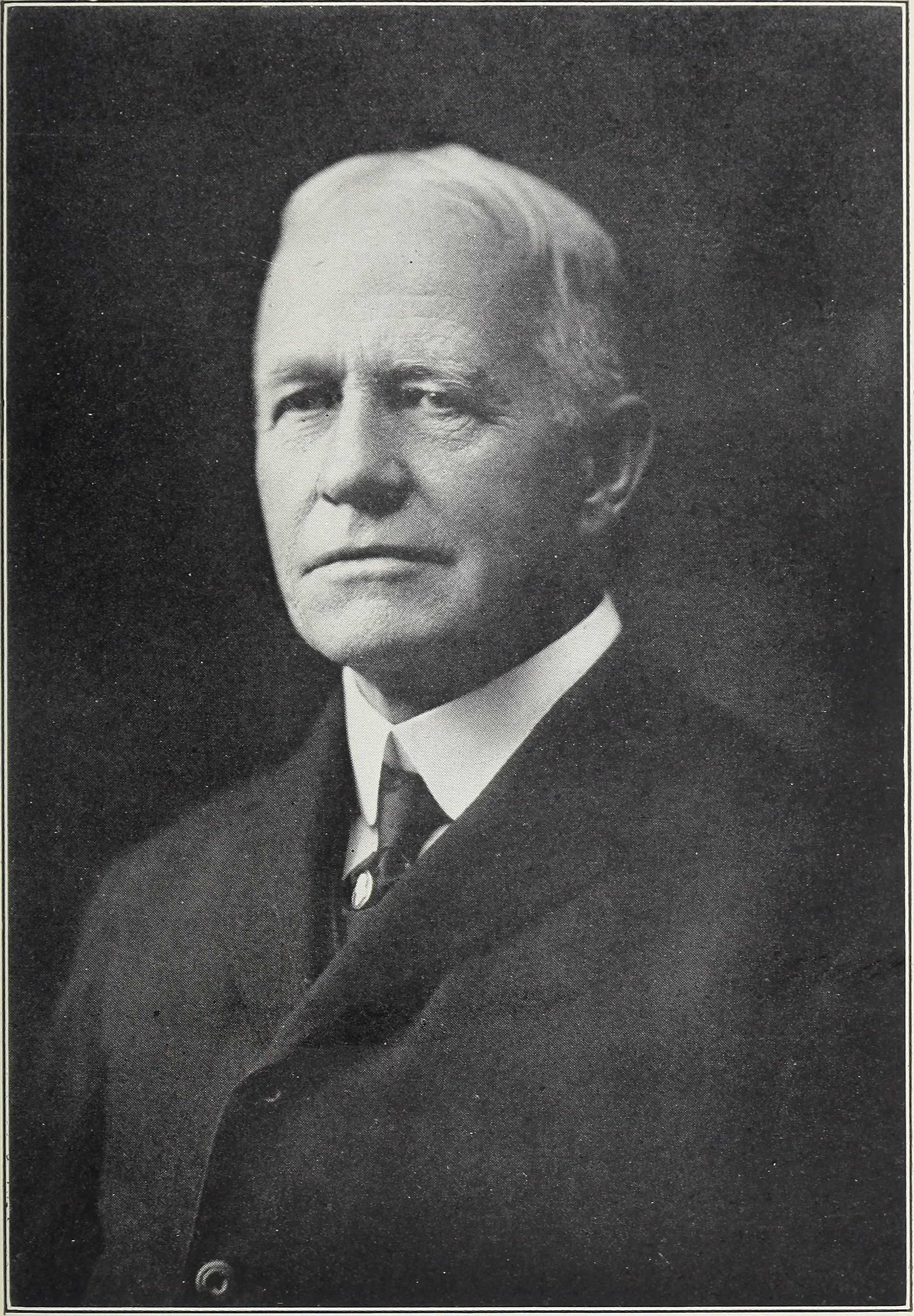
- Born: December 27, 1844; Moulmein, British Burma
- Died: October 23, 1914 (aged 69); New York, New York, US
- Education: Brown University
- Occupation: Clergyman

Edward Judson (December 27, 1844 – October 23, 1914) was an American Baptist clergyman.

== Biography ==
Edward Judson was born in Moulmein, British Burma, a son of the missionary Adoniram Judson and his second wife, Sarah Hall Boardman. He graduated from Brown University in 1863. In 1868, he was appointed professor of Latin and modern languages at Madison (now Colgate) University. In 1874–75, he traveled abroad, and after being ordained into the Baptist ministry in the latter year, served as pastor of a church in Orange, New Jersey, until 1881. Thereafter to the time of his death, he occupied the pulpit of a New York City church first known as the Berean Church, later as the Memorial Baptist, and finally as the Judson Memorial Church, which was erected on Washington Square to house the congregation. He lectured on theology at the University of Chicago (1904–06), on Baptist principles and polity at Union Theological Seminary (1906–08), and was named professor of pastoral polity at Colgate. He wrote a biography of his father, and later, The Institutional Church.

He died at Roosevelt Hospital in New York on October 23, 1914.

== Works ==
- The Life of Adoniram Judson (1883)
- The New Laudes Domini: A Selection of Spiritual Songs, Ancient and Modern for Use in Baptist Churches (1892)
- The Institutional Church: A Primer in Pastoral Theology (1899)
