= Al Carmines =

- Born: Alvin Allison Carmines; July 25, 1936; Hampton, Virginia, U.S.
- Died: August 9, 2005 (aged 69); New York City, New York, U.S.
- Occupations: Composer, lyricist, playwright, minister

Reverend Alvin Allison "Al" Carmines Jr. (July 25, 1936 – August 9, 2005) was a composer, lyricist, playwright, and clergyman. He is often regarded as a key figure in the expansion of off-off-Broadway theatre in the 1960s.

Carmines was born in Hampton, Virginia. Although his musical talent appeared early, he decided to enter the ministry, attending Swarthmore College, majoring in English and philosophy, and then Union Theological Seminary in the City of New York, earning a bachelor of divinity in 1961 and a master of sacred theology in 1963.

Carmines was hired by Howard Moody as an assistant minister at Judson Memorial Church on Washington Square Park, New York, to found a theater in the sanctuary of the Greenwich Village church in conjunction with playwright Robert Nichols. He began composing in 1962 and acted as well. His Bible study group grew into the Rauschenbusch Memorial United Church of Christ, with Carmines as pastor.

Carmines is perhaps best remembered in the church for the hymn "Many Gifts, One Spirit" #114 in the United Methodist Hymnal. He was commissioned by the United Methodist Women to write this hymn for their General Assembly in 1974.

Carmines' Judson Poets' Theater, along with other Off-off Broadway theaters; Caffe Cino, La MaMa E.T.C. and Theatre Genesis, were different to Off Broadway and Broadway houses due to their experimental nature and small size.

His 1973 musical The Faggot was a critical success which transferred from the Judson Memorial Church to the Truck and Warehouse Theatre and ran for 203 performances.

In 1977, he had a cerebral aneurysm that required months of therapy. He underwent surgery a second time in 1985, which only then cured his crippling headaches. He died in St. Vincent's Hospital in New York.

== Theater credits ==
Year	Title	Role	Notes	Ref.
1963	What Happened	Composer		
1963	Home Movies	Composer	Consists of two one act musicals: Softly and Consider the Nearness	
1964	Patter for a Soft Shoe Dance	Composer		
1964	Sing Ho for a Bear	Composer		
1965	The Promenade	Composer	Book and Lyrics by María Irene Fornés.	
1966	Pomegranada	Composer/Lyricist		
1967	Gorilla Queen	Composer/Lyricist	Additional music by Robert Cosmos Savage.	
1967	San Francisco's Burning	Composer	Words by Helen Adam.	
1967	In Circles	Composer	Transferred Off-Broadway.	
1968	The Sayings of Mao Tse-tung	Composer		
1968	Peace	Composer/Lyricist	Transferred Off-Broadway in 1969.	
1969	Christmas Rappings	Composer/Lyricist/Playwright		
1969	Promenade	Composer	Originally titledThe Promenade. Book and lyrics by María Irene Fornés.	
1969	The Urban Crisis	Composer/Lyricist/Playwright		
1970	The Playful Tyrant	Composer/Lyricist/Playwright		
1970	About Time	Composer		
1971	W.C.	Composer/Lyricist	A musical based on the life of W. C. Fields, which starred Mickey Rooney and Bernadette Peters but closed out-of-town.	
1971	Sister	Composer/Lyricist	Unproduced. Written with Paul Zindel for Angela Lansbury.	
1971	The Journey of Snow White	Composer/Lyricist/Playwright		
1971	Wanted	Composer/Lyricist	Transferred Off-Broadway in 1972. Produced by Woolly Mammoth Theatre Company in 1995.	
1971	Joan	Composer/Lyricist/Playwright	Transferred Off-Broadway in 1972.	
1972	The Duel	Composer/Lyricist/Playwright	An opera based on the lives of Alexander Hamilton and Aaron Burr	
1972	A Look at the Fifties	Composer/Lyricist/Playwright	Transferred to Arena Stage in 1973. Produced by Seattle Rep in 1974.	
1972	The Life of a Man	Composer/Lyricist/Playwright		
1972	The Making of Americans	Composer		
1973	Religion	Composer/Lyricist/Playwright		
1973	The Faggot	Composer/Lyricist/Playwright	Transferred Off-Broadway.	
1974	The Future	Composer/Lyricist/Playwright		
1974	Listen to Me	Composer		
1974	Christmas '74	Arranger		
1975	Why I Love New York	Composer/Lyricist/Playwright		
1976	The Bonus Army	Composer/Lyricist		
1976	Camp Meeting	Composer/Lyricist/Playwright	Originally titled Camp Meeting: 1840	
1976	A Meditation on Beauty	Composer/Lyricist/Playwright		
1976	A Manoir	Composer	Gertrude Stein adaptation	
1978	In Praise of Death	Composer/Lyricist/Playwright		
1979	Someone's in the Kitchen with Dinah	Composer/Lyricist/Playwright		
1979	Doctor Faustus Lights the Lights	Composer		
1980	The Agony of Paul	Composer/Lyricist/Playwright		
1981	T.S. Eliot: Midwinter Vigil(ante)	Composer/Lyricist/Playwright	Last show at Judson Poets' Theater	
1989	Máslova	Composer		

== Recordings ==
Released	Title	Label	Ref.
1966	Pomegranada	Patsan	
1967	In Circles	Avant Garde	
1969	Peace	Metromedia Records	
1969	Promenade	RCA Victor	
1972	Joan	Judson	
1973	The Faggot	Blue Pear	
1979	Christmas Rappings	Judson	
2003	Songs From W.C. and Other Theatre Songs of Al Carmines	Original Cast Records	

== Awards ==
Year	Award	Category	Work	Ref.
1964	Obie Award	Best Music	Home Movies and What Happened	
1968	Drama Desk	Best Composer	In Circles	
1968	Obie Award	Best Musical	In Circles	
1969	Drama Desk	Best Music	Peace	
1974	Drama Desk	Outstanding Score	The Faggot	
1979	Obie Award	Sustained Achievement		
2003	Robert Chesley Award for Gay and Lesbian Playwriting			
