= Promenade (musical) =

- cover of the 1969 original off-Broadway cast album
- Music: Al Carmines
- Lyrics: María Irene Fornés
- Book: María Irene Fornés
- Productions: 1965 Off-off Broadway; 1969 Off-Broadway; 1983 Off-Broadway; 2010 Concert; 2019 Encores!
- Awards: OBIE Award for Distinguished Plays

Promenade is an experimental musical comedy with book and lyrics by María Irene Fornés and music by Rev. Al Carmines. In a review in The New York Times for a 1983 New York revival, Stephen Holden linked the production to the Theatre of the Absurd: "This work, which suggests a mixture of Candide and Samuel Beckett viewed through Lewis Carroll's looking glass, is a little too avant-garde and absurdist to appeal to mainstream tastes. But in its odd way it's an exquisite piece of musical theater."

== Production History ==
The Promenade premiered on April 9, 1965 at the Judson Poets' Theater, where it played for three weekends.

It was then produced four years later, titled now as just Promenade, in a commercial run Off-Broadway at the Promenade Theatre (for which it was named), produced by Edgar Lansbury and Joseph Beruh, opening on June 4, 1969. The cast was led by Madeline Kahn, playing the role of the Servant. When Kahn left Promenade, claiming illness, she was replaced by Pamela Hall, who had just closed on Broadway as Nina in Jerry Herman's Dear World. Hall was understudied by Sandra Schaeffer, Later the role was played by Marie Santell. Pamela Hall went on to direct the revival of Promenade in 2010, which was produced by Original Cast member Edmund Gaynes. After a successful run, Promenade closed on January 18, 1970 after 259 performances.

On Monday, April 12, 2010, a semi-staged concert of Promenade was performed Off-Broadway at New York City's New World Stages (Stage 2) as the first of a planned series called Legacy: the Musicals of Off-Broadway. It was produced by Edmund Gaynes and directed by Pamela Hall. Ken Lundie was music director.

On July 10 and 11, 2019, as part of the Encores! Off Center series, a staged concert of Promenade was performed at New York City Center. The concert featured the original Off-Broadway orchestrations, and was directed by Laurie Woolery.

== Casts ==
Character	Off-off Broadway	Off-Broadway	Off-Broadway	Concert	Encores!
Character	1965	1969	1983	2010	2019
105	David Vaughn	Ty McConnell	Jason Graae	Brian Childers	James T. Lane
106	George Bartenieff	Gilbert Price	Tim Ewing	Tim Ewing	Kent Overshown
Jailer	Michael Elias	Pierre Epstein	Bill Buell	Gene Castle	Mark Bedard
Servant	Sheila Roy	Madeline Kahn	Regina O'Malley	Julie Cardia	Bryonha Parham
Miss I*	Gretal Cummings	Margot Albert	Susan Feldon	Victoria Mallory	Carmen Ruby Floyd
Miss O^{†}	Crystal Field	Carrie Wilson	Connie Coit	Neva Small	Soara-Joye Ross
Miss U^{§}	Joan Fairlee	Alice Playten	Marcie Shaw	Andrea McArdle	Marcy Harriell
Mr. R	Christopher Ross	Marc Allen III	Michael Halpern	Ron Spivak	Eddie Cooper
Mr. S^{‡}	Christopher Jones	Glenn Kezer	Hal Robinson	Jim Brochu	J.D. Webster
Mr. T	John Toland	Michael Davis	Mark McGrath	James Donegan	Daniel Everidge
Miss Cake	Florence Tarlow	Florence Tarlow	Judith Cohen	Virginia Seidel	Bonnie Milligan
Waiter	Howard Roy	Edmund Gaynes	Robert McNamara	Allen E. Read	Don Darryl Rivera
Dishwasher		Art Ostrin	James Hindman	Joshua Nicholson	Steve Routman
Mayor		George S. Irving	Mitchell Jason	Dale Radunz	Becca Blackwell
Mother	Jerri Banks	Shannon Bolin	Georgia Creighton	Loni Ackerman	Saundra Santiago

Notes:

*Originally named Miss C

^{†}Originally named Miss F

^{§}Originally named Miss B

^{‡}Originally named Mr. J

Notable replacements for 1969 Production:

105: Kenneth Carr, Paul Eichel

106: Tony Falco

Servant: Pamela Hall, Sandy Schaeffer, Marie Santell

Mother: Mary Jo Catlett

== Musical Numbers ==
ACT 1

- Promenade Theme—Orchestra
- Dig Dig Dig* -- 105 & 106
- Unrequited Love—Misses I, O, U, Messrs. R, S, T, Servant, Waiter, 105, 106
- Isn't That Clear—Mr. S with Ensemble
- Don't Eat It* -- Ensemble
- Four (Naked Lady) -- Misses I, O, U, Messrs. R, S, T, Servant, Waiter, 105, 106, Dishwasher
- Chicken Is He—Rosita
- The Moment Has Passed—Miss O
- A Flower—Miss I
- Rosita Rodriguez* -- Mayor
- Apres Vous* -- 105, 106, Jailor
- Bliss* -- Servant, 105, 106, and Ensemble
- The Cigarette Song—Servant, 105, 106
- Thank You* -- Dishwasher
- The Clothes Make The Man—Servant, 105, 106
- Two Little Angels—Mother, 105, 106
- The Passing of Time—105, 106
- Capricious and Fickle (You Cad) -- Miss U
- Crown Me—Servant, 105, 106

ACT 2

- Mr. Sidney N. Phelps* -- Waiter
- Madeline* -- Waiter
- Spring Beauties* -- Ensemble
- Apres Vous (reprise)* -- Ensemble
- A Poor Man (When I Was Born) -- 105, 106
- Why Not? (Promenade Theme)* -- Servant, 105, 106, Mother, Dishwasher, Waiter
- The Finger Song* -- Mr. R, Ensemble
- Little Fool—Mr. T, Ensemble
- Chardiz* -- Servant
- The Laughing Song* -- Ensemble
- A Mother's Love* -- Mother
- Listen, I Feel—Servant
- I Saw A Man—Mother
- All is Well in the City—105, 106, Ensemble

(*Not on the original cast recording)
