= In Circles (musical) =

- Music: Al Carmines
- Lyrics: Gertrude Stein
- Basis: A Circular Play by Stein
- Premiere: November 5, 1967: Cherry Lane Theatre
- Productions: 1967 off-Broadway; 1997 off-Broadway
- Awards: 1968 Obie

In Circles is an off-Broadway musical. The words were selected from the writings of Gertrude Stein, arranged and set to music by Al Carmines. It was first seen in the Judson Poets Theatre based at Judson Memorial Church (where Carmines was associate pastor) on October 13, 1967. It transferred to the Cherry Lane Theatre and opened there on November 5, 1967. It subsequently transferred to the Gramercy Arts Theatre where it continued on June 25, 1968.

== History ==
Carmines fashioned the libretto based on Stein's A Circular Play.

== Synopsis ==
The program provided a setting: "The time and the place: the present." There was no plot.

=== Roles ===
- Cousins (He has an army in his room) - Theo Barnes
- Dole (He plays the piano. They do not have a mechanical piano) - Al Carmines
- Mildred (As round as around as an apple) - Jacque Lynn Colton
- Mable (She serves tea and circles) - Lee Crespi
- George (He can think of kissing her) - George McGrath
- Sylvia (and flags) - Arlene Rothlein
- Jessie (Cut wood) - Elaine Summers
- Ollie (An Englishman from the United Kingdom) - David Vaughan
- The Citizen (An innocent abroad) - Arthur Williams
- Lucy Armitage (A lady of culture and understanding) - Nancy Zala

During its run David Tice replaced Al Carmines in the role of Dole. Lee Guilliatt replaced Elaine Summers in the role of Jessie.

== Productions ==
The original production was produced by Franklin de Boer and directed by Lawrence Kornfeld. The set was by Roland Turner and Johnnie Jones with lighting by Eric Gertner. Probably because Stein's partner, Alice B. Toklas had died earlier that year, all programs contained the line: "this production is for Alice B. Toklas."

== Response ==
=== Awards ===
In Circles won an Obie Award at the 1968 awards ceremony.

=== Critical reception ===
In the New York Times Clive Barnes said "...it was all about the sweetness and sadness of it all, and I loved it. There was no story, only words dropped in the air like cylinders of tear gas. Words for the sake of words, words for the sake of beauty, words for the sake of half-forgotten associations, phrases acting, Proust-like, opening doors of lost perception. And, oh yes, it was hilariously funny." Concerning the music, Barnes said: "Mr. Carmines must eat music in the morning instead of breakfast cereal, rather as Gertrude Stein once must have eaten words. His music is arrogantly eclectic, disgracefully tuneful and just right for the purpose. Influences of Verdi, Bizet, barbershop quartet, Weill, ragtime, spirituals and obviously all that jazz, float around in his music with happen unconcern about being influential. His music seems to know the nicest people, and it introduces them at the drop of a temperature."

The Variety critic was somewhat skeptical. "In Circles is not a play in the traditional sense. It's a free-form, free-associative, uninhibited, stylized series of fragments of language and music, more a succession of abstract setting exercises than a cohesive dramatic work. Accordingly, it requires a specialized taste to enjoy...The overall impression is a mixture of chi-chi obscurity and clever, tantalizing use of language." The critic did have positive words for the direction: "Lawrence Kornfeld's staging is impressive. He controls the flowing movement at all times.

After transferring in June 1968, critic Dan Sullivan wrote that the show "remains one of the most delightful shows in New York." After a brief comparison to the musical Hair, he continued: "'In Circles' is adventurous but polite. It wants to be liked." Sullivan attributed the show's success to Carmine's music and especially to Lawrence Kornfeld's direction. "By imposing an ever-moving and ever-interesting pattern of feeling of Miss Stein's apparent nonsense, Mr. Kornfeld gives the play shape and even an unspoken moral: that the words we use in talking with each other are almost ludicrously dependent on gesture and tone of voice for their emotional significance. By temporarily divorcing words from their meanings, In Circles also lets us revel in Miss Stein's words simply as pure sounds."

Writing in The New Yorker, Edith Oliver remarked on Carmine's music: "The songs, all by Mr. Carmines, vary from popular numbers and blues to gospel songs and Moonlight Sonata-ish Beethoven. This clever, tuneful music, which falls somewhere between parody and pastiche and yet is not quite either one, is entirely in keeping, and so are the dancing and tableaux and vaudeville and musical-comedy routines by Lawruence Kornfeld, the director." Oliver continued: "The characters belong together, yet each belongs to himself, and the actors who play them manage to be just anonymous enough, without ever quite losing their separate identities...they all catch the spirit of the show and never lose it." Oliver concludes: "Miss Stein's quirky lines glitter with meaning—for everybody. They are, of course, terribly funny, and the comedy is rooted in wisdom and poetry and pureheartedness. Non sequitur they may be but never nonsense. There is nothing trivial or silly here, and there is always the awareness that tragedy is just a hairbreadth away.

== Recordings ==
The original cast recording was released in 1968 on Avant-Garde Records, record number AV 108.
