= Howard Moody =

American Christian clergy

Howard Russell Moody (April 13, 1921 – September 12, 2012) was an American clergyman who served as a pastor at Judson Memorial Church in New York City for 35 years. He was also a longtime champion of civil rights and free expression.

== Biography ==
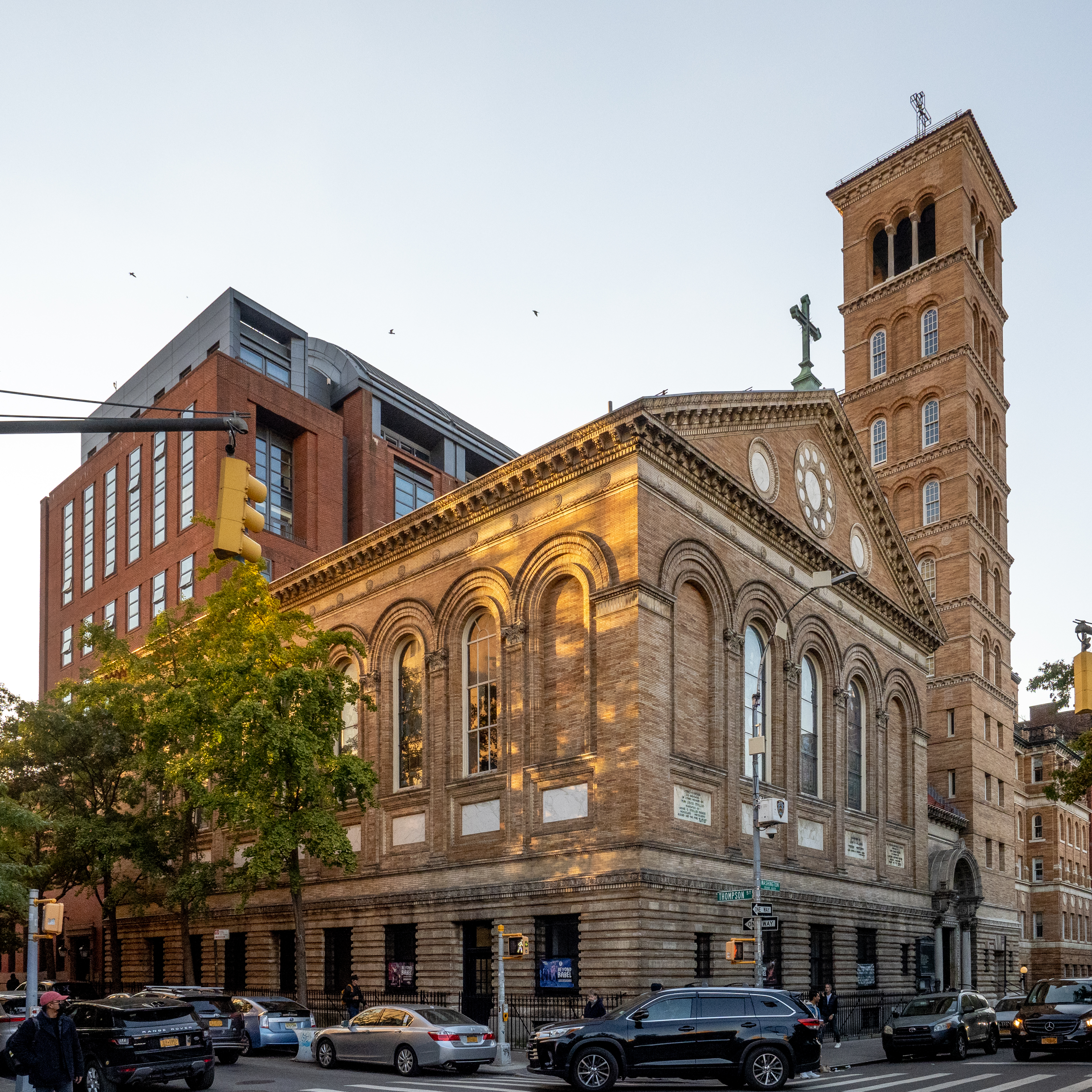
Judson Memorial Church

Born in 1921 in Dallas, Texas, Moody attended Baylor University, served in the United States Marine Corps during World War II, and received degrees from what is now the University of California, Santa Barbara and Yale Divinity School. He was ordained as an American Baptist at Judson Memorial Church in New York City, and was a pastor there from 1957 to 1992.

In 1967, six years before the Supreme Court recognized the constitutional right to abortion, Moody and other New York City clergy founded the Clergy Consultation Service on Abortion — "a group of 21 New York clergy who referred women for abortions when it was still illegal in every state." The group eventually grew into "a national network of 1,400 clergy members to help women seeking abortions. Three years later, when the state of New York legalized abortion, he helped establish a clinic to guide to his state women who wanted safe legal abortions." After Roe v. Wade in 1973, the network formed the Religious Coalition for Reproductive Choice (originally named Religious Coalition for Abortion Rights).

With church administrator Arlene Carmen, Moody organized support for sex workers. He started a drug-treatment clinic and established an AIDS support group at the church. With associate minister Al Carmines, Moody made Judson Memorial Church a center for free expression and avant-garde arts, sponsoring the Judson Dance Theater, the Judson Poets' Theater, and the Judson Gallery. He was a longtime supporter of LGBT rights and, in retirement, worked to reform drug laws. Moody preached that the role of the church was to be "a church for the world," that the church existed to equip its members to serve, not convert, the world, and he welcomed people of any—or no—faith to Judson Memorial Church.

Moody died in 2012 at the age of 91.
