= William H. Brackney =

American Baptist theologian (1948–2022)

The Reverend Doctor William H. Brackney
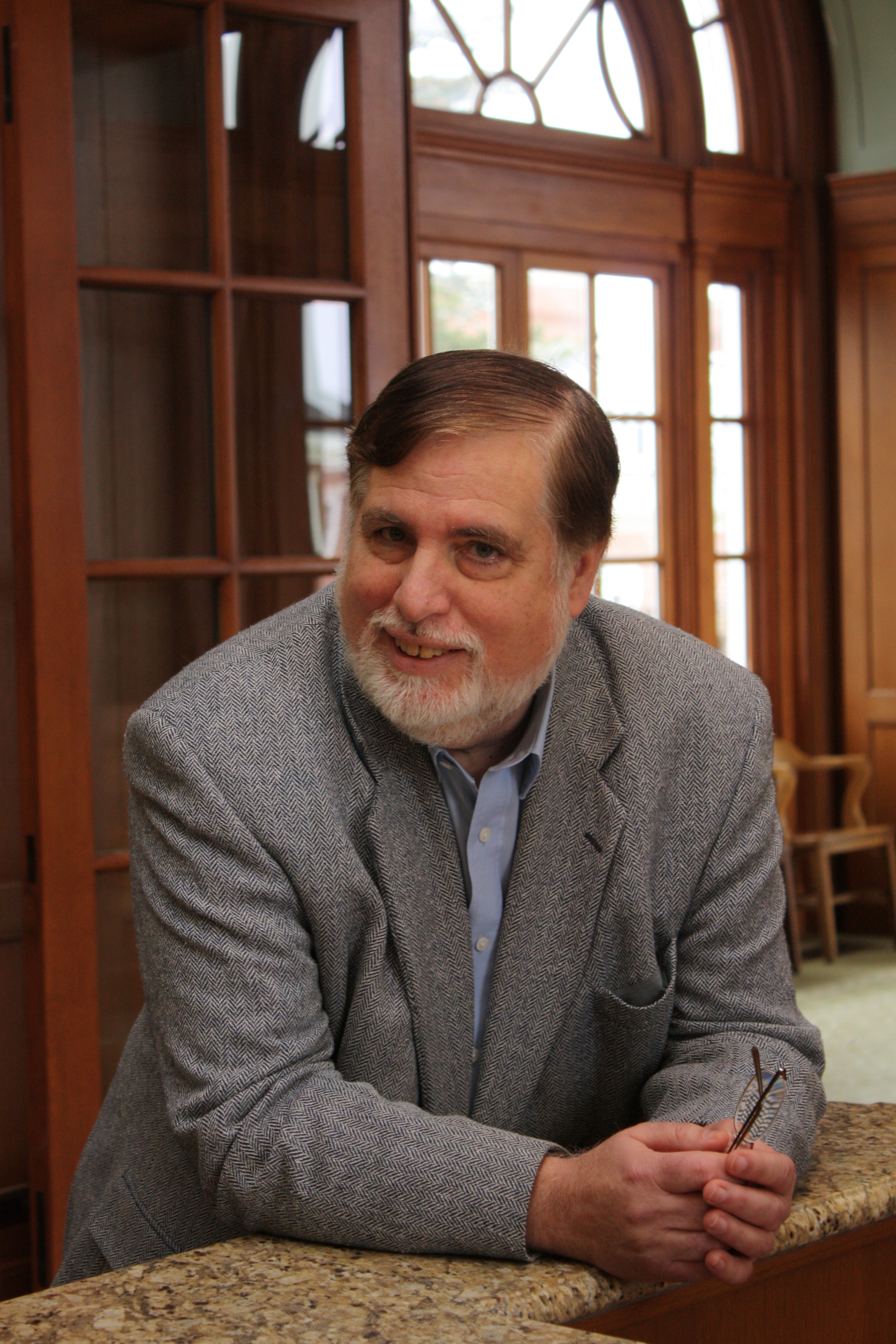
- Born: William Henry Brackney; January 30, 1948; Washington, DC, US
- Died: November 13, 2022 (aged 74); Wolfville, NS, Canada

Academic background
- Education: University of Maryland; Eastern Baptist Theological Seminary; Temple University
- Thesis: Religious Antimasonry (1976)

Academic work
- Discipline: History; theology
- Institutions: Houghton College; McMaster University; Baylor University; Acadia University

William Henry Brackney (January 30, 1948 – November 13, 2022) was the Millard R. Cherry Distinguished Professor of Christian Thought and Ethics Emeritus at Acadia University in Wolfville, Nova Scotia. He was an ordained Baptist minister, accredited by the Convention of Atlantic Baptist Churches and the American Baptist Churches, USA. He was previously the Dean of Theology at McMaster University in Hamilton, Ontario, and published numerous books and articles dealing with post-Reformation Protestant thought, particularly the Baptist and Radical Reformation traditions. Brackney did significant work in the areas of global ethics and human rights, and was the director of the Acadia Centre for Baptist and Anabaptist Studies (2008–2018). He was also a regular columnist for websites focused on ethics.

== Early life ==
Brackney was born on January 30, 1948 in Washington, DC, the second son of Samuel Harp Brackney and Mildred Braisted Pointer. His mother was of Methodist heritage; his father came from a line of Quakers; the two parents determined upon a Baptist orientation because of the outreach of a neighborhood congregation. The family's early years blended Southern Baptist and Northern (American) Baptist outlooks. William attended Gabriel DuVal Senior High School in Glenn Dale, Maryland and matriculated in the College of Arts and Sciences at the University of Maryland (College Park) with a scholarship to study astrophysics.

In 1967, he was admitted to the honors program in history and he defended a thesis in economic history, for which he received a BA (honors) degree. In 1970 he married Kathryn Godfrey Edens (born 1949) of Landover Hills, Maryland, and had two sons and a daughter.

He next completed an MA in religion from the Eastern Baptist Theological Seminary in Philadelphia in 1972. being awarded a prize for his thesis in Patristic Evidences. He received a second MA from Temple University in Philadelphia, after which he earned the Doctor of Philosophy (with distinction), his dissertation topic being Religious Antimasonry: The Genesis of a Political Party in 1976.

Mentors for his doctoral work at Temple included F. Ernest Stoeffler (Religion) and Joseph G. Rayback (History). He earned a Certificate in Modern Archives Administration from the US National Archives and Records Administration in 1979, also completing courses in library science at State University of New York at Geneseo. Throughout this period, Brackney served in leadership roles in Baptist and United Methodist churches in Texas, Pennsylvania, Washington, DC, and New York. He was ordained a Baptist minister in 1971, an elder in the United Methodist Church in 1976, and he carried recognition in the Wesleyan Church for a number of years, resulting from his appointment at Houghton College. Early in his career, he intentionally related to multiple denominational streams through his ministerial pursuits.

== Academic career ==
Brackney was an assistant professor in the History department of Houghton College for three years following his graduate studies, during which time he also served as the pastor of two United Methodist congregations in upstate New York (Limestone and Machias Charges). In 1979 he was appointed to the position of executive director of the American Baptist Historical Society, and Archivist of the American Baptist Churches USA, service which lasted until 1986. This role also involved being curator of the Samuel Colgate Baptist Historical Collection. In this period he was also an associate professor in church history at Colgate Rochester Divinity School, as well serving on the senior staff of the American Baptist Board of Educational Ministries (BEM) in Valley Forge, Pennsylvania. In 1986 he was named vice president and dean, and professor of the history of Christianity, at the Eastern Baptist Theological Seminary in Philadelphia.

For eleven years, from 1989 until 2000, Brackney was the principal and dean of McMaster Divinity College in Hamilton, Ontario, and was also the professor of historical theology. Concurrently, he was dean of the Faculty of Theology in McMaster University. During this tenure he was also a member of the Historical and Theological Departments of the Toronto School of Theology, an ecumenical cluster of eight institutions conjoined to the University of Toronto, for six years.

He left McMaster in 2000 to become a professor of religion at Baylor University, also serving as the chair for the department of Religion and the founding director of Baylor University's program in Baptist studies. Brackney also served as an adjunct professor at Baylor's George W. Truett Theological Seminary and for two years was the pastor of Blue Ridge Baptist Church in Marlin, Texas.

In 2006 he was appointed a distinguished professor at Acadia University in Wolfville, Nova Scotia, and the following year he was named the first occupant of The Millard R. Cherry Chair in Christian Theology and Ethics at Acadia Divinity College, Acadia University, a position from which he retired in 2017. In 2017 he was appointed Pioneer MacDonald Professor of Baptist Theology and Ethics and director of the William Carey Centre for Excellence in Ministry at Carey Theological College in Vancouver, British Columbia, also concurrently serving as adjunct professor of history and classics at Acadia University.

Brackney's research projects included "The General Baptist Movement in England 1606–1660" in Bibliotheca Dissidentium, and he served as the General Series Editor of the Baptists in Early North America series, 13 volumes to be published from 2011 to 2020 by Mercer University Press, and was general editor of the Published Works and Select Writings of Walter Rauschenbusch 3 volumes (2018–19). He was co-editor (with Rupen Das) and contributor to Poverty and the Poor in the World's Religious Traditions: Religious Responses to the Problem of Poverty published by Praeger Publishing in 2018, as well as The Spirit among the Dissenters, published by Wipf and Stock in 2019. Mercer University Press published in 2019 Crossing Baptist Boundaries: A Festschrift in Honour of William Henry Brackney (edited by Erich Geldbach). Concurrent with his academic appointments, he served Baptist congregations at Harmony, Lower Sackville, Newport, and Billtown [Nova Scotia], Canada.

== Death ==
Brackney died aged 74, on November 13, 2022 in Kentville, Nova Scotia.

== Publications ==
His published books include:

- William H. Brackney (1982). A traveler's guide to American Baptist historical sites. American Baptist Board of National Ministries and the American Baptist Historical Society.
- William H. Brackney (1994). The Baptists. ABC-CLIO. ISBN 978-0-275-94859-7.
- William H. Brackney (1995). Christian voluntarism in Britain and North America: a bibliography and critical assessment. Greenwood Press. ISBN 978-0-313-28421-2.
- William H. Brackney (1997). Christian voluntarism: theology and praxis. W.B. Eerdmans. ISBN 978-0-8028-0863-9.
- William H. Brackney (1997). Bridging cultures and hemispheres: the legacy of Archibald Reekie and Canadian Baptists in Bolivia. Smyth & Helwys Pub. ISBN 978-1-57312-164-4.
- William H. Brackney (1998). Baptist life and thought: a source book. Judson Press. ISBN 978-0-8170-1266-3.
- William H. Brackney (2004). A genetic history of Baptist thought: with special reference to Baptists in Britain and North America. Mercer University Press. ISBN 978-0-86554-913-5.
- William H. Brackney (2005). Human rights and the world's major religions. Praeger. ISBN 978-0-275-98425-0.
- William H. Brackney (2006). Baptists in North America: an historical perspective. Wiley-Blackwell. ISBN 978-1-4051-1865-1.
- William H. Brackney (2008). Congregation and campus: Baptists in higher education. Mercer University Press. ISBN 978-0-88146-130-5.
- William H. Brackney (2009). Historical Dictionary of the Baptists. Scarecrow Press. ISBN 978-0-8108-5622-6.
- William H. Brackney (2009). The A to Z of the Baptists. Scarecrow Pr Inc. ISBN 978-0-8108-7158-8.
- William H. Brackney (2010). Studying Christianity: The Critical Issues. CONTINUUM. ISBN 978-0-8264-9885-4.
- William H. Brackney (2012). Historical Dictionary of Radical Christianity. Rowman & Littlefield. ISBN 978-0-8108-7179-3.
