= Harriet Sohmers Zwerling =

American writer (1928–2019)

Harriet Sohmers Zwerling (March 26, 1928 – June 21, 2019) was an American writer and artist's model.

== Biography ==
She attended Black Mountain College and lived in Paris in the 1950s as part of the bohemian expatriate scene centered on James Baldwin, with whom she shared space in a literary magazine called New Story.

She translated a novel by the Marquis de Sade for Maurice Girodias' Olympia Press and worked for the International Herald Tribune. In 1959, she moved to New York City and was a part of the literary scene there, publishing stories, (one in the anthology The Bold New Women issued by Fawcett), co-editing the Provincetown Review and working as an artist's model for some of New York's most important painters. She was bisexual and had a few love relationships with women, including María Irene Fornés from 1954 to 1957, and then Susan Sontag until 1958.

In 1963, she married merchant sailor and bohemian Louis Zwerling and had a son, the musician Milo Z. She taught at a school in Greenpoint, Brooklyn for 28 years. In 2003, a collection of her writings, Notes of a Nude Model & Other Pieces, was published. She appears in the documentary Still Doing It about the sex lives of older women.

In 2014, she published Abroad: An Expatriate's Diaries, 1950–1959, a book based on her diaries from that period when she lived in Paris. She also appeared in the documentary Regarding Susan Sontag, which was shown at the Tribeca Film Festival in April 2014.

Zwerling died on June 21, 2019, at the age of 91.
