= Sarita (play) =

Sarita is a play/musical by Maria Irene Fornes. It was originally performed at INTAR, 420 West End Street in New York City on January 18, 1984. The play tells the story of the fiery-tempered Sarita Fernandez, who is gradually torn apart by her sexual desires and moral values to the point of insanity.

== Plot summary ==
Preamble: Sarita Is Fit. The play begins with Sarita as a 13-year-old schoolgirl living in New York City in 1939, sitting with her friend Yeye in her apartment, telling fortunes. Sarita is flustered because she saw her crush, Julio, getting aroused while talking to a different girl. Yeye assures Sarita that he was really thinking of her when he got aroused, but Sarita vows that she will date many boys just like Julio. In the next scene, Sarita, now 14 years old, tells her mother, Fela, that she is pregnant.

Fela at first thinks her tenant, Fernando (an older man), has raped Sarita, but Sarita confessed that she'd been seeing many men and boys and she doesn't know who gave her the baby. Fela tries to solve the problem by trying to get Sarita to marry Fernando so her child will be 'legal.' Both Fernando and Sarita refuse, Sarita because she still wants to go to school, and Fernando because Sarita is a "rude brat." Although we don't ever see a pregnancy develop or a child throughout the play, Sarita does give birth to a son, Melo, whom she leaves in her mother's care. After giving birth, Sarita runs away from home, promising that she'll send money to her son Melo.

Later, we see that Sarita and Julio have become lovers, although Julio constantly 'leaves' Sarita, which frustrated her as she gets older. Sarita attempts to write several goodbye letters over the years, but she always ends up forgiving Julio. One night, she finally finishes a good-bye letter and goes to the Empire State Building to commit suicide. But a young soldier named Mark stops her and falls in love with her.

For most of the second act, Sarita struggles internally with her love for her new husband, Mark, and her lingering passion and desire for Julio. One night, after Sarita and Julio have sex, Julio begins harassing Sarita, and tells her that if she wants to keep the affair hidden from Mark, she needs to pay him. Sarita, insane with anger, frustration, and rage, stabs Julio fatally and instantly regrets it. Julio dies in her arms.

The final scene takes place in a mental hospital in which Sarita is a patient. Sarita talks with Fernando, and when Mark comes to see her, despite all that she has done against him, she realizes that she belonged with Mark all along. The pair clasps hands as Sarita inquires fearfully about her future and "what they will do" to her in the asylum.

== Theme: Love vs. Lust ==
The three main male characters, Julio, Mark, and Fernando each represent a potential path for Sarita's affections and love.

Sarita is in a constant struggle between love and lust, love winning out in the end. Julio represents lust, which, while appealing and desirable, cannot satisfy Sarita completely. Mark, is willing to stand by Sarita come what may (as demonstrated by the finale scene in the mental asylum).

Fernando, on the other hand, represents necessity, as seen when Fela wants him to marry Sarita (despite the enormous age difference) so Sarita's child can have a father.

== Original Cast ==
Sarita: Sheila Dabney

Fela: Carmen Rosario

Julio: Michael Carmine

Mark: Rohan Loser

Yeye: Blanca Camacho

Fernando: Rodolfo Diaz

Juan (a drummer): Sanjeev Josh
