= Arlene Carmen =

American activist and church administrator

Arlene Carmen (April 5, 1936 – October 9, 1994) was an American activist and church administrator in New York City. Raised in the Bronx in a Jewish family, she graduated from City College and became administrator of Judson Memorial Church in Greenwich Village in 1967. There she became administrator of the National Clergy Consultation Service on Abortion, a network of Protestant and Jewish clergy who referred women for safe abortions before Roe v. Wade legalized abortion nationwide. She herself vetted some of the physicians used by the group by posing as a pregnant woman, and she maintained lists of physicians who were approved and those who were to be avoided. She and Judson's head minister, Howard Moody, started a project to support sex workers, offering referrals, clothing, lemonade, and cookies. In 1978, she was arrested along with sex workers in Times Square and released 22 hours later. She was also an organizer an early AIDS support group at Judson. Carmen was co-author of Abortion Counseling and Social Change: From Illegal Act to Medical Practice with Howard Moody (Valley Forge, PA: Judson Press, 1973) and Working Women: The Subterranean World of Street Prostitution with Howard Moody (New York: Harper & Row, 1985).
