= Clergy Consultation Service on Abortion =

Clandestine abortion support network of U.S. clergy (1967–1973)

The Clergy Consultation Service on Abortion (CCS) was a group of American clergy that counseled and referred people to licensed doctors for safe abortions before the Supreme Court's decision in Roe v. Wade made abortion legal nationwide. Started in 1967 by a group of 21 Protestant ministers and Jewish rabbis in New York City, the group operated out of Judson Memorial Church and grew to incorporate chapters in thirty-eight states with some 3,000 clergy as members. By the time of the Roe v. Wade decision in 1973, it is estimated that the Clergy Consultation Service had nationally referred at least 450,000 people for safe abortions. The Clergy Consultation Service also started Women's Services, an abortion clinic in New York City, in 1970 after statewide legislation made abortion legal in New York State.

== Origins ==
In the mid-1960s, a group of liberal New York Protestant ministers and Jewish rabbis met regularly at Washington Square Methodist Church to discuss questions of social justice. Starting in 1965, New York State Assemblyman Albert H. Blumenthal led an effort to reform state abortion laws. As reform efforts failed, journalist and abortion activist Lawrence Lader urged the clergy group to offer abortion referrals.

The clergy group invited women who had had abortions, gynecologists, and lawyers from the New York Civil Liberties Union to speak to them and provide guidance for setting up the referral service. The group set rules for their work: counselors must be clergy, to confer the right of confidentiality; they would counsel in person in their regular offices; they would refer only to licensed physicians; they would refer out of state, to confuse jurisdictions; and there would be no charge.

The group appointed Rev. Howard Moody, minister of Judson Memorial Church, as spokesperson. They chose to use the word "abortion" in their name as a way to remove stigma. They set up an answering machine at Judson with an outgoing message giving the names and contact information of two clergy available that week. Moody gave the group's first interview to the New York Times, and the article about their launch, naming the 21 clergy members, appeared on page 1 on May 22, 1967.

The administrator of the New York City CCS, and, later, the national group, was Judson's church administrator, Arlene Carmen. She and other women visited many of the abortion providers themselves, posing as pregnant women, to check the clinical conditions and procedure used, as well as the demeanor of the doctors. Carmen maintained lists of approved physicians and those to be avoided.

== Expansion ==
The service received hundreds of calls during the first weeks of operation, including many from women outside of New York. Since all counseling was done in person, the New York CCS soon identified a need for similar services elsewhere. Moody asked clergy colleagues in Philadelphia and Chicago to start CCS chapters there. Clergy from New Jersey and Los Angeles read about the New York group and contacted them about forming local groups. By 1972, there were chapters in 38 states, and by the time the Roe v. Wade decision made abortion legal nationwide in January 1973, some 3,000 CCS counselors had referred as many as 450,000 women for safe abortions.

== Successors ==
On July 1, 1970, abortion became legal in New York State. On that day, the Clergy Consultation Service of New York opened the first freestanding outpatient abortion clinic in the U.S., the Center for Reproductive and Sexual Health (later known as Women's Services), under the medical direction of Dr. Hale Harvey III and the administration of graduate student Barbara Pyle. Harvey had performed abortions for CCS-referred patients in New Orleans and was invited by the CCS to set up the clinic in New York. At Women's Services, abortions cost as little as $25 for patients in economic need, and women were referred there by CCS chapters throughout the east.

At the same time, the New York CCS was concerned that demand for legal abortion in New York City would be much greater than hospitals were equipped to provide. Moody and Carmen established a watchdog group called Clergy and Lay Advocates for Hospital Abortion Performance, headed by Barbara Krasner. The group offered a referral to anyone who had difficulty getting an abortion at New York City hospitals and amassed statistics indicating that the hospital system did not provide timely treatment.

In 1973, following Roman Catholic opposition to legalized abortion, a group of Protestant and Jewish clergy formed an education and advocacy organization, the Religious Coalition for Abortion Rights (RCAR), which in 1993 broadened to become the Religious Coalition for Reproductive Choice (RCRC). Former CCS members around the country formed or joined state chapters of the group.
