= María Irene Fornés =

American playwright (1930–2018)

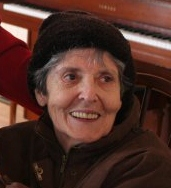
- Fornés circa November 2011
- Born: May 14, 1930; Havana, Cuba
- Died: October 30, 2018 (aged 88); New York City, US
- Citizenship: American (1951)
- Occupations: playwright; director; professor
- Organization(s): New York University; INTAR Theater
- Notable work: Fefu and Her Friends (1977); Mud (1983); Sarita (1984); And What of the Night? (1990); Letters from Cuba (2000)
- Partners: Harriet Sohmers; Susan Sontag
- Awards: 9 Obie Awards (1965, 1977, 1979, 1982, 1984, 1985, 1988, 2000); Rockefeller Foundation Fellowship (1971, 1984); Guggenheim Fellowship (1972); National Endowment for the Arts Fellowship (1974, 1984, 1985); Pulitzer Prize for Drama, Finalist (1990); Robert Chesley Award (2001); PEN/Laura Pels Theater Award (2002)

María Irene Fornés (May 14, 1930 – October 30, 2018) was a Cuban and American playwright, director, and teacher. She was an important figure in the development of New York’s off-off-Broadway movement and Downtown Arts Scene. Over the course of her career, she wrote more than forty plays and musicals, won nine Obie Awards, and mentored "thousands of playwrights across the globe". Her play What of the Night? was a finalist for the Pulitzer Prize for Drama in 1990, the first work by a Latino playwright to receive said distinction. Signature Theatre Company devoted its 1999–2000 season to her work, while The Public Theater presented a fourteen-play "Fornés Marathon" in 2018.

Her notable works include Promenade (1965), Fefu and Her Friends (1977), Mud (1983), Sarita (1984), and Letters from Cuba (2000). Her plays have been produced both on and off Broadway, as well as internationally". Many theater luminaries—including Tony Kushner, Caryl Churchill, Paula Vogel, Lanford Wilson, and Edward Albee—have acknowledged her influence. Wilson remarked that her work "has no precedents; it isn’t derived from anything… She’s the most original of us all". Vogel similarly noted, "In the work of every American playwright at the end of the 20th century, there are only two stages: before you have read María Irene Fornés – and after".

Fornés taught playwriting at New York University for thirty-three years (1966–1999) and received an honorary Doctor of Letters from Bates College in 1992. As the director of INTAR Theatre’s Hispanic Playwrights-in-Residence Lab, she mentored multiple generations of Latino playwrights, including Cherríe Moraga, Migdalia Cruz, Nilo Cruz, Caridad Svich, and Eduardo Machado. Notices of her death in The New York Times, Los Angeles Times, and Vogue described Fornés as "a pioneer of the American theater", "a totemic figure to many academics and artists", and "among the most influential Latinx voices of the 20th century".

== Life and career ==
=== Early years ===
Fornés was born on May 14, 1930, in Havana, Cuba, the youngest of six children. After her father Carlos Fornés died in 1945, she immigrated to the United States at the age of 15 with her mother (Note: Her mother Carmen remained a presence in her life. She attended the Obie Awards ceremony when passed the age of 100.) and one sister. She became a U.S. citizen in 1951. When she first arrived in the US, Fornés worked in the Capezio shoe factory. Dissatisfied, she took classes to learn English and became a translator. At the age of 19, she became interested in painting and began her formal education in abstract art, studying with Hans Hofmann in New York City and Provincetown, Massachusetts.

By 1954, Fornés had met the writer and artist's model Harriet Sohmers. They became lovers and moved to Paris where Fornés planned to study painting. There she was struck by the world premiere production of Samuel Beckett's Waiting for Godot. She later told an interviewer: "I didn't speak any French at all. But I understood the world in which it took place, I got the rhythm. And it turned my life upside down". She lived with Sohmers in Paris for three years, and after their relationship ended Fornés returned to New York City in 1957.

=== Early writing ===
Fornés's first step toward playwriting involved translating letters she brought with her from Cuba that were written to her great-grandfather from a cousin in Spain. She turned the letters into a play called La Viuda (The Widow, 1961). Never translated into English, it premiered in Spanish in New York. She never staged the play herself, and it is considered "a precursor" to her work as a playwright.

In 1959, about the time she was working on La Viuda, Fornés entered into a romantic relationship with the writer Susan Sontag. Fornés later described how, in the spring of 1961, her career as a playwright was launched when she tried to help Sontag, who was frustrated by her inability to make progress on a novel she was writing. Fornés, by her own account, demonstrated how easy writing can be by sitting at their kitchen table and taking cues found at random in a cookbook to start a short story: "I might never have thought of writing if I hadn't pretended I was going to show Susan how easy it was". Their relationship ended in 1963.

=== Playwright ===
The play considered her first as a playwright was There! You Died, first produced by San Francisco's Actor's Workshop in 1963. An absurdist two-character play, it was later renamed Tango Palace and produced in 1964 at New York City's Actors Studio. The piece is an allegorical power struggle between the two central characters: Isidore, a clown, and Leopold, a naive youth. Like much of her writing, Tango Palace stresses character rather than plot. With it, Fornés also established her production style, which required her participation in the entire staging process.

The Successful Life of 3 and Promenade followed in 1965. The pair earned Fornés her first Obie Award in 1965. Both of the New York Times senior theater critics were enthusiastic in their reviews of Promenade. Clive Barnes called it "a joy from start to finish" and praised the show's "dexterity, wit and compassion". Walter Kerr highlighted the collaboration of lyricist and composer along with the show's manipulation of stereotypes and Brechtian juxtapositions that left him admiring the mockery of conventions that evoked affection for those same conventions: "The tenderness is as actual as the slyness.... Inside a put-on, some old pleasures have been restored".

She came close to having her work performed on Broadway in April 1966, when Jerome Robbins directed The Office starring Elaine May. But Fornes was so unhappy with how the production misrepresented her vision that she exercised her contractual right to withdraw the script. The show closed after ten previews and she never approached Broadway again.

In Fefu and Her Friends (1977), Fornés begins and ends with the audience seated as a single group facing a traditional stage. But she also experimented with deconstructing the stage by setting scenes in four locations simultaneously and having the audience, divided into four groups, view each scene in turn. The scenes repeat until each group has seen all four scenes. First produced by the New York Theater Strategy at the Relativity Media Lab, the play's eight women gather to plan a fundraising presentation, real women engaged in a banal activity. The play is considered to be feminist by critics and scholars, in that it offers a woman's perspective on female characters and their thoughts, feelings, and relationships. Fornés called it "a pro-feminine play rather than a feminist play", while one critic praises its exploration of the possibilities and risks of women's friendships.

In 1982, Fornés earned a special Obie for Sustained Achievement; in 1984, she received two Obies for writing and for directing three of her own plays: The Danube (1982), Mud (1983), and Sarita (1984). Mud, first produced in 1983 at the Padua Hills Playwright's Festival in California, explores the impoverished lives of Mae, Lloyd and Henry, who become involved in a love triangle. Fornés contrasts the desire to seek more in life with what is actually possible under given conditions. She described Mud as "a feminist play because the central character is a woman, and the theme is one that writers usually deal with through a male character.... It has nothing to do with men and women. It has to do with poverty and isolation and a mind. This mind is in the body of a female". Mud exemplifies Fornés' familiar technique of portraying a female character's rise opposed by male characters. The piece also explores the way the mind experiences poverty and isolation.

In Fornés' exploration of the world of Hispanic women in the US, the title character of Sarita begins in 1939 as a 13-year-old unwed mother in the South Bronx and at the end of the play enters a psychiatric hospital at the age of 21. Some dialogue is in Spanish as Sarita contends with the two men in her life, the exploitative Julio and her rescuer the Anglo Mark. Afro-Cuban religion and nostalgia for Cuba provide the drama's background. Distorted scenery in later scenes places Sarita in a context that reflects her psychological state.

The Conduct of Life (1985) was another Obie winner, as was Abingdon Square (1988), both deemed Best New American Play. Fornés was also a finalist for the 1990 Pulitzer Prize for Drama with her play And What of the Night?

In 2000, Letters From Cuba had its premiere with the Signature Theatre Company in New York, which devoted its 1999–2000 season to her work. (Note: The Signature Theatre opened its season with a double bill of Mud and Drowning, continued with the New York premiere of Enter the Night, and ended with the world premiere of Letters from Cuba directed by the author.) It was the last play she completed before health problems ended her writing career. For the first time, Fornés drew upon personal experience. She had exchanged letters with her own brother in Cuba for 30 years, and in the play a young man in Cuba reads from his letters to his sister, a dancer in New York. It lasts about an hour and is constructed of fragmentary moments, each scene just long enough to establish a mood. The heartache of separation is juxtaposed with the struggle of young artists and the ending offers an ecstatic resolution. Letters From Cuba was recognized by the Obie Awards with a special citation for Fornés.

=== Teaching and influence ===
In August 2018, as Fornes' death neared, a 12-hour marathon performance of excerpts from her works was staged at New York's Public Theater.

Fornés became a recognized force in both Hispanic-American and experimental theatre in New York. Her greatest influence may have come through her legendary playwriting workshops, which she taught to aspiring writers across the globe. Locally in New York City, as the director of the INTAR Hispanic Playwrights-in-Residence Lab in the 1980s and early '90s, she mentored a generation of Latin playwrights, including Cherríe Moraga, Migdalia Cruz, Nilo Cruz, Caridad Svich, and Eduardo Machado.

Pulitzer Prize-winning writers Tony Kushner, Paula Vogel, Lanford Wilson, Sam Shepard, and Edward Albee credit Fornés as an inspiration and influence. "Her work has no precedents; it isn't derived from anything", Lanford Wilson once said of her, "she's the most original of us all". Paula Vogel contends: "In the work of every American playwright at the end of the 20th century, there are only two stages: before she has read Maria Irene Fornes and after". Tony Kushner concludes: "Every time I listen to Fornes, or read or see one of her plays, I feel this: she breathes, has always breathed, a finer, purer, sharper air".

At her death, Charles McNulty, theater critic of the Los Angeles Times, called her "the most influential American dramatist whose work hasn't become a staple of the mainstream repertoire" and added: "Although she was not as well-known as fellow theater maverick Sam Shepard, her playwriting exerted a similar magnetic pull on generations of theater artists inspired by her liberating example".

=== Personal life ===
Fornés was a lesbian and included gays and lesbians in several of her plays. She said, however, that she was not focused on examining such characters: "Being gay is not like being of another species. If you're gay, you're a person. What interests me is the mental and organic life of an individual. I'm writing about how people deal with things as an individual, not as a member of a type".

As Fornés' reputation grew in avant-garde circles, she became friendly with Norman Mailer and Joseph Papp and reconnected with Harriet Sohmers.

She was diagnosed with Alzheimer's disease in 2005 and lived the rest of her life in care facilities. Fornés died at the Amsterdam Nursing Home in Manhattan on October 30, 2018.

== Documentary and adaptations ==
A documentary feature about Fornés called The Rest I Make Up by Michelle Memran was made in collaboration with Fornés. It focuses on her creative life in the years after she stopped writing due to dementia. The film's title is a line from Promenade. It premiered at Doc Fortnight 2018, the annual festival of New York's Museum of Modern Art.

Philip Glass composed a 30-minute chamber opera for three singers accompanied by keyboard and harp based on Fornés' play Drowning.

== Works ==
- La Viuda (The Widow) (1961)
- There! You Died (1963) (produced as Tango Palace in 1964)
- The Successful Life of 3: A Skit for Vaudeville (1965)
- Promenade (music by Al Carmines) (1965)
- The Office (1966)
- The Annunciation (1967)
- A Vietnamese Wedding (1967)
- Dr. Kheal (1968)
- Molly's Dream (music by Cosmos Savage) (1968)
- The Red Burning Light, or Mission XQ3 (music by John Vauman) (1968)
- Aurora (music by John Fitzgibbon) (1972)
- The Curse of the Langston House (1972)
- Cap-a-Pie (From Head to Foot), in Spanish and English, music by José Raúl Bernardo) (1975)
- Washing (1976)
- Fefu and Her Friends (1977)
- Lolita in the Garden (1977)
- In Service (1978)
- Eyes on the Harem (1979)
- Evelyn Brown (A Diary) (1980) (Note: Fornés constructed this piece from the hand-written diary of Evelyn Brown (1854–1934), who recorded her work at repetitive tasks in someone else's home in 1909 in rural Melvin Village, New Hampshire. Fornés described it as an "adaptation" of Brown's work.)
- A Visit (1981)
- The Danube (1982)
- Mud (1983)
- Sarita (music by Leon Odenz) (1984)
- No Time (1984)
- The Conduct of Life (1985)
- A Matter of Faith (1986) (Note: An enactment of the 1431 trial of Joan of Arc. "Sheila Dabney, an Obie-winning actress and a frequent collaborator, recalled being so affected by playing Joan of Arc in Ms. Fornés's A Matter of Faith that she would hide under the stage after performances, shellshocked and speechless. 'Instead of hitting anger in a surface kind of way, we'd explore it for a minute and twist on its ear and bend it back or open its jaws too wide,' she said".)
- Lovers and Keepers (music by Tito Puente and Fernando Rivas) (1986)
- Drowning (adapted from a story by Chekhov) (1986)
- Art (1986)
- The Mothers (1986; revised as Nadine in 1989)
- Abingdon Square (1987)
- Hunger (1988)
- And What of the Night? (four one-act plays: Nadine, Springtime, Lust and Hunger) (1989)
- Oscar and Bertha (1992)
- Terra Incognita (an opera libretto with a piano score by Roberto Sierra, 90 minutes) (1992)
- Enter the Night (1993)
- Summer in Gossensass (1995)
- Manual for a Desperate Crossing (1996)
- Balseros (Rafters) (opera libretto based on Manual for a Desperate Crossing, music by Robert Ashley) (1997)
- Letters from Cuba (2000)

== Direction, adaptation, and translation ==
- Blood Wedding (translated and adapted Bodas de Sangre by Federico García Lorca) (1980)
- Life is a Dream (translated, adapted and directed La vida es sueño by Pedro Calderón de la Barca) (1981)
- Cold Air (translated, adapted and directed a play by Virgilio Piñera) (1985)
- Uncle Vanya (revised Marian Fell's translation of the play by Anton Chekhov and directed) (1987)

== Awards and recognition ==
- 1961 John Hay Whitney Foundation fellowship
- 1965 Obie Award for Distinguished Plays: Promenade and The Successful Life of 3
- 1972 Guggenheim Fellowship, Drama and Performance Art
- 1977 Obie Award for Playwriting: Fefu and Her Friends
- 1979 Obie Award for Directing: Eyes on the Harem
- 1982 Obie Award for Sustained Achievement
- 1984 Obie Awards for Playwriting: The Danube, Sarita, Mud
- 1984 Obie Awards for Directing: The Danube, Sarita, Mud
- 1985 Obie Award for Best New American Play: The Conduct of Life
- 1985 American Academy and Institute of Arts and Letters award in literature
- 1986 Playwrights U.S.A. Award for translation of Virgilio Piñera's Cold Air
- 1988 Obie Award for Best New American Play: Abingdon Square
- 1990 New York State Governor's Arts Award
- 1992 Honorary doctorate, Bates College
- 2000 Obie Award Special Citation for Letters From Cuba
- 2001 Robert Chesley Award, for lifetime achievement
- 2002 PEN/Laura Pels International Foundation for Theater Award for a Master American Dramatist

== See also ==
- Cuban American literature
- List of Cuban-American writers
- List of Cuban Americans
