= George Boardman (missionary) =

Christian missionary (1801–1831)

George Dana Boardman
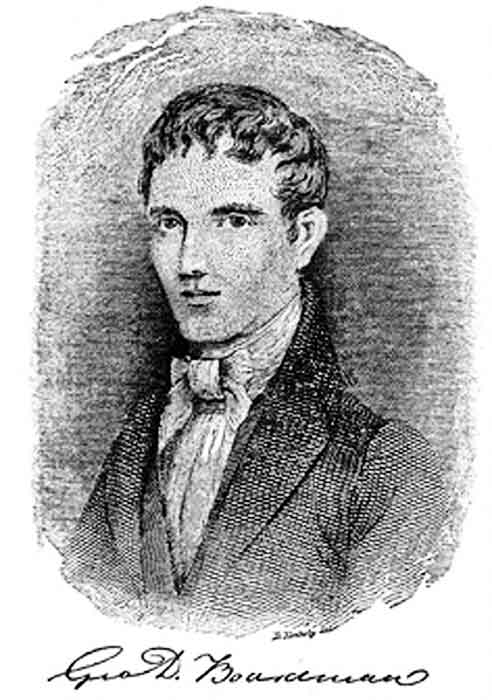
- Missionary to Burma
- Born: February 8, 1801; Livermore, Maine
- Died: February 11, 1831 (aged 30); Tavoy, Burma (now Dawei, Myanmar)

George Dana Boardman (February 8, 1801 – February 11, 1831) was an American missionary.

== Life ==
He was born in Livermore, Maine, the son of the Rev. Sylvanus Boardman. He attended Colby College, and was the school's first graduate in 1822. He served as tutor for a year at Colby, then continued his education at Andover Theological Seminary. On February 16, 1825, he was ordained a Baptist minister in West Yarmouth, Maine. Rev. Jeremiah Chaplin, President of Colby College, spoke at his ordination. Boardman married Sarah Hall on July 4, 1825.

On July 16, the couple sailed for Calcutta, where they arrived on 2 December 1825. After acquiring the Burmese language, he entered upon his labors at Maulmain in May 1827, and founded a mission which became the central point of all the Baptist missions in Burma. In April 1828, he established a mission at Tavoy, where he soon afterward baptized Ko Tha Byu, a Karen convert, whose labors were very successful among his countrymen. On 5 February 1828, Boardman set out on a tour among the Karen villages, and met with such success that he determined on a systematic course of itinerary labor. On these trips, he was usually accompanied by Ko Tha Byu or some other convert.

His exertions occasioned the loss of his health and brought on his early death by consumption. His widow married the Rev. Adoniram Judson, also a missionary. He and Sarah had a son also named George Dana Boardman, often referred to as "the Younger".

A residence and dining hall at his alma mater, Colby College, is named "Dana" in his honor.
