= Ann Hasseltine Judson =

American missionary

Ann Judson
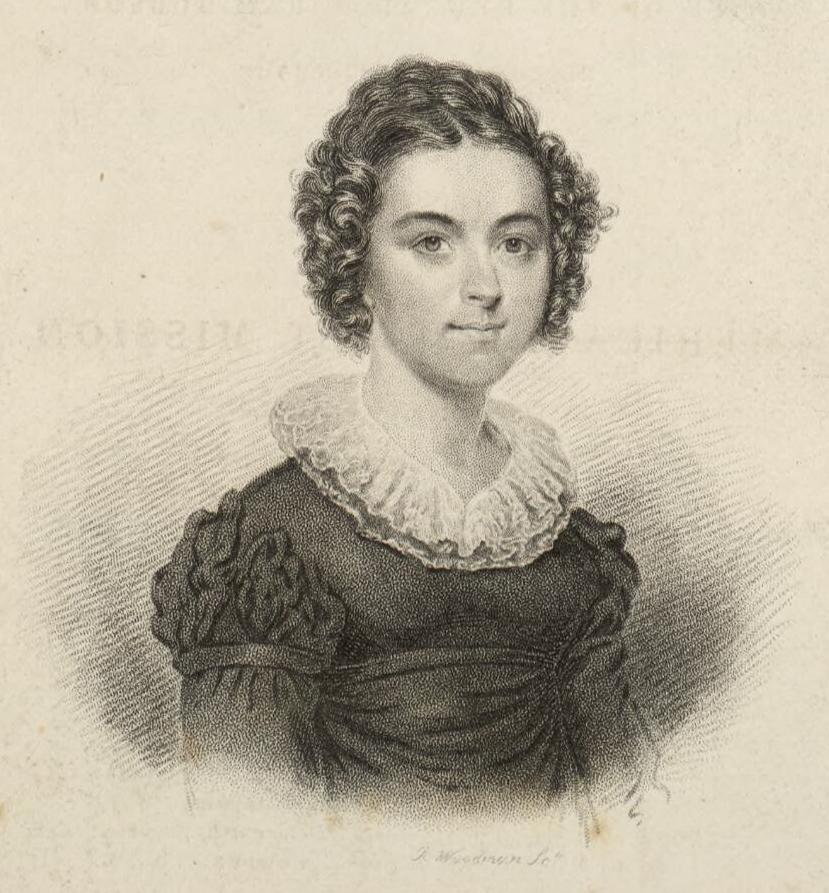
- Ann "Nancy" H. Judson
- Born: Ann Hasseltine; December 22, 1789; Bradford, Massachusetts
- Died: October 24, 1826 (aged 36); Amherst, Burma (now Kyaikkami, Myanmar)
- Known for: Missionary work in Burma
- Spouse: Adoniram Judson

Ann Hasseltine Judson (December 22, 1789 – October 24, 1826), nicknamed "Nancy", was one of the first female American foreign missionaries.

== Biography ==
Ann Hasseltine attended the Bradford Academy and during a revival there read Strictures on the Modern System of Female Education by Hannah More, which led her to "seek a life of 'usefulness'". Born in Bradford, Massachusetts a teacher from graduation until marriage. Her father, John Hasseltine, was a deacon at the church that hosted the gathering that, in 1810, founded the American Board of Commissioners for Foreign Missions and, according to Ann's sister, the family first met her husband Adoniram Judson at that time.

She married Adoniram in 1812, and two weeks later they embarked on their mission trip to India. The following year, they moved on to Burma.

She had three pregnancies. The first ended in a miscarriage while moving from India to Burma; their son Roger was born in 1815 and died at eight months of age, and their third child, Maria, lived for only six months after her mother's death. While in Burma, the couple's first undertaking was to acquire the language of the locals. Missionary efforts followed, with the first local converting to Christianity in 1819. Due to liver problems, Ann returned to the United States briefly in 1822–23.

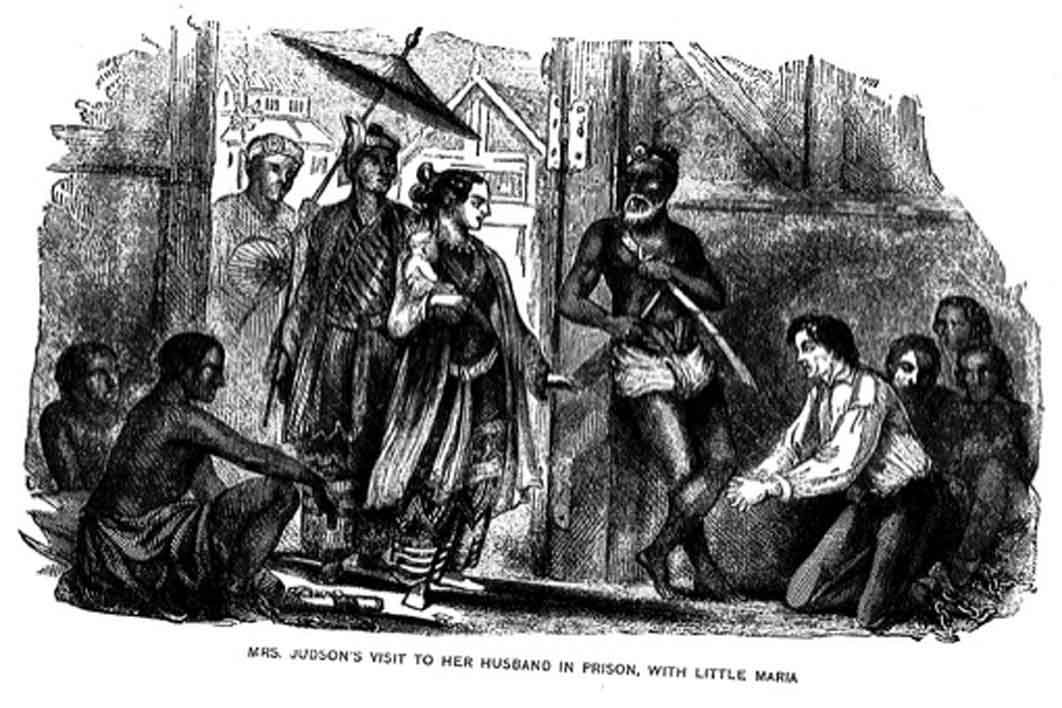
Nancy visits Adoniram in prison

During the first Anglo-Burmese war (1824–26), her husband was imprisoned for 17 months under suspicion of being an English spy, and Ann moved into a shack outside the prison gates so as to support her husband. She lobbied vigorously for months to convince the authorities to release her husband and his fellow prisoners, but her efforts were unsuccessful. She also sent food and sleeping mats to the prisoners to make their time in prison more bearable. During this time, Ann wrote stories of life on the mission field and the struggles she faced. She wrote tragic descriptions of child marriages, female infanticide, and the trials of the Burmese women who had no rights except for the ones their husbands gave them. Ann's health was fragile by the time her husband was released. Her efforts to be near him when he was moved to a new location, all while she was nursing a newborn child, had involved strenuous travel and living conditions that may have contributed to her illness. After her husband's release, they both remained in Burma to continue their work. Ann died at Amherst, Lower Burma, of smallpox in 1826.

Hopia tree near the grave of Ann Hasseltine Judson circa 1913

She wrote a catechism in Burmese, and translated the books of Daniel and Jonah into Burmese. She was the first Protestant to translate any of the scriptures into Thai when in 1819 she translated the Gospel of Matthew.

Her letters home were published in periodicals such as The American Baptist Magazine and republished after her death as devotional writings, making both her and Adoniram celebrities in America.

Her work and writings made "the role of missionary wife as a 'calling'" legitimate for nineteenth-century Americans. There have been at least sixteen biographies of Judson published, the most famous having a new edition printed almost every year from 1830 to 1856, and was described by Unitarian Lydia Maria Child as "a book so universally known that it scarcely need be mentioned."

== Publications ==
- Knowles, Life (Boston, 1829) New International Encyclopedia
- Knowles, James D. Memoir of Mrs. Ann H. Judson, Late Missionary to Burmah (Boston: Lincoln & Edmonds, 1831) fourth edition

== Namesake colleges ==
- Judson College (Alabama)
