= Emily Chubbuck =

American poet

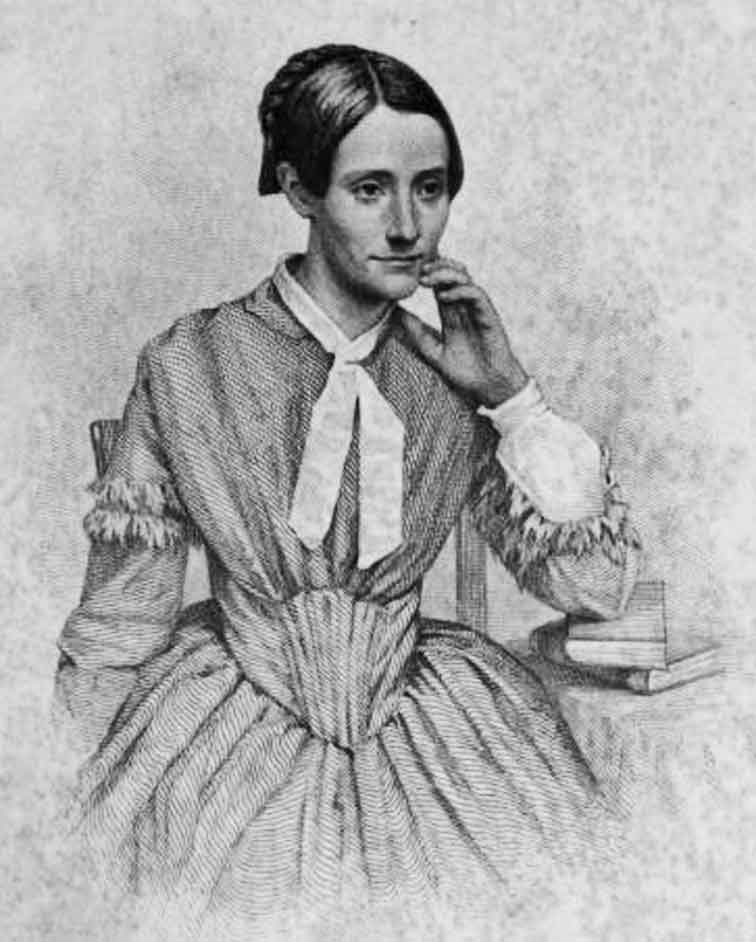
- Emily C. Judson a.k.a. Fanny Forester
- Born: August 23, 1817; Eaton, New York
- Died: June 1, 1854 (aged 36); Hamilton, New York

Emily Chubbuck (later, Emily Judson; pseudonym, Fanny Forester; August 23, 1817 – June 1, 1854) was an American writer.

== Biography ==
Emily Chubbuck was born to poor parents in Eaton, New York on August 23, 1817. In 1834 she became a teacher and joined a Baptist church. In 1840 she entered the Utica female seminary and wrote her first book, Charles Linn, in 1841. She developed a literary friendship with Nathaniel Parker Willis, who she described as the foster-father of her intellect. Willis and Chubbuck first corresponded in June 1844 after her failed attempt at writing children's stories. She was published in Willis's New York Mirror, opening the door for contributions to other journals including The Columbian and Graham's Magazine.

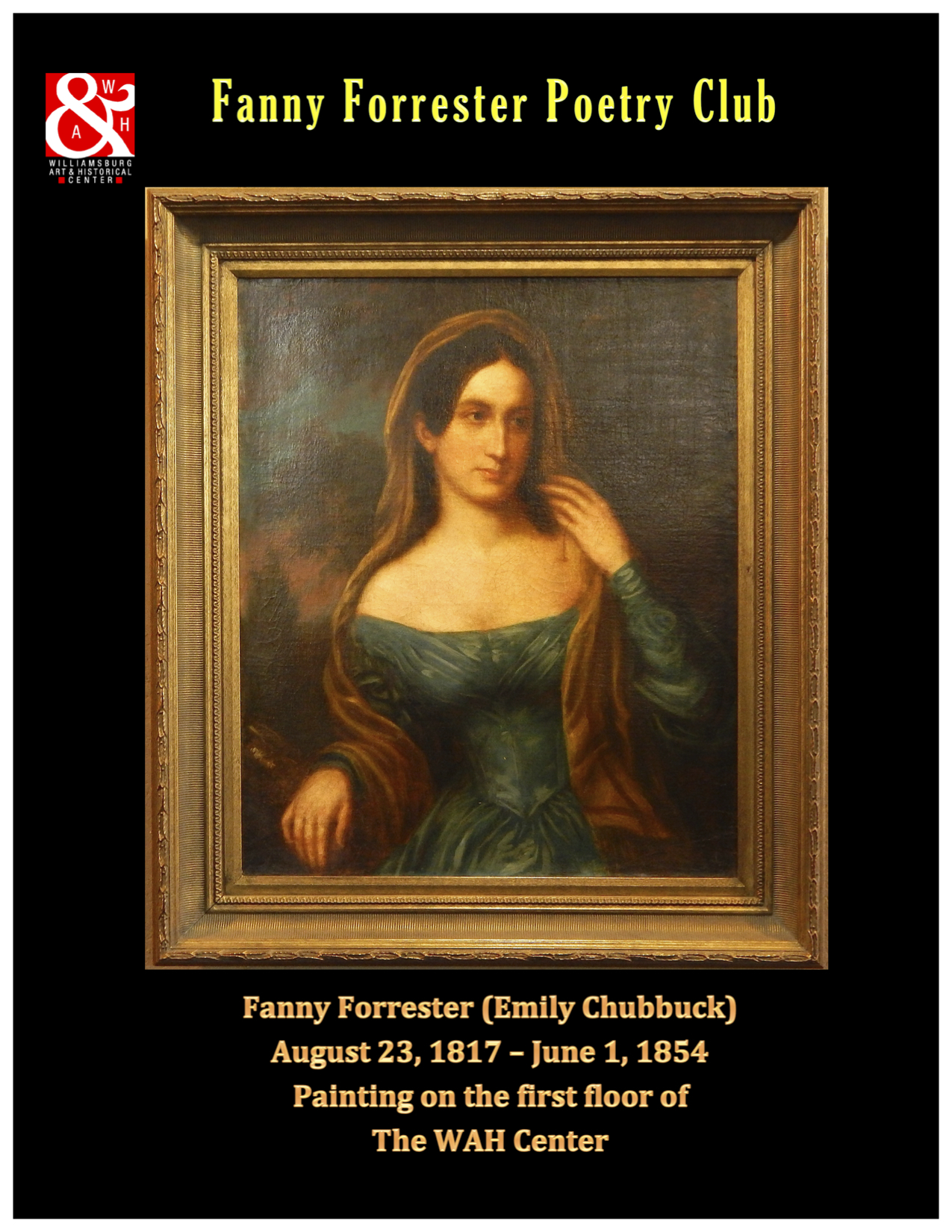
19th c. Portrait of Emily Chubbick, Fanny Forester. Painting in the Collection of the Yuko Nii Foundation of which I am president. On display at the Williamsburg Art & historical Center of which I am president. My own photo.

In 1845, Chubbuck met the author Horace Binney Wallace, whom she described as "a man of talent, a scholar, and a perfect gentleman". The two may have considered a romantic relationship before Wallace became aloof.

She met Adoniram Judson in December 1845 on his return to the United States, when he asked her to write the biography of his second wife, Sarah Hall Boardman. Emily and Judson married on June 2, 1846.

On July 11, 1846, the newlyweds sailed from Boston to Burma where Judson had been a missionary for many years. Chubbuck at first disliked the lifestyle, where she became stepmother to her husband's two young sons and complained privately of "this taking care of teething babies" as being outside her usual literary role. While away from her reading audience, stories spread that she was unsuited for the missionary life and, gradually, her work fell out of favor.

The Judsons had a daughter named Emily Frances who was born in 1847. A son named Charles was born and died on the same day in 1850, three weeks after Judson's death at sea. After learning of his death, Chubbuck returned in poor health to the United States in 1851. She collected materials for Judson's biography that was written by Francis Wayland, then resumed writing herself.

Chubbuck had three names she used to sign her published works, which correspond somewhat with the type of writing she did in those periods. "Emily Chubbuck" was used in her early career mostly writing children's books, "Fanny Forester" in her period contributing to popular magazines, and "Emily Judson" during her missionary period and her later years.

Chubbuck died of consumption in Hamilton, New York on June 1, 1854.

== Critical response ==
Her friend Nathaniel Parker Willis called her a "woman of genius" in an article printed in the July 25, 1846, issue of the Home Journal. Godey's Lady's Book called her "unrivaled among living writers" for her "vivacity, feeling and naiveté". A reviewer of her book Alderbook for Graham's Magazine praised her writing for "ease, grace, invention, vivacity, a quick eye for character and manners, and a fine flexible style". Anthologist Rufus Wilmot Griswold determined she was "one of the most ingenious and brilliant female writers of the country".

== Works ==
- Charles Lynne, or How to Observe the Golden Rule (1841)
- The Great Secret (1842)
- Allan Lucas (1843)
- Alderbrook (1846)
- Trippings in Author Land (1846)
- Memoir of Mrs. Sarah B. Judson (1850)
- An Olio of Domestic Verses (1852)
- Kathayan Slave (1853)
- My Two Sisters (1854)
