= Sarah Hall Boardman =

American missionary (1803–1845)

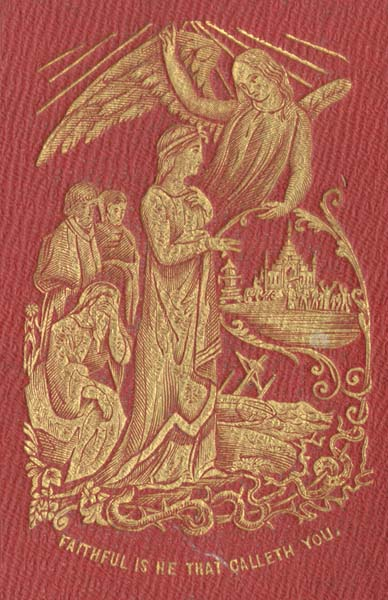
- Born: November 4, 1803; Alstead
- Died: September 1, 1845 (aged 41); Saint Helena
- Spouse(s): Adoniram Judson (m. 1834–1845)
- Children: 7

Sarah Hall Judson (née Boardman; November 4, 1803 – September 1, 1845) was an American missionary and writer.

== Biography ==
Sarah Hall was born in Alstead, New Hampshire. She spent twenty years of her life in Burma (now known as Myanmar) doing missionary work. She and her husband George Boardman sailed to Burma in 1824, just one week after their wedding. They had a son also named George Dana Boardman, often referred to as "George Boardman the Younger". She was widowed in 1830.

Although during this era a widowed missionary wife would be expected to return to her homeland, Boardman continued to proselytize Karen in the jungles and supervised mission schools. In April 4,1834, she married Adoniram Judson. In 1844, she gave birth to Edward Judson, who later pastored a church in New York City named after his father.

Her illness forced the family to return to the United States in 1844, but she died en route at Saint Helena. While in the U.S., Judson asked Emily Chubbuck to write Boardman's biography, and he subsequently married Chubbuck.

Boardman's Burmese translation of The Pilgrim's Progress is still in use at the start of the 21st century; she also translated the New Testament into Peguan.

== Family ==
Sarah had one son, George, with her first husband. She had several children with her second husband: Abby Ann (1835), Adoniram Brown (1837), Elnathan (1838), Henry (1838), Luther (1841), Henry Hall (1842), Charles (1843), Edward (1844).
