= Adoniram Judson =

American missionary (1788–1850)

Adoniram
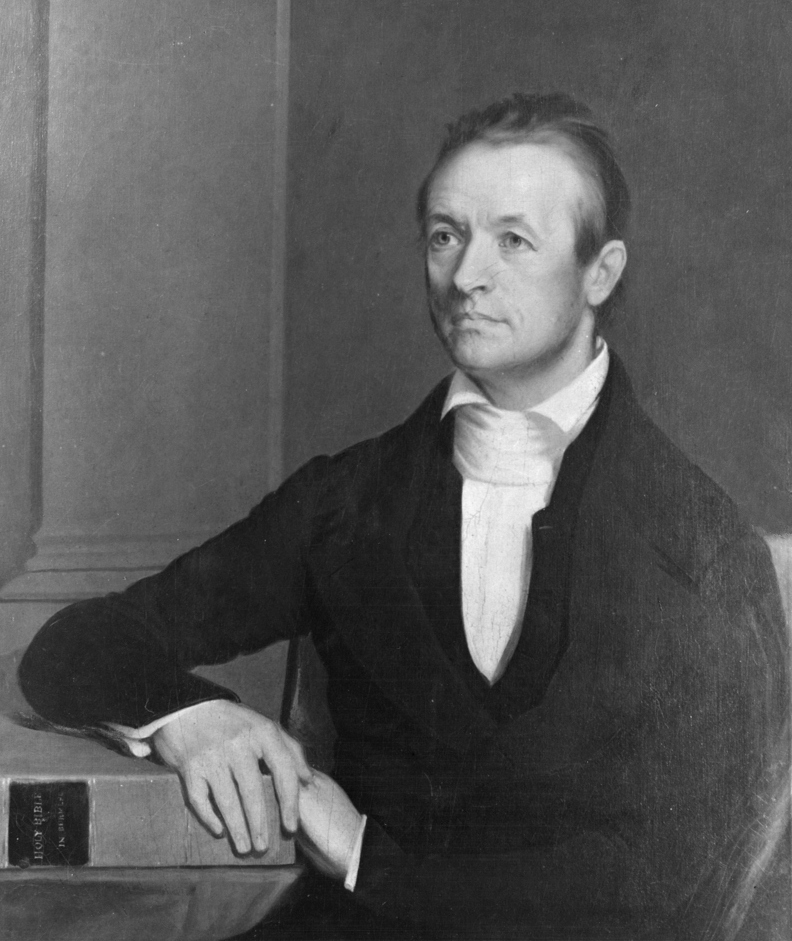
- Adoniram Judson by George Peter Alexander Healy, 1846
- Born: August 9, 1788; Malden, Massachusetts, U.S.
- Died: April 12, 1850 (aged 61); At sea in the Bay of Bengal
- Education: Brown University and Andover Theological Seminary
- Occupation: Missionary to Burma
- Spouse(s): Ann Hasseltine, 1812–26 (her death); Sarah Hall Boardman, 1834–45 (her death); Emily Chubbuck, 1846–50 (his death)
- Children: (1) Stillborn son, 1813 to Ann Judson; (2) Roger Williams Judson, 11/11/1814 to Ann Judson (lived only 2 wks); (3) Maria Elizabeth Butterworth Judson, 1/26/1825 - 4/26/1827 to Ann Judson; (4) Abigail Ann Judson, 10/31/1835 to Sarah Judson; (5) Adoniram Judson Jr., 4/7/1837 to Sarah Judson; (6) Elnathan Judson, 7/15/1838 to Sarah Judson; (7) Henry Judson, 12/31/1839 - 7/31/1841 to Sarah Judson; (8) Stillborn son named Luther in 1840 to Sarah Judson; (9) Henry Judson, July 1842 (named in honor of baby Henry who had passed the previous year) to Sarah Judson; (10) Charles Judson, 12/18/1843 - 8/1845 to Sarah Judson; (11) Edward Judson 12/27/1844 to Sarah Judson; (12) Emily Frances Judson, 12/26/1847 to Emily Judson; (13) Charles Judson, 4/13/1850 (passed the same day) to Emily Judson.

Adoniram Judson (/ˌædəˈnaɪrəm/; August 9, 1788 – April 12, 1850) was an American Particular Baptist missionary who worked in Burma for almost 40 years. At the age of 25, Judson was sent from North America to preach in Burma. His mission and work with Luther Rice led to the establishment of the Triennial Convention, the first national Baptist ecclesiastical organization (mainly for missionary work), now called American Baptist Churches USA.

Judson was one of the first Protestant missionaries to Burma. He translated the Bible into Burmese and established a number of Baptist churches in Burma.

== Early life ==
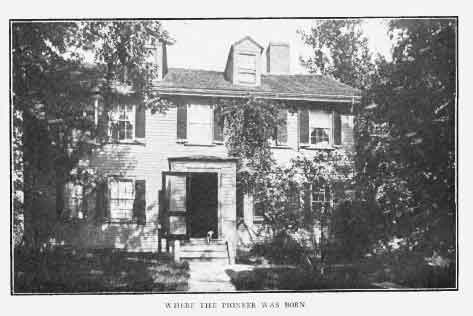
House where Judson was born

Judson was born on August 9, 1788, in Malden, Middlesex County, Massachusetts. He was born to Abigail (née Brown) and Adoniram Judson Sr., a Congregational minister. Judson entered the College of Rhode Island & Providence Plantations (now Brown University) at 16, and graduated as valedictorian of his class at 19. While studying at college, he met a young man named Jacob Eames, a devout deist and skeptic. Judson and Eames developed a strong friendship, leading to Judson's abandonment of his childhood faith and parents' religious instruction. During this time, Judson embraced the writings of the French philosophes. After graduating from college, Judson opened a school and wrote an English grammar and mathematics textbook for girls.

Judson's deist views were shaken when his friend Eames fell violently ill and died. Both had been sleeping in separate rooms at an inn, and Judson heard the death throes of the person next door, only to learn from the clerk the next morning that his anonymous neighbor had been Mr. Eames, who had indeed died. The shock of learning the dying neighbor's identity – and that Eames had led Judson away from the Christian faith into skepticism, but was now dead – returned Judson back to the faith of his youth, although he was already attending the Andover Theological Seminary. In 1808, Judson "made a solemn dedication of himself to God". During his final year at the school, Judson decided upon a missionary career.

In 1810, Judson joined a group of mission-minded students who called themselves "The Brethren"; the students inspired the establishment of America's first organized missionary society. Eager to serve abroad, Judson became convinced that "Asia with its idolatrous myriads, was the most important field in the world for missionary effort". He, and three other students from the seminary, appeared before the Congregationalists' General Association to appeal for support. In 1810, the elders voted to form the American Board of Commissioners for Foreign Missions.

=== Marriage ===
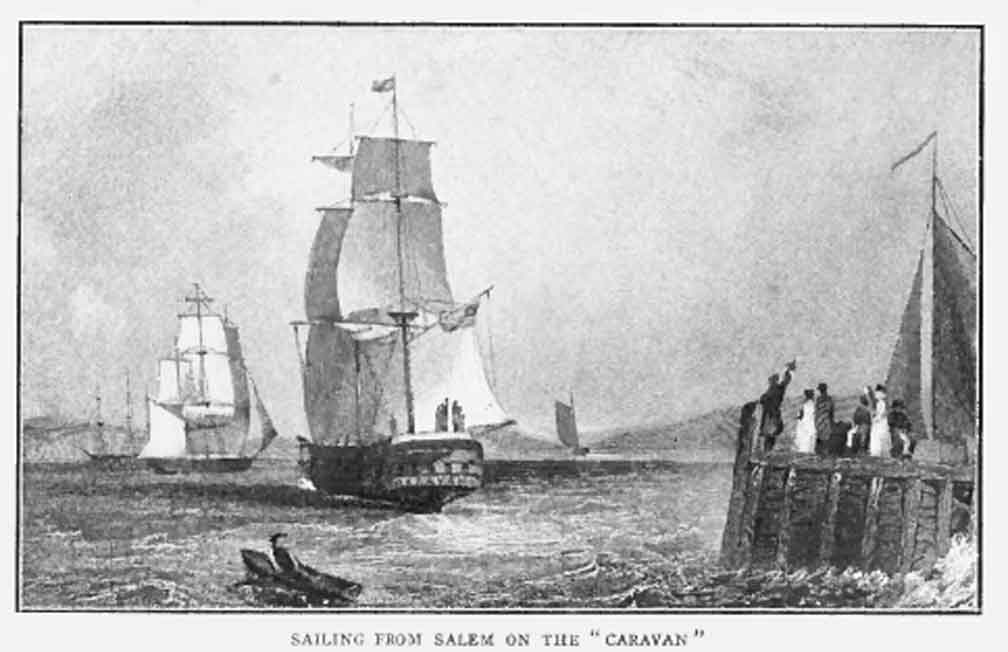
Sailing from Salem on the "Caravan"

On September 19, Judson was appointed by the American Board of Commissioners for Foreign Missions as a missionary to the East. Judson was also commissioned by the Congregational Church, and married Ann Hasseltine on February 5, 1812. He was ordained the next day at the Tabernacle Church in Salem. On February 19, he set sail aboard the brig Caravan with Luther Rice; Samuel Newell and Harriet Newell; and his wife, Ann (known as "Nancy") Judson.

== Ministry background ==
=== Voyage to India ===
The Judsons arrived in Calcutta on June 17, 1812. While aboard ship en route to India, he did a focused study on the theology of baptism. He came to the position that believer's baptism was theologically valid and should be done as a matter of obedience to the command of Jesus (Matthew 28:19–20).

On September 6, 1812, he switched to the Baptist denomination along with his wife and they were baptized by immersion in Calcutta by an English missionary associate of William Carey named William Ward.

Both the local and British authorities did not want Americans evangelizing Hindus in the area, so the group of missionaries separated and sought other mission fields. They were ordered out of India by the British East India Company, to whom American missionaries were even less welcome than British (they were baptized in September, and already in June, the United States had declared war on Great Britain). The following year, on July 13, 1813, he moved to Burma, and en route his wife miscarried their first child aboard ship.

Judson offered to Baptists in the United States to serve as their missionary. Luther Rice, who had also converted, was in poor health and returned to America where his work and William Carey's urging resulted in the 1814 formation of the first national Baptist denomination in the United States for Foreign Missions (commonly called the Triennial Convention) and its offshoot the American Baptist Missionary Union.

=== Missionaries in Burma ===
It was another difficult year before the Judsons finally reached their intended destination, Burma. Buddhist Burma, Judson was told by the Serampore Baptists, was impermeable to Christian evangelism. Judson, who already knew Latin, Greek, and Hebrew, immediately began studying Burmese grammar but took over three years to learn to speak it. This was due, in part, to the radical difference in structure between Burmese and Western languages. He found a tutor and spent twelve hours per day studying the language. He and his wife firmly dedicated themselves to understanding it.

During this time they were almost entirely isolated from contact with any European or American. Four years passed before Judson dared even to hold a semi-public service. At first, he tried adapting to Burmese customs by wearing a yellow robe to mark himself as a teacher of religion, but he soon changed to white to show he was not a Buddhist. Then, he gave up the whole attempt as artificial and decided that, regardless of his dress, no Burmese would identify him as anything but a foreigner.

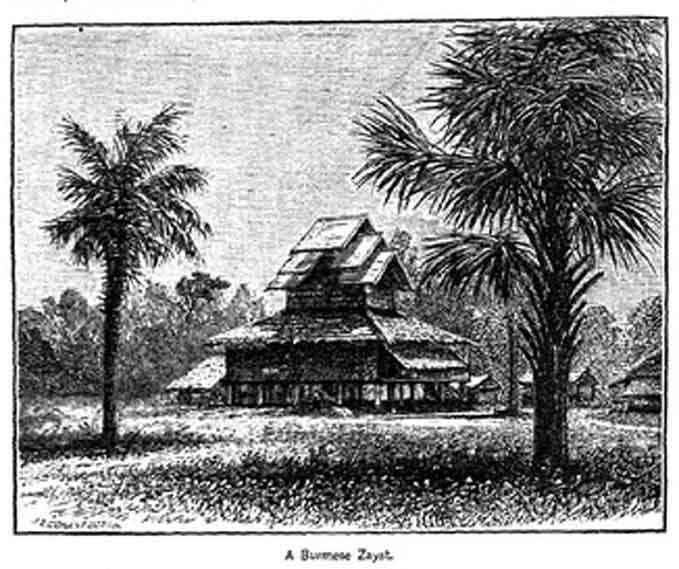
A Burmese Zayat

He accommodated some Burmese customs and built a zayat, the customary bamboo and thatch reception shelter, on the street near his home as a reception room and meeting place for Burmese men. Fifteen men came to his first public meeting in April 1819. He was encouraged but suspected they had come more out of curiosity than anything else. Their attention wandered, and they soon seemed uninterested. Two months later, he baptized his first Burmese convert, Maung Naw, a 35-year-old timber worker from the hill tribes. "Burma Baptist Chronicle" stated that Maung Naw (Nai Naw) was an ethnic Mon.

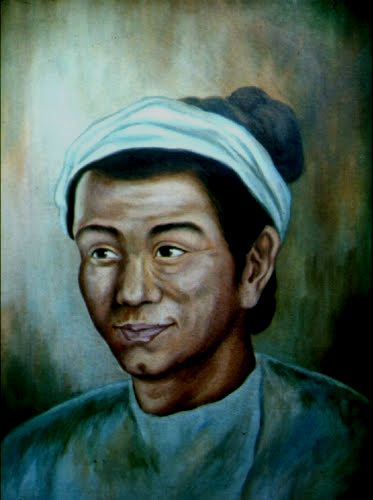
Nai Naw, the first convert to Christianity

First attempts by the Judsons to interest the natives of Rangoon with the Gospel of Jesus met with almost total indifference. Buddhist traditions and the Burmese worldview at that time led many to disregard the pleadings of Adoniram and his wife to believe in one living and all-powerful God. Their second child, Roger William Judson, died at almost eight months of age.

Judson completed the translation of the Grammatical Notices of the Burman Language the following July and the Gospel of Matthew, in 1817. Judson began public evangelism in 1818 sitting in a zayat by the roadside calling out "Ho! Every one that thirsteth for knowledge!" The first believer was baptized in 1819, and there were 18 believers by 1822.

In 1820, Judson and a fellow missionary named Colman petitioned the Emperor of Burma, King Bagyidaw, in the hope that he would grant freedom for the missionaries to preach and teach throughout the country, as well as remove the sentence of death that was given for those Burmese who changed religion.

Moung Shway Moung, an early convert to Christianity

Bagyidaw disregarded their appeal and threw one of their Gospel tracts to the ground after reading a few lines. The missionaries returned to Rangoon and met with the fledgling church there to consider what to do next. The progress of Christianity would continue to be slow with much risk of endangerment and death in the Burmese Empire.

It took Judson 12 years to make 18 converts. His wife, Ann, was even more fluent in the spoken language of the people than her more academically literate husband. She befriended the wife of the viceroy of Rangoon, as quickly as she did illiterate workers and women.

A printing press had been sent from Serampore, and a missionary printer, George H. Hough, who arrived from America with his wife in 1817, produced the first printed materials in Burmese ever printed in Burma, which included 800 copies of Judson's translation of the Gospel of Matthew. The chronicler of the church, Maung Shwe Wa, concludes this part of the story, "So was born the church in Rangoon–logger and fisherman, the poor and the rich, men and women. One traveled the whole path to Christ in three days; another took two years. But once they had decided for Christ they were his for all time."

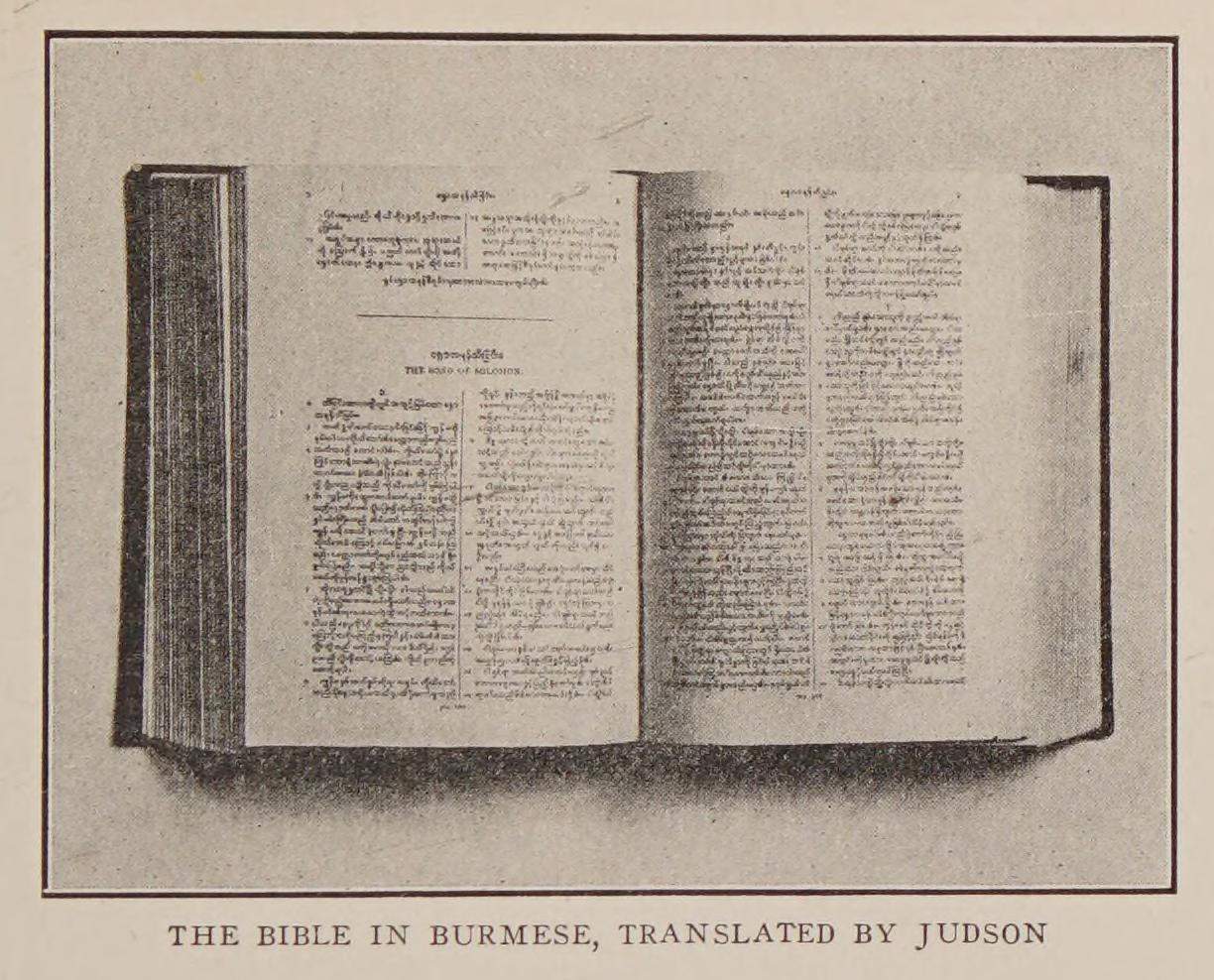
The Bible in Burmese translated by Judson

One of the early disciples was U Shwe Ngong, a teacher and leader of a group of intellectuals dissatisfied with Buddhism, who were attracted to the new faith. He was a Deist skeptic to whose mind the preaching of Judson, once a college skeptic himself, was singularly challenging. After consideration, he assured Judson that he was ready to believe in God, Jesus Christ, and the atonement.

Judson, instead of welcoming him to the faith, pressed him further asking if he believed what he had read in the gospel of Matthew that Jesus the son of God died on the cross. U Shwe Ngong shook his head and said, "Ah, you have caught me now. I believe that he suffered death, but I cannot believe he suffered the shameful death on the cross." Not long after, he came back to tell Judson, "I have been trusting in my own reason, not the word of God…. I now believe the crucifixion of Christ because it is contained in scripture."

The essence of Judson's preaching was a combination of conviction of the truth with the rationality of the Christian faith, a firm belief in the authority of the Bible, and a determination to make Christianity relevant to the Burmese mind without violating the integrity of Christian truth, or as he put it, "to preach the gospel, not anti-Buddhism."

By 1823, ten years after his arrival, membership of the little church had grown to 18, and Judson finished the first draft of his translation of the New Testament in Burmese.

=== Anglo-Burmese War (1824–1826) ===
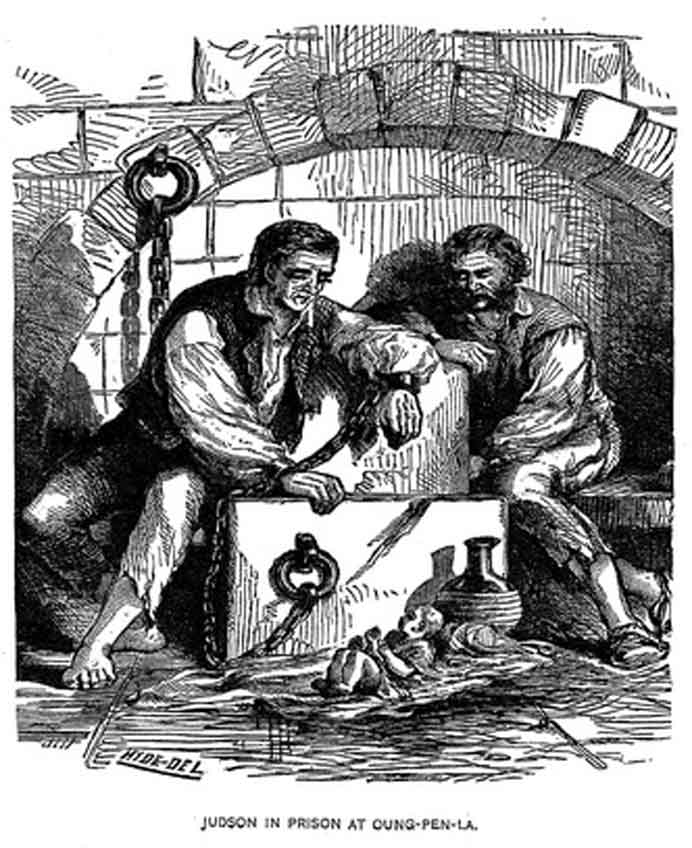
Judson imprisoned at Ava

Two opposite hungers triggered the First Anglo-Burmese War of 1824: Burma's desire for more territory, and Britain's desire for more trade. Burma threatened Assam and Bengal; Britain responded by attacking and absorbing two Burmese provinces into her India holdings to broaden her trade routes to East Asia. The war was a rough interruption of the Baptists' missionary work. English-speaking Americans were too easily confused with the enemy and suspected of spying.

Judson was imprisoned for 17 months during the war between the United Kingdom and Burma, first at Ava and then at Aung Pinle. Judson and Price were violently arrested. Officers led by an official executioner burst into the Judson home, threw Judson to the ground in front of his wife, bound him with torture thongs, and dragged him off to the prison of Ava.

Twelve months later, Judson and Price, along with a small group of surviving Western prisoners, were marched overland for six more months of misery in a primitive village near Mandalay. Of the sepoy British prisoners-of-war imprisoned with them, all but one died. He spent 20 months in prison.

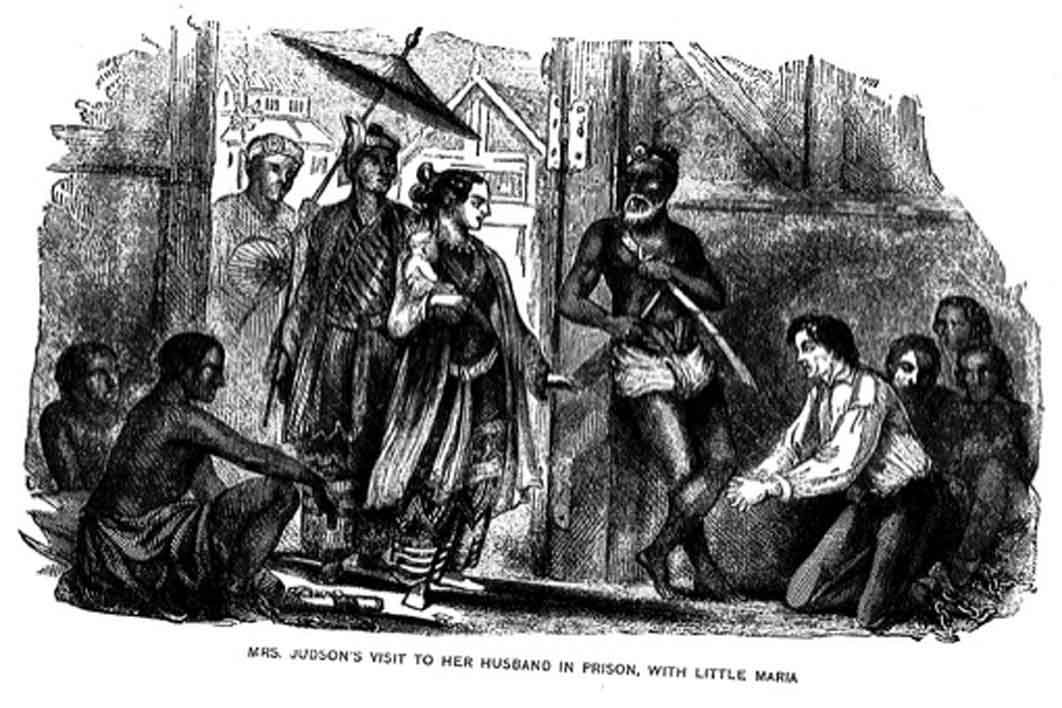
Ann visits Adoniram in prison

After her husband was released by the Burmese, Ann wrote that one good result of the war could be that terms of the treaty which ceded Burmese provinces to the British might provide opportunity to expand the witness of the mission into unreached parts of the country.

On October 24, 1826, Ann died at Amherst (now Kyaikkami), Burma. Their third child died six months later. She died while her husband was out exploring the ceded province of Tenasserim. Within a few years of the end of the war, Baptist membership doubled on an average of every eight years for the 32 years between 1834 and 1866.

Ko-Thah-a

The collapse of Burma's armies brought Judson out of prison, but his release was not complete freedom. In 1826, several months after the surrender, Burma pressed Judson into service as a translator for the peace negotiations.

Most of the growth of Baptist churches in Burma was in British-ruled territory, rather than the Burmese-ruled kingdom. Most of the growth came from animist tribes, rather than from the major population group, the Buddhist Burmese. The first Burmese pastor Judson ordained was Ko-Thah-a, one of the original group of converts, who refounded the church at Rangoon.

=== Karen apostle ===
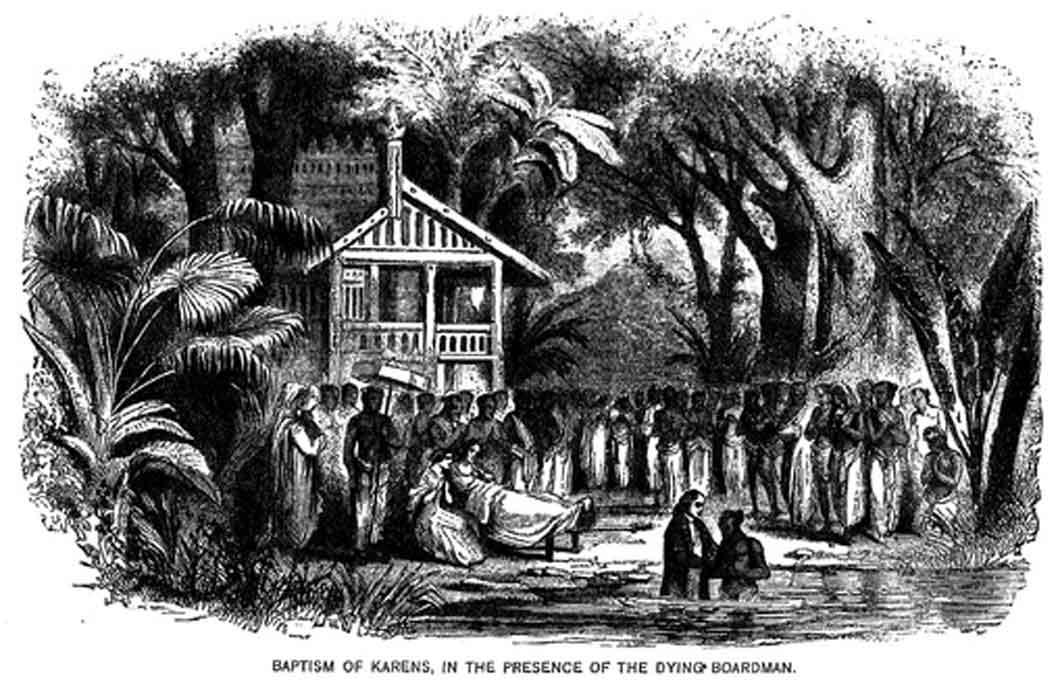
Baptism of Karen people in the presence of the dying George Boardman

The Karen people were a hunted minority group of ancient Tibeto-Burman ancestry scattered in the forests and jungles of the Salween River and in the hills along the southeast coast. Judson was the first missionary to make contact with them in 1827, when he ransomed and freed a debt-slave from one of his early converts. The freed slave, Ko Tha Byu, was an illiterate, surly man who spoke almost no Burmese and was reputed to be not only a thief, but also a murderer who admitted killing at least 30 men, but could not remember exactly how many more.

In 1828, the former Karen bandit, "whose rough, undisciplined genius, energy and zeal for Christ" (Sarah B Judson) had caught the notice of the missionaries, was sent south with a new missionary couple, the Boardmans, into the territory of the strongly animistic, non-Buddhist Karen. Ko Tha Byu was no sooner baptized, when he set off into the jungle alone to preach to his fellow tribe members. Astonishingly, he found them prepared for his preaching. Their ancient oracle traditions, handed down for centuries, contained some startling echoes of the Old Testament that some scholars conjecture a linkage with Jewish communities (or possibly even Nestorians), before their migrations from western China into Burma perhaps as early as the 12th century.

The core of what they called their "Tradition of the Elders" was a belief in an unchangeable, eternal, all-powerful God, creator of heaven and earth, of man, and of woman formed from a rib taken from the man (Genesis). They believed in humanity's temptation by a devil, and its fall, and that some day a Great Messiah would come to its rescue. They lived in expectation of a prophecy that white foreigners would bring them a sacred parchment roll.

While the Boardmans and Ko Tha Byu were penetrating the jungles to the south, Judson shook off a paralyzing year-long siege of depression that overcame him after the death of his wife and set out alone on long canoe trips up the Salween River into the tiger-infested jungles to evangelize the northern Karen. Between trips, he worked unceasingly at his lifelong goal of translating the entire Bible into Burmese. When he finished it at last in 1834, he had been labouring on it for 24 years. It was printed and published in 1835.

In April of that same year, he married Sarah Hall Boardman, widow of fellow missionary George Boardman. They had eight children, five of whom survived to adulthood. Sarah's health began failing and physicians recommended a return to America. Sarah died en route at St. Helena on September 1, 1845. He continued home, where he was greeted as a celebrity and toured the eastern seaboard raising the profile of and money for missionary activity. Because he could barely speak above a whisper, due to pulmonary illness, his public addresses were made by speaking to an assistant, who would then address the audience.

On June 2, 1846, Judson married for the third time, to writer Emily Chubbuck, who he had commissioned to write memoirs for Sarah Hall Boardman. They had a daughter born in 1847.

Sarah Cummings and Jason Tuma arrived in 1832. Cummings proved her mettle at once, choosing to work alone with Karen evangelists in the malaria-ridden Salween River valley north of Moulmein, but within two years she died of fever.

In 1835, a second single woman, Eleanor Macomber, after five years of mission to the Ojibway Indians in Michigan, joined the mission in Burma. Alone, with the help of Karen evangelistic assistants, she planted a church in a remote Karen village and nurtured it to the point where it could be placed under the care of an ordinary missionary. She lived there five years and died of jungle fever.

Judson developed a serious lung disease and doctors prescribed a sea voyage as a cure. On April 12, 1850, he died at age 61 on board ship in the Bay of Bengal and was buried at sea, having spent 37 years abroad with only one trip back home to America. A memorial to Judson was built on Burial Hill in Plymouth, Massachusetts.

== Legacy ==
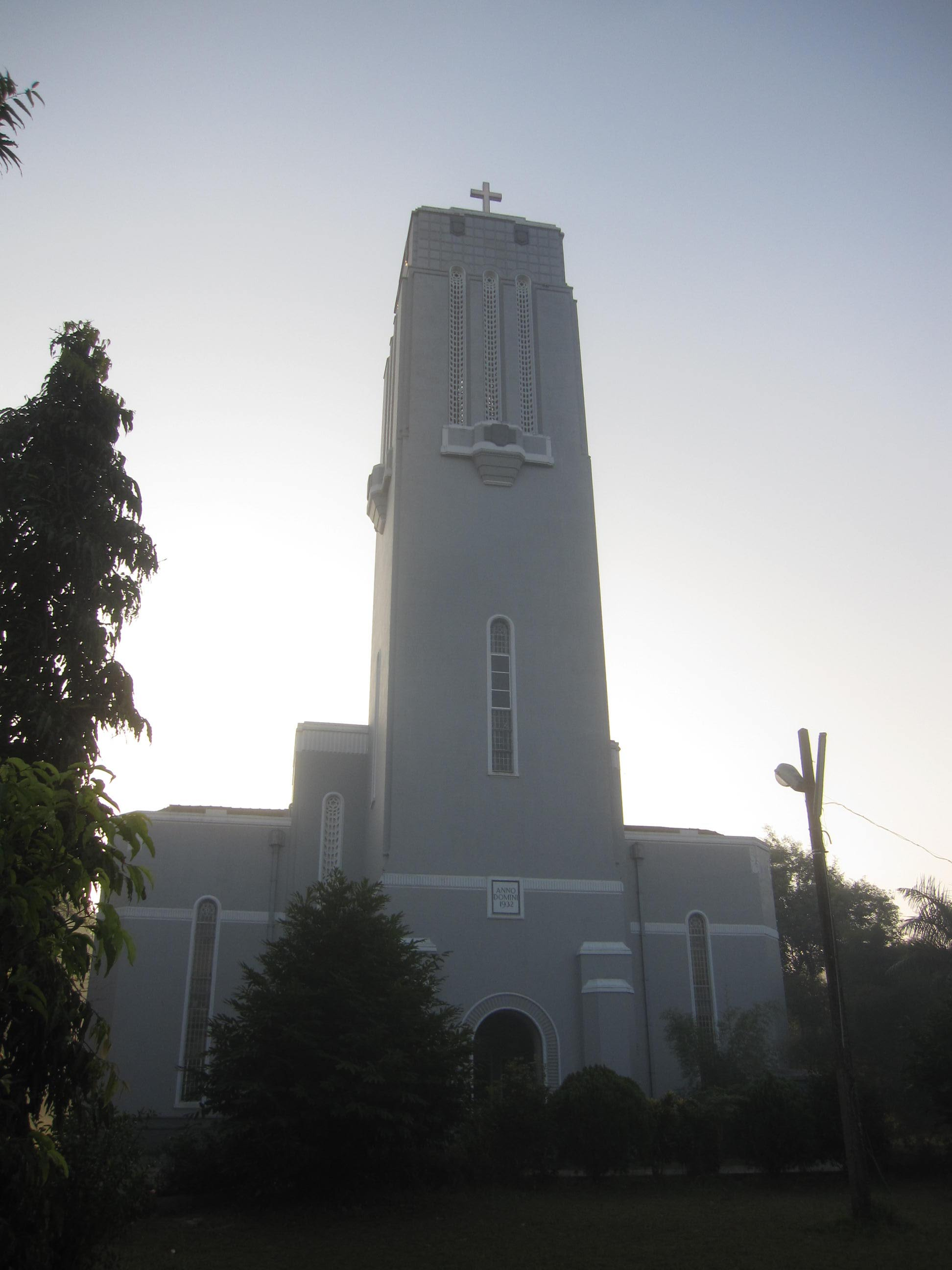
Judson Church, Yangon University

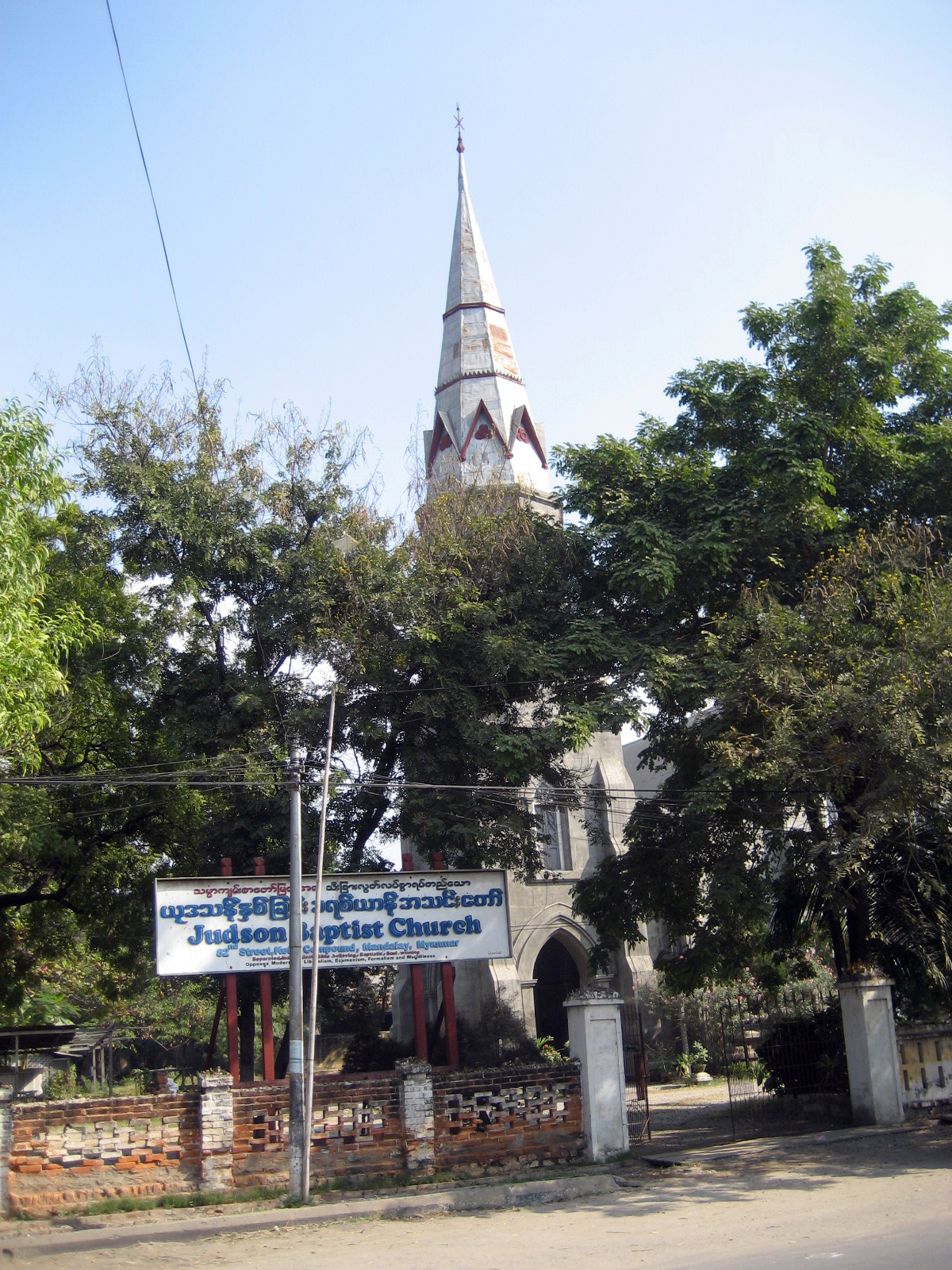
Judson Memorial Baptist Church, in Mandalay, Myanmar.

By the time of Judson's death, he had translated the Bible into Burmese as well as a half-completed Burmese-English dictionary. Burma at the time had 100 churches, and over 8,000 believers.

By 2006, Myanmar had the third largest number of Baptists worldwide, behind the United States and India. The majority of adherents are Karen, Kachin and Chin.

Judson compiled the first ever Burmese-English dictionary; missionary E. A. Steven completed the English-Burmese half. Every dictionary and grammar written in Burma in the last two centuries has been based on ones originally created by Judson. Judson "became a symbol of the preeminence of Bible translation for" Protestant missionaries. In the 1950s, Burma's Buddhist prime minister U Nu told the Burma Christian Council "Oh no, a new translation is not necessary. Judson's captures the language and idiom of Burmese perfectly and is very clear and understandable." Though the Bible has been translated numerous times into Burmese, Judson's translation remains the most popular version in Myanmar.

Each July, Baptist churches in Myanmar celebrate "Judson Day," commemorating his arrival as a missionary. Inside the campus of Yangon University is Judson Church, named in his honor, and in 1920 Judson College, named in his honor, merged into Rangoon College, which has since been renamed Yangon University. The American University named in his honor, Judson University was founded in Elgin, Illinois, in 1963, as the liberal arts Judson College was separated from the Northern Baptist Theological Seminary, which moved from Chicago to Lombard, Illinois. This American Judson College became Judson University in 2007 and now also has a campus in Rockford, Illinois.

Judson's change to the validity of believer's baptism, and subsequent need of support, led to the founding of the first national Baptist organization in the United States and subsequently to all American Baptist associations, including the Southern Baptists that were the first to break off from the national organization. Publication of his wife Ann's letters about their mission inspired many Americans to become or support Christian missionaries. At least 36 Baptist churches in the United States are named after Judson. In 2024 Southeastern Baptist Theological Seminary renamed its undergraduate program to Judson College.

The town of Judsonia, Arkansas is named after Judson along with Judson College in Alabama which was named after his wife Ann and a dormitory at Maranatha Baptist University carries his name. Christian Union owns and operates a ministry center named after him at his undergraduate alma mater, Brown University. His seminary alma mater, Andover Theological Seminary, (now Andover Newton Theological School), gives out an annual The Judson Award.

Judson Harmon, a former Governor of Ohio, was named after him.

Judson Cominskie, first son of renowned Free Will Baptist Minister, Devin Lyle Cominskie, derives his name from Adoniram.

In World War II, the United States liberty ship SS Adoniram Judson was named in his honor.

== Published works ==
- Burmese Bible, as well as portions published before the entire text was translated
- A Burmese-English dictionary (English-Burmese portion completed posthumously, see below)
- A Burmese Grammar
- Two hymns: Our Father, God, Who art in Heaven and Come Holy Spirit, Dove Divine

== See also ==
- John Alexander Stewart (scholar), another first compiler (with C. W. Dunn) of a Burmese-English dictionary
