= Judson Memorial Church =

Church in Manhattan, New York

- Judson Memorial Church, Campanile and Judson Hall
- U.S. National Register of Historic Places
- U.S. Historic district – Contributing property
- New York State Register of Historic Places
- New York City Landmark
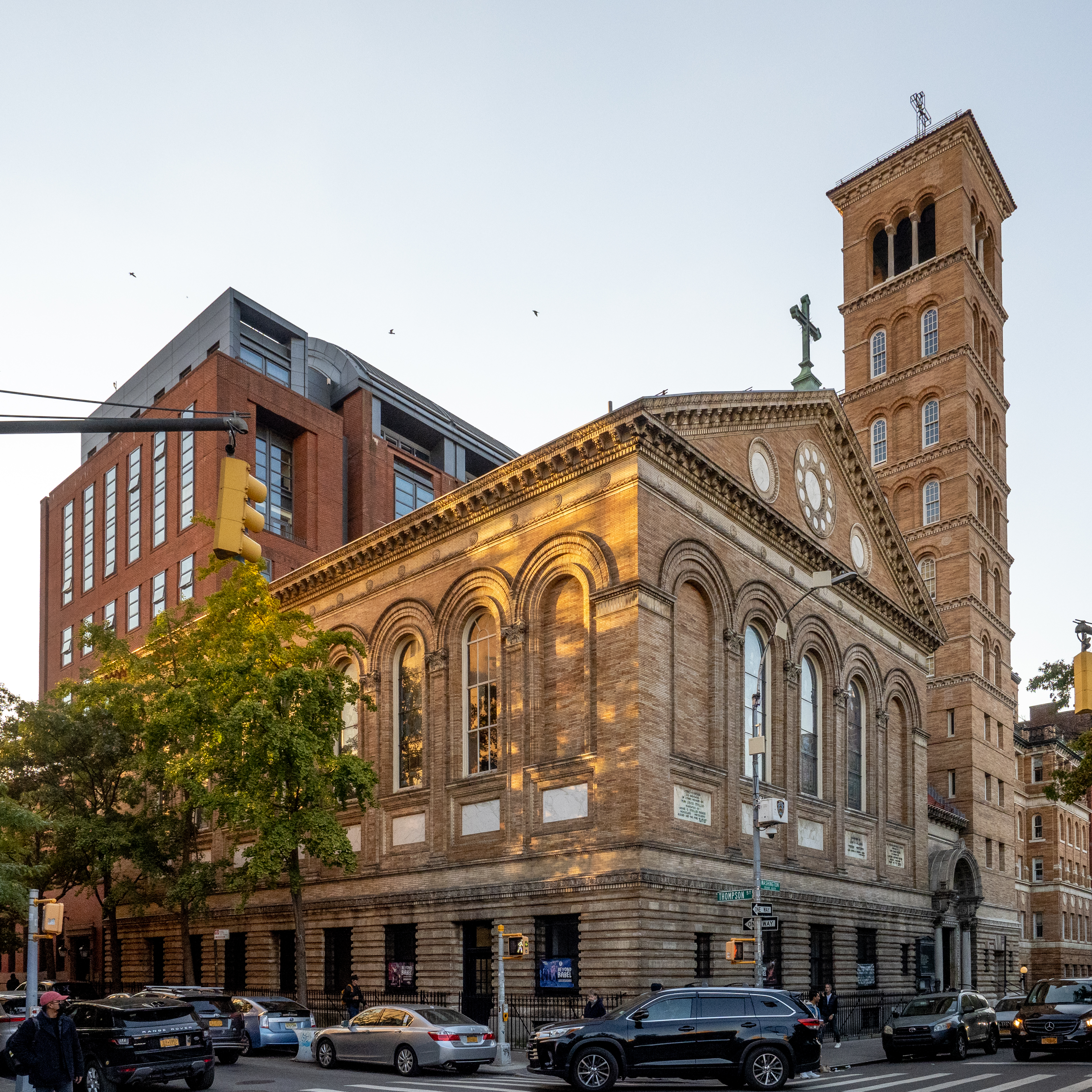

- Location within Lower Manhattan Location within New York Location within the United States
- Location: 55 Washington Square South at Thompson Street, Manhattan, New York, United States
- Coordinates: 40°43′49″N 73°59′54″W
- Built: Sanctuary: 1888–93; Campanile: 1895–96; Hall: 1877
- Architect: Sanctuary: Stanford White; Campanile: McKim, Mead & White; Hall: John G. Prague
- Architectural style: Italian Renaissance
- Website: judson.org
- Part of: South Village Historic District (ID14000026)
- NRHP reference No.: 74001274
- NYSRHP No.: 06101.000056
- NYCL No.: 0196, 0230

Significant dates
- Added to NRHP: October 16, 1974
- Designated NYSRHP: June 23, 1980
- Designated NYCL: May 17, 1966

The Judson Memorial Church is located on Washington Square South between Thompson Street and Sullivan Street, near Gould Plaza, opposite Washington Square Park, in the Greenwich Village neighborhood of the New York City borough of Manhattan. It is affiliated with the American Baptist Churches USA, the Alliance of Baptists, the Association of Welcoming and Affirming Baptists and with the United Church of Christ.

The church sanctuary, its campanile tower and the attached Judson Hall were designated landmarks by the New York City Landmarks Preservation Commission in 1966, and were added to the National Register of Historic Places in 1974.

== History ==
=== Founding ===
By the mid-19th century, the village had the largest African-American community in the city, along with joined German, French and Irish immigrants, and to the immediate south a majority of Italian immigrants. Earlier more affluent communities had begun an exodus from the adjacent neighborhoods to the south and east. Judson observed that the "tendency is for the intelligent, well-to-do and church-going people to withdraw from this part of the city". The park and the new church stood at the intersection between the affluence of Fifth Avenue and the poverty of Lower Manhattan.

The church was founded by Edward Judson who had been preaching at the Berean Baptist Church on Downing Street, also in the village, but his efforts at expanding the congregation were so successful that a new sanctuary was required. In 1888, with the backing of John D. Rockefeller and other prominent Baptists, construction of a new church south of the park was begun. Judson had chosen the location because he wanted to reach out to the neighboring communities. It was to be a memorial to Judson's father, Adoniram Judson, one of the first Protestant missionaries to Burma. The church building was designed by architect Stanford White, with stained glass windows by John La Farge. It features Renaissance influences wedded to a basic Italianate form. Sculptor Augustus Saint-Gaudens designed a marble frieze in the baptistery, which was carried out by Herbert Adams; it was completed in 1893.

As well as worship and religious education, the church offered health-care and outreach ministries to non-members as well as members. However, the church was not able to attract sufficient support from its wealthy neighbors on the north side of square, and by 1912, the church found itself in financial difficulties. The Baptist City Society (metropolitan association of Baptist churches) was persuaded to take over the property and financial responsibility, which it ended up holding until the congregation was again able to resume ownership and control in 1973.

=== Early 20th century ===
In 1921, under the leadership of its pastor, A. Ray Petty, the church offered first its basement and then rented its parish house on Thompson Street to Dr. Eleanor A. Campbell, a pioneering female physician who ran the Judson Health Center, a free medical and dental clinic. The center operated at 237 Thompson Street from 1922 to 1950, when the clinic moved to its present location on Spring Street in SoHo, the neighborhood to the south. During the 1920s, the church, with aid from the national American Baptist denomination, also ran the Judson Neighborhood House, a settlement house, at 179 Sullivan Street.

During the Great Depression in the early 20th century, Laurence Hosie served as pastor. Although the congregation dwindled, the church remained active in various social causes, including allowing homeless men to sleep on the pews at times. In 1937, the Baptist City Society appointed Renato Giacomelli Alden as pastor.

After World War II, with the rush of new students the former parish house and health center was turned into a residence for international students and students of various races, led by Dean R. Wright, the Baptist chaplain to New York University, the church's neighbor. At the same time, a new pastor, Robert Spike, began theological explorations with veterans and the artists then working in the village, which brought a new group of congregants and led to a change in the church's worship style to a more modern sensibility.

=== Late 20th century ===
In 1956, Howard Moody became the senior minister, continuing the church's outspoken advocacy on issues of civil rights and free expression, as well as breaking with the confessedly evangelical understandings of the past by speaking out for issues once universally considered to be immoral by Christians (such as abortion and the decriminalization of prostitution), a policy that continues under the present leadership of the congregation. Al Carmines, the associate pastor 1962 to 1979, focused his ministry on the arts (see below). The congregation expanded during this period, allowing the church to take back control of its property from the citywide Baptist organization that had been acting as trustee until 1973. Following Moody's retirement in 1990, Peter Laarman became senior pastor. Coming from a background in union organizing, Laarman led the church into ministries dealing with economic issues, while continuing work with the arts and other social issues, and starting a multi-year program of restoration and renovation of the church's aging buildings.

After becoming senior minister in 2005, senior pastor Donna Schaper created a pioneering program to train future clergy in how to do "public ministry" from a congregational base, by providing part-time apprenticeships to seminarians and recent graduates. Also under her leadership, the church took a leadership role in the New Sanctuary Movement for immigrant rights.

== Building ==
The church building is located at 54–57 Washington Square South. In addition to La Farge's stained-glass windows and Saint-Gaudens's marble frieze, it features Italian Renaissance influences wedded to a basic Italianate form, and has notable examples of scagliola, a very convincing handcrafted imitation of marble made of highly polished pigmented plaster. Overall, the exterior and shape of the building is said to resemble the Basilica di Santa Maria Maggiore in Rome, Italy, while the entrance is said to be inspired by the Renaissance church San Alessandro, built in Lucca, Italy, in 1480. The fourteen stained glass windows in the church's main sanctuary are the largest collection of major LaFarge windows in any one place in the U.S.

The campanile tower, located at 51–54 Washington Square South to the west of the church itself, was built in 1895–96, after the sanctuary had been completed, and was designed by the firm of McKim, Mead & White. The adjacent Hall, however, predates the church, having been built in 1877, and was designed by John G. Prague.

In 1999, facing financial difficulties, the church's board of trustees sold the Judson House, the parish building behind the church, to New York University School of Law, which used the site for its new Furman Hall. At eleven stories tall, the new building now towers over the church and Washington Square Park beyond, causing considerable controversy in the community at the time of its construction. The church's offices and a small assembly hall now occupy a condominium suite in one corner of the new building, adjacent to the main church, at 239 Thompson Street.

From 1990 to 2006, the church building was repainted, reroofed; the stained glass windows were cleaned and reinstalled by Cummings Studio; an elevator was installed to make the building accessible and air conditioning was added. These projects exhausted all the proceeds from the sale of the back lots, plus approximately $1 million additional (equivalent to 1.6 million in 2025), raised from contributions of arts patrons and the congregation.

== Ministers ==
Notable ministers include:

- Edward Judson (minister, 1890–1914)
- Howard Moody (minister, 1956–1992)
- Al Carmines (associate minister, 1961–1981)

== See also ==
- List of New York City Designated Landmarks in Manhattan below 14th Street
- National Register of Historic Places listings in Manhattan below 14th Street
