= History of India–United States relations =

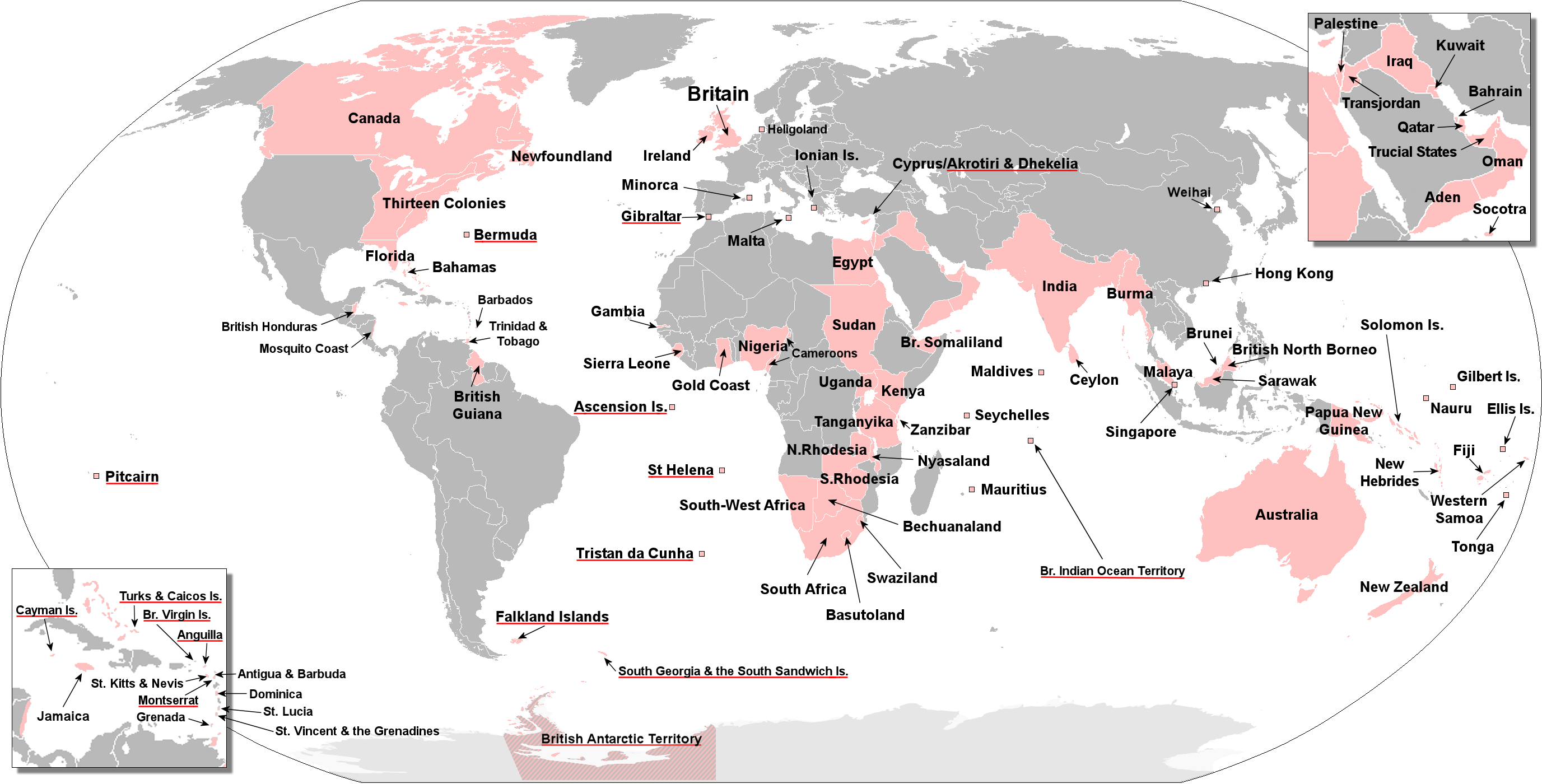
The United States (identified as the Thirteen Colonies above) and India were two of the largest British colonies

The relationship between India and the United States has been shaped over the centuries by their status as former British colonies and their important present-day role in world geopolitics.

== Before 1947 ==
"Indian", which has been used as an alternative for the Indigenous peoples of the Americas, originated with Christopher Columbus, who, in his search for India, thought that he had arrived in the East Indies. This historical misnomer has persisted over the centuries, shaping cultural perceptions and narratives surrounding Native American identity.

=== Thirteen American colonies ===
British colonial promoters initially envisioned that the American colonies could develop a strong economy along the lines of Asia's economies, which produced raw materials. They later circulated Indian manufactured goods between the two hemispheres, tying their commerce together.

Due to connections between the East India Company and the American colonies, some Indians (from places such as Bombay and Bengal) were sent to the latter for slavery or indentured servitude. Today, descendants of such East Indian slaves may have a small percent of DNA from Asian ancestors but it likely falls below the detectable levels for today's DNA tests, as most of the generations since would have been primarily of ethnic African and European ancestry.

Prior to 1776, Americans admired the expansion of the British Empire, feeling proud to be part of an expansion of British influence around the world.

=== American Revolution, the East India Company, and early America context ===
Thomas Paine was a notable critic who warned Americans against the evils of the British Empire. As Paine prepared and published his highly influential pamphlet Common Sense (January 1776), he was influenced by reports from 1775 on the East India Company's activities and parliamentary investigations in London. These events helped shape his anti-imperial perspective, informing indirect commentary on the imperial ventures in India. He saw the British East India Company's 1757 rise in Bengal as extortionate and foreshadowing what would happen to the United States if it failed to secure its independence. Heavy taxation on Indian commodities imported to the United States, such as high-quality fabrics, also played a role in creating discontent with British rule.

The flag of the East India Company is said to have inspired the Continental Union Flag of 1775, ultimately inspiring the current flag of the United States, as both flags were of the same design. Mysorean rockets were also used in the Battle of Baltimore, and are mentioned in "The Star-Spangled Banner", the national anthem of the United States: And the rockets' red glare, the bombs bursting in air.

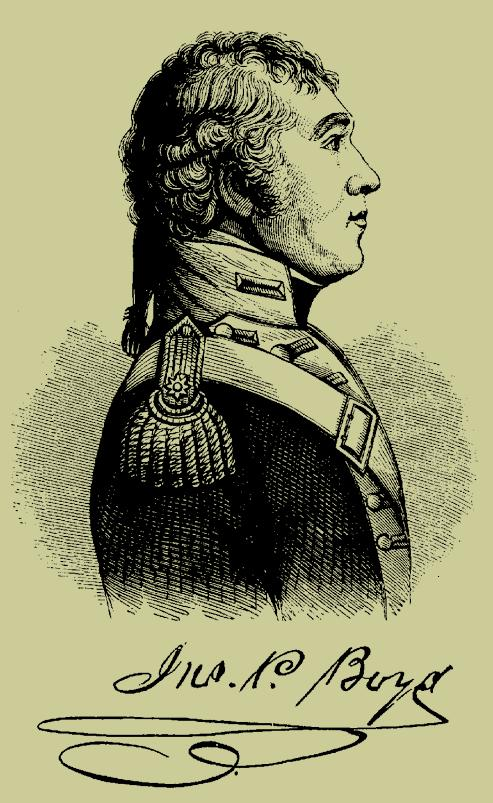
John Parker Boyd: American mercenary soldier who served the Maratha Empire in 1790s

==== Early American missionaries ====
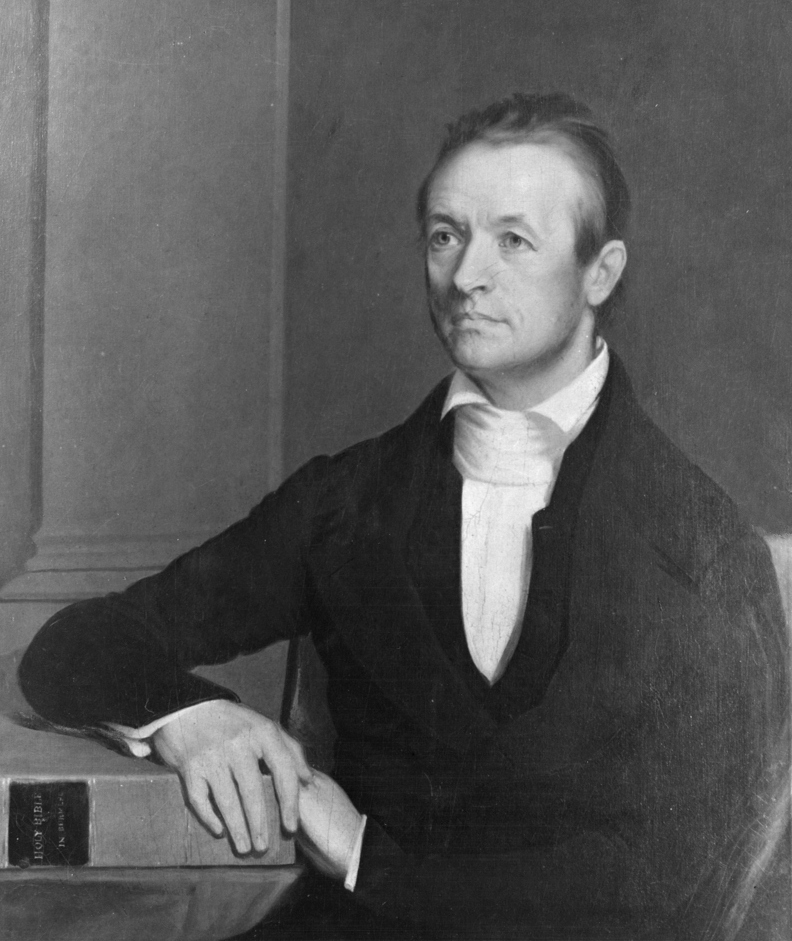
Adoniram Judson: The first Baptist American Missionary to India

Adoniram Judson was the first American missionary to go abroad. On June 17, 1812, the Judsons arrived in Calcutta. When the War of 1812 became known, British officials forced him to leave and he went to Burma in 1813, where he spent four decades as a missionay.

Charlotte White (1782-1863) was the first American woman appointed as a missionary and sent to a foreign country. Sponsored by the Baptist Board of Foreign Missions. she embarked for Calcutta, India, in December 1815.

Other American missionaries to India during the pre-British Raj era include: Lyman Jewett, Samuel B. Fairbank, Nathan Brown, John Welsh Dulles, Luther Rice, Samuel Newell, David Oliver Allen, Cynthia Farrar, Henry Richard Hoisington, Samuel Nott, Harriet Newell, George Warren Wood, Miron Winslow, Gordon Hall, Azubah Caroline Condit, Levi Spaulding, George Bowen, Ann Hasseltine Judson, George Boardman, Jeremiah Phillips, and William Arthur Stanton.

==== Other early Americans ====
American officer John Parker Boyd partook in the Battle of Kharda, fighting on the side of the Nizam of Hyderabad.

American Founding Father Aaron Burr had a relationship with an East Indian woman named Mary Emmons, who was most likely from the Indian city of Calcutta. Together, they had two children, including John Pierre Burr.

Dudley Leavitt Pickman was an early American trader with India who founded the East India Marine Society.

Fitzedward Hall was the first American to edit a Sanskrit text.

=== East India Company rule ===
American merchants found it harder to trade in India during Company rule. American governmental consuls were not recognized until the mid-19th century.

American reactions to the failed Indian Rebellion of 1857 saw a brief moment of hesitation around the idea of successfully expanding American influence abroad in an imperialistic manner.

=== Under British Raj (1858–1947) ===
During the 1861-65 American Civil War, American Union blockades of Southern cotton led to the Indian press speculating about the opportunity for India to export more of its cotton. The impact on the British economy also drove the construction of the Indian Railways forward, as faster transport assisted in exporting Indian cotton. In the United States, as Northerners fretted about the ultimate status of African American slaves, The New York Times argued in the weeks leading up to President Abraham Lincoln's Emancipation Proclamation that African Americans could never rise in American society above the "condition which the inferior castes of India have always occupied." India's inability to defend itself from British conquests was also referenced; Lincoln and his Secretary of State William H. Seward agreed on the need to maintain American unity in part to avoid a similar fate as that of British India, and throughout the previous decade, Southerners who sought to expand the institution of slavery to new territories referred to the rapid white conquest of places like India to justify colonizing nonwhite territories south of the United States (see also: Knights of the Golden Circle).

The 1869 opening of the Suez Canal was celebrated by famous American poet Walt Whitman, who saw it as a way to connect West and East and tie into the last stage of global consolidation through American expansion.

President Theodore Roosevelt saw British rule in India as a model for what the United States ought to do in ruling the Philippines in the early 20th century.

Indian–American relations
- India: United States

==== Religious connections ====
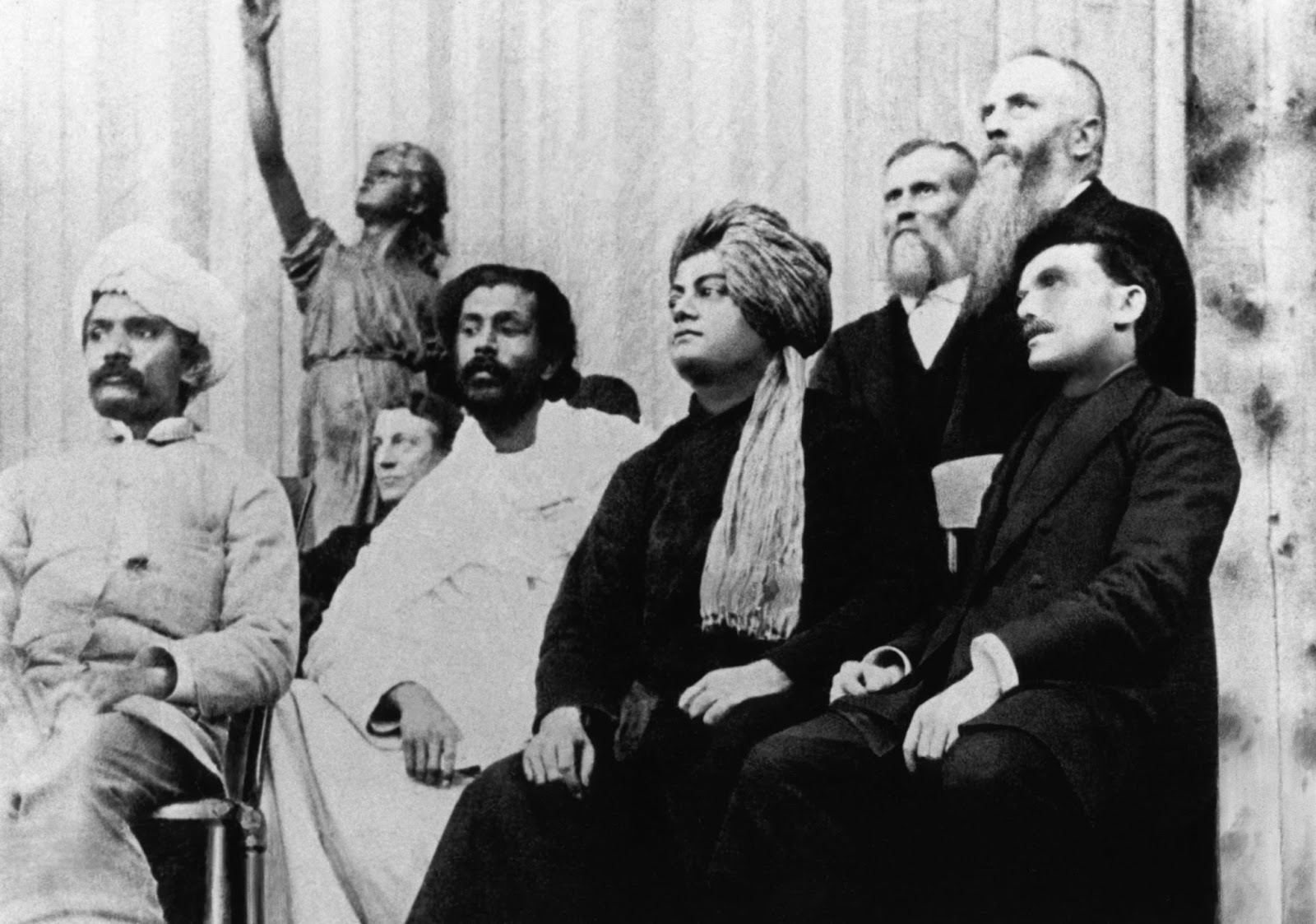
Swami Vivekananda at the Parliament of Religions with Virchand Gandhi, Hewivitarne Dharmapala, and A. G. Bonet-Maury in September 1893

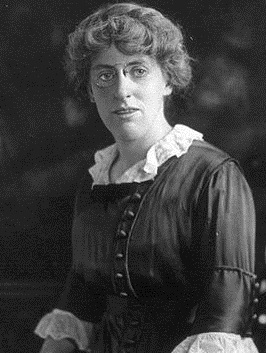
Margaret Woodrow Wilson, daughter of Woodrow Wilson, left to India for her later life

The relationships between India in the days of the British Raj and the United States were thick. Swami Vivekananda promoted Yoga and Vedanta in the United States at the World's Parliament of Religions in Chicago, during the World's Fair in 1893. Mark Twain visited India in 1896 and described it in his travelogue Following the Equator with both revulsion and attraction before concluding that India was the only foreign land he dreamed about or longed to see again. Regarding India, Americans learned more from English writer Rudyard Kipling. Mahatma Gandhi had an important influence on the philosophy of non-violence promoted by American civil rights movement leader Martin Luther King Jr. in the 1950s.

Former American Military Officer and later a prominent figure in the spiritual and philosophical movement of Theosophy Henry Steel Olcott, left New York in December 1878 to relocate the headquarters of the Theosophical Society to India. He and the society arrived in Bombay on February 16, 1879. Olcott's objective was to immerse himself in the culture of India, the birthplace of his spiritual inspiration, the Buddha. The Society's headquarters were established at Adyar, Chennai, where Olcott also founded the Adyar Library and Research Centre. He aimed to obtain authentic translations of sacred texts from Buddhist, Hindu, and Zoroastrian religions to provide Westerners with a true understanding of Eastern philosophies, countering Westernized interpretations. Throughout his time in India, Olcott worked tirelessly to bridge the cultural and spiritual gap between East and West. He died in Adyar, Madras on the 17th of February, 1907.

Margaret Woodrow Wilson, the daughter of the 28th U.S. President Woodrow Wilson, became a devotee and member of the ashram of Sri Aurobindo in Pondicherry for the remainder of her later life. Wilson changed her name to Nistha, meaning "dedication" in Sanskrit. In 1942, she collaborated with Joseph Campbell, as they undertook the editing of the English translation of The Gospel of Sri Ramakrishna, originally authored by Swami Nikhilananda, a classical work on the Hindu mystic Sri Ramakrishna. This edited version was subsequently published by the Ramakrishna-Vivekananda Center in New York. She died in Pondicherry on the 12th of February, 1944.

==== American missionaries during the British Raj ====
During the British Raj, there were multiple American missionaries sent to India, including the well known Scudder family, Ralph T. Templin, James Mills Thoburn, Mary W. Bacheler, James Mudge, J. Waskom Pickett, Edward Winter Clark, Miles Bronson, Samuel H. Kellogg, John Nelson Hyde, Nancie Monelle, Lucy Whitehead McGill Waterbury Peabody, Crawford R. Thoburn, Elwood Morris Wherry, Murray Thurston Titus, Titanic victim Annie Funk, Frederick Bohn Fisher, British Raj born & World War II victim Robert M. Hanson, British Raj born Victor Clough Rambo, Hervey De Witt Griswold, British Raj born Robert Ernest Hume, British Raj born John Lawrence Goheen, British Raj born John William Theodore Youngs, Beatrice Marian Smyth, Anna Sarah Kugler, William H. Wiser, Julia Jacobs Harpster, Charlotte C. Wyckoff, Isabella Thoburn, and American expatriate turned Indian freedom fighter Satyananda Stokes.

The Scudder family was renowned for its multigenerational missionary work in India, particularly in the fields of medicine, education, and Christian evangelism. Led by Dr. John Scudder Sr., who arrived in South Asia in 1819 as one of the first medical missionaries sent by the American Board of Commissioners for Foreign Missions (ABCFM), the family established hospitals and dispensaries across the region. Dr. John Scudder Jr. continued this legacy, founding the Arcot Mission in Vellore, Tamil Nadu, and later the Ceylon Mission in Sri Lanka. Notably, Dr. Ida Scudder, granddaughter of Dr. John Scudder Sr., established the Christian Medical College and Hospital in Vellore in 1900, which has since become one of India's leading medical institutions. The Scudder family's enduring commitment to healthcare and education has left a lasting impact on India's social and medical landscape, inspiring generations of missionaries and healthcare professionals.

The YMCA played a significant role in encouraging the development of sport in the princely states, as well as helping to improve agricultural output in rural areas.

==== President Franklin D. Roosevelt ====
In the 1930s and early-1940s, U.S. President Franklin D. Roosevelt voiced strong support to the Indian independence movement despite being allies with Britain. The first significant immigration from India before 1965 involved Sikh farmers going to California in the early twentieth century.

==== Case of Bhagat Singh Thind ====
United States v. Bhagat Singh Thind was a landmark legal case in the United States that reverberated through issues of immigration, citizenship, and race. In 1920, Bhagat Singh Thind, an Indian Sikh man, applied for naturalization under the Naturalization Act of 1906, which permitted naturalization only for "free white persons" and "persons of African nativity or descent." Thind contended that his high-caste Indian heritage aligned with the scientific definition of "Caucasian," thereby qualifying him for citizenship."

The case reached the Supreme Court of the United States in 1923. However, the Court unanimously ruled against Thind, asserting that while he might indeed meet the scientific classification of "Caucasian," the term "white person" in the naturalization laws was construed to apply exclusively to individuals of European descent. The Court argued that Congress did not intend for this term to encompass individuals from Asia.

This pivotal decision had far-reaching implications, not only for Thind but for countless other South Asians aspiring for U.S. citizenship. It set a legal precedent that explicitly excluded South Asians from being considered "white" for naturalization purposes, effectively prohibiting their path to citizenship.

Despite the setback, Bhagat Singh Thind remained in the United States, contributing significantly as a lecturer and writer on Sikhism and Indian culture. His perseverance in the face of legal adversity underscores the resilience of marginalized communities in navigating discriminatory legal frameworks.

United States v. Bhagat Singh Thind stands as a significant milestone in U.S. legal history, shedding light on the intricate intersections of immigration, citizenship, and racial identity. It serves as a poignant reminder of the biases entrenched within immigration laws and the complexities of racial classifications in American society.

==== During World War II ====
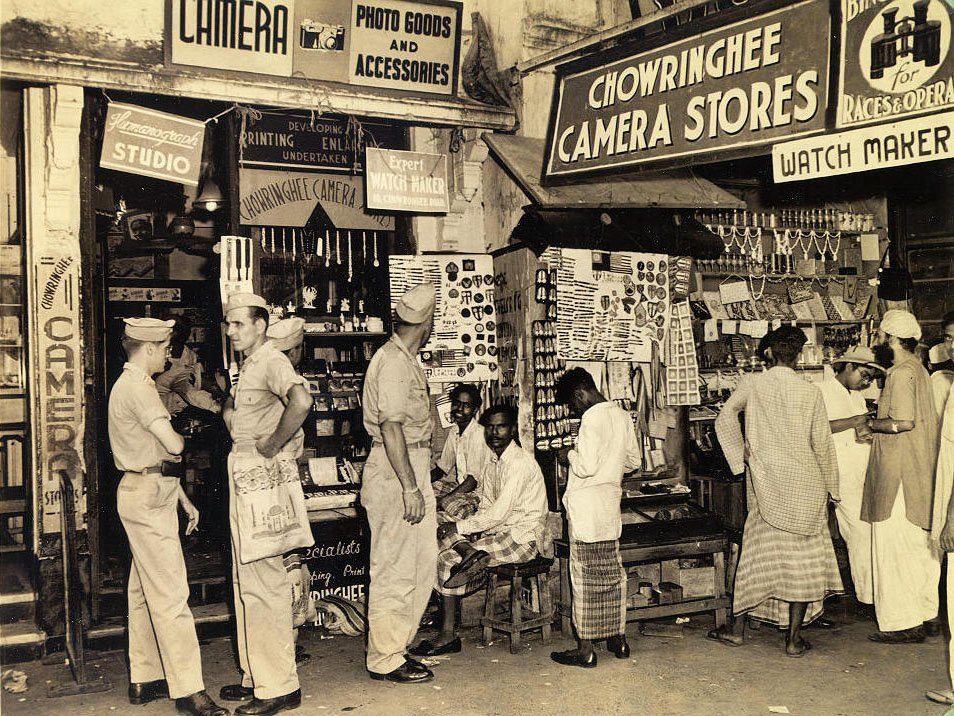
American G.I.s at a market in Calcutta in present-day Kolkata in 1945

During World War II, 1941–1945, India became the main base for the American China Burma India Theater (CBI) in the war against Japan. Tens of thousands of American servicemen arrived, bringing all sorts of advanced technology, and currency; they left in 1945. Serious tension erupted over American demands, led by U.S. President Franklin D. Roosevelt, that India be given independence, a proposition Churchill vehemently rejected. For years, Roosevelt encouraged British disengagement from India. The American position was based on an opposition to Europeans having colonies and a practical concern for the outcome of the war, and the expectation of a large American role in a post-independence era. Churchill threatened to resign if Roosevelt continued to push his case, causing Roosevelt to back down.

Meanwhile, India became the main American staging base to fly aid to China. During World War II, the Panagarh Airport in Bengal Province of India was used as a supply transport airfield from 1942 to 1945 by the United States Army Air Forces Tenth Air Force and as a repair and maintenance depot for B-24 Liberator heavy bombers by Air Technical Service Command.

== Contemporary era ==
=== Founding of postcolonial India ===
B. R. Ambedkar, an architect of the Indian Constitution, received his education at Columbia University from John Dewey.

=== After Independence (1947–1997) ===
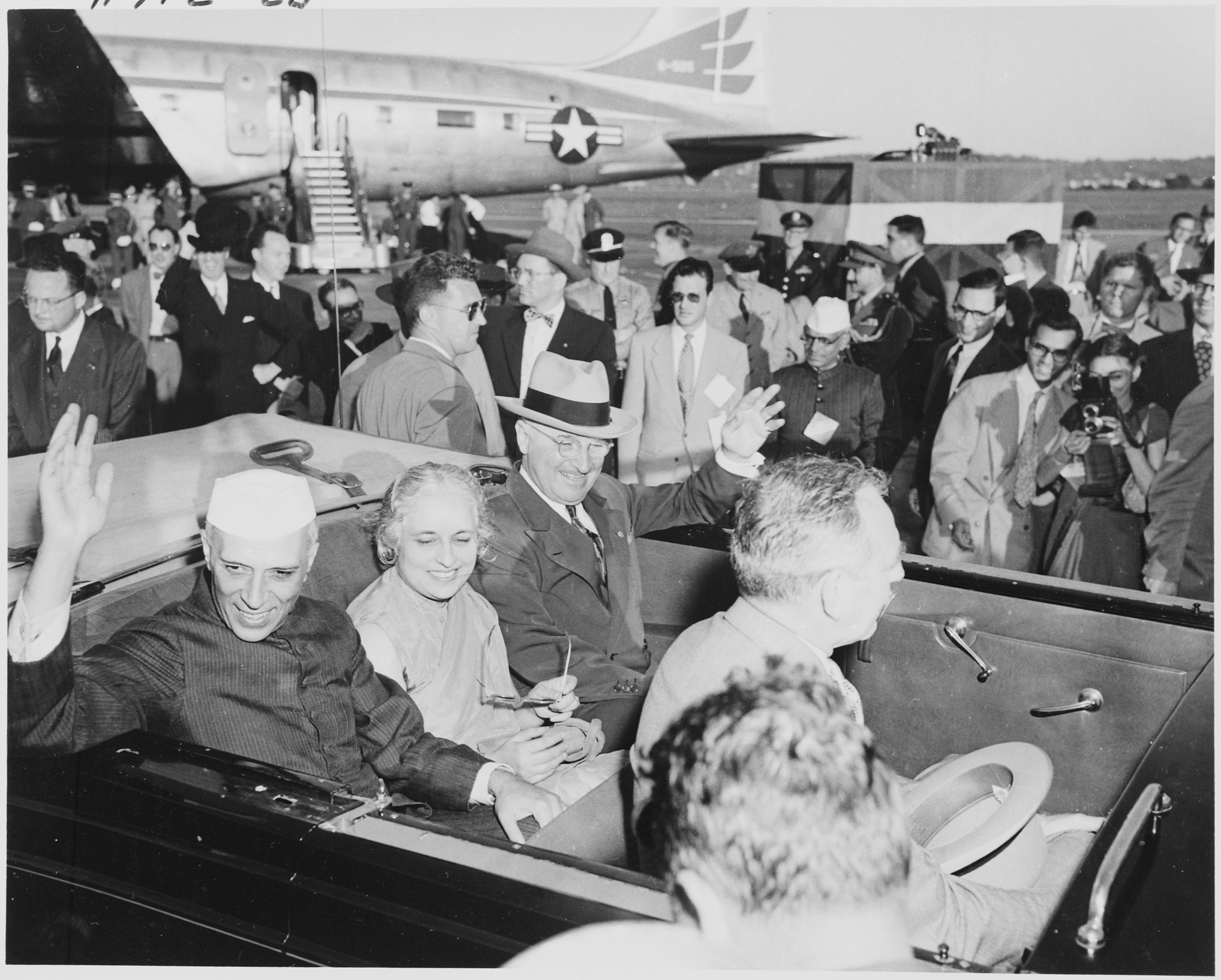
U.S. President Harry S. Truman and Indian Prime Minister Jawaharlal Nehru with Nehru's sister, Vijayalakshmi Pandit, Indian ambassador to the United States, in Washington, D.C. in October 1949

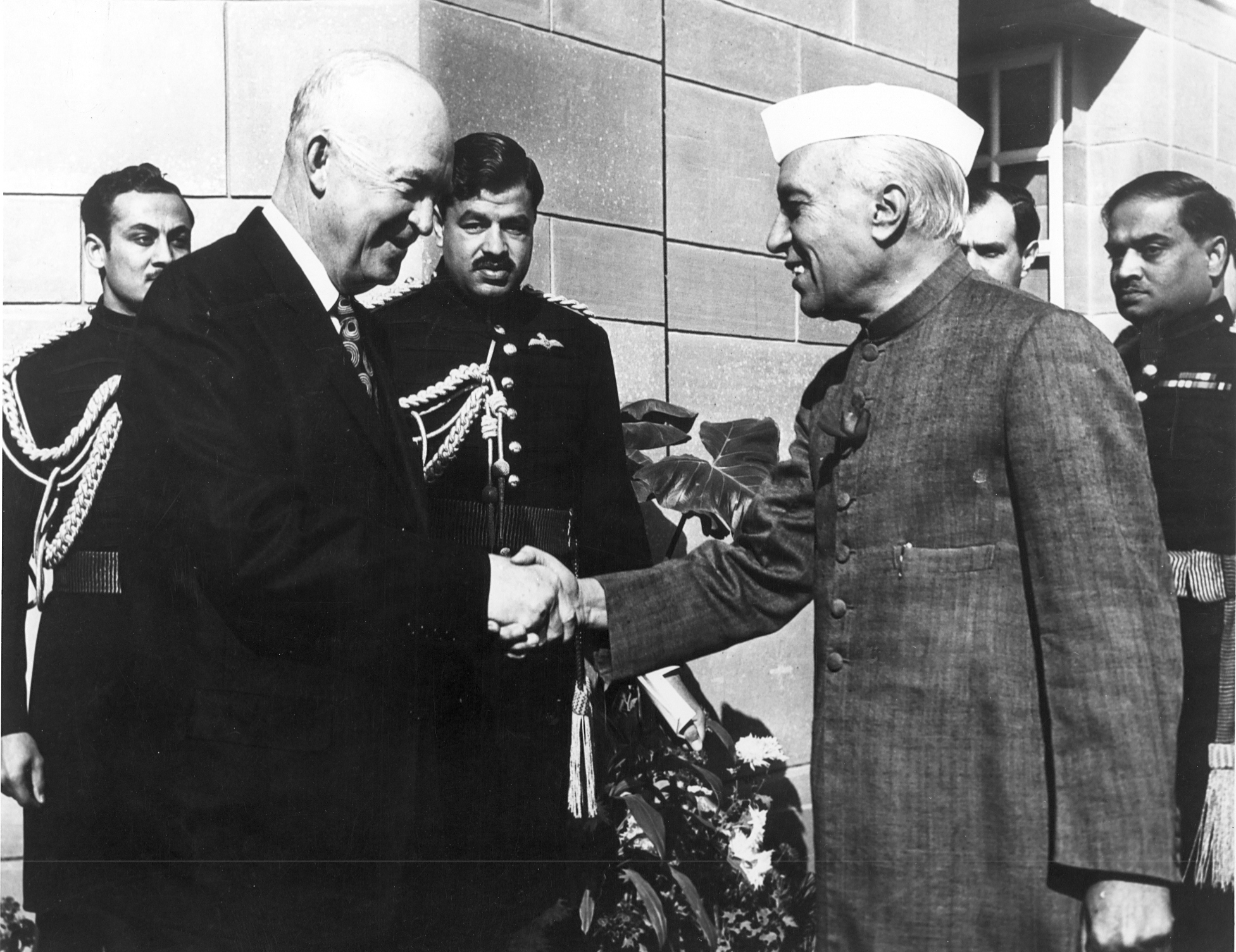
Prime Minister Jawaharlal Nehru receiving U.S. President Dwight D. Eisenhower at Parliament House prior to Eisenhower's address to a joint session of Parliament of India in 1959

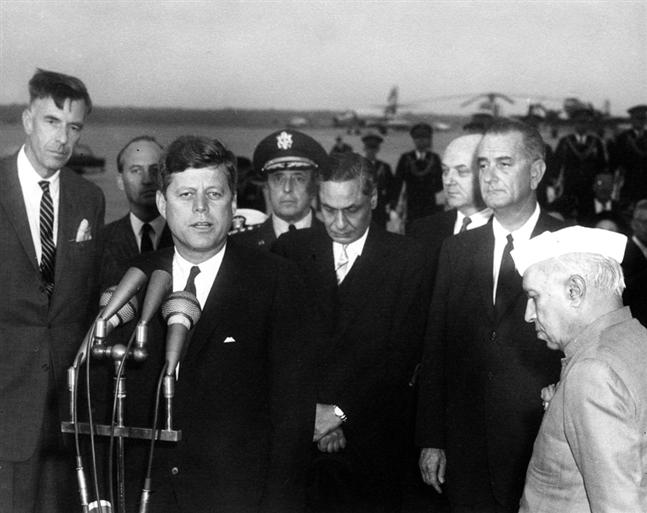
U.S. ambassador to India John Kenneth Galbraith (left) and U.S. President John F. Kennedy, U.S. Vice President Lyndon B. Johnson, and Indian Prime Minister Jawaharlal Nehru at Joint Base Andrews in Prince George's County, Maryland in 1961

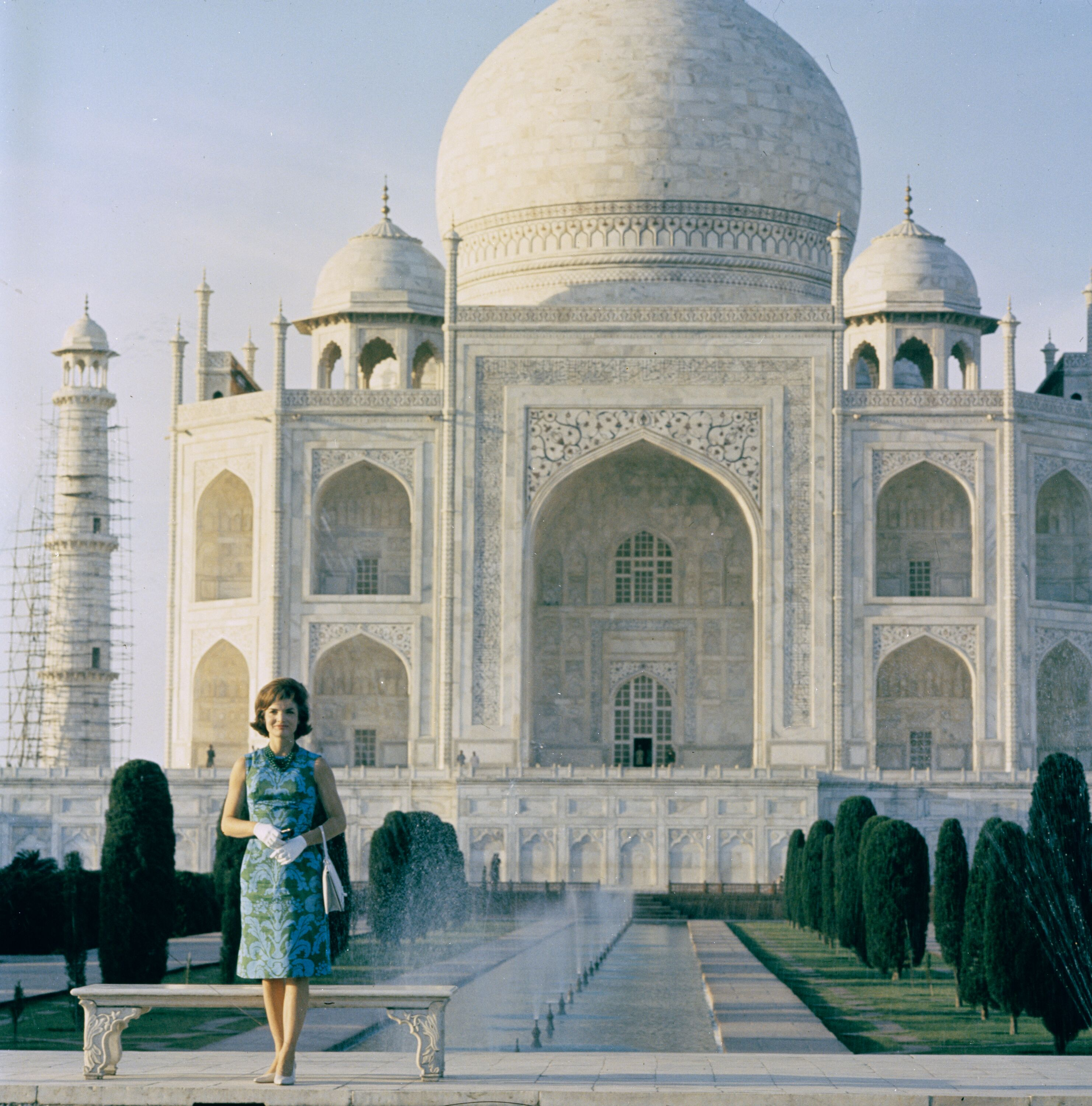
First lady Jacqueline Kennedy in front of the Taj Mahal in 1962.

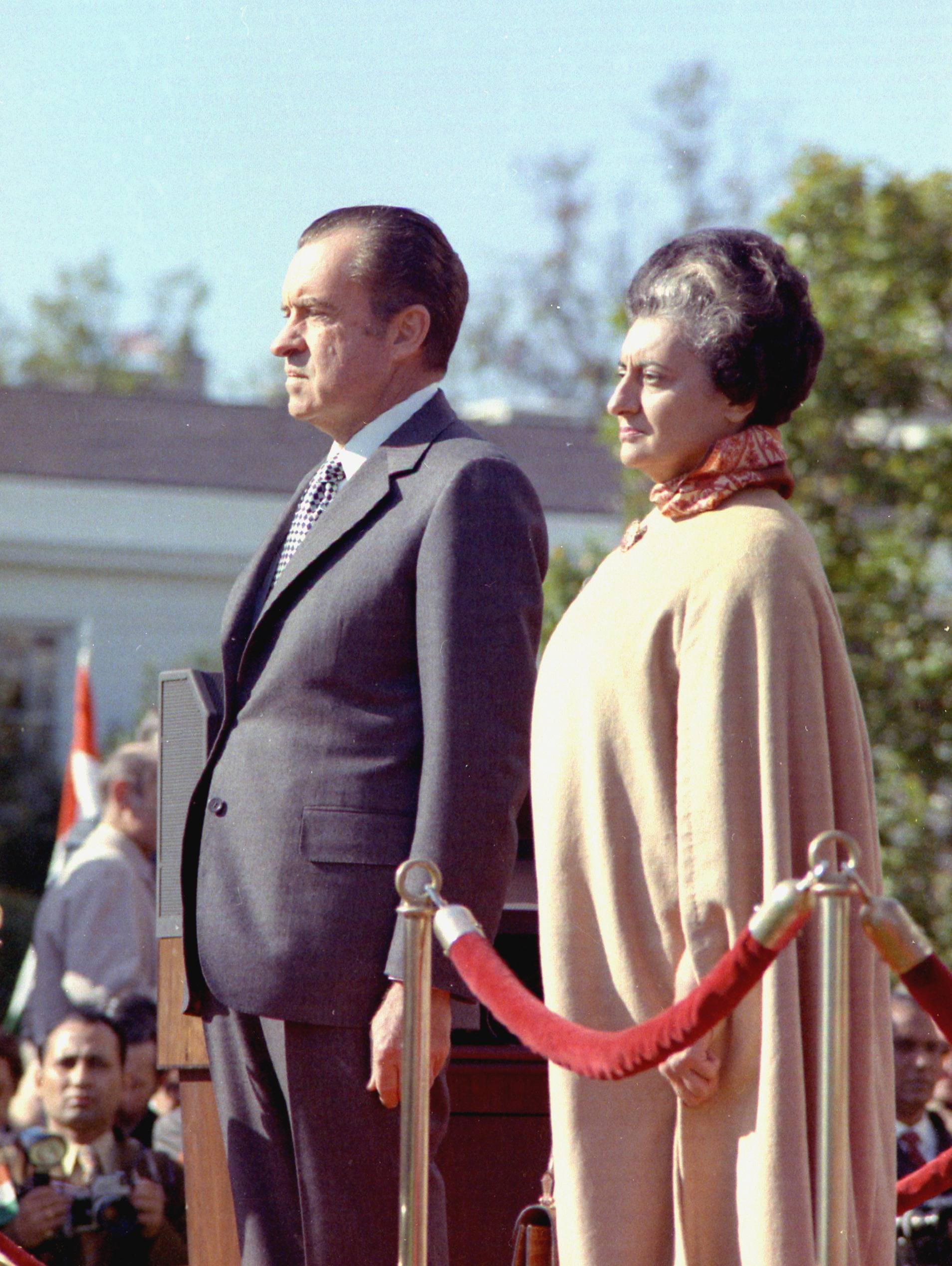
U.S. President Richard Nixon at the arrival ceremony for Indian Prime Minister Indira Gandhi on the South Lawn of the White House in November 1971

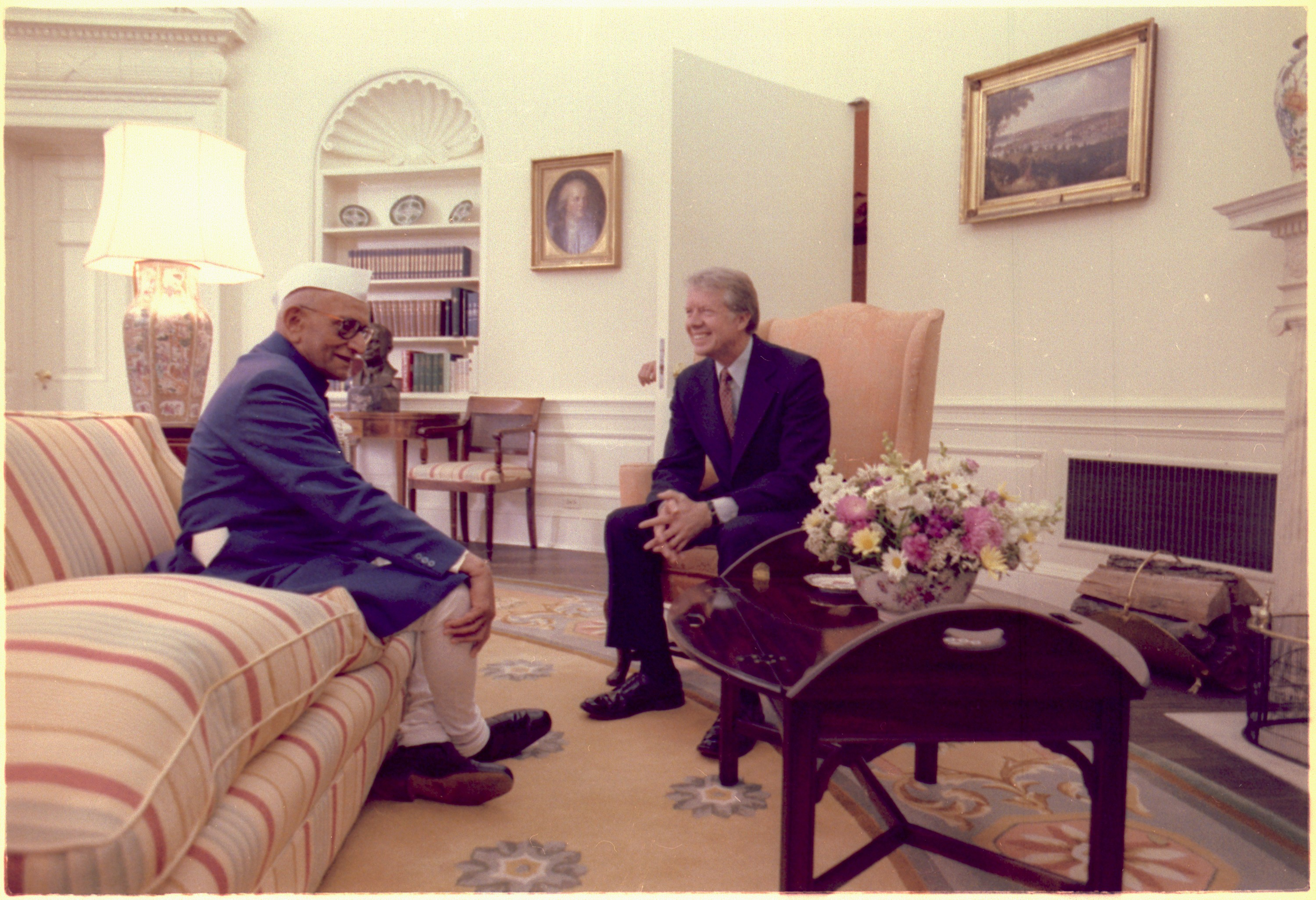
Indian Prime Minister Morarji Desai in the Oval Office with U.S. President Jimmy Carter in June 1978

==== 1947–1965 ====
The United States under the Truman administration leaned towards favouring India in the late-1940s as a consequence of most U.S. planners seeing India more valuable diplomatically than neighboring Pakistan. However, during the Cold War, Nehru's policy of neutrality was cumbersome to many American observers. American officials perceived India's policy of non-alignment negatively. Ambassador Henry F. Grady told then-Indian Prime Minister Jawaharlal Nehru that the United States did not consider neutrality to be an acceptable position. Grady told the State Department in December 1947 that he had informed Nehru "that this is a question that cannot be straddled and that India should get on the democratic side immediately". In 1948, Nehru rejected American suggestions for resolving the Kashmir crisis via third party mediation.

Nehru's 1949 tour of the United States was "an undiplomatic disaster" that left bad feelings on both sides. Nehru and his top aide V. K. Krishna Menon discussed whether India should "align with United States 'somewhat' and build up our economic and military strength." The Truman administration was quite favorable and indicated it would give Nehru anything he asked for. Nehru refused, and thereby forfeited the chance for a gift of one million tons of wheat. The American Secretary of State Dean Acheson recognized Nehru's potential world role but added that he was "one of the most difficult men with whom I have ever had to deal." The American visit had some benefits in that Nehru gained widespread understanding and support for his nation, and he himself gained a much deeper understanding of the American outlook.

India rejected the American advice that it should not recognize the Communist conquest of China, but it did back the US when it supported the 1950 United Nations resolution condemning North Korea's aggression in the Korean War. India tried to act as a mediator to help end the war, and served as a conduit for diplomatic messages between the US and China. Although no Indian troops took part in the war, India did send a Medical Corps of 346 army doctors to help the UN side.

Meanwhile, poor harvests forced India to ask for American aid for its food security, which was given starting in 1950. In the first dozen years of Indian independence (1947–59), the US provided $1.700,000,000 in aid; including $931,000,000 in food. The Soviet Union provided about half as much in monetary terms, however made much larger contributions in kind, taking the form of infrastructural aid, soft loans, technical knowledge transfer, economic planning and skills involved in the areas of steel mills, machine building, hydroelectric power and other heavy industries, especially nuclear energy and space research. In 1961, the U.S. pledged $1,000,000,000 in development loans, in addition to $1,300,000,000 of free food. To ease the tensions, Eisenhower sent John Sherman Cooper as ambassador in 1956–57. Cooper got along very well with Nehru.

In terms of rhetoric, Jawaharlal Nehru—as both prime minister and foreign minister (1947–64), promoted a moralistic rhetoric attacking both the Soviet bloc and the U.S. and its bloc. Instead Nehru tried to build a nonaligned movement, paying special attention to the many new nations in the Third World released from European colonial status at this time. President Dwight D. Eisenhower and his Secretary of State John Foster Dulles themselves used moralistic rhetoric to attack the evils of Communism.

In 1959, Eisenhower became the first U.S. president to visit India to strengthen the staggering ties between the two nations. He was so supportive that the New York Times remarked, "It did not seem to matter much whether Nehru had actually requested or been given a guarantee that the US would help India to meet further Chinese Communist aggression. What mattered was the obvious strengthening of Indian–American friendship to a point where no such guarantee was necessary."

During John F. Kennedy's presidency from 1961 to 1963, India was considered a strategic partner and counterweight to the rise of Communist China. Kennedy said,

"Chinese Communists have been moving ahead the last 10 years. India has been making some progress, but if India does not succeed with her 450 million people, if she can't make freedom work, then people around the world are going to determine, particularly in the underdeveloped world, that the only way they can develop their resources is through the Communist system."

Relations took a nosedive when India annexed the Portuguese colony of Goa in 1961, in which the Kennedy administration condemned the armed action of the Indian government and demanded that all Indian forces be unconditionally withdrawn from Goan soil, at the same time, cutting all foreign aid appropriation to India by 25 percent. In response, Menon, now the Minister of Defence, lectured Kennedy on the importance of US-Soviet compromise and dismissed the admonishments of Kennedy and Stevenson as "vestige(s) of Western imperialism".

The Kennedy administration openly supported India during the 1962 Sino-Indian war and considered the Chinese action as "blatant Chinese Communist aggression against India". The United States Air Force flew in arms, ammunition and clothing supplies to the Indian troops and the United States Navy sent the USS Kitty Hawk aircraft carrier from the Pacific Ocean to India, though it was recalled before it reached the Bay of Bengal since the crisis had passed. In a May 1963 National Security Council meeting, the United States discussed contingency planning that could be implemented in the event of another Chinese aggression on India. Defense Secretary Robert McNamara and General Maxwell Taylor advised the president to use nuclear weapons should the Americans intervene in such a situation. Kennedy insisted that Washington defend India as it would any ally, saying, "We should defend India, and therefore we will defend India." Kennedy's ambassador to India was the noted liberal economist John Kenneth Galbraith, who was considered close to India. While in India, Galbraith helped establish one of the first Indian computer science departments, at the Indian Institute of Technology in Kanpur, Uttar Pradesh.

==== 1965 - 1992 ====
Following the assassination of Kennedy in 1963, India-US relations deteriorated gradually. While Kennedy's successor Lyndon B. Johnson sought to maintain relations with India to counter Communist China, he also sought to strengthen ties with Pakistan with the hopes of easing tensions with China and weakening India's growing military buildup as well.

Relations then hit an all-time low under the Nixon administration in the early 1970s. Nixon shifted away from the neutral stance which his predecessors had taken towards India-Pakistan hostilities. He established a very close relationship with Pakistan, aiding it militarily and economically, as India, now under the leadership of Indira Gandhi, was leaning towards Soviet Union. He considered Pakistan as a very important ally to counter Soviet influence in the Indian subcontinent and establish ties with China, with whom Pakistan was very close. The frosty personal relationship between Nixon and Indira further contributed to the poor relationship between the two nations. Nixon also harbored sexist and racist sentiments against Indians, describing the empathetic attitude of the American public toward India as a "psychological disorder". During the 1971 Indo-Pakistani War, the US openly supported Pakistan and deployed its aircraft carrier USS Enterprise towards the Bay of Bengal, which was seen as a show of force by the US in support of the West Pakistani forces. (See also: Bangladesh–United States relations#History)

Later in 1974, India conducted its first nuclear test, Smiling Buddha, which was opposed by the US, however it also concluded that the test did not violate any agreement and proceeded with a June 1974 shipment of enriched uranium for the Tarapur reactor. In the late 1970s, with the Janata Party leader Morarji Desai becoming the prime minister, India improved its relations with the US, led by Jimmy Carter, despite the latter signing an order in 1978 barring nuclear material from being exported to India due to India's non-proliferation record.

Despite the return of Indira Gandhi to power in 1980, the relations between the two countries continued to improve gradually, although India did not support the United States in its role in the Soviet invasion and occupation of Afghanistan. Indian Foreign Minister P. V. Narasimha Rao expressed "grave concern" over the United States's decision to "rearm" Pakistan; the two countries were working closely together to counter the Soviets in Afghanistan. The Reagan administration led by US President Ronald Reagan provided limited assistance to India. India sounded out Washington on the purchase of a range of US defence technology, including F-5 aircraft, super computers, night vision goggles and radars. In 1984, Washington approved the supply of selected technology to India including gas turbines for naval frigates and engines for prototypes for India's light combat aircraft. There were also unpublicised transfers of technology, including the engagement of a US company, Continental Electronics, to design and build a new VLF communications station at Tirunelveli in Tamil Nadu, which was commissioned in the late 1980s.

==== 1993–1997 ====
Under Bill Clinton (President 1993–2001) and P. V. Narasimha Rao (Prime Minister 1991–1996) both sides mishandled relations, according to Arthur G. Rubinoff. Clinton simultaneously pressured India to liberalize its economy while criticizing New Delhi on human rights and nuclear issues. In the face of criticism from Washington and opposition at home, Indian leaders lost their enthusiasm for rapprochement and reverted to formalistic protocol over substantive diplomacy. The Brown Amendment that restored American aid to Pakistan in 1995 was an irritant. In returning to a Cold War style rhetoric, Indian parliamentarians and American congressmen demonstrated their unwillingness to establish a new relationship.

=== NDA I and II governments (1998–2004) ===
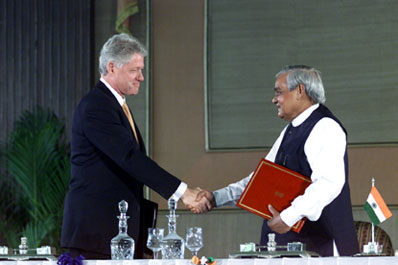
Indian Prime Minister Atal Bihari Vajpayee with U.S. President Bill Clinton at Hyderabad House in New Delhi in March 2000

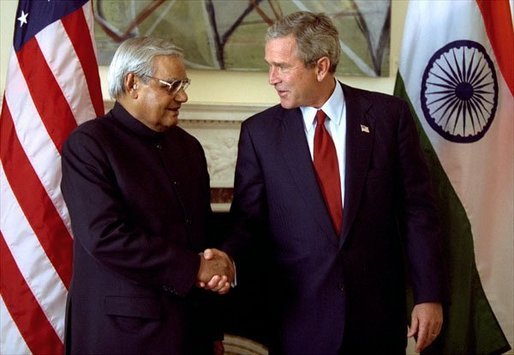
Indian Prime Minister Atal Bihari Vajpayee with U.S. President George W. Bush in New York City in September 2003

Soon after Atal Bihari Vajpayee became Indian prime minister, he authorised nuclear weapons testing at Pokhran. The United States strongly condemned this testing, promised sanctions, and voted in favor of a United Nations Security Council resolution condemning the tests. President Bill Clinton imposed economic sanctions on India, including cutting off all military and economic aid, freezing loans by American banks to state-owned Indian companies, prohibiting loans to the Indian government for all except food purchases, prohibiting American aerospace technology and uranium exports to India, and requiring the US to oppose all loan requests by India to international lending agencies. However, these sanctions proved ineffective – India was experiencing a strong economic rise, and its trade with the US only constituted a small portion of its GDP. Only Japan joined the US in imposing direct sanctions, while most other nations continued to trade with India. The sanctions were soon lifted. Afterward, the Clinton administration and Prime Minister Vajpayee exchanged representatives to help rebuild relations. In March 2000, Clinton visited India, undertaking bilateral and economic discussions with Vajpayee. This would mark the first U.S. presidential trip to India since 1978. During the visit, the Indo-US Science & Technology Forum was established.

Over the course of improved diplomatic relations with the Bush administration, India agreed to allow close international monitoring of its nuclear weapons development, although it has refused to give up its current nuclear arsenal. In 2004, the US decided to grant Major non-NATO ally (MNNA) status to Pakistan. The US extended the MNNA strategic working relationship to India but the offer was turned down. After the September 11 attacks against the US in 2001, President George W. Bush collaborated closely with India in controlling and policing the strategically critical Indian Ocean sea lanes from the Suez Canal to Singapore.

=== UPA I and II governments (2004–2014) ===
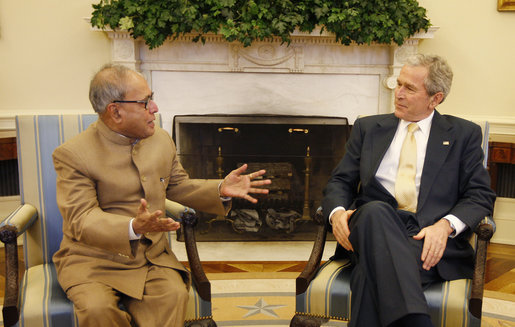
Indian Minister of External Affairs Pranab Mukherjee in the Oval Office with U.S. President George W. Bush in March 2008

During the George W. Bush administration, relations between India and the United States blossomed, primarily over common concerns regarding growing Islamic extremism, energy security, and climate change. George W. Bush commented, "India is a great example of democracy. It is very devout, has diverse religious heads, but everyone is comfortable about their religion. The world needs India". Journalist Fareed Zakaria, in his book The Post-American World, described Bush as "being the most pro-Indian president in American history." Similar sentiments are echoed by Rejaul Karim Laskar, a scholar of Indian foreign policy and ideologue of Indian National Congress – the largest constituent of the United Progressive Alliance (UPA). According to Laskar, the UPA rule has seen a "transformation in bilateral ties with the US", as a result of which the relations now covers "a wide range of issues, including high technology, space, education, agriculture, trade, clean energy, counter-terrorism, etc".

After the December 2004 tsunami, the US and Indian navies cooperated in search and rescue operations and in the reconstruction of affected areas. Since 2004, Washington and New Delhi have been pursuing a "strategic partnership" that is based on shared values and generally convergent geopolitical interests. Numerous economic, security, and global initiatives, including plans for civilian nuclear cooperation, are underway. First launched in 2005, cooperation on nuclear weapons reversed three decades of American non-proliferation policy. Also in 2005, United States and India signed a ten-year defense framework agreement, with the goal of expanding bilateral security cooperation.

The two countries engaged in numerous and unprecedented combined military exercises, and major US arms sales to India were concluded. An Open Skies Agreement was signed in April 2005, enhancing trade, tourism, and business via the increased number of flights, and Air India purchased 68 US Boeing aircraft at a cost of $8 billion. The United States and India also signed a bilateral Agreement on Science and Technology Cooperation in 2005. After Hurricane Katrina, India donated $5 million to the American Red Cross and sent two planeloads of relief supplies and materials to help. Then, on 1 March 2006, President Bush made another diplomatic visit to further expand relations between India and the U.S. The value of all bilateral trade tripled from 2004 to 2008 and continued to grow, while significant two-way investment also grows and flourishes. The political influence of a large Indian-American community is reflected in the largest country-specific caucus in the United States Congress, while between 2009 and 2010 more than 100,000 Indian students have attended American colleges and universities. In November 2010, President Barack Obama visited India and addressed a joint session of the Indian Parliament, where he backed India's bid for a permanent seat on the United Nations Security Council.

==== Strategic and military determinants ====
In March 2009, the Obama administration cleared the US$2.1 billion sale of eight P-8 Poseidons to India. This deal, and the $5 billion agreement to provide Boeing C-17 military transport aircraft and General Electric F414 engines announced during Obama's November 2010 visit, made the US one of the top three military suppliers to India (after Israel and Russia).

US Chairman of the Joint Chiefs of Staff Mike Mullen encouraged stronger military ties between the two nations, and said that "India has emerged as an increasingly important strategic partner [of the US]". US Undersecretary of State William J. Burns also said, "Never has there been a moment when India and America mattered more to each other." The Deputy Secretary of Defense, Ashton Carter, during his address to the Asia Society in New York City on August 1, 2012, said that India–US relationship has a global scope, in terms of the reach and influence of both countries. He also said that both countries are strengthening the relations between their defense and research organizations.

==== US Spying Incidents ====
India, in July and November 2013, demanded that the U.S. respond to allegations that the Indian UN mission in New York City and the Indian Embassy in Washington, D.C. had been targeted for spying. On July 2, 2014, U.S. diplomats were summoned by the Indian Ministry of External Affairs to discuss allegations that the National Security Agency had spied upon private individuals and political entities within India. A 2010 document leaked by Edward Snowden and published by The Washington Post revealed that US intelligence agencies had been authorized to spy on the Indian Prime Minister Narendra Modi (who was then the chief minister of Gujarat).

WikiLeaks revelations that Western intelligence agencies have used foreign aid workers and staff at non-governmental organizations as non-official cover prompted India to step-up the monitoring of satellite phones and movement of personnel working for humanitarian relief organisations and development aid agencies in the vicinity of sensitive locations.

==== Foreign policy issues during the early 2010s ====
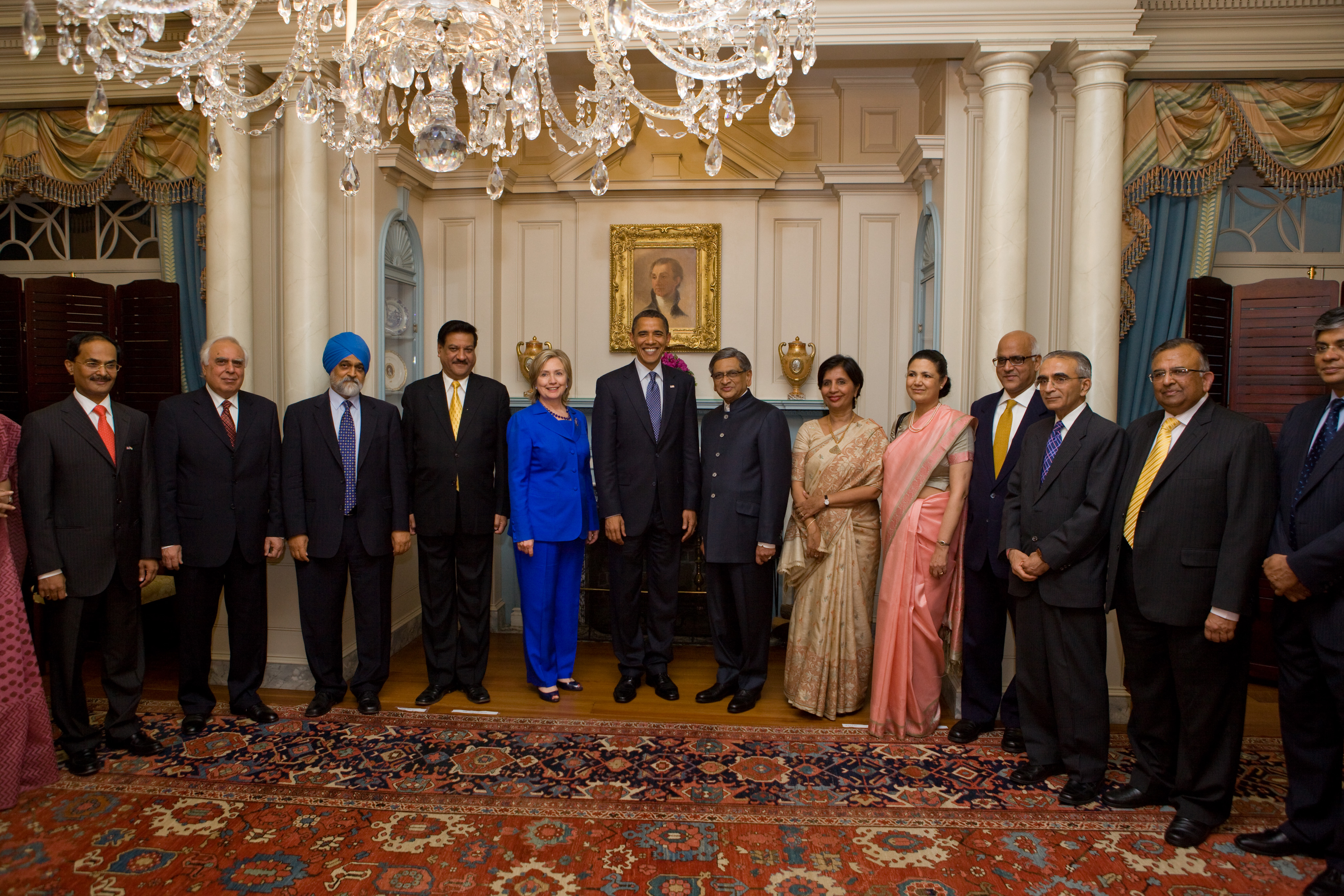
President Barack Obama, U.S. Secretary of State Hillary Clinton, and the Indian delegation at the U.S.-India Strategic Dialogue reception at the U.S. Department of State in Washington, D.C. in June 2010

According to some analysts, India–U.S. relations have been strained over the Obama administration's approach to Pakistan and the handling of the Taliban insurgency in Afghanistan. India's National Security Adviser M. K. Narayanan criticized the Obama administration for linking the Kashmir dispute to the instability in Pakistan and Afghanistan, and said that by doing so, President Obama was "barking up the wrong tree." Foreign Policy in February 2009 also criticized Obama's approach to South Asia, saying that "India can be a part of the solution rather than part of the problem" in South Asia. It also suggested that India take a more proactive role in rebuilding Afghanistan, irrespective of the attitude of the Obama administration. In a clear indication of the growing rift between the two countries, India decided not to accept a US invitation to attend a conference on Afghanistan at the end of February 2009. Bloomberg has also reported that, since the 2008 Mumbai attacks, the public mood in India has been to pressure Pakistan more aggressively to take actions against the culprits behind the terrorist attack, and that this might reflect on the upcoming Indian general elections in May 2009. Consequently, the Obama administration may find itself at odds with India's rigid stance against terrorism.

In the early 2010s, India and US governments have differed on a variety of regional issues ranging from America's military relations with Pakistan and India's military relations with Russia to foreign policy disagreements relating to Iran, Sri Lanka, Maldives, Myanmar and Bangladesh.

Robert Blake, Assistant Secretary of State for South and Central Asian Affairs, dismissed any concerns over a rift with India regarding American Af-Pak policy. Calling India and the United States "natural allies", Blake said that the United States cannot afford to meet the strategic priorities in Pakistan and Afghanistan at "the expense of India".

India criticized the Obama administration's decision to limit H-1B (temporary) visas, and India's then External Affairs Minister Pranab Mukherjee (later, the president of India until 2017) said that India would oppose US "protectionism" at various international forums. India's Commerce Minister Kamal Nath said that India may move against Obama's outsourcing policies at the World Trade Organization.

In May 2009, Obama reiterated his anti-outsourcing views and criticized the current US tax policy "that says you should pay lower taxes if you create a job in Bangalore, India, than if you create one in Buffalo, New York." However, during the US India Business Council meeting in June 2009, U.S. Secretary of State Hillary Clinton advocated for stronger economic ties between India and the United States. She also rebuked protectionist policies, saying that the U.S will not use the 2008 financial crisis as an excuse to implement protectionism.

In June 2010, the United States and India formally re-engaged the US-India Strategic Dialogue initiated under President Bush when a large delegation of high-ranking Indian officials, led by External Affairs Minister S. M. Krishna, visited Washington, D.C. As leader of the US delegation, Secretary of State Clinton lauded India as "an indispensable partner and a trusted friend". President Obama appeared briefly at a United States Department of State reception to declare his firm belief that America's relationship with India "will be one of the defining partnerships of the 21st century." The Strategic Dialogue produced a joint statement in which the two countries pledged to "deepen people-to-people, business-to-business, and government-to-government linkages ... for the mutual benefit of both countries and for the promotion of global peace, stability, economic growth and prosperity." It outlined extensive bilateral initiatives in ten key areas: (1) advancing global security and countering terrorism, (2) disarmament and nonproliferation, (3) trade and economic relations, (4) high technology, (5) energy security, clean energy, and climate change, (6) agriculture, (7) education, (8) health, (9) science and technology, and (10) development.

In November 2010, Obama became the second US president (after Richard Nixon in 1969) to undertake a visit to India in his first term in office. On 8 November, Obama also became the second US president (after Dwight D. Eisenhower in 1959) to ever address a joint session of the Parliament of India. In a major policy shift, Obama declared US support for India's permanent membership on the UN Security Council. Calling the India–U.S. relationship "a defining partnership of the 21st century", he also announced the removal of export control restrictions on several Indian companies, and concluded trade deals worth $10 billion, which are expected to create and/or support 50,000 jobs in the US.

==== Devyani Khobragade incident ====
In December 2013, Devyani Khobragade, the Deputy Consul General of India in New York, was arrested and accused by U.S. federal prosecutors of submitting false work visa documents and paying her housekeeper "far less than the minimum legal wage." The ensuing incident caused protests from the Indian government and a rift in relations, with outrage expressed that Khobragade was strip-searched and held in the general inmate population. Former Prime Minister Manmohan Singh said that Khobragade's treatment was "deplorable".

India demanded an apology from the U.S. over her alleged "humiliation" and called for the charges to be dropped, which the U.S. declined to do. The Indian government retaliated for what it viewed as the mistreatment of its consular official by revoking the ID cards and other privileges of U.S. consular personnel and their families in India and removing security barriers in front of the U.S. Embassy in New Delhi.

The Indian government also blocked non-diplomats from using the American Community Support Association (ACSA) club and American Embassy Club in New Delhi, ordering these social clubs to cease all commercial activities benefiting non-diplomatic personnel by 16 January 2014. The ACSA club operates a bar, bowling alley, swimming pool, restaurant, video rentals club, indoor gym and a beauty parlour within the embassy premises. Tax-free import clearances given to US diplomats and consular officials for importing food, alcohol and other domestic items were revoked with immediate effect. U.S. embassy vehicles and staff were no longer immune from penalties for traffic violations. American diplomats were asked to show work contracts for all domestic help (cooks, gardeners, drivers and security staff) employed within their households. Indian authorities also conducted an investigation into the American Embassy School.

Nancy J. Powell, the U.S. ambassador to India, resigned following the incident, which was widely seen by India "as fallout from the imbroglio." Some commentators suggested that the incident and response could lead to wider damage in U.S.–India relations. Former Finance Minister Yashwant Sinha called for the arrest of same-sex companions of US diplomats, citing the Supreme Court of India's upholding of Section 377 of the Indian Penal Code whereby homosexuality is illegal in India. Former State Department legal advisor John Bellinger questioned whether the decision to arrest and detain Khobragade was "wise policy ... even if technically permissible" under the Vienna Convention on Consular Relations, while Robert D. Blackwill, the former U.S. ambassador to India from 2001 to 2003, said the incident was "stupid." Nevertheless, within a year of the incident, U.S.-India relations were warming again, as U.S. President Obama visited India in January 2015.

==== Relationship between US Government and Narendra Modi (2001–2014) ====
Sectarian violence during the 2002 Gujarat riots damaged relations between the US Government and Narendra Modi, then incumbent chief minister of Gujarat. Human rights activists accused Modi of fostering anti-Muslim violence and persistently violating human rights agreements. New York based non-governmental organization Human Rights Watch, in their 2002 report directly implicated Gujarat state officials in the violence against Muslims. In 2005, the US Department of State used a 1998 International Religious Freedom Act (IRFA) provision to revoke Modi's tourist/business visa citing section 212 (a) (2) (g) of the US Immigration and Nationality Act. The IRFA provision "makes any foreign government official who 'was responsible for or directly carried out, at any time, particularly severe violations of religious freedom' ineligible for a visa to the United States". In 2012, a Special Investigation Team (SIT) appointed by the Indian Supreme Court found no "prosecutable evidence" against Modi. The Court absolved Modi of any criminal wrongdoing during the riots.

Prior to Narendra Modi becoming the Prime Minister of India, the US Government had made it known that Modi as Chief Minister of Gujarat would not be permitted to travel to the US. Michael Kugelman of the Wilson Center opined that although technically speaking there was no US 'visa ban' from 2005 to 2014, the US government policy of considering Modi as persona non grata had resulted in a de facto travel-ban. After the US revoked his existing B1/B2 visa in 2005 and refused to accept his application for an A2 visa, the US State Department affirmed that the visa policy remained unchanged : "(Mr Modi) is welcome to apply for a visa and await a review like any other applicant". Exploring opportunities on how to move the relationship out of a state of morose, Lisa Curtis, senior research fellow for South Asia in the Asian Studies Center of The Heritage Foundation, says that, "the U.S. must first signal its willingness and commitment to collaborating with the new government—and that it will not dwell on the controversy of the 2002 Gujarat riots, which led the U.S. to revoke Modi's visa in 2005." In 2009, the U.S. Commission for International Religious Freedom (USCIRF) report after ignoring the views and decision of independent body (SIT) set up by India's highest judiciary vehemently alleged that there was "significant evidence" linking Narendra Modi to communal riots in the state in 2002 and asked the Obama administration to continue the policy of preventing him from travelling to the United States of America .

The Obama administration maintained the 2005 decision taken by the George W. Bush administration to deny Narendra Modi entry into the United States of America. The US Government says that Modi can circumvent the USCIRF sanctions regime by visiting Washington on a Heads of government A1-visa as long as he is the Prime Minister of India. According to US State Department Spokesperson, Jen Psaki : "US law exempts foreign government officials, including heads of state and heads of government from certain potential inadmissibility grounds". The visa refusal came after some Indian-American groups and human rights organizations with political view campaigned against Modi, including the Coalition Against Genocide.

On June 11, 2014, Robert Blackwill, the former Coordinator for Strategic Planning and Deputy US National Security Advisor during the presidency of George W. Bush, spoke at length about India–U.S. relations and said : "Mr Modi is a determined leader. He is candid and frank. I also worked with him during the Gujarat earthquake when I was posted as (the US) ambassador to India. ... It was mistake by the current Obama administration to delay engagement with Mr Modi. I do not know why they did so but definitely, this did not help in building relationship. ... The old formula and stereotypes will not work if the US administration wants to engage with Mr Modi. The Indian prime minister is candid, direct and smart. He speaks his mind. The US administration also has to engage in candid conversation when Mr Modi meets President Obama later this year. They have to do something innovative to engage with him." Nicholas Burns, former U.S. Undersecretary of State for Political Affairs from 2005 to 2008, has spoken about the visa denial by saying: "Bush administration officials, including me, believed this to be the right decision at the time." and has opined that "Now that it looks like Modi will become prime minister, it's reasonable for the Obama administration to say it's been 12 years [since the 2002 riots], and we'll be happy to deal with him"

=== NDA government (2014–present) ===
==== Modi–Obama relationship (2014–2017) ====
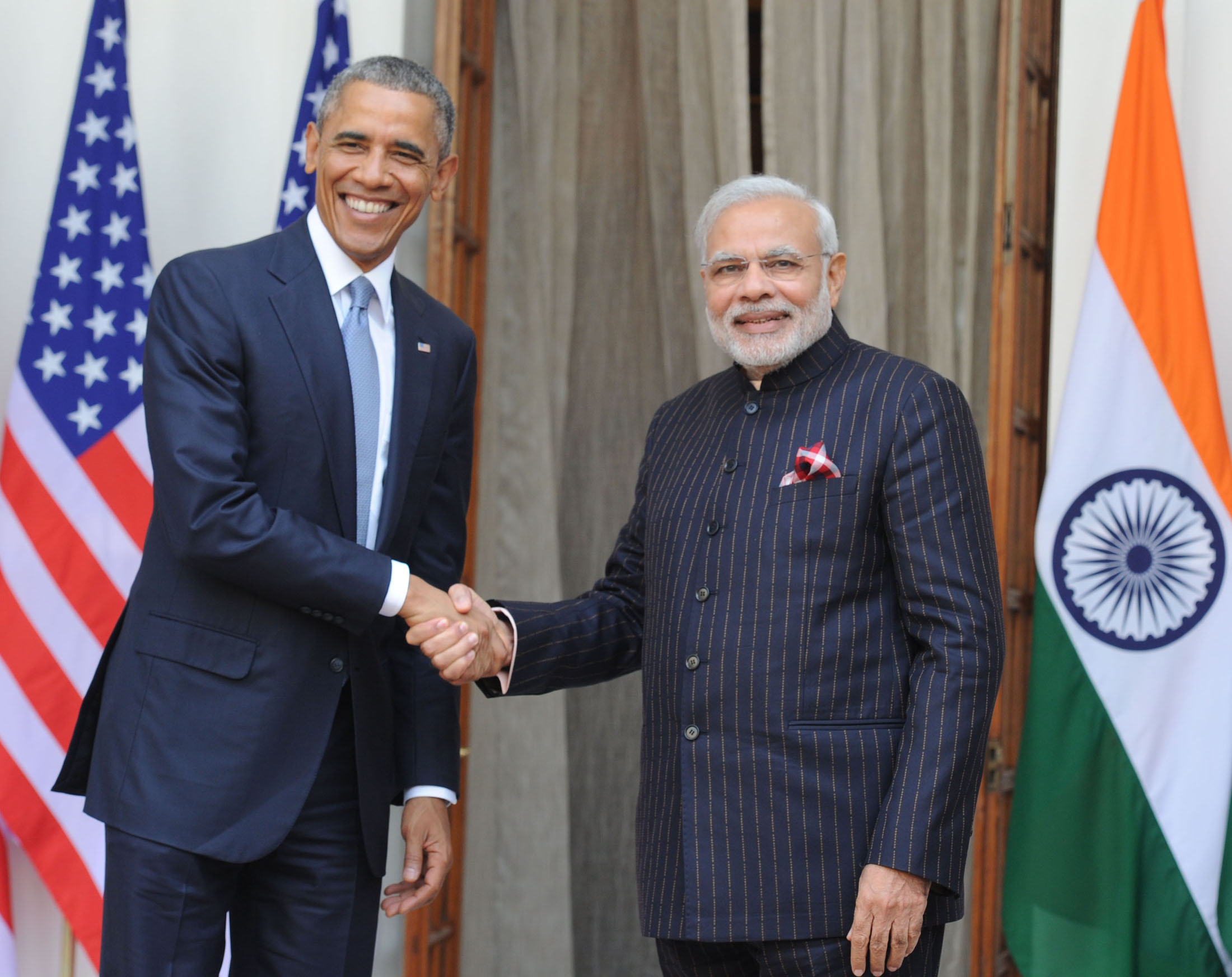
Indian Prime Minister Narendra Modi with U.S. President Barack Obama in New Delhi, January 2015.

India–United States relations have improved significantly during the Premiership of Narendra Modi since 2014. At present, India and the US share an extensive and expanding cultural, strategic, military, and economic relationship which is in the phase of implementing confidence building measures (CBM) to overcome the legacy of trust deficit – brought about by adversarial US foreign policies and multiple instances of technology denial – which have plagued the relationship over several decades.

Key recent developments include the rapid growth of India's economy, closer ties between the Indian and American industries especially in the Information and communications technology (ICT), engineering and medical sectors, an informal entente to manage an increasingly assertive China, robust cooperation on counter-terrorism, the deterioration of U.S.-Pakistan relations, easing of export controls over dual-use goods & technologies (99% of licenses applied for are now approved), and reversal of long-standing American opposition to India's strategic program.

Income creation in the USA through knowledge-based employment by Asian Indians has outpaced every other ethnic group according to U.S. Census data. Growing financial and political clout of the affluent Asian Indian diaspora is noteworthy. Indian American households are the most prosperous in the US with a median revenue of US$100,000 and are followed by Chinese Americans at US$65,000. The average household revenue in the USA is US$63,000.

The 2014 State Department's annual Trafficking in Persons (TIP) report appeared to classify the Khobragade incident as an example of human trafficking, stating: "An Indian consular officer at the New York consulate was indicted in December 2013 for visa fraud related to her alleged exploitation of an Indian domestic worker." In response, India has shown no urgency to allow visits to India by the newly appointed US anti-human trafficking ambassador Susan P. Coppedge and the US special envoy for LGBT rights Randy Berry. Under Section 377 of the Indian Penal Code homosexuality was illegal in India. Indian Ambassador to the US, Arun K. Singh reiterated India's commitment to work within an international framework to tackle the problem of trafficking but rejected any "unilateral assessments" by another country saying "We will never accept it" and downplayed the importance of the visits: "When you ask a U.S. official when somebody will be given a visa, they always say 'we will assess when visa is applied for.' ... I can do no better than to reiterate the U.S. position."

In February 2016, the Obama administration notified the US Congress that it intended to provide Pakistan eight nuclear-capable F-16 fighters and assorted military goods including eight AN/APG-68(V)9 airborne radars and eight ALQ-211(V)9 electronic warfare suites despite strong reservations from US lawmakers regarding the transfer of any nuclear weapons capable platforms to Pakistan. Shashi Tharoor, an elected representative from the Congress party in India, questioned the substance of India–U.S. ties: "I am very disappointed to hear this news. The truth is that continuing to escalate the quality of arms available to an irresponsible regime that has sent terrorists to India, and in the name of anti-terrorism, is cynicism of the highest order". The Indian Government summoned the US Ambassador to India to convey its disapproval regarding the sale of F-16 fighter jets to Pakistan.

==== Modi–Trump relationship (2017–2021) ====
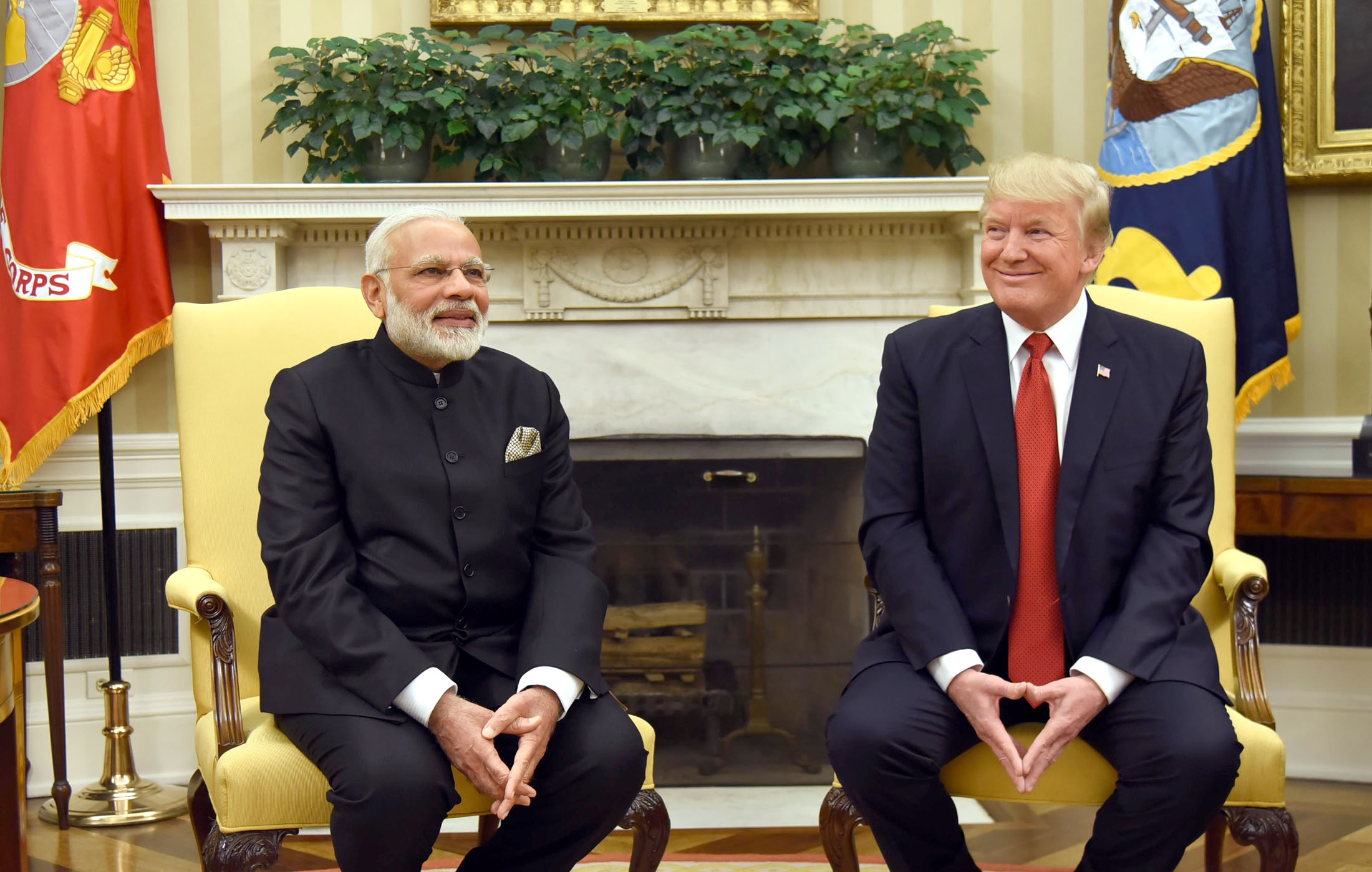
Indian Prime Minister Narendra Modi with U.S. President Donald Trump in the Oval Office, June 2017

In February 2017, Indian ambassador to the U.S. Navtej Sarna hosted a reception for the National Governors Association (NGA), which was attended by the Governors of 25 states and senior representatives of 3 more states. This was the first time such an event has occurred. Explaining the reason for the gathering, Virginia Governor and NGA Chair Terry McAuliffe stated that "India is America's greatest strategic partner". He further added, "We clearly understand the strategic importance of India, of India–U.S. relations. As we grow our 21st century economy, India has been so instrumental in helping us build our technology, medical professions. We recognise a country that has been such a close strategic ally of the US. That's why we the Governors are here tonight." McAuliffe, who has visited India 15 times, also urged other Governors to visit the country with trade delegations to take advantage of opportunities.

In October 2018, India inked the historic agreement worth US$5.43 billion with Russia to procure four S-400 Triumf surface-to-air missile defence system, one of the most powerful missile defence systems in the world ignoring America's CAATSA act. The U.S. threatened India with sanctions over India's decision to buy the S-400 missile defense system from Russia. The United States also threatened India with sanctions over India's decision to buy oil from Iran. According to the President of the U.S.-India Strategic Partnership Forum (USISPF), Mukesh Aghi: "sanctions would have a disastrous effect on U.S.-India relations for decades to come. In India's eyes, the United States would once again be regarded as untrustworthy." The Trump administration avoided sanctioning India for the Russian S-400 missile system, but sanctioned Turkey and China for the same purchases.

President Trump has grown closer to India's BJP government, which shares the similar right-wing views, he has repeatedly praised Modi's leadership and avoided any negative criticism of the Indian government's actions on the citizenship and Kashmir disputes. The Trump administration is consistent with the Modi administration in combating "radical Islamic terrorism", and the US reiterates its support for India's elimination of terrorist training camp in Pakistan.

In early 2020, India provided its agreement for terminating an export embargo on a medicinal drug known as hydroxychloroquine amidst the combat against the ongoing coronavirus (COVID-19) pandemic, after Trump threatened retaliation against India, if it did not comply with terminating the export embargo on hydroxychloroquine. In June 2020, during the George Floyd protests, the Mahatma Gandhi Memorial in Washington, D.C., was vandalised by unknown miscreants on the intervening night of June 2 and 3. The incident prompted the Indian Embassy to register a complaint with law enforcement agencies. Taranjit Singh Sandhu, the Indian Ambassador to the United States called the vandalism "a crime against humanity". U.S. President Donald Trump called the defacement of Mahatma Gandhi's statue a "disgrace".

On 21 December 2020, President of the United States Donald Trump awarded Modi with the Legion of Merit for elevating India–United States relations. The Legion of Merit was awarded to Modi along with Prime Minister of Australia Scott Morrison and former Prime Minister of Japan Shinzo Abe, the "original architects" of the QUAD.

==== Modi–Biden relationship (2021–2025) ====
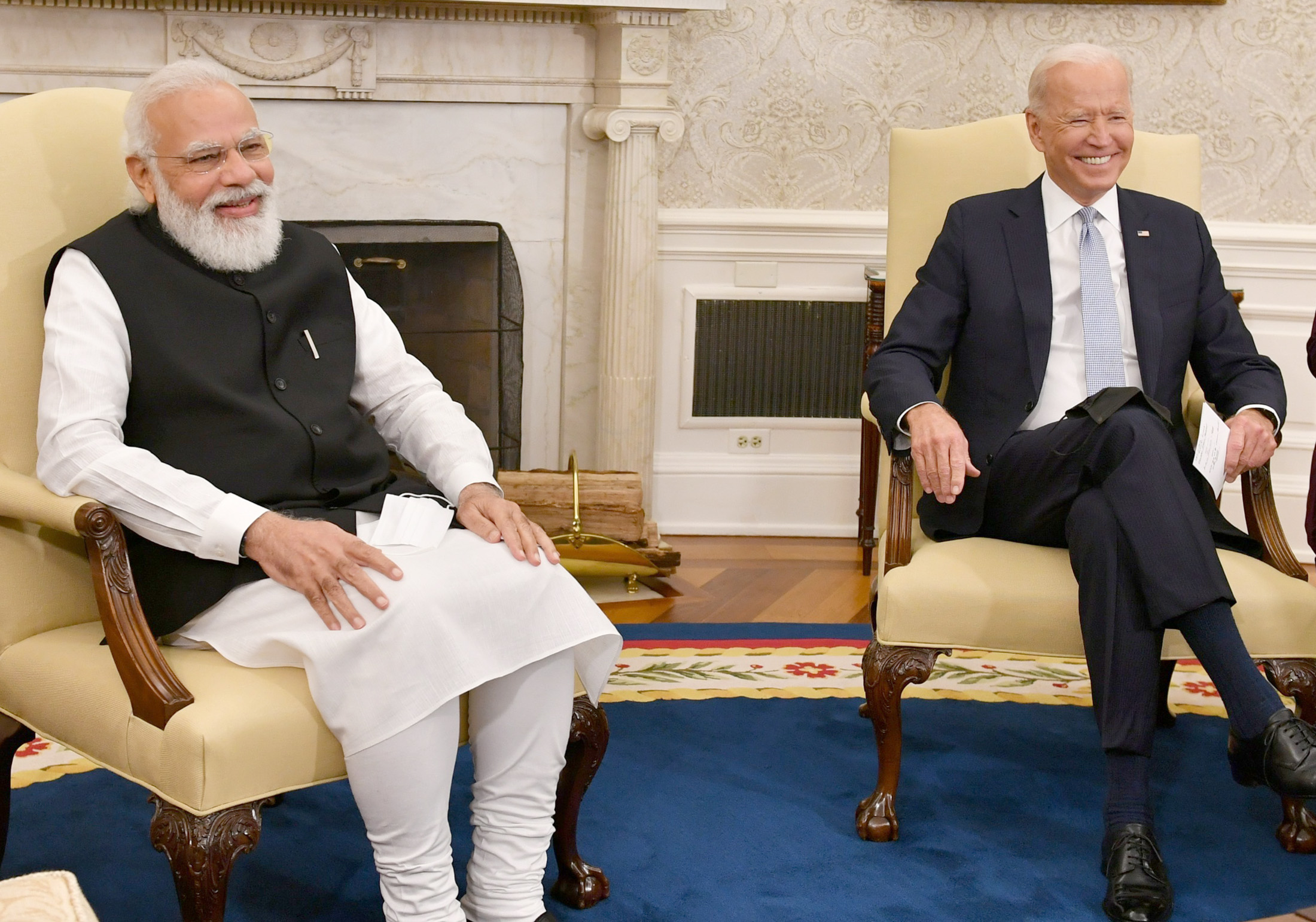
Indian Prime Minister Narendra Modi with U.S. President Joe Biden in the Oval Office, September 2021

US-India ties began to strain in April 2021 when India faced a massive spike in COVID-19 infections. The US had invoked the Defense Production Act of 1950 to ban the export of raw materials needed to produce vaccines in order to prioritize domestic vaccine production. According to The Times of India, this also caused an explosion of anti-US sentiment in India, as the U.S. had vaccine reserves and refused to share COVID-19 vaccine patents. This came after a plea by Adar Poonawalla, CEO of the Serum Institute of India, to lift the embargo on export of raw materials needed to ramp up production of COVID-19 vaccines, was rejected. However, in late April, right after a phone call with Ajit Doval, the National Security Advisor of India, the Biden administration stated it would make raw materials necessary for production of the Oxford–AstraZeneca COVID-19 vaccine available to India, and began to send more than ₹714 crore (equivalent to ₹874 crore or US$93 million in 2026) worth of drug treatments, rapid diagnostic tests, ventilators, personal protective equipment, and mechanical parts needed to manufacture vaccines to India, along with a team of public health experts from the United States Centers for Disease Control and Prevention. The US also stated that it planned to finance the expansion of Biological E. Limited, an Indian-based COVID-19 vaccine production company. India entered negotiations with the US after it declared that it would share 60 million Oxford-AstraZeneca vaccines with the world.

In a meeting of the Quadrilateral Security Dialogue on the implications of the 2022 Russian invasion of Ukraine for the region, President Biden noted India's abstention, saying that most global allies were united against Russia. Speaking to the US Senate Foreign Relations Committee, US diplomat Donald Lu said the Biden administration was still considering sanctions against India over its S-400 deal with Russia, and its abstention at the UN. However, the Biden administration has ruled out secondary sanctions against India for its considerable oil imports or defence engagement from Russia.

==== USS John Paul Jones intrusion ====
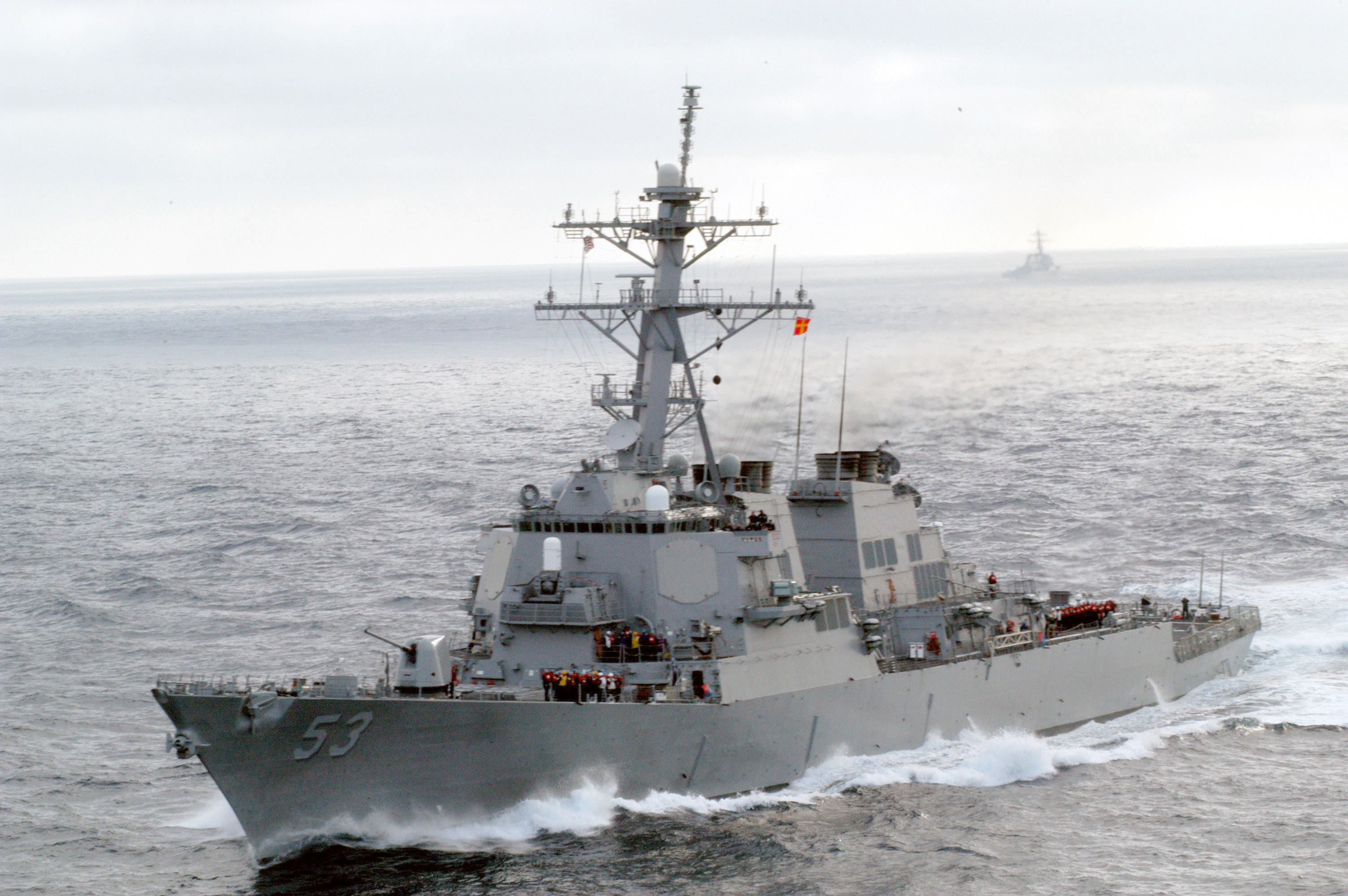
The USS John Paul Jones off the coast of California in November 2002

On April 7, 2021, The United States Navy guided missile destroyer USS John Paul Jones sailed through India's Exclusive Economic Zone, without New Delhi's prior consent, then publicly announced the event, causing a diplomatic spat. At a time when the United States and India had been deepening relations, such a move had raised eyebrows among the general public in both India and the United States. As per the official statement by the United States Navy's 7th Fleet, "On April 7, 2021 (local time) USS John Paul Jones (DDG 53) asserted navigational rights and freedoms approximately 130 nautical miles west of the Lakshadweep Islands, inside India's exclusive economic zone, without requesting India's prior consent, consistent with international law". India requires prior consent for military exercises or maneuvers in its exclusive economic zone or continental shelf, a claim inconsistent with international law. This freedom of navigation operation ("FONOP") upheld the rights, freedoms, and lawful uses of the sea recognized in international law by challenging India's excessive maritime claims. The Statement further added, "U.S. Forces operate in the Indo-Pacific region on a daily basis. All operations are designed in accordance with international law and demonstrate that the United States will fly, sail and operate wherever international law allows." The Pentagon defended the 7th Fleet's statement by claiming that the event was consistent with international law.

The Indian Ministry of External Affairs released its statement after much media attention, the statement said, "The Government of India's stated position on the United Nations Convention on the Law of the Sea is that the Convention does not authorize other States to carry out in the Exclusive Economic Zone and on the continental shelf, military exercises or maneuvers, in particular those involving the use of weapons or explosives, without the consent of the coastal state", it further added, "The USS John Paul Jones was continuously monitored transiting from the Persian Gulf towards the Malacca Straits. We have conveyed our concerns regarding this passage through our EEZ to the Government of USA through diplomatic channels." Former Chief of Naval Staff of the Indian Navy, Admiral Arun Prakash, commented on the event by tweeting "There is irony here. While India ratified [the] UN Law of the Seas in 1995, the US has failed to do it so far. For the 7th Fleet to carry out FoN missions in Indian EEZ in violation of our domestic law is bad enough. But publicizing it? USN please switch on IFF!". He further tweeted, "FoN ops by USN ships (ineffective as they may be) in South China Sea, are meant to convey a message to China that the putative EEZ around the artificial SCS islands is an 'excessive maritime claim.' But what is the 7th Fleet message for India?"

==== Strengthen cooperation in various fields ====
Although there are certain differences over the Russian invasion of Ukraine, the United States and India have strengthened cooperation in defense, semiconductors, critical minerals, space, climate, education, healthcare and other fields during the Joe Biden presidency. Biden also called the ties with India is "one of the defining relationships of the 21st Century". Modi and Biden reiterated the call for concerted action against all groups identified by the United Nations as terrorist organisations, including Al-Qaeda, ISIS (Daesh), Lashkar-e-Tayyiba (LeT), Jaish-e-Mohammad (JeM) and Hizb-ul-Mujhahideen (HuM). Also mentioned the Afghan Taliban authorities and Pakistan should to stop terrorism. The joint statement declared that two countries have strong ties spanning "seas to stars".

==== Spying allegations against India ====
In November 2023, it has been reported that US authorities prevented a plot to assassinate Gurpatwant Singh Pannun, a Sikh separatist leader of the Khalistan movement, within American borders. Pannun has made threats to bomb the Indian Parliament and Air India flights, is now facing charges related to terrorist activities by India's NIA. United States federal prosecutors have filed charges against Nikhil Gupta, an Indian national, alleging his involvement in a conspiracy with an Indian government official to carry out the assassination of Pannun. India has voiced apprehension over the connection of one of its government officials to the plot, distancing itself from the incident as it contradicts government policy.

==== Modi–Trump relationship (2025–present) ====
On July 30, 2025, US President Donald Trump announced that Indian products would be subject to 25% tariffs upon arrival in the United States starting August 1, and that a "penalty" would be added for the purchase of Russian oil.

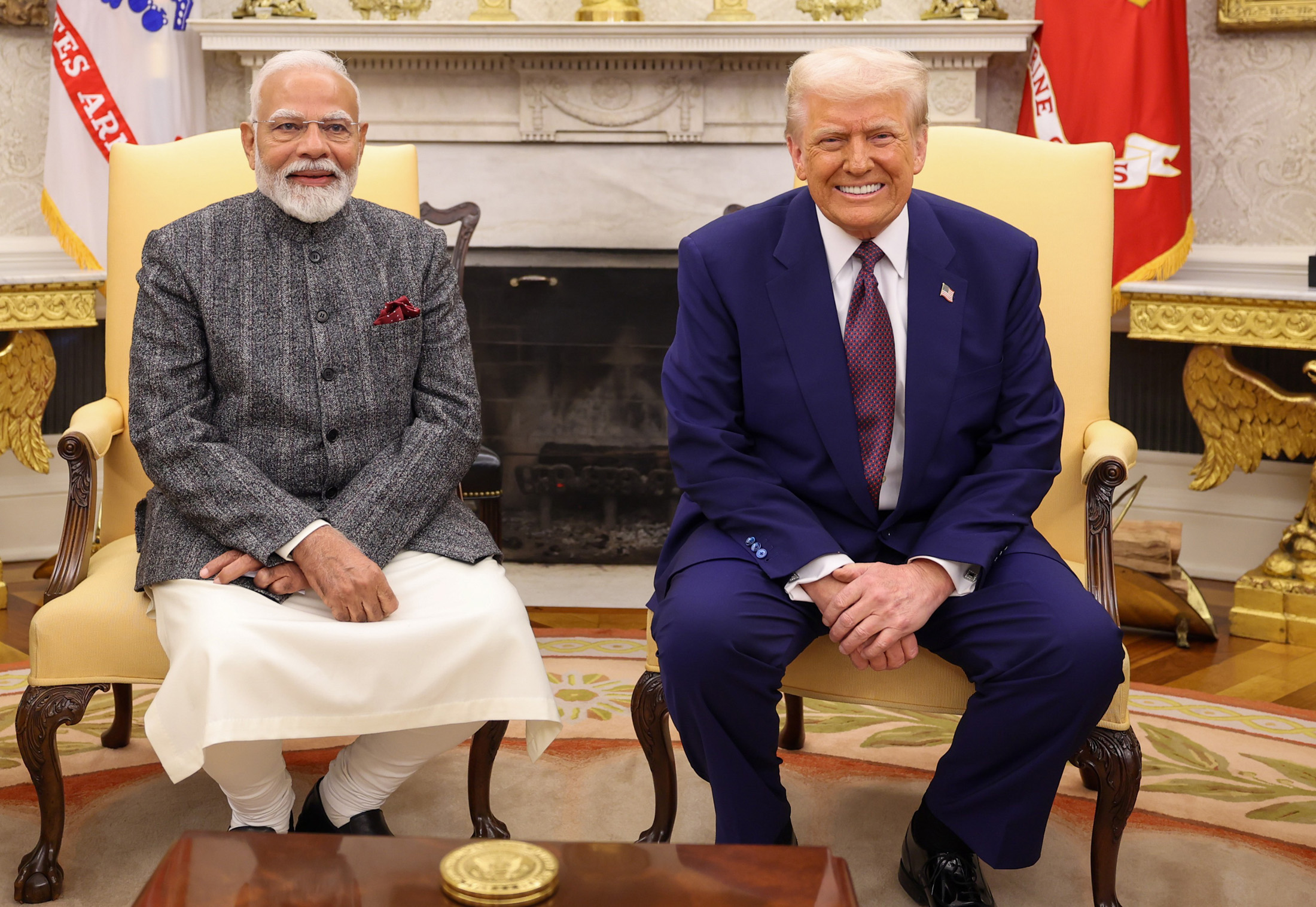
Indian Prime Minister Narendra Modi with U.S. President Donald Trump in the Oval Office, February 2025

== Triangular relations ==
=== Africa ===
India and the United States have held two "India-US Dialogue on Africa" sessions as of 2024.

=== Asia ===
==== East Asia ====
===== China =====
Indian concerns over the threat of China led to collaboration with the United States in the first two Cold War decades. However, American support for Pakistan in the Indo-Pakistani war of 1971 and the 1972 visit by Richard Nixon to China marked a turning point in the triangular relationship toward stronger China–United States relations, so India pivoted to the Soviet Union for military support.

In the 21st century, India-United States cooperation has aimed to contain China in Asia and the broader Indo-Pacific.

==== South Asia ====
===== Bangladesh =====
American ties with Bangladesh were strained during Sheikh Hasina's rule, due to American accusations of human rights violations; India discouraged the United States from pressing too hard on these accusations to avoid giving ground to Islamist parties in future Bangladeshi elections. However, under Bangladesh's Yunus ministry, Bangladesh-US relations have improved, though Bangladesh's ties with India have worsened.

===== Pakistan =====
During the Cold War and the War in Afghanistan, the US relied on Pakistan to intervene in Afghanistan, and the US military aid to Pakistan at this time caused India's dissatisfaction.

In 2009, Robert Blake, Assistant Secretary of State for South and Central Asian Affairs, dismissed any concerns over a rift with India regarding American Af-Pak policy. Calling India and the United States "natural allies", Blake said that the United States cannot afford to meet the strategic priorities in Pakistan and Afghanistan at "the expense of India".

From the mid-2000s to 2025, India halved its arms imports from Russia, and has pivoted to buying more from the United States and France. At the same time, Pakistan has doubled its arm imports from China, resulting in a realignment of ties.

=== European and Western countries ===
==== Canada ====
Both Canada and the United States allege that the Indian government ordered assassinations on Sikh separatists who were their citizens. Regarding the 2023 Canada–India diplomatic row on this matter, State Department spokesman Matthew Miller said in October 2024 that "We wanted to see the government of India cooperate with Canada in its investigation. Obviously, they have not; they have chosen an alternate path."

==== United Kingdom ====
Serious tension erupted over American demands that India be given independence, a proposition Churchill vehemently rejected. For years Roosevelt had encouraged Britain's disengagement from India. The American position was based on principled opposition to colonialism, practical concern for the outcome of the war, and the expectation of a large American role in a post-colonial era. In 1942 when the Congress Party launched a Quit India movement, the colonial authorities arrested tens of thousands of activists (including Mahatma Gandhi). Meanwhile, India became the main American staging base for aid to China. Churchill threatened to resign if Roosevelt continued to push his demands, and Roosevelt backed down. Churchill was a believer in the integrity of the British Empire, but he was voted out of office in the summer of 1945. Attlee's new Labour government was much more favorable toward Indian aspirations. The process of de-colonization was highlighted by the independence Britain granted to India, Pakistan and Ceylon (now Sri Lanka) in 1947. The United States approved, but provided no financial or diplomatic support.

==== Ukraine ====
During the Biden administration and the start of the Russian invasion of Ukraine, there were initially significant tensions regarding India's ties with Russia. However, the second Trump administration is anticipated to seek a quick end to the conflict, likely reducing India's distance from the United States on European security issues.
