= Robert Hume =

Robert Hume may refer to:

- Robert Deniston Hume (1845–1908), politician, author and businessman
- Robert H. Hume (1922–1999), American runner
- Rob Hume, ornithologist
- Robert Ernest Hume (1877–1948), Indian-born American author, professor, missionary and minister
