= Dorothy Clarke Wilson =

American dramatist (1904–2003)

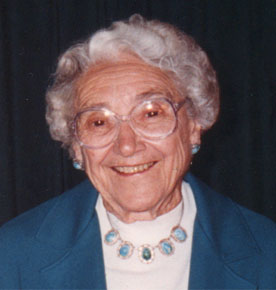
- Born: May 9, 1904; Gardiner, Maine, U.S.
- Died: March 26, 2003 (aged 98); Orono, Maine, U.S.
- Occupation: Writer
- Spouse: Elwin L. Wilson (m. 1925; died 1992)

Dorothy Clarke Wilson (May 9, 1904 – March 26, 2003) was an American writer, perhaps best known for her novel Prince of Egypt (1949), which was a primary source for the Cecil B. DeMille film, The Ten Commandments (1956).

== Early life ==
Dorothy Wight Clarke was born on May 9, 1904, in Gardiner, Maine, to Lewis Herbert Clarke, a Baptist minister, and his wife Flora Eva (Cross) Clarke. She attended Cony High School in Augusta, graduating at seventeen as valedictorian of her class. In 1925 she graduated Phi Beta Kappa from Bates College in Lewiston, and on August 31 of that year married fellow Bates student Elwin Leander Wilson (c. 1899–1992). Elwin went on to study at Princeton Theological Seminary and the Boston University School of Theology. Upon completion of his studies, he and Dorothy returned to Maine, settling in Westbrook.

== Career ==
Clarke's first play that she sold was written for a church. Her best known book was Prince of Egypt, which won the Westminster prize for the best religious book the year it was published and was also one of the sources for the film The Ten Commandments. Clarke was not a fan of the movie and used the term 'flimflammery' to describe the scene in which Moses parted the Red Sea. Wilson is also well known for her biographies about women such as Dorothea Dix and Elizabeth Blackwell as well as the presidential wives Dolley Madison and Martha Washington.

The Wilson Center at the University of Maine was named in Dorothy and Elwin's honor. Dorothy Wilson received numerous awards through her lifetime before she died in 2003.

== Personal life ==
Wilson and her husband adopted two children: a daughter, Joan (1930–2003), and a son, Harold (1930–1977). They were married until Elwin's death on March 31, 1992. Dorothy Clarke Wilson herself died on March 26, 2003, in Orono, Maine, at the age of 98.

== Selected works ==
In addition to her many plays, essays, and lectures, Wilson's work includes:

- Twelve Months of Drama for the Average Church (1933; plays and worship services)
- The Herdsman (1946; novel about Amos)
- Prince of Egypt (1949; novel about Moses)
- House of Earth (1952, a novel about India)
- Fly with Me to India (1954; a travel book)
- That Heaven of Freedom: A One-Act Play of India (1954)
- Jezebel (1955)
- The Gifts: The Story of the Boyhood of Jesus (1957, fiction)
- Dr. Ida: The Story of Dr. Ida Scudder of Vellore [India] (1959)
- The Journey (1962)
- Take My Hands: The Remarkable Story of Dr. Mary Verghese (1963)
- The Tree Gifts (1963)
- Ten Fingers for God (1966/1983; about Paul Brand, a missionary to lepers in India)
- Handicap Race: The Inspiring Story of Roger Arnett (1967)
- Palace of Healing: The Story of Dr. Clara Swain, first woman missionary doctor, and the hospital she founded (1968)
- Lone Woman: The Story of Elizabeth Blackwell, the first woman doctor (1970; published in 1983 as I Will Be a Doctor! The Story of America's First Physician)
- The Big-Little World of Doc Pritham, a Greenville doctor (1971; only book set in Maine; reissued for fifth time in 1999)
- Hilary: the brave world of Hilary Pole (1972)
- Bright Eyes: The Story of Susette La Flesche, an Omaha Indian (1974)
- Stranger & Traveler: The Story of Dorothea Dix, American Reformer (1975)
- Granny Brand: Her Story (1976; a.k.a. Climb Every Mountain: The Story of Granny Brand)
- Twelve Who Cared: My Aventures with Christian Courage (1977)
- Apostle of Sight (1980: about Victor C. Rambo, an ophthalmologist who served in India for over half a century)
- Lincoln's Mothers (1981)
- Lady Washington (1984, about Martha Washington)
- The Brother (1984, a novel about St. James)
- Queen Dolley: The Life and Times of Dolley Madison (1987)
- Alice and Edith: The Two Wives of Teddy Roosevelt (1989)
- Leaves in the Wind: A Lifetime in Verse (1995)
- Live for Hundred Years: A History of the Maine Christian Association (1996)
- Union in Diversity (1999, 2nd ed., memoirs)
