= The Responaut =

Magazine for people using respirators, 1963–89

The Responaut was a quarterly magazine that was "by, for and about respirator-aided and other gadget-aided people". It was first published in December 1963 and ran until 1989.

It was conceived and edited by Ann Armstrong, who was herself a respirator user since she contracted respiratory polio in 1955. The word responaut is used for people who "require regular mechanical respiratory assistance".

The magazine regularly featured many progressive disabled people of the time including Megan Du Boisson (founder of the Disabled Income Group), and Paul Hunt, one of the founders of the Union of the Physically Impaired Against Segregation.

There are also articles from noted people of the era, including Stirling Moss, Canon W R Birt, Robin Cavendish, Raymond Baxter, Lord Snowdon, Lord Willis, Alfred Morris (MP), Lord Aberdare and many more.

The magazine featured contributions from disabled individuals worldwide, forming an interactive network prior to the widespread use of the Internet. Hilary Pole became editor after spending ten years hospitalized; having only 2 mm of movement in her left big toe, she typed using a POSSUM system.
