= Hilary Pole =

English person with myasthenia gravis (1938–1975)

Hilary Pole in school in 1956

Hilary Jennifer Pole MBE (1938–1975) was an English writer and campaigner who had myasthenia gravis and was an early user of a POSSUM communication device. She was said to be "the most seriously handicapped person alive", as for many years her movement was limited to 2mm movement in her left big toe.

Pole was born in Yorkshire to Eric and Mona Pole, and had a younger brother and sister. She grew up in the West Midlands and attended King Edward VI Handsworth School and King Edward VI High School for Girls, where she played sports enthusiastically and passed A levels in botany, zoology and art. She studied at I.M. Marsh College of Physical Education, and enjoyed her first teaching placement in a school. But in the last term of her course she began to be unwell, tiring easily, which was initially attributed to stress. Eventually she was diagnosed with myasthenia gravis, which damages the nerve system. Within a few years she had lost her sight, could not speak or breathe unaided, and could only move one toe to the extent of 2mm. She required injections every few hours to preserve that level of movement. She spent ten years in hospital, but returned to a specially-adapted flat in her parents' home in 1970, with 24-hour care from a rota of nurses and volunteers. While in hospital she communicated by ringing a bell with her toe, and counting out letters by the number of rings: with this technique she wrote poetry, and replied to letters, as well as requesting care. She later used a POSSUM (Patient Operated Selector Mechanism) and for the first time for many years could communicate independently: she wrote to her old school saying "I can have speedier, more lucid conversations; write my poems and letters in private; to quote one of my friends, I can now be risqué without the whole hospital knowing!" She became editor of The Responaut, and worked to raise funds to provide POSSUMs for others who needed them.

She was appointed MBE in the 1973 Birthday Honours "for services to disabled people".

In 1972, Dorothy Clarke Wilson published Hilary: the brave world of Hilary Pole (Hodder & Stoughton ISBN 978-0-340-16435-8)

Pole died on 18 June 1975, at her home in Walsall.
