= Hervey De Witt Griswold =

- Born: May 24, 1860; Dryden, New York, USA
- Died: May 11, 1945 (aged 84)
- Children: 3

Hervey De Witt Griswold (May 24, 1860 — May 11, 1945) was an American writer and missionary.

== Early life and education ==
Griswold was born on May 24, 1860, in Dryden, New York, to Benjamin and Laura Eliza (Hurd) Griswold. He attended Union College in Schenectady, New York, from 1881 to 1885 then went to Union Theological Seminary in New York City from 1885 to 1888. During the following two years Griswold had a fellowship at Oxford and Berlin Universities.

== Career ==
Griswold began his 36-year-long career as a missionary in 1890 in Jhansi, India as a representative of the Board of Foreign Missions of the Presbyterian Church. In 1894 Griswold became Professor of Philosophy at Forman Christian College in Lahore, India (now Pakistan), teaching English and history there as well. As its librarian Griswold built the Foreman Christian College Library, adding a substantial number of books on religion and philosophy to the collection. Griswold also served as secretary of the India Council of the Presbyterian Missions. In 1900 Griswold received his Ph.D. from Cornell University, based on his thesis on the Indian Philosophy known as Brahman. In 1910, Griswold obtained his Doctor of Divinity. A prolific writer, he wrote about Hinduism and other Indian religions. He also wrote about the Founder of the Ahmadiyya Movement, Mirza Ghulam Ahmad, at a time when Ahmad was alive, and critically analyzed his claims to be the promised Messiah and Mahdi.

In 1890 Griswold married Frances S. Sheldon. Together they had three children: Laura Katharine; Arthur Sheldon; and Frances Louise. Griswold retired from his missionary work in 1926 and died on May 11, 1945.

== Selected publications ==
- Griswold, H.D. & Dayanada Sarasvati, S. (1892). The problem of the Arya Samaj.
- Griswold, H.D. (1897). The Dayanandi interpretation of the word "deva" in the Rig Veda. Lodiana Mission Press.
- Griswold, H.D. (1900). Brahman: A study in the history of Indian philosophy. Macmillan Publishers.
- Griswold, H.D. & Dayanada Sarasvati, S. (1901). The problem of the Arya Samaj (2nd ed.).
- Griswold, H.D. (1902). Mirza Ghulám Ahmad : the Mehdí Messiah of Qádián. American Tract Society.
- Griswold, H.D. (1904). The Chet Rami Sect. Christ Church Mission Press. http://www.worldcat.org/oclc/689375513
- Griswold, H.D. (1905). Messiah of Qádián: Being a paper read before the Victoria Institute. Harrison and Sons.
- Griswold, H.D. (1906). The Radha Swami sect: Paper read at the Mussoorie Conference, 1906. Christ Church Mission Press. http://www.worldcat.org/oclc/689377760
- Griswold, H.D. (1912). Catechism on Christian giving.
- Griswold, H.D. (1915). Methods of teaching village Christians to read. Christian Literature Society for India
- Griswold, H.D. (1917). Village evangelization (no. 2): being papers read at the 17th annual meeting of the North India conference of Christian workers, held in Mussoorie, June 19-22, 1917. North India Conference of Christian Workers. http://www.worldcat.org/oclc/690990530
- Griswold, H.D. (1919). India, after the war, in India. Columbia University Libraries.
- Farquhar, J.N. & Griswold, H.D. (Eds.). (1923). The religion of the Rigveda: The religious quest of India. Humphrey Milford Oxford University Press.
- Griswold, H.D. & Griswold Space, M. (Eds.). (1930). The ancestors and descendants of Edward Griswold of Dryden, New York.
- Griswold, H.D. (1934). Insights into modern Hinduism. Henry Holt and Company.
- Griswold, H.D. & Wooddell, F.G. (1938-1940). Autobiographical notes, prepared for his descendants. Columbia University Libraries.
- Griswold, H.D. (1971). The religion of the Rigveda. Oxford University Press.
- Griswold, H.D. (2000). The ancestors and descendants of Edward Griswold of New York.
- Griswold, H.D. (2009). The god Varuna in the Rig Veda. Bulletin (Society of Comparative Theology and Philosophy).
