= Victor Clough Rambo =

American ophthalmologist and missionary (1894 - 1987)

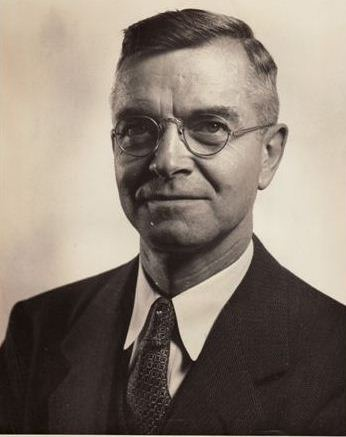
- Victor Clough Rambo
- Born: 1894; Landour, North-Western Provinces, British Raj
- Died: 23 May 1987 (aged 92); California, Kentucky
- Education: University of Pennsylvania Medical School (MD)
- Occupations: Medical missionary, ophthalmologist, surgeon
- Known for: Medical missionary work, establishing mobile eye clinics, performing cataract surgeries
- Spouse: Louise Birch (1923–1987; his death)

Victor Clough Rambo (1894 – May 23, 1987) was an American medical missionary and ophthalmologist who worked in India from 1924 to 1974 for the United Christian Missionary Society, of which the former Foreign Christian Missionary Society became part in 1920. In India, Rambo served as the medical director of the Christian Hospital Mungeli and initiated the development of eye camps, groups of medical surgeons that visited towns, set up cataract removal stations, and restored sight to the partially blind through eye surgeries. Under Rambo's leadership, the hospital conducted over 150 eye camps in over 25 villages. It is estimated that the implementation of these eye camps helped restore sight to over 40,000 patients.

== Early life ==
=== Childhood ===
Victor Clough Rambo was born in Landour, India in 1894 to parents William Eagle Rambo and Kate Rambo, both missionaries working for the Foreign Christian Missionary Society at the time. In January 1895, when Victor was six months old, the family moved to Damoh, the location of the boys’ orphanage where William taught. The area suffered from monsoon floods, starvation, and disease and over the next five years, the population of the district decreased by about 40,000 people. As more families went hungry, government-sponsored trains sent hundreds of orphans from the north of the country to the Damoh orphanage, where William started farms on which many of the orphans worked and were provided clothing and food. From his father's work, he was exposed to the consequences of starvation, cholera and illness, even noting, "I had such a boyhood... no one else could dream of." Raised in a strict Christian family, Rambo was taught to value the Bible and the teachings of Christianity. While living with the other families on the mission compound, he learned conversational Hindi from the native workers.

=== Return to the United States ===
In the spring of 1904, the family moved back to the United States, after William and Kate fell ill. The family spent the summer of that year in New Hampshire on a farm with Kate's sister before they relocated to Des Moines, Iowa. In 1908, the family moved to Farson, Wyoming where they settled for the next five years, living in a small three-room house. During the five years in Farson, Rambo and the family planted crops and raised chickens for food, often struggling to produce enough for all members of the household. When Rambo was sixteen, he began working as a water boy to earn money for the family. He soon got a more permanent job driving a Fresno scraper, a metal basket that dumped dirt into an irrigation ditch, but was subsequently fired after he joined a group of workers protesting the wage. He then worked as an orderly in the local hospital and caught the attention of the resident doctor, who began to teach him common procedures such as catheterization. After the doctor left the hospital, Rambo performed many of the former doctor's duties, assisting in the operating room and helping out with emergencies at midnight. He learned to recognize and use different surgical knives and other tools and started handling the catheterization of paraplegics. He attended a nursing class and was two months short of graduating with a registered nurse's certificate when the family suddenly moved to Idaho after William was asked to preach in Emmett. In March 1914, the family moved again to Chehalis, Washington, where Rambo remained until September 1915, graduating from high school at the age of twenty-one.

=== Education ===
Rambo attended Fairmount College, now Wichita State University, in Wichita, Kansas and graduated in 1917. He was admitted to the University of Pennsylvania Medical School, now Perelman School of Medicine, and received his medical degree in 1921 at the age of twenty-seven. In order to pay for medical school, Rambo worked as a janitor, busboy, and furnace-keeper. He soon received a scholarship for medical school from members of the Penn Christian Association, who formed a group that would eventually be known as the Rambo Committee, an organization that supported Rambo throughout his time in India and beyond. While completing his hospital residency at Pennsylvania Hospital, Rambo was chosen by the head of experimental surgery to stay in the department after residency, but he declined the offer and expressed his desire to become a medical missionary instead. At end of June 1923, Rambo finished his two years of residency and applied to be an overseas medical missionary, despite having been offered the position of Dean of Meharry Medical College in Nashville at the time of his graduation. Four days after applying, he was assigned to do work in India by the United Christian Missionary Society. In June, Rambo was ordained as a minister in the Church of Christ and in August, he was made a diplomate of the National Board of Medical Examiners.

== Missionary Journey ==
Victor Rambo married Louise Birch on October 8, 1923, in Germantown, Pennsylvania. The couple left for India from Seattle and arrived in Calcutta on January 12, 1924. They stayed in Calcutta for a few days and then headed to Harda, a town where they studied Hindi for about three months with a teacher. Knowledge of Hindi was a requisite for missionary work in India, so in March, the Rambos moved to Landour to study the language further. There, Rambo worked in a small mission hospital, assisting in surgery. In September, the Rambos returned to Harda to take their required first-year language oral exams, which they both passed. In December, they left for Mungeli, a small town in central India with a population of about 5,000 people, that served as a central hub for the 250,000 people in the 250 surrounding villages. The Mungeli mission station was located on one side of the Agar River and the town on the other, and soon, Rambo started work at the local hospital.

== Medical missionary work ==
=== Work with Christian Hospital Mungeli ===
Rambo became the medical director of the Christian Hospital Mungeli in 1925. He worked at the hospital with Hira Lal, an Indian man who had learned to deliver children, hold clinics, and treat malaria and other diseases from former missionaries, despite having no medical degree of his own. When Rambo arrived, he faced many challenges. The hospital building only had four rooms, one for storage, two for examining patients, and one for operating. There was no plumbing or proper medical equipment, which made it challenging for him to perform surgery. He encountered a variety of surgical cases, ranging from childbirth emergencies to infections resulting from accidents. The most prevalent diseases during Rambo's early years in Mungeli were yaws and syphilis. Rambo sent workers into villages to gather all people with symptoms of these or other significant diseases and give them injections for their ailments. In one year alone, Rambo, Hira Lal and other workers treated nearly 17,000 patients in outlying dispensaries and performed over 737 operations.

During his time in India, Rambo gained many supporters, and the hospital's facilities and delivery of medical services expanded substantially, as the building grew from a four-room hospital into a 120-bed surgical unit known for treating eye disease. The hospital was remodeled to include an outpatient department, lab, and records room and several new wards after it accepted a substantial donation from a supporter back in the United States. Rambo received new operating, delivery, and examining rooms for eye patients. Prime Minister Indira Gandhi provided Rambo with equipment and instruments worth over 10,000 dollars, and Oxfam donated additional supplies.

=== Focus on eye care ===
Over time, Rambo noticed that blindness was a major problem in the region. Rambo was aware that for many years, people in the region had relied on "couchers," men who traveled with broken razor blades and performed relatively painless eye surgeries on partially blind patients. They would make an incision in the cornea and push the hardened lens back into the vitreous, restoring sight for the patient. However, 97% of patients lost use of the eye within months after surgery, and although couching was outlawed by the government, many people still consulted couchers for surgery.

Rambo started performing cataract operations after successfully removing two cataracts from a patient's eye. He was initially hesitant to perform more surgeries, having had limited experience in ophthalmology, but began to treat more patients after a large number of blind individuals approached him for operations. Under Rambo's leadership, the hospital became well known for its work in restoring sight through the use of "eye camps," surgical teams from the hospital that traveled to villages and performed eye surgeries, often cataract removal surgeries. Rambo thought of the idea of an "eye camp" after speaking with a patient who suggested that he come to the villages to perform operations, because he knew many individuals who had lost their vision and could not make the journey out to the distant mission hospital. He was originally hesitant to pursue the idea, knowing the potential risks of operating in a non-sterilized environment. After consulting with Hira Lal, who suggested Rambo test the concept, he decided to go to a village about nineteen miles from Mungeli. When he arrived at the village, there were about fifty people waiting for him to begin operating. He operated on their eyes using a teacher's desk as a table and was able to remove nineteen cataracts that day successfully.

As Rambo traveled to villages and performed more operations, he discovered that cataracts accounted for about 55% of all cases of blindness in the country. Determined to mitigate the blindness problem in India, Rambo held the first official eye camp in March 1943 in Kawardha, an area forty-five miles away from Mungeli. There was an adequately equipped hospital in the area with about eight clean beds, and Rambo was able to perform ninety-five successful operations that day, most of them for cataract removal. Camps were held during the winter months in churches, schoolhouses, temples, and other large buildings, and the doctors used slit-lamp microscopes and instruments kept in boxes to prevent contamination. They followed the same procedure as in an official hospital: they sterilized instruments by boiling them and then using a pressure cooker. Over the next twenty five years, the hospital held more than 150 eye camps in over 25 villages and restored the sight of many.

In 1955, when she was visiting India, Helen Keller met with Rambo because of his work with curable blind people.

=== Teaching ===
In 1947, Rambo began teaching part-time in the Ophthalmology Department at the Christian Medical College, located in Vellore. Over the course of the next ten years, he spent half of each year teaching and the other six months working in Mungeli. Rambo taught both undergraduate and graduate medical and nursing classes and encouraged students to watch and participate in his surgeries. From 1947 to 1958, he served as chief of the Eye Department at Christian Medical College and was named chief of the Eye Department of Christian Medical College, Ludhiana in 1959.

=== Role of the Rambo Committee ===
Throughout the fifty years of Rambo's career, the Rambo Committee sent medical supplies, equipment, literature, and funds to support the education of dozens of Indian physicians and Dr. Rambo's work. In the 1930s, the committee purchased hospital beds and surgical supplies for the hospital. In the 1970s, the committee adopted the name, "Rambo Committee, Inc.," and had an annual budget of approximately $50,000, which was used to support the work in India as well as the work of Dr. Rambo's son, Dr. Birch Rambo, a medical missionary in Zaire. The committee provided the funds to open the Good Samaritan Hospital in Nigeria in 1970. After Dr. Rambo and his wife left India, the Rambo Committee provided financial support to keep the Christian Hospital Mungeli open from 1980 to 2003, when it experienced a lack of incoming funds!.

== Later life and death ==
In 1957, Rambo was elected president of the All-India Ophthalmological Society. In the late 1960s and early 1970s, he still performed surgeries, but left many of his operations to other doctors. He spent time in Ludhiana, India in the fall and winter attending various conferences, seminars, and speaking engagements. During this period, the eye camps that Dr. Rambo helped established treated more than five thousand patients. The teams at Vellore, Sompeta, Mungeli, and Ludhiana completed more than fourteen thousand eye operations, despite India's increased fighting with Pakistan in 1969. Rambo wanted to bring eye camps even farther than India, stating, "I want to have our science of sight restoration reach every single person with curable blindness in every needy nation." In 1969, Rambo and Arin Chatterjee, a fellow physician, wrote a guide on mobile eye hospitals called The Curable Blind: A Guide for Establishing and Maintaining Mobile Eye Hospitals, a detailed book on the history, techniques, personnel, equipment, surgical procedures and care of patients in mobile eye hospitals.

The Rambos returned to the United States in 1974, settling in Germantown, Pennsylvania, after more than half a century of service in India. They returned to India in 1976 to attend the fiftieth anniversary of the Christian Medical Association of India. In the United States, Rambo continued to work with the Rambo Committee to raise funds for projects in Mungeli.

In 1980, Dorothy Clarke Wilson published a biography of Victor C. Rambo called Apostle of Sight.

On May 23, 1987, Rambo died at the age of 92 in California, Kentucky. He was survived by his wife, five children, fifteen grandchildren, and two great-grandchildren.

== Legacy ==
Rambo received many awards for his work, including the Gold Kaisar-i-Hind Medal from King George VI in 1941 for exceptional public service. In 1969, Rambo received the Ehrenzeller Award given by the ex-Residents Association of the Pennsylvania Hospital for distinguished service. In 1994, the Church of North India opened the Rambo School, named in honor of Dr. Rambo and his legacy, in a bungalow near the Christian Hospital Mungeli. The school, now reconstructed and referred to as the Rambo Memorial English Medium School, provides low-cost English education to children of hospital staff. In 2012, the school enrolled over 600 children aged seven through fifteen. Due to his work in India, Rambo was posthumously inducted into the Medical Missions Hall of Fame in 2008.

== Sources ==
- Wilson, Dorothy Clarke (1980). Apostle of Sight. Chappaqua, N.Y.: Christian Herald Books. ISBN 0-915684-54-3.
