= Beatrice Marian Smyth =

Beatrice Marian Smyth (1894-1965) was an American physician and missionary who was a member of the Church of England Zenana Missionary Society (CEZMS). Smyth was in charge of the CEZMS mission in Rainawari, a locality in Srinagar City in Jammu and Kashmir state, India. She led the opening of the Elizabeth Newman Hospital in January 1937, and started a training school for nurses in Kashmir.

== Early life and education ==
Beatrice Smyth was born on May 19, 1894, in Orlando, Florida. She was the daughter of Arthur William Catesby Smyth and Beatrice Alice Smyth. Smyth had three siblings who were also born in Florida. From 1903-1906, Smyth attended the Cathedral School, a Catholic school, in Orlando, Florida. In 1906, she moved to Tunbridge Wells, England, and resided with her grandmother and aunts. From 1906-1913, Smyth attended the Thornleigh School in Tunbridge Wells. For undergraduate education, Smyth attended Birbeck, University of London, for one year (1917–1918), and then Newnham College, at the University of Cambridge, from 1918 to 1921. Smyth attended the London Hospital from 1921 to 1924. From 1921 to 1924, she received her Membership of the Royal College of Surgeons of England (MRCS), and following, her Licentiate diploma (LRCP).

== Career ==
In 1925, Smyth went on brief medical missions to Mullion, UK, and Rainawari, India. During this time, she began her work with CEZMS at the Rainawari hospital in India.

Smyth was the initiator—and head—of the Elizabeth Newman Hospital in Rainawari. The hospital was originally founded in 1908 by the CEZMS with Elizabeth Mary Newman, the "Florence Nightingale of Kashmir". In 1934, Smyth went back to England and advocated to the members of CEZMS that a larger hospital was vital in Kashmir. With time, Smyth was able to acquire all the necessary funds to develop this new hospital which was complete in 1936. Smyth was interested in uplifting the women of Kashmir, and involving them in the medical field there and she started a training school for nurses in the state. The Rainawari hospital is now known as the Jawahar Lal Nehru Memorial Hospital after being taken over by the government. Smyth often performed blood transfusions, child births, and anaemia cases.

== Death and legacy ==
Smyth improved the medical field of Kashmir by expanding the medical capacity and through facilitating employment and religious opportunities for the women and girls. After her fifteen years of work, Smyth went on a six month trip around India, visiting friends and exploring new regions. After this, Smyth continued her medical work in England and Kashmir. She continued to fundraise for medical developments and recruit female physicians to assist in Rainawari, while remaining a devout Christian. Smyth officially retired in 1946, and died in March 1965, in Worthing, Norfolk, England.
