= Charlotte C. Wyckoff =

American educator and writer (1893–1966)

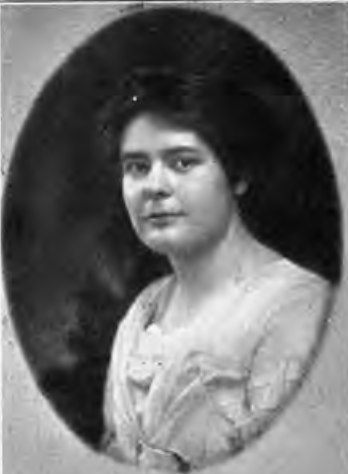
- Charlotte C. Wyckoff, from a 1915 publication
- Born: April 30, 1893; Kodaikanal, India
- Died: July 22, 1966 (age 73); New York City, U.S.
- Occupations: Missionary, educator, writer

Charlotte Chandler Wyckoff (April 30, 1893 – July 22, 1966) was an American writer and missionary educator, based in India.

== Early life and education ==
Wyckoff was born in Kodaikanal, Tamil Nadu, the daughter of John Henry Wyckoff, who was a surgeon, and Gertrude Abigail Chandler Wyckoff. Her parents were American missionaries from the Dutch Reformed Church tradition. Her mother was also born in India, the sister of missionary John Scudder Chandler.

Wyckoff graduated from her mother's alma mater, Wellesley College, in 1915, and pursued further studies at Columbia University. Her older brother, John Henry Wyckoff Jr., was a cardiology professor, and dean of the medical school at New York University.

== Career ==
Wyckoff used her language and cultural skills (she was a fluent Tamil speaker) to join her widowed mother's mission work in Arcot, India. She also taught at Women's Christian College in Madras (Chennai). In the 1940s, she organized and ran a rural center in Mattathur, supported by donations from American church groups. Her program included a school, a day nursery, evening classes, and a dispensary.

Wyckoff spoke to American audiences about her missionary work on furlough visits in 1939 and 1948.

== Publications ==
Wyckoff wrote novels, stories, and non-fiction with Indian themes. She wrote several pamphlets for church distribution, about her work in India. "Charlotte C. Wyckoff, who knows her subject well, has succeeded in turning out another of those sugar-coated pills of knowledge that is 'good stuff' for school children to absorb," wrote one reviewer in 1933.

- "Mr. Eddy in Vellore" (1916, article about Sherwood Eddy)
- "Teaching high school in India" (1916, pamphlet)
- "The Call for Leaders" (1918, pamphlet)
- "The Jungle Child" (1923, story)
- "Out of the Chysalis" (1930, pamphlet)
- "Vadakku-Pattrai: Conditions in the front-line trenches" (1930, pamphlet)
- Jothy, a Story of the South Indian Jungle (1933, novel, illustrated by Kurt Wiese)
- "Up the School Steps" (1938)
- One Fold and One Shepherd (1939)
- "Good out of Nazareth?": A program on village work (1939)
- Kodaikanal 1845-1945 (1945)
- American Arcot Mission (1953)
- Kumar (1965, novel, illustrated by Robin Jacques)

== Personal life ==
Wyckoff retired and moved to the United States in 1960, and lived in Bound Brook, New Jersey. In retirement she remained active, speaking to church groups about her life in India. She died in 1966, at the age of 73. A restaurant in Kodaikanal is named Wyckoff's Dining Room by Chef Shadab who discovered about Wyckoff via many archives available online & other information gathered from oldest residents of Kodaikanal, the hotel villa retreat was home to Wyckoff's family until 1960, in reference to Charlotte C. Wyckoff.
