= Robert Ernest Hume =

Indian-born American author and academic (1877–1948)

- Born: March 20, 1877; Ahmednagar, India
- Died: January 4, 1948 (aged 70); New York City, New York, USA
- Education: Yale University

Robert Ernest Hume (March 20, 1877 – January 4, 1948) was an Indian-born American author and professor of the History of Religions at Union Theological Seminary, Christian missionary in India, and congregational minister. His translation of The Thirteen Principle Upanishads is seen as the standard for the work.

== Life ==
Robert E. Hume was born on March 20, 1877, in Ahmednagar, India to Christian missionary parents, Robert Allen Hume and Abbie Burgess. He received his early education in India through his parents' missionary schools and later attended Newton High School in Massachusetts. Hume received his BA, MA, and PhD at Yale, after which he attended Union Theological for seminary school.

== Works ==
- Hinduism and War (1916) The American Journal of Theology, vol. 20, 31-44
- The Thirteen Principal Upanishads, with an Outline of the Philosophy of the Upanishads (1921) New York: Oxford University Press
- The World’s Living Religions (1924) New York: Scribner
- Treasure-house of the Living Religions (1932) New York: Scribner
