= 1821 Maryland gubernatorial election =

- December 10, 1821
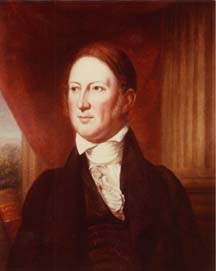
Nominee	Samuel Sprigg
Party	Democratic-Republican
Popular vote	72
Percentage	83.72%
Governor before election
Samuel Sprigg
Democratic-Republican
Elected Governor
Samuel Sprigg
Democratic-Republican

The 1821 Maryland gubernatorial election was held on December 10, 1821, in order to elect the governor of Maryland. Incumbent Democratic-Republican governor Samuel Sprigg was re-elected by the Maryland General Assembly against former Federalist governor Charles Goldsborough, Democratic-Republican candidates John Leeds Kerr and George C. Washington and Federalist candidates Robert Goodloe Harper, Robert Henry Goldsborough, John Eager Howard, John C. Herbert and Roger B. Taney.

== General election ==
On election day, December 10, 1821, incumbent Democratic-Republican governor Samuel Sprigg was re-elected by the Maryland General Assembly, thereby retaining Democratic-Republican control over the office of governor. Sprigg was sworn in for his third term on December 17, 1821.

=== Results ===
Maryland gubernatorial election, 1821
Party	Candidate	Votes	%
Democratic-Republican	Samuel Sprigg (incumbent)	72	83.72
Federalist	Charles Goldsborough	3	3.49
Federalist	Robert Goodloe Harper	3	3.49
Federalist	Robert Henry Goldsborough	2	2.33
Federalist	John Eager Howard	2	2.33
Democratic-Republican	John Leeds Kerr	1	1.16
Democratic-Republican	George C. Washington	1	1.16
Federalist	John C. Herbert	1	1.16
Federalist	Roger B. Taney	1	1.16
Total votes		86	100.00
Democratic-Republican hold			
