= 1824 Maryland gubernatorial election =

- December 13, 1824
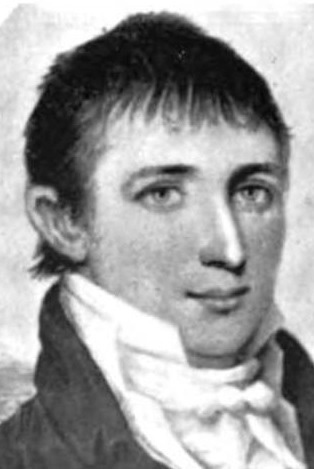
| Nominee | Samuel Stevens Jr. |
| Party | Democratic-Republican |
| Popular vote | 67 |
| Percentage | 85.90% |
Governor before election
Samuel Stevens Jr.
Democratic-Republican
Elected Governor
Samuel Stevens Jr.
Democratic-Republican

The 1824 Maryland gubernatorial election was held on December 13, 1824, in order to elect the governor of Maryland. Incumbent Democratic-Republican governor Samuel Stevens Jr. was re-elected by the Maryland General Assembly against former Federalist governor Charles Goldsborough, Democratic-Republican candidate Roger B. Taney and Federalist candidates Robert Henry Goldsborough and John Eager Howard.

== General election ==
On election day, December 13, 1824, incumbent Democratic-Republican governor Samuel Stevens Jr. was re-elected by the Maryland General Assembly, thereby retaining Democratic-Republican control over the office of governor. Stevens was sworn in for his third term on January 3, 1825.

=== Results ===
Maryland gubernatorial election, 1824
| Party | Candidate | Votes | % |
|---|---|---|---|
| Democratic-Republican | Samuel Stevens Jr. (incumbent) | 67 | 85.90 |
| | Did Not Vote | 5 | 6.41 |
| Federalist | Charles Goldsborough | 3 | 3.85 |
| Democratic-Republican | Roger B. Taney | 1 | 1.28 |
| Federalist | Robert Henry Goldsborough | 1 | 1.28 |
| Federalist | John Eager Howard | 1 | 1.28 |
| Total votes | | 78 | 100.00 |
| Democratic-Republican hold | | | |
