= 1820 Maryland gubernatorial election =

- December 11, 1820
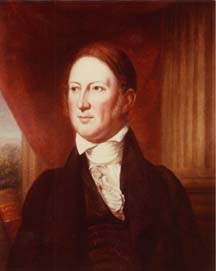

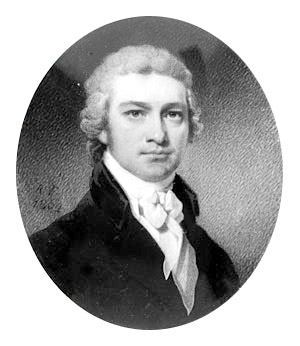
Nominee	Samuel Sprigg	Charles Goldsborough
Party	Democratic-Republican	Federalist
Popular vote	48	46
Percentage	51.06%	48.94%
Governor before election
Samuel Sprigg
Democratic-Republican
Elected Governor
Samuel Sprigg
Democratic-Republican

The 1820 Maryland gubernatorial election was held on December 11, 1820, in order to elect the governor of Maryland. Incumbent Democratic-Republican governor Samuel Sprigg was re-elected by the Maryland General Assembly against former Federalist governor Charles Goldsborough in a rematch of the previous election.

== General election ==
On election day, December 11, 1820, incumbent Democratic-Republican governor Samuel Sprigg was re-elected by the Maryland General Assembly, thereby retaining Democratic-Republican control over the office of governor. Sprigg was sworn in for his second term on December 18, 1820.

=== Results ===
Maryland gubernatorial election, 1820
Party	Candidate	Votes	%
Democratic-Republican	Samuel Sprigg (incumbent)	48	51.06
Federalist	Charles Goldsborough	46	48.94
Total votes		94	100.00
Democratic-Republican hold			
