= Stoddert =

Stoddert may refer to:

== People ==
- Benjamin Stoddert (1751–1813), United States Secretary of the Navy
- John Truman Stoddert (1790–1870), American politician

== Places ==
- Fort Stoddert
- Stoddert, Virginia

== Other uses ==
- USS Benjamin Stoddert, armed destroyer in the United States Navy
