= Brattan =

Brattan is a surname. Notable people with the surname include:

- Jack Brattan (1931–2010), Irish football player
- Joshua Brattan (died 1838), American politician
- Luke Brattan (born 1990), Australian football player
- Robert Franklin Brattan (1845–1894), American politician and lawyer

== See also ==
- Bratton (surname)
