= Bratton (surname) =

Bratton is a surname. Notable people with the surname include:

- Benjamin Bratton, American fencer
- Benjamin H. Bratton (born 1968), American sociologist
- Brian Bratton (born 1982), Canadian football player
- Chris Bratton (disambiguation), several people
- Christopher Bratton, American educator and administrator
- Creed Bratton (born 1943), American musician and actor
- Darrius Bratton (born 1997), American football player
- David Bratton (1869–1904), American water polo player and swimmer
- Donald Bratton (born 1947), American politician
- Elegance Bratton (born 1979), American filmmaker and photographer
- Heather Bratton (1987–2006), American model
- J. Rufus Bratton (1821–1897), American doctor, army surgeon, civic and Ku Klux Klan leader
- John Bratton (1831–1898), American politician and general
- John W. Bratton (1867–1947), American composer and theatrical producer
- Johnny Bratton (1927–1993), American boxer
- Joseph K. Bratton (1926–2007), American Army officer and nuclear engineer
- Lisa Bratton (born 1996), American swimmer
- Martha Bratton (c. 1749/50–1816), American patriot during the Revolutionary War
- Mel Bratton (born 1965), American football player
- Robert Bratton (disambiguation), several people
- Rufus S. Bratton (1892–1958), American intelligence officer
- Sam G. Bratton (1888–1963), American politician and judge
- Shawn Bratton, American Air Force officer
- Theodore DuBose Bratton (1862–1944), American bishop
- Ulysses Simpson Bratton (1868–1947), American lawyer and politician
- Wilfred Bratton, Australian football player
- William Bratton (born 1947), American police officer
- William Wilson Bratton (1913–1984), American politician from Maryland

== See also ==
- Brattan
