= Albert Fairfax, 12th Lord Fairfax of Cameron =

American-born British peer and politician (1870–1939)

The Right Honourable The Lord Fairfax of Cameron
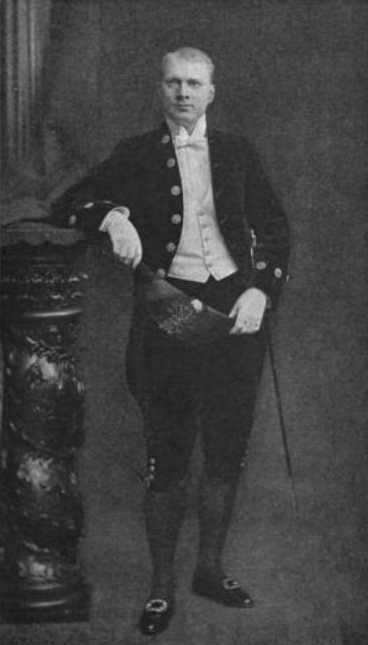
- In The Sketch, 27 May 1903

Member of the House of Lords Lord Temporal
- In office 19 October 1917 – 4 October 1939; Scottish representative peer

Personal details
- Born: June 23, 1870 Largo, Maryland, U.S.
- Died: 4 October 1939 (aged 69) London, England, U.K.
- Spouse: Maude Wishart McKelvie
- Parent(s): John Fairfax, 11th Lord Fairfax of Cameron; Mary Brown Kirby

Albert Kirby Fairfax, 12th Lord Fairfax of Cameron (23 June 1870 – 4 October 1939) was an Anglo-American peer and politician who sat in the House of Lords.

== Early life ==
Born at Northampton Plantation, in Largo, Prince George's County, Maryland, Fairfax was discovered to be the rightful holder of his title after it had been essentially forgotten by his family, which had resided in the United States for several generations. After researchers determined Fairfax to be the 12th Lord Fairfax of Cameron, his title was confirmed by the House of Lords in 1908. His father was John Fairfax, 11th Lord Fairfax of Cameron, and his mother was Lady Mary Brown Kirby Fairfax.

== Career ==
He was a member of Fairfax & Company, of George Street, London and a partner of Bonbright & Company, George Street, London.

He was naturalized as a U.K. citizen on 17 November 1908. He was elected a Scottish Representative Peer and served in that capacity from 19 October 1917 to his death on 4 October 1939.

== Personal life ==
Lord Fairfax of Cameron married Maude Wishart McKelvie, daughter of James McKelvie, in 1922. They had two sons:

- Thomas Brian McElvie Fairfax, 13th Lord Fairfax of Cameron (14 May 1923 – 8 April 1964), who married Sonia Helen Gunston (b. 1926)
- Hon. Peregrine John Wishart Fairfax (8 March 1925 – 23 February 2012)

The 12th Lord Fairfax died in October 1939, aged 69, and was succeeded in the lordship by the elder of his two sons.

Peerage of Scotland
Preceded by John Contee Fairfax	Lord Fairfax of Cameron; 1900–1939	Succeeded by Thomas Fairfax
