= Senator Goldsborough =

Senator Goldsborough may refer to:

- Phillips Lee Goldsborough (1865–1946), U.S. Senator from Maryland from 1929 to 1935
- Robert Henry Goldsborough (1779–1836), U.S. Senator from Maryland from 1813 to 1819 and from 1835 to 1836
