= Bratton =

Bratton may refer to:

== Places ==
- Bratton, Saskatchewan, Canada
- Bratton, Shropshire, England
- Bratton, Somerset, England
- Bratton, Wiltshire, England

== Other ==
- Bratton (surname)

== See also ==
- Bratton Fleming, Devon
- Bratton Seymour, Somerset
- Brattön island, Kungälv, Sweden
