= Senator Bratton (disambiguation) =

Sam G. Bratton (1888–1963) was a U.S. Senator from New Mexico from 1925 to 1933. Senator Bratton may also refer to:

- John Bratton (1831–1898), South Carolina State Senate
- Robert Franklin Brattan (1845–1894), Maryland State Senate
