= Governor Goldsborough =

Governor Goldsborough may refer to:

- Charles Goldsborough (1765–1834), 16th Governor of Maryland
- Phillips Lee Goldsborough (1865–1946), 47th Governor of Maryland
