= 53rd United States Congress =

1893-1895 U.S. Congress

←	52nd	54th	→
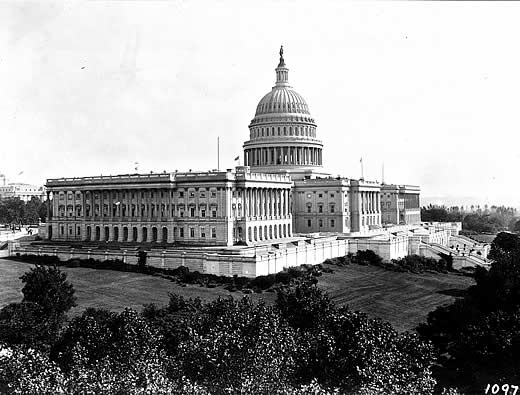
- United States Capitol (1906)

Overview
- Legislative body: United States Congress
- Jurisdiction: United States
- Term: March 4, 1893 – March 4, 1895

Senate
- Members: 88
- President: Adlai E. Stevenson (D)
- President pro tempore: Charles F. Manderson (R); Isham G. Harris (D) (twice); Matt W. Ransom (D)
- Party control: Democratic (plurality)

House of Representatives
- Members: 356 representatives 4 non-voting delegates
- Speaker: Charles F. Crisp (D)
- Party control: Democratic

Sessions
- 1st: August 7, 1893 – November 3, 1893
- 2nd: December 4, 1893 – August 28, 1894
- 3rd: December 3, 1894 – March 3, 1895

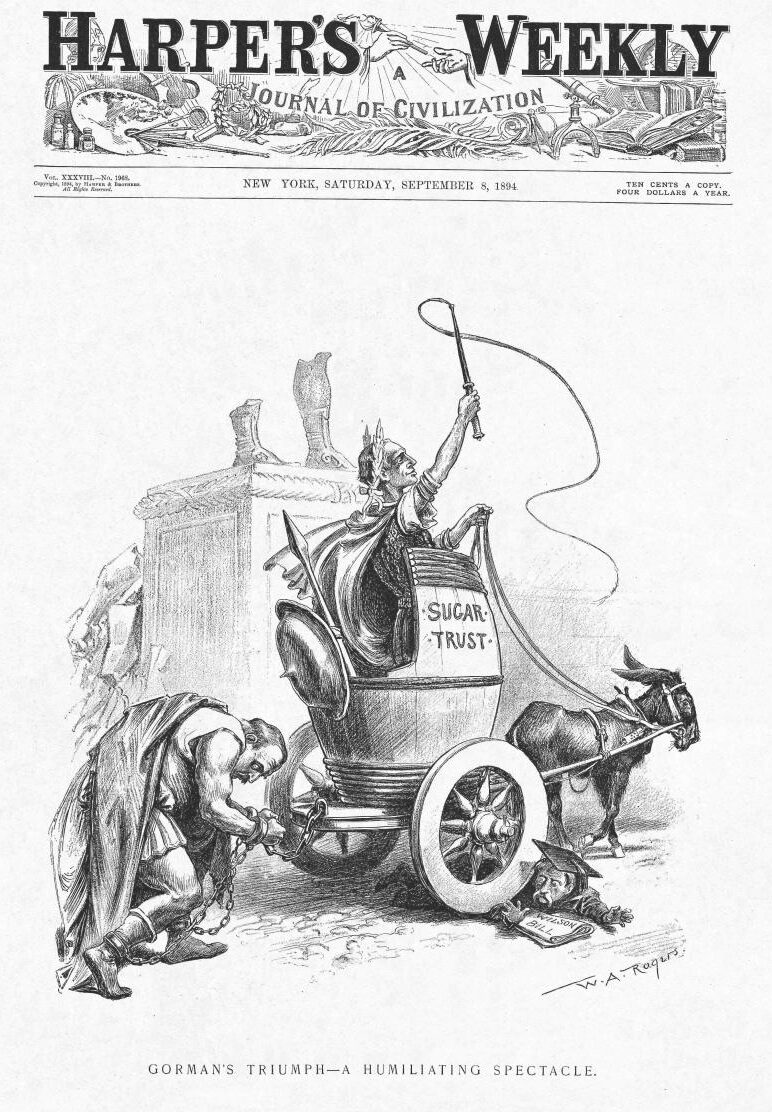
"Gorman's Triumph— A Humiliating Spectacle", cartoon by W. A. Rogers depicting President Cleveland's humiliation by the Sugar Trust.

The 53rd United States Congress was a meeting of the legislative branch of the United States federal government, consisting of the United States Senate and the United States House of Representatives. It met in Washington, D.C., from March 4, 1893, to March 4, 1895, during the first two years of Grover Cleveland's second presidency. The apportionment of seats in the House of Representatives was based on the 1890 United States census.

The Democrats maintained their majority in the House (albeit reduced) and won back control of the Senate. With Grover Cleveland being sworn in on March 4, 1893, for his second stint as president, this also gave the Democrats an overall federal government trifecta for the first time since the establishment of the Republican Party in 1854.

== Major events ==
- March 4, 1893: Grover Cleveland became President of the United States for a second time.
- May 5, 1893: Panic of 1893: A crash on the New York Stock Exchange started a depression.
- November 7, 1893: Colorado women were granted the right to vote
- May 1, 1894: Coxey's Army, the first significant American protest march, arrived in Washington, D.C.

== Major legislation ==
- July 16, 1894: Utah Enabling Act
- August 27, 1894: Wilson–Gorman Tariff Act
- February 18, 1895: Maguire Act of 1895

== Party summary ==
The count below identifies party affiliations at the beginning of the first session of this Congress, and includes members from vacancies and newly admitted states, when they were first seated. Changes resulting from subsequent replacements are shown below in the "Changes in membership" section.

=== Senate ===
	Party (shading shows control)				Total	Vacant
	Democratic (D)	Populist (P)	Republican (R)	Silver (S)	Total	Vacant
End of previous congress	39	2	47	0	88	0
Begin	44	3	37	1	85	3
End	43	3	41	1	88	0
Final voting share	48.9%	3.4%	46.6%	1.1%		
Beginning of next congress	39	4	42	2	87	1

=== House of Representatives ===
	Party (shading shows control)					Total	Vacant
	Democratic (D)	Independent Democratic (ID)	Populist (P)	Republican (R)	Silver (S)	Total	Vacant
End of previous congress	233	0	9	86	0	328	4
Begin	213	1	11	127	1	353	3
End	214	1	11	123	1	350	6
Final voting share	61.1%	0.3%	3.1%	35.1%	0.3%		
Beginning of next congress	104	0	7	240	1	352	4

== Leadership ==
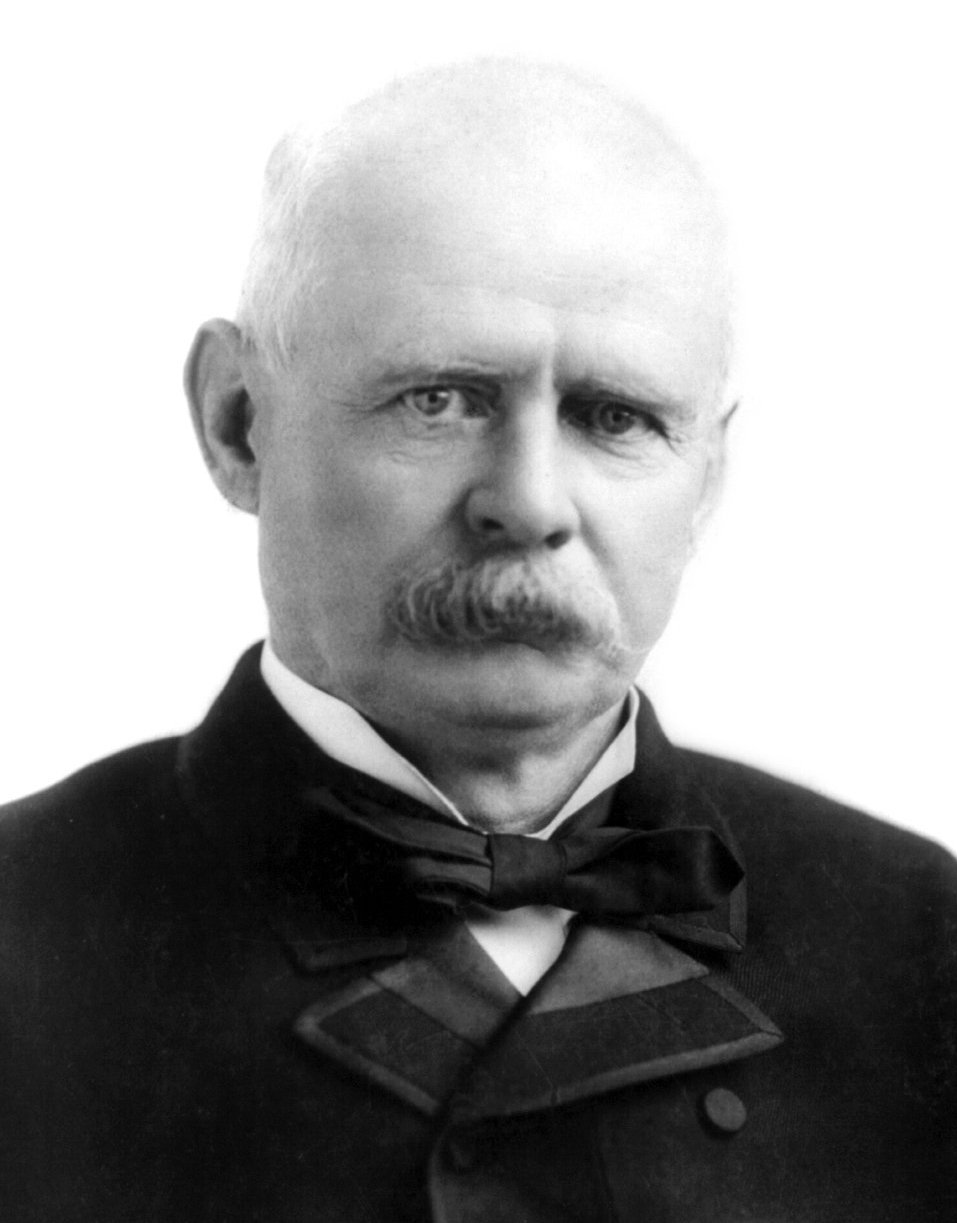
Senate President Adlai Stevenson

=== Senate ===
- President: Adlai Stevenson (D)
- President pro tempore: Charles F. Manderson (D)
  - Isham G. Harris (D), elected March 22, 1893
  - Matt Whitaker Ransom (D), elected January 7, 1895
  - Isham G. Harris (D), elected January 10, 1895
- Democratic Caucus Chairman: Arthur P. Gorman
- Republican Conference Chairman: John Sherman

=== House of Representatives ===
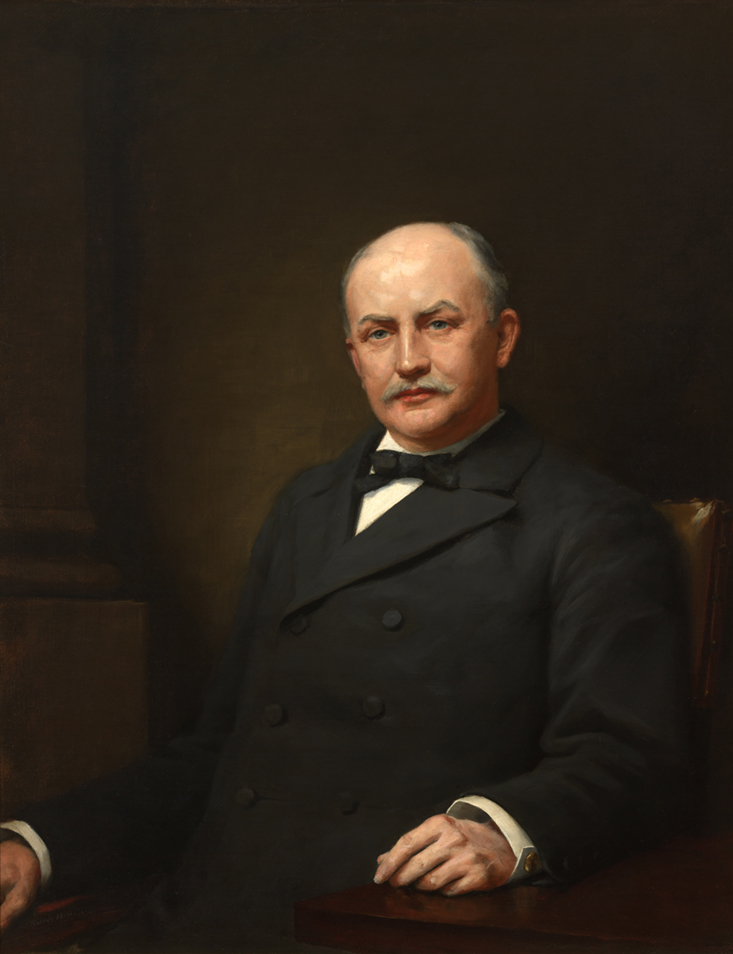
House Speaker Charles F. Crisp

- Speaker: Charles F. Crisp (D)
- Minority Leader: Thomas B. Reed (R)
- Democratic Caucus Chairman: William S. Holman
- Democratic Campaign Committee Chairman: Charles James Faulkner
- Republican Conference Chairman: Thomas J. Henderson
- Republican Campaign Committee Chairman: Joseph W. Babcock

== Members ==
This list is arranged by chamber, then by state. Senators are listed by class and Members of the House are listed by district.

Skip to House of Representatives, below

=== Senate ===
Senators were elected by the state legislatures every two years, with one-third beginning new six-year terms with each Congress. Preceding the names in the list below are Senate class numbers, which indicate the cycle of their election. In this Congress, Class 1 meant their term began in this Congress, facing re-election in 1898; Class 2 meant their term ended in this Congress, facing re-election in 1894; and Class 3 meant their term began in the last Congress, facing re-election in 1896.

==== Alabama ====
▌2. John T. Morgan (D)
▌3. James L. Pugh (D)

==== Arkansas ====
▌2. James H. Berry (D)
▌3. James K. Jones (D)

==== California ====
▌1. Stephen M. White (D)
▌3. Leland Stanford (R), until June 21, 1893

▌George C. Perkins (R), from July 26, 1893

==== Colorado ====
▌2. Edward O. Wolcott (R)
▌3. Henry M. Teller (R)

==== Connecticut ====
▌1. Joseph R. Hawley (R)
▌3. Orville H. Platt (R)

==== Delaware ====
▌1. George Gray (D)
▌2. Anthony Higgins (R)

==== Florida ====
▌1. Samuel Pasco (D)
▌3. Wilkinson Call (D)

==== Georgia ====
▌2. Alfred H. Colquitt (D), until March 26, 1894

▌Patrick Walsh (D), from April 2, 1894

▌3. John B. Gordon (D)

==== Idaho ====
▌2. George L. Shoup (R)
▌3. Fred T. Dubois (R)

==== Illinois ====
▌2. Shelby M. Cullom (R)
▌3. John McAuley Palmer (D)

==== Indiana ====
▌1. David Turpie (D)
▌3. Daniel W. Voorhees (D)

==== Iowa ====
▌2. James F. Wilson (R)
▌3. William B. Allison (R)

==== Kansas ====
▌2. John Martin (D)
▌3. William A. Peffer (P)

==== Kentucky ====
▌2. William Lindsay (D)
▌3. Joseph C. S. Blackburn (D)

==== Louisiana ====
▌2. Donelson Caffery (D)
▌3. Edward D. White Jr. (D), until March 12, 1894

▌Newton C. Blanchard (D), from March 12, 1894

==== Maine ====
▌1. Eugene Hale (R)
▌2. William P. Frye (R)

==== Maryland ====
▌1. Arthur Pue Gorman (D)
▌3. Charles H. Gibson (D)

==== Massachusetts ====
▌1. Henry Cabot Lodge (R)
▌2. George F. Hoar (R)

==== Michigan ====
▌1. Francis B. Stockbridge (R), until April 30, 1894

▌John Patton Jr. (R), from May 5, 1894, until January 14, 1895
▌Julius C. Burrows (R), from January 24, 1895

▌2. James McMillan (R)

==== Minnesota ====
▌1. Cushman K. Davis (R)
▌2. William D. Washburn (R)

==== Mississippi ====
▌1. James Z. George (D)
▌2. Edward C. Walthall (D), until January 24, 1894

▌Anselm J. McLaurin (D), from February 7, 1894

==== Missouri ====
▌1. Francis Cockrell (D)
▌3. George G. Vest (D)

==== Montana ====
▌1. Lee Mantle (R), from January 16, 1895
▌2. Thomas C. Power (R)

==== Nebraska ====
▌1. William V. Allen (P)
▌2. Charles F. Manderson (R)

==== Nevada ====
▌1. William M. Stewart (S)
▌3. John P. Jones (R)

==== New Hampshire ====
▌2. William E. Chandler (R)
▌3. Jacob H. Gallinger (R)

==== New Jersey ====
▌1. James Smith Jr. (D)
▌2. John R. McPherson (D)

==== New York ====
▌1. Edward Murphy Jr. (D)
▌3. David B. Hill (D)

==== North Carolina ====
▌2. Matt W. Ransom (D)
▌3. Zebulon B. Vance (D), until April 14, 1894

▌Thomas J. Jarvis (D), from April 19, 1894, until January 23, 1895
▌Jeter C. Pritchard (R), from January 23, 1895

==== North Dakota ====
▌1. William N. Roach (D)
▌3. Henry C. Hansbrough (R)

==== Ohio ====
▌1. John Sherman (R)
▌3. Calvin S. Brice (D)

==== Oregon ====
▌2. Joseph N. Dolph (R)
▌3. John H. Mitchell (R)

==== Pennsylvania ====
▌1. Matthew S. Quay (R)
▌3. J. Donald Cameron (R)

==== Rhode Island ====
▌1. Nelson W. Aldrich (R)
▌2. Nathan F. Dixon III (R)

==== South Carolina ====
▌2. Matthew C. Butler (D)
▌3. John L. M. Irby (D)

==== South Dakota ====
▌2. Richard F. Pettigrew (R)
▌3. James H. Kyle (P)

==== Tennessee ====
▌1. William B. Bate (D)
▌2. Isham G. Harris (D)

==== Texas ====
▌1. Roger Q. Mills (D)
▌2. Richard Coke (D)

==== Vermont ====
▌1. Redfield Proctor (R)
▌3. Justin S. Morrill (R)

==== Virginia ====
▌1. John W. Daniel (D)
▌2. Eppa Hunton, II (D)

==== Washington ====
▌1. John L. Wilson (R), from February 19, 1895
▌3. Watson C. Squire (R)

==== West Virginia ====
▌1. Charles J. Faulkner Jr. (D)
▌2. Johnson N. Camden (D)

==== Wisconsin ====
▌1. John L. Mitchell (D)
▌3. William F. Vilas (D)

==== Wyoming ====
▌1. Clarence D. Clark (R), from January 23, 1895
▌2. Joseph M. Carey (R)

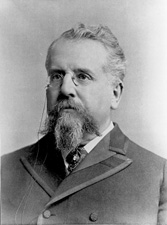
Senate President pro tempore Charles F. Manderson

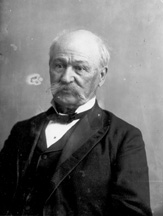
Senate President pro tempore Isham G. Harris

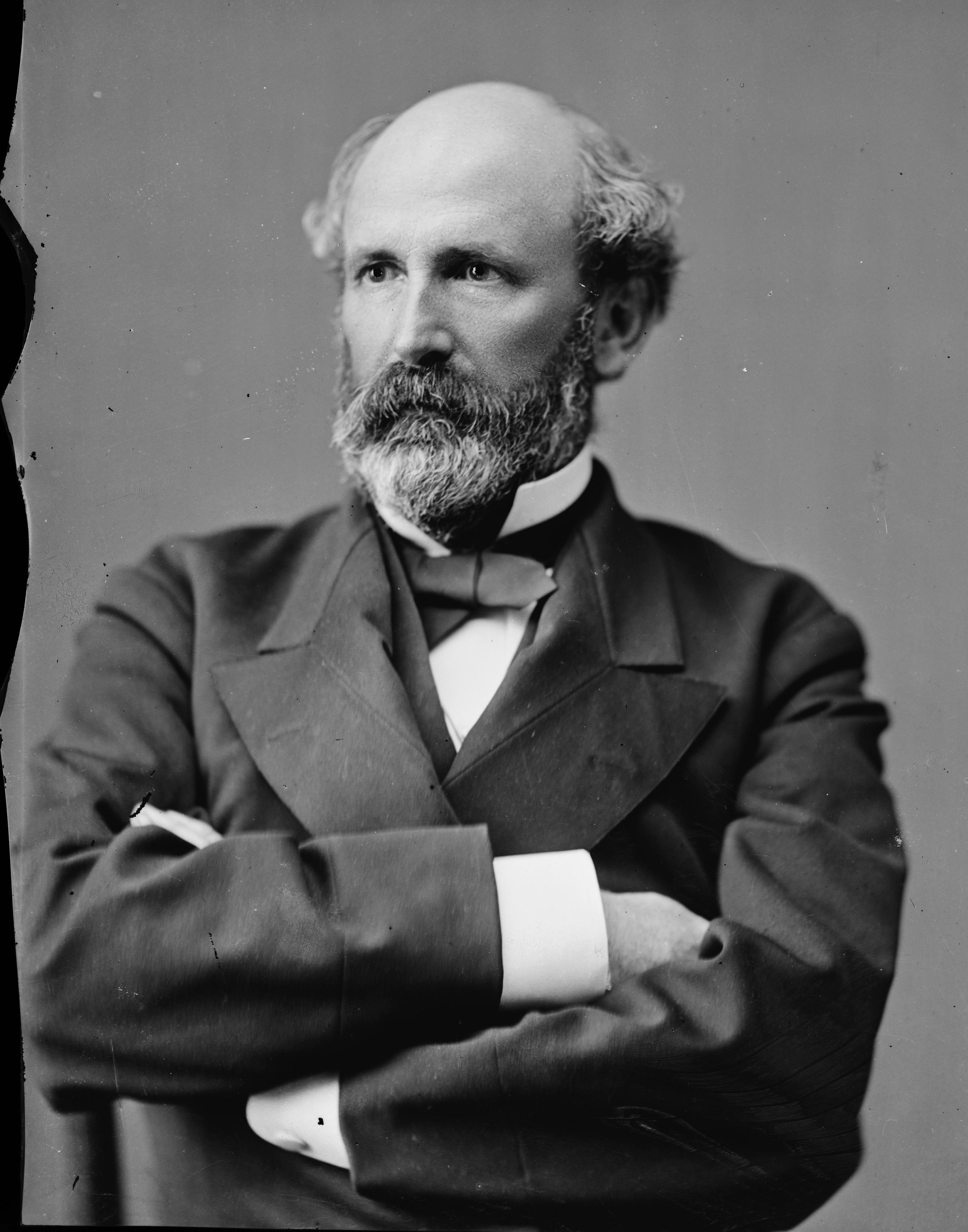
Senate President pro tempore Matt W. Ransom

Senators' party membership by state at the opening of the 53rd Congress in March 1893. The green stripes represent Populists, while the gray stripes in Nevada represent Silver Senator William M. Stewart. 2 Democrats 1 Democrat and 1 Republican 2 Republicans Territories

=== House of Representatives ===
==== Alabama ====
▌1. Richard H. Clarke (D)
▌2. Jesse F. Stallings (D)
▌3. William C. Oates (D), until November 5, 1894

▌George P. Harrison (D), from November 6, 1894

▌4. Gaston A. Robbins (D)
▌5. James E. Cobb (D)
▌6. John H. Bankhead (D)
▌7. William H. Denson (D)
▌8. Joseph Wheeler (D)
▌9. Louis W. Turpin (D)

==== Arkansas ====
▌1. Philip D. McCulloch Jr. (D)
▌2. Clifton R. Breckinridge (D), until August 14, 1894

▌John S. Little (D), from December 3, 1894

▌3. Thomas C. McRae (D)
▌4. William L. Terry (D)
▌5. Hugh A. Dinsmore (D)
▌6. Robert Neill (D)

==== California ====
▌1. Thomas J. Geary (D)
▌2. Anthony Caminetti (D)
▌3. Samuel G. Hilborn (R), until April 4, 1894

▌Warren B. English (D), from April 4, 1894

▌4. James G. Maguire (D)
▌5. Eugene F. Loud (R)
▌6. Marion Cannon (P)
▌7. William W. Bowers (R)

==== Colorado ====
▌1. Lafe Pence (P)
▌2. John C. Bell (P)

==== Connecticut ====
▌1. Lewis Sperry (D)
▌2. James P. Pigott (D)
▌3. Charles A. Russell (R)
▌4. Robert E. De Forest (D)

==== Delaware ====
▌At-large. John W. Causey (D)

==== Florida ====
▌1. Stephen R. Mallory (D)
▌2. Charles M. Cooper (D)

==== Georgia ====
▌1. Rufus E. Lester (D)
▌2. Benjamin E. Russell (D)
▌3. Charles F. Crisp (D)
▌4. Charles L. Moses (D)
▌5. Leonidas F. Livingston (D)
▌6. Thomas B. Cabaniss (D)
▌7. John W. Maddox (D)
▌8. Thomas G. Lawson (D)
▌9. Farish C. Tate (D)
▌10. James C. C. Black (D)
▌11. Henry G. Turner (D)

==== Idaho ====
▌At-large. Willis Sweet (R)

==== Illinois ====
▌1. J. Frank Aldrich (R)
▌2. Lawrence E. McGann (D)
▌3. Allan C. Durborow Jr. (D)
▌4. Julius Goldzier (D)
▌5. Albert J. Hopkins (R)
▌6. Robert R. Hitt (R)
▌7. Thomas J. Henderson (R)
▌8. Robert A. Childs (R)
▌9. Hamilton K. Wheeler (R)
▌10. Philip S. Post (R), until January 6, 1895
▌11. Benjamin F. Marsh (R)
▌12. John J. McDannold (D)
▌13. William M. Springer (D)
▌14. Benjamin F. Funk (R)
▌15. Joseph G. Cannon (R)
▌16. George W. Fithian (D)
▌17. Edward Lane (D)
▌18. William S. Forman (D)
▌19. James R. Williams (D)
▌20. George Washington Smith (R)
▌At-large. John C. Black (D), until January 12, 1895
▌At-large. Andrew J. Hunter (D)

==== Indiana ====
▌1. Arthur H. Taylor (D)
▌2. John L. Bretz (D)
▌3. Jason B. Brown (D)
▌4. William S. Holman (D)
▌5. George W. Cooper (D)
▌6. Henry U. Johnson (R)
▌7. William D. Bynum (D)
▌8. Elijah V. Brookshire (D)
▌9. Daniel W. Waugh (R)
▌10. Thomas Hammond (D)
▌11. Augustus N. Martin (D)
▌12. William F. McNagny (D)
▌13. Charles G. Conn (D)

==== Iowa ====
▌1. John H. Gear (R)
▌2. Walter I. Hayes (D)
▌3. David B. Henderson (R)
▌4. Thomas Updegraff (R)
▌5. Robert G. Cousins (R)
▌6. John F. Lacey (R)
▌7. John A. T. Hull (R)
▌8. William P. Hepburn (R)
▌9. Alva L. Hager (R)
▌10. Jonathan P. Dolliver (R)
▌11. George D. Perkins (R)

==== Kansas ====
▌1. Case Broderick (R)
▌2. Edward H. Funston (R), until August 2, 1894

▌Horace L. Moore (D), from August 2, 1894

▌3. Thomas J. Hudson (P)
▌4. Charles Curtis (R)
▌5. John Davis (P)
▌6. William Baker (P)
▌7. Jeremiah Simpson (P)
▌At-large. William A. Harris (P)

==== Kentucky ====
▌1. William J. Stone (D)
▌2. William T. Ellis (D)
▌3. Isaac H. Goodnight (D)
▌4. Alexander B. Montgomery (D)
▌5. Asher G. Caruth (D)
▌6. Albert S. Berry (D)
▌7. William C. P. Breckinridge (D)
▌8. James B. McCreary (D)
▌9. Thomas H. Paynter (D), until January 5, 1895
▌10. Marcus C. Lisle (D), until July 7, 1894

▌William M. Beckner (D), from December 3, 1894

▌11. Silas Adams (R)

==== Louisiana ====
▌1. Adolph Meyer (D)
▌2. Robert C. Davey (D)
▌3. Andrew Price (D)
▌4. Newton C. Blanchard (D), until March 12, 1894

▌Henry W. Ogden (D), from May 12, 1894

▌5. Charles J. Boatner (D)
▌6. Samuel M. Robertson (D)

==== Maine ====
▌1. Thomas B. Reed (R)
▌2. Nelson Dingley Jr. (R)
▌3. Seth L. Milliken (R)
▌4. Charles A. Boutelle (R)

==== Maryland ====
▌1. Robert F. Brattan (D), until May 10, 1894

▌W. Laird Henry (D), from November 6, 1894

▌2. J. Frederick C. Talbott (D)
▌3. Henry W. Rusk (D)
▌4. Isidor Rayner (D)
▌5. Barnes Compton (D), until May 15, 1894

▌Charles E. Coffin (R), from November 6, 1894

▌6. William M. McKaig (D)

==== Massachusetts ====
▌1. Ashley B. Wright (R)
▌2. Frederick H. Gillett (R)
▌3. Joseph H. Walker (R)
▌4. Lewis D. Apsley (R)
▌5. Moses T. Stevens (D)
▌6. William Cogswell (R)
▌7. William Everett (D), from April 25, 1893
▌8. Samuel W. McCall (R)
▌9. Joseph H. O'Neil (D)
▌10. Michael J. McEttrick (ID)
▌11. William F. Draper (R)
▌12. Elijah A. Morse (R)
▌13. Charles S. Randall (R)

==== Michigan ====
▌1. J. Logan Chipman (D), until August 17, 1893

▌Levi T. Griffin (D), from December 4, 1893

▌2. James S. Gorman (D)
▌3. Julius C. Burrows (R), until January 23, 1895
▌4. Henry F. Thomas (R)
▌5. George F. Richardson (D)
▌6. David D. Aitken (R)
▌7. Justin R. Whiting (D)
▌8. William S. Linton (R)
▌9. John W. Moon (R)
▌10. Thomas A. E. Weadock (D)
▌11. John Avery (R)
▌12. Samuel M. Stephenson (R)

==== Minnesota ====
▌1. James Albertus Tawney (R)
▌2. James T. McCleary (R)
▌3. Osee M. Hall (D)
▌4. Andrew R. Kiefer (R)
▌5. Loren Fletcher (R)
▌6. Melvin R. Baldwin (D)
▌7. Haldor E. Boen (P)

==== Mississippi ====
▌1. John M. Allen (D)
▌2. John C. Kyle (D)
▌3. Thomas C. Catchings (D)
▌4. Hernando D. Money (D)
▌5. John Sharp Williams (D)
▌6. Thomas R. Stockdale (D)
▌7. Charles E. Hooker (D)

==== Missouri ====
▌1. William H. Hatch (D)
▌2. Uriel S. Hall (D)
▌3. Alexander M. Dockery (D)
▌4. Daniel D. Burnes (D)
▌5. John C. Tarsney (D)
▌6. David A. De Armond (D)
▌7. John T. Heard (D)
▌8. Richard P. Bland (D)
▌9. James Beauchamp Clark (D)
▌10. Richard Bartholdt (R)
▌11. Charles F. Joy (R), until April 3, 1894

▌John J. O'Neill (D), from April 3, 1894

▌12. Seth W. Cobb (D)
▌13. Robert W. Fyan (D)
▌14. Marshall Arnold (D)
▌15. Charles H. Morgan (D)

==== Montana ====
▌At-large. Charles S. Hartman (R)

==== Nebraska ====
▌1. William J. Bryan (D)
▌2. David H. Mercer (R)
▌3. George D. Meiklejohn (R)
▌4. Eugene J. Hainer (R)
▌5. William A. McKeighan (P)
▌6. Omer M. Kem (P)

==== Nevada ====
▌At-large. Francis G. Newlands (D/S)

==== New Hampshire ====
▌1. Henry W. Blair (R)
▌2. Henry M. Baker (R)

==== New Jersey ====
▌1. Henry C. Loudenslager (R)
▌2. John J. Gardner (R)
▌3. Jacob A. Geissenhainer (D)
▌4. Johnston Cornish (D)
▌5. Cornelius A. Cadmus (D)
▌6. Thomas D. English (D)
▌7. George B. Fielder (D)
▌8. John T. Dunn (D)

==== New York ====
▌1. James W. Covert (D)
▌2. John M. Clancy (D)
▌3. Joseph C. Hendrix (D)
▌4. William J. Coombs (D)
▌5. John H. Graham (D)
▌6. Thomas F. Magner (D)
▌7. Franklin Bartlett (D)
▌8. Edward J. Dunphy (D)
▌9. Timothy J. Campbell (D)
▌10. Daniel Sickles (D)
▌11. Amos J. Cummings (D), until November 21, 1894
▌12. W. Bourke Cockran (D)
▌13. J. De Witt Warner (D)
▌14. John R. Fellows (D), until December 31, 1893

▌Lemuel E. Quigg (R), from January 30, 1894

▌15. Ashbel P. Fitch (D), until December 26, 1893

▌Isidor Straus (D), from January 30, 1894

▌16. William Ryan (D)
▌17. Francis Marvin (R)
▌18. Jacob LeFever (R)
▌19. Charles D. Haines (D)
▌20. Charles Tracey (D)
▌21. Simon J. Schermerhorn (D)
▌22. Newton M. Curtis (R)
▌23. John M. Wever (R)
▌24. Charles A. Chickering (R)
▌25. James S. Sherman (R)
▌26. George W. Ray (R)
▌27. James J. Belden (R)
▌28. Sereno E. Payne (R)
▌29. Charles W. Gillet (R)
▌30. James W. Wadsworth (R)
▌31. John Van Voorhis (R)
▌32. Daniel N. Lockwood (D)
▌33. Charles Daniels (R)
▌34. Warren B. Hooker (R)

==== North Carolina ====
▌1. William A. B. Branch (D)
▌2. Frederick A. Woodard (D)
▌3. Benjamin F. Grady (D)
▌4. Benjamin H. Bunn (D)
▌5. Thomas Settle III (R)
▌6. Sydenham B. Alexander (D)
▌7. John S. Henderson (D)
▌8. William H. Bower (D)
▌9. William T. Crawford (D)

==== North Dakota ====
▌At-large. Martin N. Johnson (R)

==== Ohio ====
▌1. Bellamy Storer (R)
▌2. John A. Caldwell (R), until May 4, 1894

▌Jacob H. Bromwell (R), from December 3, 1894

▌3. George W. Houk (D), until February 9, 1894

▌Paul J. Sorg (D), from May 21, 1894

▌4. Fernando C. Layton (D)
▌5. Dennis D. Donovan (D)
▌6. George W. Hulick (R)
▌7. George W. Wilson (R)
▌8. Luther M. Strong (R)
▌9. Byron F. Ritchie (D)
▌10. William H. Enochs (R), until July 13, 1893

▌Hezekiah S. Bundy (R), from December 4, 1893

▌11. Charles H. Grosvenor (R)
▌12. Joseph H. Outhwaite (D)
▌13. Darius D. Hare (D)
▌14. Michael D. Harter (D)
▌15. Henry C. Van Voorhis (R)
▌16. Albert J. Pearson (D)
▌17. James A. D. Richards (D)
▌18. George P. Ikirt (D)
▌19. Stephen A. Northway (R)
▌20. William J. White (R)
▌21. Tom L. Johnson (D)

==== Oregon ====
▌1. Binger Hermann (R)
▌2. William R. Ellis (R)

==== Pennsylvania ====
▌1. Henry H. Bingham (R)
▌2. Charles O'Neill (R), until November 25, 1893

▌Robert Adams Jr. (R), from December 19, 1893

▌3. William McAleer (D)
▌4. John E. Reyburn (R)
▌5. Alfred C. Harmer (R)
▌6. John B. Robinson (R)
▌7. Irving P. Wanger (R)
▌8. William Mutchler (D), until June 23, 1893

▌Howard Mutchler (D), from August 7, 1893

▌9. Constantine J. Erdman (D)
▌10. Marriott Brosius (R)
▌11. Joseph A. Scranton (R)
▌12. William H. Hines (D)
▌13. James B. Reilly (D)
▌14. Ephraim M. Woomer (R)
▌15. Myron B. Wright (R), until November 13, 1894

▌Edwin J. Jorden (R), from February 23, 1895

▌16. Albert C. Hopkins (R)
▌17. Simon P. Wolverton (D)
▌18. Thaddeus M. Mahon (R)
▌19. Frank E. Beltzhoover (D)
▌20. Josiah D. Hicks (R)
▌21. Daniel B. Heiner (R)
▌22. John Dalzell (R)
▌23. William A. Stone (R)
▌24. William A. Sipe (D)
▌25. Thomas W. Phillips (R)
▌26. Joseph C. Sibley (D)
▌27. Charles W. Stone (R)
▌28. George F. Kribbs (D)
▌At-large. Alexander McDowell (R)
▌At-large. William Lilly (R), until December 1, 1893

▌Galusha A. Grow (R), from February 26, 1894

==== Rhode Island ====
▌1. Oscar Lapham (D)
▌2. Charles H. Page (D), from April 5, 1893

==== South Carolina ====
▌1. William H. Brawley (D), until February 12, 1894

▌James F. Izlar (D), from April 12, 1894

▌2. William J. Talbert (D)
▌3. Asbury C. Latimer (D)
▌4. George W. Shell (D)
▌5. Thomas J. Strait (D)
▌6. John L. McLaurin (D)
▌7. George W. Murray (R)

==== South Dakota ====
Both representatives were elected at-large statewide on a general ticket.

▌At-large. William V. Lucas (R)
▌At-large. John A. Pickler (R)

==== Tennessee ====
▌1. Alfred A. Taylor (R)
▌2. John C. Houk (R)
▌3. Henry C. Snodgrass (D)
▌4. Benton McMillin (D)
▌5. James D. Richardson (D)
▌6. Joseph E. Washington (D)
▌7. Nicholas N. Cox (D)
▌8. Benjamin A. Enloe (D)
▌9. James C. McDearmon (D)
▌10. Josiah Patterson (D)

==== Texas ====
▌1. Joseph C. Hutcheson (D)
▌2. Samuel B. Cooper (D)
▌3. Constantine B. Kilgore (D)
▌4. David B. Culberson (D)
▌5. Joseph W. Bailey (D)
▌6. Joseph Abbott (D)
▌7. George C. Pendleton (D)
▌8. Charles K. Bell (D)
▌9. Joseph D. Sayers (D)
▌10. Walter Gresham (D)
▌11. William H. Crain (D)
▌12. Thomas M. Paschal (D)
▌13. Jeremiah V. Cockrell (D)

==== Vermont ====
▌1. H. Henry Powers (R)
▌2. William W. Grout (R)

==== Virginia ====
▌1. William A. Jones (D)
▌2. D. Gardiner Tyler (D)
▌3. George D. Wise (D)
▌4. James F. Epes (D)
▌5. Claude A. Swanson (D)
▌6. Paul C. Edmunds (D)
▌7. Charles T. O'Ferrall (D), until December 28, 1893

▌Smith S. Turner (D), from January 30, 1894

▌8. Elisha E. Meredith (D)
▌9. James W. Marshall (D)
▌10. Henry St. George Tucker III (D)

==== Washington ====
Both representatives were elected at-large statewide on a general ticket.

▌At-large. William H. Doolittle (R)
▌At-large. John L. Wilson (R), until February 18, 1895

==== West Virginia ====
▌1. John O. Pendleton (D)
▌2. William L. Wilson (D)
▌3. John D. Alderson (D)
▌4. James Capehart (D)

==== Wisconsin ====
▌1. Henry Allen Cooper (R)
▌2. Charles Barwig (D)
▌3. Joseph W. Babcock (R)
▌4. Peter J. Somers (D), from August 27, 1893
▌5. George H. Brickner (D)
▌6. Owen A. Wells (D)
▌7. George B. Shaw (R), until August 27, 1894

▌Michael Griffin (R), from November 5, 1894

▌8. Lyman E. Barnes (D)
▌9. Thomas Lynch (D)
▌10. Nils P. Haugen (R)

==== Wyoming ====
▌At-large. Henry A. Coffeen (D)

==== Delegates ====
▌Arizona Territory. Marcus A. Smith (D)
▌New Mexico Territory. Antonio Joseph (D)
▌Oklahoma Territory. Dennis T. Flynn (R)
▌Utah Territory. Joseph L. Rawlins (D)

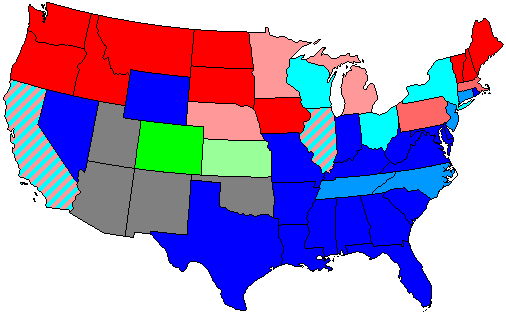
House seats by party holding plurality in state: 80+% Democratic / 80+% Republican; 60+% to 80% Democratic / 60+% to 80% Republican; Up to 60% Democratic / Up to 60% Republican

== Changes in membership ==
The count below reflects changes from the beginning of the first session of this Congress.

=== Senate ===
- Replacements: 6
  - Democratic: no net change
  - Republican: no net change
  - Liberal Republican: 1 seat net loss
- Deaths: 4
- Resignations: 8
- Interim appointments: 2
- Total seats with changes: 12

State (class)	Vacated by	Reason for vacancy	Subsequent	Date of successor's installation
Montana (1)	Vacant	Legislature had failed to elect. Successor elected January 16, 1895.	Lee Mantle (R)	January 16, 1895
Wyoming (1)	Vacant	Legislature had failed to elect. Successor was elected January 23, 1895.	Clarence D. Clark (R)	January 23, 1895
Washington (1)	Vacant	Legislature had failed to elect. John Allen was appointed to serve until March 20, 1893, but the Senate rejected his credentials. Successor elected February 1, 1895.	John L. Wilson (R)	February 19, 1895
California (3)	Leland Stanford (R)	Died June 21, 1893. Successor was appointed July 26, 1893, and elected January 23, 1895.	George C. Perkins (R)	July 26, 1893
Mississippi (2)	Edward C. Walthall (D)	Resigned January 24, 1894, due to ill health. Successor was elected.	Anselm J. McLaurin (D)	February 27, 1894
Louisiana (3)	Edward D. White (D)	Resigned March 12, 1894, to become Associate Justice of the U.S. Supreme Court. Successor was appointed March 12, 1894, and subsequently elected May 23, 1894.	Newton C. Blanchard (D)	March 12, 1894
Georgia (2)	Alfred H. Colquitt (D)	Died March 26, 1894. Successor was appointed April 2, 1894, and subsequently elected November 7, 1894.	Patrick Walsh (D)	April 2, 1894
North Carolina (3)	Zebulon B. Vance (D)	Died April 14, 1894. Successor was appointed.	Thomas J. Jarvis (D)	April 19, 1894
Michigan (1)	Francis B. Stockbridge (R)	Died April 30, 1894. Successor was appointed.	John Patton Jr. (R)	May 5, 1894
Michigan (1)	John Patton Jr. (R)	Successor was elected January 14, 1895.	Julius C. Burrows (R)	January 24, 1895
North Carolina (3)	Thomas J. Jarvis (D)	Successor was elected January 23, 1895.	Jeter C. Pritchard (R)	January 23, 1895

=== House of Representatives ===
- Replacements: 22
  - Democratic: 2 seat net gain
  - Republican: 2 seat net loss
- Deaths: 11
- Resignations: 13
- Contested election: 3
- Total seats with changes: 30

District	Vacated by	Reason for change	Successor	Date successor seated
Rhode Island 2nd	Vacant	Late run-off election.	Charles H. Page (D)	April 5, 1893
Massachusetts 7th	Vacant	Rep. Henry Cabot Lodge resigned during previous congress	William Everett (D)	April 25, 1893
Wisconsin 4th	Vacant	Elected to finish term of Rep. John L. Mitchell who resigned during previous congress	Peter J. Somers (D)	August 27, 1893
Pennsylvania 8th	William Mutchler (D)	Died June 23, 1893	Howard Mutchler (D)	August 7, 1893
Ohio 10th	William H. Enochs (R)	Died July 13, 1893	Hezekiah S. Bundy (R)	December 4, 1893
Michigan 1st	J. Logan Chipman (D)	Died August 17, 1893	Levi T. Griffin (D)	December 4, 1893
Pennsylvania 2nd	Charles O'Neill (R)	Died November 25, 1893	Robert Adams Jr. (R)	December 19, 1893
Pennsylvania At-large	William Lilly (R)	Died December 1, 1893	Galusha A. Grow (R)	February 26, 1894
New York 15th	Ashbel P. Fitch (D)	Resigned December 26, 1893, after becoming New York City Comptroller	Isidor Straus (D)	December 30, 1894
Virginia 7th	Charles T. O'Ferrall (D)	Resigned December 28, 1893, after being elected Governor of Virginia	Smith S. Turner (D)	January 30, 1894
New York 14th	John R. Fellows (D)	Resigned December 31, 1893, after becoming District Attorney of New York City	Lemuel E. Quigg (R)	January 30, 1894
Ohio 3rd	George W. Houk (D)	Died February 9, 1894	Paul J. Sorg (D)	May 21, 1894
South Carolina 1st	William H. Brawley (D)	Resigned February 12, 1894, after being appointed judge for the United States District Court for the District of South Carolina	James F. Izlar (D)	April 12, 1894
Louisiana 4th	Newton C. Blanchard (D)	Resigned March 12, 1894, after being appointed to the U.S. Senate	Henry W. Ogden (D)	December 3, 1894
Missouri 11th	Charles F. Joy (R)	Election was successfully challenged April 3, 1894	John J. O'Neill (D)	April 3, 1894
California 3rd	Samuel G. Hilborn (R)	Election was successfully challenged April 4, 1894	Warren B. English (D)	May 12, 1894
Ohio 2nd	John A. Caldwell (R)	Resigned April 4, 1894, after becoming Mayor of Cincinnati	Jacob H. Bromwell (R)	December 3, 1894
Maryland 1st	Robert F. Bratton (D)	Died May 10, 1894	W. Laird Henry (D)	November 6, 1894
Maryland 5th	Barnes Compton (D)	Resigned May 15, 1894, after being appointed as a naval officer	Charles E. Coffin (R)	November 6, 1894
Kentucky 10th	Marcus C. Lisle (D)	Died July 7, 1894	William M. Beckner (D)	December 3, 1894
Kansas 2nd	Edward H. Funston (R)	Election was successfully challenged August 2, 1894	Horace L. Moore (D)	August 2, 1894
Arkansas 2nd	Clifton R. Breckinridge (D)	Resigned August 14, 1894, after being appointed Minister to Russia	John S. Little (D)	December 3, 1894
Wisconsin 7th	George B. Shaw (R)	Died August 27, 1894	Michael Griffin (R)	November 5, 1894
Alabama 3rd	William C. Oates (D)	Resigned November 5, 1894, after being elected Governor of Alabama	George P. Harrison Jr. (D)	November 6, 1894
Pennsylvania 15th	Myron B. Wright (R)	Died November 13, 1894	Edwin J. Jorden (R)	February 23, 1895
New York 11th	Amos J. Cummings (D)	Resigned November 21, 1894	Vacant until next Congress	
Kentucky 9th	Thomas H. Paynter (D)	Resigned January 5, 1895, after being elected judge for the Kentucky Court of Appeals	Vacant until next Congress	
Illinois 10th	Philip S. Post (R)	Died January 6, 1895	Vacant until next Congress	
Illinois At-large	John C. Black (D)	Resigned January 12, 1895, to become United States District Court for the Northern District of Illinois	Vacant until next Congress	
Michigan 3rd	Julius C. Burrows (R)	Resigned January 23, 1895, after being elected to the U.S. Senate	Vacant until next Congress	
Washington At-large	John L. Wilson (R)	Resigned February 18, 1895, after being elected to the U.S. Senate	Vacant until next Congress	

== Committees ==
Lists of committees and their party leaders for members of the House and Senate committees can be found through the Official Congressional Directory at the bottom of this article. The directory after the pages of terms of service lists committees of the Senate, House (Standing with Subcommittees, Select and Special) and Joint and, after that, House/Senate committee assignments. On the committees section of the House and Senate in the Official Congressional Directory, the committee's members on the first row on the left side shows the chairman of the committee and on the right side shows the ranking member of the committee.

=== Senate ===
- Additional Accommodations for the Library of Congress (Select) (Chairman: Justin S. Morrill; Ranking Member: Matthew C. Butler)
- Agriculture and Forestry (Chairman: James Z. George; Ranking Member: James McMillan)
- Appropriations (Chairman: Francis M. Cockrell; Ranking Member: William B. Allison)
- Audit and Control the Contingent Expenses of the Senate (Chairman: Johnson N. Camden; Ranking Member: John P. Jones)
- Bribery Attempts Investigation (Special)
- Canadian Relations (Chairman: Edward Murphy Jr.; Ranking Member: George F. Hoar)
- Census (Chairman: David Turpie; Ranking Member: John P. Jones)
- Civil Service and Retrenchment (Chairman: Thomas J. Jarvis; Ranking Member: N/A)
- Claims (Chairman: Samuel Pasco; Ranking Member: John H. Mitchell)
- Coast Defenses (Chairman: John B. Gordon; Ranking Member: Watson C. Squire)
- Commerce (Chairman: Matt W. Ransom; Ranking Member: William P. Frye)
- Corporations Organized in the District of Columbia (Select) (Chairman: Nelson W. Aldrich)
- Distributing Public Revenue Among the States (Select)
- District of Columbia (Chairman: Isham G. Harris; Ranking Member: James McMillan)
- Education and Labor (Chairman: James H. Kyle; Ranking Member: Joseph M. Carey)
- Engrossed Bills (Chairman: William B. Allison; Ranking Member: John Martin)
- Enrolled Bills (Chairman: Donelson Caffery; Ranking Member: Fred T. Dubois)
- Epidemic Diseases (Chairman: John P. Jones; Ranking Member: Isham G. Harris)
- Establish a University in the United States (Select) (Chairman: Eppa Hunton; Ranking Member: Redfield Proctor)
- Examine the Several Branches in the Civil Service (Chairman: William A. Peffer; Ranking Member: Thomas C. Power)
- Finance (Chairman: Daniel W. Voorhees; Ranking Member: Justin S. Morrill)
- Fisheries (Chairman: Richard Coke; Ranking Member: Francis B. Stockbridge)
- Five Civilized Tribes of Indians (Select) (Chairman: Henry M. Teller; Ranking Member: Samuel Pasco)
- Ford Theater Disaster (Select) (Chairman: Isham G. Harris)
- Foreign Relations (Chairman: John Tyler Morgan; Ranking Member: John Sherman)
- Forest Reservations (Select) (Chairman: William V. Allen; Ranking Member: Henry M. Teller)
- Geological Survey (Select) (Chairman: Anselm J. McLaurin; Ranking Member: Edward O. Wolcott)
- Immigration (Chairman: David B. Hill; Ranking Member: William E. Chandler)
- Indian Affairs (Chairman: James K. Jones; Ranking Member: Orville H. Platt)
- Indian Depredations (Chairman: William Lindsay; Ranking Member: George L. Shoup)
- Interstate Commerce (Chairman: Matthew C. Butler; Ranking Member: Shelby M. Cullom)
- Irrigation and Reclamation of Arid Lands (Chairman: Stephen M. White; Ranking Member: William M. Stewart)
- Judiciary (Chairman: James L. Pugh; Ranking Member: George Frisbie Hoar)
- Library (Chairman: Roger Q. Mills; Ranking Member: Edward O. Wolcott)
- Manufactures (Chairman: Charles H. Gibson; Ranking Member: Anthony Higgins)
- Military Affairs (Chairman: William B. Bate; Ranking Member: Joseph R. Hawley)
- Mines and Mining (Chairman: William M. Stewart; Ranking Member: John P. Jones)
- Mississippi River and its Tributaries (Select) (Chairman: Newton C. Blanchard; Ranking Member: William D. Washburn)
- National Banks (Select) (Chairman: John L. Mitchell; Ranking Member: J. Donald Cameron)
- Naval Affairs (Chairman: John R. McPherson; Ranking Member: J. Donald Cameron)
- Nicaraguan Claims (Select)
- Organization, Conduct and Expeditures of Executive Departments (Chairman: James Smith Jr.; Ranking Member: James F. Wilson)
- Pacific Railroads (Chairman: Calvin S. Brice; Ranking Member: Cushman K. Davis)
- Patents (Chairman: Wilkinson Call; Ranking Member: Nathan F. Dixon)
- Pensions (Chairman: John M. Palmer; Ranking Member: George L. Shoup)
- Post Office and Post Roads (Chairman: William F. Vilas; Ranking Member: John H. Mitchell)
- Potomac River Front (Select) (Chairman: John R. McPherson)
- Printing (Chairman: Arthur P. Gorman; Ranking Member: Charles F. Manderson)
- Private Land Claims (Chairman: Eugene Hale; Ranking Member: Alfred H. Colquitt)
- Privileges and Elections (Chairman: George Gray; Ranking Member: George F. Hoar)
- Public Buildings and Grounds (Chairman: George G. Vest; Ranking Member: N/A)
- Public Distress (Select)
- Public Lands (Chairman: James H. Berry; Ranking Member: Joseph N. Dolph)
- Quadrocentennial (Select) (Chairman: Patrick Walsh; Ranking Member: William Lindsay)
- Railroads (Chairman: John Martin; Ranking Member: Joseph R. Hawley)
- Revision of the Laws (Chairman: John W. Daniel; Ranking Member: James F. Wilson)
- Revolutionary Claims (Chairman: J. Donald Cameron; Ranking Member: Richard Coke)
- Rules (Chairman: Joseph C.S. Blackburn; Ranking Member: Nelson W. Aldrich)
- Tariff Regulation (Select)
- Territories (Chairman: Charles J. Faulkner; Ranking Member: Orville H. Platt)
- Transportation and Sale of Meat Products (Select) (Chairman: Orville H. Platt; Ranking Member: Jacob H. Gallinger)
- Transportation Routes to the Seaboard (Chairman: John L.M. Irby; Ranking Member: Jacob H. Gallinger)
- United States Senate Committee on Trespassers upon Indian Lands (Chairman: William N. Roach; Ranking Member: Anthony Higgins)
- Whole
- Woman Suffrage (Select) (Chairman: George F. Hoar; Ranking Member: James Z. George)

=== House of Representatives ===
- Accounts (Chairman: Harry Welles Rusk; Ranking Member: Owen A. Wells)
- Agriculture (Chairman: William H. Hatch; Ranking Member: John S. Williams)
- Alcoholic Liquor Traffic (Select) (Chairman: Thomas Dunn English; Ranking Member: Michael J. McEttrick)
- Appropriations (Chairman: Joseph D. Sayers; Ranking Member: David B. Henderson)
- Banking and Currency (Chairman: William M. Springer; Ranking Member: James R. Williams)
- Claims (Chairman: Benjamin H. Bunn; Ranking Member: Thomas Hammond)
- Coinage, Weights and Measures (Chairman: Richard P. Bland; Ranking Member: Henry A. Coffeen)
- Disposition of Executive Papers (Chairman: John S. Henderson; Ranking Member: John A. Caldwell)
- District of Columbia (Chairman: John T. Heard; Ranking Member: Charles M. Cooper)
- Education (Chairman: Benjamin A. Enloe; Ranking Member: Charles D. Haines)
- Election of the President, Vice President and Representatives in Congress (Chairman: Henry St. George Tucker; Ranking Member: Jesse F. Stallings)
- Elections (Chairman: Jason B. Brown; Ranking Member: Frederick A. Woodard)
- Enrolled Bills (Chairman: Albert J. Pearson; Ranking Member: Alva L. Hager)
- Expenditures in the Agriculture Department (Chairman: Paul C. Edmunds; Ranking Member: Omer Madison Kem)
- Expenditures in the Interior Department (Chairman: Henry G. Turner; Ranking Member: William W. Grout)
- Expenditures in the Justice Department (Chairman: Richard D. Dunphy; Ranking Member: Byron F. Ritchie)
- Expenditures in the Navy Department (Chairman: Benton McMillin; Ranking Member: Seth L. Milliken)
- Expenditures in the Post Office Department (Chairman: James A.D. Richards; Ranking Member: Ashley B. Wright)
- Expenditures in the State Department (Chairman: Rufus E. Lester; Ranking Member: Charles W. Stone)
- Expenditures in the Treasury Department (Chairman: Charles Barwig; Ranking Member: William A. Stone)
- Expenditures in the War Department (Chairman: Alexander B. Montgomery; Ranking Member: Robert R. Hitt)
- Expenditures on Public Buildings (Chairman: William H. Crain; Ranking Member: John W. Moon)
- Foreign Affairs (Chairman: James B. McCreary; Ranking Member: William Everett)
- Immigration and Naturalization (Chairman: Jacob A. Geissenhainer; Ranking Member: James G. Maguire)
- Irrigation of Arid Lands (Chairman: George W. Cooper; Ranking Member: Francis G. Newlands)
- Indian Affairs (Chairman: William S. Holman; Ranking Member: William H. Bower)
- Interstate and Foreign Commerce (Chairman: George D. Wise; Ranking Member: William H. Brawley)
- Invalid Pensions (Chairman: Augustus N. Martin; Ranking Member: George B. Fielder)
- Judiciary (Chairman: David B. Culberson; Ranking Member: Joseph W. Bailey)
- Labor (Chairman: Lawrence E. McGann; Ranking Member: Lafe Pence)
- Levees and Improvements of the Mississippi River (Chairman: John M. Allen; Ranking Member: Frederick A. Woodard)
- Library (Chairman: Franklin Bartlett; Ranking Member: Charles O'Neill)
- Manufactures (Chairman: Charles H. Page; Ranking Member: Johnston Cornish)
- Merchant Marine and Fisheries (Chairman: George W. Fithian; Ranking Member: Johnston Cornish)
- Mileage (Chairman: Thomas Lynch; Ranking Member: George C. Pendleton)
- Military Affairs (Chairman: Joseph H. Outhwaite; Ranking Member: Charles H. Morgan)
- Militia (Chairman: Adolph Meyer; Ranking Member: John C. Bell)
- Mines and Mining (Chairman: Thomas A.E. Weadock; Ranking Member: William A. Baker)
- Naval Affairs (Chairman: Jacob A. Geissenhainer; Ranking Member: D. Gardiner Tyler)
- Pacific Railroads (Chairman: James B. Reilly; Ranking Member: Joseph C. Hendrix)
- Patents (Chairman: James W. Covert; Ranking Member: Robert Neill)
- Pensions (Chairman: Charles L. Moses; Ranking Member: Champ Clark)
- Post Office and Post Roads (Chairman: John S. Henderson; Ranking Member: Claude A. Swanson)
- Printing (Chairman: James D. Richardson; Ranking Member: Case Broderick)
- Private Land Claims (Chairman: John O. Pendleton; Ranking Member: Thomas J. Hudson)
- Public Buildings and Grounds (Chairman: John H. Bankhead; Ranking Member: Robert C. Davey)
- Public Lands (Chairman: Thomas Chipman McRae; Ranking Member: Asbury C. Latimer)
- Railways and Canals (Chairman: Seth W. Cobb; Ranking Member: Marion Cannon)
- Reform in the Civil Service (Chairman: Robert E. De Forest; Ranking Member: Arthur H. Taylor)
- Revision of Laws (Chairman: William T. Ellis; Ranking Member: John W. Maddox)
- Rivers and Harbors (Chairman: Thomas C. Catchings; Ranking Member: Philip D. McCulloch)
- Rules (Chairman: Charles F. Crisp; Ranking Member: Thomas B. Reed)
- Standards of Official Conduct
- Territories (Chairman: Joseph Wheeler; Ranking Member: Haldor E. Boen)
- Ventilation and Acoustics (Chairman: George W. Shell; Ranking Member: Joseph H. Walker)
- War Claims (Chairman: Frank E. Beltzhoover; Ranking Member: Byron F. Ritchie)
- Ways and Means (Chairman: William L. Wilson; Ranking Member: Thomas B. Reed)
- Whole

=== Joint committees ===
- Celebrate the Centennial of the Laying of the Capitol Cornerstone
- Conditions of Indian Tribes (Special)
- Dedication of Chickamauga and Chattanooga National Military Park
- Disposition of (Useless) Executive Papers
- Ford's Theater Disaster
- The Library
- Printing
- Naval Affairs
- Naval Personnel

== Caucuses ==
- Democratic (House)
- Democratic (Senate)

== Employees ==
=== Legislative branch agency directors ===
- Architect of the Capitol: Edward Clark
- Librarian of Congress: Ainsworth Rand Spofford
- Public Printer of the United States: Francis W. Palmer, until 1894
  - Thomas E. Benedict, from 1894

=== Senate ===
- Chaplain of the Senate: William H. Millburn (Methodist)
- Secretary of the Senate: Anson G. McCook, until April 6, 1893
  - William Ruffin Cox, elected April 6, 1893
- Librarian of the Senate: Alonzo M. Church
- Sergeant at Arms of the Senate: Edward K. Valentine, until August 8, 1893
  - Richard J. Bright, elected August 8, 1893

=== House of Representatives ===
- Chaplain of the House: Samuel W. Haddaway (Methodist), elected August 7, 1893
  - Edward B. Bagby (Christian), elected December 4, 1893
- Clerk of the House: James Kerr
- Doorkeeper of the House: Alvin B. Hurt, elected August 7, 1893
- Postmaster of the House: Lycurgus Dalton, elected August 7, 1893
- Reading Clerks: Thomas S. Pettit (D) and Neill S. Brown Jr. (R)
- Clerk at the Speaker's Table: Charles R. Crisp
- Sergeant at Arms of the House: Samuel S. Yoder, until August 7, 1893
  - Herman W. Snow, from August 7, 1893

== See also ==
- 1892 United States elections (elections leading to this Congress)
  - 1892 United States presidential election
  - 1892–93 United States Senate elections
  - 1892 United States House of Representatives elections
- 1894 United States elections (elections during this Congress, leading to the next Congress)
  - 1894–95 United States Senate elections
  - 1894 United States House of Representatives elections
