= 1819 Maryland gubernatorial election =

- December 13, 1819
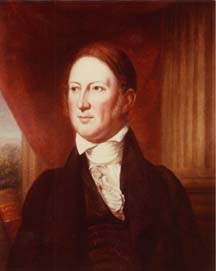

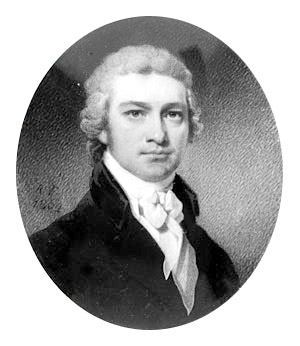
Nominee	Samuel Sprigg	Charles Goldsborough
Party	Democratic-Republican	Federalist
Popular vote	49	36
Percentage	57.65%	42.35%
Governor before election
Charles Goldsborough
Federalist
Elected Governor
Samuel Sprigg
Democratic-Republican

The 1819 Maryland gubernatorial election was held on December 13, 1819, in order to elect the Governor of Maryland. Democratic-Republican nominee Samuel Sprigg was elected by the Maryland General Assembly against incumbent Federalist Governor Charles Goldsborough.

== General election ==
On election day, December 13, 1819, Democratic-Republican nominee Samuel Sprigg was elected by the Maryland General Assembly, thereby gaining Democratic-Republican control over the office of governor. Sprigg was sworn in as the 17th Governor of Maryland on December 20, 1819.

=== Results ===
Maryland gubernatorial election, 1819
Party	Candidate	Votes	%
Democratic-Republican	Samuel Sprigg	49	57.65
Federalist	Charles Goldsborough (incumbent)	36	42.35
Total votes		85	100.00
Democratic-Republican gain from Federalist			
