= Chris Bratton =

Chris Bratton may refer to:

- Christopher Bratton (born c. 1960), former president of School of the Museum of Fine Arts, Boston
- Chris Bratton (drummer) (born 1969), American drummer involved in the hardcore punk scene
