= Compton (Trappe, Maryland) =

Historic house in Maryland, US

- U.S. National Register of Historic Places
- Location within Maryland Location within the United States
- Location: Howell Point Road; Trappe, Maryland
- Coordinates: 38°38′27″N 76°6′25″W
- Area: 57 acres (23 ha)
- Built: 1794
- NRHP reference No.: 74000970
- Added to NRHP: July 25, 1974

Compton is a historic home in Trappe, Talbot County, Maryland. It is a two-part Flemish bond brick dwelling, which is the result of two major building periods and subsequent minor alterations. The main part is five bays long with a three-brick belt course between floors. The second part is a 1 1/2-story kitchen / dining room wing. Also on the property is a two-story brick milkhouse. It was home to Maryland's 18th Governor Samuel Stevens, who expanded the building to its present configuration.

It was listed on the National Register of Historic Places in 1974.
