= Thomas Bayly (Maryland politician) =

American politician

Thomas Bayly (September 13, 1775 – 1829) was a slave owner and U.S. Congressman from the eighth district of Maryland, serving from 1817 to 1823.

Born at the Wellington estate near Quantico, Maryland, Bayly attended private schools and later graduated from Princeton College in 1797. He studied law, was admitted to the bar, and practiced in Somerset and Worcester Counties, Maryland.

Bayly served as a member of the Maryland House of Delegates from 1804 to 1814. He was elected as a Federalist to the Fifteenth Congress and reelected to the Sixteenth and Seventeenth congresses, serving from March 4, 1817, to March 3, 1823. He resumed the practice of law afterwards, and died at his home, Wellington in 1829. He is interred in the family cemetery on the grounds of his estate.

U.S. House of Representatives
Preceded by Charles Goldsborough	Member of the U.S. House of Representatives from Maryland's 8th congressional district 1817–1823	Succeeded by John S. Spence
