= Joseph Kent =

American politician and planter (1779–1837)

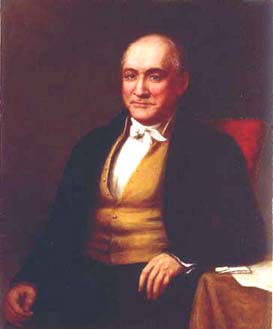

United States Senator from Maryland
- In office March 4, 1833 – November 24, 1837
- Preceded by: Samuel Smith
- Succeeded by: William D. Merrick

19th Governor of Maryland
- In office January 9, 1826 – January 15, 1829
- Preceded by: Samuel Stevens, Jr.
- Succeeded by: Daniel Martin

Member of the U.S. House of Representatives from Maryland's 2nd district
- In office March 4, 1811 – March 3, 1815
- Preceded by: Archibald Van Horne
- Succeeded by: John Carlyle Herbert
- In office March 4, 1819 – January 6, 1826
- Preceded by: John Carlyle Herbert
- Succeeded by: John Crompton Weems

Personal details
- Born: January 14, 1779 Calvert County, Maryland
- Died: November 24, 1837 (aged 58) Bladensburg, Maryland
- Party: Whig

Joseph Kent (January 14, 1779 – November 24, 1837) was an American politician and planter who was a United States senator from Maryland, serving from 1833 until his death in 1837. He also served in the House of Representatives, representing the 2nd congressional district of Maryland from 1811 to 1815 and again from 1819 to 1826, and as the 19th governor of Maryland from 1826 to 1829.

== Early life and career ==
Born on January 14, 1779, in Calvert County, Maryland. He was the son of Daniel Kent, Sr. (1754–1805) and Anne Weems Wheeler (1761–1823). Joseph Kent received a liberal schooling at Lower Marlboro Academy, and studied medicine. He was admitted to medical practice in Lower Marlborough, Calvert County in 1799 with a Doctor Parran, but ceased relations with Parran after a political disagreement in 1801.

== First marriage ==
Joseph married first, Eleanor Lee Contee Wallace (1782–1826) on October 30, 1804. Eleanor was born December 9, 1782, in Prince George's County, Maryland. She died August 14, 1826. Eleanor was the daughter Dr. Michael Wallace, Jr., Esq. (1749–1794) and Eleanor Lee Contee (1758–1786). Their daughter, Adelaide MacKubin Kent, would marry Thomas Pratt, another Governor of Maryland and U.S. Senator.

== Farming and medicine ==
Kent purchased a 300-acre (1.2 km^{2}) slave plantation named "Rosemount" near Bladensburg, Maryland, and settled there around 1807. "Rosemount" is part of the large estate, "Park Hall", owned by the Gantt family in 1735, about which time it was divided and sold. Joseph gave the name "Rosemount". He was passionately fond of roses and the old terraced garden was kept profusely planted with lilies and roses, justifying his choice of the new name he had given his home.

He continued the practice of medicine and also engaged in farming on his estate. In 1807, Dr. Kent removed to the vicinity of Bladensburg and entered the Maryland State Militia as a Surgeon's mate, in the 34th Regiment of the Maryland Militia. In 1809, he was made a full surgeon, but resigned. In the militia, Kent received the rank of a Lieutenant Colonel, and finally as a Colonel of the Cavalry of the 2nd Maryland Militia Cavalry.

Joseph presided at the first public meeting in Washington for the organization of the Chesapeake and Ohio Canal, in which he became a director.

== Politics ==
Turning to politics, Joseph was elected to the United States Congress in 1810 taking his seat on March 4, 1811, and served several years until March 3, 1815. Though a Federalist, opposing War with Great Britain, he voted with the Republican party in declaring War. He was a Presidential Elector in 1816, casting his vote for James Monroe (1758–1831). He later broke with the Federalist party and by the time of the next election he was a Democratic-Republican, in which he was elected to another term in the House of Representatives from March 4, 1819, until he resigned on January 6, 1826. In his second tenure in Congress, Kent continued as chairman of the Committee on the District of Columbia.

== Governor of Maryland ==
Joseph was elected Governor of Maryland in 1826. The primary goal of Kent's administration as governor was to work toward internal improvements. He was in support of improving internal transportation, including expanding the Chesapeake and Ohio Canal and the Baltimore and Ohio Railroad. The immense cost of these projects, however, were never fully repudiated until several decades after Kent's administration, and placed the state under immense financial burden for many years afterwards.

Other areas of interest for Kent included prison reform, separating presidential voting into districts, and for increased funding for schools and colleges. He also sought to improve the maintenance of the state's records, "so indispensably necessary to its correct history" as he said.

== Second marriage ==
Joseph married Alice Lee Contee (1803–1868) on July 8, 1828, at "Bromont", near Newburg, Charles Co., Maryland. Alice was born at "Bromont", near Newburg, Charles Co., Maryland. She died August 24, 1868. Alice was the a first cousin of Joseph's first wife, Eleanor Lee Contee Wallace (1782–1826). Alice was the daughter of Capt. Benjamin Contee, Rev., Hon. (1755–1815) and Sarah Russell Lee (1766–1810).

== United States Senate and later life ==
Kent was elected as a Republican (later Whig) to the United States Senate and served from March 4, 1833, until his death at his home, "Rosemount," near Bladensburg. He served as chairman of the Senate Committee on the District of Columbia (Twenty-fourth and Twenty-fifth Congresses). As senator, Kent was opposed to the Bank of the United States, and offered a resolution asking for negotiations with France regarding lower tobacco prices and restricting the importing of tobacco. However, although this resolution passed, it was not widely popular.

Due to ill health, Kent attended only four sessions of the Senate, and died in 1837 as a result of a fall from his horse. He is buried in an unmarked grave at his home of "Rosemount".

== See also ==
- List of members of the United States Congress who died in office (1790–1899)

U.S. House of Representatives
Preceded by Archibald Van Horne	Member of the U.S. House of Representatives from Maryland's 2nd congressional district 1811–1815	Succeeded by John C. Herbert
Preceded by John C. Herbert	Member of the U.S. House of Representatives from Maryland's 2nd congressional district 1819–1826	Succeeded by John C. Weems
Political offices
Preceded by Samuel Stevens, Jr.	Governor of Maryland; 1826–1829	Succeeded by Daniel Martin
U.S. Senate
Preceded by Samuel Smith	U.S. senator (Class 1) from Maryland; 1833–1837; Served alongside: Ezekiel F. Chambers, Robert H. Goldsborough, John S. Spence	Succeeded by William D. Merrick
