= Robert Bratton =

Robert or Bob Bratton may refer to:

- Robert Bratton (sound editor) (1918–2008), American sound editor
- Robert Bratton, JP chairman, see 1954 Birthday Honours
- Bob Bratton (banker), see First Charter Bank
- Bob Bratton, sheriff, see Carty Finkbeiner

== See also ==
- Robert F. Brattan (1845–1894), American politician
