= John S. Spence =

American politician (1788–1840)

John Selby Spence

United States Senator from Maryland
- In office December 31, 1836 – October 24, 1840
- Preceded by: Robert H. Goldsborough
- Succeeded by: John L. Kerr

Member of the U.S. House of Representatives from Maryland's 8th district
- In office March 4, 1823 – March 3, 1825
- Preceded by: Thomas Bayly
- Succeeded by: Robert N. Martin
- In office March 4, 1831 – March 3, 1833
- Preceded by: Ephraim King Wilson
- Succeeded by: John T. Stoddert

Member of the Maryland Senate

Member of the Maryland House of Delegates

Personal details
- Born: February 29, 1788 Snow Hill, Maryland
- Died: October 24, 1840 (aged 52) Berlin, Maryland
- Party: Whig

John Selby Spence (February 29, 1788 – October 24, 1840) was an American politician.

Born near Snow Hill, Maryland, Spence attended the common schools and graduated from the medical department of the University of Pennsylvania at Philadelphia in 1809 and practiced in Worcester County, Maryland. Spence served as a member of both the Maryland House of Delegates and as a member of the Maryland State Senate. In 1822, Spence was elected to the Eighteenth Congress, and served from March 4, 1823, to March 3, 1825. He was again elected as an Anti-Jacksonian in 1830 to the Twenty-second Congress, and served from March 4, 1831, to March 3, 1833.

In 1836, Spence was elected as an Anti-Jacksonian (later Whig) to the United States Senate to fill the vacancy caused by the death of Robert H. Goldsborough. He was reelected in 1837, and served from December 31, 1836, until his death near Berlin, Maryland, in 1840. He is interred in the Episcopal Churchyard.

== See also ==
- List of members of the United States Congress who died in office (1790–1899)

U.S. House of Representatives
| Preceded by Thomas Bayly | Member of the U.S. House of Representatives from Maryland's 8th congressional district 1823–1825 | Succeeded by Robert N. Martin |
| Preceded by Ephraim King Wilson | Member of the U.S. House of Representatives from Maryland's 8th congressional district 1831–1833 | Succeeded by John Truman Stoddert |
U.S. Senate
| Preceded by Robert H. Goldsborough | U.S. senator (Class 3) from Maryland; 1836–1840; Served alongside: Joseph Kent, William D. Merrick | Succeeded by John Leeds Kerr |
