= Winder Laird Henry =

American politician and judge (1864–1940)

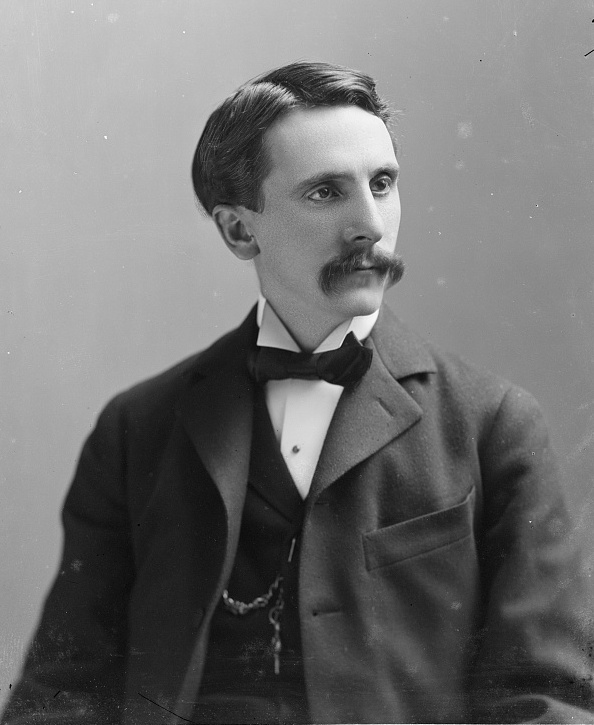
- Henry, c. 1894–1901

Member of the U.S. House of Representatives from Maryland's 1st district
- In office 1894–1895
- Preceded by: Robert Franklin Brattan
- Succeeded by: Joshua Weldon Miles

Personal details
- Born: December 20, 1864 Cambridge, Maryland, U.S.
- Died: July 5, 1940 (aged 75) Cambridge, Maryland, U.S.
- Resting place: Christ Church Cemetery; Cambridge, Maryland, U.S.
- Parent: Daniel Maynadier Henry (father)
- Relatives: Charles Goldsborough (great-grandfather); Robert Henry Goldsborough (great-grandfather)

Winder Laird Henry (December 20, 1864 – July 5, 1940) was an American politician and judge from Maryland. He served as a member of the U.S. House of Representatives from 1894 to 1895.

== Early life ==
Henry was born on December 20, 1864, at Hambrooks near Cambridge, Maryland, and attended the public schools as a youth. He engaged in mercantile pursuits and purchased an interest in and became editor of the Cambridge Chronicle.

== Career ==
He was elected as a Democrat to the Fifty-third Congress to fill the vacancy caused by the death of Robert Franklin Brattan and served from November 6, 1894, to March 3, 1895, but was not a candidate for renomination in 1894.

After Congress, Henry resumed newspaper work until 1898, at which point he commenced the study of law. He was admitted to the bar of Dorchester County, Maryland in 1898 and engaged in practice in Cambridge. He served as colonel on the staff of Gov. John Walter Smith from 1899 to 1903 and was commissioner of the land office of Maryland April 1, 1908 to May 1, 1908. He was appointed chief judge of the first judicial circuit in May 1908 and served until October 1, 1909, when he resumed the practice of law in Cambridge. He also engaged in banking and was a member of the Maryland Public Service Commission from August 1, 1914 to June 1, 1916.

== Personal life ==
Henry was the great-grandson of Charles Goldsborough and Robert Henry Goldsborough, and the son of Daniel Maynadier Henry.

Henry died on July 5, 1940, in Cambridge, and is interred in Christ Church Cemetery.

U.S. House of Representatives
Preceded by Robert Franklin Brattan	Member of the U.S. House of Representatives from Maryland's 1st congressional district 1894–1895	Succeeded by Joshua Weldon Miles
