= Marcus C. Lisle =

American politician

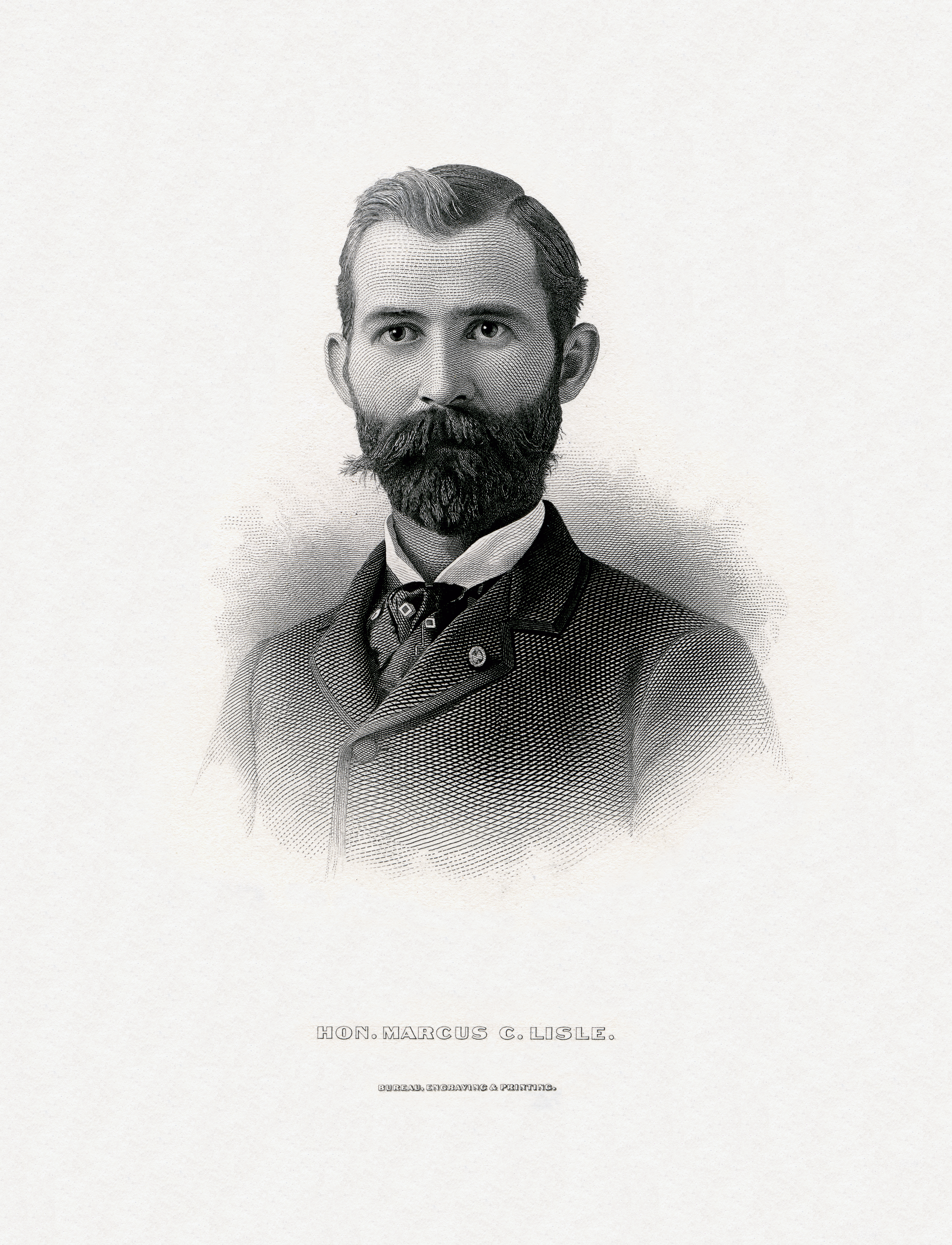

Member of the U.S. House of Representatives from Kentucky's 10th district
- In office March 4, 1893 – July 7, 1894
- Preceded by: Joseph M. Kendall
- Succeeded by: William M. Beckner

Personal details
- Born: Marcus Claiborne Lisle; September 23, 1862 near Winchester
- Died: July 7, 1894 (aged 31)
- Resting place: Winchester Cemetery
- Party: Democratic
- Spouse: Elizabeth "Lizzie" Buckner Bean (1866–1893)
- Children: Ernest Claiborne Lisle (1888–1917); Infant son (1893–1893)
- Parents: Claiborne Lisle (1820–1910); Esther Wilson Hampton (1821–1877)
- Education: Columbia Law School

Marcus Claiborne Lisle (September 23, 1862 – July 7, 1894) was an American lawyer, judge and politician from Kentucky who served as a member of the United States House of Representatives from 1893 until his death the following year.

== Early life and career ==
Born near Winchester, Kentucky, Lisle attended the common schools of his native county and the University of Kentucky at Lexington. He graduated from Columbia Law School, New York City, and was admitted to the bar and commenced legal practice in Winchester, Kentucky, in 1887. He later served as county judge of Clark County, Kentucky, in 1890.

== Congress ==
Lisle was elected as a Democrat to the Fifty-third Congress and served from March 4, 1893, until his death in Winchester, Kentucky, July 7, 1894, of "complication of consumption and Bright's disease".

== Personal life ==
Lisle married Elizabeth "Lizzie" Buckner Bean at the Presbyterian Church, Winchester, Kentucky, on April 27, 1887. The first child born to this marriage was Ernest Claiborne Lisle. On March 17, 1893, the infant son of Judge Lisle died and was buried beside the body of his mother, who had died a few days earlier.

== See also ==
- List of members of the United States Congress who died in office (1790–1899)

U.S. House of Representatives
Preceded by Joseph M. Kendall	Member of the U.S. House of Representatives from Kentucky's 10th congressional district 1893–1894	Succeeded by William M. Beckner
