= Byron F. Ritchie =

American politician (1853–1928)

Byron Foster Ritchie
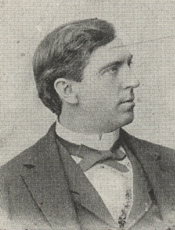

Member of the U.S. House of Representatives from Ohio's 9th district
- In office March 4, 1893 – March 3, 1895
- Preceded by: Joseph H. Outhwaite
- Succeeded by: James H. Southard

Personal details
- Born: January 29, 1853 Grafton, Ohio, U.S.
- Died: August 22, 1928 (aged 75) Toledo, Ohio, U.S.
- Resting place: Woodlawn Cemetery
- Party: Democratic
- Spouse: Kate I. Taylor
- Children: one

Byron Foster Ritchie (January 29, 1853 – August 22, 1928) was an American lawyer and politician who served one term as a U.S. representative from Ohio from 1893 to 1895.

He was the son of James Monroe Ritchie, who also served one term in Congress.

== Biography ==
Born in Grafton, Ohio, Ritchie moved with his parents to Toledo, Ohio, in 1860. He graduated from the Toledo High School in 1870. He studied law with his father, was admitted to the bar in 1874 and commenced practice in Toledo.

=== Congress ===
Ritchie was elected as a Democrat to the Fifty-third Congress (March 4, 1893 – March 3, 1895). He was an unsuccessful candidate for re-election in 1894 to the Fifty-fourth Congress. He resumed the practice of law in Toledo.

=== Later career and death ===
Ritchie was elected judge of the court of common pleas of Lucas County, Ohio, in 1914. He was re-elected in 1916 and again in 1922, and served until his death in Toledo on August 22, 1928. He was interred in Woodlawn Cemetery.

=== Private life ===
Ritchie married Kate I. Taylor on April 11, 1878. They had a daughter named Violet. Ritchie was a member of the Freemasons and the Benevolent and Protective Order of Elks.

== Sources ==
- United States Congress. "Byron F. Ritchie (id: R000272)". Biographical Directory of the United States Congress.

U.S. House of Representatives
Preceded by Joseph H. Outhwaite	United States Representative from Ohio's 9th congressional district 1893–1895	Succeeded by James H. Southard
