= John Fairfax, 11th Lord Fairfax of Cameron =

American man (1830-1900)

John Contee Fairfax, 11th Lord Fairfax of Cameron (18 September 1830 – 25 September 1900) was an American peer, landowner, and physician.

== Early life ==
John Contee Fairfax was born into the Fairfax noble family, at Vaucluse Plantation in Virginia. Fairfax was second son of Albert Fairfax, Master of Fairfax (15 April 1802 – 9 May 1835) and Mistress Caroline Eliza Snowden (21 April 1812 – 28 December 1899), who were married on 7 April 1828. He inherited the baronial title when his elder brother, Charles S. Fairfax, 10th Lord Fairfax of Cameron, former Speaker of the California Assembly, died without issue.

== Personal life ==
He married Mary Brown Kirby, daughter of Col. Edward Kirby, U.S. Army, in 1857. They had the following children:

- Hon. Caroline Snowden Fairfax
- Hon. Josephine Fairfax, who married Mr. Tunstall Smith
- Albert Fairfax, 12th Lord Fairfax of Cameron (1870-1939), who married Maude Wishart McKelvie.

He died at age 70 at Northampton Plantation, Prince George's County, Maryland. At the time of his death he was the only American citizen to be considered a member of the British peerage.

== See also ==
- Lord Fairfax of Cameron
- Northampton Plantation

Peerage of Scotland
Preceded by Charles S. Fairfax	Lord Fairfax of Cameron; 1869–1900	Succeeded by Albert Fairfax
