= William M. Beckner =

American politician (1841–1910)

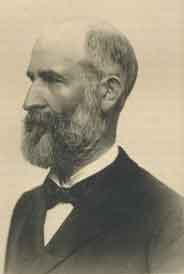

Member of the U.S. House of Representatives from Kentucky's 10th district
- In office December 3, 1894 – March 3, 1895
- Preceded by: Marcus C. Lisle
- Succeeded by: Joseph M. Kendall

Member of the Kentucky House of Representatives from the 74th district
- In office January 1, 1894 – December 3, 1894
- Preceded by: James P. Gay (Note: As the representative from Clark County.)
- Succeeded by: J. D. Wills

Personal details
- Born: June 19, 1841 Moorefield, Kentucky
- Died: March 14, 1910 (aged 68) Winchester, Kentucky
- Resting place: Winchester Cemetery
- Party: Democratic
- Education: Centre College
- Profession: Lawyer

William Morgan Beckner (June 19, 1841 – March 14, 1910) was a U.S. Representative from Kentucky.

Born in Moorefield, Kentucky, Beckner attended the public schools, Maysville Academy, Maysville, Kentucky, and Centre College, Danville, Kentucky. He worked on a farm and was subsequently a clerk in a country store at Bethel, Kentucky. He became a private tutor and taught school for two years in Orangeburg and Maysville. He studied law. He was admitted to the bar in 1864 and commenced practice in Winchester, Kentucky. He was city judge in 1865. He served as prosecuting attorney in 1866 and 1867. He was elected judge of Clark County in 1870. He established the Clark County Democrat in 1867, which he owned and edited for a number of years. He was appointed State prison commissioner in 1880. He served as State railroad commissioner from 1882 until 1884, when he resigned. He served as president of the interstate educational conventions held in Louisville in 1883 and 1885. He served as member of the State constitutional convention in 1890. He served as member of the State house of representatives in 1893. He served as chairman of the Democratic State convention in 1893.

Beckner was elected as a Democrat to the Fifty-third Congress to fill the vacancy caused by the death of Marcus C. Lisle and served from December 3, 1894, to March 3, 1895. He was an unsuccessful candidate for renomination in 1894. He resumed the practice of law. He died in Winchester, Kentucky, March 14, 1910. He was interred in Winchester Cemetery.

== Notes ==
U.S. House of Representatives
Preceded by Marcus C. Lisle	Member of the U.S. House of Representatives from Kentucky's 10th congressional district 1894-1895 (obsolete district)	Succeeded by Joseph M. Kendall
