= James H. Southard =

American politician

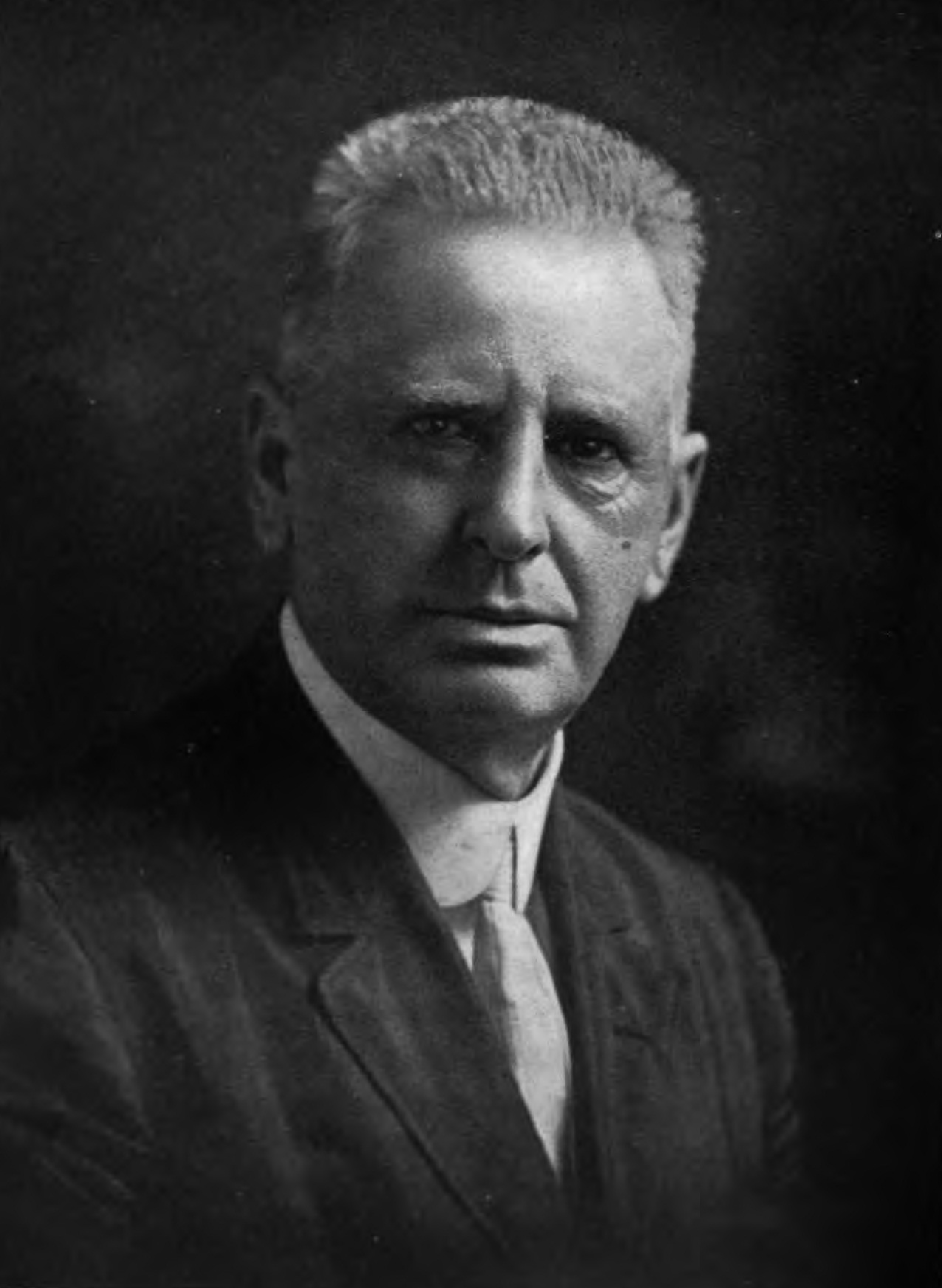

Member of the U.S. House of Representatives from Ohio's 9th district
- In office March 4, 1895 – March 3, 1907
- Preceded by: Byron F. Ritchie
- Succeeded by: Isaac R. Sherwood

Personal details
- Born: James Harding Southard; January 20, 1851 Washington Township, Ohio, U.S.
- Died: February 20, 1919 (aged 68) Toledo, Ohio, U.S.
- Resting place: Woodlawn Cemetery
- Party: Republican
- Spouse: Carrie T. Wales
- Children: three
- Education: Cornell University
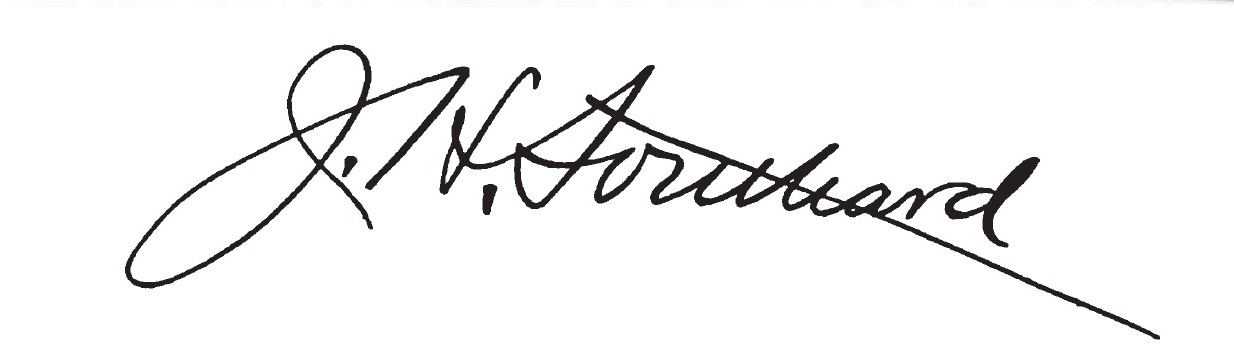
- Signature

James Harding Southard (January 20, 1851 – February 20, 1919) was an American lawyer and politician who served six terms as a U.S. representative from Ohio from 1895 to 1907.

== Early life ==
Southard was born near Toledo, Ohio, in Washington Township, Lucas County, Ohio, Southard attended the public schools and was graduated from Cornell University, Ithaca, New York, in 1874.

== Career ==
After studying law, he was admitted to the bar in 1877 and commenced practice in Toledo, Ohio. He was appointed assistant prosecuting attorney of Lucas County in 1882. Twice elected prosecuting attorney of the county, he served in that office six years.

Southard was elected as a Republican to the Fifty-fourth and to the five succeeding Congresses (March 4, 1895 – March 3, 1907).

He served as chairman of the Committee on Coinage, Weights, and Measures (Fifty-sixth through Fifty-ninth Congresses). During his time in Congress, Southard passed legislation establishing the National Bureau of Standards, and introduced a bill (though it never passed) requiring the U.S. to adopt the metric system.

He was an unsuccessful candidate for reelection in 1906 to the Sixtieth Congress.

He resumed the practice of law in Toledo, Ohio, until his death in 1919.

== Personal life ==
In 1883, Southard was married to Carrie T. Wales of Toledo. They had three children. He was a Freemason, a member of the Knights of Pythias, and an Elk.

Southard died in Toledo on February 20, 1919 and was interred in Woodlawn Cemetery.

U.S. House of Representatives
Preceded by Byron F. Ritchie	Member of the U.S. House of Representatives from Ohio's 9th congressional district March 4, 1895–March 3, 1907	Succeeded by Isaac R. Sherwood
