= William Duhurst Merrick =

American politician (1793–1857)

United States Senator from Maryland
- In office January 4, 1838 – March 3, 1845
- Preceded by: Joseph Kent
- Succeeded by: Reverdy Johnson

Member of the Maryland House of Delegates
- In office 1832–1838

Personal details
- Born: October 25, 1793 Annapolis, Maryland
- Died: February 5, 1857 (aged 63) Washington, D.C.
- Party: Whig

William Duhurst Merrick (October 25, 1793 – February 5, 1857) was a United States senator from Maryland, serving from 1838 to 1845.

Merrick was born in Annapolis, Maryland and completed preparatory studies. He later graduated from Georgetown University in Washington, D.C.

Merrick held several local offices and served in the War of 1812. He was the register of wills of Charles County, Maryland from 1825 to 1832. He studied law, was admitted to the bar, and commenced practice in Port Tobacco, Maryland.

From 1832 to 1838, Merrick served in the Maryland House of Delegates. He was elected as a Whig to the United States Senate to fill the vacancy caused by the death of Joseph Kent. He was reelected in 1839 and served from January 4, 1838, to March 3, 1845. In the Senate, Kent served as chairman of the Committee on the District of Columbia (Twenty-sixth and Twenty-seventh Congresses), as a member of the Committee on Post Office and Post Roads (Twenty-seventh and Twenty-eighth Congresses).

After his service in the Senate, Merrick served as a member of the State constitutional convention in 1850. He was again elected to the House of Delegates, and served from January 1856 until his death in Washington, D.C. Merrick was interred in Mount Olivet Cemetery, then reinterred in the cemetery at St. Mary's Roman Catholic Church, Newport. His sons, William Matthews Merrick and Richard T. Merrick, were also prominent attorneys. William Matthews, the first American-born Catholic priest, was his brother-in-law.

U.S. Senate
Preceded by Joseph Kent	U.S. senator (Class 1) from Maryland; 1838–1845; Served alongside: John S. Spence, John Leeds Kerr, James A. Pearce	Succeeded by Reverdy Johnson
