= United States Senate Committee on the District of Columbia =

The United States Senate Committee on the District of Columbia was one of the first standing committees created in the United States Senate, in 1816. It had jurisdiction over the District of Columbia. It continued to exist until the reorganization of 1977 when, following the granting of home rule to the district, its duties were transferred to the Committee on Governmental Affairs.

== Committee chairmen ==
Chairman	Party	State	Years
Armistead Mason	Democratic–Republican	Virginia	1816–1817
Robert Henry Goldsborough	Federalist	Maryland	1817–1819
Outerbridge Horsey	Federalist	Delaware	1819–1821
James Barbour	Democratic–Republican	Virginia	1821–1823
Edward Lloyd	Democratic–Republican	Maryland	1823–1826
Ezekiel F. Chambers	Democratic–Republican	Maryland	1826–1827
John Eaton	Democratic–Republican	Tennessee	1827–1829
Ezekiel F. Chambers	National Republican	Maryland	1829–1834
John Tyler	Whig	Virginia	1834–1836
Joseph Kent	Whig	Maryland	1836–1837
William H. Roane	Democratic	Virginia	1837–1839
William Merrick	Whig	Maryland	1839––1841
Richard H. Bayard	Whig	Delaware	1841–1842
Jacob Miller	Whig	New Jersey	1842–1845
William Haywood Jr.	Democratic	North Carolina	1845–1846
Simon Cameron	Democratic	Pennsylvania	1846–1848
Herschel V. Johnson	Democratic	Georgia	1848–1849
James Mason	Democratic	Virginia	1849–1851
James Shields	Democratic	Illinois	1851–1853
Moses Norris Jr.	Democratic	New Hampshire	1853–1855
Albert Brown	Democratic	Mississippi	1855–1861
James Grimes	Republican	Iowa	1861–1864
John P. Hale	Republican	New Hampshire	1864–1865
Lot Morrill	Republican	Maine	1865–1867
James Harlan	Republican	Iowa	1867–1869
Hannibal Hamlin	Republican	Maine	1869–1870
James Patterson	Republican	New Hampshire	1870–1873
John F. Lewis	Republican	Virginia	1873–1875
George E. Spencer	Republican	Alabama	1875–1877
Stephen Dorsey	Republican	Arkansas	1877–1879
Isham G. Harris	Democratic	Tennessee	1879––1881
John Ingalls	Republican	Kansas	1881–1891
James McMillan	Republican	Michigan	1891–1893
Isham G. Harris	Democratic	Tennessee	1893–1895
James K. Jones	Democratic	Arkansas	1895–1896
James McMillan	Republican	Michigan	1896––1902
Jacob Gallinger	Republican	New Hampshire	1903––1913
John Walter Smith	Democratic	Maryland	1913–1919
Lawrence Y. Sherman	Republican	Illinois	1919–1921
L. Heisler Ball	Republican	Delaware	1921–1925
Arthur Capper	Republican	Kansas	1925–1933
William H. King	Democratic	Utah	1933–1941
Pat McCarran	Democratic	Nevada	1941–1945
Theodore G. Bilbo	Democratic	Mississippi	1945–1947
C. Douglass Buck	Republican	Delaware	1947–1949
J. Howard McGrath	Democratic	Rhode Island	1949
Matthew M. Neely	Democratic	West Virginia	1949–1953
Francis Case	Republican	South Dakota	1953–1955
Matthew M. Neely	Democratic	West Virginia	1955–1958
Alan Bible	Democratic	Nevada	1958–1969
Joseph D. Tydings	Democratic	Maryland	1969–1971
Thomas F. Eagleton	Democratic	Missouri	1971–1977
