= John C. Herbert =

American politician (1775-1846)

John Carlyle Herbert

Member of the U.S. House of Representatives from Maryland's 2nd district
- In office March 4, 1815 – March 3, 1819
- Preceded by: Joseph Kent
- Succeeded by: Joseph Kent

Member of the Maryland Senate from Prince George's County
- In office 1826–1830

Speaker of the Maryland House of Delegates
- In office 1812–1813
- Preceded by: Tobias E. Stansbury
- Succeeded by: Henry Henley Chapman

Member of the Maryland House of Delegates from Prince George's County
- In office 1808–1813

Member of the Virginia House of Delegates from Fairfax County
- In office December 3, 1798-December 1, 1799 Serving with Roger West
- Preceded by: Augustine J. Smith
- Succeeded by: Thomas Swann

Personal details
- Born: August 16, 1775 Alexandria, Virginia Colony, British America
- Died: September 1, 1846 (aged 71) Buchanan, Botetourt County, Virginia, U.S.
- Resting place: Green Mount Cemetery
- Party: Federalist
- Spouse: Mary Snowden
- Education: St. John's College
- Occupation: Planter, attorney, politician

Military service
- Allegiance: United States
- Branch/service: United States Army
- Years of service: 1812-1815
- Rank: Captain
- Unit: Bladensburg Horse
- Battles/wars: War of 1812

John Carlyle Herbert (August 16, 1775 – September 1, 1846) was an American lawyer, planter, military officer in the War of 1812 and politician. He served as a legislator in both Virginia and Maryland, as well as a U.S. Congressman representing Maryland's 2nd congressional district (1814-1818).

== Early and family life ==
Born in Alexandria, Virginia to the former Sarah Fairfax Carlyle (1757-1827) and her merchant husband William Herbert (1743-1818), John was born to the First Families of Virginia at the start of the American Revolutionary War. Members of his extended family aligned with both sides in that conflict. His father was a member of the Committee of Safety for Fairfax County, Virginia, and sold supplies to General Washington's army. Two of his maternal relatives, the 7th and 8th Lords Fairfax of Cameron had claims to the Northern Neck Proprietary, and were Loyalists during the war. His younger (but eldest) sister, Margaret Herbert (1785-1858) married her first cousin Thomas Fairfax, one of the sons of his mother's half-brother, Rev. Bryan Fairfax, who was a personal friend of General Washington and was named the 8th Lord Fairfax of Cameron and the first American-born member of the House of Lords, although he spent his final years in Fairfax County near Alexandria, dying at his plantation house, Mount Eagle. Bryan Fairfax and his progeny, however, did not inherit the Northern Neck Proprietary, which his first cousin Robert Fairfax the 7th Lord Fairfax left to his nephew, Rev. Denny Martin (who remained in England and after considerable litigation attempting to enforce his rights to land rents in the wake of escalating Virginia protection of occupants, sold those vast lands to a group formed by Virginia lawyer and future Chief Justice John Marshall). Another of Rev. Fairfax's sons, Ferdinando Fairfax, sympathized with the American patriots. His maternal grandfather was prominent Scottish-born merchant John Carlyle. Another sister, Sarah Herbert, married, Rev. Oliver Norris, and remained in Alexandria, Virginia, as did their mother. Other sisters were Anne, Eliza and Lucinda Herbert. His brother, also William Herbert became a merchant and banker and won election as Alexandria's mayor. As customary for his class, Herbert received private instruction locally, then attended St. John's College in Annapolis, Maryland in 1794. Returning to Virginia, he studied law.

In 1805 he married Mary Snowden, daughter of Maryland planter Thomas Snowden and his wife Ann, and soon moved to Prince George's County, Maryland where they lived on a plantation called "Walnut Grange" near Beltsville. They had thirteen children, many of whom died young. Their daughter Mary Virginia Herbert (1816-1857) married Thomas Triplett Hunter and remained in Maryland. Emma Herbert (1818-1874) married Rev. William Bryant (1800-1846) and moved to southwestern Virginia, where they raised children including John Carlyle Herbert Bryant, some of whom moved back to Alexandria.

== Career ==
Admitted to the Virginia bar, Herbert began his legal practice in Richmond, Virginia around 1795.

Herbert returned to northern Virginia shortly after creation of the new federal city (Alexandria becoming part of the District of Columbia until 1847). Herbert first won election to the Virginia House of Delegates, representing Fairfax County in 1798.

=== Maryland planter and politician ===
Following his marriage Herbert resettled in Prince George's County, Maryland in 1805, and began operating a plantation using enslaved labor. Three years later, he won election to the Maryland House of Delegates, and won re-election several times, serving from 1808 to 1813. In his last two terms he was speaker of the House (in 1812 and 1813). Following his military and Congressional service discussed below, Herbert served in the Maryland State Senate from 1826 until 1830.

Herbert operated plantations using enslaved labor. In 1810, his household included 7 white people and 45 enslaved people, and a decade later, he owned 46 slaves. In 1840, the last census in his lifetime the number of Herbert's slaves dropped dramatically, possibly as he provided his daughters with dowries.

=== War of 1812 ===
He recruited a cavalry troop and served as captain of the Bladensburg Troop of Horse during the War of 1812.

=== Congress ===
In 1814, Herbert was elected as a Federalist to the Fourteenth and Fifteenth Congresses, serving from March 4, 1815, to March 3, 1819. During the Fifteenth Congress, Herbert was chairman of the Committee on the District of Columbia. He retired to his estate "Walnut Grange" in Beltsville, Maryland, in 1820 and resumed farming as well as his legal practice and political activities. He served as a Presidential elector from Maryland in 1824.

== Death and legacy ==
John Carlyle Herbert died in Buchanan, Botetourt County, Virginia visiting his daughter Emma and her family. His remains were returned to Maryland and interred at Green Mount Cemetery in Baltimore, Maryland. St. Bartholomew's Episcopal Church in Laytonsville, Maryland, which he helped form as Zion Parish, remains an active congregation.

Political offices
Preceded by Tobias E. Stansbury	Speaker of the Maryland House of Delegates; 1812–1813	Succeeded by Henry Henley Chapman
U.S. House of Representatives
Preceded by Joseph Kent	Member of the U.S. House of Representatives from Maryland's 2nd congressional district 1815–1819	Succeeded by Joseph Kent
