= Joshua Brattan =

American politician (died 1838)

Member of the Maryland House of Delegates
- In office 1822–1823

Personal details
- Died: November 29, 1838
- Spouse: Anne Porter
- Children: 6
- Relatives: Robert F. Brattan (grandson)
- Occupation: Politician; farmer; storekeeper

Joshua Brattan (died November 29, 1838) was an American politician. He served in the Maryland House of Delegates from 1822 to 1823.

== Early life ==
Joshua Brattan was born to Mary (née Polk) and James Brattan. His father was a lieutenant and emigrated from Ireland to Maryland.

== Career ==
Brattan was the storekeeper of the Brattan-Taylor Store. He was also a farmer and landowner.

Brattan served in the Maryland House of Delegates, representing Somerset County, from 1822 to 1823. He was the sheriff of Somerset County in 1828.

Brattan served on the 1838 Democratic committee that nominated William Grason for Governor of Maryland.

== Personal life ==
Brattan owned the Brattan-Taylor Store and the Barren Creek Springs Hotel on Main and Branch streets in Mardela Springs, Maryland. He also owned a tract of land known as the "Ill Neighborhood" in Somerset County. In 1834, Brattan gave an acre of land to Presbyterian trustees to establish a school, cemetery and church between Barren Creek Mills and Barren Creek Springs in Mardela Springs. In 1842, the congregation built a church building and the cemetery was known as Barren Creek Cemetery.

Brattan married Anne Porter. Brattan had six sons: Anthony, Franklin, Joseph, Samuel, Lemuel Rush and James Thomas. His grandson was U.S. Representative Robert F. Brattan.

Brattan died on November 29, 1838.
