= Stoddert, Virginia =

Unincorporated community in Virginia, United States

Coordinates: 37°21′02″N 78°17′42″W

Stoddert is an unincorporated community in Cumberland County, in the U.S. state of Virginia.
