= Samuel Stevens Jr. =

American politician (1778–1860)

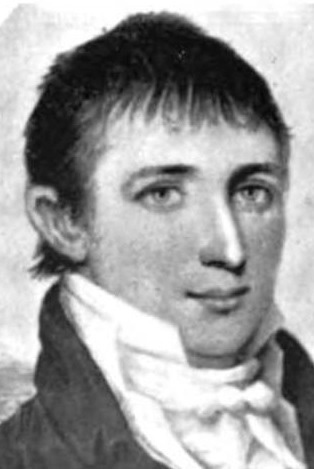

18th Governor of Maryland
- In office December 16, 1822 – January 9, 1826
- Preceded by: Samuel Sprigg
- Succeeded by: Joseph Kent

Member of the Maryland House of Delegates
- In office 1807–1813
- In office 1817
- In office 1819–1820

Personal details
- Born: July 13, 1778 Talbot County, Maryland, U.S.
- Died: February 7, 1860 (aged 81) Talbot County, Maryland, U.S.
- Resting place: Spring Hill Cemetery; Easton, Maryland, U.S.
- Party: Democratic-Republican

Samuel Stevens Jr. (July 13, 1778 – February 7, 1860) served as the 18th governor of the state of Maryland in the United States from 1822 to 1826. He intermittently represented Talbot County, Maryland in the House of Delegates from 1807 to 1820.

== Biography ==
Samuel Stevens Jr. is thought to have been born in Talbot County, Maryland on July 13, 1778. He was the son of John Stevens and Elizabeth Connoly, and a descendant of the Quakers who had initially settled both Dorchester and Talbot Counties. His father died when he was 16 years old. He had no formal education and was in business in Philadelphia for a short time. In 1804, he married Eliza May of Chester, Pennsylvania, and they had one son. He inherited the estate Compton from his father in 1794.

He was chosen to the Maryland House of Delegates from Talbot County in 1807 and served a number of non-consecutive terms until 1820. Stevens was elected Governor on December 9, 1822, defeating James B. Robins. His tenure is remembered for the enfranchisement of the Jews, the abolition of a religious test for Maryland office holders, the extension of the civil liberties guaranteed in the Bill of Rights to State law, and the creation of the Chesapeake and Ohio Canal. The governor also welcomed the Marquis de Lafayette to Maryland during his triumphal tour of the nation. He was re-elected in 1823 and 1824.

He was succeeded as governor by Joseph Kent on January 9, 1826, and retired to his home on "Dividing Creek." He died at "Compton" on February 7, 1860, at 81 years old and buried in the family cemetery at Spring Hill Cemetery in Easton, Maryland.

== Legacy ==
Compton was added to the National Register of Historic Places in 1974.

Political offices
Preceded by Samuel Sprigg	Governor of Maryland; 1822–1826	Succeeded by Joseph Kent
