= John Truman Stoddert =

American politician

Member of the U.S. House of Representatives from Maryland's 8th district
- In office March 4, 1833 – March 3, 1835
- Preceded by: John S. Spence
- Succeeded by: Seat abolished

Member of Maryland House of Delegates
- In office 1815–1816, 1820

Personal details
- Born: October 1, 1790 Nanjemoy, Maryland, U.S.
- Died: July 19, 1870 (aged 79) Charles County, Maryland, U.S.
- Party: Democratic
- Spouse: Elizabeth Gwynn (m. 1815)
- Children: 2
- Relatives: William Smallwood (great uncle)
- Education: Princeton College
- Military career
- Allegiance: USA
- Rank: Major
- Conflicts: War of 1812

John Truman Stoddert (October 1, 1790 – July 19, 1870) was an American politician from Maryland.

== Early life ==
John Truman Stoddert was born at Smith Point in Nanjemoy, Maryland, on October 1, 1790. He was the son of William Truman Stoddert and Sally Massey. He graduated from Princeton College in 1810. He studied law at Litchfield Law School and Annapolis with Judge Alexander C. Magruder. He was admitted to the Bar, and entered into practice in Charles County, Maryland.

== Career ==
Stoddert served as a major in the War of 1812 and as aide-de-camp under Philip Stuart.

From 1815 to 1816 and in 1820, he served in the Maryland House of Delegates. He also served as a senate elector from Charles County in 1826. From March 4, 1833, to March 3, 1835, he represented the eighth district of Maryland in the United States House of Representatives, as a Jacksononian Democrat. He was a member of the Maryland Constitutional Convention of 1867.

After his departure from Congress, he engaged in agricultural practices until his death. He was a slave owner.

== Personal life ==
Stoddert married Elizabeth Gwynn on May 23, 1815, in Anne Arundel County, Maryland. Together, they had two daughters, Mary and Elizabeth.

He was the great nephew of William Smallwood.

== Later life and death ==
Stoddert moved to Baltimore. He died on July 19, 1870, at his family estate, Wicomico House, at West Hatton Estate in Charles County, while visiting. He was buried at Wicomico House.

U.S. House of Representatives
Preceded by John S. Spence	Member of the U.S. House of Representatives from Maryland's 8th congressional district 1833–1835	Succeeded by Seat abolished
