= Northampton Plantation =

American plantation established by Thomas Sprigg in 1673

Coordinates: 38°54′12″N 76°49′01″W

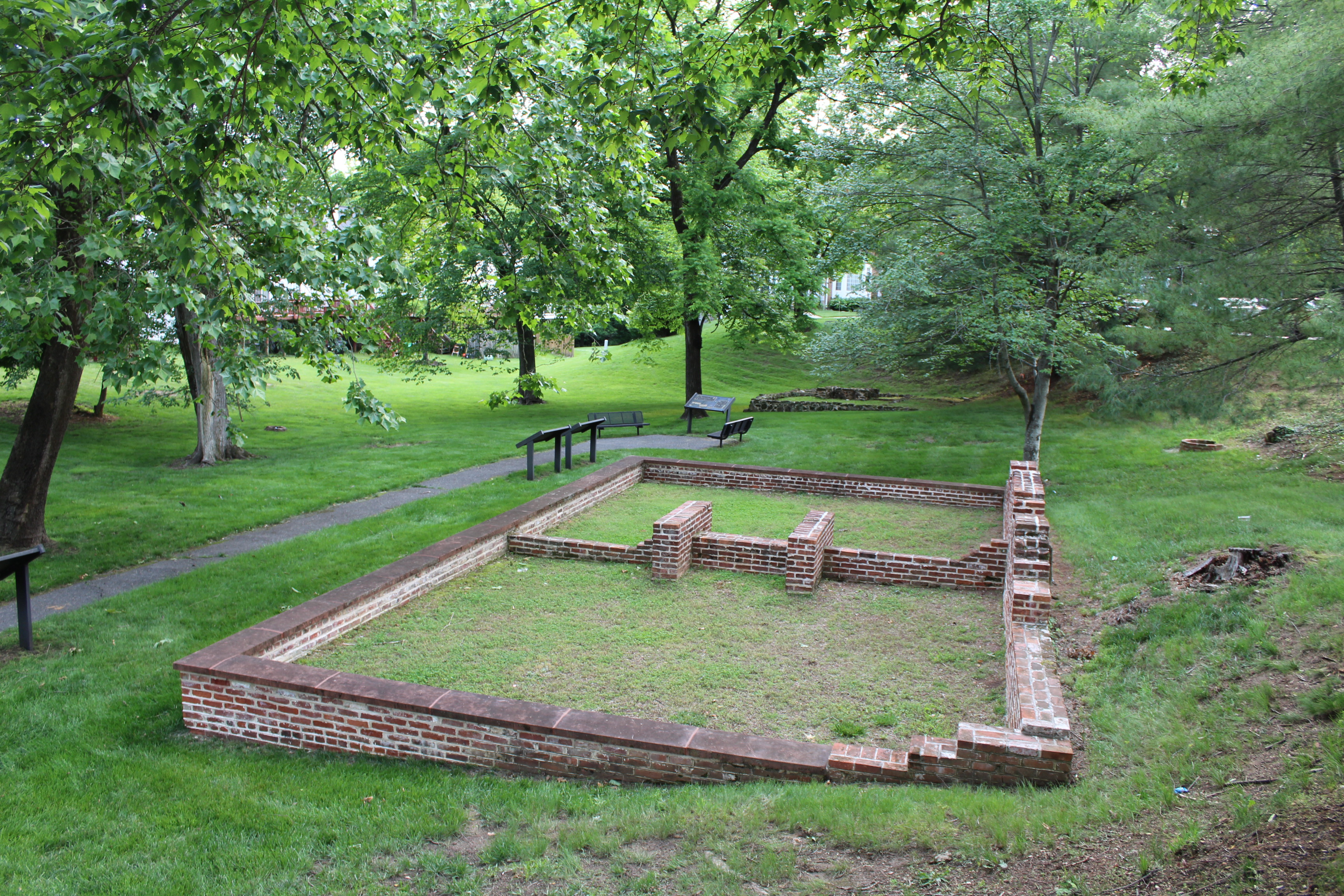
Northampton Plantation Slave Quarters & Archaeological Park in 2025

Northampton Plantation was an American plantation established by Thomas Sprigg in 1673.

Charles Calvert, 3rd Baron Baltimore granted a 1000-acre tract of land to Thomas Sprigg in 1673. The tract was called "Northampton," and Sprigg built his plantation there. The main crop was tobacco. The plantation also produced grain, livestock, and dairy products. There were slave quarters built of brick and of wood, with a gable roof.

== History ==
The Sprigg family, along with its descendants, servants, and enslaved people, lived at Northampton for almost 200 years. The plantation was passed down to Osborne Sprigg, a Revolutionary patriot, and Samuel Sprigg (1783–1855), who became Governor of Maryland.

British soldiers stopped overnight to rest at Northampton Plantation on August 26, 1814. They were exhausted after the burning of Washington and the Battle of Bladensburg.

“It was...absolutely necessary to pause... (T)hrowing ourselves on the ground...in less than five minutes there was not a single unclosed eye throughout the whole brigade.”--British Lt. George Robert Gleig

John Contee Fairfax, 11th Lord Fairfax of Cameron purchased Northampton Plantation in 1865.

A photograph of the plantation house appeared in the Baltimore Sun in 1905. It was a frame house about 125 feet long. The original sections were assembled without nails. There was a drawing room, a library, a dining room with wide fireplaces, and bedrooms with high Gothic windows. The grounds were wooded with elm, willow, poplars, flowering magnolia trees, and a lilac hedge. A well house was surrounded by a grove. The estate at that time was about 800 acres.

Although the plantation house burned down in 1909, descendants of freed African Americans continued to farm at Northampton as tenants until the 1930s.

== Legacy ==
The site is now Northampton Plantation Slave Quarters & Archaeological Park in Bowie, Maryland. The park features the foundations of two former slave quarters that have been reconstructed as permanent outdoor museum exhibits in a park setting with interpretive signs. Group tours and school programs can be arranged by appointment.
