= Christopher Bratton =

American educator, academic administrator and filmmaker

President of San Francisco Art Institute
- In office 2004–2010

President of School of the Museum of Fine Arts, Boston
- In office July 1, 2010 – July 2016

Personal details
- Born: c. 1960
- Education: University of Wisconsin–Milwaukee (MFA)
- Occupation: Academic administrator, educator, filmmaker

Christopher Bratton (born c. 1960), is an American educator, academic administrator, and filmmaker. He is the former president of School of the Museum of Fine Arts, Boston, and former deputy director of Museum of Fine Arts, Boston. Prior, he had served as the president of San Francisco Art Institute (2004–2010), and dean of undergraduate studies, chair and professor of the film and video departments at the School of the Art Institute of Chicago (1993–2004). He also is a co-founder of Video Machete, a community-based arts and media project in Chicago.

Bratton obtained his M.F.A. degree in film from the Peck School of the Arts at the University of Wisconsin–Milwaukee.
