= Robert F. Brattan =

American politician (1845–1894)

Robert Franklin Brattan

Member of the U.S. House of Representatives from Maryland's 1st district
- In office March 4, 1893 – May 10, 1894
- Preceded by: John Brewer Brown
- Succeeded by: Winder Laird Henry

President of the Maryland State Senate
- In office 1890–1892
- Preceded by: George Peter
- Succeeded by: Edward Lloyd VII

Member of the Maryland State Senate
- In office 1874–1876, 1880–1884, 1888–1892

Member of the Maryland House of Delegates
- In office 1870

Personal details
- Born: May 13, 1845 Somerset County, Maryland, U.S.
- Died: May 10, 1894 (aged 48) Princess Anne, Maryland, U.S.
- Resting place: St. Andrew's Cemetery; Princess Anne, Maryland, U.S.
- Party: Democratic
- Spouse: Nellie Hooe Dennis (m. 1884)
- Children: 3
- Relatives: Joshua Brattan (grandfather)
- Education: Washington College
- Occupation: Politician; lawyer

Robert Franklin Brattan (May 13, 1845 – May 10, 1894) was an American politician and lawyer. He served in the Maryland House of Delegates, Maryland Senate and the U.S. House of Representatives.

== Early life ==
Robert Franklin Brattan was born on May 13, 1845, in Barren Creek Springs in Somerset (now Wicomico) County, Maryland to Elizabeth (née Venables) and Joseph Brattan. His father was a merchant and agriculturist. His grandfather was Joshua Brattan, a state delegate from Somerset County. Brattan was named for his uncle, Franklin Brattan, a lawyer who practiced law with David Davis in Illinois. At the age of nineteen, during the American Civil War, Brattan was arrested on a charge of carrying a Southern spy near his home. His father was also arrested on charges of disloyalty.

Brattan attended schools in Somerset County. He graduated from Washington College of Chestertown, Maryland, in 1864. Brattan was appointed as deputy register of wills for Somerset County. He served in that role from September 1864 to March 1867. Brattan read law with the firm Jones & Irving, working with Isaac D. Jones and Levin Irving. He was admitted to the bar in July 1867. He continued with the firm Jones & Irving until January 1868.

== Career ==
In 1868, Brattan started a law practice with James U. Dennis.

Brattan's political career began as a member of the state convention of 1865 which sent delegates to a peace convention held in Philadelphia in the following year. He also served as a member of several State and congressional conventions and was elected to the Maryland House of Delegates in 1869, serving in the 1870 session. He was elected to the Maryland State Senate in 1873, serving the remainder of the term of George R. Dennis. He was re-elected for terms in 1879, 1887, and 1890. He served from 1874 to 1876, 1880 to 1884, and 1888 to 1892. In 1890, he served as President of the Maryland State Senate. In 1891, Brattan was considered for nomination as state comptroller at the Maryland Democratic Convention, but was unsuccessful.

After his tenure in the Senate, Brattan engaged in the practice of law in Princess Anne, and was elected late to the U.S. House of Representatives, representing Maryland's 1st District, in his life as a Democrat to the Fifty-third Congress. His tenure was just over a year in length until his death.

== Personal life ==
Brattan married Nellie Hooe Dennis, daughter of his law partner and state senator James U. Dennis and niece of George R. Dennis, in December 1884. They had three children: Cecilia, Nellie and Robert Franklin. His brother was J. Y. Brattan, a newspaper editor of the Baltimore Morning Herald.

Brattan died at his home in Princess Anne on May 10, 1894, from Bright's disease. He is interred in St. Andrew's Cemetery at St. Andrew's Episcopal Church in Princess Anne.

== See also ==
- List of members of the United States Congress who died in office (1790–1899)

U.S. House of Representatives
Preceded by John Brewer Brown	Member of the U.S. House of Representatives from Maryland's 1st congressional district March 4, 1893 – May 10, 1894	Succeeded by Winder Laird Henry
