= Samuel Sprigg =

American politician (1783-1855)

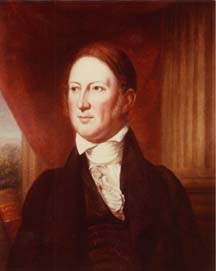

17th Governor of Maryland
- In office December 20, 1819 – December 16, 1822
- Preceded by: Charles Goldsborough
- Succeeded by: Samuel Stevens, Jr.

Personal details
- Born: ca. 1783 Maryland, U.S.
- Died: April 21, 1855 (aged 71–72) Prince George's County, Maryland, U.S.
- Resting place: Oak Hill Cemetery; Washington, D.C., U.S.

Samuel Sprigg (ca. 1783 – April 21, 1855) served as the 17th governor of the state of Maryland in the United States from 1819 to 1822.

== Background ==
Little is known of Sprigg's early life. He was possibly born in Washington County or Prince George's County, although conclusive proof has not been found. His father was Joseph Sprigg and was married several times. He was likely born to his father's third wife, Margaret Elzey Weems between 1781–1783. After his father's death in 1800, he was adopted by his uncle, Osborn Sprigg. He would eventually inherit Osborne's Prince George's County estate of Northampton.

On January 1, 1811, Sprigg married Violetta Lansdale, daughter of Thomas Lancaster Lansdale and Cornelia Van Horne. They eventually had two children.

The 1840 census recorded 117 enslaved people at the Northampton estate.

== Political career ==
Sprigg joined the Democratic-Republican Party at time when there was a Democratic-Republican resurgence in the state against the Federalists. He was elected Governor by the Maryland General Assembly on December 13, 1819, running against Charles Goldsborough.

His administration was marked by partisan bitterness between the Democratic-Republicans and Federalists. Specific issues were State constitutional reform and direct election of the state government (both opposed by the Federalists). Both of these efforts were defeated during Sprigg's administration, but would pass later.

His administration was very concerned with providing infrastructure to the western part of the state, embracing the construction of roads as well as completion of the Chesapeake and Ohio Canal. Under his administration, the charter of the Potomac Company to complete the canal was canceled due to poor performance and given to a new enterprise, the Chesapeake and Ohio Canal Company. He served on the Board of Directors for the Chesapeake and Ohio Canal Company.

He was re-elected to the Governorship, first in 1820 and again in 1821.

Sprigg retired from the Governor's office and from politics on December 16, 1822.

== Death and legacy ==
Sprigg died on April 21, 1855, and was buried at St. Barnabas Church in Upper Marlboro, Maryland, but was moved to Oak Hill Cemetery in Georgetown.

Political offices
Preceded by Charles Goldsborough	Governor of Maryland; 1819–1822	Succeeded by Samuel Stevens, Jr.
