= Robert Henry Goldsborough =

American politician

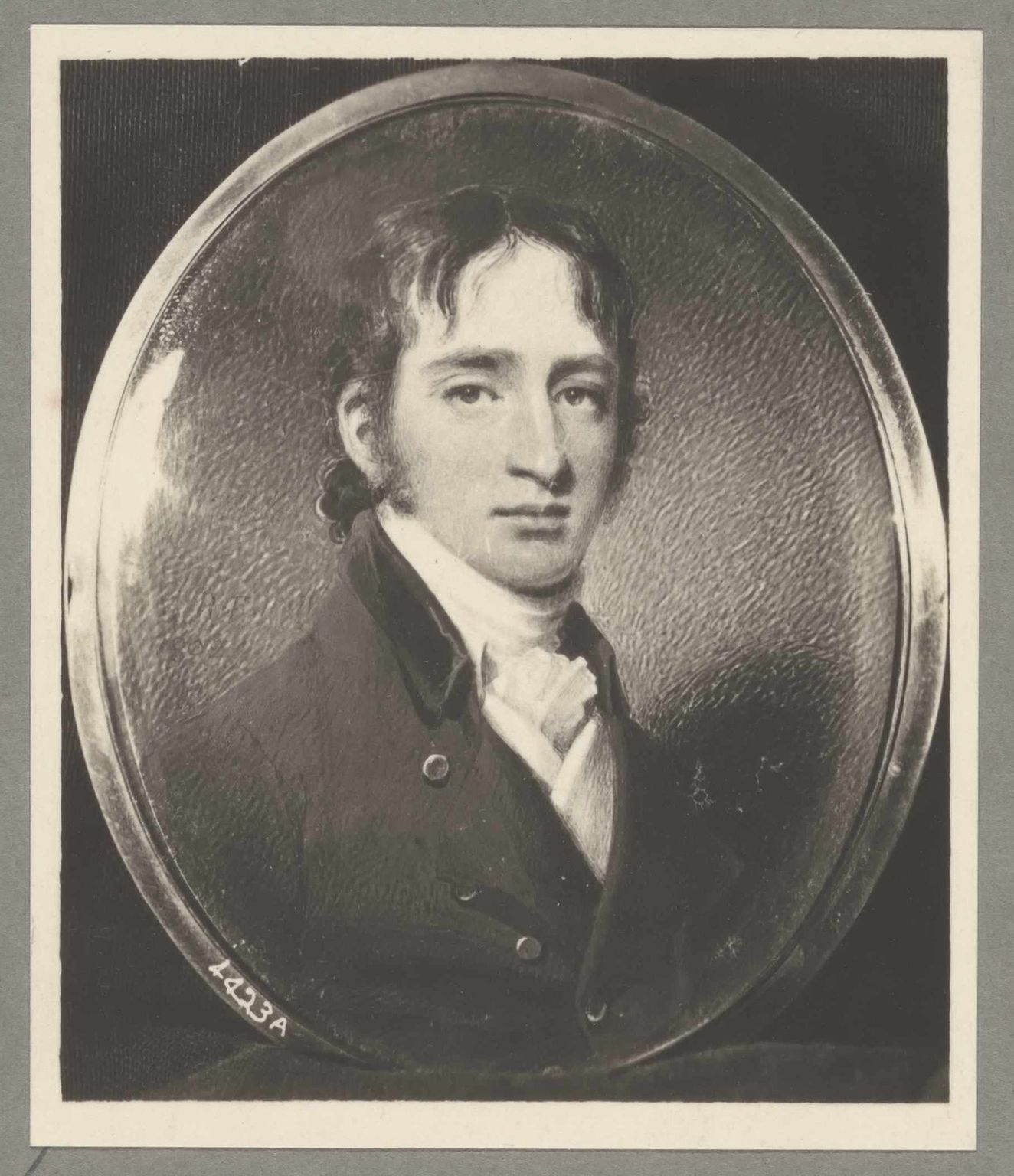

United States Senator from Maryland
- In office May 21, 1813 – March 4, 1819
- Preceded by: Philip Reed
- Succeeded by: Edward Lloyd V
- In office January 13, 1835 – October 5, 1836
- Preceded by: Ezekiel F. Chambers
- Succeeded by: John S. Spence

Member of the Maryland House of Delegates
- In office 1804

Personal details
- Born: January 4, 1779 Easton, Maryland, U.S.
- Died: October 5, 1836 (aged 57) Easton, Maryland, U.S.
- Party: Federalist; National Republican
- Relatives: Winder Laird Henry (great-grandson)

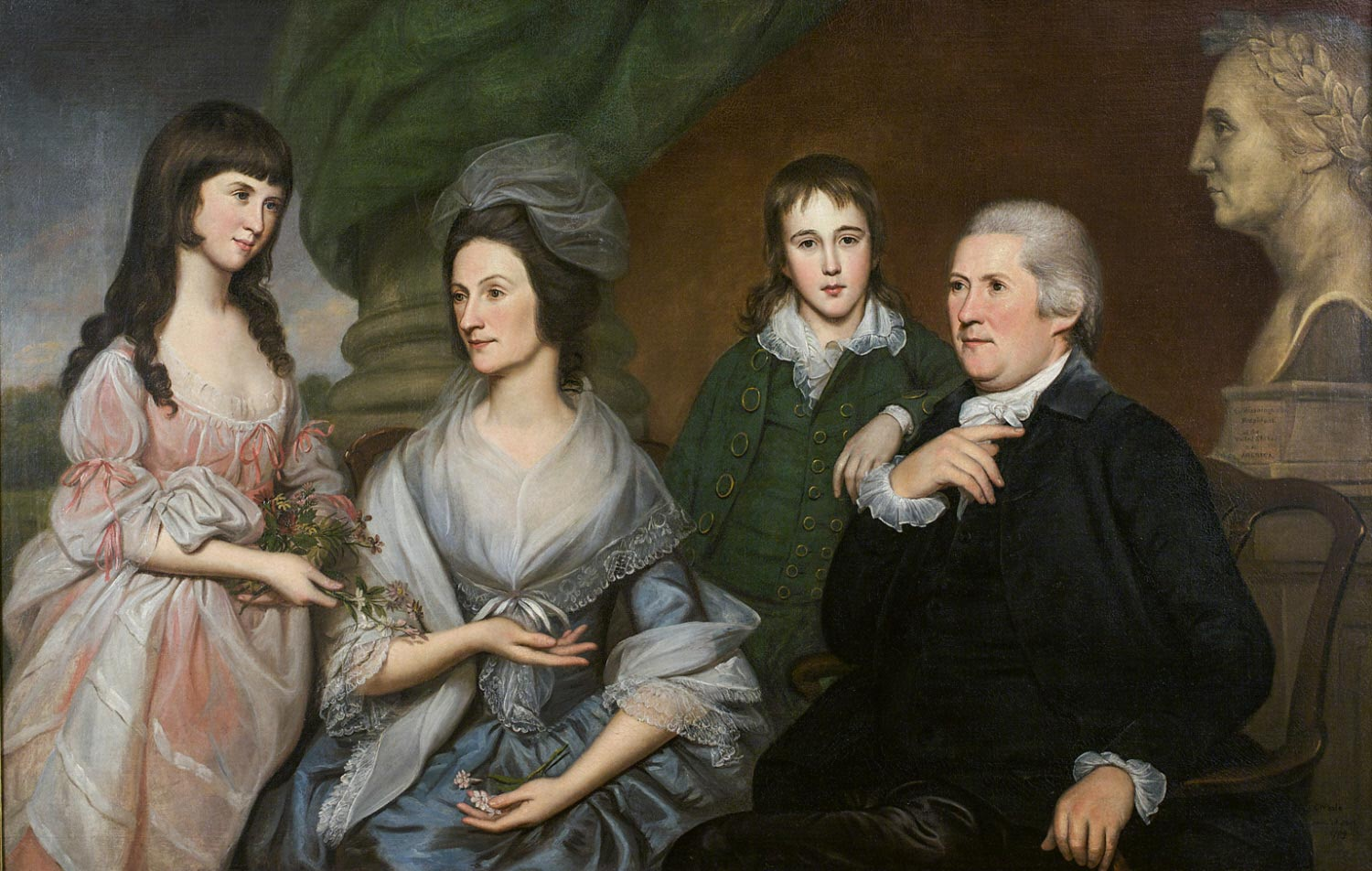
Robert Goldsborough, 1733 - 1788 Mary Emerson Trippe Goldsborough, born mid 18th Century Elizabeth Greenberry Goldsborough, 1776 - 1798 Robert Henry Goldsborough, 1779 - 1836

Robert Henry Goldsborough (January 4, 1779 – October 5, 1836) was an American politician from Talbot County, Maryland.

== Early life ==
Robert Henry Goldsborough was born on January 4, 1779, at "Myrtle Grove" near Easton, Maryland. He was educated by private tutors and graduated from St. John's College in Annapolis, Maryland, in 1795.

== Career ==
Goldsborough engaged in agricultural pursuits, and also served as a member of the Maryland House of Delegates in 1804. During the War of 1812, Goldsborough commanded a troop of horsemen in the Maryland Militia.

In 1813, Goldsborough was elected as a Federalist to the United States Senate to fill the vacancy in the term commencing March 4, 1813, caused by the failure of the legislature to elect a senator, and served from May 21, 1813, to March 3, 1819. In the senate, Goldsborough served as chairman of the Committee on Claims (Fifteenth Congress), and as a member of the Committee on the District of Columbia (Fifteenth Congress).

Goldsborough was elected a member of the American Antiquarian Society in 1814.

After his first term as Senator, Goldsborough resumed his agricultural pursuits. He was instrumental in establishing the Easton Gazette in 1817, and again became a member of the House of Delegates in 1825. He was again elected to the U.S. Senate as an Anti-Jacksonian National Republican (later Whig) to fill the vacancy caused by the resignation of Ezekiel F. Chambers, and served from January 13, 1835, until his death. In the senate, Goldsborough served as chairman of the Committee on Commerce (Twenty-fourth Congress).

== Death ==
Goldsborough died on October 5, 1836, at "Myrtle Grove" near Easton. He is interred at "Ashby", the family home in Talbot County. His great-grandson was Winder Laird Henry.

== See also ==
- List of members of the United States Congress who died in office (1790–1899)

U.S. Senate
Preceded by Philip Reed	U.S. senator (Class 3) from Maryland; 1813–1819; Served alongside: Samuel Smith, Robert G. Harper, Alexander C. Hanson	Succeeded by Edward Lloyd V
Preceded by Ezekiel F. Chambers	U.S. senator (Class 3) from Maryland; 1835–1836; Served alongside: Joseph Kent	Succeeded by John S. Spence
