= Charles Goldsborough =

American politician (1765–1834)

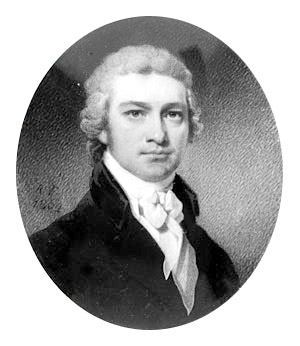

16th Governor of Maryland
- In office January 8, 1819 – December 20, 1819
- Preceded by: Charles C. Ridgely
- Succeeded by: Samuel Sprigg

Member of the U.S. House of Representatives from Maryland's 8th congressional district
- In office March 4, 1805 – March 4, 1817
- Preceded by: John Dennis
- Succeeded by: Thomas Bayly

Member of the Maryland State Senate
- In office 1791–1795
- In office 1799–1801

Member of the Maryland House of Delegates
- In office 1797
- In office 1801–1803

Personal details
- Born: July 15, 1765 Dorchester County, Province of Maryland, British America
- Died: December 13, 1834 (aged 69) Dorchester County, Maryland, U.S.
- Party: Federalist
- Children: 1
- Relatives: Thomas Alan Goldsborough (great-grandson); Winder Laird Henry (great-grandson)
- Education: University of Pennsylvania
- Profession: lawyer; politician

Charles Goldsborough (July 15, 1765 – December 13, 1834) served as the 16th governor of the state of Maryland in the United States in 1819.

== Early life ==
Goldsborough was born at "Hunting Creek", near Cambridge in Dorchester County, Maryland, and pursued an academic course. He graduated from the University of Pennsylvania at Philadelphia in 1784 and began to study law.

== Personal life ==
His daughter Maria married Virginia planter and politician William Henry Fitzhugh, son of patriot and planter William Fitzhugh.

== Career ==
In 1790, he was admitted to the bar, and early on held several local political offices. He was also a member of the Maryland State Senate from 1791 to 1795 and later from 1799 to 1801.

Goldsborough was elected as a Federalist to the Ninth and to the five succeeding Congresses, serving from March 4, 1805, to March 3, 1817. In 1814 he was elected a member of the American Antiquarian Society. He later served as Governor of Maryland in 1819. In 1820, he retired from public life and moved to his estate near Cambridge.

== Death and legacy ==
Goldsborough died at "Shoal Creek" near Cambridge, and is interred there at Christ Episcopal Church Cemetery.

Charles Goldsborough was the great-grandfather of Thomas Alan Goldsborough and Winder Laird Henry.

U.S. House of Representatives
Preceded by John Dennis	U.S. Congressman, Maryland's 8th District; 1805—1817	Succeeded by Thomas Bayly
Political offices
Preceded by Charles Carnan Ridgely	Governor of Maryland; 1819	Succeeded by Samuel Sprigg
