= List of United States representatives in the 53rd Congress =

This is a complete list of United States representatives during the 53rd United States Congress listed by seniority.

As a historical article, the districts and party affiliations listed reflect those during the 53rd Congress (March 4, 1893 – March 3, 1895). Seats and party affiliations on similar lists for other congresses will be different for certain members.

Seniority depends on the date on which members were sworn into office. Since many members are sworn in on the same day, subsequent ranking is based on previous congressional service of the individual and then by alphabetical order by the last name of the representative.

Committee chairmanship in the House is often associated with seniority. However, party leadership is typically not associated with seniority.

Note: The "*" indicates that the representative/delegate may have served one or more non-consecutive terms while in the House of Representatives of the United States Congress.

== U.S. House seniority list ==
U.S. House seniority
Rank	Representative	Party	District	Seniority date (Previous service, if any)	No.# of term(s)	Notes
1	Richard P. Bland	D	MO-08	March 4, 1873	11th term	Dean of the House; Left the House in 1895.
2	Charles O'Neill	R	PA-02	March 4, 1873; Previous service, 1863–1871.	15th term*	Died on November 25, 1893.
3	David B. Culberson	D	TX-04	March 4, 1875	10th term	
4	Thomas J. Henderson	R	IL-07	March 4, 1875	10th term	Left the House in 1895.
5	William McKendree Springer	D	IL-13	March 4, 1875	10th term	Left the House in 1895.
6	Alfred C. Harmer	R	PA-05	March 4, 1877; Previous service, 1871–1875.	12th term*	
7	Thomas Brackett Reed	R	ME-01	March 4, 1877	9th term	
8	Henry H. Bingham	R	PA-01	March 4, 1879	8th term	
9	William H. Hatch	D	MO-01	March 4, 1879	8th term	Left the House in 1895.
10	Benton McMillin	D	TN-04	March 4, 1879	8th term	
11	Newton C. Blanchard	D	LA-04	March 4, 1881	7th term	Resigned on March 12, 1894.
12	William S. Holman	D	IN-04	March 4, 1881; Previous service, 1859–1865 and 1867–1877.	15th term**	Left the House in 1895.
13	William C. Oates	D	AL-03	March 4, 1881	7th term	Resigned on November 5, 1894.
14	Henry G. Turner	D	GA-11	March 4, 1881	7th term	
15	Nelson Dingley, Jr.	R	ME-02	September 12, 1881	7th term	
16	Robert R. Hitt	R	IL-06	December 4, 1882	7th term	
17	Charles A. Boutelle	R	ME-04	March 4, 1883	6th term	
18	Clifton R. Breckinridge	D	AR-02	March 4, 1883	6th term	Resigned on August 14, 1894.
19	Charles Frederick Crisp	D	GA-03	March 4, 1883	6th term	Speaker of the House
20	Alexander Monroe Dockery	D	MO-03	March 4, 1883	6th term	
21	David B. Henderson	R	IA-03	March 4, 1883	6th term	
22	Seth L. Milliken	R	ME-03	March 4, 1883	6th term	
23	William Lyne Wilson	D	WV-02	March 4, 1883	6th term	Left the House in 1895.
24	Edward H. Funston	R	KS-02	March 21, 1884	6th term	Resigned on August 2, 1894.
25	Charles Triplett O'Ferrall	D	VA-07	May 5, 1884	6th term	Resigned on December 28, 1893.
26	John Mills Allen	D	MS-01	March 4, 1885	5th term	
27	William Campbell Preston Breckinridge	D	KY-07	March 4, 1885	5th term	Left the House in 1895.
28	Julius C. Burrows	R	MI-03	March 4, 1885; Previous service, 1873–1875 and 1879–1883.	8th term**	Resigned on January 23, 1895.
29	William D. Bynum	D	IN-07	March 4, 1885	5th term	Left the House in 1895.
30	Thomas C. Catchings	D	MS-03	March 4, 1885	5th term	
31	William H. Crain	D	TX-11	March 4, 1885	5th term	
32	William W. Grout	R	VT-02	March 4, 1885; Previous service, 1881–1883.	6th term*	
33	John T. Heard	D	MO-07	March 4, 1885	5th term	Left the House in 1895.
34	John S. Henderson	D	NC-07	March 4, 1885	5th term	Left the House in 1895.
35	Binger Hermann	R	OR-01	March 4, 1885	5th term	
36	James B. McCreary	D	KY-08	March 4, 1885	5th term	
37	Joseph H. Outhwaite	D	OH-12	March 4, 1885	5th term	Left the House in 1895.
38	James D. Richardson	D	TN-05	March 4, 1885	5th term	
39	Joseph D. Sayers	D	TX-09	March 4, 1885	5th term	
40	William Johnson Stone	D	KY-01	March 4, 1885	5th term	Left the House in 1895.
41	Joseph Wheeler	D	AL-08	March 4, 1885; Previous service, 1881–1882 and 1883.	8th term**	
42	Albert J. Hopkins	R	IL-05	December 7, 1885	5th term	
43	Thomas Chipman McRae	D	AR-03	December 7, 1885	5th term	
44	Harry Welles Rusk	D	MD-03	November 2, 1886	5th term	
44	Joseph Abbott	D	TX-06	March 4, 1887	4th term	
45	John H. Bankhead	D	AL-06	March 4, 1887	4th term	
46	Asher G. Caruth	D	KY-05	March 4, 1887	4th term	Left the House in 1895.
47	John Logan Chipman	D	MI-01	March 4, 1887	4th term	Died on August 17, 1893.
48	James E. Cobb	D	AL-05	March 4, 1887	4th term	
49	William Cogswell	R	MA-06	March 4, 1887	4th term	
50	John Dalzell	R	PA-22	March 4, 1887	4th term	
51	Benjamin A. Enloe	D	TN-08	March 4, 1887	4th term	Left the House in 1895.
52	Ashbel P. Fitch	D	NY-15	March 4, 1887	4th term	Resigned on December 26, 1893.
53	Nils P. Haugen	D	WI-10	March 4, 1887	4th term	Left the House in 1895.
54	Walter I. Hayes	D	IA-02	March 4, 1887	4th term	Left the House in 1895.
55	Charles E. Hooker	D	MS-07	March 4, 1887; Previous service, 1875–1883.	8th term*	Left the House in 1895.
56	Constantine B. Kilgore	D	TX-03	March 4, 1887	4th term	Left the House in 1895.
57	Edward Lane	D	IL-17	March 4, 1887	4th term	Left the House in 1895.
58	Alexander B. Montgomery	D	KY-04	March 4, 1887	4th term	Left the House in 1895.
59	Philip S. Post	R	IL-10	March 4, 1887	4th term	Died on January 6, 1895.
60	Charles Addison Russell	R	CT-03	March 4, 1887	4th term	
61	T. R. Stockdale	D	MS-06	March 4, 1887	4th term	Left the House in 1895.
62	Joseph E. Washington	D	TN-06	March 4, 1887	4th term	
63	Justin Rice Whiting	D	MI-07	March 4, 1887	4th term	Left the House in 1895.
64	Charles Tracey	D	NY-20	November 8, 1887	4th term	Left the House in 1895.
65	James J. Belden	R	NY-27	November 8, 1887	4th term	Left the House in 1895.
66	Samuel Matthews Robertson	D	LA-06	December 5, 1887	4th term	
67	John D. Alderson	D	WV-03	March 4, 1889	3rd term	Left the House in 1895.
68	Charles Barwig	D	WI-02	March 4, 1889	3rd term	Left the House in 1895.
69	Charles J. Boatner	D	LA-05	March 4, 1889	3rd term	
70	George H. Brickner	D	WI-05	March 4, 1889	3rd term	Left the House in 1895.
71	Elijah V. Brookshire	D	IN-08	March 4, 1889	3rd term	Left the House in 1895.
72	Marriott Henry Brosius	R	PA-10	March 4, 1889	3rd term	
73	Jason B. Brown	D	IN-03	March 4, 1889	3rd term	Left the House in 1895.
74	Benjamin H. Bunn	D	NC-04	March 4, 1889	3rd term	Left the House in 1895.
75	John A. Caldwell	R	OH-02	March 4, 1889	3rd term	Resigned on May 4, 1894.
76	John Michael Clancy	D	NY-02	March 4, 1889	3rd term	Left the House in 1895.
77	Richard Henry Clarke	D	AL-01	March 4, 1889	3rd term	
78	George W. Cooper	D	IN-05	March 4, 1889	3rd term	Left the House in 1895.
79	James W. Covert	D	NY-01	March 4, 1889; Previous service, 1877–1881.	5th term*	Left the House in 1895.
80	Jonathan P. Dolliver	R	IA-10	March 4, 1889	3rd term	
81	Edward J. Dunphy	D	NY-08	March 4, 1889	3rd term	Left the House in 1895.
82	Paul C. Edmunds	D	VA-06	March 4, 1889	3rd term	Left the House in 1895.
83	William Thomas Ellis	D	KY-02	March 4, 1889	3rd term	Left the House in 1895.
84	George W. Fithian	D	IL-16	March 4, 1889	3rd term	Left the House in 1895.
85	William St. John Forman	D	IL-18	March 4, 1889	3rd term	Left the House in 1895.
86	Jacob Augustus Geissenhainer	D	NJ-03	March 4, 1889	3rd term	Left the House in 1895.
87	Isaac Goodnight	D	KY-03	March 4, 1889	3rd term	Left the House in 1895.
88	Rufus E. Lester	D	GA-01	March 4, 1889	3rd term	
89	Thomas F. Magner	D	NY-06	March 4, 1889	3rd term	Left the House in 1895.
90	Augustus N. Martin	D	IN-11	March 4, 1889	3rd term	Left the House in 1895.
91	Elijah A. Morse	R	MA-12	March 4, 1889	3rd term	
92	William Mutchler	D	PA-08	March 4, 1889; Previous service, 1875–1877 and 1881–1885.	6th term**	Died on June 23, 1893.
93	Joseph H. O'Neil	R	MA-09	March 4, 1889	3rd term	Left the House in 1895.
94	Thomas H. Paynter	D	KY-09	March 4, 1889	3rd term	Resigned on January 5, 1895.
95	Charles S. Randall	R	MA-13	March 4, 1889	3rd term	Left the House in 1895.
96	James Bernard Reilly	D	PA-13	March 4, 1889; Previous service, 1875–1879.	5th term*	Left the House in 1895.
97	George W. Smith	R	IL-20	March 4, 1889	3rd term	
98	Samuel M. Stephenson	R	MI-12	March 4, 1889	3rd term	
99	John Charles Tarsney	D	MO-05	March 4, 1889	3rd term	
100	Alfred A. Taylor	R	TN-01	March 4, 1889	3rd term	Left the House in 1895.
101	Henry St. George Tucker III	D	VA-10	March 4, 1889	3rd term	
102	Joseph H. Walker	R	MA-03	March 4, 1889	3rd term	
103	Myron Benjamin Wright	R	PA-15	March 4, 1889	3rd term	Died on November 13, 1894.
104	John Pickler	R	SD	November 2, 1889	3rd term	
105	Amos J. Cummings	D	NY-11	November 5, 1889; Previous service, 1887–1889.	4th term*	Resigned on November 21, 1894.
106	John L. Wilson	R	WA	November 20, 1889	3rd term	Resigned on February 18, 1895.
107	Sereno E. Payne	R	NY-28	December 2, 1889; Previous service, 1883–1887.	5th term*	
108	Andrew Price	D	LA-03	December 2, 1889	3rd term	
109	James R. Williams	D	IL-19	December 2, 1889	3rd term	Left the House in 1895.
110	John E. Reyburn	R	PA-04	February 18, 1890	3rd term	
111	Willis Sweet	R	ID	October 1, 1890	3rd term	Left the House in 1895.
112	Charles Warren Stone	R	PA-27	November 4, 1890	3rd term	
113	Thomas J. Geary	D	CA-01	December 9, 1890	3rd term	Left the House in 1895.
114	Sydenham Benoni Alexander	D	NC-06	March 4, 1891	2nd term	Left the House in 1895.
115	Marshall Arnold	D	MO-14	March 4, 1891	2nd term	Left the House in 1895.
116	Joseph Weldon Bailey	D	TX-05	March 4, 1891	2nd term	
117	William Baker	P	KS-06	March 4, 1891	2nd term	
118	Frank Eckels Beltzhoover	D	PA-19	March 4, 1891; Previous service, 1879–1883.	4th term*	
119	William W. Bowers	R	CA-07	March 4, 1891	2nd term	
120	William A. B. Branch	D	NC-01	March 4, 1891	2nd term	Left the House in 1895.
121	William H. Brawley	D	SC-01	March 4, 1891	2nd term	Resigned on February 12, 1894.
122	John L. Bretz	D	IN-02	March 4, 1891	2nd term	Left the House in 1895.
123	Case Broderick	R	KS-01	March 4, 1891	2nd term	
124	William Jennings Bryan	D	NE-01	March 4, 1891	2nd term	Left the House in 1895.
125	Cornelius A. Cadmus	D	NJ-05	March 4, 1891	2nd term	Left the House in 1895.
126	Anthony Caminetti	D	CA-02	March 4, 1891	2nd term	Left the House in 1895.
127	Timothy J. Campbell	D	NY-09	March 4, 1891; Previous service, 1885–1889.	4th term*	Left the House in 1895.
128	James Capehart	D	WV-04	March 4, 1891	2nd term	Left the House in 1895.
129	John W. Causey	D	DE	March 4, 1891	2nd term	Left the House in 1895.
130	Seth Wallace Cobb	D	MO-12	March 4, 1891	2nd term	
131	William J. Coombs	D	NY-04	March 4, 1891	2nd term	Left the House in 1895.
132	Barnes Compton	D	MD-05	March 4, 1891; Previous service, 1885–1890.	5th term*	Resigned on May 15, 1894.
133	Nicholas N. Cox	D	TN-07	March 4, 1891	2nd term	
134	William T. Crawford	D	NC-09	March 4, 1891	2nd term	Left the House in 1895.
135	John Davis	P	KS-05	March 4, 1891	2nd term	Left the House in 1895.
136	David A. De Armond	D	MO-06	March 4, 1891	2nd term	
137	Robert E. De Forest	D	CT-04	March 4, 1891	2nd term	
138	John De Witt Warner	D	NY-13	March 4, 1891	2nd term	Left the House in 1895.
139	Dennis D. Donovan	D	OH-05	March 4, 1891	2nd term	Left the House in 1895.
140	Allan C. Durborow, Jr.	D	IL-03	March 4, 1891	2nd term	Left the House in 1895.
141	Thomas Dunn English	D	NJ-06	March 4, 1891	2nd term	Left the House in 1895.
142	William H. Enochs	R	OH-10	March 4, 1891	2nd term	Died on July 13, 1893.
143	James F. Epes	D	VA-04	March 4, 1891	2nd term	Left the House in 1895.
144	John R. Fellows	D	NY-14	March 4, 1891	2nd term	Resigned on December 31, 1893.
145	Robert Washington Fyan	D	MO-13	March 4, 1891; Previous service, 1883–1885.	3rd term*	Left the House in 1895.
146	James S. Gorman	D	MI-02	March 4, 1891	2nd term	Left the House in 1895.
147	Benjamin F. Grady	D	NC-03	March 4, 1891	2nd term	Left the House in 1895.
148	Henry U. Johnson	R	IN-06	March 4, 1891	2nd term	
149	Osee M. Hall	D	MN-03	March 4, 1891	2nd term	Left the House in 1895.
150	Darius D. Hare	D	OH-13	March 4, 1891	2nd term	Left the House in 1895.
151	Michael D. Harter	D	OH-14	March 4, 1891	2nd term	Left the House in 1895.
152	Warren B. Hooker	R	NY-34	March 4, 1891	2nd term	
153	Albert Cole Hopkins	R	PA-16	March 4, 1891	2nd term	Left the House in 1895.
154	George W. Houk	D	OH-03	March 4, 1891	2nd term	Died on February 9, 1894.
155	John A. T. Hull	R	IA-07	March 4, 1891	2nd term	
156	Martin N. Johnson	R	ND	March 4, 1891	2nd term	
157	Tom L. Johnson	D	OH-21	March 4, 1891	2nd term	Left the House in 1895.
158	William Atkinson Jones	D	VA-01	March 4, 1891	2nd term	
159	Omer Madison Kem	P	NE-06	March 4, 1891	2nd term	
160	George Frederic Kribbs	D	PA-28	March 4, 1891	2nd term	Left the House in 1895.
161	John C. Kyle	D	MS-02	March 4, 1891	2nd term	
162	Oscar Lapham	D	RI-01	March 4, 1891	2nd term	Left the House in 1895.
163	Thomas G. Lawson	D	GA-08	March 4, 1891	2nd term	
164	Fernando C. Layton	D	OH-04	March 4, 1891	2nd term	
165	Leonidas F. Livingston	D	GA-05	March 4, 1891	2nd term	
166	Daniel N. Lockwood	D	NY-32	March 4, 1891; Previous service, 1877–1879.	3rd term*	Left the House in 1895.
167	Eugene F. Loud	R	CA-05	March 4, 1891	2nd term	
168	Thomas Lynch	D	WI-09	March 4, 1891	2nd term	Left the House in 1895.
169	Stephen Mallory II	D	FL-01	March 4, 1891	2nd term	Left the House in 1895.
170	William McAleer	D	PA-03	March 4, 1891	2nd term	Left the House in 1895.
171	Lawrence E. McGann	D	IL-02	March 4, 1891	2nd term	
172	William M. McKaig	D	MD-06	March 4, 1891	2nd term	Left the House in 1895.
173	William A. McKeighan	P	NE-05	March 4, 1891	2nd term	Left the House in 1895.
174	Adolph Meyer	D	LA-01	March 4, 1891	2nd term	
175	Charles L. Moses	D	GA-04	March 4, 1891	2nd term	
176	Josiah Patterson	D	TN-10	March 4, 1891	2nd term	
177	Albert J. Pearson	D	OH-16	March 4, 1891	2nd term	Left the House in 1895.
178	John O. Pendleton	D	WV-01	March 4, 1891; Previous service, 1889–1890.	3rd term*	Left the House in 1895.
179	George D. Perkins	R	IA-11	March 4, 1891	2nd term	
180	H. Henry Powers	R	VT-01	March 4, 1891	2nd term	
181	George W. Ray	R	NY-26	March 4, 1891; Previous service, 1883–1885.	3rd term*	
182	Isidor Rayner	D	MD-04	March 4, 1891; Previous service, 1887–1889.	3rd term*	Left the House in 1895.
183	John Buchanan Robinson	R	PA-06	March 4, 1891	2nd term	
184	George W. Shell	D	SC-04	March 4, 1891	2nd term	Left the House in 1895.
185	Jerry Simpson	P	KS-07	March 4, 1891	2nd term	Left the House in 1895.
186	Lewis Sperry	P	CT-01	March 4, 1891	2nd term	Left the House in 1895.
187	Henry C. Snodgrass	D	TN-03	March 4, 1891	2nd term	Left the House in 1895.
188	Moses T. Stevens	D	MA-05	March 4, 1891	2nd term	Left the House in 1895.
189	William A. Stone	R	PA-23	March 4, 1891	2nd term	
190	Bellamy Storer	R	OH-01	March 4, 1891	2nd term	Left the House in 1895.
191	William L. Terry	D	AR-04	March 4, 1891	2nd term	
192	Louis Washington Turpin	D	AL-09	March 4, 1891; Previous service, 1889–1890.	3rd term*	Left the House in 1895.
193	James Wolcott Wadsworth	R	NY-30	March 4, 1891; Previous service, 1881–1885.	4th term*	
194	Daniel W. Waugh	R	IN-09	March 4, 1891	2nd term	Left the House in 1895.
195	Thomas A. E. Weadock	D	MI-10	March 4, 1891	2nd term	Left the House in 1895.
196	John M. Wever	R	NY-23	March 4, 1891	2nd term	Left the House in 1895.
197	George D. Wise	D	VA-03	March 4, 1891; Previous service, 1881–1890.	7th term*	Left the House in 1895.
198	Simon Peter Wolverton	D	PA-17	March 4, 1891	2nd term	Left the House in 1895.
199	William Bourke Cockran	D	NY-12	November 3, 1891; Previous service, 1887–1889.	3rd term*	Left the House in 1895.
200	Newton M. Curtis	R	NY-22	November 3, 1891	2nd term	
201	John C. Houk	R	TN-02	December 7, 1891	2nd term	Left the House in 1895.
202	Elisha E. Meredith	D	VA-08	December 9, 1891	2nd term	
203	Samuel G. Hilborn	R	CA-03	December 5, 1892	2nd term	Resigned on April 4, 1894.
204	John L. McLaurin	D	SC-06	December 5, 1892	2nd term	
205	William Allen Sipe	D	PA-24	December 5, 1892	2nd term	Left the House in 1895.
206	Silas Adams	R	KY-11	March 4, 1893	1st term	Left the House in 1895.
207	David D. Aitken	R	MI-06	March 4, 1893	1st term	
208	J. Frank Aldrich	R	IL-01	March 4, 1893	1st term	
209	Lewis D. Apsley	R	MA-04	March 4, 1893	1st term	
210	John Avery	R	MI-11	March 4, 1893	1st term	
211	Joseph W. Babcock	R	WI-03	March 4, 1893	1st term	
212	Henry Moore Baker	R	NH-02	March 4, 1893	1st term	
213	Melvin Baldwin	D	MN-06	March 4, 1893	1st term	Left the House in 1895.
214	Lyman E. Barnes	D	WI-08	March 4, 1893	1st term	Left the House in 1895.
215	Franklin Bartlett	D	NY-07	March 4, 1893	1st term	
216	Richard Bartholdt	R	MO-10	March 4, 1893	1st term	
217	Charles K. Bell	D	TX-08	March 4, 1893	1st term	
218	John Calhoun Bell	P	CO-02	March 4, 1893	1st term	
219	Albert S. Berry	D	KY-06	March 4, 1893	1st term	
220	James C. C. Black	D	GA-10	March 4, 1893	1st term	Left the House in 1895.
221	John C. Black	D	IL	March 4, 1893	1st term	Resigned on January 12, 1895.
222	Henry W. Blair	R	NH-01	March 4, 1893; Previous service, 1875–1879.	3rd term*	Left the House in 1895.
223	Robert Franklin Brattan	D	MD-01	March 4, 1893	1st term	Died on May 10, 1894.
224	Haldor Boen	P	MN-07	March 4, 1893	1st term	Left the House in 1895.
225	William H. Bower	D	NC-08	March 4, 1893	1st term	Left the House in 1895.
226	Daniel Dee Burnes	D	MO-04	March 4, 1893	1st term	Left the House in 1895.
227	Thomas Banks Cabaniss	D	GA-06	March 4, 1893	1st term	Left the House in 1895.
228	Joseph Gurney Cannon	R	IL-15	March 4, 1893; Previous service, 1873–1891.	11th term*	
229	Marion Cannon	P	CA-06	March 4, 1893	1st term	Left the House in 1895.
230	Charles A. Chickering	R	NY-24	March 4, 1893	1st term	
231	Robert A. Childs	R	IL-08	March 4, 1893	1st term	Left the House in 1895.
232	Champ Clark	D	MO-09	March 4, 1893	1st term	Left the House in 1895.
233	Jeremiah V. Cockrell	D	TX-13	March 4, 1893	1st term	
234	Henry A. Coffeen	D	WY	March 4, 1893	1st term	Left the House in 1895.
235	Charles G. Conn	D	IN-13	March 4, 1893	1st term	Left the House in 1895.
236	Charles M. Cooper	D	FL-02	March 4, 1893	1st term	
237	Henry Allen Cooper	R	WI-01	March 4, 1893	1st term	
238	Samuel B. Cooper	D	TX-02	March 4, 1893	1st term	
239	Johnston Cornish	D	NJ-04	March 4, 1893	1st term	Left the House in 1895.
240	Robert G. Cousins	R	IA-05	March 4, 1893	1st term	
241	Charles Curtis	R	KS-04	March 4, 1893	1st term	
242	Charles Daniels	R	NY-33	March 4, 1893	1st term	
243	Robert C. Davey	D	LA-02	March 4, 1893	1st term	Left the House in 1895.
244	William Henry Denson	D	AL-07	March 4, 1893	1st term	Left the House in 1895.
245	Hugh A. Dinsmore	D	AR-05	March 4, 1893	1st term	
246	William H. Doolittle	R	WA	March 4, 1893	1st term	
247	William F. Draper	R	MA-11	March 4, 1893	1st term	
248	John T. Dunn	D	NJ-08	March 4, 1893	1st term	Left the House in 1895.
249	William R. Ellis	R	OR-02	March 4, 1893	1st term	
250	Constantine Jacob Erdman	D	PA-09	March 4, 1893	1st term	
251	George Bragg Fielder	D	NJ-07	March 4, 1893	1st term	Left the House in 1895.
252	Loren Fletcher	R	MN-05	March 4, 1893	1st term	
253	Benjamin F. Funk	R	IL-14	March 4, 1893	1st term	Left the House in 1895.
254	John J. Gardner	R	NJ-02	March 4, 1893	1st term	
255	John H. Gear	R	IA-01	March 4, 1893; Previous service, 1887–1891.	3rd term*	Left the House in 1895.
256	Charles W. Gillet	R	NY-29	March 4, 1893	1st term	
257	Frederick H. Gillett	R	MA-02	March 4, 1893	1st term	
258	Julius Goldzier	D	IL-04	March 4, 1893	1st term	Left the House in 1895.
259	John H. Graham	D	NY-05	March 4, 1893	1st term	Left the House in 1895.
260	Walter Gresham	D	TX-10	March 4, 1893	1st term	Left the House in 1895.
261	Charles H. Grosvenor	R	OH-11	March 4, 1893; Previous service, 1885–1891.	4th term*	
262	Alva L. Hager	R	IA-09	March 4, 1893	1st term	
263	Eugene Jerome Hainer	R	NE-04	March 4, 1893	1st term	
264	Charles Delemere Haines	D	NY-19	March 4, 1893	1st term	Left the House in 1895.
265	Uriel Sebree Hall	D	MO-02	March 4, 1893	1st term	
266	Thomas Hammond	D	IN-10	March 4, 1893	1st term	Left the House in 1895.
267	Charles S. Hartman	R	MT	March 4, 1893	1st term	
268	William A. Harris	P	KS	March 4, 1893	1st term	Left the House in 1895.
269	Daniel B. Heiner	R	PA-21	March 4, 1893	1st term	
270	Joseph C. Hendrix	D	NY-03	March 4, 1893	1st term	Left the House in 1895.
271	William Peters Hepburn	R	IA-08	March 4, 1893; Previous service, 1881–1887.	4th term*	
272	Josiah Duane Hicks	R	PA-20	March 4, 1893	1st term	
273	William Henry Hines	D	PA-12	March 4, 1893	1st term	Left the House in 1895.
274	Thomas Jefferson Hudson	P	KS-03	March 4, 1893	1st term	Left the House in 1895.
275	George W. Hulick	R	OH-06	March 4, 1893	1st term	
276	Andrew J. Hunter	D	IL	March 4, 1893	1st term	Left the House in 1895.
277	Joseph Chappell Hutcheson	D	TX-01	March 4, 1893	1st term	
278	George P. Ikirt	D	OH-18	March 4, 1893	1st term	Left the House in 1895.
279	Charles Frederick Joy	R	MO-11	March 4, 1893	1st term	Resigned on April 3, 1894.
280	Andrew Kiefer	R	MN-04	March 4, 1893	1st term	
281	John F. Lacey	R	IA-06	March 4, 1893; Previous service, 1889–1891.	2nd term*	
282	Asbury Latimer	D	SC-03	March 4, 1893	1st term	
283	Jacob LeFever	R	NY-18	March 4, 1893	1st term	
284	William Lilly	R	PA	March 4, 1893	1st term	Died on December 1, 1893.
285	William S. Linton	R	MI-08	March 4, 1893	1st term	
286	Marcus C. Lisle	D	KY-10	March 4, 1893	1st term	Died on July 7, 1894.
287	Henry C. Loudenslager	R	NJ-01	March 4, 1893	1st term	
288	William V. Lucas	R	SD	March 4, 1893	1st term	Left the House in 1895.
289	John W. Maddox	D	GA-07	March 4, 1893	1st term	
290	James G. Maguire	D	CA-04	March 4, 1893	1st term	
291	Thaddeus Maclay Mahon	R	PA-18	March 4, 1893	1st term	
292	Benjamin F. Marsh	R	IL-11	March 4, 1893; Previous service, 1877–1883.	4th term*	
293	James William Marshall	D	VA-09	March 4, 1893	1st term	Left the House in 1895.
294	Francis Marvin	R	NY-17	March 4, 1893	1st term	Left the House in 1895.
295	Samuel W. McCall	R	MA-08	March 4, 1893	1st term	
296	James McCleary	R	MN-02	March 4, 1893	1st term	
297	Philip D. McCulloch, Jr.	D	AR-01	March 4, 1893	1st term	
298	John James McDannold	D	IL-12	March 4, 1893	1st term	Left the House in 1895.
299	James C. McDearmon	D	TN-09	March 4, 1893	1st term	
300	Alexander McDowell	R	PA	March 4, 1893	1st term	Left the House in 1895.
301	Michael J. McEttrick	D	MA-10	March 4, 1893	1st term	Left the House in 1895.
302	William F. McNagny	D	IN-12	March 4, 1893	1st term	Left the House in 1895.
303	George de Rue Meiklejohn	R	NE-03	March 4, 1893	1st term	
304	David Henry Mercer	R	NE-02	March 4, 1893	1st term	
305	Hernando Money	D	MS-04	March 4, 1893; Previous service, 1875–1885.	6th term*	
306	John W. Moon	R	MI-09	March 4, 1893	1st term	Left the House in 1895.
307	Charles Henry Morgan	D	MO-15	March 4, 1893; Previous service, 1875–1879 and 1883–1885.	4th term**	Left the House in 1895.
308	George W. Murray	R	SC-07	March 4, 1893	1st term	Left the House in 1895.
309	Robert Neill	D	AR-06	March 4, 1893	1st term	
310	Stephen A. Northway	R	OH-19	March 4, 1893	1st term	
311	Francis G. Newlands	D	NV	March 4, 1893	1st term	
312	Thomas M. Paschal	D	TX-12	March 4, 1893	1st term	Left the House in 1895.
313	Lafe Pence	P	CO-01	March 4, 1893	1st term	Left the House in 1895.
314	George C. Pendleton	D	TX-07	March 4, 1893	1st term	
315	Thomas Wharton Phillips	R	PA-25	March 4, 1893	1st term	
316	James P. Pigott	D	CT-02	March 4, 1893	1st term	Left the House in 1895.
317	James A. D. Richards	D	OH-17	March 4, 1893	1st term	Left the House in 1895.
318	George F. Richardson	D	MI-05	March 4, 1893	1st term	Left the House in 1895.
319	Byron F. Ritchie	D	OH-09	March 4, 1893	1st term	Left the House in 1895.
320	Gaston A. Robbins	D	AL-04	March 4, 1893	1st term	
321	Benjamin E. Russell	D	GA-02	March 4, 1893	1st term	
322	William Ryan	D	NY-16	March 4, 1893	1st term	Left the House in 1895.
323	Simon J. Schermerhorn	D	NY-21	March 4, 1893	1st term	Left the House in 1895.
324	Joseph A. Scranton	R	PA-11	March 4, 1893; Previous service, 1881–1883, 1885–1887 and 1889–1891.	4th term***	
325	Thomas Settle	R	NC-05	March 4, 1893	1st term	
326	George B. Shaw	R	WI-07	March 4, 1893	1st term	Died on August 27, 1894.
327	James S. Sherman	R	NY-25	March 4, 1893; Previous service, 1887–1891.	3rd term*	
328	Joseph C. Sibley	D	PA-26	March 4, 1893	1st term	Left the House in 1895.
329	Daniel Sickles	D	NY-10	March 4, 1893; Previous service, 1857–1861.	3rd term*	Left the House in 1895.
330	Jesse F. Stallings	D	AL-02	March 4, 1893	1st term	
331	Thomas J. Strait	D	SC-05	March 4, 1893	1st term	
332	Luther M. Strong	R	OH-08	March 4, 1893	1st term	
333	Claude A. Swanson	D	VA-05	March 4, 1893	1st term	
334	W. Jasper Talbert	D	SC-02	March 4, 1893	1st term	
335	Joshua Frederick Cockey Talbott	D	MD-02	March 4, 1893; Previous service, 1879–1885.	4th term*	Left the House in 1895.
336	Farish Carter Tate	D	GA-09	March 4, 1893	1st term	
337	James Albertus Tawney	R	MN-01	March 4, 1893	1st term	
338	Arthur H. Taylor	D	IN-01	March 4, 1893	1st term	Left the House in 1895.
339	Henry F. Thomas	R	MI-04	March 4, 1893	1st term	
340	David Gardiner Tyler	D	VA-02	March 4, 1893	1st term	
341	Thomas Updegraff	R	IA-04	March 4, 1893; Previous service, 1879–1883.	3rd term*	
342	H. Clay Van Voorhis	R	OH-15	March 4, 1893	1st term	
343	John Van Voorhis	R	NY-31	March 4, 1893; Previous service, 1879–1883.	3rd term*	Left the House in 1895.
344	Irving Price Wanger	R	PA-07	March 4, 1893	1st term	
345	Owen A. Wells	D	WI-06	March 4, 1893	1st term	Left the House in 1895.
346	Hamilton K. Wheeler	R	IL-09	March 4, 1893	1st term	Left the House in 1895.
347	William J. White	R	OH-20	March 4, 1893	1st term	Left the House in 1895.
348	John Sharp Williams	D	MS-05	March 4, 1893	1st term	
349	George W. Wilson	R	OH-07	March 4, 1893	1st term	
350	Ashley B. Wright	R	MA-01	March 4, 1893	1st term	
351	Frederick Augustus Woodard	D	NC-02	March 4, 1893	1st term	
352	Ephraim Milton Woomer	R	PA-14	March 4, 1893	1st term	
	Charles H. Page	D	RI-02	April 5, 1893; Previous service, 1887 and 1891–1893.	3rd term**	Left the House in 1895.
	William Everett	D	MA-07	April 25, 1893	1st term	Left the House in 1895.
	Howard Mutchler	D	PA-08	August 7, 1893	1st term	Left the House in 1895.
	Peter J. Somers	D	WI-04	August 27, 1893	1st term	Left the House in 1895.
	Hezekiah S. Bundy	R	OH-10	December 4, 1893; Previous service, 1865–1867 and 1873–1875.	3rd term**	Left the House in 1895.
	Levi T. Griffin	R	MI-01	December 5, 1893	1st term	Left the House in 1895.
	Robert Adams, Jr.	R	PA-02	December 19, 1893	1st term	
	Lemuel E. Quigg	R	NY-14	January 30, 1894	1st term	
	Isidor Straus	D	NY-15	January 30, 1894	1st term	Left the House in 1895.
	Smith S. Turner	D	VA-07	January 30, 1894	1st term	
	Galusha A. Grow	R	PA	February 26, 1894; Previous service, 1851–1863.	7th term*	
	John J. O'Neill	R	MO-11	April 3, 1894; Previous service, 1883–1889 and 1891–1893.	5th term**	Left the House in 1895.
	Warren B. English	D	CA-03	April 4, 1894	1st term	Left the House in 1895.
	James F. Izlar	D	SC-01	April 12, 1894	1st term	Left the House in 1895.
	Henry Warren Ogden	D	LA-04	May 12, 1894	1st term	
	Paul J. Sorg	D	OH-03	May 21, 1894	1st term	
	Horace Ladd Moore	D	KS-02	August 2, 1894	1st term	Left the House in 1895.
	Michael Griffin	R	WI-07	November 5, 1894	1st term	
	George Paul Harrison, Jr.	D	AL-03	November 6, 1894	1st term	
	Charles Edward Coffin	R	MD-05	November 6, 1894	1st term	
	Winder Laird Henry	D	MD-01	November 6, 1894	1st term	Left the House in 1895.
	William M. Beckner	D	KY-10	December 3, 1894	1st term	Left the House in 1895.
	Jacob H. Bromwell	R	OH-02	December 3, 1894	1st term	
	John Sebastian Little	D	AR-02	December 3, 1894	1st term	
	Edwin J. Jorden	R	PA-15	February 23, 1895	1st term	Left the House in 1895.

== Delegates ==
Rank	Delegate	Party	District	Seniority date (Previous service, if any)	No.# of term(s)	Notes
1	Antonio Joseph	D	NM	March 4, 1885	5th term	
2	Marcus A. Smith	D	AZ	March 4, 1887	4th term	
3	Dennis Thomas Flynn	R	OK	March 4, 1893	1st term	
4	Joseph L. Rawlins	D	UT	March 4, 1893	1st term	

== See also ==
- 53rd United States Congress
- List of United States congressional districts
- List of United States senators in the 53rd Congress
