= George F. Huff =

American politician (1842–1912)

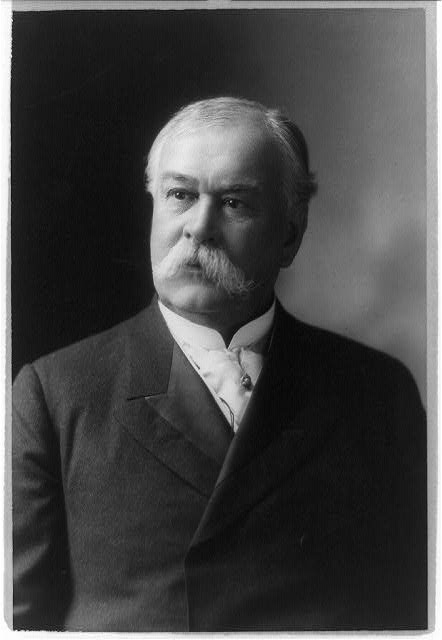

Member of the U.S. House of Representatives from Pennsylvania
- In office March 4, 1903 – March 3, 1911
- Preceded by: John Dalzell
- Succeeded by: Curtis H. Gregg
- Constituency: 22nd district
- In office March 4, 1895 – March 3, 1897 Serving with Galusha A. Grow
- Preceded by: Alexander McDowell
- Succeeded by: Samuel A. Davenport
- Constituency: at-large
- In office March 4, 1891 – March 3, 1893
- Preceded by: Samuel Alfred Craig
- Succeeded by: Daniel B. Heiner
- Constituency: 21st district

Member of the Pennsylvania State Senate from the 39th district
- In office December 1, 1884 – December 1, 1888
- Preceded by: H. P. Laird
- Succeeded by: Edward E. Robbins

Personal details
- Born: July 16, 1842 Norristown, Pennsylvania
- Died: April 18, 1912 (aged 69) Washington, D.C.
- Party: Republican
- Spouse: Henrietta Burrell (m. 1871)

George Franklin Huff (July 16, 1842 – April 18, 1912) was a Republican member of the U.S. House of Representatives from Pennsylvania.

== Biography ==
George F. Huff was born in Norristown, Pennsylvania. He attended the public schools in Middletown, Pennsylvania, and later in Altoona, Pennsylvania. At the age of eighteen he worked for the Pennsylvania Railroad car shops in Altoona.

He moved to Westmoreland County, Pennsylvania, in 1867 and engaged in banking in Greensburg, Pennsylvania. He later became largely identified with the industrial and mining interests of western Pennsylvania. He was a delegate to the 1880 Republican National Convention. He was a member of the Pennsylvania State Senate from 1884 to 1888.

Huff was elected as a Republican to the Fifty-second Congress. He was again elected to the Fifty-fourth Congress. He was not a candidate for renomination in 1896.

Huff was again elected to the Fifty-eighth and to the three succeeding Congresses. He served as chairman of the United States House Committee on Mines and Mining during the Sixtieth and Sixty-first Congresses. He was not a candidate for renomination in 1910.

== Personal life ==
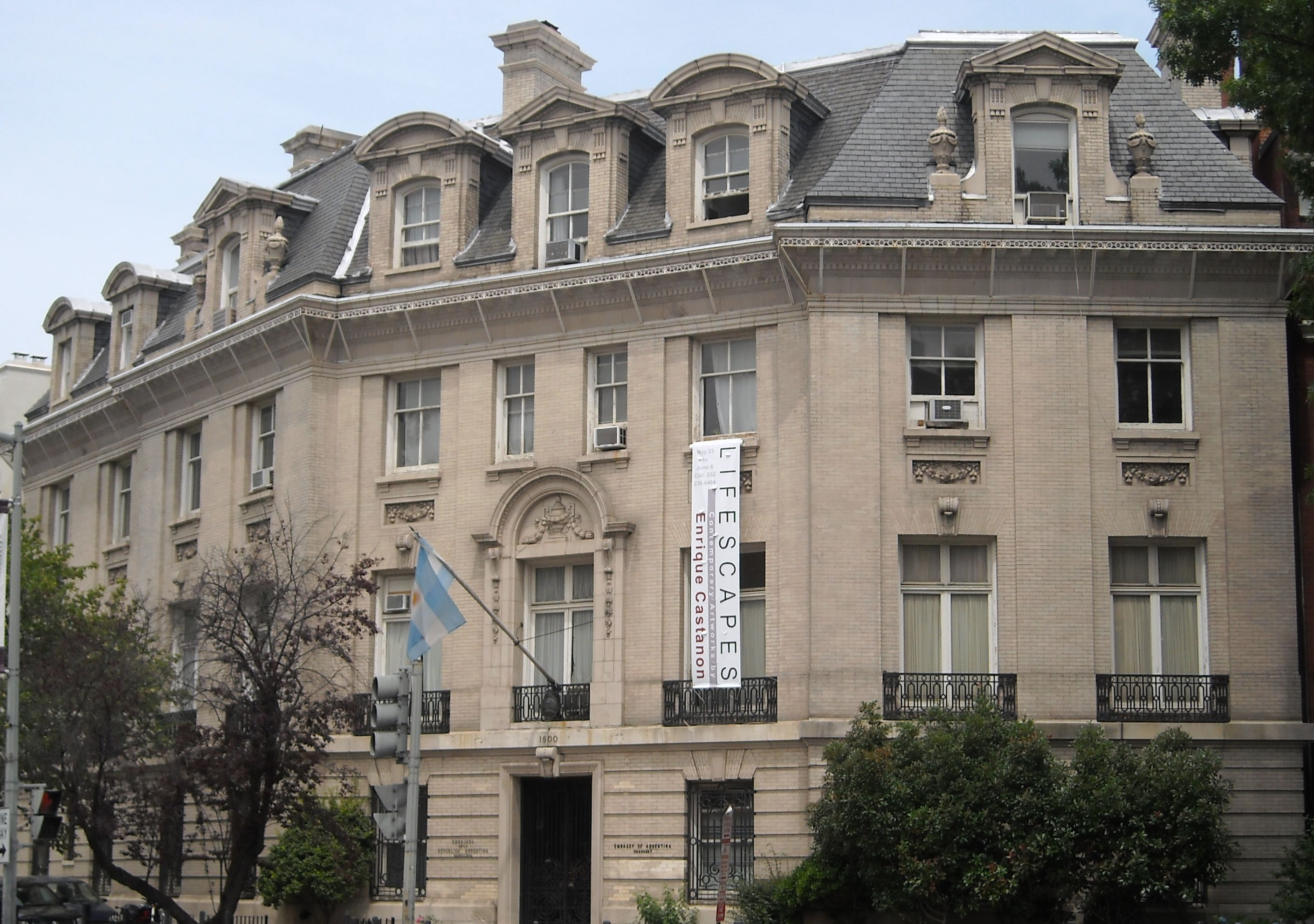
Huff's mansion, built in 1906, today serves as the Argentine Embassy

On March 16, 1871, Huff married the former Henrietta Burrell, a daughter of Jeremiah M. Burrell, President Judge of the Tenth Judicial District of Pennsylvania. They were the parents of eight children.

Along with sixty-odd wealthy Western Pennsylvanians including Andrew Carnegie, Andrew Mellon and Henry Clay Frick, Huff was a member of the elite South Fork Fishing and Hunting Club whose earthen dam at Lake Conemaugh failed on May 31, 1889, causing the Johnstown Flood.

He died in Washington, D.C., in 1912, aged 69. He was interred in St. Clair Cemetery in Greensburg, Pennsylvania.

Huff's Dupont Circle mansion, designed by Horace Trumbauer and Julian Abele and built in 1906, was sold by his widow in 1913 to the Argentine Ministry of Foreign Relations, and has since housed the Embassy of Argentina.

== See also ==
- Richard Coulter, business partner

== Sources ==
- United States Congress. "George H. Huff (id: H000911)". Biographical Directory of the United States Congress.
- The Political Graveyard

U.S. House of Representatives
Preceded by Samuel Alfred Craig	Member of the U.S. House of Representatives from Pennsylvania's 21st congressional district 1891–1893	Succeeded by Daniel B. Heiner
Preceded by At-large: Galusha A. Grow; Alexander McDowell	Member of the U.S. House of Representatives from Pennsylvania's at-large congressional district 1895–1897 alongside: Galusha A. Grow	Succeeded by At-large: Galusha A. Grow; Samuel A. Davenport
Preceded by John Dalzell	Member of the U.S. House of Representatives from Pennsylvania's 22nd congressional district 1903–1911	Succeeded by Curtis H. Gregg
