= William Henry Miller (American politician) =

American politician

William Henry Miller (February 28, 1829 – September 12, 1870) was a Democratic member of the U.S. House of Representatives from Pennsylvania.

Miller, the son of Jesse Miller, was born in Landisburg, Pennsylvania. He attended the public schools in Landisburg and a private school in Harrisburg, Pennsylvania. He graduated from Franklin & Marshall College in Lancaster, Pennsylvania, in 1846. He studied law, was admitted to the bar the same year and practiced in Harrisburg and later in New Bloomfield, Pennsylvania, in 1849. He returned to Harrisburg in 1854 and became clerk of the Supreme Court of Pennsylvania from 1854 to 1863. He was clerk of the Pennsylvania State Senate in 1858 and 1859.

Miller was elected as a Democrat to the Thirty-eighth Congress, defeating the incumbent Republican Speaker of the House, Galusha Grow. He was an unsuccessful candidate for reelection in 1864. He was a delegate to the 1864 Democratic National Convention. He resumed the practice of law and also engaged in journalism. He died in Harrisburg in 1870. Interment in Harrisburg Cemetery.

== Sources ==
- United States Congress. "William Henry Miller (id: M000763)". Biographical Directory of the United States Congress.
- The Political Graveyard

U.S. House of Representatives
Preceded by Galusha A. Grow	Member of the U.S. House of Representatives from Pennsylvania's 14th congressional district 1863–1865	Succeeded by George F. Miller
