= George Funston Miller =

American politician

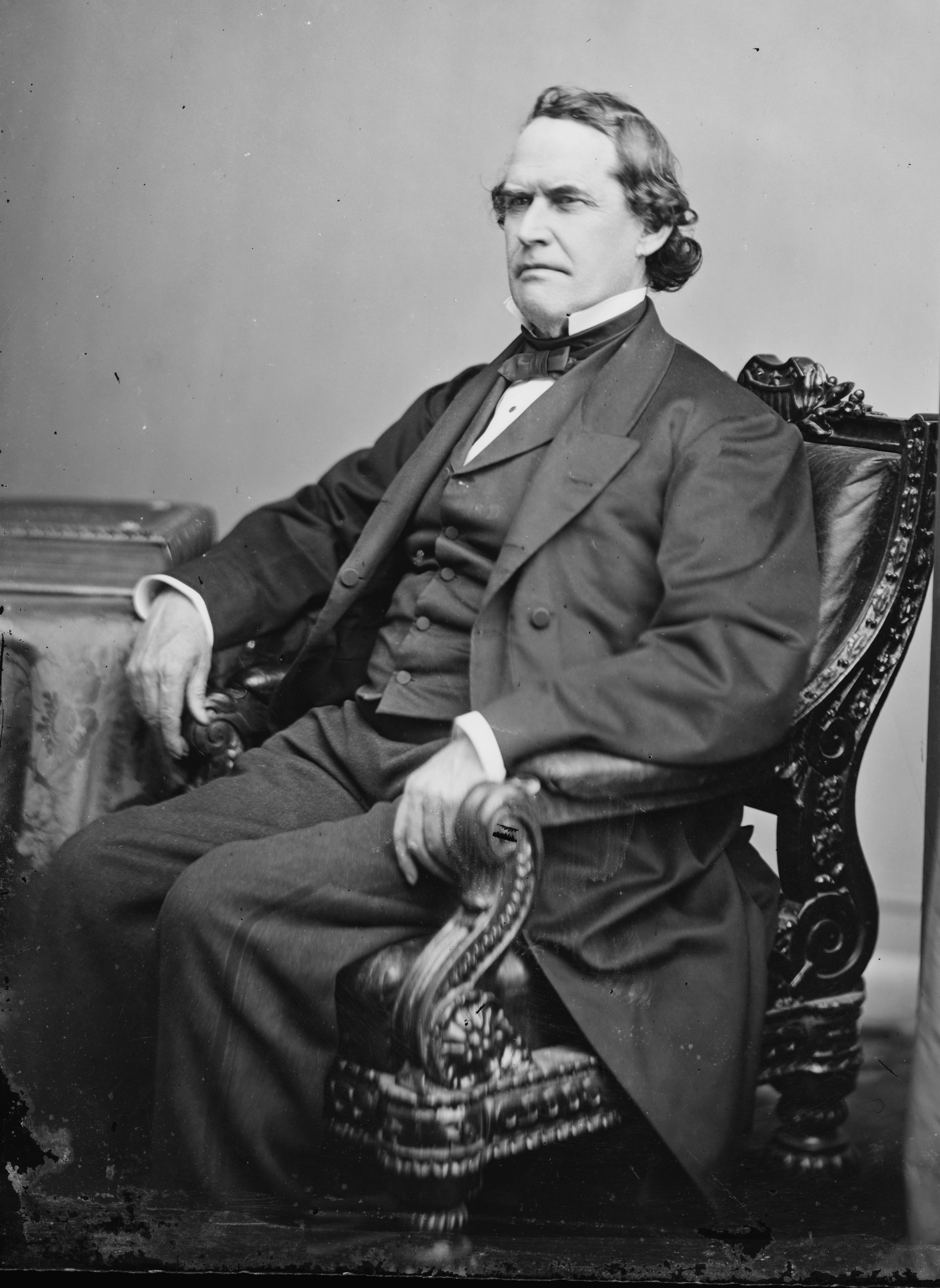
George Funston Miller

George Funston Miller (September 5, 1809 – October 21, 1885) was a Republican member of the U.S. House of Representatives from Pennsylvania.

== Formative years ==
George F. Miller was born in Chillisquaque Township, Pennsylvania on September 5, 1809. He attended Kirkpatrick's Academy in Milton, Pennsylvania. While employed as a teacher in his local common school, he studied law.

Admitted to the bar of Union County, Pennsylvania on May 15, 1833, he subsequently opened a law practice in Lewisburg, Pennsylvania.

== Academic and public service career ==
A member of the board of curators of the University at Lewisburg (now Bucknell University) from 1846 to 1882, Miller served as scribe of curators from 1847 to 1851 and secretary of the board of trustees of Bucknell University from 1848 to 1864.

He was elected as a Republican to the Thirty-ninth and Fortieth Congresses.

Following his legislative career, he resumed the practice of law, and served as president of the Lewisburg, Centre & Spruce Creek Railroad.

== Death and interment ==
Miller died in Lewisburg on October 21, 1885, and was interred in the Lewisburg Cemetery.

== Sources ==
- United States Congress. "George Funston Miller (id: M000726)". Biographical Directory of the United States Congress.
- The Political Graveyard

U.S. House of Representatives
Preceded by William H. Miller	Member of the U.S. House of Representatives from Pennsylvania's 14th congressional district 1865–1869	Succeeded by John B. Packer
