= Charles Emory Patton =

American politician

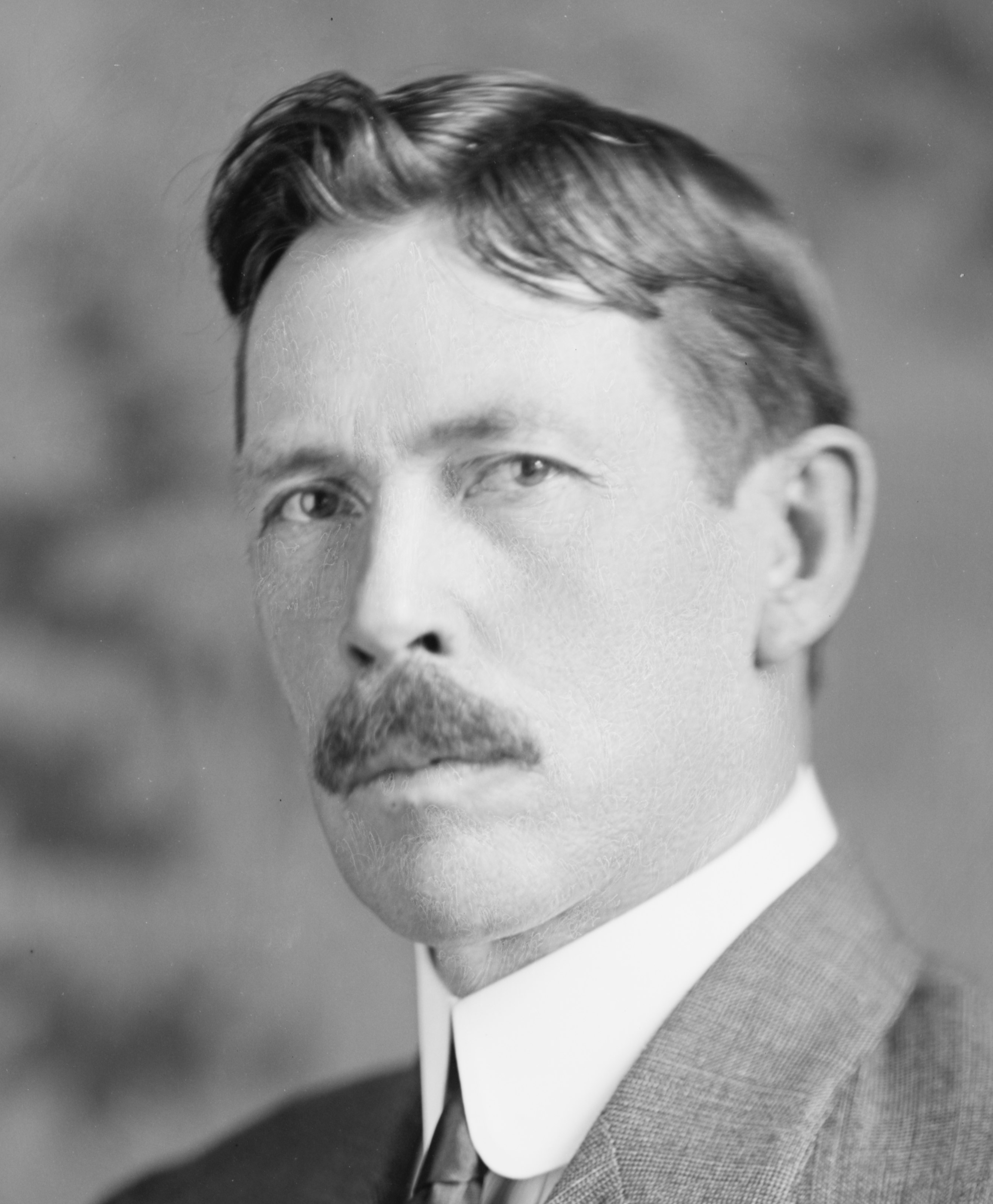

Member of the U.S. House of Representatives from Pennsylvania's 21st district
- In office March 4, 1911 – March 3, 1915
- Preceded by: Charles F. Barclay
- Succeeded by: Charles H. Rowland

Personal details
- Born: July 5, 1859 Curwensville, Pennsylvania
- Died: December 15, 1937 (aged 78) West Grove, Pennsylvania
- Party: Republican
- Parent: John Patton (father)
- Relatives: John Patton Jr.

Charles Emory Patton (July 5, 1859 – December 15, 1937) was a U.S. representative from the state of Pennsylvania. He was the son of John Patton and the brother of John Patton, Jr.

== Biography ==
Patton was born in Curwensville, Pennsylvania and attended the common schools. He graduated from Lycoming College in Williamsport, Pennsylvania in 1878 and engaged in the lumber business.

He owned and operated the Curwensville Electric Co., and then engaged in the construction contracting business. He was director of the Curwensville National Bank, a member of the school board, serving as president, and a member of the city council, and served as burgess.

He was elected as a Republican to the Sixty-second and Sixty-third Congresses, serving from March 4, 1911, to March 3, 1915. He was not a candidate for renomination in 1914. He was appointed secretary of agriculture for the State of Pennsylvania October 15, 1915, and served in this capacity until January 22, 1920.

He retired to a farm near West Grove, Pennsylvania and resumed his agricultural work.

== Death and interment ==
Patton died on his estate, at the age of seventy-eight, and was interred in Oak Hill Cemetery in Curwensville.

U.S. House of Representatives
Preceded by Charles F. Barclay	Member of the U.S. House of Representatives from Pennsylvania's 21st congressional district 1911–1915	Succeeded by Charles H. Rowland
