= Welty McCullogh =

American politician

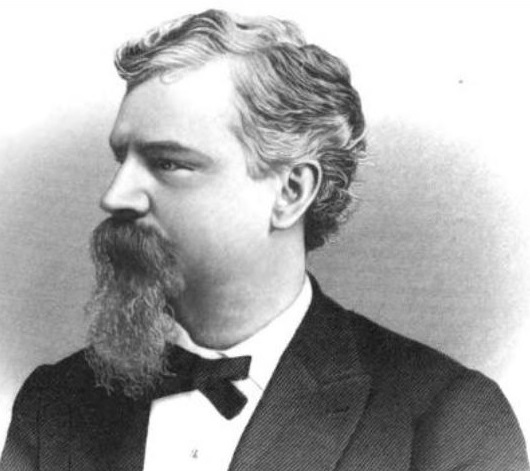
McCullough in History of Westmoreland County, Pennsylvania, published in 1906

Welty McCullogh (October 10, 1847 – August 31, 1889) was a Republican member of the U.S. House of Representatives from Pennsylvania.

== Biography ==
McCullogh was born in Greensburg, Pennsylvania. He attended the common schools and Washington and Jefferson College in Washington, Pennsylvania. He served as second clerk under Captain W. B. Coulter, provost marshal of twenty-first district of Pennsylvania, during the American Civil War. He graduated from Princeton College in June 1870. He studied law, was admitted to the bar in 1872 and commenced practice in Greensburg. He served as assistant solicitor for the Baltimore and Ohio Railroad.

McCullogh was elected as a Republican to the Fiftieth Congress. He was an unsuccessful candidate for renomination in 1888. He continued the practice of law until his death in Greensburg in 1889. Interment in the new St. Clair Cemetery.

U.S. House of Representatives
Preceded by Charles E. Boyle	Member of the U.S. House of Representatives from Pennsylvania's 21st congressional district 1887-1889	Succeeded by Samuel A. Craig
