= Jacob Turney =

American politician

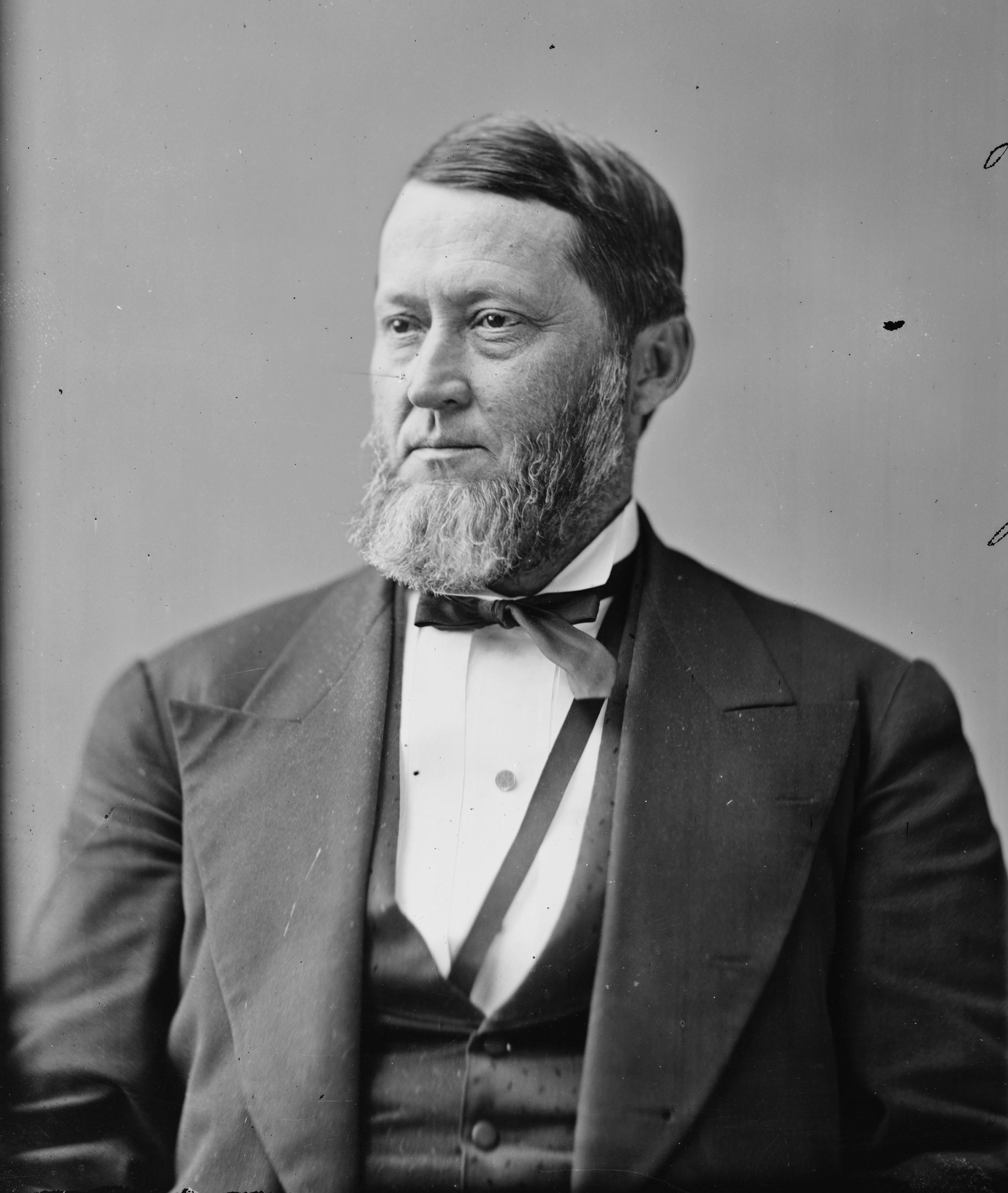

Member of the U.S. House of Representatives from Pennsylvania's 21st district
- In office March 4, 1875 – March 3, 1879
- Preceded by: Alexander W. Taylor
- Succeeded by: Morgan R. Wise

Member of the Pennsylvania Senate for the 22nd district
- In office 1858–1860
- Preceded by: William Wilkins
- Succeeded by: Smith Fuller

Personal details
- Born: February 18, 1825 Greensburg, Pennsylvania, US
- Died: October 4, 1891 (aged 66)
- Resting place: St. Clair Cemetery
- Party: Democratic

Jacob Turney (February 18, 1825 – October 4, 1891) was an American lawyer and politician from Pennsylvania who served two terms as a Democratic member of the U.S. House of Representatives for Pennsylvania's 21st congressional district from 1875 to 1879. He also served as a member of the Pennsylvania Senate for the 22nd district from 1858 to 1860.

== Early life and education ==
Turney was born in Greensburg, Pennsylvania, to Dutch immigrants Jacob, Sr. and Margaret (Singer) Turney. He completed preparatory studies and attended Greensburg Academy. He apprenticed as a printer and worked as a deputy sheriff and clerk in the register and recorder's office. He studied law under Albert Marchand, was admitted to the bar in 1849 and commenced practice in Greensburg.

== Career ==
He served as district attorney for Westmoreland County, Pennsylvania, from 1850 to 1855. He gained prominence through the successful prosecution of several high profile murder trials. He was a presidential elector in 1856 and cast his vote for James Buchanan. He was a member of the Pennsylvania State Senate for the 22nd district from 1858 to 1860 and was elected president in 1859. He was an unsuccessful candidate for State Senator in 1871.

=== Congress ===
Turney was elected as a Democrat to the Forty-fourth and Forty-fifth Congresses. He served on the Privileges and Elections, Mines, Territories and Currencies Committees. He played a key role in the passage of the Bland-Allison Act which reintroduced the legality of silver currency.

=== Later career and death ===
After leaving Congress, he resumed the practice of law. He died in Greensburg in 1891.

== Sources ==
- United States Congress. "Jacob Turney (id: T000431)". Biographical Directory of the United States Congress.
- The Political Graveyard

Pennsylvania State Senate
Preceded by William Wilkins	Member of the Pennsylvania Senate, 22nd district 1858-1860	Succeeded by Smith Fuller
U.S. House of Representatives
Preceded by Alexander W. Taylor	Member of the U.S. House of Representatives from Pennsylvania's 21st congressional district 1875 - 1879	Succeeded by Morgan R. Wise
