= Charles Frederick Barclay =

American politician (1844–1914)

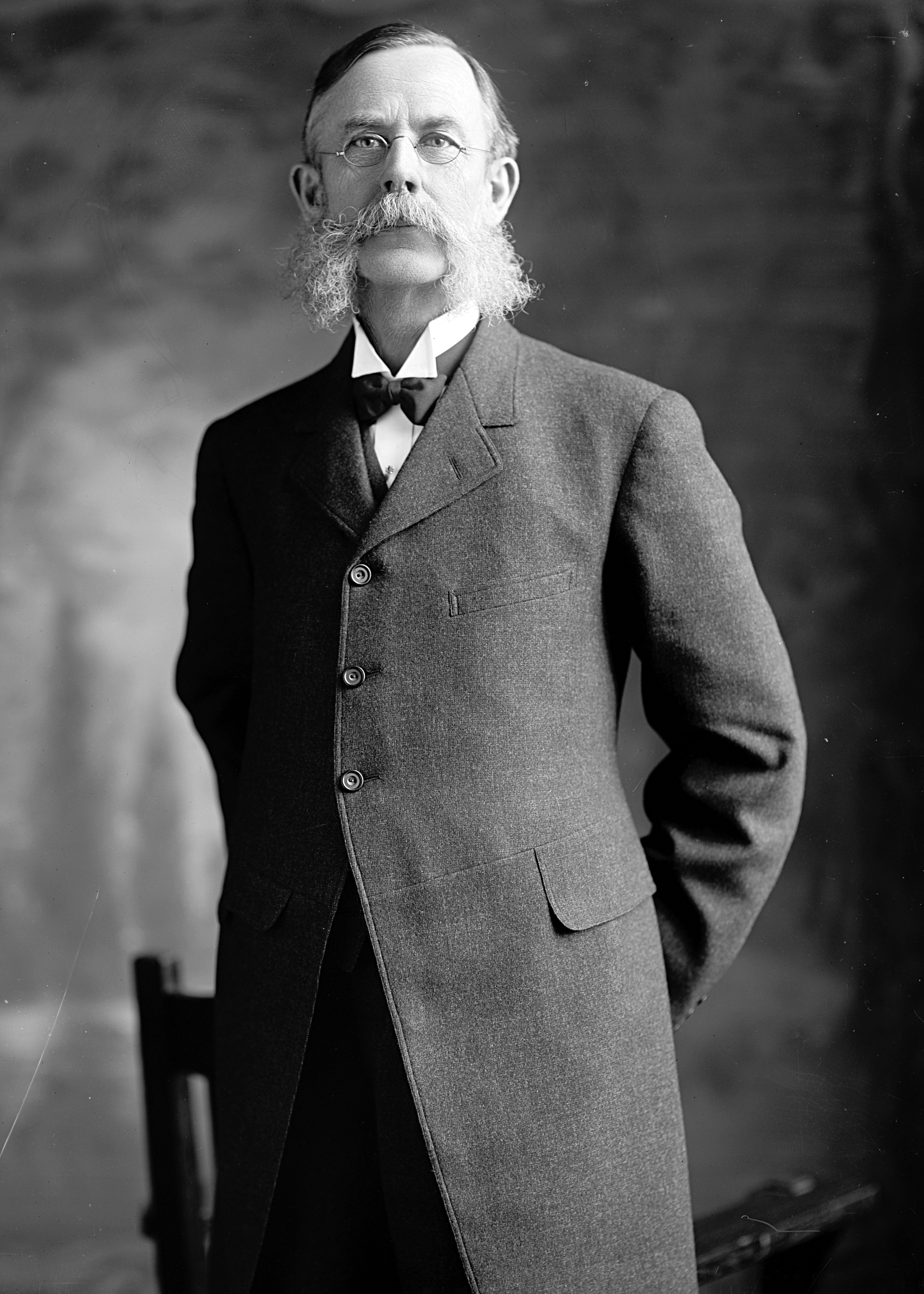

Member of the U.S. House of Representatives from Pennsylvania's 21st district
- In office March 4, 1907 – March 3, 1911
- Preceded by: Solomon Robert Dresser
- Succeeded by: Charles Emory Patton

Personal details
- Born: May 9, 1844 Owego, New York
- Died: March 9, 1914 (aged 69)
- Party: Republican
- Education: University of Michigan

Charles Frederick Barclay (May 9, 1844 – March 9, 1914) was a Republican U.S. Representative from the state of Pennsylvania.

Charles F. Barclay was born in Owego, New York. He moved with his parents to Pennsylvania in 1845. He attended the Painted Post High School and Coudersport Academy. He taught school for several years. During the Civil War, he enlisted as a private in Company K, One-Hundred and Forty-ninth Regiment, Pennsylvania Volunteer Infantry, in 1862 and served until 1865, when he was mustered out with the rank of captain. He attended Belfast Seminary, New York, and subsequently studied law at the University of Michigan at Ann Arbor, Michigan, but never practiced. With an elder brother, he was engaged extensively in the lumber business in Sinnamahoning, Pennsylvania. He was a delegate to the 1900 Republican National Convention at Philadelphia.

Barclay was elected as a Republican to the Sixtieth and Sixty-first Congresses. He was not a candidate for renomination in 1910. He engaged in business in Washington, D.C., until his death in 1914. Interment in Wyside Cemetery in Sinnamahoning.

Barclay Street in Manhattan is named in his honor.

U.S. House of Representatives
Preceded by Solomon Robert Dresser	Member of the U.S. House of Representatives from Pennsylvania's 21st congressional district 1907–1911	Succeeded by Charles Emory Patton
