= Alexander McDowell =

Politician

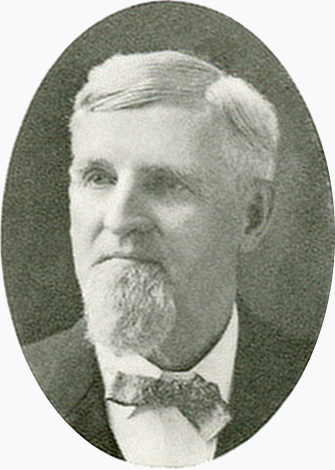

Member of the U.S. House of Representatives from Pennsylvania's at-large district
- In office March 4, 1893 – March 3, 1895
- Preceded by: District established
- Succeeded by: George F. Huff

Personal details
- Born: March 4, 1845 Franklin, Pennsylvania
- Died: September 30, 1913 (aged 68) Sharon, Pennsylvania

Alexander McDowell (March 4, 1845 – September 30, 1913) was a Republican member of the U.S. House of Representatives from Pennsylvania.

== Biography ==
Alexander McDowell was born in Franklin, Pennsylvania. He attended the common schools and learned the printing trade. He studied law but never practiced.

During the American Civil War, he served in the Union Army in the One Hundred and Twenty-first Regiment of Pennsylvania Volunteers. He was mustered out at the close of the war as brevet major.

He served as editor and publisher of the Venango Citizen until 1870, when he moved to Sharon and engaged in banking. He served as treasurer and director of the School Board of Sharon from 1880 to 1913, and as treasurer of the borough of Sharon from 1880 to 1909.

McDowell was elected as a Republican to the Fifty-third Congress. He was not a candidate for renomination in 1894. He was elected Clerk of the House of Representatives on March 4, 1895, and served in that capacity until March 3, 1911. He was a delegate to the Republican National Conventions in 1900, 1904, and 1908.

He resumed banking interests, and died in Sharon, Pennsylvania on September 30, 1913. He was interred in the Oakwood Cemetery in Sharon.

U.S. House of Representatives
Preceded by At-large: None	Member of the U.S. House of Representatives from Pennsylvania's at-large congressional district 1893–1895 alongside: William Lilly (1893) and Galusha A. Grow (1894-1895)	Succeeded by At-large: Galusha A. Grow; George F. Huff
Government offices
Preceded by James Kerr	Clerk of the United States House of Representatives; March 4, 1895 – March 3, 1911	Succeeded by South Trimble
