= Solomon R. Dresser =

American politician

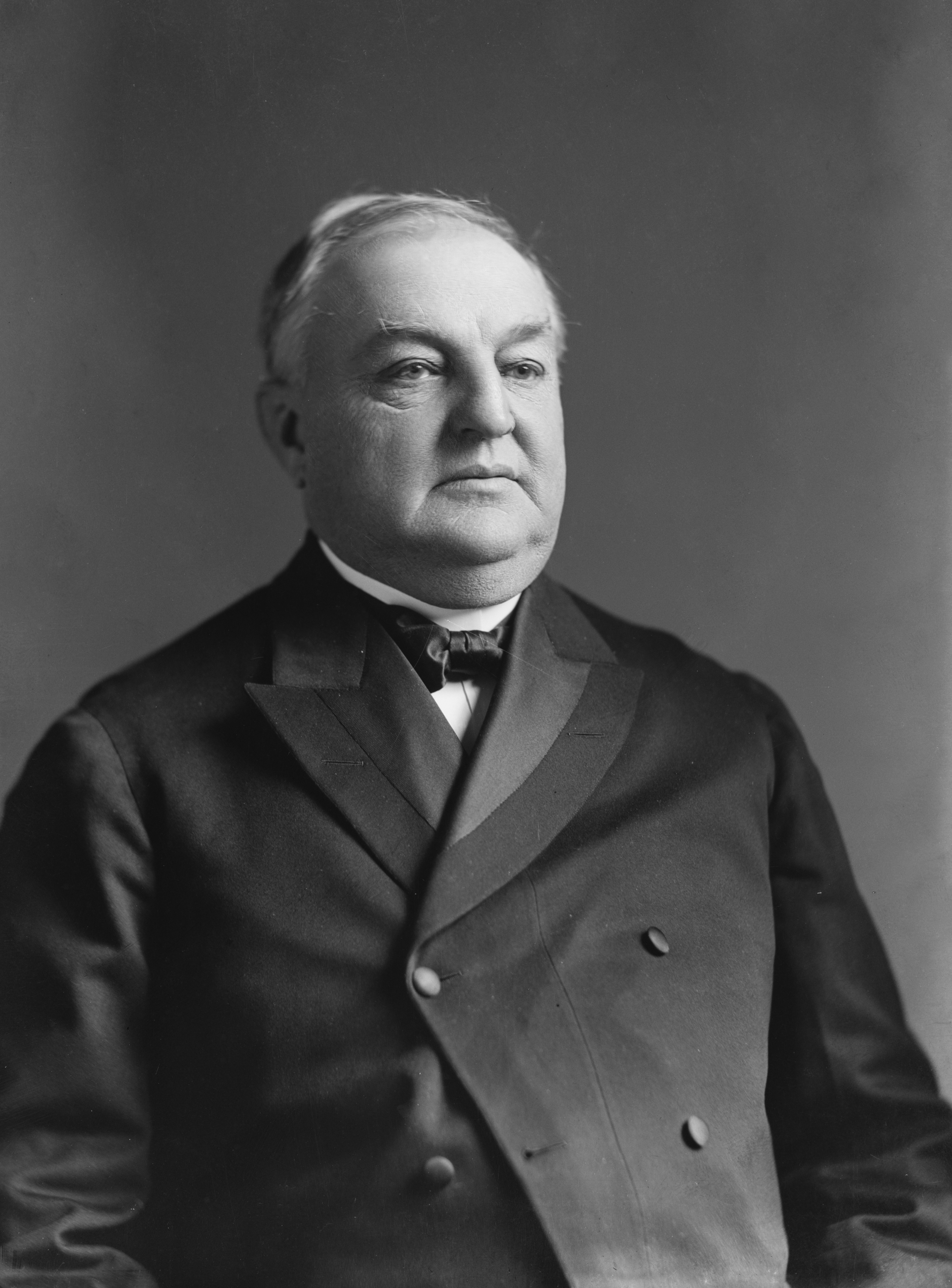

Member of the U.S. House of Representatives from Pennsylvania's 21st district
- In office March 4, 1903 – March 3, 1907
- Preceded by: Summers Melville Jack
- Succeeded by: Charles Frederick Barclay

Personal details
- Born: February 1, 1842 Litchfield, Michigan
- Died: January 21, 1911 (aged 68) Bradford, Pennsylvania
- Party: Republican

Solomon Robert Dresser (February 1, 1842 – January 21, 1911) was an inventor and a Republican member of the U.S. House of Representatives from Pennsylvania.

== Biography ==
Solomon R. Dresser was born in Litchfield, Michigan. He attended the common schools and Hillsdale College. He engaged in agricultural pursuits until 1865. He became an inventor of oil and gas well equipment, and moved to Pennsylvania in 1872, when the Pennsylvania oil rush was nearing its end, to work in the production of oil and gas.

The problem he first tackled was preventing dirty surface groundwater from contaminating oil pumped from wells, which was accomplished by so-called "packers" sealing the gap between the well and the tube for pumping the oil. By the late 1870s, he developed a new type of packer utilizing a tube-like rubber seal squeezed during operation, and in 1880 patented his invention and founded S.R. Dresser Manufacturing Co. to commercialize it.

Later in the 1880s, he started developing pipeline connectors, and after several patents in 1886-1889 arrived to a leakproof flexible design featuring, just like his packer, a squeezable tube-like rubber seal. This Dresser joint or Dresser coupling for the first time enabled long-range transmission of natural gas, displaced all the other alternatives on the market and became a de facto standard in the industry by late 1890s, continuing at least into 1920s. Dresser type couplings are still manufactured and used today for various plumbing, infrastructure, and insutrial applications.

In 1903, he left business and engineering in favor of politics. Dresser was elected as a Republican to the Fifty-eighth and Fifty-ninth Congresses. He was not a candidate for renomination in 1906. He resumed former business pursuits and died in Bradford, Pennsylvania in 1911; he was originally interred in Oak Hill Cemetery, but his son (unhappy with the maintenance of the cemetery) had the 20 foot obelisk and the families graves moved to Willowdale Cemetery.

== Sources ==
- United States Congress. "Solomon R. Dresser (id: D000493)". Biographical Directory of the United States Congress.
- The Political Graveyard

U.S. House of Representatives
Preceded by Summers M. Jack	Member of the U.S. House of Representatives from Pennsylvania's 21st congressional district 1903–1907	Succeeded by Charles F. Barclay
