= Edward E. Robbins =

American politician

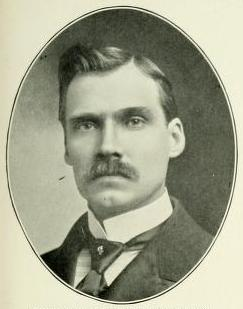
- Portrait, 1901

Member of the U.S. House of Representatives from Pennsylvania
- In office March 4, 1917 – January 25, 1919
- Preceded by: Abraham L. Keister
- Succeeded by: John H. Wilson
- Constituency: 22nd district
- In office March 4, 1897 – March 3, 1899
- Preceded by: Daniel B. Heiner
- Succeeded by: Summers M. Jack
- Constituency: 21st district

Member of the Pennsylvania State Senate from the 39th district
- In office December 1, 1888 – December 1, 1892
- Preceded by: George F. Huff
- Succeeded by: John H. Brown

Personal details
- Born: Edward Everett Robbins; September 27, 1860 Robbins Station, Pennsylvania, U.S.
- Died: January 25, 1919 (aged 58) Somerset, Pennsylvania, U.S.
- Party: Republican
- Spouse: Luella Stauffer Moore (m. 1896)

Military service
- Branch: Pennsylvania National Guard
- Rank: Major
- Battles/wars: Spanish–American War

Edward Everett Robbins (September 27, 1860 – January 25, 1919) was a Republican member of the U.S. House of Representatives from Pennsylvania.

Edward E. Robbins was born at Robbins Station, Westmoreland County, Pennsylvania, son of Joseph Robbins, a coal mine operator. He attended the Elder's Ridge Academy and the Indiana Normal School. He graduated from Washington and Jefferson College in Washington, Pennsylvania, in 1881 and from the law department of Columbia College in New York City, in 1884. He was admitted to the bar in 1884 and commenced practice in Greensburg, Pennsylvania. He was also engaged in banking and coal-mining enterprises. He was a member of the Pennsylvania State Senate from 1888 to 1892. He served as chairman of the Republican county committee in 1885. He was a member of the Pennsylvania National Guard, and served as major of Volunteers in the Spanish–American War in 1898.

Robbins was elected as a Republican to the Fifty-fifth Congress. He was not a candidate for renomination in 1898. He resumed the practice of his profession in Greensburg. He was elected to the Sixty-fifth Congress and served until his death. He had been reelected to the Sixty-sixth Congress, but died in Somerset, Pennsylvania, before taking his seat. Interment in Saint Clair Cemetery in Greensburg.

== See also ==
- List of members of the United States Congress who died in office (1900–1949)

U.S. House of Representatives
Preceded by Daniel B. Heiner	Member of the U.S. House of Representatives from Pennsylvania's 21st congressional district 1897–1899	Succeeded by Summers M. Jack
Preceded by Abraham L. Keister	Member of the U.S. House of Representatives from Pennsylvania's 22nd congressional district 1917–1919	Succeeded by John Haden Wilson
