= Morgan R. Wise =

Member of the 46th and 47th Congress of the United States

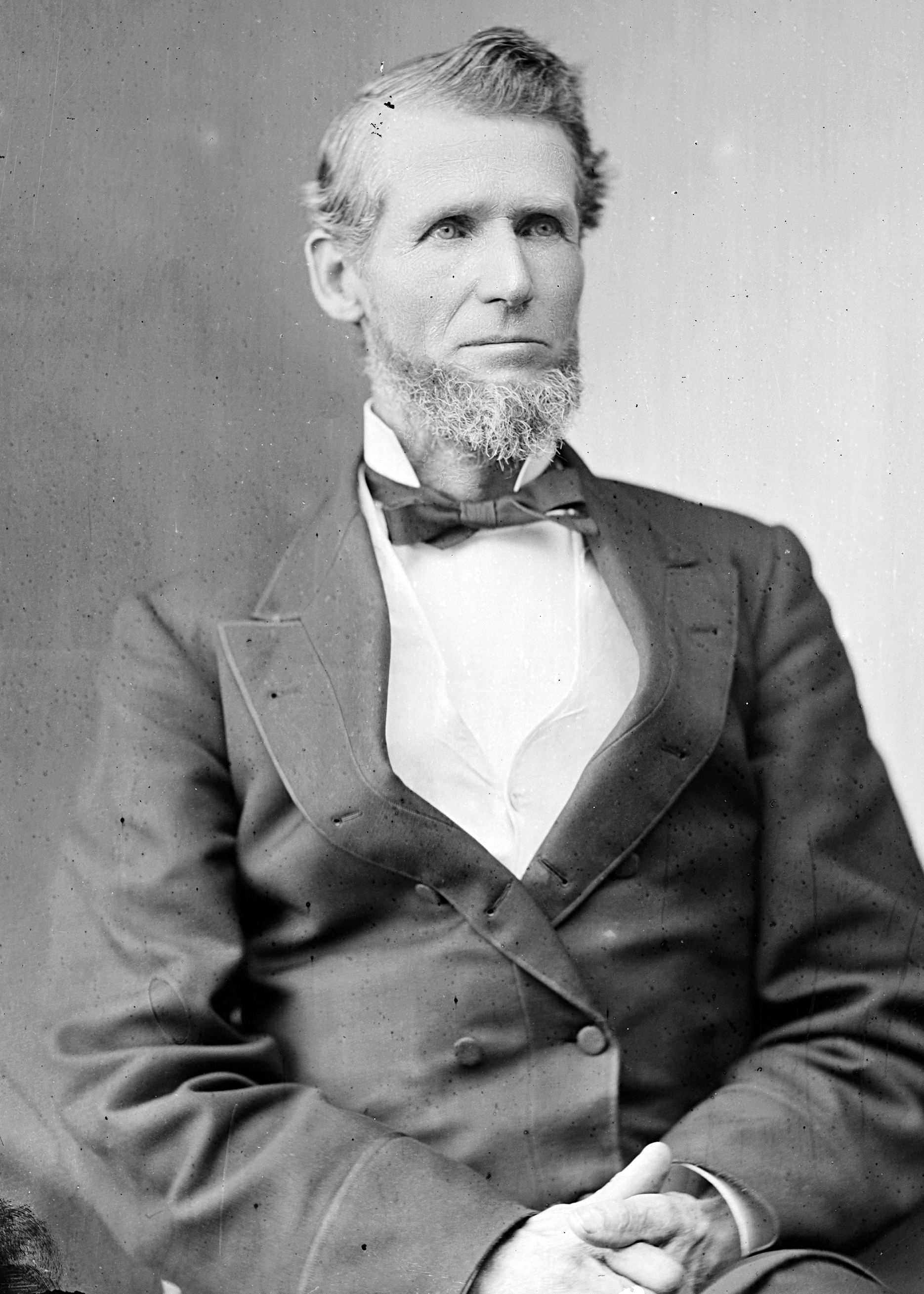
Morgan Ringland Wise

Morgan Ringland Wise (June 7, 1825 – April 13, 1903) was a member of the 46th and 47th Congress of the United States.

== Biography ==
Wise was born in West Bethlehem, Pennsylvania on June 7, 1825. He engaged in gold mining in California in 1850 and, while there, volunteered under Major Stammins, to defend the miners in their disagreements with Indigenous peoples. He returned to Pennsylvania where he graduated from Waynesburg College in 1856. He spent several years engaged in agricultural pursuits.

He was elected as a member of the Pennsylvania House of Representatives, serving from 1874 to 1878. Later he was elected as a Democrat to the 46th and 47th Congress. He did not seek re-election in 1882.

Wise moved to Arizona where he became a rancher and raised cattle. He was appointed as consular agent at Nogales, Mexico from February 10, 1888 to May 31, 1900. On August 6, 1896, he was witness to a failed bank robbery in Nogales, Arizona, while attending a meeting in the bank.

== Death and interment ==
Following the end of his appointment, Wise returned to the East, where he died in Coraopolis, Pennsylvania on April 13, 1903. His body was taken to Waynesburg, Pennsylvania for burial.

== See also ==
- Skeleton Canyon Shootout

== Sources ==
- United States Congress. "Morgan R. Wise (id: W000652)". Biographical Directory of the United States Congress.
- The Political Graveyard

U.S. House of Representatives
Preceded by Jacob Turney	Member of the U.S. House of Representatives from Pennsylvania's 21st congressional district 1879 - 1883	Succeeded by Charles E. Boyle
