= Charles Edmund Boyle =

American politician (1838–1888)

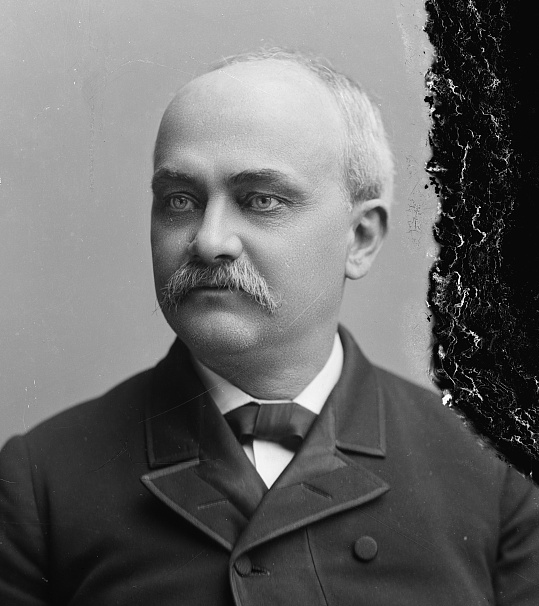
- Photographed between 1873 and 1890

Member of the U.S. House of Representatives from Pennsylvania's 21st district
- In office March 4, 1883 – March 3, 1887
- Preceded by: Morgan R. Wise
- Succeeded by: Welty McCullogh

Member of the Pennsylvania House of Representatives
- In office 1865-1866

Personal details
- Born: February 4, 1836 Uniontown, Pennsylvania
- Died: December 15, 1888 (aged 52)
- Party: Democratic

Charles Edmund Boyle (February 4, 1836 – December 15, 1888) was a Democratic member of the U.S. House of Representatives from Pennsylvania.

Born in Uniontown, Fayette County, Pennsylvania on February 4, 1836, he was educated at a common school and graduated from Waynesburg College in Waynesburg, Pennsylvania. After studying law, he was admitted to the bar in December 1861 and became a practicing lawyer. He was elected district attorney for Fayette County in 1862 and served in the role until 1865.

Boyle was a member of the Pennsylvania State House of Representatives in 1866 and 1867. He was president of the Democratic State convention from 1867 to 1874 and was elected three times as a delegate to the Democratic National Convention (1876, 1880, 1888). He was elected as a Democrat to the 48th and 49th U.S. Congresses (1883–1887) but was not eligible for renomination in 1886.

In September 1888, Boyle was appointed Chief Justice of Washington Territory; he died three months later in Seattle, Washington. He is buried in Oak Grove Cemetery in Uniontown, Pennsylvania.

== Sources ==
- The Political Graveyard

U.S. House of Representatives
Preceded by Morgan R. Wise	Member of the U.S. House of Representatives from Pennsylvania's 21st congressional district 1883 - 1887	Succeeded by Welty McCullogh
