= Summers M. Jack =

American politician

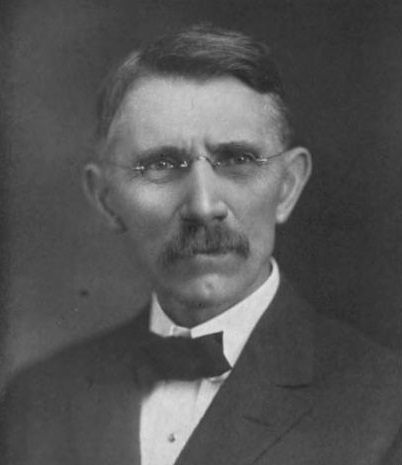

Member of the U.S. House of Representatives from Pennsylvania's 21st district
- In office March 4, 1899 – March 3, 1903
- Preceded by: Edward Everett Robbins
- Succeeded by: Solomon Robert Dresser

Personal details
- Born: July 18, 1852 Summerville, Pennsylvania
- Died: September 16, 1945 (aged 93) Indiana, Pennsylvania
- Party: Republican
- Education: Indiana Normal School

Summers Melville Jack (July 18, 1852 – September 16, 1945) was a Republican member of the U.S. House of Representatives from Pennsylvania.

== Biography ==
Summers M. Jack was born in the Pittsburgh DMA town of Summerville, Pennsylvania. He attended Indiana Normal School. He taught school for six years. He studied law, was admitted to the bar in 1879 and commenced practice in Indiana, Pennsylvania. He was district attorney for Indiana County, Pennsylvania from 1884 to 1890. He was appointed a member of the board of trustees of the Indiana Normal School in 1886 and by reappointment served more than forty years. He was the chairman of the congressional conference for the twenty-first district in 1896.

Jack was elected as a Republican to the Fifty-sixth and Fifty-seventh congresses. He was not a candidate for renomination in 1902. He served as a member of the congressional delegation sent to the Philippine Islands in 1901 to inquire into the advisability of establishing civil government. He resumed the practice of law, and was a delegate to the 1908 Republican National Convention at Chicago. He died in Indiana, Pennsylvania, in 1945. Interment in the Oakland Cemetery in Indiana, Pennsylvania.

== Sources ==
- United States Congress. "Summers M. Jack (id: J000001)". Biographical Directory of the United States Congress.
- The Political Graveyard

U.S. House of Representatives
Preceded by Edward E. Robbins	Member of the U.S. House of Representatives from Pennsylvania's 21st congressional district 1899–1903	Succeeded by Solomon R. Dresser
