= Samuel Alfred Craig =

American politician

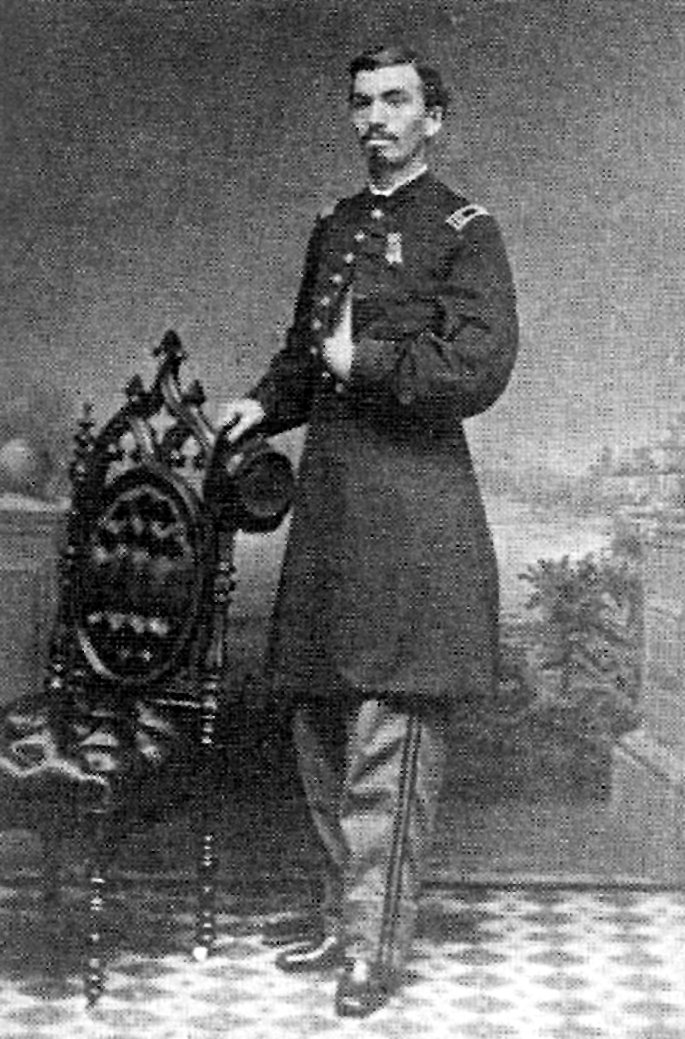

Member of the U.S. House of Representatives from Pennsylvania's 21st district
- In office March 4, 1889 – March 3, 1891
- Preceded by: Welty McCullogh
- Succeeded by: George F. Huff

Personal details
- Born: November 19, 1839 Brookville, Pennsylvania
- Died: March 17, 1920 (aged 80) Brookville, Pennsylvania
- Party: Republican

Military service
- Allegiance: United States of America
- Branch/service: Union Army
- Rank: Captain
- Battles/wars: American Civil War

Samuel Alfred Craig (November 19, 1839 – March 17, 1920) was a Civil War soldier, attorney, and a Republican member of the U.S. House of Representatives from Pennsylvania.

== Biography ==
Craig was born in Brookville, Pennsylvania. He attended the common schools of his native town and Jefferson College in Canonsburg, Pennsylvania. He learned the printer's trade and taught school.

He enlisted in the Union Army as a private on April 19, 1861. He was promoted successively to second lieutenant, first lieutenant, and captain of Company B, 105th Regiment, Pennsylvania Volunteer Infantry. He was commissioned captain in the Veteran Reserve Corps, United States Army, and served continuously for four years and three months.

Following the war, Craig studied law, was admitted to the bar in 1876 and commenced practice in Brookville. He was elected district attorney of Jefferson County, Pennsylvania, in 1878.

Craig was elected as a Republican to the Fifty-first Congress. He was an unsuccessful candidate for renomination in 1890.

He resumed the practice of law in Brookville, where he died in 1920, aged 80. He was interred in Brookville Cemetery.

U.S. House of Representatives
| Preceded by Welty McCullogh | Member of the U.S. House of Representatives from Pennsylvania's 21st congressional district 1889-1891 | Succeeded by George F. Huff |
