= List of United States senators in the 53rd Congress =

This is a complete list of United States senators during the 53rd United States Congress listed by seniority from March 4, 1893, to March 3, 1895.

Order of service is based on the commencement of the senator's first term. Behind this is former service as a senator (only giving the senator seniority within their new incoming class), service as vice president, a House member, a cabinet secretary, or a governor of a state. The final factor is the population of the senator's state.

Senators who were sworn in during the middle of the Congress (up until the last senator who was not sworn in early after winning the November 1894 election) are listed at the end of the list with no number.

== Terms of service ==
Class	Terms of service of senators that expired in years
Class 2	Terms of service of senators that expired in 1895 (AL, AR, CO, DE, GA, IA, ID, IL, KS, KY, LA, MA, ME, MI, MN, MS, MT, NC, NE, NH, NJ, OR, RI, SC, SD, TN, TX, VA, WV, and WY.)
Class 3	Terms of service of senators that expired in 1897 (AL, AR, CA, CO, CT, FL, GA, IA, ID, IL, IN, KS, KY, LA, MD, MO, NC, ND, NH, NV, NY, OH, OR, PA, SC, SD, VT, WA, and WI.)
Class 1	Terms of service of senators that expired in 1899 (CA, CT, DE, FL, IN, MA, MD, ME, MI, MN, MO, MS, MT, ND, NE, NJ, NV, NY, OH, PA, RI, TN, TX, VA, VT, WA, WI, WV, and WY.)

== U.S. Senate seniority list ==
U.S. Senate seniority
Rank	Senator (party-state)	Seniority date	Other factors
1	Justin S. Morrill (R-VT)	March 4, 1867	
2	Matt W. Ransom (D-NC) (Note: Retired or defeated after 1894 election.)	January 30, 1872	
3	William B. Allison (R-IA)	March 4, 1873	Former representative
4	John P. Jones (R-NV)	March 4, 1873	
5	Francis Cockrell (D-MO)	March 4, 1875	
6	George F. Hoar (R-MA)	March 4, 1877	Former representative
7	Isham G. Harris (D-TN)	March 4, 1877	Former governor
8	John T. Morgan (D-AL)	March 4, 1877	
9	John R. McPherson (D-NJ)	March 4, 1877	
10	Matthew Butler (D-SC)	March 4, 1877	
11	Richard Coke (D-TX)	March 4, 1877	
12	J. Donald Cameron (R-PA)	March 20, 1877	
13	Daniel W. Voorhees (D-IN)	November 6, 1877	
14	George G. Vest (D-MO)	March 4, 1879	Missouri 5th in population (1870)
15	Orville H. Platt (R-CT)	March 4, 1879	Connecticut 25th in population (1870)
16	Wilkinson Call (D-FL)	March 4, 1879	Florida 33rd in population (1870)
17	Zebulon Vance (D-NC) (Note: Zebulon Vance died April 14, 1894.)	March 4, 1879	
18	James L. Pugh (D-AL)	November 24, 1880	
19	John Sherman (R-OH)	March 4, 1881	Previously a senator
20	Eugene Hale (R-ME)	March 4, 1881	Former representative (10 years)
21	Joseph R. Hawley (R-CT)	March 4, 1881	Former representative (5 years)
22	James Z. George (D-MS)	March 4, 1881	Mississippi 18th in population (1870)
23	Arthur P. Gorman (D-MD)	March 4, 1881	Maryland 20th in population (1870)
24	William P. Frye (R-ME)	March 18, 1881	
25	Nelson W. Aldrich (R-RI)	October 5, 1881	
26	Alfred H. Colquitt (D-GA)	March 4, 1883	
27	Shelby M. Cullom (R-IL)	March 4, 1883	Former governor
28	James F. Wilson (R-IA)	March 4, 1883	
29	Charles F. Manderson (R-NE)	March 4, 1883	
30	Joseph N. Dolph (R-OR)	March 4, 1883	
31	Henry M. Teller (R-CO)	March 4, 1885	Former senator
32	J. C. S. Blackburn (D-KY)	March 4, 1885	Former representative
33	James K. Jones (D-AR)	March 4, 1885	
34	Leland Stanford (R-CA) (Note: Leland Stanford died June 21, 1893.)	March 4, 1885	Former governor
35	Edward C. Walthall (D-MS) (Note: Edward Walthall resigned January 24, 1894.)	March 9, 1885	
36	George Gray (D-DE)	March 18, 1885	
37	James H. Berry (D-AR)	March 20, 1885	
38	John H. Mitchell (R-OR)	November 18, 1885	Previously a senator
39	William M. Stewart (R-NV)	March 4, 1887	Previously a senator (11 years)
40	David Turpie (D-IN)	March 4, 1887	Previously a senator (1 month)
41	John W. Daniel (D-VA)	March 4, 1887	Former representative
42	Francis B. Stockbridge (R-MI) (Note: Francis Stockbridge died April 30, 1894.)	March 4, 1887	
43	William B. Bate (D-TN)	March 4, 1887	Former governor, Tennessee 12th in population (1880)
44	Cushman K. Davis (R-MN)	March 4, 1887	Former governor, Minnesota 26th in population (1880)
45	Matthew Quay (R-PA)	March 4, 1887	Pennsylvania 2nd in population (1880)
46	Charles J. Faulkner (D-WV)	March 4, 1887	West Virginia 29th in population (1880)
47	Samuel Pasco (D-FL)	May 19, 1887	
48	James McMillan (R-MI)	March 4, 1889	
49	Edward O. Wolcott (R-CO)	March 4, 1889	
50	Anthony Higgins (R-DE)	March 4, 1889	
51	William D. Washburn (R-MN)	March 4, 1889	
52	Nathan F. Dixon III (R-RI)	April 10, 1889	
53	William E. Chandler (R-NH)	June 18, 1889	
54	Richard F. Pettigrew (SR-SD)	November 2, 1889	
55	Watson C. Squire (R-WA)	November 20, 1889	
56	Thomas C. Power (R-MT)	January 2, 1890	
57	Joseph M. Carey (R-WY)	November 15, 1890	Former delegate
58	George L. Shoup (R-ID)	December 18, 1890	
59	John B. Gordon (D-GA)	March 4, 1891	Previously a senator
60	Jacob H. Gallinger (R-NH)	March 4, 1891	Former representative (4 years)
61	Henry C. Hansbrough (R-ND)	March 4, 1891	Former representative (2 years)
62	Fred Dubois (R-ID)	March 4, 1891	Former delegate
63	William F. Vilas (D-WI)	March 4, 1891	Former cabinet member
64	John M. Palmer (D-IL)	March 4, 1891	Former governor
65	Calvin S. Brice (D-OH)	March 4, 1891	Ohio 3rd in population (1880)
66	William A. Peffer (PP-KS)	March 4, 1891	Kansas 20th in population (1880)
67	John L. M. Irby (D-SC)	March 4, 1891	South Carolina 21st in population (1880)
68	James H. Kyle (R-SD)	March 4, 1891	South Dakota 37th in population (1880)
69	Edward D. White (D-LA) (Note: Edward D. White resigned March 12, 1894.)	March 4, 1891	
70	Redfield Proctor (R-VT)	November 2, 1891	
71	Charles H. Gibson (D-MD)	November 19, 1891	
72	David B. Hill (D-NY)	January 7, 1892	
73	Roger Q. Mills (D-TX)	March 23, 1892	Former representative
74	Eppa Hunton (D-VA)	May 28, 1892	
75	Donelson Caffery (D-LA)	December 31, 1892	
76	Johnson N. Camden (D-WV)	January 25, 1893	Former senator
77	William Lindsay (D-KY)	February 15, 1893	
78	Henry Cabot Lodge (R-MA)	March 4, 1893	Former representative (6 years)
79	John Martin (D-KS)	March 4, 1893	
80	John L. Mitchell (D-WI)	March 4, 1893	Former representative (2 years)
81	Edward Murphy Jr. (D-NY)	March 4, 1893	New York 1st in population (1890)
82	James Smith Jr. (D-NJ)	March 4, 1893	New Jersey 18th in population (1890)
83	Stephen M. White (D-CA)	March 4, 1893	California 22nd in population (1890)
84	William V. Allen (PP-NE)	March 4, 1893	Nebraska 26th in population (1890)
85	William N. Roach (D-ND)	March 4, 1893	North Dakota 41st in population (1890)
	George C. Perkins (R-CA)	July 26, 1893	
	Anselm J. McLaurin (D-MS)	February 7, 1894	
	Newton C. Blanchard (D-LA)	March 12, 1894	
	Patrick Walsh (D-GA)	April 2, 1894	
	Thomas J. Jarvis (D-NC) (Note: Thomas J. Jarvis resigned January 23, 1895.)	April 19, 1894	
	John Patton Jr. (R-MI) (Note: John Patton Jr. resigned January 14, 1895.)	May 5, 1894	
	Lee Mantle (SR-MT)	January 16, 1895	
	Julius C. Burrows (R-MI)	January 23, 1895	
	Clarence D. Clark (R-WY)	January 24, 1895	Former representative
	Jeter C. Pritchard (R-NC)	January 24, 1895	
	John L. Wilson (R-WA)	February 19, 1895	

== See also ==
- 53rd United States Congress
- List of United States representatives in the 53rd Congress
