= John Haden Wilson =

American politician (1867–1946)

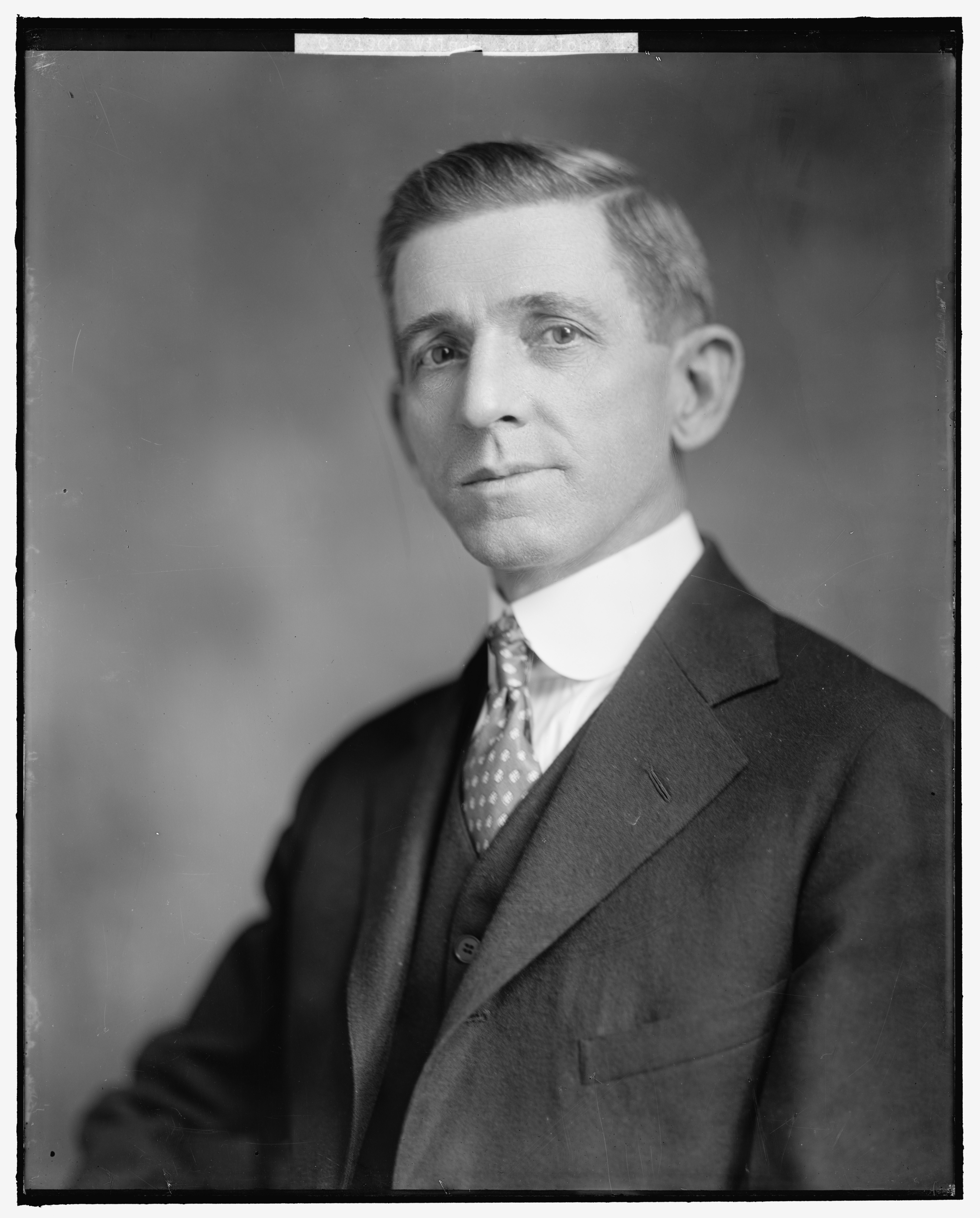
Harris & Ewing photograph, circa 1919.

John Haden Wilson (August 20, 1867 – January 28, 1946) was a Democratic member of the U.S. House of Representatives from Pennsylvania.

Wilson was born in Nashville, Tennessee. He moved with his parents to Harmony, Pennsylvania, the same year. He graduated from the Harmony Collegiate Institute, the Zelienople Academy, and from Grove City College. He studied law and was admitted to the bar in Butler, Pennsylvania, in 1893. He taught school, and commenced the practice of law in Butler in 1896. He was a member of the Pennsylvania National Guard for three years and served during the Homestead Riots. He served as was solicitor for the city of Butler from 1906 to 1934, except while a Member of Congress. He was a delegate to the Democratic National Conventions in 1916, 1932, 1936, and 1940.

Wilson was elected as a Democrat to the Sixty-sixth Congress to fill the vacancy caused by the death of Representative-elect Edward E. Robbins. He was an unsuccessful candidate for reelection in 1920. He resumed the practice of law, and served as judge of the several courts of Butler County, Pennsylvania, from 1933 to 1943. He died in Butler. Interment in North Cemetery.

== Sources ==
- United States Congress. "John H. Wilson (id: W000600)". Biographical Directory of the United States Congress.
- The Political Graveyard

U.S. House of Representatives
| Preceded by Edward E. Robbins | Member of the U.S. House of Representatives from Pennsylvania's 22nd congressional district 1919–1921 | Succeeded by Adam M. Wyant |
