= Daniel B. Heiner =

American lawyer and politician

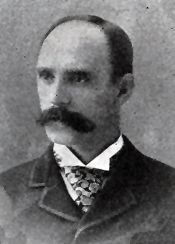

Member of the U.S. House of Representatives from Pennsylvania's 21st district
- In office March 4, 1893 – March 3, 1897
- Preceded by: George Franklin Huff
- Succeeded by: Edward Everett Robbins

Personal details
- Born: Daniel Brodhead Heiner; December 30, 1854 Kittanning, Pennsylvania
- Died: February 14, 1944 (aged 89) Kittanning, Pennsylvania
- Resting place: Kittanning Cemetery
- Party: Republican
- Education: Allegheny College; Dickinson School of Law

Daniel Brodhead Heiner (December 30, 1854 – February 14, 1944) was an American lawyer and politician who served as a two-term Republican member of the U.S. House of Representatives from Pennsylvania from 1893 to 1897.

== Biography ==
Daniel Brodhead Heiner, Jr. was born in Kittanning, Pennsylvania, the son of Daniel Brodhead Heiner, Sr. and Mary. G. Graham of Kittanning, Pennsylvania. He attended the public schools at Kittanning, Dayton Academy in Dayton, Pennsylvania, and Dickinson School of Law at Carlisle, Pennsylvania. He graduated from Allegheny College in Meadville, Pennsylvania, in 1879.

He was admitted to the bar of Armstrong County, Pennsylvania, in 1882 and commenced practice in Kittanning. He was also engaged in banking. He was elected district attorney of Armstrong County in 1885, reelected in 1888, and served until January 1, 1892. He was chairman of the Republican county executive committee from 1884 to 1888.

=== Family life ===
Heiner was a direct descendant of Revolutionary War veteran Brigadier General Daniel Brodhead, through his great-grandmother, Ann Garton Brodhead, who was Brodhead's elder daughter.

=== Congressman ===
Heiner was elected as a Republican to the Fifty-third and Fifty-fourth Congresses. He was not a candidate for renomination in 1896.

=== Later career ===
He was appointed by President William McKinley as United States district attorney for the Western District of Pennsylvania and served from 1897 to 1902.

He was appointed on February 2, 1902, as internal-revenue collector for the twenty-third district of Pennsylvania by President Theodore Roosevelt and served until November 1, 1913. He was a delegate to the 1920 Republican National Convention. He again served as internal-revenue collector from 1921 to 1933.

=== Death ===
He died in Kittanning in 1944, and was interred in the Kittanning Cemetery.

== Sources ==
- United States Congress. "Daniel B. Heiner (id: H000453)". Biographical Directory of the United States Congress.
- The Political Graveyard

U.S. House of Representatives
| Preceded by George F. Huff | Member of the U.S. House of Representatives from Pennsylvania's 21st congressional district 1893–1897 | Succeeded by Edward E. Robbins |
