= Pennsylvania's 21st congressional district =

Former U.S. House district in Pennsylvania

- Obsolete district
- Created: 1830
- Eliminated: 2000
- Years active: 1833-2003

Pennsylvania's twenty-first congressional district was a congressional district in northwestern Pennsylvania. It was created following the 1830 census and was disbanded after the 2000 census removed two representatives from Pennsylvania.

== List of members representing the district ==
Representatives	Party	Years	Cong ress	Electoral history
District established March 4, 1833
Thomas M. T. McKennan (Washington)	Anti-Masonic	March 4, 1833 – March 3, 1839	23rd 24th 25th	Redistricted from the 15th district and re-elected in 1832. Re-elected in 1834. Re-elected in 1836. [data missing]
Isaac Leet (Washington)	Democratic	March 4, 1839 – March 3, 1841	26th	Elected in 1838. [data missing]
Joseph Lawrence (Washington)	Whig	March 4, 1841 – April 17, 1842	27th	Elected in 1840. Died.
Vacant		April 17, 1842 – May 30, 1842	27th	
Thomas M. T. McKennan (Washington)	Whig	May 30, 1842 – March 3, 1843	27th	Elected to finish Lawrence's term. [data missing]
William Wilkins (Pittsburgh)	Democratic	March 4, 1843 – February 14, 1844	28th	Elected in 1843. Resigned to become U.S. Minister to Russia
Vacant		February 14, 1844 – March 26, 1844	28th	
Cornelius Darragh (Pittsburgh)	Whig	March 26, 1844 – March 3, 1847	28th 29th	Elected to finish Wilkins's term. Re-elected in 1844. [data missing]
Moses Hampton (Pittsburgh)	Whig	March 4, 1847 – March 3, 1851	30th 31st	Elected in 1846. Re-elected in 1848. [data missing]
Thomas M. Howe (Allegheny City)	Whig	March 4, 1851 – March 3, 1853	32nd	Elected in 1850. Redistricted to the 22nd district.
David Ritchie (Pittsburgh)	Whig	March 4, 1853 – March 3, 1855	33rd 34th 35th	Elected in 1852. Re-elected in 1854. Re-elected in 1856. [data missing]
David Ritchie (Pittsburgh)	Opposition	March 4, 1855 – March 3, 1857	33rd 34th 35th	Elected in 1852. Re-elected in 1854. Re-elected in 1856. [data missing]
David Ritchie (Pittsburgh)	Republican	March 4, 1857 – March 3, 1859	33rd 34th 35th	Elected in 1852. Re-elected in 1854. Re-elected in 1856. [data missing]
James K. Moorhead (Pittsburgh)	Republican	March 4, 1859 – March 3, 1863	36th 37th	Elected in 1858. Re-elected in 1860. Redistricted to the 22nd district.
John L. Dawson (Brownsville)	Democratic	March 4, 1863 – March 3, 1867	38th 39th	Elected in 1862. Re-elected in 1864. [data missing]
John Covode (Lockport)	Republican	March 4, 1867 – March 3, 1869	40th	Elected in 1866. Lost election contest.
Vacant		March 4, 1869 – February 9, 1870	41st	
John Covode (Lockport)	Republican	February 9, 1870 – January 11, 1871	41st	Won election contest. Died.
Vacant		January 11, 1871 – March 3, 1871	42nd	
Henry D. Foster (Greensburg)	Democratic	March 4, 1871 – March 3, 1873	42nd	Elected in 1870. [data missing]
Alexander W. Taylor (Indiana)	Republican	March 4, 1873 – March 3, 1875	43rd	Elected in 1872. [data missing]
Jacob Turney (Greensburg)	Democratic	March 4, 1875 – March 3, 1879	44th 45th	Elected in 1874. Re-elected in 1876. [data missing]
Morgan R. Wise (Waynesburg)	Democratic	March 4, 1879 – March 3, 1883	46th 47th	Elected in 1878. Re-elected in 1880. [data missing]
Charles E. Boyle (Uniontown)	Democratic	March 4, 1883 – March 3, 1887	48th 49th	Elected in 1882. Re-elected in 1884. [data missing]
Welty McCullogh (Greensburg)	Republican	March 4, 1887 – March 3, 1889	50th	Elected in 1886. [data missing]
Samuel A. Craig (Brookville)	Republican	March 4, 1889 – March 3, 1891	51st	Elected in 1888. [data missing]
George F. Huff (Greensburg)	Republican	March 4, 1891 – March 3, 1893	52nd	Elected in 1890. [data missing]
Daniel B. Heiner (Kittanning)	Republican	March 4, 1893 – March 3, 1897	53rd 54th	Elected in 1892. Re-elected in 1894. [data missing]
Edward E. Robbins (Greensburg)	Republican	March 4, 1897 – March 3, 1899	55th	Elected in 1896. [data missing]
Summers M. Jack (Indiana)	Republican	March 4, 1899 – March 3, 1903	56th 57th	Elected in 1898. Re-elected in 1900. [data missing]
Solomon R. Dresser (Bradford)	Republican	March 4, 1903 – March 3, 1907	58th 59th	Elected in 1902. Re-elected in 1904. [data missing]
Charles F. Barclay (Sinnemahoning)	Republican	March 4, 1907 – March 3, 1911	60th 61st	Elected in 1906. Re-elected in 1908. [data missing]
Charles E. Patton (Curwensville)	Republican	March 4, 1911 – March 3, 1915	62nd 63rd	Elected in 1910. Re-elected in 1912. [data missing]
Charles H. Rowland (Philispburg)	Republican	March 4, 1915 – March 3, 1919	64th 65th	Elected in 1914. Re-elected in 1916. [data missing]
Evan J. Jones (Bradford)	Republican	March 4, 1919 – March 3, 1923	66th 67th	Elected in 1918. Re-elected in 1920. [data missing]
Jacob B. Kurtz (Altoona)	Republican	March 4, 1923 – March 3, 1933	68th 69th 70th 71st 72nd	Elected in 1922. Re-elected in 1924. Re-elected in 1926. Re-elected in 1928. Re-elected in 1930. Redistricted to the 23rd district.
Francis E. Walter (Easton)	Democratic	March 4, 1933 – January 3, 1945	73rd 74th 75th 76th 77th 78th	Elected in 1932. Re-elected in 1934. Re-elected in 1936. Re-elected in 1938. Re-elected in 1940. Re-elected in 1942. Redistricted to the 20th district.
Chester H. Gross (York)	Republican	January 3, 1945 – January 3, 1949	79th 80th	Redistricted from the 22nd district and re-elected in 1944. Re-elected in 1946. [data missing]
James F. Lind (York)	Democratic	January 3, 1949 – January 3, 1953	81st 82nd	Elected in 1948. Re-elected in 1950. [data missing]
Augustine B. Kelley (Greensburg)	Democratic	January 3, 1953 – November 20, 1957	83rd 84th 85th	Redistricted from the 27th district and re-elected in 1952. Re-elected in 1954. Re-elected in 1956. Died.
Vacant		November 20, 1957 – January 21, 1958	85th	
John H. Dent (Ligonier)	Democratic	January 21, 1958 – January 3, 1979	85th 86th 87th 88th 89th 90th 91st 92nd 93rd 94th 95th	Elected to finish Kelley's term. Re-elected in 1958. Re-elected in 1960. Re-elected in 1962. Re-elected in 1964. Re-elected in 1966. Re-elected in 1968. Re-elected in 1970. Re-elected in 1972. Re-elected in 1974. Re-elected in 1976. [data missing]
Donald A. Bailey (Greensburg)	Democratic	January 3, 1979 – January 3, 1983	96th 97th	Elected in 1978. Re-elected in 1980. Redistricted to the 12th district and Lost renomination.
Tom Ridge (Erie)	Republican	January 3, 1983 – January 3, 1995	98th 99th 100th 101st 102nd 103rd	Elected in 1982. Re-elected in 1984. Re-elected in 1986. Re-elected in 1988. Re-elected in 1990. Re-elected in 1992. Retired to run for Governor of Pennsylvania
Phil English (Erie)	Republican	January 3, 1995 – January 3, 2003	104th 105th 106th 107th	Elected in 1994. Re-elected in 1996. Re-elected in 1998. Re-elected in 2000. Redistricted to the 3rd district.
District dissolved January 3, 2003

== Recent election history ==
Year	Democratic			Republican			Independent			Other and write-in		
Year	Candidate	Votes	Pct	Candidate	Votes	Pct	Candidate	Votes	Pct	Candidate	Votes	Pct
1992	John C. Harkins	70,802	32%	√ Thomas J. Ridge	150,729	68%						
1994	Bill Leavens	84,796	47%	√ Phil English	89,439	49%	Arthur E. Drew	6,588	4%	(assorted)	6	0%
1996	Ronald A. DiNicola	104,004	49%	√ Phil English	106,875	51%				(assorted)	9	0%
1998	Larry Klemens	54,591	37%	√ Phil English	94,518	63%				(assorted)	6	0%
2000	Marc A. Flitter	87,018	39%	√ Phil English	135,164	61%						
