= William Lilly (politician) =

American politician (1821–1893)

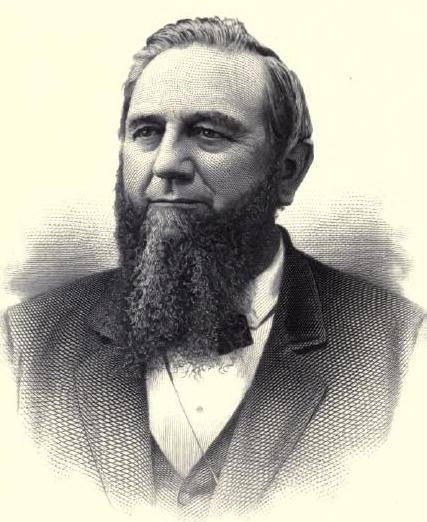

Member of the U.S. House of Representatives from Pennsylvania
- In office March 4, 1893 – December 1, 1893
- Preceded by: No at-large districts in Pennsylvania in 52nd Congress
- Succeeded by: Galusha A. Grow
- Constituency: at-large district

Personal details
- Born: June 3, 1821 Penn Yan, New York, U.S.
- Died: December 1, 1893 (aged 72) Mauch Chunk, Pennsylvania, U.S.
- Resting place: City Cemetery in Mauch Chunk, Pennsylvania
- Party: Republican

William Lilly (June 3, 1821 – December 1, 1893) served briefly as a Republican member of the U.S. House of Representatives from Pennsylvania in 1893.

== Formative years ==
Born in Penn Yan, New York, on June 3, 1821, Lilly moved to Carbon County, Pennsylvania, in 1838, and became involved in the mining of anthracite coal.

=== Military service ===
He was subsequently elected as colonel of one of the militia regiments of the Lehigh Valley and then was promoted to the rank of brigadier general.

== Career ==
A Democratic member of the Pennsylvania State House of Representatives in 1850 and 1851, he switched to the Republican Party in 1862, and was appointed as a delegate to six Republican National Conventions. He was then appointed as a delegate at large to the convention to revise the constitution of Pennsylvania in 1872 and 1873.

=== Congress ===
Lilly was later elected as a Republican to the Fifty-third Congress and served in that capacity until his death in 1893.

== Death and interment ==
Lilly died in Mauch Chunk, Pennsylvania, on December 1, 1893, and was interred in the City Cemetery.

== See also ==
- List of members of the United States Congress who died in office (1790–1899)

== Sources ==
- United States Congress. "William Lilly (id: L000312)". Biographical Directory of the United States Congress.
- The Political Graveyard

U.S. House of Representatives
Preceded by At-large: None	Member of the U.S. House of Representatives from Pennsylvania's at-large congressional district 1893 alongside: Alexander McDowell	Succeeded by At-large: Galusha A. Grow; Alexander McDowell
