= Galusha A. Grow =

American politician, lawyer, writer and businessman (1823–1907)

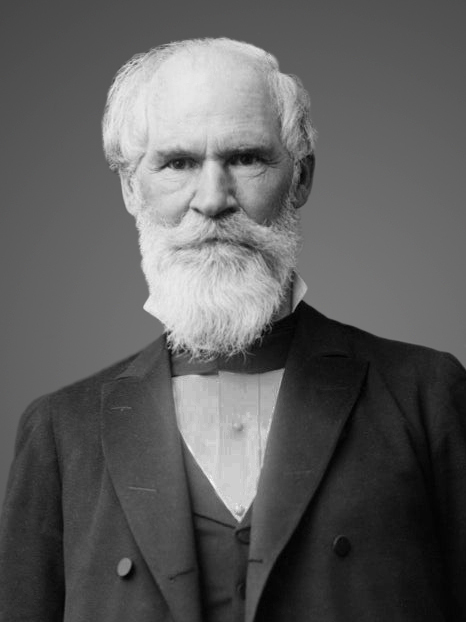
- Grow, c. 1865–1880

24th Speaker of the United States House of Representatives
- In office July 4, 1861 – March 4, 1863
- Preceded by: William Pennington
- Succeeded by: Schuyler Colfax

Leader of the House Republican Conference
- In office July 4, 1861 – March 4, 1863
- Preceded by: William Pennington
- Succeeded by: Schuyler Colfax

Member of the U.S. House of Representatives from Pennsylvania
- In office February 26, 1894 – March 3, 1903
- Preceded by: William Lilly
- Succeeded by: John M. Morin (1913)
- Constituency: at-large district
- In office March 4, 1851 – March 3, 1863
- Preceded by: David Wilmot
- Succeeded by: William Henry Miller
- Constituency: 12th district (1851–53); 14th district (1853–63)

Personal details
- Born: Aaron Galusha Grow; August 31, 1823 Ashford, Connecticut, U.S.
- Died: March 31, 1907 (aged 83) Glenwood, Pennsylvania, U.S.
- Party: Democratic (1850–1857); Republican (1857–1907)
- Education: Amherst College
- Profession: Attorney
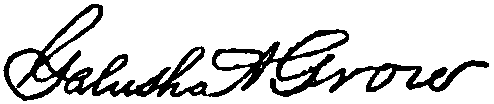
- Signature

Galusha Aaron Grow (August 31, 1823 – March 31, 1907) was the 24th speaker of the United States House of Representatives, serving from 1861 to 1863. Elected as a Democrat in the 1850 congressional elections, he switched to the newly organized Republican Party in the mid-1850s when the Democratic Party tried to force the extension of slavery into western territories.

Elected speaker for the 37th Congress, Grow presided over the House during the initial years of the American Civil War. During his tenure Congress passed the landmark Homestead Act of 1862, which he supported. Grow was defeated for reelection in 1862. For over a century he remained the last incumbent House speaker to be defeated, until Speaker Tom Foley lost his seat in 1994.

After leaving office he continued to speak out on political issues, but did not serve in elective office. Then, 31 years after leaving office, Grow won an 1894 special election to succeed William Lilly. It remains one of the longest known interregnums between terms of service for a House member. Over the course of his career, Grow represented the people of three Pennsylvania congressional districts: the 12th district (1851–1853), 14th district (1853–1863), and Pennsylvania's at-large congressional district (1894–1903).

== Early life and education ==
Grow was born Aaron Galusha Grow in Ashford, Connecticut. His given names were the suggestions of an aunt living in Vermont, who was visiting Grow's mother when he was christened: "Aaron" was the aunt's husband's name (his full name was Aaron Nichols (1764–1807)), and "Galusha" was the surname of a governor of Vermont she admired. His family called him Galusha when he was growing up, and before Grow was a teenager, he had started writing his name with his given names reversed. He was educated at Franklin Academy in Susquehanna County, Pennsylvania, and later at Amherst College. He studied law and was admitted to the bar in November 1847 and then began his law practice.

== Political career ==
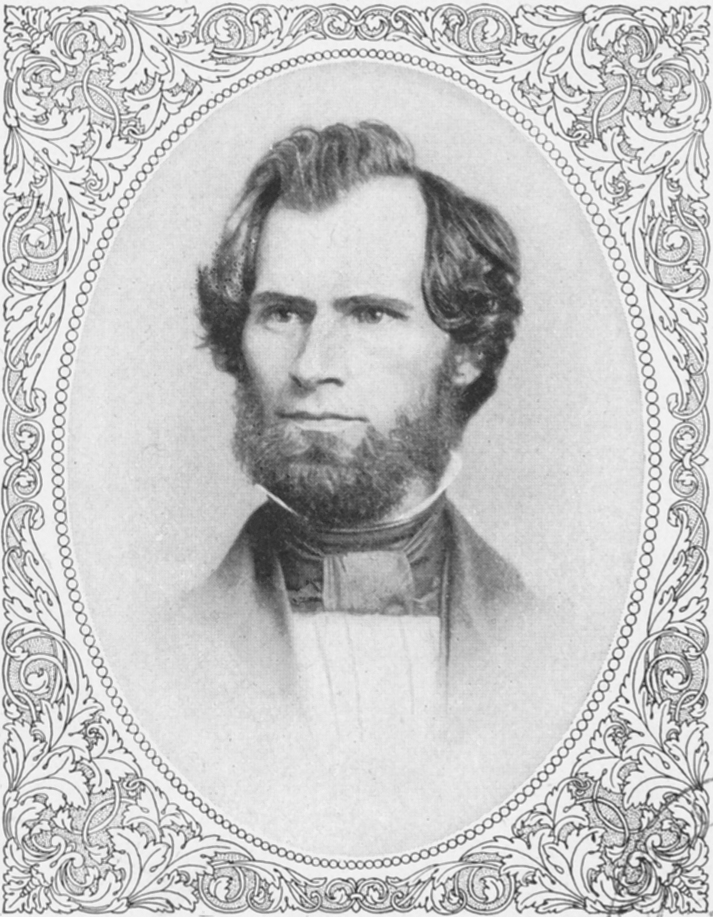
Galusha Grow, c. 1859

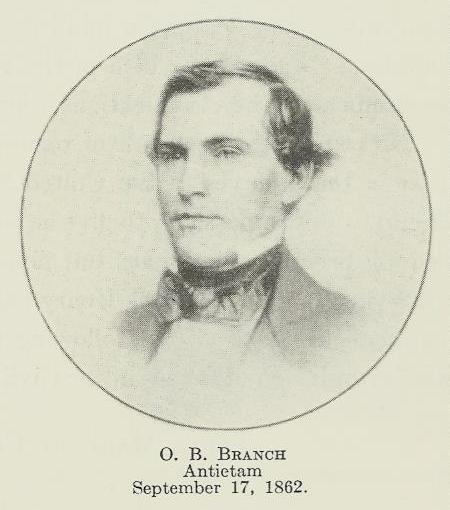
Lawrence O'Bryan Branch

=== Early elections ===
Grow ran as a Democrat in the 1850 election and served as a member of that party during the 32nd and 33rd congresses, and into the 34th Congress. He switched parties in the wake of President Pierce's signing of the Kansas-Nebraska Act. He ran as a Republican in the 1856 election and remained a member of that party for the rest of his political career.

=== Congressional brawl of 1858 ===
During the 35th United States Congress, on February 5, 1858, he was physically attacked by Democrat Laurence M. Keitt in the House chambers, leading to a brawl between northerners and southerners. Keitt, offended by Grow's having stepped over to his side of the House chamber, dismissively demanded that Grow sit down, calling him a "black Republican puppy". Grow responded by telling Keitt that "No negro-driver shall crack his whip over me." Keitt became enraged and went for Grow's throat, shouting that he would "choke [him] for that". A large brawl involving approximately fifty representatives erupted on the House floor, ending only when a missed punch from Rep. Cadwallader Washburn upended the hairpiece of Rep. William Barksdale. The embarrassed Barksdale accidentally replaced the wig backwards, causing both sides to erupt in spontaneous laughter.

Later that year Grow was re-elected to a fifth term. When the next Congress convened in December 1859, he was one of 90 congressmen to receive votes during the two-month-long 44-ballot speaker election, dropping out following the first ballot. On December 29, 1859, North Carolina Congressman Lawrence O'Bryan Branch challenged Galusha Grow to a duel after the two exchanged insults on the House Floor. Both men and their seconds were arrested by District of Columbia police before the duel could take place.

=== 1861 speaker election ===
The deepening rift between slave states and free states overshadowed Grow's 1861 re-election victory, as a national crisis erupted in December 1860 when South Carolina became the first of several Southern states to adopt an Ordinance of Secession. Four months later, on April 12, 1861, Confederate forces fired upon Fort Sumter, igniting the Civil War. In response, President Abraham Lincoln called the 37th Congress into session on July 4. When the House convened that day, Grow was nominated to be Speaker of the House; also nominated was Francis Preston Blair Jr. Grow was elected on the first ballot, but only after Blair withdrew following the roll call vote, at which time 28 votes shifted to Grow.

1861 election for speaker – 159 votes cast, 80 votes necessary to win election:
■ Galusha A. Grow (R–Pennsylvania) 99
■ Francis Preston Blair Jr. (R–Missouri) 12
■ John J. Crittenden (CU–Kentucky) 12
■ John S. Phelps (D–Missouri) 7
■ Clement Vallandingham (D–Ohio) 7
■ Erastus Corning (D–New York) 7
■ Samuel S. Cox (D–Ohio) 6
■ Others 9

Although events of the war dominated and the First Battle of Bull Run occurred only two weeks after the 37th Congress was called into session, under Grow's leadership, several major acts of Congress were passed and signed into law, particularly the Morrill Land-Grant College Act (passed House June 17, 1862), the Pacific Railway Act authorizing land grants to encourage the construction of the transcontinental railroad, and the Homestead Act, which in over a century resulted in the establishment of 1.6 million homesteads.

=== Loss of congressional seat and interim ===
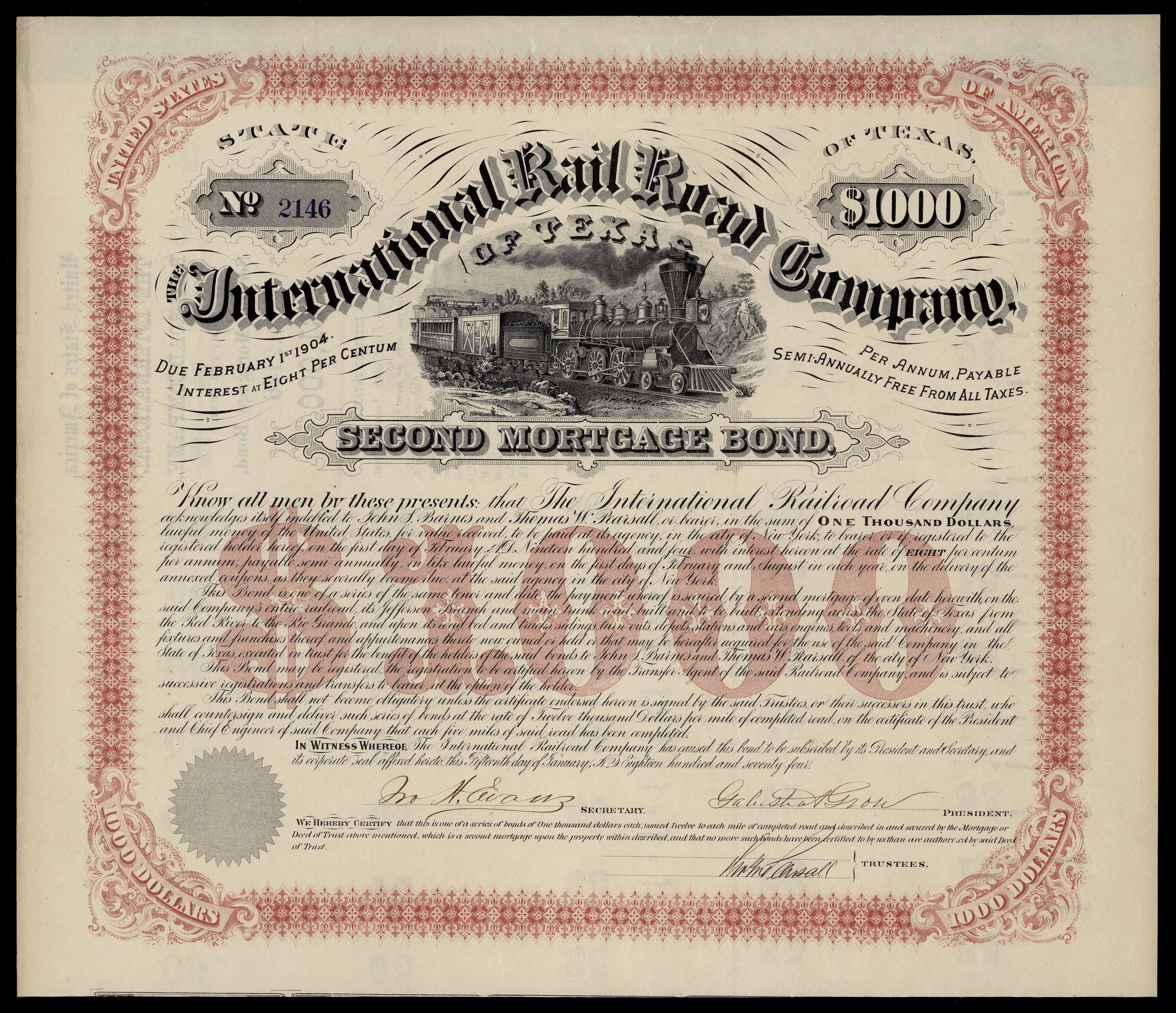
Second Mortgage Bond of the International Rail Road Company of Texas, issued 15 January 1874, signed by president Galusha A. Grow.

Grow, a supporter of the Radical Republicans, was defeated in his re-election bid in 1862, becoming the second sitting House Speaker in a row to lose his seat.

Grow was a delegate to the Republican National Convention in 1864 and 1868.

He moved to Houston, Texas in 1871, and that year became president of what became known as the International - Great Northern Railroad, a position he held until 1875. He then returned to Pennsylvania and the practice of law from 1875 to 1894.

=== Return to Congress ===
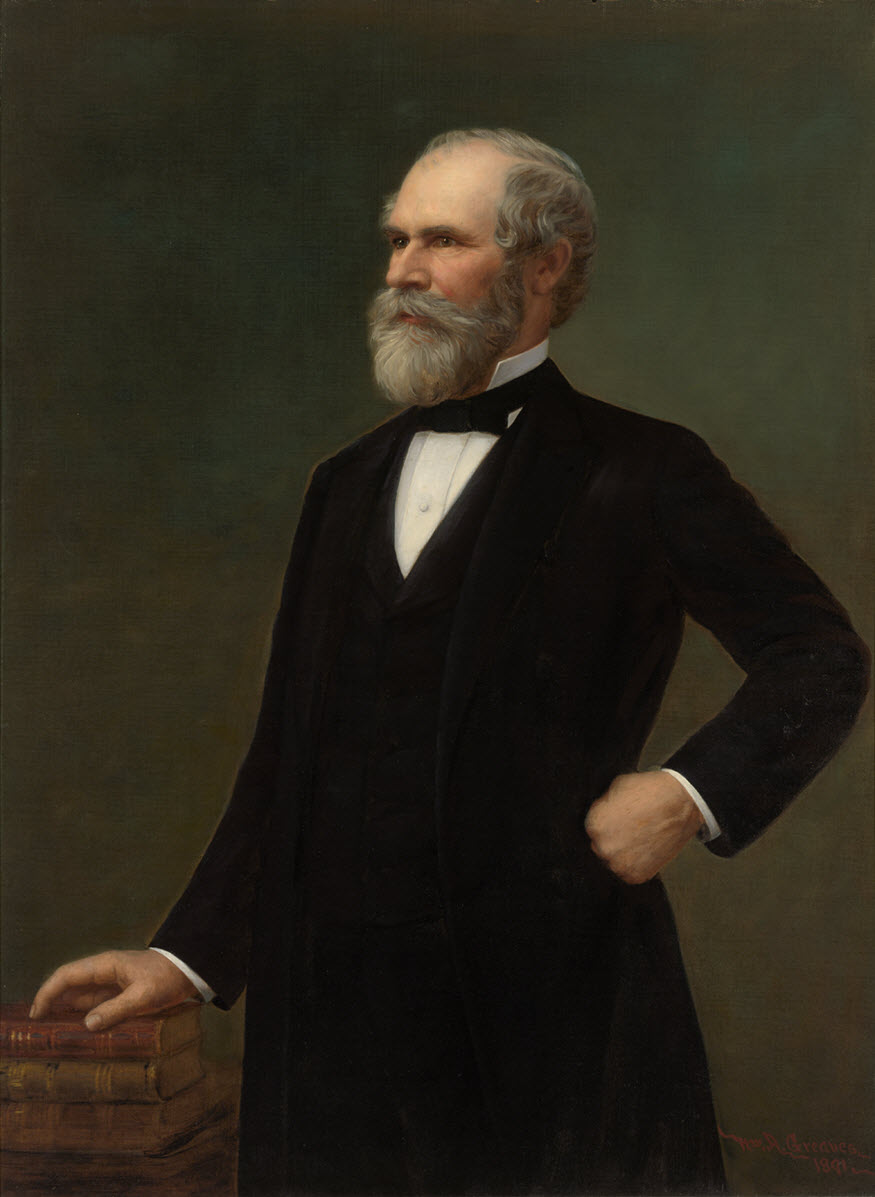
Galusha Grow, 1891

Grow returned to the United States Congress as a member at-large from Pennsylvania from 1894 to 1903; was the chairman of the committee on education in the 56th Congress.

== Death and legacy ==
Grow resided in Glenwood, Pennsylvania, from 1903 until his death there on March 31, 1907. A biography of Galusha Grow, Galusha A. Grow: Father of the Homestead Law, was written by James T. Du Bois and Gertrude S. Mathews and published by Houghton Mifflin in 1917.

A monument to Grow was erected in 1915 at the Susquehanna County Courthouse Complex in Montrose, Pennsylvania.

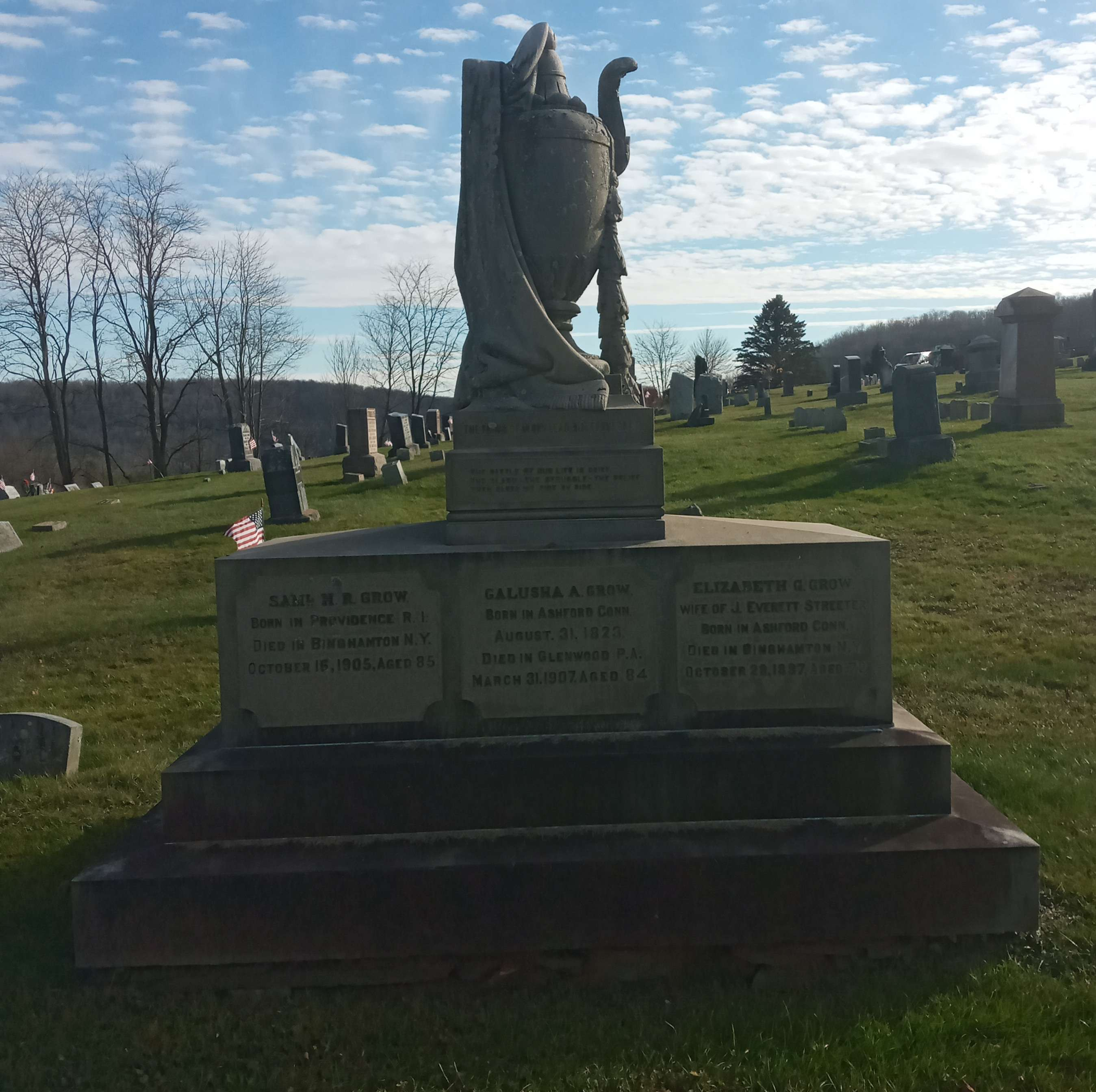
The gravesite of Speaker Grow

== See also ==
- List of American politicians who switched parties in office
- List of United States representatives who switched parties

U.S. House of Representatives
Preceded by David Wilmot	Member of the U.S. House of Representatives from Pennsylvania's 12th congressional district March 4, 1851 – March 3, 1853	Succeeded by Hendrick B. Wright
Preceded by Thomas M. Bibighaus	Member of the U.S. House of Representatives from Pennsylvania's 14th congressional district March 4, 1853 – March 3, 1863	Succeeded by William H. Miller
Preceded by William Lilly	Member of the U.S. House of Representatives from Pennsylvania's at-large congressional district February 26, 1894 – March 3, 1903	Succeeded by Vacant
Political offices
Preceded by William Pennington	Speaker of the U.S. House of Representatives; July 4, 1861 – March 4, 1863	Succeeded by Schuyler Colfax
