= List of former United States representatives (M) =

This is a complete list of former United States representatives whose last names begin with the letter M.

== Number of years and terms the member has served ==
The number of years the representative/delegate has served in Congress indicates the number of terms the representative/delegate has. Note the representative/delegate can also serve non-consecutive terms if the representative/delegate loses election and wins re-election to the House.

- 2 years - 1 or 2 terms
- 4 years - 2 or 3 terms
- 6 years - 3 or 4 terms
- 8 years - 4 or 5 terms
- 10 years - 5 or 6 terms
- 12 years - 6 or 7 terms
- 14 years - 7 or 8 terms
- 16 years - 8 or 9 terms
- 18 years - 9 or 10 terms
- 20 years - 10 or 11 terms
- 22 years - 11 or 12 terms
- 24 years - 12 or 13 terms
- 26 years - 13 or 14 terms
- 28 years - 14 or 15 terms
- 30 years - 15 or 16 terms
- 32 years - 16 or 17 terms
- 34 years - 17 or 18 terms
- 36 years - 18 or 19 terms
- 38 years - 19 or 20 terms
- 40 years - 20 or 21 terms
- 42 years - 21 or 22 terms
- 44 years - 22 or 23 terms
- 46 years - 23 or 24 terms
- 48 years - 24 or 25 terms
- 50 years - 25 or 26 terms
- 52 years - 26 or 27 terms
- 54 years - 27 or 28 terms
- 56 years - 28 or 29 terms
- 58 years - 29 or 30 terms

Name	Term	State/ Territory	Party	Lifespan
Melvin Maas	1927–1933; 1935–1945	Minnesota	Republican	1898–1964
Tom MacArthur	2015–2019	New Jersey	Republican	1960–present
John MacCrate	1919–1920	New York	Republican	1885–1976
John L. MacDonald	1887–1889	Minnesota	Democratic	1838–1903
Moses Macdonald	1851–1855	Maine	Democratic	1815–1869
Torbert Macdonald	1955–1976	Massachusetts	Democratic	1917–1976
William Josiah MacDonald	1913–1915	Michigan	Progressive	1873–1946
Clinton D. MacDougall	1873–1877	New York	Republican	1839–1914
Daniel Mace	1851–1855	Indiana	Democratic	1811–1867
Daniel Mace	1855–1857	Indiana	Oppositionist	1811–1867
Clarence MacGregor	1919–1928	New York	Republican	1872–1952
Clark MacGregor	1961–1971	Minnesota	Republican	1922–2003
Hervey Machen	1965–1969	Maryland	Democratic	1916–1994
James Machir	1797–1799	Virginia	Federalist	1764–1827
Thaddeus M. Machrowicz	1951–1961	Michigan	Democratic	1899–1970
Ronald Machtley	1989–1995	Rhode Island	Republican	1948–present
A. F. Maciejewski	1939–1942	Illinois	Democratic	1893–1949
Archibald T. MacIntyre	1871–1873	Georgia	Democratic	1822–1900
Lucien J. Maciora	1941–1943	Connecticut	Democratic	1902–1993
Connie Mack III	1983–1989	Florida	Republican	1940–present
Connie Mack IV	2005–2013	Florida	Republican	1967–present
Peter F. Mack Jr.	1949–1963	Illinois	Democratic	1916–1986
Russell V. Mack	1947–1960	Washington	Republican	1891–1960
Buddy MacKay	1983–1989	Florida	Democratic	1933–2024
James MacKay	1965–1967	Georgia	Democratic	1919–2004
Edmund W. M. Mackey	1875–1876	South Carolina	Independent Republican	1846–1884
Edmund W. M. Mackey	1882–1884	South Carolina	Republican	1846–1884
Levi A. Mackey	1875–1879	Pennsylvania	Democratic	1819–1889
John C. Mackie	1965–1967	Michigan	Democratic	1920–2008
George MacKinnon	1947–1949	Minnesota	Republican	1906–1995
James H. MacLafferty	1922–1925	California	Republican	1871–1937
Samuel Maclay	1795–1797	Pennsylvania	Democratic-Republican	1741–1811
William Maclay	1815–1819	Pennsylvania	Democratic-Republican	1765–1825
William B. Maclay	1843–1849; 1857–1861	New York	Democratic	1812–1882
William Plunkett Maclay	1816–1821	Pennsylvania	Democratic-Republican	1774–1842
Nathaniel Macon	1791–1795	North Carolina	Anti-Administration	1757–1837
Nathaniel Macon	1795–1815	North Carolina	Democratic-Republican	1757–1837
Robert B. Macon	1903–1913	Arkansas	Democratic	1859–1925
John B. Macy	1853–1855	Wisconsin	Democratic	1799–1856
W. Kingsland Macy	1947–1951	New York	Republican	1889–1961
Martin B. Madden	1905–1928	Illinois	Republican	1855–1928
Ray Madden	1943–1977	Indiana	Democratic	1892–1987
John W. Maddox	1893–1905	Georgia	Democratic	1848–1922
Ed Madigan	1973–1991	Illinois	Republican	1936–1994
Edmond H. Madison	1907–1911	Kansas	Republican	1865–1911
James Madison	1789–1795	Virginia	Anti-Administration	1751–1836
James Madison	1795–1797	Virginia	Democratic-Republican	1751–1836
Dan Maffei	2009–2011; 2013–2015	New York	Democratic	1968–present
James T. Maffett	1887–1889	Pennsylvania	Republican	1837–1912
Clare Magee	1949–1953	Missouri	Democratic	1899–1969
James M. Magee	1923–1927	Pennsylvania	Republican	1877–1949
John Magee	1827–1831	New York	Democratic	1794–1868
John A. Magee	1873–1875	Pennsylvania	Democratic	1827–1903
Walter W. Magee	1915–1927	New York	Republican	1861–1927
Martin Maginnis	1873–1885	Montana	Republican	1841–1919
Thomas F. Magner	1889–1895	New York	Democratic	1860–1945
Don Magnuson	1953–1963	Washington	Democratic	1911–1979
Warren Magnuson	1937–1944	Washington	Democratic	1905–1989
Henry S. Magoon	1875–1877	Wisconsin	Republican	1832–1889
Frederick W. Magrady	1925–1933	Pennsylvania	Republican	1863–1954
Patrick Magruder	1805–1807	Maryland	Democratic-Republican	1768–1819
Andrew Maguire	1975–1981	New Jersey	Democratic	1939–present
James G. Maguire	1893–1899	California	Democratic	1853–1920
John A. Maguire	1909–1915	Nebraska	Democratic	1870–1939
Bryan F. Mahan	1913–1915	Connecticut	Democratic	1856–1923
Rowland B. Mahany	1895–1899	New York	Republican	1864–1937
James P. Maher	1911–1921	New York	Democratic	1865–1946
Gabriel H. Mahon Jr.	1936–1939	South Carolina	Democratic	1889–1962
George H. Mahon	1935–1979	Texas	Democratic	1900–1985
Thaddeus M. Mahon	1903–1907	Pennsylvania	Republican	1840–1916
Peter P. Mahoney	1885–1889	New York	Democratic	1848–1889
Tim Mahoney	2007–2009	Florida	Democratic	1956–present
William F. Mahoney	1901–1904	Illinois	Democratic	1856–1904
William S. Mailliard	1953–1974	California	Republican	1917–1992
Verner Main	1935–1937	Michigan	Republican	1885–1965
Levi Maish	1875-1879; 1887-1891	Pennsylvania	Democratic	1837–1899
Denise Majette	2003–2005	Georgia	Democratic	1955–present
James Earl Major	1923–1925; 1927–1929; 1931–1933	Illinois	Democratic	1887–1972
Samuel C. Major	1919–1921; 1923–1929; 1931	Missouri	Democratic	1869–1931
Thomas Jefferson Majors	1878–1879	Nebraska	Republican	1841–1932
Francis Malbone	1793–1795	Rhode Island	Pro-Administration	1759–1809
Francis Malbone	1795–1797	Rhode Island	Federalist	1759–1809
George R. Malby	1907–1912	New York	Republican	1857–1912
Tom Malinowski	2019–2023	New Jersey	Democratic	1965–present
Richard W. Mallary	1972–1975	Vermont	Republican	1929–2011
Rollin Carolas Mallary	1820–1825	Vermont	Democratic-Republican	1784–1831
Rollin Carolas Mallary	1825–1831	Vermont	National Republican	1784–1831
Francis Mallory	1837–1843	Virginia	Whig	1807–1860
Meredith Mallory	1839–1841	New York	Democratic	1781–1855
Robert Mallory	1859–1861	Kentucky	Oppositionist	1815–1885
Robert Mallory	1861–1865	Kentucky	Unionist	1815–1885
Rufus Mallory	1867–1869	Oregon	Republican	1831–1914
Stephen Mallory II	1891–1895	Florida	Democratic	1848–1907
Carolyn Maloney	1993–2023	New York	Democratic	1946–present
Francis T. Maloney	1933–1935	Connecticut	Democratic	1894–1945
Franklin J. Maloney	1947–1949	Pennsylvania	Republican	1899–1958
James H. Maloney	1997–2003	Connecticut	Democratic	1948–present
Paul H. Maloney	1931–1940; 1943–1947	Louisiana	Democratic	1876–1967
Robert S. Maloney	1921–1923	Massachusetts	Republican	1881–1934
Sean Patrick Maloney	2013–2023	New York	Democratic	1966–present
James Manahan	1913–1915	Minnesota	Republican	1866–1932
Carter Manasco	1941–1949	Alabama	Democratic	1902–1992
Willie P. Mangum	1823–1825	North Carolina	Democratic-Republican	1792–1861
Willie P. Mangum	1825–1826	North Carolina	Democratic	1792–1861
Helen Douglas Mankin	1946–1947	Georgia	Democratic	1896–1956
Joe J. Manlove	1923–1933	Missouri	Republican	1876–1956
Abijah Mann Jr.	1833–1837	New York	Republican	1793–1868
David S. Mann	1993–1995	Ohio	Democratic	1939–present
Edward C. Mann	1919–1921	South Carolina	Democratic	1880–1931
Horace Mann	1848–1851	Massachusetts	Whig	1796–1859
Horace Mann	1851–1853	Massachusetts	Free Soiler	1796–1859
James Mann	1868	Louisiana	Democratic	1822–1868
James R. Mann	1897–1922	Illinois	Republican	1856–1922
James Mann	1969–1979	South Carolina	Democratic	1920–2010
Job Mann	1835-1837; 1847-1851	Pennsylvania	Democratic	1795–1873
Joel Keith Mann	1831–1835	Pennsylvania	Democratic	1780–1857
John Manning Jr.	1870–1871	North Carolina	Democratic	1830–1899
Kathy Manning	2021–2025	North Carolina	Democratic	1956–present
Richard Irvine Manning I	1834–1836	South Carolina	Democratic	1789–1836
Van H. Manning	1877–1883	Mississippi	Democratic	1839–1892
Joseph J. Mansfield	1917–1947	Texas	Democratic	1861–1947
Mike Mansfield	1943–1953	Montana	Democratic	1903–2001
Mahlon Dickerson Manson	1871–1873	Indiana	Democratic	1820–1895
Charles H. Mansur	1887–1893	Missouri	Democratic	1835–1895
Thomas Manton	1985–1999	New York	Democratic	1932–2006
Francisco Antonio Manzanares	1884–1885	New Mexico	Democratic	1843–1904
Don Manzullo	1993–2013	Illinois	Republican	1944–present
Carl E. Mapes	1913–1939	Michigan	Republican	1874–1939
John Hartwell Marable	1825–1829	Tennessee	Democratic	1786–1844
Joseph J. Maraziti	1973–1975	New Jersey	Republican	1912–1991
Vito Marcantonio	1935–1937	New York	Republican	1902–1954
Vito Marcantonio	1939–1951	New York	American Laborite	1902–1954
Albert Gallatin Marchand	1839–1843	Pennsylvania	Democratic	1811–1848
David Marchand	1817–1821	Pennsylvania	Democratic-Republican	1776–1832
Kenny Marchant	2005–2021	Texas	Republican	1951–present
Daniel Marcy	1863–1865	New Hampshire	Democratic	1809–1893
Samuel W. Mardis	1831–1835	Alabama	Democratic	1800–1836
Marjorie Margolies	1993–1995	Pennsylvania	Democratic	1942–present
Tom Marino	2011–2019	Pennsylvania	Republican	1952–present
Robert Marion	1805–1810	South Carolina	Democratic-Republican	1766–1811
Henry Markell	1825–1829	New York	National Republican	1792–1831
Jacob Markell	1813–1815	New York	Federalist	1770–1852
Betsy Markey	2009–2011	Colorado	Democratic	1956–present
Ed Markey	1976–2013	Massachusetts	Democratic	1946–present
Henry Markham	1885–1887	California	Republican	1840–1923
Philip S. Markley	1823–1825	Pennsylvania	Democratic-Republican	1789–1834
Philip S. Markley	1825–1827	Pennsylvania	National Republican	1789–1834
Marc L. Marks	1977–1983	Pennsylvania	Republican	1927–2018
E. W. Marland	1933–1935	Oklahoma	Democratic	1874–1941
Ron Marlenee	1977–1993	Montana	Republican	1935–2020
Turner M. Marquett	1867	Nebraska	Republican	1831–1894
Alem Marr	1829–1831	Pennsylvania	Democratic	1787–1843
George Washington Lent Marr	1817–1819	Tennessee	Democratic-Republican	1779–1856
David Daniel Marriott	1977–1985	Utah	Republican	1939–present
John H. Marsalis	1949–1951	Colorado	Democratic	1904–1971
Benjamin F. Marsh	1877–1883; 1893–1901; 1903–1905	Illinois	Republican	1839–1905
Charles Marsh	1815–1817	Vermont	Federalist	1765-1849
George Perkins Marsh	1843–1849	Vermont	Whig	1801–1882
John O. Marsh Jr.	1963–1971	Virginia	Democratic	1926–2019
Alexander Keith Marshall	1855–1857	Kentucky	American	1808–1884
Alfred Marshall	1841–1843	Maine	Democratic	c. 1797–1868
Edward C. Marshall	1851–1853	California	Democratic	1821–1893
Fred Marshall	1949–1963	Minnesota	Democratic-Farmer-Labor	1906–1985
George Alexander Marshall	1897–1899	Ohio	Democratic	1851–1899
Humphrey Marshall	1849–1852	Kentucky	Whig	1812–1872
Humphrey Marshall	1855–1859	Kentucky	American	1812–1872
James W. Marshall	1893–1895	Virginia	Democratic	1844–1911
Jim Marshall	2003–2011	Georgia	Democratic	1948–present
John Marshall	1799–1800	Virginia	Federalist	1755–1835
L. L. Marshall	1939–1941	Ohio	Republican	1888–1958
Leroy T. Marshall	1933–1937	Ohio	Republican	1883–1950
Roger Marshall	2017–2021	Kansas	Republican	1960–present
Samuel S. Marshall	1855–1859; 1865–1875	Illinois	Democratic	1821–1890
Thomas A. Marshall	1831–1835	Kentucky	National Republican	1794–1871
Thomas Francis Marshall	1841–1843	Kentucky	Whig	1801–1864
Thomas F. Marshall	1901–1909	North Dakota	Republican	1854–1921
Gilman Marston	1859–1863; 1865–1867	New Hampshire	Republican	1811–1890
Augustus N. Martin	1889–1895	Indiana	Democratic	1847–1901
Barclay Martin	1845–1847	Tennessee	Democratic	1802–1890
Benjamin F. Martin	1877–1881	West Virginia	Democratic	1828–1895
Charles Martin	1917	Illinois	Democratic	1856–1917
Charles D. Martin	1859–1861	Ohio	Democratic	1829–1911
Charles Henry Martin	1896–1899	North Carolina	Populist	1848–1931
Charles Martin	1931–1935	Oregon	Democratic	1863–1946
David O'Brien Martin	1981–1993	New York	Republican	1944–2012
David Martin	1961–1974	Nebraska	Republican	1907–1997
Eben Martin	1901–1907; 1908–1915	South Dakota	Republican	1855–1932
Edward L. Martin	1879–1883	Delaware	Democratic	1837-1897
Elbert S. Martin	1859–1861	Virginia	Independent Democratic	c. 1829-1876
Frederick S. Martin	1851–1853	New York	Whig	1794-1865
James D. Martin	1965–1967	Alabama	Republican	1918–2017
James G. Martin	1973–1985	North Carolina	Republican	1935–present
James Stewart Martin	1873–1875	Illinois	Republican	1826–1907
John Andrew Martin	1909–1913; 1933–1939	Colorado	Democratic	1868–1939
John C. Martin	1939–1941	Illinois	Democratic	1880–1952
John Mason Martin	1885–1887	Alabama	Democratic	1837–1898
John Preston Martin	1845–1847	Kentucky	Democratic	1811–1862
Joseph John Martin	1879–1881	North Carolina	Republican	1833–1900
Joseph W. Martin Jr.	1925–1967	Massachusetts	Republican	1884–1968
Joshua L. Martin	1835–1839	Alabama	Democratic	1799–1856
Lewis J. Martin	1913	New Jersey	Democratic	1844–1913
Lynn M. Martin	1981–1991	Illinois	Republican	1939–present
Morgan Lewis Martin	1845–1847	Wisconsin	Democratic	1805–1887
Patrick M. Martin	1963–1965	California	Republican	1924–1968
Robert N. Martin	1825–1827	Maryland	National Republican	1798–1870
Thomas E. Martin	1939–1955	Iowa	Republican	1893–1971
Whitmell P. Martin	1915–1919	Louisiana	Progressive	1867–1929
Whitmell P. Martin	1919–1929	Louisiana	Democratic	1867–1929
William D. Martin	1827–1831	South Carolina	Democratic	1789–1833
William Harrison Martin	1887–1891	Texas	Democratic	1822–1898
Henry C. Martindale	1823–1831; 1833–1835	New York	National Republican	1780–1860
Matthew G. Martínez	1982–2000	California	Democratic	1929–2011
Matthew G. Martínez	2000–2001	California	Republican	1929–2011
Bill Martini	1995–1997	New Jersey	Republican	1947–present
Dudley Marvin	1823-1829; 1847-1849	New York	Whig	1786–1856
Francis Marvin	1893–1895	New York	Republican	1828–1905
James M. Marvin	1863–1869	New York	Republican	1809–1901
Richard P. Marvin	1837–1841	New York	Whig	1803–1892
Frank Mascara	1995–2003	Pennsylvania	Democratic	1930–2011
Harry H. Mason	1935–1937	Illinois	Democratic	1873–1946
James Brown Mason	1815–1819	Rhode Island	Federalist	1775–1819
James M. Mason	1837–1839	Virginia	Democratic	1798–1871
John Calvin Mason	1849–1853; 1857–1859	Kentucky	Democratic	1802–1865
John Thomson Mason Jr.	1841–1843	Maryland	Democratic	1815–1873
John Y. Mason	1831–1837	Virginia	Democratic	1799–1859
Jonathan Mason	1817–1820	Massachusetts	Federalist	1756–1831
Joseph Mason	1879–1883	New York	Republican	1828–1914
Moses Mason Jr.	1833–1837	Maine	Democratic	1789–1866
Noah M. Mason	1937–1963	Illinois	Republican	1882–1965
Samson Mason	1835–1843	Ohio	Whig	1793–1869
William Mason	1835–1837	New York	Democratic	1786–1860
William E. Mason	1887–1891; 1917–1921	Illinois	Republican	1850–1921
Eric Massa	2009–2010	New York	Democratic	1959–present
Zachary D. Massey	1910–1911	Tennessee	Republican	1864–1923
Sam C. Massingale	1935–1941	Oklahoma	Democratic	1870–1941
Josiah Masters	1805–1809	New York	Democratic–Republican	1763–1822
Jim Matheson	2001–2015	Utah	Democratic	1960–present
Frank A. Mathews Jr.	1945–1949	New Jersey	Republican	1890–1964
George A. Mathews	1889	Dakota	Republican	1852–1941
George Mathews	1789–1791	Georgia	Anti-Administration	1739–1812
James Mathews	1841–1845	Ohio	Democratic	1805–1887
Vincent Mathews	1809–1811	New York	Federalist	1766–1846
Bob Mathias	1967–1975	California	Republican	1930–2006
Charles Mathias	1961–1969	Maryland	Republican	1922–2010
Joshua Mathiot	1841–1843	Ohio	Whig	1800–1849
Dawson Mathis	1971–1981	Georgia	Democratic	1940–2017
James Matlack	1821–1825	New Jersey	Democratic-Republican	1775–1840
Aaron Matson	1821–1825	New Hampshire	Democratic-Republican	1770–1855
Courtland C. Matson	1881–1889	Indiana	Democratic	1841–1915
Bob Matsui	1979–2005	California	Democratic	1941–2005
Spark Matsunaga	1963–1977	Hawaii	Democratic	1916–1990
Orsamus B. Matteson	1853–1857	New York	Whig	1805–1889
Charles Matthews	1911–1913	Pennsylvania	Republican	1856–1932
D. R. Matthews	1953–1967	Florida	Democratic	1907–1997
Nelson E. Matthews	1915–1917	Ohio	Republican	1852–1917
William Matthews	1797–1799	Maryland	Federalist	1755–1808
John Mattocks	1821–1823	Vermont	Democratic-Republican	1777–1847
John Mattocks	1825–1827	Vermont	National Republican	1777–1847
John Mattocks	1841–1843	Vermont	Whig	1777–1847
Ebenezer Mattoon	1801–1803	Massachusetts	Federalist	1755–1843
Jim Mattox	1977–1983	Texas	Democratic	1943–2008
James Maurice	1853–1855	New York	Democratic	1814–1884
Abram Poindexter Maury	1835–1837	Tennessee	National Republican	1801–1848
Abram Poindexter Maury	1837–1839	Tennessee	Whig	1801–1848
Maury Maverick	1935–1939	Texas	Democratic	1895–1954
Nicholas Mavroules	1979–1993	Massachusetts	Democratic	1929–2003
Augustus Maxwell	1853–1857	Florida	Democratic	1820–1903
George C. Maxwell	1811–1813	New Jersey	Democratic-Republican	1771–1816
John Patterson Bryan Maxwell	1837–1839; 1841–1843	New Jersey	Whig	1804–1845
Lewis Maxwell	1827–1833	Virginia	National Republican	1790–1862
Samuel Maxwell	1897–1899	Nebraska	Populist	1825–1901
Thomas Maxwell	1829–1831	New York	Democratic	1792–1864
Andrew J. May	1931–1947	Kentucky	Democratic	1875–1959
Catherine Dean May	1959–1971	Washington	Republican	1914–2004
Edwin H. May Jr.	1957–1959	Connecticut	Republican	1924–2002
Henry May	1853–1855	Maryland	Democratic	1816–1866
Henry May	1861–1863	Maryland	Unionist	1816–1866
Mitchell May	1898-1901	New York	Democratic	1870–1961
William L. May	1834–1839	Illinois	Democratic	c. 1793–1849
Samuel Mayall	1853–1855	Maine	Democratic	1816–1892
William C. Maybury	1883–1887	Michigan	Democratic	1848–1909
Stephen L. Mayham	1869–1871; 1877–1879	New York	Democratic	1826–1908
Harry L. Maynard	1901–1911	Virginia	Democratic	1861–1922
Horace Maynard	1857–1859	Tennessee	American	1814–1882
Horace Maynard	1859–1861	Tennessee	Oppositionist	1814–1882
Horace Maynard	1861–1863	Tennessee	Unionist	1814–1882
Horace Maynard	1866–1867	Tennessee	Unconditional Unionist	1814–1882
Horace Maynard	1867–1875	Tennessee	Republican	1814–1882
John Maynard	1827–1829; 1838–1843	New York	National Republican	1786–1850
Wiley Mayne	1967–1975	Iowa	Republican	1917–2007
Robert Murphy Mayo	1883–1884	Virginia	Readjuster	1836–1896
Stephanie Murphy	2017–2023	Florida	Democratic	1978–present
William Mayrant	1815–1816	South Carolina	Democratic-Republican	1765–1832
Dannite H. Mays	1909–1913	Florida	Democratic	1852-1930
James Henry Mays	1915–1921	Utah	Democratic	1868-1926
Romano Mazzoli	1971–1995	Kentucky	Democratic	1932–2022
Ben McAdams	2019–2021	Utah	Democratic	1974–present
William McAdoo	1883–1891	New Jersey	Democratic	1853–1930
William McAleer	1891–1895; 1897–1901	Pennsylvania	Democratic	1838–1912
Archibald McAllister	1863-1865	Pennsylvania	Democratic	1813–1883
Vance McAllister	2013–2015	Louisiana	Republican	1974–present
James McAndrews	1901–1905; 1913–1921; 1935–1941	Illinois	Democratic	1862–1942
Joseph A. McArdle	1939-1942	Pennsylvania	Democratic	1903–1967
Clifton N. McArthur	1915–1923	Oregon	Republican	1879–1923
Duncan McArthur	1823–1825	Ohio	National Republican	1772–1839
John R. McBride	1863–1865	Oregon	Republican	1832–1904
Archibald McBryde	1809–1813	North Carolina	Federalist	1766–1836
John McCain	1983–1987	Arizona	Republican	1936–2018
John E. McCall	1895–1897	Tennessee	Republican	1859–1920
Samuel W. McCall	1893–1913	Massachusetts	Republican	1851–1923
Al McCandless	1983–1995	California	Republican	1927–2017
Lincoln L. McCandless	1933–1935	Hawaii	Democratic	1859–1940
Carolyn McCarthy	1997–2015	New York	Democratic	1944–2025
Dennis McCarthy	1867–1871	New York	Republican	1814–1886
Eugene McCarthy	1949–1959	Minnesota	Democratic-Farmer-Labor	1916–2005
John H. McCarthy	1889–1891	New York	Democratic	1850–1908
John McCarthy	1903–1907	Nebraska	Republican	1857–1943
Karen McCarthy	1995–2005	Missouri	Democratic	1947–2010
Kevin McCarthy	2007–2023	California	Republican	1965–present
Richard D. McCarthy	1965–1971	New York	Democratic	1927–1995
Andrew Z. McCarty	1855–1857	New York	Whig	1808–1879
Johnathan McCarty	1831–1835	Indiana	Democratic	1795–1852
Johnathan McCarty	1835–1837	Indiana	National Republican	1795–1852
Richard McCarty	1821–1823	New York	Democratic-Republican	1780–1844
William M. McCarty	1840–1841	Virginia	Whig	c. 1789–1863
William C. McCauslen	1843–1845	Ohio	Democratic	1796–1863
Charles W. McClammy	1887–1891	North Carolina	Democratic	1839–1896
Moses McClean	1845–1847	Pennsylvania	Democratic	1804–1870
James McCleary	1893–1907	Minnesota	Republican	1853–1924
James McCleery	1871	Louisiana	Republican	1837–1871
Abraham McClellan	1837–1843	Tennessee	Democratic	1789–1866
Charles A. O. McClellan	1889–1893	Indiana	Democratic	1835–1898
George McClellan	1913–1915	New York	Democratic	1856–1927
George B. McClellan Jr.	1895–1903	New York	Democratic	1865–1940
John L. McClellan	1935–1939	Arkansas	Democratic	1896–1977
Robert McClellan	1837–1839; 1841–1843	New York	Democratic	1806–1860
Robert McClelland	1843–1849	Michigan	Democratic	1807–1880
William McClelland	1871–1873	Pennsylvania	Democratic	1842–1892
Blair McClenachan	1797–1799	Pennsylvania	Democratic-Republican	17??–1812
John A. McClernand	1843–1851	Illinois	Democratic	1812–1900
James V. McClintic	1915–1935	Oklahoma	Democratic	1878–1948
Charles B. McClintock	1929–1933	Ohio	Republican	1886–1965
Robert McClory	1963–1983	Illinois	Republican	1908–1988
Augustus McCloskey	1929–1930	Texas	Democratic	1878–1950
Frank McCloskey	1983–1995	Indiana	Democratic	1939–2003
Pete McCloskey	1967–1983	California	Republican	1927–2024
Addison S. McClure	1881–1883; 1895–1897	Ohio	Republican	1839–1903
Charles McClure	1837-1839; 1840-1841	Pennsylvania	Democratic	1804–1846
James A. McClure	1967–1973	Idaho	Republican	1924–2011
Joseph W. McClurg	1863–1865	Missouri	Unconditional Unionist	1818–1900
Joseph W. McClurg	1865–1868	Missouri	Republican	1818–1900
Moses A. McCoid	1879–1885	Iowa	Republican	1840–1904
John Y. McCollister	1971–1977	Nebraska	Republican	1921–2013
Bill McCollum	1981–2001	Florida	Republican	1944–present
Louis E. McComas	1883–1891	Maryland	Republican	1846–1907
William McComas	1833–1835	Virginia	Democratic	1795–1865
William McComas	1835–1837	Virginia	National Republican	1795–1865
Felix G. McConnell	1843–1846	Alabama	Democratic	1809–1846
Samuel K. McConnell Jr.	1944–1957	Pennsylvania	Republican	1901–1985
Anson G. McCook	1877–1883	New York	Republican	1835–1917
Andrew McCord	1803–1805	New York	Democratic–Republican	c. 1754–1808
Jim Nance McCord	1943–1945	Tennessee	Democratic	1879–1968
Myron H. McCord	1889–1891	Wisconsin	Republican	1840–1908
Joseph W. McCorkle	1851–1853	California	Democratic	1819–1884
Paul G. McCorkle	1917	South Carolina	Democratic	1863–1934
John W. McCormack	1928–1971	Massachusetts	Democratic	1891–1980
Mike McCormack	1971–1981	Washington	Democratic	1921–2020
Henry C. McCormick	1887–1891	Pennsylvania	Republican	1844–1902
James R. McCormick	1867–1873	Missouri	Democratic	1824–1897
John W. McCormick	1883–1885	Ohio	Republican	1831–1917
Medill McCormick	1917–1919	Illinois	Republican	1877–1925
Nelson B. McCormick	1897–1899	Kansas	Populist	1847–1914
Richard C. McCormick	1869–1875; 1895–1897	Arizona; New York	Republican	1832–1901
Ruth Hanna McCormick	1929–1931	Illinois	Republican	1880–1944
Washington J. McCormick	1921–1923	Montana	Republican	1884–1949
Thaddeus McCotter	2003–2012	Michigan	Republican	1965–present
Edward Oscar McCowen	1943–1949	Ohio	Republican	1877–1953
Robert McCoy	1831–1833	Pennsylvania	Democratic	????–1849
Walter I. McCoy	1911–1914	New Jersey	Democratic	1859–1933
William McCoy	1811–1825	Virginia	Democratic-Republican	1???–1864
William McCoy	1825–1833	Virginia	Democratic	1???–1864
Robert M. McCracken	1915–1917	Idaho	Republican	1874–1934
George W. McCrary	1869–1877	Iowa	Republican	1835–1890
John D. McCrate	1845–1847	Maine	Democratic	1802–1879
George D. McCreary	1903–1913	Pennsylvania	Republican	1846–1915
James B. McCreary	1885–1897	Kentucky	Democratic	1838–1918
John McCreary	1819–1821	South Carolina	Democratic-Republican	c. 1761-1833
William Wallace McCredie	1909–1911	Washington	Republican	1862–1935
William McCreery	1803–1809	Maryland	Democratic-Republican	1750–1814
William McCreery	1829–1831	Pennsylvania	Democratic	1786–1841
Jim McCrery	1988–2009	Louisiana	Republican	1949–present
George McCulloch	1839–1841	Pennsylvania	Democratic	1792–1861
John McCulloch	1853–1855	Pennsylvania	Whig	1806–1879
Philip D. McCulloch Jr.	1893–1903	Arkansas	Democratic	1851–1928
Roscoe C. McCulloch	1915–1921	Ohio	Republican	1880–1958
William Moore McCulloch	1947–1973	Ohio	Republican	1901–1980
Welty McCullogh	1887–1889	Pennsylvania	Republican	1847–1889
Hiram McCullough	1865–1869	Maryland	Democratic	1813–1885
Thomas G. McCullough	1820–1821	Pennsylvania	Federalist	1785–1848
Dave McCurdy	1981–1995	Oklahoma	Democratic	1950–present
Joseph M. McDade	1963–1999	Pennsylvania	Republican	1931–2017
William McDaniel	1846–1847	Missouri	Democratic	1801–1866
John James McDannold	1893–1895	Illinois	Democratic	1851–1904
James C. McDearmon	1893–1897	Tennessee	Democratic	1844–1902
Allan L. McDermott	1900–1907	New Jersey	Democratic	1854–1908
James T. McDermott	1907–1917	Illinois	Democratic	1872–1938
Jim McDermott	1989–2017	Washington	Democratic	1936–2026
Alexander S. McDill	1873–1875	Wisconsin	Republican	1822–1875
James W. McDill	1873–1877	Iowa	Republican	1834–1894
Edward F. McDonald	1891–1892	New Jersey	Democratic	1844–1892
Jack H. McDonald	1967–1973	Michigan	Republican	1932–2022
John McDonald	1897–1899	Maryland	Republican	1837–1917
Joseph E. McDonald	1849–1851	Indiana	Democratic	1819–1891
Larry McDonald	1975–1983	Georgia	Democratic	1935–1983
Gordon L. McDonough	1945–1963	California	Republican	1895–1968
James A. McDougall	1853–1855	California	Democratic	1817–1867
Alexander McDowell	1893–1895	Pennsylvania	Republican	1845–1913
Harris McDowell	1955–1957; 1959–1967	Delaware	Democratic	1906–1988
James McDowell	1846–1851	Virginia	Democratic	1795–1851
James F. McDowell	1863–1865	Indiana	Democratic	1825–1887
John McDowell	1939–1941; 1947–1949	Pennsylvania	Republican	1902–1957
John A. McDowell	1897–1901	Ohio	Democratic	1853–1927
Joseph "Pleasant Gardens" McDowell	1793–1795	North Carolina	Anti-Administration	1758–1799
Joseph McDowell Jr.	1797–1799	North Carolina	Democratic-Republican	1756–1801
Joseph J. McDowell	1843–1847	Ohio	Democratic	1800–1877
George McDuffie	1821–1825	South Carolina	Democratic-Republican	1790–1851
George McDuffie	1825–1831	South Carolina	Democratic	1790–1851
George McDuffie	1831–1834	South Carolina	Nullifier	1790–1851
J. V. McDuffie	1890–1891	Alabama	Republican	1841–1896
John McDuffie	1919–1935	Alabama	Democratic	1883–1950
Donald McEachin	2017–2022	Virginia	Democratic	1961–2022
Michael J. McEttrick	1893–1895	Massachusetts	Independent Democrat	1848–1921
Thomas McEwan Jr.	1895–1899	New Jersey	Republican	1854–1926
Bob McEwen	1981–1993	Ohio	Republican	1950–present
Robert C. McEwen	1965–1981	New York	Republican	1920–1997
Louis T. McFadden	1915–1935	Pennsylvania	Republican	1876–1936
Obadiah B. McFadden	1873–1875	Washington	Democratic	1815–1875
John J. McFall	1957–1978	California	Democratic	1918–2006
Duncan McFarlan	1805–1807	North Carolina	Democratic-Republican	????–1816
William McFarland	1875–1877	Tennessee	Democratic	1821–1900
William D. McFarlane	1933–1939	Texas	Democratic	1894–1980
Lawrence E. McGann	1891–1895	Illinois	Democratic	1852–1928
Robert N. McGarvey	1947–1949	Pennsylvania	Republican	1888–1952
Edward W. McGaughey	1845–1847; 1849–1851	Indiana	Whig	1817–1852
Charles McGavin	1905–1909	Illinois	Republican	1874–1940
Dan R. McGehee	1935–1947	Mississippi	Democratic	1883–1962
Daniel J. McGillicuddy	1911–1917	Maine	Democratic	1859–1936
Donald McGinley	1959–1961	Nebraska	Democratic	1920–2005
Cornelius Augustine McGlennon	1919–1921	New Jersey	Democratic	1878–1931
Herbert J. McGlinchey	1945–1947	Pennsylvania	Democratic	1904–1992
George McGovern	1957–1961	South Dakota	Democratic	1922–2012
Jonas H. McGowan	1877–1881	Michigan	Republican	1837–1909
James P. McGranery	1937–1943	Pennsylvania	Democratic	1895–1962
Christopher C. McGrath	1949-1953	New York	Democratic	1902–1986
John J. McGrath	1933–1939	California	Democratic	1872–1951
Raymond J. McGrath	1981–1993	New York	Republican	1942–present
Thomas C. McGrath Jr.	1965–1967	New Jersey	Democratic	1927–1994
J. Harry McGregor	1940–1958	Ohio	Republican	1896–1958
James McGrew	1869–1873	West Virginia	Republican	1813–1910
John S. McGroarty	1935–1939	California	Democratic	1862–1944
Harold C. McGugin	1931–1935	Kansas	Republican	1893–1946
Bird S. McGuire	1903–1907; 1907–1915	Oklahoma	Republican	1865–1930
John A. McGuire	1949–1953	Connecticut	Democratic	1906–1976
Paul McHale	1993–1999	Pennsylvania	Democratic	1950–present
Robert L. McHatton	1826–1829	Kentucky	Democratic	1788–1835
Henry D. McHenry	1871–1873	Kentucky	Democratic	1826–1890
John Geiser McHenry	1907–1912	Pennsylvania	Democratic	1868–1912
John H. McHenry	1845–1847	Kentucky	Whig	1797–1871
Patrick McHenry	2005–2025	North Carolina	Republican	1975–present
John M. McHugh	1993–2009	New York	Republican	1948–present
Matthew F. McHugh	1975–1993	New York	Democratic	1938–present
Abraham Robinson McIlvaine	1843–1849	Pennsylvania	Whig	1804–1863
Walter D. McIndoe	1863–1867	Wisconsin	Republican	1819–1872
Scott McInnis	1993–2005	Colorado	Republican	1953–present
Clifford McIntire	1951–1965	Maine	Republican	1908–1974
Rufus McIntire	1827–1835	Maine	Democratic	1784–1866
William W. McIntire	1897–1899	Maryland	Republican	1850–1912
David McIntosh	1995–2001	Indiana	Republican	1958–present
Robert J. McIntosh	1957–1959	Michigan	Republican	1922–2008
John J. McIntyre	1941–1943	Wyoming	Democratic	1904–1974
Mike McIntyre	1997–2015	North Carolina	Democratic	1956–present
Ebenezer McJunkin	1871–1875	Pennsylvania	Republican	1819–1907
William McMahon McKaig	1891–1895	Maryland	Democratic	1845-1907
James I McKay	1831–1849	North Carolina	Democratic	1793–1853
K. Gunn McKay	1971–1981	Utah	Democratic	1925–2000
James B. McKean	1859–1863	New York	Republican	1821–1879
Samuel McKean	1823–1825	Pennsylvania	Democratic-Republican	1787–1841
Samuel McKean	1825–1829	Pennsylvania	Democratic	1787–1841
George C. McKee	1869–1875	Mississippi	Republican	1837–1890
John McKee	1823–1825	Alabama	Democratic-Republican	1771–1832
John McKee	1825–1829	Alabama	Democratic	1771–1832
Samuel McKee	1809–1817	Kentucky	Democratic-Republican	1774–1826
Samuel McKee	1865–1867	Kentucky	Unconditional Unionist	1833–1898
Samuel McKee	1868–1869	Kentucky	Republican	1833–1898
William A. McKeighan	1891–1895	Nebraska	Populist	1842–1895
Kenneth McKellar	1911–1917	Tennessee	Democratic	1869–1957
Joseph McKenna	1885–1892	California	Republican	1843–1926
Thomas McKean Thompson McKennan	1831–1839	Pennsylvania	Anti-Masonic	1794–1852
Thomas McKean Thompson McKennan	1842–1843	Pennsylvania	Whig	1794–1852
William R. McKenney	1895–1896	Virginia	Democratic	1851–1916
Jacob Kerlin McKenty	1860–1861	Pennsylvania	Democratic	1827–1866
Charles E. McKenzie	1943–1947	Louisiana	Democratic	1896–1956
James A. McKenzie	1877–1883	Kentucky	Democratic	1840–1904
John C. McKenzie	1911–1925	Illinois	Republican	1860–1941
Lewis McKenzie	1863	Virginia	Unionist	1810–1895
Lewis McKenzie	1870–1871	Virginia	Conservative	1810–1895
Buck McKeon	1993–2015	California	Republican	1938–present
John McKeon	1835–1837; 1841–1843	New York	Democratic	1808–1883
Raymond S. McKeough	1935–1943	Illinois	Democratic	1888–1979
Tom D. McKeown	1917–1921; 1923–1935	Oklahoma	Democratic	1878–1951
John R. McKernan Jr.	1983–1987	Maine	Republican	1948–present
Mike McKevitt	1971–1973	Colorado	Republican	1928–2000
Joseph C. McKibbin	1857–1859	California	Democratic	1824–1896
Alexander McKim	1809–1815	Maryland	Democratic-Republican	1748–1832
Isaac McKim	1823–1825	Maryland	Democratic-Republican	1775–1838
Isaac McKim	1833–1838	Maryland	Democratic	1775–1838
Richard F. McKiniry	1919–1921	New York	Democratic	1878–1950
Duncan E. McKinlay	1905–1911	California	Republican	1862–1914
David McKinley	2011–2023	West Virginia	Republican	1947–2026
John McKinley	1833–1835	Alabama	Democratic	1780–1852
William McKinley	1810–1811	Virginia	Democratic-Republican	N/A
William McKinley	1877–1884; 1885–1891	Ohio	Republican	1843–1901
William B. McKinley	1905–1913; 1915–1921	Illinois	Republican	1856–1926
Cynthia McKinney	1993–2003; 2005–2007	Georgia	Democratic	1955–present
James McKinney	1905–1913	Illinois	Republican	1852–1934
John F. McKinney	1863–1865; 1871–1873	Ohio	Democratic	1827–1903
Luther F. McKinney	1887–1889; 1891–1893	New Hampshire	Democratic	1841–1922
Stewart McKinney	1971–1987	Connecticut	Republican	1931–1987
Clinton D. McKinnon	1949–1953	California	Democratic	1906–2001
Thomas McKissock	1849–1851	New York	Whig	1790–1866
Martin B. McKneally	1969–1971	New York	Republican	1914–1992
Robert McKnight	1859–1863	Pennsylvania	Republican	1820–1885
James McLachlan	1895–1897; 1901–1911	California	Republican	1852–1940
Frank A. McLain	1898–1909	Mississippi	Democratic	1852–1920
James X. McLanahan	1849–1853	Pennsylvania	Democratic	1809–1861
Louis McLane	1817–1825	Delaware	Federalist	1786–1857
Louis McLane	1825–1827	Delaware	Democratic	1786–1857
Patrick McLane	1919–1921	Pennsylvania	Democratic	1875–1946
Robert Milligan McLane	1847–1851; 1879–1883	Maryland	Democratic	1815–1898
Charles F. McLaughlin	1935–1943	Nebraska	Democratic	1887–1976
James C. McLaughlin	1907–1932	Michigan	Republican	1858–1932
Joseph McLaughlin	1917–1919; 1921–1923	Pennsylvania	Republican	1867–1926
Melvin O. McLaughlin	1919–1927	Nebraska	Republican	1876–1928
John L. McLaurin	1892–1897	South Carolina	Democratic	1860–1934
Alney McLean	1815–1817; 1819–1821	Kentucky	Democratic-Republican	1779–1841
Donald H. McLean	1933–1945	New Jersey	Republican	1884–1975
Finis McLean	1849–1851	Kentucky	Whig	1806–1881
James Henry McLean	1882–1883	Missouri	Republican	1829–1886
John McLean	1813–1816	Ohio	Democratic-Republican	1785–1861
John McLean	1818–1819	Illinois	None	1791–1830
Samuel McLean	1865–1867	Montana	None	1826–1877
William McLean	1823–1829	Ohio	National Republican	1794–1839
William P. McLean	1873–1875	Texas	Democratic	1836–1925
A. Jeff McLemore	1915–1919	Texas	Democratic	1857–1929
Jeremiah McLene	1833–1837	Ohio	Democratic	1767–1837
Clarence J. McLeod	1920–1921; 1923–1937; 1939–1941	Michigan	Republican	1895–1959
Robert T. McLoskey	1963–1965	Illinois	Republican	1907–1990
Gregory McMahon	1947-1949	New York	Republican	1915–1989
John A. McMahon	1875–1881	Ohio	Democratic	1833–1923
Michael McMahon	2009–2011	New York	Democratic	1957–present
William McManus	1825–1827	New York	National Republican	1780–1835
Alex McMillan	1985–1995	North Carolina	Republican	1932–2024
Alexander McMillan	1817	North Carolina	Federalist	????-1817
Clara G. McMillan	1939–1941	South Carolina	Democratic	1894–1976
John L. McMillan	1939–1973	South Carolina	Democratic	1898–1979
Samuel McMillan	1907-1909	New York	Republican	1850–1924
Thomas S. McMillan	1925–1939	South Carolina	Democratic	1888–1939
William McMillan	1800–1801	Northwest	None	1764–1804
Rolla C. McMillen	1944–1951	Illinois	Republican	1880–1961
Tom McMillen	1987–1993	Maryland	Democratic	1952–present
Benton McMillin	1879–1899	Tennessee	Democratic	1845–1933
Henry McMorran	1903–1913	Michigan	Republican	1844–1929
Cathy McMorris Rodgers	2005–2025	Washington	Republican	1969–present
Chester B. McMullen	1951–1953	Florida	Democratic	1902–1953
Fayette McMullen	1849–1857	Virginia	Democratic	1805–1880
Howard J. McMurray	1943–1945	Wisconsin	Democratic	1901–1961
William F. McNagny	1893–1895	Indiana	Democratic	1850–1923
John McNair	1851–1855	Pennsylvania	Democratic	1800–1861
William S. McNary	1903–1907	Massachusetts	Democratic	1863–1930
Thompson W. McNeely	1869–1873	Illinois	Democratic	1835–1921
Archibald McNeill	1821–1823	North Carolina	Federalist	????–1849
Archibald McNeill	1825–1827	North Carolina	Democratic	????–1849
Jerry McNerney	2007–2023	California	Democratic	1951–present
John McNulta	1873–1875	Illinois	Republican	1837–1900
Frank Joseph McNulty	1923–1925	New Jersey	Democratic	1872–1926
James F. McNulty Jr.	1983–1985	Arizona	Democratic	1925–2009
Michael McNulty	1989–2009	New York	Democratic	1947–present
Edward McPherson	1859–1863	Pennsylvania	Republican	1830–1895
Isaac V. McPherson	1919–1923	Missouri	Republican	1868–1931
Smith McPherson	1899–1900	Iowa	Republican	1848–1915
John McQueen	1849–1860	South Carolina	Democratic	1804–1867
John J. McRae	1858–1861	Mississippi	Democratic	1815–1868
Thomas C. McRae	1885–1903	Arkansas	Democratic	1851–1929
Samuel Davis McReynolds	1923–1939	Tennessee	Democratic	1872–1939
Donald C. McRuer	1865–1867	California	Republican	1826–1898
Martha McSally	2015–2019	Arizona	Republican	1966–present
John A. McShane	1887–1889	Nebraska	Democratic	1850–1923
James McSherry	1821–1823	Pennsylvania	Federalist	1776–1849
Clem McSpadden	1973–1975	Oklahoma	Democratic	1925–2008
John J. McSwain	1921–1936	South Carolina	Democratic	1875–1936
Harold B. McSween	1959–1963	Louisiana	Democratic	1926–2002
John McSweeney	1923–1929; 1937–1939; 1949–1951	Ohio	Democratic	1890–1969
Charles McVean	1833–1835	New York	Democratic	1802–1848
Walter Lewis McVey Jr.	1961–1963	Kansas	Republican	1922–2014
William E. McVey	1951–1958	Illinois	Republican	1885–1958
Roy H. McVicker	1965–1967	Colorado	Democratic	1924–1973
John D. McWilliams	1943–1945	Connecticut	Republican	1891–1975
William McWillie	1849–1851	Mississippi	Democratic	1795–1869
James Meacham	1849–1855	Vermont	Whig	1810–1856
James Meacham	1855–1856	Vermont	Oppositionist	1810–1856
Cowles Mead	1805	Georgia	Democratic-Republican	1776–1844
James M. Mead	1919-1938	New York	Democratic	1885–1964
Edwin R. Meade	1875–1877	New York	Democratic	1836–1889
Hugh Meade	1947–1949	Maryland	Democratic	1907–1949
Richard Kidder Meade	1847–1853	Virginia	Democratic	1803–1862
Wendell H. Meade	1947–1949	Kentucky	Republican	1912–1986
George Meader	1951–1965	Michigan	Republican	1907–1994
Mark Meadows	2013–2020	North Carolina	Republican	1959–present
Alexander Mebane	1793–1795	North Carolina	Anti-Administration	1744–1795
William Medill	1839–1843	Ohio	Democratic	1802–1865
Ezra Meech	1819–1821	Vermont	Democratic-Republican	1773–1856
Ezra Meech	1825–1827	Vermont	Democratic	1773–1856
Lloyd Meeds	1965–1979	Washington	Democratic	1927–2005
Marty Meehan	1993–2007	Massachusetts	Democratic	1956–present
Pat Meehan	2011–2018	Pennsylvania	Republican	1955–present
Carrie P. Meek	1993–2003	Florida	Democratic	1926–2021
Kendrick Meek	2003–2011	Florida	Democratic	1966–present
Jacob Edwin Meeker	1915–1918	Missouri	Republican	1878–1918
David Meekison	1897–1901	Ohio	Democratic	1849–1915
James A. Meeks	1933–1939	Illinois	Democratic	1864–1946
Henry Meigs	1819–1821	New York	Democratic-Republican	1782–1861
Peter Meijer	2021–2023	Michigan	Republican	1988–present
George de Rue Meiklejohn	1893–1897	Nebraska	Republican	1857–1929
Charlie Melançon	2005–2011	Louisiana	Democratic	1947–present
John Melcher	1969–1977	Montana	Democratic	1924–2018
David B. Mellish	1873–1874	New York	Republican	1831–1874
Richard Menefee	1837–1839	Kentucky	Whig	1809–1841
Bob Menendez	1993–2006	New Jersey	Democratic	1954–present
Franklin Menges	1925–1931	Pennsylvania	Republican	1858–1956
John W. Menzies	1861–1863	Kentucky	Unionist	1819–1897
Charles F. Mercer	1817–1823	Virginia	Federalist	1778–1858
Charles F. Mercer	1823–1825	Virginia	Democratic-Republican	1778–1858
Charles F. Mercer	1825–1837	Virginia	National Republican	1778–1858
Charles F. Mercer	1837–1839	Virginia	Whig	1778–1858
David Henry Mercer	1893–1903	Nebraska	Republican	1857–1919
John Francis Mercer	1792–1794	Maryland	Anti-Administration	1759–1821
Ulysses Mercur	1865-1872	Pennsylvania	Republican	1818–1887
Elisha E. Meredith	1891–1897	Virginia	Democratic	1848–1900
David Meriwether	1802–1807	Georgia	Democratic-Republican	1755–1822
James Meriwether	1825–1827	Georgia	Democratic	1789–1854
James Archibald Meriwether	1841–1843	Georgia	Whig	1806–1852
Clinton L. Merriam	1871–1875	New York	Republican	1824–1900
William Matthews Merrick	1871–1873	Maryland	Democratic	1818–1889
D. Bailey Merrill	1953–1955	Indiana	Republican	1912–1993
Orsamus Cook Merrill	1817–1820	Vermont	Democratic-Republican	1775–1865
Truman A. Merriman	1885–1889	New York	Democratic	1839–1892
Edwin A. Merritt	1912–1914	New York	Republican	1860–1914
Matthew J. Merritt	1935–1945	New York	Democratic	1895–1946
Samuel A. Merritt	1871–1873	Idaho	Democratic	1827–1910
Schuyler Merritt	1917–1931; 1933–1937	Connecticut	Republican	1853–1953
Chester E. Merrow	1943–1963	New Hampshire	Republican	1906–1974
Orange Merwin	1825–1829	Connecticut	National Republican	1777–1853
William S. Mesick	1897–1901	Michigan	Republican	1856–1942
Thomas Meskill	1967–1971	Connecticut	Republican	1928–2007
Luke Messer	2013–2019	Indiana	Republican	1969–present
Arunah Metcalf	1811–1813	New York	Democratic–Republican	1771–1848
Jack Metcalf	1995–2001	Washington	Republican	1927–2007
Lee Metcalf	1953–1961	Montana	Democratic	1911–1978
Victor H. Metcalf	1899–1904	California	Republican	1853–1936
Henry B. Metcalfe	1875–1877	New York	Democratic	1805–1881
Lyne Metcalfe	1877–1879	Missouri	Republican	1822–1906
Ralph H. Metcalfe	1971–1978	Illinois	Democratic	1910–1978
Thomas Metcalfe	1819–1821	Kentucky	Federalist	1780–1855
Thomas Metcalfe	1821–1825	Kentucky	Democratic-Republican	1780–1855
Thomas Metcalfe	1825–1828	Kentucky	National Republican	1780–1855
Herman A. Metz	1913–1915	New York	Democratic	1867–1934
Adolph Meyer	1891–1908	Louisiana	Democratic	1842–1908
Herbert A. Meyer	1947–1950	Kansas	Republican	1886–1950
John Ambrose Meyer	1941–1943	Maryland	Democratic	1899–1969
William H. Meyer	1959–1961	Vermont	Democratic	1914–1983
Benjamin F. Meyers	1871-1873	Pennsylvania	Democratic	1833–1918
Jan Meyers	1985–1997	Kansas	Republican	1928–2019
Helen Stevenson Meyner	1975–1979	New Jersey	Democratic	1929–1997
Edward Mezvinsky	1973–1977	Iowa	Democratic	1937–present
Dan Mica	1979–1989	Florida	Democratic	1944–present
John Mica	1993–2017	Florida	Republican	1943–present
M. Alfred Michaelson	1921–1931	Illinois	Republican	1878–1949
Anthony Michalek	1905–1907	Illinois	Republican	1878–1916
Mike Michaud	2003–2015	Maine	Democratic	1955–present
Robert H. Michel	1957–1995	Illinois	Republican	1923–2017
Earl C. Michener	1919–1933; 1935–1951	Michigan	Republican	1876–1957
J. Ross Mickey	1901–1903	Illinois	Democratic	1856–1928
Ner Middleswarth	1853-1855	Pennsylvania	Whig	1783–1865
George Middleton	1863–1865	New Jersey	Democratic	1800–1888
Henry Middleton	1815–1819	South Carolina	Democratic-Republican	1770–1846
Robert W. Miers	1897–1905	Indiana	Democratic	1848–1930
Barbara Mikulski	1977–1987	Maryland	Democratic	1936–present
Abner Mikva	1969–1973; 1975–1979	Illinois	Democratic	1926–2016
Frederick Miles	1879–1883; 1889–1891	Connecticut	Republican	1815–1896
John E. Miles	1949–1951	New Mexico	Democratic	1884–1971
Joshua W. Miles	1895–1897	Maryland	Democratic	1858–1929
William Porcher Miles	1857–1860	South Carolina	Democratic	1822–1899
Dale Milford	1973–1979	Texas	Democratic	1926–1997
Charles D. Millard	1931-1937	New York	Republican	1873–1944
Stephen C. Millard	1885-1887	New York	Republican	1841–1914
John Milledge	1792–1793	Georgia	Anti-Administration	1757–1818
John Milledge	1795–1799; 1801–1802	Georgia	Democratic-Republican	1757–1818
John Millen	1843	Georgia	Democratic	1804–1843
Juanita Millender-McDonald	1996–2007	California	Democratic	1938–2007
Arthur L. Miller	1943–1959	Nebraska	Republican	1892–1967
Brad Miller	2003–2013	North Carolina	Democratic	1953–present
Candice Miller	2003–2017	Michigan	Republican	1954–present
Clarence B. Miller	1909–1919	Minnesota	Republican	1872–1922
Clarence E. Miller	1967–1993	Ohio	Republican	1917–2011
Clem Miller	1959–1962	California	Democratic	1916–1962
Dan Miller	1993–2003	Florida	Republican	1942–present
Daniel F. Miller	1850–1851	Iowa	Whig	1814–1895
Daniel H. Miller	1823–1825	Pennsylvania	Democratic-Republican	????–1846
Daniel H. Miller	1825–1831	Pennsylvania	Democratic	????–1846
Edward E. Miller	1923–1925	Illinois	Republican	1880–1946
Edward T. Miller	1947–1959	Maryland	Republican	1895–1968
Gary Miller	1999–2015	California	Republican	1948–present
George Funston Miller	1865–1869	Pennsylvania	Republican	1809–1885
George P. Miller	1945–1973	California	Democratic	1891–1982
George Miller	1975–2015	California	Democratic	1945–present
Howard Shultz Miller	1953–1955	Kansas	Democratic	1879–1970
James Francis Miller	1883–1887	Texas	Democratic	1830–1902
James Monroe Miller	1899–1911	Kansas	Republican	1852–1926
Jeff Miller	2001–2017	Florida	Republican	1959–present
Jesse Miller	1833-1836	Pennsylvania	Democratic	1800–1850
John Miller	1825–1827	New York	National Republican	1774–1862
John Miller	1837–1843	Missouri	Democratic	1781–1846
John E. Miller	1931–1937	Arkansas	Democratic	1888–1981
John Franklin Miller	1917–1931	Washington	Republican	1862–1936
John G. Miller	1851–1855	Missouri	Whig	1812–1856
John G. Miller	1855–1856	Missouri	Oppositionist	1812–1856
John K. Miller	1847–1851	Ohio	Democratic	1819–1863
John Miller	1985–1993	Washington	Republican	1938–2017
Joseph Miller	1857–1859	Ohio	Democratic	1819–1862
Killian Miller	1855–1857	New York	Whig	1785–1859
Louis E. Miller	1943–1945	Missouri	Republican	1899–1952
Lucas M. Miller	1891–1893	Wisconsin	Democratic	1824–1902
Morris S. Miller	1813–1815	New York	Federalist	1779–1824
Orrin L. Miller	1895–1897	Kansas	Republican	1856–1926
Pleasant Moorman Miller	1809–1811	Tennessee	Democratic-Republican	????–1849
Rutger B. Miller	1836–1837	New York	Democratic	1805–1877
Samuel F. Miller	1863-1865; 1875-1877	New York	Republican	1827–1892
Samuel H. Miller	1881-1885; 1915-1917	Pennsylvania	Republican	1840–1918
Smith Miller	1853–1857	Indiana	Democratic	1804–1872
Stephen Decatur Miller	1817–1819	South Carolina	Democratic-Republican	1787–1838
Thomas B. Miller	1942-1945	Pennsylvania	Republican	1896–1976
Thomas E. Miller	1890–1891	South Carolina	Republican	1849–1938
Thomas W. Miller	1915–1917	Delaware	Republican	1886–1973
Ward Miller	1960–1961	Ohio	Republican	1902–1984
Warner Miller	1879–1881	New York	Republican	1838–1918
Warren Miller	1895–1899	West Virginia	Republican	1847–1920
William E. Miller	1951–1965	New York	Republican	1914–1983
William H. Miller	1863–1865	Pennsylvania	Democratic	1829–1870
William J. Miller	1939–1941; 1943–1945; 1947–1949	Connecticut	Republican	1899–1950
William S. Miller	1845-1847	New York	American	1793–1854
Jacob L. Milligan	1920–1921; 1923–1935	Missouri	Democratic	1889–1951
John J. Milligan	1831–1839	Delaware	Whig	1795–1875
Charles W. Milliken	1873–1877	Kentucky	Democratic	1827–1915
Seth L. Milliken	1883–1897	Maine	Republican	1831–1897
William H. Milliken Jr.	1959-1965	Pennsylvania	Republican	1897–1969
Charles S. Millington	1909-1911	New York	Republican	1855–1913
Daniel W. Mills	1897–1899	Illinois	Republican	1838–1904
Elijah H. Mills	1815–1819	Massachusetts	Federalist	1776–1829
Newt V. Mills	1937–1943	Louisiana	Democratic	1899–1996
Ogden L. Mills	1921–1927	New York	Republican	1884–1937
Roger Q. Mills	1873–1892	Texas	Democratic	1832–1911
Wilbur Mills	1939–1977	Arkansas	Democratic	1909–1992
William Oswald Mills	1971–1973	Maryland	Republican	1924–1973
John S. Millson	1849–1861	Virginia	Democratic	1808–1874
Frank C. Millspaugh	1921–1922	Missouri	Republican	1872–1947
William Millward	1855–1857	Pennsylvania	Oppositionist	1822–1871
William Millward	1859–1861	Pennsylvania	Republican	1822–1871
Alfred Milnes	1895–1897	Michigan	Republican	1844–1916
William Milnes Jr.	1870–1871	Virginia	Conservative	1827–1889
James Milnor	1811–1813	Pennsylvania	Federalist	1773–1845
William Milnor	1807–1811; 1815–1817; 1819–1822	Pennsylvania	Federalist	1769–1848
Daniel F. Minahan	1919–1921; 1923–1925	New Jersey	Democratic	1877–1947
Ahiman Louis Miner	1851–1853	Vermont	Whig	1804–1886
Charles Miner	1825–1829	Pennsylvania	National Republican	1780–1865
Henry C. Miner	1895-1897	New York	Democratic	1842–1900
Phineas Miner	1834–1835	Connecticut	National Republican	1777–1839
Norman Mineta	1975–1995	California	Democratic	1931–2022
David Minge	1993–2001	Minnesota	Democratic-Farmer-Labor	1942–present
Joseph Minish	1963–1985	New Jersey	Democratic	1916–2007
Patsy Mink	1965–1977; 1990–2002	Hawaii	Democratic	1927–2002
Walt Minnick	2009–2011	Idaho	Democratic	1942–present
Edward S. Minor	1895–1907	Wisconsin	Republican	1840-1924
William Edwin Minshall Jr.	1955–1974	Ohio	Republican	1911-1990
Alexander Mitchell	1871–1875	Wisconsin	Democratic	1817-1887
Alexander C. Mitchell	1911	Kansas	Republican	1860-1911
Anderson Mitchell	1842–1843	North Carolina	Whig	1800-1876
Arthur Wergs Mitchell	1935–1943	Illinois	Democratic	1883-1968
Charles F. Mitchell	1837–1841	New York	Whig	1806–1865
Charles L. Mitchell	1883–1887	Connecticut	Democratic	1844–1890
Donald J. Mitchell	1973–1983	New York	Republican	1923–2003
E. A. Mitchell	1947–1949	Indiana	Republican	1910-1979
George Edward Mitchell	1823–1825	Maryland	Democratic-Republican	1781-1832
George Edward Mitchell	1825–1827; 1829–1832	Maryland	Democratic	1781-1832
Harlan Erwin Mitchell	1958–1961	Georgia	Democratic	1924–2011
Harry Mitchell	2007–2011	Arizona	Democratic	1940–2026
Henry Mitchell	1833–1835	New York	Democratic	1784–1856
Hugh Mitchell	1949–1953	Washington	Democratic	1907–1996
James Coffield Mitchell	1825–1829	Tennessee	Democratic	1786–1843
James S. Mitchell	1821–1823	Pennsylvania	Democratic-Republican	1784–1844
John Mitchell	1825-1829	Pennsylvania	Democratic	1781–1849
John I. Mitchell	1877-1881	Pennsylvania	Republican	1838–1907
John Joseph Mitchell	1910–1911; 1913–1915	Massachusetts	Democratic	1873–1925
John L. Mitchell	1891–1893	Wisconsin	Democratic	1842–1904
John M. Mitchell	1896-1899	New York	Republican	1858–1905
John Ridley Mitchell	1931–1939	Tennessee	Democratic	1877–1962
Nahum Mitchell	1803–1805	Massachusetts	Federalist	1769–1853
Parren Mitchell	1971–1987	Maryland	Democratic	1922–2007
Paul Mitchell	2017–2020	Michigan	Republican	1956–2021
Paul Mitchell	2020–2021	Michigan	Independent	1956–2021
Robert Mitchell	1833–1835	Ohio	Democratic	1778–1848
Thomas R. Mitchell	1821–1823	South Carolina	Democratic-Republican	1783–1837
Thomas R. Mitchell	1825–1829; 1831–1833	South Carolina	Democratic	1783–1837
William Mitchell	1861–1863	Indiana	Republican	1807–1865
Samuel L. Mitchill	1801-1804; 1810-1813	New York	Democratic–Republican	1764–1831
Chester L. Mize	1965–1971	Kansas	Republican	1917–1994
Wilmer Mizell	1969–1975	North Carolina	Republican	1930–1999
Joe Moakley	1973–2001	Massachusetts	Democratic	1927–2001
Carlton Mobley	1932–1933	Georgia	Democratic	1906–1981
Walter H. Moeller	1959–1963; 1965–1967	Ohio	Democratic	1910–1999
Seth C. Moffatt	1885–1887	Michigan	Republican	1841–1887
John Moffet	1869-1869	Pennsylvania	Democratic	1831–1884
Toby Moffett	1975–1983	Connecticut	Democratic	1944–present
Hosea Moffitt	1813–1817	New York	Federalist	1757–1825
John H. Moffitt	1887-1891	New York	Republican	1843-1926
Guy Molinari	1981–1989	New York	Republican	1928–2018
Susan Molinari	1990–1997	New York	Republican	1958–present
Marc Molinaro	2023–2025	New York	Republican	1975–present
Alan Mollohan	1983–2011	West Virginia	Democratic	1943–present
Bob Mollohan	1953–1957; 1969–1983	West Virginia	Democratic	1909–1999
Richard S. Molony	1851–1853	Illinois	Democratic	1811–1891
John S. Monagan	1959–1973	Connecticut	Democratic	1911–2005
Joseph P. Monaghan	1933–1937	Montana	Democratic	1906–1985
James G. Monahan	1919–1921	Wisconsin	Republican	1855–1923
Louis Monast	1927–1929	Rhode Island	Republican	1863–1936
Frank W. Mondell	1895–1897; 1899–1923	Wyoming	Republican	1860–1939
Robert Monell	1819–1821; 1829–1831	New York	Democratic-Republican	1786–1860
Hernando Money	1875–1885; 1893–1897	Mississippi	Democratic	1839–1912
B. J. Monkiewicz	1939–1941; 1943–1945	Connecticut	Republican	1898–1971
James Monroe	1839-1841	New York	Whig	1799–1870
James Monroe	1871–1881	Ohio	Republican	1821–1898
Mike Monroney	1939–1951	Oklahoma	Democratic	1902–1980
David Smith Monson	1985–1987	Utah	Republican	1945–present
Andrew J. Montague	1913–1937	Virginia	Democratic	1862–1937
Numa F. Montet	1929–1937	Louisiana	Democratic	1892–1985
Alexander B. Montgomery	1887–1895	Kentucky	Democratic	1837–1910
Daniel Montgomery Jr.	1807–1809	Pennsylvania	Democratic-Republican	1765–1831
John Montgomery	1807–1811	Maryland	Democratic-Republican	1764–1828
John Gallagher Montgomery	1857	Pennsylvania	Democratic	1805–1857
Samuel J. Montgomery	1925–1927	Oklahoma	Republican	1896–1957
Sonny Montgomery	1967–1997	Mississippi	Democratic	1920–2006
Thomas Montgomery	1813–1815; 1820–1823	Kentucky	Democratic-Republican	1779–1828
William Montgomery	1793–1795	Pennsylvania	Anti-Administration	1736–1816
William Montgomery	1835–1841	North Carolina	Democratic	1789–1844
William Montgomery	1857–1861	Pennsylvania	Democratic	1818–1870
Joseph Montoya	1957–1964	New Mexico	Democratic	1915–1978
Néstor Montoya	1921–1923	New Mexico	Republican	1862–1923
James M. Moody	1901–1903	North Carolina	Republican	1858–1903
Jim Moody	1983–1993	Wisconsin	Democratic	1935–2019
Malcolm A. Moody	1899–1903	Oregon	Republican	1854–1925
William Henry Moody	1895–1902	Massachusetts	Republican	1853-1917
John A. Moon	1897–1921	Tennessee	Democratic	1855–1921
John W. Moon	1893–1895	Michigan	Republican	1836–1898
Reuben Moon	1903–1913	Pennsylvania	Republican	1847–1919
Alex Mooney	2015–2025	West Virginia	Republican	1971–present
Charles A. Mooney	1919–1921; 1923–1931	Ohio	Democratic	1879–1931
William C. Mooney	1915–1917	Ohio	Republican	1855–1918
Allen F. Moore	1921–1925	Illinois	Republican	1869–1945
Andrew Moore	1789–1795	Virginia	Anti-Administration	1752–1821
Andrew Moore	1795–1797; 1804	Virginia	Democratic-Republican	1752–1821
Arch A. Moore Jr.	1957–1969	West Virginia	Republican	1923–2015
C. Ellis Moore	1919–1933	Ohio	Republican	1884–1941
Dennis Moore	1999–2011	Kansas	Democratic	1945–2021
Eliakim H. Moore	1869–1871	Ohio	Republican	1812–1900
Ely Moore	1835–1839	New York	Democratic	1798–1860
Gabriel Moore	1821–1825	Alabama	Democratic-Republican	1785–1845
Gabriel Moore	1825–1829	Alabama	Democratic	1785–1845
Heman A. Moore	1843–1844	Ohio	Democratic	1809–1844
Henry D. Moore	1849–1853	Pennsylvania	Whig	1817–1887
Henson Moore	1975–1987	Louisiana	Republican	1939–present
Horace Ladd Moore	1894–1895	Kansas	Democratic	1837–1914
J. Hampton Moore	1906–1920	Pennsylvania	Republican	1864–1950
Jeese H. Moore	1869–1873	Illinois	Republican	1817–1883
John Moore	1840–1843; 1851–1853	Louisiana	Whig	1788–1867
John M. Moore	1905–1913	Texas	Democratic	1862–1940
John William Moore	1925–1929; 1929–1933	Kentucky	Democratic	1877–1941
Laban T. Moore	1859–1861	Kentucky	Oppositionist	1829–1892
Littleton W. Moore	1887–1893	Texas	Democratic	1835–1911
Nicholas R. Moore	1803–1811; 1813–1815	Maryland	Democratic-Republican	1756–1816
Orren C. Moore	1889–1891	New Hampshire	Republican	1839–1893
Oscar F. Moore	1855–1857	Ohio	Republican	1817–1885
Paul J. Moore	1927–1929	New Jersey	Democratic	1868–1938
Robert Lee Moore	1923–1925	Georgia	Democratic	1867–1940
R. Walton Moore	1919–1931	Virginia	Democratic	1859–1941
Robert Moore	1817-1821	Pennsylvania	Democratic-Republican	1778–1831
Samuel Moore	1818–1822	Pennsylvania	Democratic-Republican	1774–1861
Samuel M. Moore	1833–1835	Virginia	National Republican	1796–1875
Sydenham Moore	1857–1861	Alabama	Democratic	1817–1862
Thomas Moore	1801–1813; 1815–1817	South Carolina	Democratic-Republican	1759–1822
Thomas Love Moore	1820–1823	Virginia	Democratic-Republican	17??–1862
Thomas P. Moore	1823–1825	Kentucky	Democratic-Republican	1797–1853
Thomas P. Moore	1825–1829	Kentucky	Democratic	1797–1853
William Moore	1867–1871	New Jersey	Republican	1810–1878
William Robert Moore	1881–1883	Tennessee	Republican	1830–1909
William S. Moore	1873-1875	Pennsylvania	Republican	1822–1877
Tom Van Horn Moorehead	1961–1963	Ohio	Republican	1898–1979
Merrill Moores	1915–1925	Indiana	Republican	1856–1929
Carlos Moorhead	1973–1997	California	Republican	1922–2011
James K. Moorhead	1859-1869	Pennsylvania	Republican	1806–1884
William S. Moorhead	1959-1981	Pennsylvania	Democratic	1923–1987
Henry D. Moorman	1927–1929	Kentucky	Democratic	1880–1939
Edward C. Moran Jr.	1933–1937	Maine	Democratic	1894–1967
Jerry Moran	1997–2011	Kansas	Republican	1954–present
Jim Moran	1991–2015	Virginia	Democratic	1945–present
Albert P. Morano	1951–1959	Connecticut	Republican	1908–1987
Charles S. Morehead	1847–1851	Kentucky	Whig	1802–1868
James Turner Morehead	1851–1853	North Carolina	Whig	1799–1875
John H. Morehead	1923–1935	Nebraska	Democratic	1861–1942
John Motley Morehead II	1909–1911	North Carolina	Republican	1866–1923
Connie Morella	1987–2003	Maryland	Republican	1931–present
Frank Morey	1869–1876	Louisiana	Republican	1840–1890
Henry Lee Morey	1881–1884; 1889–1891	Ohio	Republican	1841–1902
Charles H. Morgan	1875–1879; 1883–1885; 1893–1895	Missouri	Democratic	1842–1912
Charles H. Morgan	1909–1911	Missouri	Republican	1842–1912
Christopher Morgan	1839-1843	New York	Whig	1808–1877
Daniel Morgan	1797–1799	Virginia	Federalist	1736–1802
Dick T. Morgan	1909–1920	Oklahoma	Republican	1853–1920
Edwin B. Morgan	1853-1859	New York	Whig	1806–1881
George W. Morgan	1867–1873	Ohio	Democratic	1820–1893
James Morgan	1811–1813	New Jersey	Democratic-Republican	1756–1822
James B. Morgan	1885–1891	Mississippi	Democratic	1833–1892
John J. Morgan	1821–1825; 1834–1835	New York	Democratic-Republican	1770–1849
Lewis L. Morgan	1912–1917	Louisiana	Democratic	1876–1950
Stephen Morgan	1899–1905	Ohio	Republican	1854–1928
Thomas E. Morgan	1945-1977	Pennsylvania	Democratic	1906–1995
William M. Morgan	1921–1931	Ohio	Republican	1870–1935
William S. Morgan	1835–1839	Virginia	Democratic	1801–1878
John M. Morin	1913-1929	Pennsylvania	Republican	1868–1942
Theodore L. Moritz	1935-1937	Pennsylvania	Democratic	1892–1982
Joseph L. Morphis	1870–1873	Mississippi	Republican	1831–1913
Daniel J. Morrell	1867-1871	Pennsylvania	Republican	1821–1885
Edward de Veaux Morrell	1900–1907	Pennsylvania	Republican	1863–1917
Anson Morrill	1861–1863	Maine	Republican	1803–1887
Edmund N. Morrill	1883–1891	Kansas	Republican	1834–1909
Justin S. Morrill	1855–1867	Vermont	Republican	1810–1898
Samuel P. Morrill	1869–1871	Maine	Republican	1816–1892
Calvary Morris	1837–1843	Ohio	Whig	1798–1871
Daniel Morris	1863-1867	New York	Republican	1812–1889
Edward Joy Morris	1843–1845; 1857–1861	Pennsylvania	Whig	1815–1881
Isaac N. Morris	1857–1861	Illinois	Democratic	1812–1879
James R. Morris	1861–1865	Ohio	Democratic	1819–1899
Jonathan D. Morris	1847–1851	Ohio	Democratic	1804–1875
Joseph Morris	1843–1847	Ohio	Democratic	1795–1854
Joseph W. Morris	1923–1925	Kentucky	Democratic	1879–1937
Lewis R. Morris	1797–1803	Vermont	Federalist	1760–1825
Mathias Morris	1835–1837	Pennsylvania	National Republican	1787–1839
Mathias Morris	1837–1839	Pennsylvania	Whig	1787–1839
Page Morris	1897–1903	Minnesota	Republican	1853–1924
Samuel W. Morris	1837-1841	Pennsylvania	Democratic	1786–1847
Thomas Morris	1801-1803	New York	Federalist	1771–1849
Thomas G. Morris	1959–1969	New Mexico	Democratic	1919–2016
Toby Morris	1947–1953; 1957–1961	Oklahoma	Democratic	1899–1973
Bruce Morrison	1983–1991	Connecticut	Democratic	1944–present
Cameron A. Morrison	1943–1945	North Carolina	Democratic	1869–1953
George W. Morrison	1850–1851; 1853–1855	New Hampshire	Democratic	1809–1888
James H. Morrison	1943–1967	Louisiana	Democratic	1908–2000
James L. D. Morrison	1856–1857	Illinois	Democratic	1816–1888
John Alexander Morrison	1851-1853	Pennsylvania	Democratic	1814–1904
Martin A. Morrison	1909–1917	Indiana	Democratic	1862–1944
Sid Morrison	1981–1993	Washington	Republican	1933–2026
William R. Morrison	1863–1865; 1873–1887	Illinois	Democratic	1824–1909
John Morrissey	1867-1871	New York	Democratic	1831–1878
Jeremiah Morrow	1803–1813	Ohio	Democratic-Republican	1771–1852
Jeremiah Morrow	1840–1843	Ohio	Whig	1771–1852
John Morrow	1805–1809	Virginia	Democratic-Republican	N/A
John Morrow	1923–1929	New Mexico	Democratic	1865–1935
William W. Morrow	1885–1891	California	Republican	1843–1929
Elijah A. Morse	1889–1897	Massachusetts	Republican	1841–1898
Elmer A. Morse	1907–1913	Wisconsin	Republican	1870–1945
F. Bradford Morse	1961–1972	Massachusetts	Republican	1921–1994
Freeman H. Morse	1843–1845	Maine	Whig	1807–1891
Freeman H. Morse	1857–1861	Maine	Republican	1807–1891
Isaac E. Morse	1844–1851	Louisiana	Democratic	1809–1866
Leopold Morse	1877–1885; 1887–1889	Massachusetts	Democratic	1831–1892
Oliver A. Morse	1857-1859	New York	Republican	1815-1870
Jeremiah Morton	1849–1851	Virginia	Whig	1799–1878
Levi P. Morton	1879–1881	New York	Republican	1824–1920
Marcus Morton	1817–1821	Massachusetts	Democratic-Republican	1784–1864
Rogers Morton	1963–1971	Maryland	Republican	1914–1979
Thruston Ballard Morton	1947–1953	Kentucky	Republican	1907–1982
Jonathan O. Moseley	1805–1821	Connecticut	Federalist	1762–1838
William A. Moseley	1843-1847	New York	Whig	1798–1873
Guy L. Moser	1937-1943	Pennsylvania	Democratic	1886–1961
Charles L. Moses	1891–1897	Georgia	Democratic	1856–1910
James Mosgrove	1881-1883	Pennsylvania	Greenbacker	1821–1900
Charles Adams Mosher	1961–1977	Ohio	Republican	1906–1984
Harold G. Mosier	1937–1939	Ohio	Democratic	1889–1971
Hunter H. Moss Jr.	1913–1916	West Virginia	Republican	1874–1916
J. McKenzie Moss	1902–1903	Kentucky	Republican	1868–1929
John E. Moss	1953–1978	California	Democratic	1915–1997
Ralph W. Moss	1909–1917	Indiana	Democratic	1862–1919
Gordon N. Mott	1863–1864	Nevada	Republican	1812–1887
James Mott	1801–1805	New Jersey	Democratic-Republican	1739–1823
James W. Mott	1933–1945	Oregon	Republican	1883–1945
Luther W. Mott	1911–1923	New York	Republican	1874–1923
Richard Mott	1855–1859	Ohio	Republican	1804–1888
Ronald M. Mottl	1975–1983	Ohio	Democratic	1934–2023
Morgan M. Moulder	1949–1963	Missouri	Democratic	1904–1976
Mace Moulton	1845–1847	New Hampshire	Democratic	1796–1867
Samuel W. Moulton	1865–1867	Illinois	Republican	1821–1905
Samuel W. Moulton	1881–1885	Illinois	Democratic	1821–1905
Grant E. Mouser	1905–1909	Ohio	Republican	1868–1949
Grant E. Mouser Jr.	1929–1933	Ohio	Republican	1895–1943
Robert L. Mouton	1937–1941	Louisiana	Democratic	1892–1956
William Moxley	1909–1911	Illinois	Republican	1851–1938
P. H. Moynihan	1933–1935	Illinois	Republican	1869–1946
Norman A. Mozley	1895–1897	Missouri	Republican	1865–1922
Robert J. Mrazek	1983–1993	New York	Democratic	1945–present
Joseph Mruk	1943-1945	New York	Republican	1903–1995
Debbie Mucarsel-Powell	2019–2021	Florida	Democratic	1971–present
Sydney E. Mudd I	1890–1891; 1897–1911	Maryland	Republican	1858–1911
Sydney Emanuel Mudd II	1915–1924	Maryland	Republican	1885–1924
Francis Swaine Muhlenberg	1828–1829	Ohio	National Republican	1795–1831
Frederick Muhlenberg	1789–1791	Pennsylvania	Pro-Administration	1750–1801
Frederick Muhlenberg	1791–1795	Pennsylvania	Anti-Administration	1750–1801
Frederick Muhlenberg	1795–1797	Pennsylvania	Democratic-Republican	1750–1801
Frederick Augustus Muhlenberg	1947–1949	Pennsylvania	Republican	1887–1980
Henry Augustus Muhlenberg	1853–1854	Pennsylvania	Democratic	1823–1854
Henry A. P. Muhlenberg	1829–1833	Pennsylvania	Democratic	1782–1844
Peter Muhlenberg	1789–1791; 1793–1795	Pennsylvania	Anti-Administration	1746–1807
Peter Muhlenberg	1799–1801	Pennsylvania	Democratic-Republican	1746–1807
Michael Joseph Muldowney	1933–1935	Pennsylvania	Republican	1889–1947
Henry L. Muldrow	1877–1885	Mississippi	Democratic	1837–1905
William Oscar Mulkey	1914–1915	Alabama	Democratic	1871–1943
Nicholas Muller	1877-1881; 1883-1887; 1899-1901	New York	Democratic	1836–1917
Joseph Mullin	1847-1849	New York	Whig	1811-1882
Markwayne Mullin	2013–2023	Oklahoma	Republican	1977–present
James Mullins	1867–1869	Tennessee	Republican	1807-1873
Abraham J. Multer	1947-1967	New York	Democratic	1900–1986
Mick Mulvaney	2011-2017	South Carolina	Republican	1967–present
George Mumford	1817–1818	North Carolina	Democratic-Republican	????–1818
Gurdon S. Mumford	1805-1811	New York	Democratic–Republican	1764–1831
Walter M. Mumma	1951-1961	Pennsylvania	Republican	1890–1961
Karl Mundt	1939–1948	South Dakota	Republican	1900–1974
William Mungen	1867–1871	Ohio	Democratic	1821–1887
Luis Muñoz Rivera	1911–1916	Puerto Rico	Union	1859–1916
Thompson H. Murch	1879–1883	Maine	Greenbacker	1838–1886
Abe Murdock	1933–1941	Utah	Democratic	1893–1979
John R. Murdock	1937–1953	Arizona	Democratic	1885–1972
Victor Murdock	1903–1915	Kansas	Republican	1871–1945
William H. Murfree	1813–1817	North Carolina	Democratic-Republican	1781–1827
Charles Murphey	1851–1853	Georgia	Unionist	1799–1861
Arthur P. Murphy	1905–1907; 1909–1911	Missouri	Republican	1870–1914
Austin Murphy	1977–1995	Pennsylvania	Democratic	1927–2024
B. Frank Murphy	1919–1933	Ohio	Republican	1867–1938
Chris Murphy	2007–2013	Connecticut	Democratic	1973–present
Everett J. Murphy	1895–1897	Illinois	Republican	1852–1922
Henry C. Murphy	1843-1845; 1847-1849	New York	Democratic	1810–1882
James J. Murphy	1949-1953	New York	Democratic	1898–1962
James William Murphy	1907–1909	Wisconsin	Democratic	1858–1927
Jeremiah H. Murphy	1883–1887	Iowa	Democratic	1835–1893
John Murphy	1833–1835	Alabama	Democratic	1786–1841
John M. Murphy	1963–1981	New York	Democratic	1926–2015
John W. Murphy	1943–1946	Pennsylvania	Democratic	1902–1962
Morgan F. Murphy	1971–1981	Illinois	Democratic	1932–2016
Oakes Murphy	1895–1897	Arizona	Republican	1849–1908
Patrick Murphy	2007–2011	Pennsylvania	Democratic	1973–present
Patrick Murphy	2013–2017	Florida	Democratic	1983–present
Scott Murphy	2009–2011	New York	Democratic	1970–present
Tim Murphy	2003–2017	Pennsylvania	Republican	1952–2026
William T. Murphy	1959–1971	Illinois	Democratic	1899–1978
Ambrose S. Murray	1855–1859	New York	Whig	1807–1885
George W. Murray	1893–1895; 1896–1897	South Carolina	Republican	1853–1926
James C. Murray	1955–1957	Illinois	Democratic	1917–1999
John Murray	1817–1821	Pennsylvania	Democratic-Republican	1768–1834
John L. Murray	1837–1839	Kentucky	Democratic	1806–1842
Reid F. Murray	1939–1952	Wisconsin	Republican	1887–1952
Robert Maynard Murray	1883–1885	Ohio	Democratic	1841–1913
Thomas Murray Jr.	1821-1823	Pennsylvania	Democratic-Republican	1770–1823
Tom J. Murray	1943–1966	Tennessee	Democratic	1894–1971
William Murray	1851–1855	New York	Democratic	1803–1875
William Francis Murray	1911–1914	Massachusetts	Democratic	1881–1918
William H. Murray	1913–1917	Oklahoma	Democratic	1869–1956
William Vans Murray	1791–1795	Maryland	Pro-Administration	1760–1803
William Vans Murray	1795–1797	Maryland	Federalist	1760–1803
John Murtha	1974–2010	Pennsylvania	Democratic	1932–2010
Marilyn Musgrave	2003–2009	Colorado	Republican	1949–present
Harry W. Musselwhite	1933–1935	Michigan	Democratic	1868–1955
Ray Musto	1980–1981	Pennsylvania	Democratic	1929–2014
Howard Mutchler	1893–1895	Pennsylvania	Democratic	1859–1916
William Mutchler	1875–1877; 1881–1885; 1889–1893	Pennsylvania	Democratic	1831–1893
Amos Myers	1863–1865	Pennsylvania	Republican	1824–1893
Francis J. Myers	1939–1945	Pennsylvania	Democratic	1901–1956
Gary A. Myers	1975–1979	Pennsylvania	Republican	1937–2020
John T. Myers	1967–1997	Indiana	Republican	1927–2015
Leonard Myers	1863–1875	Pennsylvania	Republican	1827–1905
Michael Myers	1976–1980	Pennsylvania	Democratic	1943–present
William R. Myers	1879–1881	Indiana	Democratic	1836–1907
Sue Myrick	1995–2013	North Carolina	Republican	1941–present
