= William McAdoo =

William McAdoo may refer to:

- William McAdoo (New Jersey politician) (1853–1930), U.S. Representative from New Jersey
- William Gibbs McAdoo (1863–1941), U.S. Secretary of the Treasury and U.S. Senator from California
