= Lewis A. Brigham =

American politician

Member of the U.S. House of Representatives from New Jersey's 7th district
- In office March 4, 1879 – March 3, 1881
- Preceded by: Augustus Albert Hardenbergh
- Succeeded by: Augustus Albert Hardenbergh

Personal details
- Born: Lewis Alexander Brigham; January 2, 1831 New York Mills, New York, US
- Died: February 19, 1885 (aged 54) Jersey City, New Jersey, US
- Resting place: Old Bergen Church Cemetery
- Party: Republican

Lewis Alexander Brigham (January 2, 1831 – February 19, 1885) was an American lawyer, educator and Republican Party politician who represented New Jersey's 7th congressional district in the United States House of Representatives from 1879 to 1881.

== Early life and education ==
Brigham was born in New York Mills, New York, on January 2, 1831. He attended the district schools and Whitestown Seminary in Whitesboro, New York. He graduated from Hamilton College in 1849. He studied law, was admitted to the bar in 1855 and commenced practice in New York City.

He was superintendent of public schools, Bergen County, New Jersey, (Note: The source references "Bergen" as Bergen County, as New Jersey townships did not have separate school districts until 1894.) from 1866 to 1870. He was a member of the board of police commissioners of Jersey City, New Jersey from 1874 to 1876, and was a member of the New Jersey General Assembly in 1877.

== Congress ==
He was elected as a Republican to the Forty-sixth Congress, serving in office from March 4, 1879 – March 4, 1881, but was an unsuccessful candidate for reelection in 1880 to the Forty-eighth Congress.

== Death and burial ==
After leaving Congress, he resumed the practice of law in New York City. He died in Jersey City on February 19, 1885, and was interred in Old Bergen Church Cemetery.

== Notes ==
U.S. House of Representatives
Preceded by Augustus A. Hardenbergh	Member of the U.S. House of Representatives from New Jersey's 7th congressional district March 4, 1879 – March 4, 1881	Succeeded by Augustus A. Hardenbergh
