= New Jersey's 7th congressional district =

U.S. House district for New Jersey

Coordinates: 40.60°N 74.50°W

- Interactive map of district boundaries since January 3, 2023
- Representative: Thomas Kean Jr. R–Westfield
- Area: 1,347.62 mi^{2} (3,490.3 km^{2})
- Distribution: 85.81% urban; 14.19% rural
- Population (2025): 801,203
- Median household income: $140,748
- Ethnicity: 70.8% White; 12.2% Hispanic; 8.3% Asian; 4.8% Black; 3.4% Two or more races; 0.6% other
- Cook PVI: EVEN

New Jersey's 7th congressional district is a congressional district located in northern and central New Jersey. Since 2021, it has encompassed all of Hunterdon and Warren Counties, and parts of Morris, Somerset, Sussex, and Union Counties.

The district has become demographically more diverse over time, but has consistently remained one of the most competitive and affluent nationally. Per a 2024 study, it is the second wealthiest district statewide and the fifteenth wealthiest nationally, with one-third of households earning over $200,000 annually.

Republican Thomas Kean Jr. is the district's current representative until January 20, 2027. From then on, the district will be represented by Democrat Rebecca Bennett, who defeated him in the 2026 elections.

== History ==
=== 2000 redistricting ===
Every congressional district in the country was redistricted per the results of the 2000 census. New Jersey's redistricting panel reached a consensus where each district was made safer for their respective incumbents by removing and adding different towns. Parts of the 7th district such as Franklin Township that had historically voted Democratic were moved into the 12th in order to bolster incumbent Rush Holt, Plainfield was moved from the 7th to the 6th district, and Millburn was removed from the 7th and split between the 10th and 11th districts. Despite the redistricting, the 7th district was still the most competitive in New Jersey and was the only district considered to be so by political analysts.

=== 2008 election ===
In 2008, 8-year incumbent Mike Ferguson did not seek re-election. Republican primary voters chose State Senator Leonard Lance to replace him in a field of eight candidates. Linda Stender became the Democratic nominee unopposed.

In the general election, Lance defeated Stender by a margin of 25,833 votes.

=== 2012 redistricting and election ===
Per the results of the 2012 census, New Jersey's population decline resulted in the state electing 12 instead of 13 representatives. The 7th district was made more favorable to Republicans. Middlesex County was removed, and reliably Republican Hunterdon was added.

Both Ed Potosnak, who challenged Lance in the 2010 midterms, and former Edison Mayor Jun Choi announced their candidacies for the Democratic nomination. Choi withdrew from the race in December 2011 after redistricting left his Edison home outside the 7th District. Potosnak dropped out of the race in January 2012 to take a position as executive director of the New Jersey League of Conservation Voters, leaving a momentarily empty field for the Democratic nomination.

Lance won re-election against Democratic challenger Upendra J. Chivukula.

=== 2018 election ===
Tom Malinowski, former Assistant Secretary of State for Democracy, Human Rights, and Labor, was considered the front runner among the Democrats in the primary. Malinowski was endorsed by Westfield teacher/attorney Lisa Mandelblatt and attorney Scott Salmon when they withdrew from the race in February 2018. Others in the Democratic primary included lawyer Goutam Jois; and social worker Peter Jacob, who previously ran against Lance and lost.

Malinowski prevailed with 26,059 votes and 66.8% of the vote. Jacob finished second with 7,467 votes and 19.1% of the vote.

Green Party of New Jersey member Diane Moxley also announced her intent to run for the seat. Lindsay Brown, a product manager at the New York Post and a self-described progressive, ran in the Republican primary against Lance. Berkeley Heights banking executive Linda Weber and environmental advocate David Pringle withdrew in March 2018.

Lance won the Republican primary with 74.9%, and 24,856 votes.

During the primary campaigns in the fourth quarter of 2017, the Malinowski campaign raised $528,000 while the incumbent Lance raised $237,000. Jois raised $189,000 and Jacob raised $29,000.

Malinowski won the seat in the general election with 51.7% of the votes.

=== 2020 election ===
Incumbent Tom Malinowski ran in the Democratic primary uncontested. Challenger Thomas Kean Jr. (R) defeated Raafat Barsoom and Tom Phillips in the Republican primary with 79.4% (45,395) of the vote.

In the general election, Malinowski defeated Kean with 50.6% of the vote. The race was expected to be competitive, with Malinowski winning with a smaller margin than in 2018.

=== 2022 redistricting and election ===
Per the results of the 2020 Census, the New Jersey Congressional Redistricting Commission redrew the boundaries of the district effective January 6, 2022. Although the district remains competitive, Republicans now have a voter registration edge against Democrats.

Incumbent Tom Malinowski (D) faced 2020 challenger Thomas Kean Jr. once again in 2022. Kean prevailed, unseating Malinowski. It was one of 18 districts that would have voted for Joe Biden in the 2020 presidential election had they existed in their current configuration while being won or held by a Republican in 2022.

=== 2024 election ===
Incumbent Thomas Kean Jr. ran in the Republican party primary and won with 78% of the vote. Democratic challenger Sue Altman, a former Working Families Party leader, ran uncontested in her primary.

Kean defeated Altman in the general election with 51.7% of the vote. The race was only expected to be somewhat competitive, with political analysts giving Kean an advantage.

=== 2026 election ===
Rebecca Bennett, a health care technology executive and former United States Navy aviator; Michael Roth, a small business consultant and former Small Business Administration administrator in the Biden administration; Tina Shah, an ICU physician and former Senior Adviser to the US Surgeon General; and Brian Varela, a small business owner were all contenders to challenge Kean in the Democratic primary. Bennett ultimately prevailed with 45.3% of the vote. Kean ran unopposed in the Republican primary.

The general election campaign has drawn attention from media because of Kean's 117-day long absence from Congress due to his disclosed depression diagnosis. Upon his return, he has continued to run for re-election. Still, political analysts projected his loss, and once the results were reported on election day, Rebecca Bennett’s win was certified and she flipped the seat with 57.1% of the vote and a 21-point shift towards Democrats.

== Composition ==
For the 118th and successive Congresses (based on redistricting following the 2020 census), the district contains all or portions of six counties and 95 municipalities.

Hunterdon County (26):

All 26 municipalities

Morris County (12):

Chester Borough, Chester Township, Long Hill Township, Mendham Borough, Mendham Township (part; also 11th), Mine Hill Township, Mount Arlington, Mount Olive Township, Netcong, Roxbury, Washington Township, Wharton

Somerset County (13):

Bedminster, Bernards Township, Bernardsville, Branchburg, Bridgewater Township (part; also 12th; includes Bradley Gardens, Bridgewater Center, Green Knoll, Martinsville, and part of Finderne), Far Hills, Green Brook Township, Hillsborough Township (part; also 12th; includes Neshanic and part of Belle Mead and Flagtown), Peapack-Gladstone, Raritan, Somerville, Warren Township, Watchung

Sussex County (10):

Andover Borough, Byram Township, Fredon Township, Green Township, Hopatcong, Ogdensburg, Sparta, Stanhope, Stillwater Township, Walpack Township

Union County (12):

Berkeley Heights, Clark, Fanwood, Linden (part; also 10th), Mountainside, New Providence, Rahway, Scotch Plains, Springfield Township, Summit, Westfield, Winfield Township

Warren County (22):

All 22 municipalities

== Recent election results from statewide races ==
Year	Office	Results
2008	President	McCain 53% - 45%
2012	President	Romney 56% - 44%
2016	President	Trump 51% - 45%
2017	Governor	Guadagno 54% - 43%
2018	Senate	Hugin 53% - 43%
2020	President	Biden 51% - 47%
2020	Senate	Booker 49.2% - 49.0%
2021	Governor	Ciattarelli 56% - 43%
2024	President	Trump 50% - 48%
2024	Senate	Bashaw 50% - 48%
2025	Governor	Sherrill 51% - 49%

== Recent election results ==
2004 New Jersey 7th District general election
Party	Candidate	Votes	%	±%
Republican	Mike Ferguson (incumbent)	162,597	56.9%	
Democratic	Steve Brozak	119,081	41.7%	+.8
Independent	Thomas Abrams	2,153	.8%	N/A
Independent	Matthew Williams	2,046	.7%	N/A
Majority		43,516	15.2%	
Turnout		285,877		
Republican hold		Swing	+1.0%	

2006 New Jersey 7th District general election
Party	Candidate	Votes	%	±%
Republican	Mike Ferguson (incumbent)	98,399	49.4%	
Democratic	Linda Stender	95,454	48.0%	+6.3
Independent	Thomas Abrams	3,176	1.6%	+.8%
Libertarian	Darren Young	2,046	1.0%	N/A
Majority		2,945	1.5%	−13.7
Turnout		199,075		
Republican hold		Swing	+6.9%	

2008 New Jersey 7th District general election
Party	Candidate	Votes	%	±%
Republican	Leonard Lance	142,092	50.8%	
Democratic	Linda Stender	116,255	41.6%	−6.4
Independent	Michael Hsing	15,826	5.7%	N/A
Independent	Dean Greco	3,008	1.1%	N/A
Independent	Thomas Abrams	2,408	.9%	−0.7
Majority		25,837	9.2%	+7.7
Turnout		279,589		
Republican hold		Swing	−3.9%	

2010 New Jersey 7th District general election
Party	Candidate	Votes	%	±%
Republican	Leonard Lance (incumbent)	104,642	59.4%	
Democratic	Ed Potosnak	71,486	40.6%	
Majority		33,156	18.9%	
Turnout		176,128		
Republican hold		Swing		

2012 New Jersey 7th District general election
Party	Candidate	Votes	%	±%
Republican	Leonard Lance (incumbent)	175,662	57.2%	
Democratic	Upendra Chivukula	123,057	40.0%	
Independent	Dennis Breen	4,518	1.5%	
Libertarian	Patrick McKnight	4,078	1.3%	
Majority		52,605	17.1%	
Turnout		307,315		
Republican hold		Swing		

2014 New Jersey 7th District general election
Party	Candidate	Votes	%	±%
Republican	Leonard Lance (incumbent)	104,287	59.25%	
Democratic	Janice Kovach	68,232	38.77%	
Libertarian	Jim Gawron	3,478	1.98%	
Majority		36,055	20.5%	
Turnout		175,997		
Republican hold		Swing		

2016 New Jersey 7th District general election
Party	Candidate	Votes	%	±%
Republican	Leonard Lance (incumbent)	185,850	54.08%	
Democratic	Peter Jacob	148,188	43.12%	
Libertarian	Dan O'Neill	5,343	1.56%	
Conservative	Arthur T. Haussmann, Jr.	4,254	1.24%	
Majority		37,662	10.96%	
Turnout		343,635		
Republican hold		Swing		

2018 New Jersey 7th District general election
Party	Candidate	Votes	%
Democratic	Tom Malinowski	166,985	51.7
Republican	Leonard Lance (incumbent)	150,785	46.7
Green	Diane Moxley	2,676	0.8
Independent	Gregg Mele	2,296	0.7
Total votes		322,742	100.0
Democratic gain from Republican			

2020 New Jersey 7th District general election
Party	Candidate	Votes	%
Democratic	Tom Malinowski (incumbent)	219,688	50.6
Republican	Tom Kean Jr.	214,359	49.4
Total votes		434,047	100.0
Democratic hold			

2022 New Jersey 7th District general election
Party	Candidate	Votes	%
Republican	Tom Kean, Jr.	159,392	51.4
Democratic	Tom Malinowski (incumbent)	150,701	48.6
Total votes		310,093	100.0
Republican gain from Democratic			

2024 New Jersey's 7th congressional district election
Party	Candidate	Votes	%
Republican	Thomas Kean Jr. (incumbent)	223,331	51.8
Democratic	Sue Altman	200,025	46.4
Libertarian	Lana Leguia	3,784	0.9
Green	Andrew Black	4,258	1.0
Total votes		431,398	100.0
Republican hold			

2026 New Jersey's 7th congressional district election
Party	Candidate	Votes	%
Democratic	Rebecca Bennett	187,275	57.1
Republican	Thomas Kean Jr.	135,560	41.3
Independent	Seamus Patrick O'Toole	5,042	1.5
Total votes		327,877	100.0
Democratic gain from Republican			

== List of members representing the district ==
Member (Residence)	Party	Years	Cong ress	Electoral history	Counties/towns
District established March 4, 1873
Isaac W. Scudder (Jersey City)	Republican	March 4, 1873 – March 3, 1875		Elected in 1872. Retired.	1873–1893: Hudson County
Augustus Albert Hardenbergh (Jersey City)	Democratic	March 4, 1875 – March 3, 1879	44th 45th	Elected in 1874. Re-elected in 1876. Retired.	1873–1893: Hudson County
Lewis A. Brigham (Jersey City)	Republican	March 4, 1879 – March 3, 1881		Elected in 1878. Lost re-election.	1873–1893: Hudson County
Augustus Albert Hardenbergh (Jersey City)	Democratic	March 4, 1881 – March 3, 1883		Elected in 1880. Retired.	1873–1893: Hudson County
William McAdoo (Jersey City)	Democratic	March 4, 1883 – March 3, 1891	48th 49th 50th 51st	Elected in 1882. Re-elected in 1884. Re-elected in 1886. Re-elected in 1888. Lost renomination.	1873–1893: Hudson County
Edward F. McDonald (Harrison)	Democratic	March 4, 1891 – November 5, 1892		Elected in 1890. Died.	1873–1893: Hudson County
Vacant		November 5, 1892 – March 3, 1893			1873–1893: Hudson County
George Bragg Fielder (Jersey City)	Democratic	March 4, 1893 – March 3, 1895		Elected in 1892. Retired.	1893–1895: Harrison, Hoboken, Jersey City, and Kearney (including present-day East Newark)
Thomas McEwan Jr. (Jersey City)	Republican	March 4, 1895 – March 3, 1899	54th 55th	Elected in 1894. Re-elected in 1896. Retired.	1895–1903: Hudson County (except Bayonne)
William Davis Daly (Hoboken)	Democratic	March 4, 1899 – July 31, 1900		Elected in 1898. Died.	1895–1903: Hudson County (except Bayonne)
Vacant		July 31, 1900 – December 3, 1900			1895–1903: Hudson County (except Bayonne)
Allan Langdon McDermott (Jersey City)	Democratic	December 3, 1900 – March 3, 1903	56th 57th	Elected to finish Daly's term. Also elected to the next full term. Redistricted to the 10th district.	1895–1903: Hudson County (except Bayonne)
Richard W. Parker (Newark)	Republican	March 4, 1903 – March 3, 1911	58th 59th 60th 61st	Redistricted from the 6th district and re-elected in 1902. Re-elected in 1904. Re-elected in 1906. Re-elected in 1908. Lost re-election.	1903–1913: Northern Essex County (excluding Irvington, Maplewood, Millburn, South Orange, and parts of Newark)
Edward W. Townsend (Montclair)	Democratic	March 4, 1911 – March 3, 1913		Elected in 1910. Redistricted to the 10th district.	1903–1913: Northern Essex County (excluding Irvington, Maplewood, Millburn, South Orange, and parts of Newark)
Robert G. Bremner (Passaic)	Democratic	March 4, 1913 – February 5, 1914		Elected in 1912. Died.	1913–1933: Southern Passaic County (Clifton, Haledon, Hawthorne, Little Falls, North Haledon, Passaic, Paterson, Prospect Park, Totowa, Wayne, and West Paterson)
Vacant		February 5, 1914 – April 7, 1914			1913–1933: Southern Passaic County (Clifton, Haledon, Hawthorne, Little Falls, North Haledon, Passaic, Paterson, Prospect Park, Totowa, Wayne, and West Paterson)
Dow H. Drukker (Passaic)	Republican	April 7, 1914 – March 3, 1919	63rd 64th 65th	Elected to finish Bremner's term. Re-elected later in 1914. Re-elected in 1916. Retired.	1913–1933: Southern Passaic County (Clifton, Haledon, Hawthorne, Little Falls, North Haledon, Passaic, Paterson, Prospect Park, Totowa, Wayne, and West Paterson)
Amos H. Radcliffe (Paterson)	Republican	March 4, 1919 – March 3, 1923	66th 67th	Elected in 1918. Re-elected in 1920. Lost renomination.	1913–1933: Southern Passaic County (Clifton, Haledon, Hawthorne, Little Falls, North Haledon, Passaic, Paterson, Prospect Park, Totowa, Wayne, and West Paterson)
George N. Seger (Passaic)	Republican	March 4, 1923 – March 3, 1933	68th 69th 70th 71st 72nd	Elected in 1922. Re-elected in 1924. Re-elected in 1926. Re-elected in 1928. Re-elected in 1930. Redistricted to the 8th district.	1913–1933: Southern Passaic County (Clifton, Haledon, Hawthorne, Little Falls, North Haledon, Passaic, Paterson, Prospect Park, Totowa, Wayne, and West Paterson)
Randolph Perkins (Woodcliff Lake)	Republican	March 4, 1933 – May 25, 1936	73rd 74th	Redistricted from the 6th district and re-elected in 1932. Re-elected in 1934. Died.	1933–1967: Huntderon, Sussex, Warren, parts of Bergen and northern Passaic (Ringwood and West Miford)
Vacant		May 25, 1936 – January 3, 1937			1933–1967: Huntderon, Sussex, Warren, parts of Bergen and northern Passaic (Ringwood and West Miford)
J. Parnell Thomas (Allendale)	Republican	January 3, 1937 – January 2, 1950	75th 76th 77th 78th 79th 80th 81st	Elected in 1936; Re-elected in 1938. Re-elected in 1940. Re-elected in 1942. Re-elected in 1944. Re-elected in 1946. Re-elected in 1948. Resigned upon being convicted of fraud.	1933–1967: Huntderon, Sussex, Warren, parts of Bergen and northern Passaic (Ringwood and West Miford)
Vacant		January 2, 1950 – February 6, 1950			1933–1967: Huntderon, Sussex, Warren, parts of Bergen and northern Passaic (Ringwood and West Miford)
William B. Widnall (Saddle River)	Republican	February 6, 1950 – December 31, 1974	81st 82nd 83rd 84th 85th 86th 87th 88th 89th 90th 91st 92nd 93rd	Elected to finish Thomas's term. Re-elected in 1950. Re-elected in 1952. Re-elected in 1954. Re-elected in 1956. Re-elected in 1958. Re-elected in 1960. Re-elected in 1962. Re-elected in 1964. Re-elected in 1966. Re-elected in 1968. Re-elected in 1970. Re-elected in 1972. Lost re-election and resigned early.	1933–1967: Huntderon, Sussex, Warren, parts of Bergen and northern Passaic (Ringwood and West Miford)
William B. Widnall (Saddle River)	Republican	February 6, 1950 – December 31, 1974	81st 82nd 83rd 84th 85th 86th 87th 88th 89th 90th 91st 92nd 93rd	Elected to finish Thomas's term. Re-elected in 1950. Re-elected in 1952. Re-elected in 1954. Re-elected in 1956. Re-elected in 1958. Re-elected in 1960. Re-elected in 1962. Re-elected in 1964. Re-elected in 1966. Re-elected in 1968. Re-elected in 1970. Re-elected in 1972. Lost re-election and resigned early.	1967–1983: Western Bergen County
Andrew Maguire (Ridgewood)	Democratic	January 3, 1975 – January 3, 1981	94th 95th 96th	Elected in 1974. Re-elected in 1976. Re-elected in 1978. Lost re-election.	1967–1983: Western Bergen County
Marge Roukema (Ridgewood)	Republican	January 3, 1981 – January 3, 1983		Elected in 1980. Redistricted to the 5th district.	1967–1983: Western Bergen County
Matthew John Rinaldo (Union Township)	Republican	January 3, 1983 – January 3, 1993	98th 99th 100th 101st 102nd	Redistricted from the 12th district and Re-elected in 1982. Re-elected in 1984. Re-elected in 1986. Re-elected in 1968. Re-elected in 1990. Retired.	1983–1985: Parts of Mercer (Princeton Township and Princeton Borough), Middlesex (Cranbury, Jamesburg, Monroe Township, North Brunswick, South Brunswick), Monmouth (Freehold Township, Freehold Borough, Marlboro Township, and Millstone Township), eastern Somerset, and Union
Matthew John Rinaldo (Union Township)	Republican	January 3, 1983 – January 3, 1993	98th 99th 100th 101st 102nd	Redistricted from the 12th district and Re-elected in 1982. Re-elected in 1984. Re-elected in 1986. Re-elected in 1968. Re-elected in 1990. Retired.	1985–1993: Parts of Essex (Millburn), Middlesex (Dunellen and Middlesex Borough), Somerset, and Union
Bob Franks (New Providence)	Republican	January 3, 1993 – January 3, 2001	103rd 104th 105th 106th	Elected in 1992. Re-elected in 1994. Re-elected in 1996. Re-elected in 1998. Retired to run for U.S. senator.	1993–2003: Parts of Essex, Middlesex, Somerset, and Union
Mike Ferguson (Warren Township)	Republican	January 3, 2001 – January 3, 2009	107th 108th 109th 110th	Elected in 2000. Re-elected in 2002. Re-elected in 2004. Re-elected in 2006. Retired.	1993–2003: Parts of Essex, Middlesex, Somerset, and Union
Mike Ferguson (Warren Township)	Republican	January 3, 2001 – January 3, 2009	107th 108th 109th 110th	Elected in 2000. Re-elected in 2002. Re-elected in 2004. Re-elected in 2006. Retired.	2003–2013: Parts of Hunterdon, Middlesex, Somerset, and Union
Leonard Lance (Clinton Township)	Republican	January 3, 2009 – January 3, 2019	111th 112th 113th 114th 115th	Elected in 2008. Re-elected in 2010. Re-elected in 2012. Re-elected in 2014. Re-elected in 2016. Lost re-election.	2003–2013: Parts of Hunterdon, Middlesex, Somerset, and Union
Leonard Lance (Clinton Township)	Republican	January 3, 2009 – January 3, 2019	111th 112th 113th 114th 115th	Elected in 2008. Re-elected in 2010. Re-elected in 2012. Re-elected in 2014. Re-elected in 2016. Lost re-election.	2013–2023: Hunterdon and parts of Essex (Millburn), Morris, Somerset, Union and Warren
Tom Malinowski (Rocky Hill)	Democratic	January 3, 2019 – January 3, 2023	116th 117th	Elected in 2018. Re-elected in 2020. Lost re-election.	2013–2023: Hunterdon and parts of Essex (Millburn), Morris, Somerset, Union and Warren
Thomas Kean Jr. (Westfield)	Republican	January 3, 2023 – present	118th 119th	Elected in 2022. Re-elected in 2024. Lost re-election.	2023–present: Warren, Hunterdon, and parts of Morris, Somerset, Sussex, Union
Rebecca Bennett (Bridgewater)	Democratic	Assuming office on January 3, 2027	120th	Elected in 2026.	2023–present: Warren, Hunterdon, and parts of Morris, Somerset, Sussex, Union
