= George B. Fielder =

Congressman for New Jersey

George Bragg Fielder
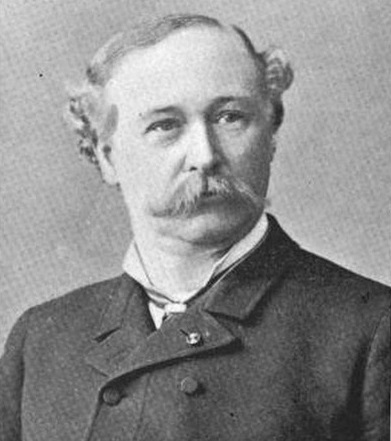

Member of the U.S. House of Representatives from New Jersey's 7th district
- In office March 4, 1893 – March 3, 1895
- Preceded by: Edward F. McDonald
- Succeeded by: Thomas McEwan Jr.

Personal details
- Born: July 24, 1842 Jersey City, New Jersey
- Died: August 14, 1906 (aged 64) Windham, New York
- Party: Democratic

George Bragg Fielder (July 24, 1842 – August 14, 1906) was an American Civil War veteran, banker, and politician who represented New Jersey's 7th congressional district in the United States House of Representatives for one term from 1893–1895.

His son, James Fairman Fielder, became the 35th Governor of New Jersey.

== Biography ==
Born in Jersey City, New Jersey in 1842, he engaged in banking and with his father built the New Jersey Southern and New York, New Hampshire and Willimantic Railroads. In 1862, at the outbreak of the American Civil War, he joined the Union Army as a private, and rose to the rank of lieutenant while serving throughout the war.

== Political career ==
He entered politics and was elected Register of Hudson County, New Jersey for two terms from 1884 until 1893.

A Democrat, he won a seat in the United States House of Representatives in the 53rd United States Congress, representing the 7th District for a single term from March 4, 1893 to March 3, 1895.

== Later life ==
After his term was over, he declined to run again. He was elected to a third term as Register of Hudson County in 1895.

He died in 1906 in Windham, New York and is buried in Bayview – New York Bay Cemetery in Jersey City.

He did not live to see his son, James, serve as governor of New Jersey from 1913 to 1917.

U.S. House of Representatives
Preceded by Edward F. McDonald	Member of the U.S. House of Representatives from New Jersey's 7th congressional district March 4, 1893 – March 3, 1895	Succeeded by Thomas McEwan Jr.
