= Aline McDermott =

American actress (1881–1951)

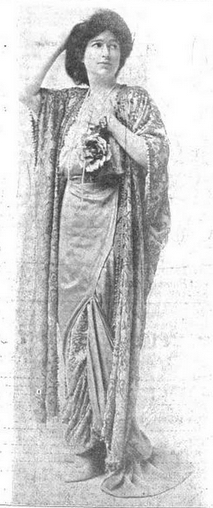
- Aline McDermott, from a 1916 publication
- Born: October 23, 1881; Jersey City, New Jersey
- Died: February 16, 1951; New York City
- Occupation: Actress
- Parent: Allan Langdon McDermott

Mary Aline Langdon McDermott (October 23, 1881 – February 16, 1951) was an American actress. She created the role of Mrs. Lily Mortar in the original Broadway production of Lillian Hellman's The Children's Hour (1934). She was also in the original Broadway cast of Thornton Wilder's Our Town (1938).

== Early life ==
McDermott was born in Jersey City, New Jersey, the daughter of Allan Langdon McDermott and Margaret Elizabeth O'Neill McDermott. Her father was a lawyer and a Congressman.

== Career ==
McDermott was a stage actress. Her Broadway credits included roles in The Runaway (1911), Go West, Young Man (1923), Bachelors' Brides (1925), American Born (1925), The Rhapsody (1930), Page Pygmalion (1932), The Children's Hour (1934–1936), Our Town (1938), Blind Alley (1940), and State of the Union (1945–1947). She also appeared on the London stage. She was a leading lady in touring and stock companies including the Northampton Players, and was known for counseling young women away from a stage career.

== Personal life ==
McDermott was a noted amateur photographer in the 1910s. She injured her arm when she slipped on an icy sidewalk in 1936. She died in 1951, in New York City.
