= William D. Daly =

American politician (1851–1900)

William Davis Daly
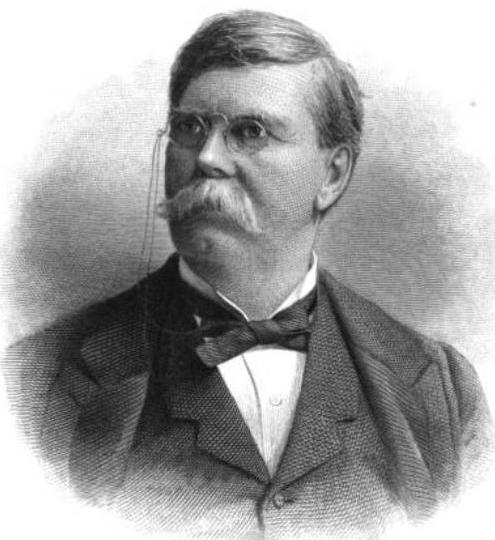

Member of the U.S. House of Representatives from New Jersey's 7th district
- In office March 4, 1899 – July 31, 1900
- Preceded by: Thomas McEwan Jr.
- Succeeded by: Allan Langdon McDermott

Member of the New Jersey General Assembly
- In office 1889-1891

Personal details
- Born: June 4, 1851 Jersey City, New Jersey
- Died: July 31, 1900 (aged 49) Hoboken, New Jersey
- Party: Democratic

William Davis Daly (June 4, 1851 – July 31, 1900) was an American Democratic Party politician who represented New Jersey's 7th congressional district in the United States House of Representatives from 1899 to 1900.

== Early life and education ==
Daly was born in Jersey City, New Jersey. He attended the public schools, and from the age of fourteen until he was nineteen was employed as an iron molder. He studied law, was admitted to the bar in 1874 and commenced practice in Hudson County, New Jersey.

== Career ==
He was an assistant United States attorney for New Jersey 1885-1888. He was a member of the New Jersey General Assembly from 1889 to 1891, and a judge of the district court of Hoboken from 1891 until his resignation in 1892. He was a member of the New Jersey Senate from 1892 to 1898. He was a delegate to the 1896 Democratic National Convention, chairman of the Democratic State convention in 1896 and member of the State committee from 1896 to 1898.

== Tenure in Congress ==
Daly was elected as a Democrat to the Fifty-sixth Congress and served from March 4, 1899, until his death at Hoboken, New Jersey. His funeral was held at the First Presbyterian Church in Hoboken and was interred in New York Bay Cemetery (now known as Bayview – New York Bay Cemetery) in Jersey City, New Jersey.

== See also ==
- List of members of the United States Congress who died in office (1900–1949)

== Notes ==
U.S. House of Representatives
Preceded by Thomas McEwan Jr.	Member of the U.S. House of Representatives from New Jersey's 7th congressional district March 4, 1899 – July 31, 1900	Succeeded by Allan Langdon McDermott
