= Augustus A. Hardenbergh =

American politician (1830–1889)

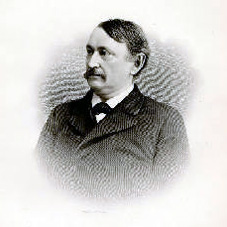

Member of the U.S. House of Representatives from New Jersey's 7th district
- In office March 4, 1881 – March 3, 1883
- Preceded by: Lewis A. Brigham
- Succeeded by: William McAdoo
- In office March 4, 1875 – March 3, 1879
- Preceded by: Isaac W. Scudder
- Succeeded by: Lewis A. Brigham

Personal details
- Born: Augustus Albert Hardenbergh; May 18, 1830 New Brunswick, New Jersey
- Died: October 5, 1889 (aged 59) Jersey City, New Jersey
- Resting place: Mount Pleasant Cemetery
- Party: Democratic

Augustus Albert Hardenbergh (May 18, 1830 in New Brunswick, New Jersey – October 5, 1889 in Jersey City, New Jersey) was an American Democratic Party politician who represented New Jersey's 7th congressional district in the United States House of Representatives from 1875 to 1879, and again from 1881 to 1883.

== Early life and career ==
Hardenbergh was born in New Brunswick, New Jersey on May 18, 1830. He attended Rutgers College in 1844 and took up residence in Jersey City, New Jersey in 1846 and was employed in a banking house in New York City.

He was a clerk in the Hudson County National Bank in 1852. He served as a member of the New Jersey General Assembly in 1853 and 1854. He was a member of the board of education in 1855 and 1856, and a member of the common council of Jersey City 1857-1863, serving as president in 1860. He moved to Bergen, New Jersey in 1863 and was a member of the city council of Bergen. He was elected State director of railroads in 1868, and moved to Demarest, New Jersey, that same year. He was a delegate to the 1872 Democratic National Convention.

He moved to Jersey City in 1873 and was elected president of the Northern Railroad of New Jersey in 1874.

== Tenure in Congress ==
Hardenbergh was elected as a Democrat to the Forty-fourth and Forty-fifth Congresses, serving in office from March 4, 1875 – March 3, 1879, but declined to be a candidate for renomination in 1878. He was elected president of the Hudson County National Bank in 1878. He was elected to the Forty-seventh Congress, serving in office from March 4, 1881 – March 3, 1883, but was not a candidate for renomination in 1882.

Hardenbergh was one of the rare Democrats willing to buck his party's overwhelming support for the exclusion of Chinese laborers in 1882. He condemned the prejudice which was a key force in the push for Chinese exclusion, asking "Is freedom incompatible with any race . . . ?" Hardenbergh was well aware of the stifling party pressure to support exclusion, but responded that "In the vindication of human rights I will know no party.

== Later career ==
After leaving Congress, he was appointed a member of the Jersey City Board of Finance and Taxation in 1883-1889, and was appointed by Governor Leon Abbett as a trustee of the State reform school in 1884.

== Death and burial ==
He died in Jersey City on October 5, 1889. He was interred in Mount Pleasant Cemetery in Newark, New Jersey.

== Family ==
Hardenbergh was the son of Cornelius Low Hardenbergh (1790-1851), a mayor of New Brunswick, New Jersey from 1829 to 1838, and his wife, Mary (née Warren) Hardenbergh (1802-1851). His grandfather, Jacob Rutsen Hardenbergh Jr. (1768-1844) was a Trustee of Rutgers University from 1792 to 1841, and was a graduate of that institution. His great-grandfather, Jacob Rutsen Hardenbergh, helped found Rutgers in 1766 as Queen's College, and served as the institution's first President from 1786 to 1790. His 3rd great-grandfather was Johannes Hardenbergh, and the town of Hardenburgh, New York is named after him.

Hardenbergh is also a descendant of New Paltz Patentee (founder) and Huguenot Louis DuBois, and the Hasbrouck family of Ulster County, New York. His second cousin, Cornelius A.J. Hardenbergh, was Town Supervisor of Shawangunk, New York from 1861 to 1867 and 1876 to 1882, and a member of the New York State Assembly from 1885 to 1886. His third cousin, Jacob Hardenbergh, served as a New York State Senator from 1870 to 1872.

== Notes ==
U.S. House of Representatives
Preceded by Isaac W. Scudder	Member of the U.S. House of Representatives from New Jersey's 7th congressional district March 4, 1875–March 3, 1879	Succeeded by Lewis A. Brigham
Preceded by Lewis A. Brigham	Member of the U.S. House of Representatives from New Jersey's 7th congressional district March 4, 1881–March 3, 1883	Succeeded by William McAdoo
