= Isaac W. Scudder =

American politician (1816–1881)

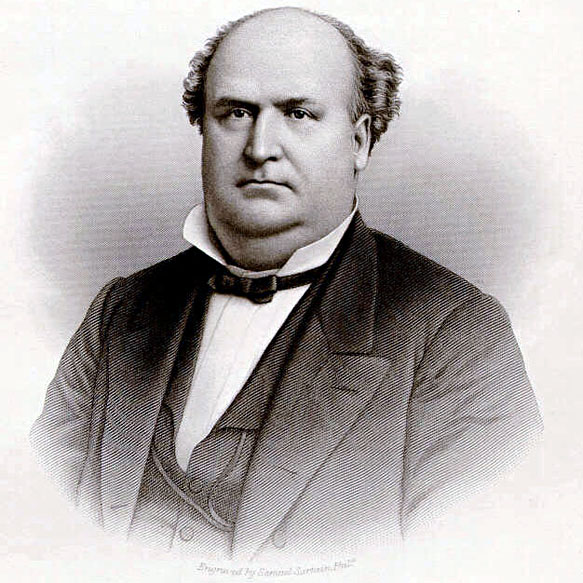

Member of the U.S. House of Representatives from New Jersey's 7th district
- In office March 4, 1873 – March 3, 1875
- Preceded by: District created
- Succeeded by: Augustus Albert Hardenbergh

Personal details
- Born: Isaac Williamson Scudder; 1816 Elizabeth, New Jersey, US
- Died: September 10, 1881 (aged 64–65) Jersey City, New Jersey, US
- Resting place: St. John's Episcopal Churchyard, Elizabeth, New Jersey
- Party: Republican

Isaac Williamson Scudder (1816 – September 10, 1881) was a U.S. representative from New Jersey for one term from 1873 to 1875.

== Early life and education ==
Born in Elizabethtown (now Elizabeth, New Jersey), Scudder completed preparatory studies. He studied law, was admitted to the bar in 1838 and commenced practice in Elizabeth, New Jersey.

== Career ==
He moved to Jersey City. He was prosecutor of the pleas of Hudson County from 1845 to 1855, and was appointed as a member of the first police commission of Jersey City, in 1866.

Scudder was elected director and counsel of the New Jersey Railroad and Transportation Co. May 14, 1866, and director of the United New Jersey Railroad and Canal Company on May 21, 1872.

=== Congress ===
Scudder was elected as a Republican to the Forty-third Congress (March 4, 1873 – March 3, 1875). He was not a candidate for reelection in 1874. He was appointed solicitor of the Pennsylvania Railroad for Hudson County, New Jersey, June 23, 1875.

== Death and burial ==
He died in Jersey City September 10, 1881. He was interred in St. John's Episcopal Churchyard in Elizabeth, New Jersey.

U.S. House of Representatives
Preceded by New district	Member of the U.S. House of Representatives from New Jersey's 7th congressional district March 4, 1873–March 3, 1875	Succeeded by Augustus A. Hardenbergh
