= Allan L. McDermott =

American politician (1854-1908)

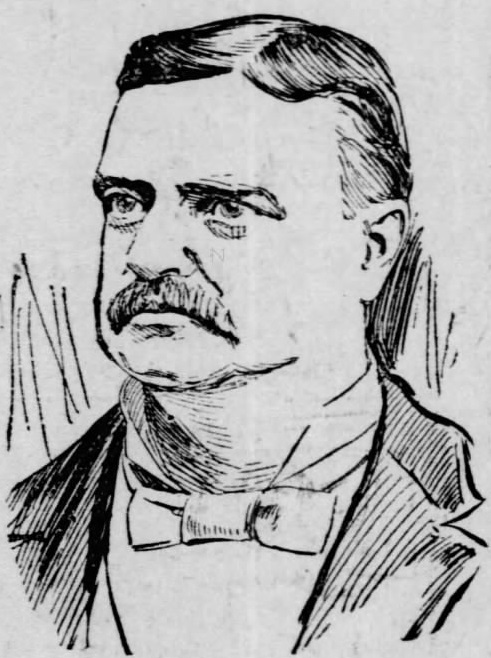
- From the October 4, 1896, issue of The Philadelphia Inquirer

Member of the U.S. House of Representatives from New Jersey's 10th district
- In office December 3, 1900 – March 3, 1907
- Preceded by: William Davis Daly
- Succeeded by: James A. Hamill
- Constituency: 7th district (1900–1903); 10th district (1013–1907)

Personal details
- Born: Allan Langdon McDermott; March 30, 1854 South Boston, Massachusetts
- Died: October 26, 1908 (aged 54) Jersey City, New Jersey
- Party: Democratic

Allan Langdon McDermott (March 30, 1854 – October 26, 1908) was an American Democratic Party politician who represented New Jersey's 7th congressional district from 1900 to 1903, and the 10th district from 1903 to 1907.

== Early life ==
McDermott was born in South Boston, Massachusetts, on March 30, 1854, to a Scottish family. He attended the local schools, and was trained as a printer. He worked as a newspaper reporter for several years, and then began to study law with Leon Abbett. He graduated from the law department of University of the City of New York (now New York University School of Law). He was admitted to the bar in November 1877, and commenced practice in Jersey City, New Jersey.

== Career ==
McDermott was corporation attorney for Jersey City from 1879 to 1883. He was a member of the New Jersey General Assembly in 1880 and 1881, and served as a district court judge from 1883 to 1886. He was the president of the Jersey City Board of Finance and Taxation from 1883 to 1886. He was a member of the State Board of Taxation from 1884 to 1886, chairman of the New Jersey State Democratic Committee from 1885 to 1895, and a member of the commission to revise the constitution of New Jersey in 1894. He was a candidate of the Democratic legislative caucus for United States Senator in 1895 and 1902. He was a delegate at large to the Democratic National Convention in 1896. He was a member of the New Jersey Senate in 1899 and 1900.

He was elected as a Democrat to the Fifty-sixth Congress to fill the vacancy caused by the death of William D. Daly. He was reelected to the Fifty-seventh, Fifty-eighth, and Fifty-ninth Congresses and served from December 3, 1900, to March 3, 1907. He was not a candidate for renomination in 1906.

== Death and burial ==
McDermott died in Jersey City on October 26, 1908, and is buried in Hoboken Cemetery, North Bergen, New Jersey.

== Family ==
McDermott was married to Margaret O'Neill. They were the parents of a son, Walter, and a daughter, actress Aline McDermott.

U.S. House of Representatives
Preceded by William D. Daly	Member of the U.S. House of Representatives from New Jersey's 7th congressional district December 3, 1900 – March 3, 1903	Succeeded by Richard W. Parker
Preceded by New District	Member of the U.S. House of Representatives from New Jersey's 10th congressional district March 4, 1903 – March 3, 1907	Succeeded by James A. Hamill
