= Thomas McEwan Jr. =

American politician (1854-1926)

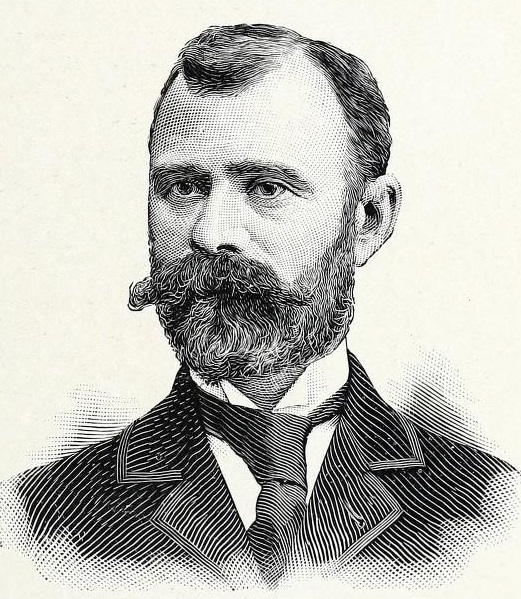

Member of the U.S. House of Representatives from New Jersey's 7th district
- In office March 4, 1895 – March 3, 1899
- Preceded by: George Bragg Fielder
- Succeeded by: William Davis Daly

Personal details
- Born: February 26, 1854 Paterson, New Jersey
- Died: September 11, 1926 (aged 72) Jersey City, New Jersey
- Party: Republican

Thomas McEwan Jr. (February 26, 1854, Paterson, New Jersey – September 11, 1926) was an American Republican Party politician who represented New Jersey's 7th congressional district in the United States House of Representatives from 1895 to 1899.

== Biography ==
McEwan was born in Paterson, New Jersey on February 26, 1854. He attended the public schools and became a civil engineer. He attended the law department of Columbia Law School was admitted to the bar about 1885 and commenced practice in New York City and Jersey City, New Jersey. He was the assessor of the fourth district of Jersey City in 1886 and 1887. He was secretary to Dr. Morgan Dix, rector of Trinity Church in New York City from 1886-1906. He was tax assessor of Jersey City in 1887 and 1888, and was the United States commissioner and chief supervisor of elections for the district of New Jersey from August 1892 to October 1893. McEwan was a delegate to and secretary of every Republican convention of New Jersey and Hudson County from 1877–1896, and was secretary of the Hudson County Republican general committee from 1878-1893. He served as a delegate to the Republican National Convention in 1892 and 1896. He was a member of the New Jersey General Assembly in 1893 and 1894 and served as Republican leader in 1894.

McEwan was elected as a Republican to the Fifty-fourth and Fifty-fifth Congresses, serving in office from March 4, 1895 to March 3, 1899, but was not a candidate for renomination in 1898.

After leaving Congress, he resumed the practice of law and also engaged in banking in West Hoboken, New Jersey, from 1904 until July 1, 1924, when he retired. He was controller of Jersey City 1906 and 1907. He died in Jersey City on September 11, 1926, and was interred in Flower Hill Cemetery in North Bergen, New Jersey.

U.S. House of Representatives
Preceded by George Bragg Fielder	Member of the U.S. House of Representatives from New Jersey's 7th congressional district March 4, 1895–March 3, 1899	Succeeded by William D. Daly
