= Edward F. McDonald =

American politician

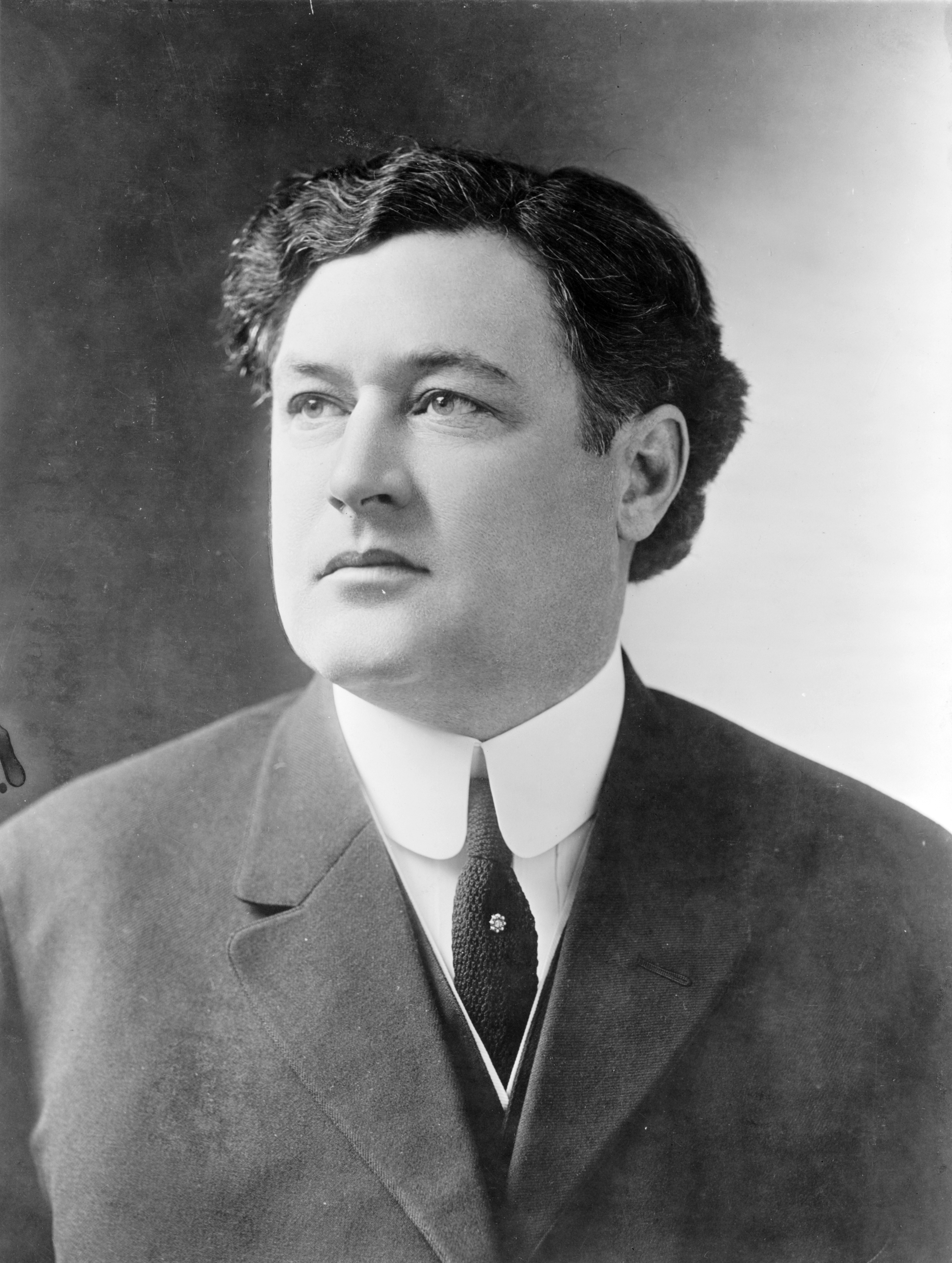

Member of the U.S. House of Representatives from New Jersey's 7th district
- In office March 4, 1891 – November 5, 1892
- Preceded by: William McAdoo
- Succeeded by: George B. Fielder

Personal details
- Born: Edward Francis McDonald; September 21, 1844 Ireland
- Died: November 5, 1892 (aged 48) Harrison, New Jersey
- Party: Democratic Party

Edward Francis McDonald (September 21, 1844 – November 5, 1892) was an American Democratic Party politician who represented New Jersey's 7th congressional district in the United States House of Representatives from 1891 to 1892.

== Life and career ==
McDonald was born in Ireland on September 21, 1844, and immigrated to the United States when six years of age with his parents, who settled in Newark, New Jersey and attended the Newark Public Schools. During the Civil War, he enlisted in Company I, Seventh Regiment, New Jersey Volunteer Infantry, in 1861, and was honorably discharged in 1862. He learned the machinist trade and became a skilled mechanic. He moved to Harrison, New Jersey in 1874. He was a member of the New Jersey General Assembly in 1874, and director at large of the Board of Chosen Freeholders of Hudson County in 1877, and was reelected in 1879 and served four years. He presented credentials as a member-elect to the New Jersey Senate in 1890 and served throughout the session until the last day, when he was unseated, but was restored to the seat in the following session. He was interested in real estate business. He served as treasurer of Harrison in 1881.

McDonald was elected as a Democrat to the Fifty-second Congress and served from March 4, 1891, until his death in Harrison on November 5, 1892, just a few days before the Congressional election. He was interred in Holy Sepulchre Cemetery in East Orange, New Jersey.

== See also ==
- List of members of the United States Congress who died in office (1790–1899)

U.S. House of Representatives
Preceded by William McAdoo	Member of the U.S. House of Representatives from New Jersey's 7th congressional district March 4, 1891–November 5, 1892	Succeeded by George Bragg Fielder
