= List of former United States representatives (D) =

This is a complete list of former United States representatives whose last names begin with the letter D.

== Number of years and terms the member has served ==
The number of years the representative/delegate has served in Congress indicates the number of terms the representative/delegate has. Note the representative/delegate can also serve non-consecutive terms if the representative/delegate loses election and wins re-election to the House.

- 2 years - 1 or 2 terms
- 4 years - 2 or 3 terms
- 6 years - 3 or 4 terms
- 8 years - 4 or 5 terms
- 10 years - 5 or 6 terms
- 12 years - 6 or 7 terms
- 14 years - 7 or 8 terms
- 16 years - 8 or 9 terms
- 18 years - 9 or 10 terms
- 20 years - 10 or 11 terms
- 22 years - 11 or 12 terms
- 24 years - 12 or 13 terms
- 26 years - 13 or 14 terms
- 28 years - 14 or 15 terms
- 30 years - 15 or 16 terms
- 32 years - 16 or 17 terms
- 34 years - 17 or 18 terms
- 36 years - 18 or 19 terms
- 38 years - 19 or 20 terms
- 40 years - 20 or 21 terms
- 42 years - 21 or 22 terms
- 44 years - 22 or 23 terms
- 46 years - 23 or 24 terms
- 48 years - 24 or 25 terms
- 50 years - 25 or 26 terms
- 52 years - 26 or 27 terms
- 54 years - 27 or 28 terms
- 56 years - 28 or 29 terms
- 58 years - 29 or 30 terms

Name	Term	State/ Territory	Party	Lifespan
Thomas D'Alesandro Jr.	1939–1947	Maryland	Democratic	1903–1987
Norman D'Amours	1975–1985	New Hampshire	Democratic	1937–present
Anthony D'Esposito	2023–2025	New York	Republican	1982–present
Wesley A. D'Ewart	1945–1955	Montana	Republican	1889–1973
Emilio Daddario	1959–1971	Connecticut	Democratic	1918–2010
Rollin M. Daggett	1879–1881	Nevada	Republican	1831–1901
Paul B. Dague	1947–1966	Pennsylvania	Republican	1898–1974
Herman B. Dahle	1899–1903	Wisconsin	Republican	1855–1920
Kathy Dahlkemper	2009–2011	Pennsylvania	Democratic	1957–present
Samuel Gordon Daily	1860–1865	Nebraska	Republican	1823–1866
Steve Daines	2013–2015	Montana	Republican	1962–present
Harry H. Dale	1913–1919	New York	Democratic	1868–1935
Porter H. Dale	1915–1923	Vermont	Republican	1867–1933
Thomas H. Dale	1905–1907	Pennsylvania	Republican	1846–1912
Frederick W. Dallinger	1915–1925; 1926–1932	Massachusetts	Republican	1871–1955
J. Burrwood Daly	1935–1939	Pennsylvania	Democratic	1872–1939
William D. Daly	1899–1900	New Jersey	Democratic	1851–1900
John Dalzell	1887–1913	Pennsylvania	Republican	1845–1927
William S. Damrell	1855–1857	Massachusetts	American	1809–1860
William S. Damrell	1857–1859	Massachusetts	Republican	1809–1860
Amasa Dana	1839–1841; 1843–1845	New York	Democratic	1792–1867
Samuel Dana	1814–1815	Massachusetts	Democratic-Republican	1767–1835
Samuel W. Dana	1797–1810	Connecticut	Federalist	1760–1830
Joseph Dane	1820–1823	Maine	Federalist	1778–1858
Lorenzo Danford	1873–1879; 1895–1899	Ohio	Republican	1829–1899
Henry G. Danforth	1911–1917	New York	Republican	1854–1918
Dan Daniel	1969–1988	Virginia	Democratic	1914–1988
Henry Daniel	1827–1833	Kentucky	Democratic	1786–1873
John Reeves Jones Daniel	1841–1853	North Carolina	Democratic	1802–1868
John W. Daniel	1885–1887	Virginia	Democratic	1842–1910
Robert Daniel	1973–1983	Virginia	Republican	1936–2012
Warren F. Daniell	1891–1893	New Hampshire	Democratic	1826–1913
Charles Daniels	1893–1897	New York	Republican	1825–1897
Dominick V. Daniels	1959–1977	New Jersey	Democratic	1908–1987
Milton J. Daniels	1903–1905	California	Republican	1838–1914
George E. Danielson	1971–1982	California	Democratic	1915–1998
William Dannemeyer	1979–1993	California	Republican	1929–2019
Joel Buchanan Danner	1850–1851	Pennsylvania	Democratic	1804–1885
Pat Danner	1993–2001	Missouri	Democratic	1934–present
Ezra Darby	1805–1808	New Jersey	Democratic-Republican	1768–1808
John Fletcher Darby	1851–1853	Missouri	Whig	1803–1882
Colgate Darden	1933–1937; 1939–1941	Virginia	Democratic	1897–1981
Buddy Darden	1983–1995	Georgia	Democratic	1943–present
Edmund S. Dargan	1845–1847	Alabama	Democratic	1805–1879
George W. Dargan	1883–1891	South Carolina	Democratic	1841–1898
Mason C. Darling	1848–1849	Wisconsin	Democratic	1801–1866
William Augustus Darling	1865–1867	New York	Republican	1817–1895
Edward Darlington	1833–1839	Pennsylvania	Anti-Masonic	1795–1884
Isaac Darlington	1817–1819	Pennsylvania	Federalist	1781–1839
Smedley Darlington	1887–1891	Pennsylvania	Republican	1827–1899
William Darlington	1815–1817; 1819–1823	Pennsylvania	Democratic-Republican	1782–1863
Archibald B. Darragh	1901–1909	Michigan	Republican	1840–1927
Cornelius Darragh	1844–1847	Pennsylvania	Whig	1809–1854
Chester Bidwell Darrall	1869–1878; 1881–1883	Louisiana	Republican	1842–1908
George P. Darrow	1915–1937; 1939–1941	Pennsylvania	Republican	1859–1943
Tom Daschle	1979–1987	South Dakota	Democratic	1947–present
Hal Daub	1981–1989	Nebraska	Republican	1941–present
James A. Daugherty	1911–1913	Missouri	Democratic	1847–1920
Ralph Hunter Daughton	1944–1947	Virginia	Democratic	1885–1958
Thomas Davee	1837–1841	Maine	Democratic	1797–1841
Franklin Davenport	1799–1801	New Jersey	Federalist	1755–1832
Frederick M. Davenport	1925–1933	New York	Republican	1866–1956
Harry J. Davenport	1949–1951	Pennsylvania	Democratic	1902–1977
Ira Davenport	1885–1889	New York	Republican	1841–1904
James Davenport	1796–1797	Connecticut	Federalist	1758–1797
James S. Davenport	1907–1909; 1911–1917	Oklahoma	Democratic	1864–1940
John Davenport	1799–1817	Connecticut	Federalist	1752–1830
John Davenport	1827–1829	Ohio	National Republican	1788–1855
Samuel Arza Davenport	1897–1901	Pennsylvania	Republican	1834–1911
Stanley W. Davenport	1899–1901	Pennsylvania	Democratic	1861–1921
Thomas Davenport	1825–1833	Virginia	Democratic	1???–1838
Thomas Davenport	1833–1835	Virginia	National Republican	1???–1838
Martin L. Davey	1918–1921; 1923–1929	Ohio	Democratic	1884–1946
Robert C. Davey	1893–1895; 1897–1908	Louisiana	Democratic	1853–1908
Alexander C. Davidson	1885–1889	Alabama	Democratic	1826–1897
Irwin D. Davidson	1955–1956	New York	Democratic-Liberal	1906–1981
James H. Davidson	1897–1913; 1917–1918	Wisconsin	Republican	1858–1918
Robert H. M. Davidson	1877–1891	Florida	Democratic	1832–1908
Thomas G. Davidson	1855–1861	Louisiana	Democratic	1805–1883
William Davidson	1818–1821	North Carolina	Federalist	1778–1857
Edward Davies	1837–1841	Pennsylvania	Anti-Masonic	1779–1853
John C. Davies II	1949–1951	New York	Democratic	1920–2002
Alexander Davis	1873–1874	Virginia	Democratic	1833–1889
Amos Davis	1833–1835	Kentucky	National Republican	1794–1835
Artur Davis	2003–2011	Alabama	Democratic	1967–present
Charles Russell Davis	1903–1925	Minnesota	Republican	1849–1930
Clifford Davis	1940–1965	Tennessee	Democratic	1897–1970
James H. Davis	1915–1917	Texas	Democratic	1853–1940
David Davis	2007–2009	Tennessee	Republican	1959–present
Ewin L. Davis	1919–1933	Tennessee	Democratic	1876–1949
Garrett Davis	1839–1847	Kentucky	Whig	1801–1872
Geoff Davis	2005–2012	Kentucky	Republican	1958–present
George R. Davis	1879–1885	Illinois	Republican	1840–1899
George T. Davis	1851–1853	Massachusetts	Whig	1810–1877
Glenn Robert Davis	1947–1957; 1965–1974	Wisconsin	Republican	1914–1988
Henry Winter Davis	1855–1861	Maryland	American	1817–1865
Henry Winter Davis	1863–1865	Maryland	Unconditional Unionist	1817–1865
Horace Davis	1877–1881	California	Republican	1831–1916
Jack Davis	1987–1989	Illinois	Republican	1935–2018
Jacob C. Davis	1856–1857	Illinois	Democratic	1820–1883
Jacob E. Davis	1941–1943	Ohio	Democratic	1905–2003
James C. Davis	1947–1963	Georgia	Democratic	1895–1981
Jefferson Davis	1845–1846	Mississippi	Democratic	1808–1889
Jim Davis	1997–2007	Florida	Democratic	1957–present
Jo Ann Davis	2001–2007	Virginia	Republican	1950–2007
John Davis	1825–1834	Massachusetts	National Republican	1787–1854
John Davis	1839–1841	Pennsylvania	Democratic	1788–1878
John Davis	1891–1895	Kansas	Populist	1826–1901
John G. Davis	1851–1855; 1857–1859	Indiana	Democratic	1810–1866
John G. Davis	1859–1861	Indiana	Anti-Lecompton Democratic	1810–1866
John James Davis	1871–1873	West Virginia	Democratic	1835–1916
John James Davis	1873–1875	West Virginia	Independent Democrat	1835–1916
John W. Davis	1911–1913	West Virginia	Democratic	1873–1955
John Wesley Davis	1835–1837; 1839–1841; 1843–1847	Indiana	Democratic	1799–1859
John William Davis	1961–1975	Georgia	Democratic	1916–1992
Joseph J. Davis	1875–1881	North Carolina	Democratic	1828–1892
Lincoln Davis	2003–2011	Tennessee	Democratic	1943–present
Lowndes Henry Davis	1879–1885	Missouri	Democratic	1836–1920
Mendel Jackson Davis	1971–1981	South Carolina	Democratic	1942–2007
Noah Davis	1869–1870	New York	Republican	1818–1902
Reuben Davis	1857–1861	Mississippi	Democratic	1813–1890
Richard D. Davis	1841–1845	New York	Democratic	1799–1871
Robert Lee Davis	1932–1933	Pennsylvania	Republican	1893–1967
Robert T. Davis	1883–1889	Massachusetts	Republican	1823–1906
Bob Davis	1979–1993	Michigan	Republican	1932–2009
Robert Wyche Davis	1897–1905	Florida	Democratic	1849–1929
Rodney Davis	2013–2023	Illinois	Republican	1970–present
Roger Davis	1811–1815	Pennsylvania	Democratic-Republican	1762–1815
Samuel Davis	1813–1815	Massachusetts	Federalist	1774–1831
Susan Davis	2001–2021	California	Democratic	1944–present
Thomas Davis	1853–1855	Rhode Island	Democratic	1806–1895
Thomas Beall Davis	1905–1907	West Virginia	Democratic	1828–1911
Tom Davis	1995–2008	Virginia	Republican	1949–present
Thomas Terry Davis	1797–1803	Kentucky	Democratic-Republican	17??–1807
Thomas Treadwell Davis	1863–1865	New York	Unionist	1810–1872
Thomas Treadwell Davis	1865–1867	New York	Republican	1810–1872
Timothy Davis	1855–1857	Massachusetts	American	1821–1888
Timothy Davis	1857–1859	Massachusetts	Republican	1821–1888
Timothy Davis	1857–1859	Iowa	Republican	1794–1872
Warren R. Davis	1827–1831	South Carolina	Democratic	1793–1835
Warren R. Davis	1831–1835	South Carolina	Nullifier	1793–1835
William Morris Davis	1861–1863	Pennsylvania	Republican	1815–1891
George M. Davison	1897–1899	Kentucky	Republican	1855–1912
John M. Davy	1875–1877	New York	Republican	1835–1909
Beman Gates Dawes	1905–1909	Ohio	Republican	1870–1953
Henry L. Dawes	1857–1875	Massachusetts	Republican	1816–1903
Rufus Dawes	1881–1883	Ohio	Republican	1838–1899
Albert F. Dawson	1905–1911	Iowa	Republican	1872–1949
John Dawson	1797–1814	Virginia	Democratic-Republican	1762–1814
John Bennett Dawson	1841–1845	Louisiana	Democratic	1798–1845
John Littleton Dawson	1851–1855; 1863–1867	Pennsylvania	Democratic	1813–1870
William Dawson	1885–1887	Missouri	Democratic	1848–1929
William A. Dawson	1947–1949; 1953–1959	Utah	Republican	1903–1981
William C. Dawson	1836–1841	Georgia	Whig	1798–1856
William Johnston Dawson	1793–1795	North Carolina	Anti-Administration	1765–1796
William L. Dawson	1943–1970	Illinois	Democratic	1886–1970
Rowland Day	1823–1825	New York	Democratic-Republican	1779–1853
Rowland Day	1833–1835	New York	Democratic	1779–1853
Stephen A. Day	1941–1945	Illinois	Republican	1882–1950
Timothy C. Day	1855–1857	Ohio	Oppositionist	1819–1869
Charles Dayan	1831–1833	New York	Democratic	1792–1877
Alston G. Dayton	1895–1905	West Virginia	Republican	1857–1920
Jonathan Dayton	1791–1795	New Jersey	Pro-Administration	1760–1824
Jonathan Dayton	1795–1799	New Jersey	Federalist	1760–1824
David A. De Armond	1891–1909	Missouri	Democratic	1844–1909
Rezin A. De Bolt	1875–1877	Missouri	Democratic	1828–1891
Henry S. De Forest	1911–1913	New York	Republican	1847–1917
Robert E. De Forest	1891–1895	Connecticut	Democratic	1845–1924
John I. De Graff	1827–1829; 1837–1839	New York	Democratic	1783–1848
Reese C. De Graffenreid	1897–1902	Texas	Democratic	1859–1902
John J. De Haven	1889–1890	California	Republican	1849–1913
Daniel De Jarnette	1859–1861	Virginia	Independent Democrat	1822–1881
Kika de la Garza	1965–1997	Texas	Democratic	1927–2017
Gilbert De La Matyr	1879–1881	Indiana	Greenbacker	1825–1892
James De La Montanya	1839–1841	New York	Democratic	1798–1849
Hugh De Lacy	1945–1947	Washington	Democratic	1910–1986
Milton De Lano	1887–1891	New York	Republican	1844–1922
Robert C. De Large	1871–1873	South Carolina	Republican	1842–1874
Ron de Lugo	1973–1979; 1981–1995	U.S. Virgin Islands	Democratic	1930–2020
John De Mott	1845–1847	New York	Democratic	1790–1870
Mark L. De Motte	1881–1883	Indiana	Republican	1832–1908
Peter J. De Muth	1937–1939	Pennsylvania	Democratic	1892–1993
Oscar De Priest	1929–1935	Illinois	Republican	1871–1951
René L. De Rouen	1927–1941	Louisiana	Democratic	1874–1942
Jaime C. de Veyra	1917–1923	Philippines	Nacionalista	1873–1963
Marion De Vries	1897–1900	California	Democratic	1865–1939
Alexander De Witt	1853–1855	Massachusetts	Free Soiler	1798–1879
Alexander De Witt	1855–1857	Massachusetts	American	1798–1879
Charles G. DeWitt	1829–1831	New York	Democratic	1789–1839
David M. De Witt	1873–1875	New York	Democratic	1837–1912
Francis B. De Witt	1895–1897	Ohio	Republican	1849–1929
Jacob H. De Witt	1819–1821	New York	Democratic-Republican	1784–1857
Joseph T. Deal	1921–1929	Virginia	Democratic	1860–1942
Nathan Deal	1993–1997	Georgia	Democratic	1942–present
Nathan Deal	1997–2010	Georgia	Republican	1942–present
Benjamin Dean	1878–1879	Massachusetts	Democratic	1824–1897
Ezra Dean	1841–1845	Ohio	Democratic	1795–1872
Gilbert Dean	1851–1854	New York	Democratic	1819–1870
Josiah Dean	1807–1809	Massachusetts	Democratic-Republican	1748–1818
Sidney Dean	1855–1857	Connecticut	American	1818–1901
Sidney Dean	1857–1859	Connecticut	Republican	1818–1901
Charles B. Deane	1947–1957	North Carolina	Democratic	1898–1969
Cleveland Dear	1933–1937	Louisiana	Democratic	1888–1950
Henry Dearborn	1793–1795	Massachusetts	Anti-Administration	1751–1829
Henry Dearborn	1795–1797	Massachusetts	Democratic-Republican	1751–1829
Henry Alexander Scammell Dearborn	1831–1833	Massachusetts	National Republican	1783–1851
Edmund Deberry	1829–1831; 1833–1837	North Carolina	National Republican	1787–1859
Edmund Deberry	1837–1845; 1849–1851	North Carolina	Whig	1787–1859
H. Joel Deckard	1979–1983	Indiana	Republican	1942–2016
Perl D. Decker	1913–1919	Missouri	Democratic	1875–1934
Elias Deemer	1901–1907	Pennsylvania	Republican	1838–1918
Braswell Deen	1933–1939	Georgia	Democratic	1893–1981
Nathaniel Cobb Deering	1877–1883	Iowa	Republican	1827–1887
Peter DeFazio	1987–2023	Oregon	Democratic	1947–present
Joseph H. Defrees	1865–1867	Indiana	Republican	1812–1885
Edward Degener	1870–1871	Texas	Republican	1809–1890
Federico Degetau	1901–1905	Puerto Rico	Republican	1862–1914
Edward deGraffenried	1949–1953	Alabama	Democratic	1899–1974
Frederick Simpson Deitrick	1913–1915	Massachusetts	Democratic	1875–1948
Bill Delahunt	1997–2011	Massachusetts	Democratic	1941–2024
James J. Delaney	1945–1947; 1949–1978	New York	Democratic	1901–1987
John Delaney	2013–2019	Maryland	Democratic	1963–present
John J. Delaney	1918–1919; 1931–1948	New York	Democratic	1878–1948
Charles Delano	1859–1863	Massachusetts	Republican	1820–1883
Columbus Delano	1845–1847	Ohio	Whig	1809–1896
Columbus Delano	1865–1867; 1868–1869	Ohio	Republican	1809–1896
Isaac C. Delaplaine	1861–1863	New York	Democratic	1817–1866
Tom DeLay	1985–2006	Texas	Republican	1947–present
Antonio Delgado	2019–2022	New York	Democratic	1977–present
Francisco Afan Delgado	1935–1936	Philippines	Nacionalista	1886–1964
Vincent J. Dellay	1957	New Jersey	Republican	1907–1999
Vincent J. Dellay	1957–1959	New Jersey	Democratic	1907–1999
John R. Dellenback	1967–1975	Oregon	Republican	1918–2002
James Dellet	1839–1841; 1843–1845	Alabama	Whig	1788–1848
Ron Dellums	1971–1998	California	Democratic	1935–2018
Benjamin F. Deming	1833–1834	Vermont	Anti-Masonic	1790–1834
Henry C. Deming	1863–1867	Connecticut	Republican	1815–1872
Val Demings	2017–2023	Florida	Democratic	1957–present
Jim DeMint	1999–2005	South Carolina	Republican	1951–present
John J. Dempsey	1935–1941; 1951–1958	New Mexico	Democratic	1879–1958
S. Wallace Dempsey	1915–1931	New York	Republican	1862–1949
Lawrence J. DeNardis	1981–1983	Connecticut	Republican	1938–2018
Edwin Denby	1905–1911	Michigan	Republican	1870–1929
Jeff Denham	2011–2019	California	Republican	1967–present
Frank E. Denholm	1971–1975	South Dakota	Democratic	1923–2016
Charles Denison	1863–1867	Pennsylvania	Democratic	1818–1867
Dudley Chase Denison	1875–1877	Vermont	Independent Republican	1819–1905
Dudley Chase Denison	1877–1879	Vermont	Republican	1819–1905
Edward E. Denison	1915–1931	Illinois	Republican	1873–1953
George Denison	1819–1823	Pennsylvania	Democratic-Republican	1790–1831
Robert Vernon Denney	1967–1971	Nebraska	Republican	1916–1981
William Denning	1809–1810	New York	Democratic-Republican	1740–1819
David W. Dennis	1969–1975	Indiana	Republican	1912–1999
John Dennis	1797–1805	Maryland	Federalist	1771–1806
John Dennis	1837–1841	Maryland	Whig	1807–1859
Littleton Purnell Dennis	1833–1834	Maryland	National Republican	1786–1834
David S. Dennison Jr.	1957–1959	Ohio	Republican	1918–2001
Arthur A. Denny	1865–1867	Washington	Republican	1822–1899
Harmar Denny	1829–1837	Pennsylvania	Anti-Masonic	1794–1852
Harmar D. Denny Jr.	1951–1953	Pennsylvania	Republican	1886–1966
James William Denny	1899–1901; 1903–1905	Maryland	Democratic	1838–1923
Walter M. Denny	1895–1897	Mississippi	Democratic	1853–1926
Peter Denoyelles	1813–1815	New York	Democratic-Republican	1766–1829
William H. Denson	1893–1895	Alabama	Democratic	1846–1906
Charlie Dent	2005–2018	Pennsylvania	Republican	1960–present
George Dent	1793–1795	Maryland	Pro-Administration	1756–1813
George Dent	1795–1801	Maryland	Federalist	1756–1813
John Herman Dent	1958–1979	Pennsylvania	Democratic	1908–1988
S. Hubert Dent Jr.	1909–1921	Alabama	Democratic	1869–1938
William Dent	1853–1855	Georgia	Democratic	1806–1855
George K. Denton	1917–1919	Indiana	Democratic	1864–1926
Winfield K. Denton	1949–1953; 1955–1966	Indiana	Democratic	1896–1971
James W. Denver	1855–1857	California	Democratic	1817–1892
Matthew Denver	1907–1913	Ohio	Democratic	1870–1954
Steven Derounian	1953–1965	New York	Republican	1918–2007
Butler Derrick	1975–1995	South Carolina	Democratic	1936–2014
Franklin Lewis Dershem	1913–1915	Pennsylvania	Democratic	1865–1950
Ed Derwinski	1959–1983	Illinois	Republican	1926–2012
Ron DeSantis	2013–2018	Florida	Republican	1978–present
Joseph Desha	1807–1819	Kentucky	Democratic-Republican	1768–1842
Robert Desha	1827–1831	Tennessee	Democratic	1791–1849
Peter V. Deuster	1879–1885	Wisconsin	Democratic	1831–1904
Ted Deutch	2010–2022	Florida	Democratic	1966–present
Peter Deutsch	1993–2005	Florida	Democratic	1957–present
James Devereux	1951–1959	Maryland	Republican	1903–1988
Samuel L. Devine	1959–1981	Ohio	Republican	1915–1997
Edward Devitt	1947–1949	Minnesota	Republican	1911–1992
Arthur Granville Dewalt	1915–1921	Pennsylvania	Democratic	1854–1931
Lewis Dewart	1831–1833	Pennsylvania	Democratic	1780–1852
William Lewis Dewart	1857–1859	Pennsylvania	Democratic	1821–1888
John T. Deweese	1868–1870	North Carolina	Republican	1835–1906
Charles S. Dewey	1941–1945	Illinois	Republican	1880–1980
Daniel Dewey	1813–1814	Massachusetts	Federalist	1766–1815
Mike DeWine	1983–1991	Ohio	Republican	1947–present
Samuel Dexter	1793–1795	Massachusetts	Pro-Administration	1761–1816
John F. Dezendorf	1881–1883	Virginia	Republican	1834–1894
Lincoln Díaz-Balart	1993–2011	Florida	Republican	1954–2025
Samuel Dibble	1881–1882; 1883–1891	South Carolina	Democratic	1837–1913
George Gibbs Dibrell	1875–1885	Tennessee	Democratic	1822–1888
Charles W. F. Dick	1898–1904	Ohio	Republican	1858–1945
John Dick	1853–1855	Pennsylvania	Whig	1794–1872
John Dick	1855–1857	Pennsylvania	Oppositionist	1794–1872
John Dick	1857–1859	Pennsylvania	Republican	1794–1872
Samuel Bernard Dick	1879–1881	Pennsylvania	Republican	1836–1907
Samuel Dickens	1816–1817	North Carolina	Democratic-Republican	died 1840
Charles Heber Dickerman	1903–1905	Pennsylvania	Democratic	1843–1915
Philemon Dickerson	1833–1836; 1839–1841	New Jersey	Democratic	1788–1862
William Worth Dickerson	1890–1893	Kentucky	Democratic	1851–1923
Henry L. Dickey	1877–1881	Ohio	Democratic	1832–1910
Jay Dickey	1993–2001	Arkansas	Republican	1939−2017
Jesse C. Dickey	1849–1851	Pennsylvania	Whig	1808–1891
John Dickey	1843–1845; 1847–1849	Pennsylvania	Whig	1794–1853
Oliver James Dickey	1868–1873	Pennsylvania	Republican	1823–1876
Clement C. Dickinson	1910–1921; 1923–1929; 1931–1935	Missouri	Democratic	1849–1938
David W. Dickinson	1833–1835	Tennessee	Democratic	1808–1845
David W. Dickinson	1843–1845	Tennessee	Whig	1808–1845
Edward Dickinson	1853–1855	Massachusetts	Whig	1803–1874
Edward F. Dickinson	1869–1871	Ohio	Democratic	1829–1891
John Dean Dickinson	1819–1823	New York	Federalist	1767–1841
John Dean Dickinson	1827–1831	New York	National Republican	1767–1841
L. J. Dickinson	1919–1931	Iowa	Republican	1873–1968
Rodolphus Dickinson	1847–1849	Ohio	Democratic	1797–1849
William L. Dickinson	1965–1993	Alabama	Republican	1925–2008
Norm Dicks	1977–2013	Washington	Democratic	1940–present
David C. Dickson	1835–1836	Mississippi	National Republican	1794–1836
Frank S. Dickson	1905–1907	Illinois	Republican	1876–1953
John Dickson	1831–1835	New York	Anti-Masonic	1783–1852
Joseph Dickson	1799–1801	North Carolina	Federalist	1745–1825
Samuel Dickson	1855–1857	New York	Oppositionist	1807–1858
William Dickson	1801–1807	Tennessee	Democratic-Republican	1770–1816
William A. Dickson	1909–1913	Mississippi	Democratic	1861–1940
Samuel Dickstein	1923–1945	New York	Democratic	1885–1954
Gerrit J. Diekema	1907–1911	Michigan	Republican	1859–1930
Martin Dies Sr.	1909–1919	Texas	Democratic	1870–1922
Martin Dies Jr.	1931–1945; 1953–1959	Texas	Democratic	1900–1972
William H. Dieterich	1931–1933	Illinois	Democratic	1876–1940
Charles E. Dietrich	1935–1937	Pennsylvania	Democratic	1889–1942
William Dietz	1825–1827	New York	Democratic	1778–1848
Robert E. Difenderfer	1911–1915	Pennsylvania	Democratic	1849–1923
Charles Diggs	1955–1980	Michigan	Democratic	1922–1998
Clarence Dill	1915–1919	Washington	Democratic	1884–1978
Paul Dillingham	1843–1847	Vermont	Democratic	1799–1891
Charles Hall Dillon	1913–1919	South Dakota	Republican	1853–1929
LaVern Dilweg	1943–1945	Wisconsin	Democratic	1903–1968
Milo Melankthon Dimmick	1849–1853	Pennsylvania	Democratic	1811–1872
William Harrison Dimmick	1857–1861	Pennsylvania	Democratic	1815–1861
Davis Dimock Jr.	1841–1842	Pennsylvania	Democratic	1801–1842
Anthony Dimond	1933–1945	Alaska	Democratic	1881–1953
John Dingell Sr.	1933–1955	Michigan	Democratic	1894–1955
John Dingell	1955–2015	Michigan	Democratic	1926–2019
Nelson Dingley Jr.	1881–1899	Maine	Republican	1832–1899
Samuel Dinsmoor	1811–1813	New Hampshire	Democratic-Republican	1766–1835
Hugh A. Dinsmore	1893–1905	Arkansas	Democratic	1850–1930
Joe DioGuardi	1985–1989	New York	Republican	1940–present
Everett Dirksen	1933–1949	Illinois	Republican	1896–1969
David T. Disney	1849–1855	Ohio	Democratic	1803–1857
Wesley E. Disney	1931–1945	Oklahoma	Democratic	1883–1961
J. William Ditter	1933–1943	Pennsylvania	Republican	1888–1943
Alexander S. Diven	1861–1863	New York	Republican	1809–1896
Henry Aldous Dixon	1955–1961	Utah	Republican	1890–1967
James Dixon	1845–1849	Connecticut	Whig	1814–1873
Joseph Dixon	1870–1871	North Carolina	Republican	1828–1883
Joseph A. Dixon	1937–1939	Ohio	Democratic	1879–1942
Joseph M. Dixon	1903–1907	Montana	Republican	1867–1934
Julian Dixon	1979–2000	California	Democratic	1934–2000
Lincoln Dixon	1905–1919	Indiana	Democratic	1860–1932
Nathan F. Dixon II	1849–1851	Rhode Island	Whig	1812–1881
Nathan F. Dixon II	1863–1871	Rhode Island	Republican	1812–1881
Nathan F. Dixon III	1885	Rhode Island	Republican	1847–1897
William W. Dixon	1891–1893	Montana	Democratic	1838–1910
Charles Djou	2010–2011	Hawaii	Republican	1970–present
Robert E. Doan	1891–1893	Ohio	Republican	1831–1919
William Doan	1839–1843	Ohio	Democratic	1792–1847
James C. Dobbin	1845–1847	North Carolina	Democratic	1814–1857
Donald C. Dobbins	1933–1937	Illinois	Democratic	1878–1943
Samuel A. Dobbins	1873–1877	New Jersey	Republican	1814–1886
Alexander Monroe Dockery	1883–1899	Missouri	Democratic	1845–1926
Alfred Dockery	1845–1847; 1851–1853	North Carolina	Whig	1797–1875
Oliver H. Dockery	1868–1871	North Carolina	Republican	1830–1906
John F. Dockweiler	1933–1939	California	Democratic	1895–1943
Chris Dodd	1975–1981	Connecticut	Democratic	1944–present
Edward Dodd	1855–1857	New York	Oppositionist	1805–1891
Edward Dodd	1857–1859	New York	Republican	1805–1891
Thomas J. Dodd	1953–1957	Connecticut	Democratic	1907–1971
Philip Doddridge	1829–1832	Virginia	National Republican	1773–1832
Francis H. Dodds	1909–1913	Michigan	Republican	1858–1940
Ozro J. Dodds	1872–1873	Ohio	Democratic	1840–1882
Augustus C. Dodge	1840–1846	Iowa	Democratic	1812–1883
Grenville M. Dodge	1867–1869	Iowa	Republican	1831–1916
Henry Dodge	1841–1845	Wisconsin	Democratic	1782–1867
William E. Dodge	1866–1867	New York	Republican	1805–1883
Nicholas B. Doe	1840–1841	New York	Whig	1786–1856
Andrew W. Doig	1839–1843	New York	Democratic	1799–1875
Bob Dold	2011–2013; 2015–2017	Illinois	Republican	1969–present
Bob Dole	1961–1969	Kansas	Republican	1923–2021
Isidore Dollinger	1949–1959	New York	Democratic	1903–2000
James I. Dolliver	1945–1957	Iowa	Republican	1894–1978
Jonathan P. Dolliver	1889–1900	Iowa	Republican	1858–1910
James R. Domengeaux	1941–1944; 1944–1949	Louisiana	Democratic	1907–1988
Frederick H. Dominick	1917–1933	South Carolina	Democratic	1877–1960
Peter H. Dominick	1961–1963	Colorado	Republican	1915–1981
George Anthony Dondero	1933–1957	Michigan	Republican	1883–1968
Joseph Benton Donley	1869–1871	Pennsylvania	Republican	1838–1917
William G. Donnan	1871–1875	Iowa	Republican	1834–1908
Richard Spaight Donnell	1847–1849	North Carolina	Whig	1820–1867
Brian J. Donnelly	1979–1993	Massachusetts	Democratic	1946–2023
Ignatius L. Donnelly	1863–1869	Minnesota	Republican	1831–1901
Joe Donnelly	2007–2013	Indiana	Democratic	1955–present
Michael Donohoe	1911–1915	Pennsylvania	Democratic	1864–1958
Harold Donohue	1947–1974	Massachusetts	Democratic	1901–1984
Dan Donovan	2015–2019	New York	Republican	1956–present
Dennis D. Donovan	1891–1895	Ohio	Democratic	1859–1941
James G. Donovan	1951–1957	New York	Democratic	1898–1987
Jeremiah Donovan	1913–1915	Connecticut	Democratic	1857–1935
Jerome F. Donovan	1918–1921	New York	Democratic	1872–1949
Cal Dooley	1991–2005	California	Democratic	1954–present
Edwin B. Dooley	1957–1963	New York	Republican	1905–1982
Peter J. Dooling	1913–1921	New York	Democratic	1857–1931
Dudley Doolittle	1913–1919	Kansas	Democratic	1881–1957
John Doolittle	1991–2009	California	Republican	1950–present
William H. Doolittle	1893–1897	Washington	Republican	1848–1914
Frank Ellsworth Doremus	1911–1921	Michigan	Democratic	1865–1947
Byron Dorgan	1981–1992	North Dakota	Democratic	1942–present
Francis E. Dorn	1953–1961	New York	Republican	1911–1987
William Jennings Bryan Dorn	1947–1949; 1951–1974	South Carolina	Democratic	1916–2005
Bob Dornan	1977–1983; 1985–1997	California	Republican	1933–present
Charles Dorr	1897–1899	West Virginia	Republican	1852–1914
Clement Dorsey	1825–1831	Maryland	National Republican	1778–1848
Frank J. G. Dorsey	1935–1939	Pennsylvania	Democratic	1891–1949
George Washington Emery Dorsey	1885–1891	Nebraska	Republican	1842–1911
John Lloyd Dorsey Jr.	1930–1931	Kentucky	Democratic	1891–1960
William Dorsheimer	1883–1885	New York	Democratic	1832–1888
James Duane Doty	1839–1841; 1849–1851	Wisconsin	Democratic	1799–1865
James Duane Doty	1851–1853	Wisconsin	Independent Democrat	1799–1865
Ulysses F. Doubleday	1831–1833; 1835–1837	New York	Democratic	1792–1866
Charles Dougherty	1885–1889	Florida	Democratic	1850–1915
Charles F. Dougherty	1979–1983	Pennsylvania	Republican	1937–present
John Dougherty	1899–1905	Missouri	Democratic	1857–1905
Robert L. Doughton	1911–1953	North Carolina	Democratic	1863–1954
Albert Douglas	1907–1911	Ohio	Republican	1852–1935
Beverly B. Douglas	1875–1878	Virginia	Democratic	1822–1878
Chuck Douglas	1989–1991	New Hampshire	Republican	1942–present
Emily Taft Douglas	1945–1947	Illinois	Democratic	1899–1994
Fred J. Douglas	1937–1945	New York	Republican	1869–1949
Helen Gahagan Douglas	1945–1951	California	Democratic	1900–1980
Lewis Williams Douglas	1927–1933	Arizona	Democratic	1894–1974
Stephen A. Douglas	1843–1847	Illinois	Democratic	1813–1861
William H. Douglas	1901–1905	New York	Republican	1853–1944
John J. Douglass	1925–1935	Massachusetts	Democratic	1873–1939
Isaac Hoffer Doutrich	1927–1937	Pennsylvania	Republican	1871–1941
Blackburn B. Dovener	1895–1907	West Virginia	Republican	1842–1914
John G. Dow	1965–1969; 1971–1973	New York	Democratic	1905–2003
Clement Dowd	1881–1885	North Carolina	Democratic	1832–1898
James F. Dowdell	1853–1859	Alabama	Democratic	1818–1871
Abraham Dowdney	1885–1886	New York	Democratic	1841–1886
John Dowdy	1952–1973	Texas	Democratic	1912–1995
Wayne Dowdy	1981–1989	Mississippi	Democratic	1943–present
Cassius C. Dowell	1915–1935; 1937–1940	Iowa	Republican	1864–1940
Stephen Wheeler Downey	1879–1881	Wyoming	Republican	1839–1902
Thomas Downey	1975–1993	New York	Democratic	1949–present
Charles Downing	1837–1841	Florida	Democratic	died 1841
Finis E. Downing	1895–1896	Illinois	Democratic	1846–1936
Thomas N. Downing	1959–1977	Virginia	Democratic	1919–2001
Le Roy D. Downs	1941–1943	Connecticut	Democratic	1900–1970
Edward Dowse	1819–1820	Massachusetts	Democratic-Republican	1756–1828
Peter M. Dox	1869–1873	Alabama	Democratic	1813–1891
Charles T. Doxey	1883	Indiana	Republican	1841–1898
Wall Doxey	1929–1941	Mississippi	Democratic	1892–1962
Clyde Doyle	1945–1947; 1949–1963	California	Democratic	1887–1963
Mike Doyle	1995–2022	Pennsylvania	Democratic	1953–present
Thomas A. Doyle	1923–1931	Illinois	Democratic	1886–1935
John R. Drake	1817–1819	New York	Democratic-Republican	1782–1857
Thelma Drake	2005–2009	Virginia	Republican	1949–present
Herbert J. Drane	1917–1933	Florida	Democratic	1863–1947
Joseph Draper	1830–1831; 1832–1833	Virginia	Democratic	1794–1834
William Franklin Draper	1893–1897	Massachusetts	Republican	1842–1910
William Henry Draper	1901–1913	New York	Republican	1841–1921
William Drayton	1825–1833	South Carolina	Democratic	1776–1846
David Dreier	1981–2013	California	Republican	1952–present
Solomon Robert Dresser	1903–1907	Pennsylvania	Republican	1842–1911
Ira W. Drew	1937–1939	Pennsylvania	Democratic	1878–1972
Patrick H. Drewry	1920–1947	Virginia	Democratic	1875–1947
Steve Driehaus	2009–2011	Ohio	Democratic	1966–present
Edmund H. Driggs	1897–1901	New York	Democratic	1865–1946
John F. Driggs	1863–1869	Michigan	Republican	1813–1877
Robert Drinan	1971–1981	Massachusetts	Democratic	1920–2007
Daniel A. Driscoll	1909–1917	New York	Democratic	1875–1955
Denis J. Driscoll	1935–1937	Pennsylvania	Democratic	1871–1958
Michael E. Driscoll	1899–1913	New York	Republican	1851–1929
William J. Driver	1921–1939	Arkansas	Democratic	1873–1948
George Dromgoole	1835–1841; 1843–1847	Virginia	Democratic	1797–1847
Dow H. Drukker	1914–1919	New Jersey	Republican	1872–1963
Augustus Drum	1853–1855	Pennsylvania	Democratic	1815–1858
John Duarte	2023–2025	California	Republican	1966–present
Dudley M. DuBose	1871–1873	Georgia	Democratic	1834–1883
Pete du Pont	1971–1977	Delaware	Republican	1935–2021
Fred Dubois	1887–1890	Idaho	Republican	1851–1930
Tammy Duckworth	2013–2017	Illinois	Democratic	1968–present
Edward Bishop Dudley	1829–1831	North Carolina	Democratic	1789–1855
R. Holland Duell	1859–1863; 1871–1875	New York	Republican	1824–1891
William Duer	1847–1851	New York	Whig	1805–1879
Warren J. Duffey	1933–1936	Ohio	Democratic	1886–1936
James P. B. Duffy	1935–1937	New York	Democratic	1878–1969
Sean Duffy	2011–2019	Wisconsin	Republican	1971–present
P. Henry Dugro	1881–1883	New York	Democratic	1855–1920
Richard Thomas Walker Duke	1870–1871	Virginia	Conservative	1822–1898
Richard Thomas Walker Duke	1871–1873	Virginia	Democratic	1822–1898
Thaddeus J. Dulski	1959–1974	New York	Democratic	1915–1988
Ebenezer Dumont	1863–1865	Indiana	Unionist	1814–1871
Ebenezer Dumont	1865–1867	Indiana	Republican	1814–1871
James W. Dunbar	1919–1923; 1929–1931	Indiana	Republican	1860–1943
William Dunbar	1853–1855	Louisiana	Democratic	1805–1861
Alexander Duncan	1837–1841; 1843–1845	Ohio	Democratic	1788–1853
Daniel Duncan	1847–1849	Ohio	Whig	1806–1849
Garnett Duncan	1847–1849	Kentucky	Whig	1800–1875
James Duncan	1821	Pennsylvania	Democratic-Republican	1756–1844
James H. Duncan	1849–1853	Massachusetts	Whig	1793–1869
Jeff Duncan	2011–2025	South Carolina	Republican	1966–present
Jimmy Duncan	1988–2019	Tennessee	Republican	1947–present
John Duncan Sr.	1965–1988	Tennessee	Republican	1919–1988
Joseph Duncan	1827–1834	Illinois	Democratic	1794–1844
Richard M. Duncan	1933–1943	Missouri	Democratic	1889–1974
Robert B. Duncan	1963–1967; 1975–1981	Oregon	Democratic	1920–2011
William Addison Duncan	1883–1884	Pennsylvania	Democratic	1836–1884
James I. Dungan	1891–1893	Ohio	Democratic	1844–1931
Cyrus L. Dunham	1849–1855	Indiana	Democratic	1817–1877
Ransom W. Dunham	1883–1889	Illinois	Republican	1838–1896
George W. Dunlap	1861–1863	Kentucky	Unionist	1813–1880
Robert P. Dunlap	1843–1847	Maine	Democratic	1794–1859
William Claiborne Dunlap	1833–1837	Tennessee	Democratic	1798–1872
Aubert C. Dunn	1935–1937	Mississippi	Democratic	1896–1987
George Grundy Dunn	1847–1849	Indiana	Whig	1812–1857
George Grundy Dunn	1855–1857	Indiana	Oppositionist	1812–1857
George Hedford Dunn	1837–1839	Indiana	Whig	1794–1854
James Whitney Dunn	1981–1983	Michigan	Republican	1943–present
Jennifer Dunn	1993–2005	Washington	Republican	1941–2007
John T. Dunn	1893–1895	New Jersey	Democratic	1838–1907
Matthew A. Dunn	1933–1941	Pennsylvania	Democratic	1886–1942
Poindexter Dunn	1879–1889	Arkansas	Democratic	1834–1914
Thomas B. Dunn	1913–1923	New York	Republican	1853–1924
William McKee Dunn	1859–1863	Indiana	Republican	1814–1887
Mark H. Dunnell	1871–1883; 1889–1891	Minnesota	Republican	1823–1904
Edward J. Dunphy	1889–1895	New York	Democratic	1856–1926
Charles T. Dunwell	1903–1908	New York	Republican	1852–1908
H. Garland Dupré	1910–1924	Louisiana	Democratic	1873–1924
George H. Durand	1875–1877	Michigan	Democratic	1838–1903
Dick Durbin	1983–1997	Illinois	Democratic	1944–present
Allan C. Durborow Jr.	1891–1895	Illinois	Democratic	1857–1908
Daniel Meserve Durell	1807–1809	New Hampshire	Democratic-Republican	1769–1841
Cyrus Durey	1907–1911	New York	Republican	1864–1933
Job Durfee	1821–1825	Rhode Island	Democratic-Republican	1790–1847
Nathan B. Durfee	1855–1857	Rhode Island	American	1812–1872
Nathan B. Durfee	1857–1859	Rhode Island	Republican	1812–1872
George R. Durgan	1933–1935	Indiana	Democratic	1872–1942
Carl T. Durham	1939–1961	North Carolina	Democratic	1892–1974
Milton J. Durham	1873–1879	Kentucky	Democratic	1824–1911
Charles Durkee	1849–1853	Wisconsin	Free Soiler	1805–1870
Edwin Durno	1961–1963	Oregon	Republican	1899–1976
Isaac H. Duval	1869–1871	West Virginia	Republican	1824–1902
William Pope Duval	1813–1815	Kentucky	Democratic-Republican	1784–1854
Gabriel Duvall	1794–1795	Maryland	Anti-Administration	1752–1844
Gabriel Duvall	1795–1796	Maryland	Democratic-Republican	1752–1844
Henry W. Dwight	1821–1825	Massachusetts	Federalist	1788–1845
Henry W. Dwight	1825–1831	Massachusetts	National Republican	1788–1845
Jeremiah W. Dwight	1877–1883	New York	Republican	1819–1885
John Wilbur Dwight	1902–1913	New York	Republican	1859–1928
Theodore Dwight	1806–1807	Connecticut	Federalist	1764–1846
Thomas Dwight	1803–1805	Massachusetts	Federalist	1758–1819
Justin Dwinell	1823–1825	New York	Democratic-Republican	1785–1850
Henry Dworshak	1939–1946	Idaho	Republican	1894–1962
Bernard J. Dwyer	1981–1993	New Jersey	Democratic	1921–1998
Florence P. Dwyer	1957–1973	New Jersey	Republican	1902–1976
Kenneth W. Dyal	1965–1967	California	Democratic	1910–1978
David Patterson Dyer	1869–1871	Missouri	Republican	1838–1924
Leonidas C. Dyer	1911–1914; 1915–1933	Missouri	Republican	1871–1957
Mervyn Dymally	1981–1993	California	Democratic	1926–2012
Roy Dyson	1981–1991	Maryland	Democratic	1948–present
