= Samuel Dennis =

Samuel Dennis may refer to:

- Samuel Dennis (Australian politician) (1870–1945), member of the Australian Parliament
- Samuel Dennis (academic), English academic administrator at the University of Oxford
- Samuel K. Dennis (died 1892), American politician from Maryland
- Samuel K. Dennis Jr. (1874–1953), his son, American politician, judge and lawyer from Maryland
