= Samuel K. Dennis Jr. =

American politician and judge (1874–1953)

Member of the Maryland House of Delegates
- In office 1904–1906

Personal details
- Born: Samuel King Dennis Jr. September 28, 1874 Beverly, Pocomoke City, Maryland, U.S.
- Died: January 11, 1953 (aged 78) Roland Park, Baltimore, Maryland, U.S.
- Resting place: Druid Ridge Cemetery; Pikesville, Maryland, U.S.
- Party: Democratic
- Spouse: Helen Gordon Moore (m. 1911)
- Parent: Samuel K. Dennis (father)
- Relatives: Henry Page (uncle); George R. Dennis (half-uncle); James U. Dennis (half-uncle)
- Education: University of Maryland School of Law; Loyola College (D.Litt.)
- Occupation: Politician; judge; lawyer

Samuel King Dennis Jr. (September 28, 1874 – January 11, 1953) was an American politician, judge and lawyer from Maryland. He served as a member of the Maryland House of Delegates, representing Worcester County, from 1904 to 1906.

== Early life and education ==
Samuel King Dennis Jr. was born on September 28, 1874, at Beverly in Pocomoke City, Maryland, to Sally Handy (née Crisfield) and Samuel K. Dennis. His uncle was Henry Page and his half-uncles were George R. Dennis and James U. Dennis. He attended local public schools and Blairstown Academy in Blairstown, New Jersey. Dennis was admitted to Princeton University, but did not attend due to his father's illness. He returned to the family farm and he later studied stenography. He graduated from the University of Maryland School of Law in 1903. He was admitted to the bar on June 30, 1904, and started practicing law in Baltimore. Later in life, Dennis received a Doctor of Letters degree from Loyola College.

== Career ==
Dennis served as private secretary to congressman John Walter Smith from 1900 to 1904. He would remain friends with Smith until Smith's death in 1925. He was elected as a Democrat to the Maryland House of Delegates, representing Worcester County, in 1904.

Dennis practiced law in partnership with his cousin John Upshur Dennis. In 1915, he was appointed by President Woodrow Wilson as U.S. Attorney for Maryland. He served from 1915 to 1920. He was appointed chief judge of the Supreme Bench of Baltimore City in August 1928 by Governor Albert Ritchie, succeeding James P. Gorter. He retired from the bench on September 28, 1944, after reaching the mandatory retirement age of 70 and returned to private practice.

Dennis was secretary of the Maryland commission to the Louisiana Purchase Exposition in 1904 and secretary of the Baltimore Jubilee Commission in 1905. He helped found the Maryland Tuberculosis Sanitarium in Sabillasville, Maryland. He served as secretary, treasurer and president of the organization for 23 years. Dennis served as president of the Maryland State Bar Association from 1933 to 1934. He served as the chairman of the American Red Cross, Baltimore chapter, from 1942 to 1945. He also served as vice president of the Maryland Historical Society and director of the Fidelity Trust Company, Eutaw Savings Bank and Fidelity and Deposit Company. He was a Presbyterian and served as trustee of the First Presbyterian Church of Baltimore.

== Personal life ==
Dennis married Helen Gordon Moore in 1911. They had no children. His friends would call him Sam Dennis.

Dennis died of a heart attack on January 11, 1953, at his home at 100-B Ridgewood Road in Roland Park, Baltimore. He was buried at Druid Ridge Cemetery.
