= Judge Dennis =

Judge Dennis may refer to:

- James L. Dennis (born 1936), judge of the United States Court of Appeals for the Fifth Circuit
- Samuel K. Dennis Jr. (1874–1953), judge of the Supreme Bench of Baltimore City, Maryland

== See also ==
- Justice Dennis (disambiguation)
