= Samuel K. Dennis =

American politician (died 1892)

Member of the Maryland Senate
- In office 1888–1890
- Preceded by: John W. Henry
- Succeeded by: John Walter Smith

Member of the Maryland House of Delegates
- In office 1878–1880
- In office 1870–1872

Personal details
- Born: Samuel King Dennis
- Died: May 12, 1892 (aged 52) Beverly, Pocomoke City, Maryland, U.S.
- Party: Democratic
- Spouse: Sally Handry Crisfield
- Children: Samuel K. Dennis Jr.
- Relatives: George R. Dennis (half-brother); James U. Dennis (half-brother)

Samuel King Dennis (died May 12, 1892) was an American politician from Maryland. He served as a member of the Maryland House of Delegates, representing Worcester County, from 1870 to 1872 and 1878 to 1880. He served as a member of the Maryland Senate from 1888 to 1890.

== Early life ==
Samuel King Dennis was born to John Upshur Dennis. His half-brothers, George R. Dennis and James U. Dennis both served in the Maryland Senate and Maryland House of Delegates. His sister married Congressman Henry Page.

== Career ==
Dennis was a Democrat. He served as a member of the Maryland House of Delegates, representing Worcester County, for two terms, from 1870 to 1872 and 1878 to 1880. Dennis served as a member of the Maryland Senate, representing Worcester County, from 1888 to 1890.

== Personal life ==
Dennis married Sally Handy Crisfield, daughter of John W. Crisfield. His son, Samuel K. Dennis Jr., was a lawyer and served in the Maryland House of Delegates.

Dennis was an active member of the Presbyterian church. He died on May 12, 1892, at the age of 52, at his home at Beverly in Pocomoke City, Maryland.
