= John Dennis (1771–1806) =

American politician

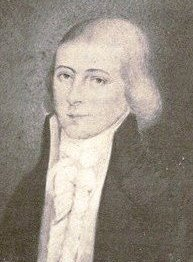

Member of the U.S. House of Representatives from Maryland's 8th district
- In office March 4, 1797 – March 3, 1805
- Preceded by: William Vans Murray
- Succeeded by: Charles Goldsborough

Personal details
- Born: December 17, 1771 Pocomoke City, Province of Maryland, British America
- Died: August 17, 1806 (aged 34) Philadelphia, Pennsylvania, United States
- Resting place: Christ Church Burial Ground, Philadelphia, Pennsylvania
- Party: Federalist
- Children: John Dennis (1807–1859)
- Relatives: Littleton Purnell Dennis (nephew)
- Education: Yale College
- Occupation: Lawyer, politician

John Dennis (December 17, 1771 – August 17, 1806) was a Representative from Maryland.

Dennis was born at his family home, Beverly, in Pocomoke City in the Province of Maryland, on December 17, 1771. He completed preparatory studies at Washington Academy, attended Yale College; studied law; was admitted to the bar in 1793 and commenced practice in Somerset County, Maryland. He later served two terms in the Maryland House of Delegates, before being elected as a Federalist to the United States House of Representatives, where he served from March 4, 1797 to March 3, 1805. During that time, Dennis was one of the House managers appointed in 1798 to conduct the impeachment proceedings against Senator William Blount of Tennessee.

He was the father of John Dennis (1807–1859) and uncle of Littleton Purnell Dennis.

Dennis died in Philadelphia, Pennsylvania, where he was interred in Christ Church Burial Ground.

U.S. House of Representatives
Preceded by William V. Murray	Member of the U.S. House of Representatives from Maryland's 8th congressional district March 4, 1797 – March 3, 1805	Succeeded by Charles Goldsborough
