= Littleton Purnell Dennis =

American politician

Member of the U.S. House of Representatives from Maryland's 1st district
- In office March 3, 1833 – April 14, 1834
- Preceded by: Daniel Jenifer
- Succeeded by: John Nevett Steele

Member of the Maryland Senate
- In office 1827–1833

Member of the Maryland House of Delegates
- In office 1819–1821
- In office 1815–1816

Personal details
- Born: July 21, 1786 July 21, 1786 – April 14, 1834 "Beverly" in Pocomoke City, Worcester County, Maryland
- Died: April 14, 1834 (aged 47) Washington, D.C.
- Resting place: Congressional Cemetery, Washington, D.C.
- Party: Anti-Jacksonian; Whig (after 1833)
- Parents: Henry Dennis (father); Anne Purnell (mother)
- Relatives: John Dennis (uncle); John Dennis (cousin); Littleton Dennis Jr. (cousin)
- Education: Yale College
- Occupation: Lawyer, politician

Littleton Purnell Dennis (July 21, 1786 – April 14, 1834) was an American politician who served in the United States House of Representatives, Maryland House of Delegates, Maryland State Senate, and in the Maryland Executive Council.

== Early life, education, and career ==
Dennis was born July 21, 1786, at "Beverly" in Pocomoke City, Worcester County, Maryland, the son of Henry Dennis and Anne Dennis (née Purnell). Dennis was tutored at home. He thereafter attended Washington Academy of Somerset County, Maryland, and graduated from Yale College in 1803. He studied law, was admitted to the bar, and commenced practice. Dennis was a nephew of John Dennis (1771–1806) and cousin of Littleton Dennis Jr. and John Dennis (1807–1859).

== Political career ==
In 1810; 1815 and 1816; and again from 1819 to 1821, Dennis served as a member of the Maryland House of Delegates. He was a member of the executive council of Maryland in 1829. From 1827 until resigning in 1833, he served in the Maryland Senate. Dennis was elected as an Anti-Jacksonian to the United States House of Representatives in 1832 and served from March 4, 1833, until his death in office in 1834. Dennis affiliated himself with the newly-founded Whig Party.

Dennis was a presidential elector in 1812, 1824, and 1828.

== Personal life and death ==
Dennis never was married and had no children. He died April 14, 1834, while in Washington, D.C. and was interred in the Congressional Cemetery there.

== See also ==
- List of members of the United States Congress who died in office (1790–1899)

U.S. House of Representatives
| Preceded by Daniel Jenifer | Member of the U.S. House of Representatives from Maryland's 1st congressional district March 4, 1833 – April 14, 1834 | Succeeded by John Nevett Steele |
