= James U. Dennis =

American politician and lawyer (1823–1900)

James Upshur Dennis

Member of the Maryland Senate
- In office 1876–1880

Member of the Maryland House of Delegates
- In office 1860–1861
- In office 1840

Personal details
- Born: September 11, 1823 Worcester County, Maryland, U.S.
- Died: June 22, 1900 (aged 76) Princess Anne, Maryland, U.S.
- Resting place: St. Andrew's Cemetery; Princess Anne, Maryland, U.S.
- Spouses: Cecilia B. Hooe (m. 1846; died 1861) Mary Wilson Teackle (m. 1863)
- Children: 4
- Relatives: George R. Dennis (brother); Samuel K. Dennis (half-brother)
- Education: Princeton University
- Occupation: Politician; lawyer

James Upshur Dennis (September 11, 1823 – June 22, 1900) was an American politician and lawyer. He served as a member of the Maryland House of Delegates and Maryland Senate.

== Early life ==
James Upshur Dennis was born on September 11, 1823, at Beverly on the Pocomoke River in Worcester County, Maryland to Maria (née Robertson) and John Upshur Dennis. He graduated from Princeton University in 1842. Dennis studied law with William W. Handy of Princess Anne and was admitted to the bar in 1845.

== Career ==
Dennis was elected to the Maryland House of Delegates, representing Worcester County in 1840. Dennis moved to Princess Anne in 1850. He was elected as state's attorney for Somerset County in 1855, serving for four years. In 1859, he was elected again to the House of Delegates, representing Somerset County from 1860 to 1861. He was elected to the Maryland Constitutional Conventions of 1851 and 1864. In 1876, Dennis was elected to the Maryland Senate, representing Somerset County from 1876 to 1880.

In 1868, Dennis created a law practice with Robert Franklin Brattan. He remained in that partnership until 1894.

== Personal life ==
Dennis married Cecilia B. Hooe of Alexandria, Virginia in 1846. They had three daughters: Mrs. Robert F. Brattan, Mrs. Rufus W. Dashiell and Maria R. His wife died in 1861. Dennis married Mary Wilson Teackle of Baltimore in 1863. They had one son, James Teackle. His brother was U.S. Senator George R. Dennis. His half-brother was Samuel K. Dennis.

Dennis died at his home in Princess Anne on June 22, 1900, following a fall the week prior. He was buried at St. Andrew's Cemetery in St. Andrew's Episcopal Church in Princess Anne.
