= Justice Dennis =

Justice Dennis may refer to:

- James L. Dennis (born 1936), associate justice of the Louisiana Supreme Court
- Littleton Dennis Jr. (1765–1833), associate justice of the Maryland Court of Appeals

== See also ==
- Judge Dennis (disambiguation)
