= Pocomoke City Historic District =

Historic district in Maryland, United States

- U.S. National Register of Historic Places
- U.S. Historic district
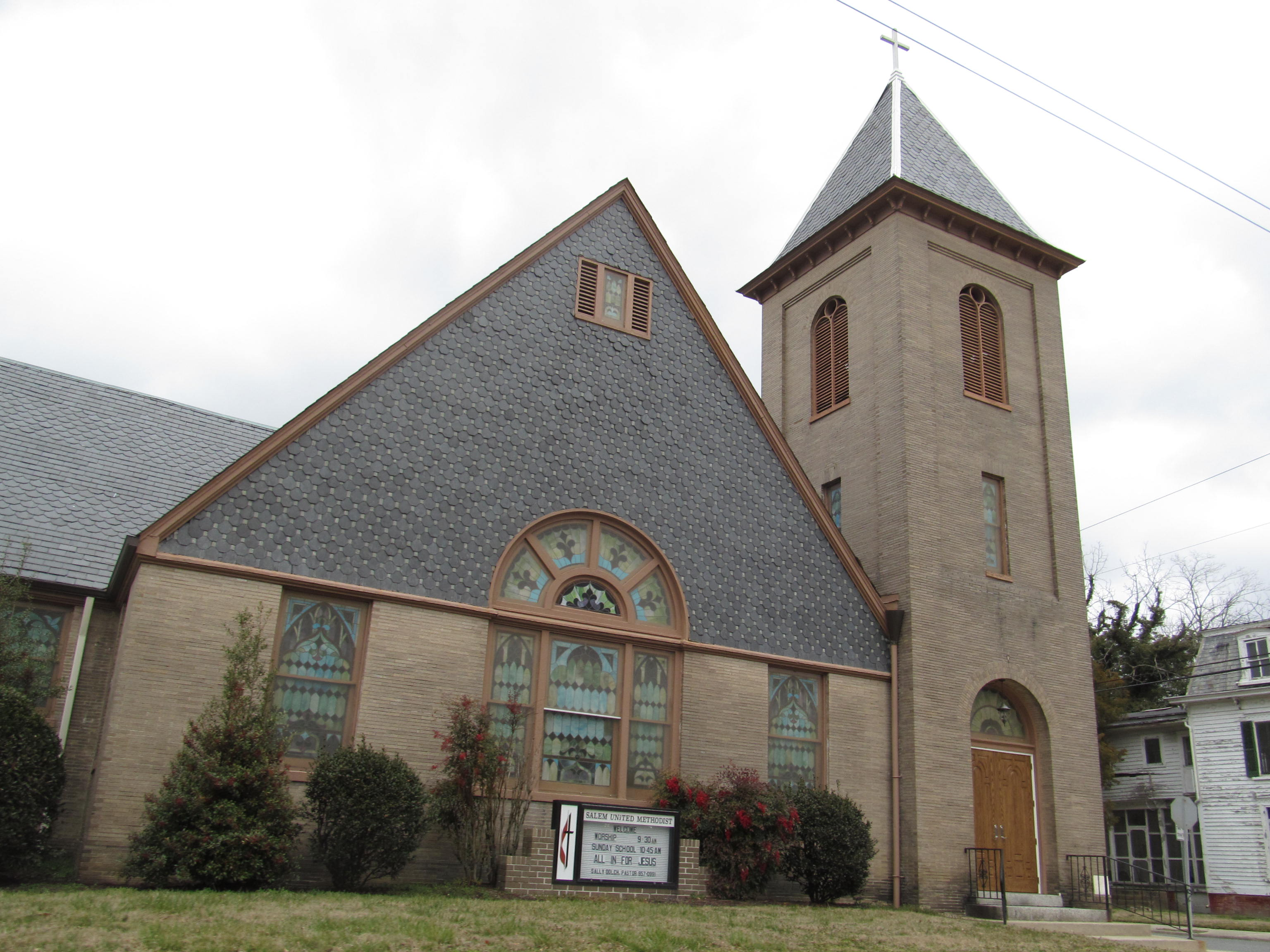
- Salem Methodist Church, seen in 2013

- Location within Maryland Location within the United States
- Location: Market, Cedar, 2nd, Clarke, Bridge Sts., Linden Ave., Pocomoke City, Maryland
- Coordinates: 38°4′24″N 75°33′57″W
- Area: 220 acres (89 ha)
- Built: 1868
- Architectural style: Federal, Late Victorian
- NRHP reference No.: 04001383
- Added to NRHP: December 23, 2004

The Pocomoke City Historic District is a national historic district in Pocomoke City, Worcester County, Maryland. The historic district includes the central business district (CBD) and surrounding residential area of Pocomoke City. The CBD is defined by an important collection of late-19th-century and early-20th-century commercial and public architecture. It includes a significant array of Victorian, Colonial Revival, and Beaux-Arts influenced structures. The majority of the housing dates from 1870 to 1940. It is an example of a type of prosperous river town that characterized the region during the period, which retains an exceptional collection of 19th and 20th century building forms.

It was added to the National Register of Historic Places in 2004.
