= Costen House =

Historic house in Maryland, United States

- U.S. National Register of Historic Places
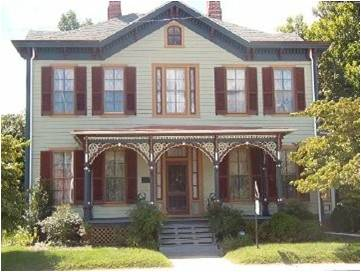
- The Isaac Costen House

- Location within Maryland Location within the United States
- Location: 206 Market St., Pocomoke City, Maryland
- Coordinates: 38°4′29″N 75°34′4″W
- Area: less than one acre
- Built: c. 1870
- Architectural style: Italianate
- NRHP reference No.: 75000934
- Added to NRHP: December 6, 1975

The Costen House is a historic U.S. home located at 206 Market Street, Pocomoke City, Maryland, United States. Dr. Isaac Thomas Costen built the house c. 1870s and members of his family lived there for over a century. Dr. Costen became the first Mayor of Pocomoke City. The house currently serves as The Isaac Costen House Museum.

The Costen House was listed on the National Register of Historic Places in 1975.

== The Isaac Costen House Museum ==
The Isaac Costen House Museum provides information on the Costen family and how people in the area lived during 1870–1920. The grounds of the museum also includes The Hall-Walton Memorial Garden.
