= George Vickers =

American politician

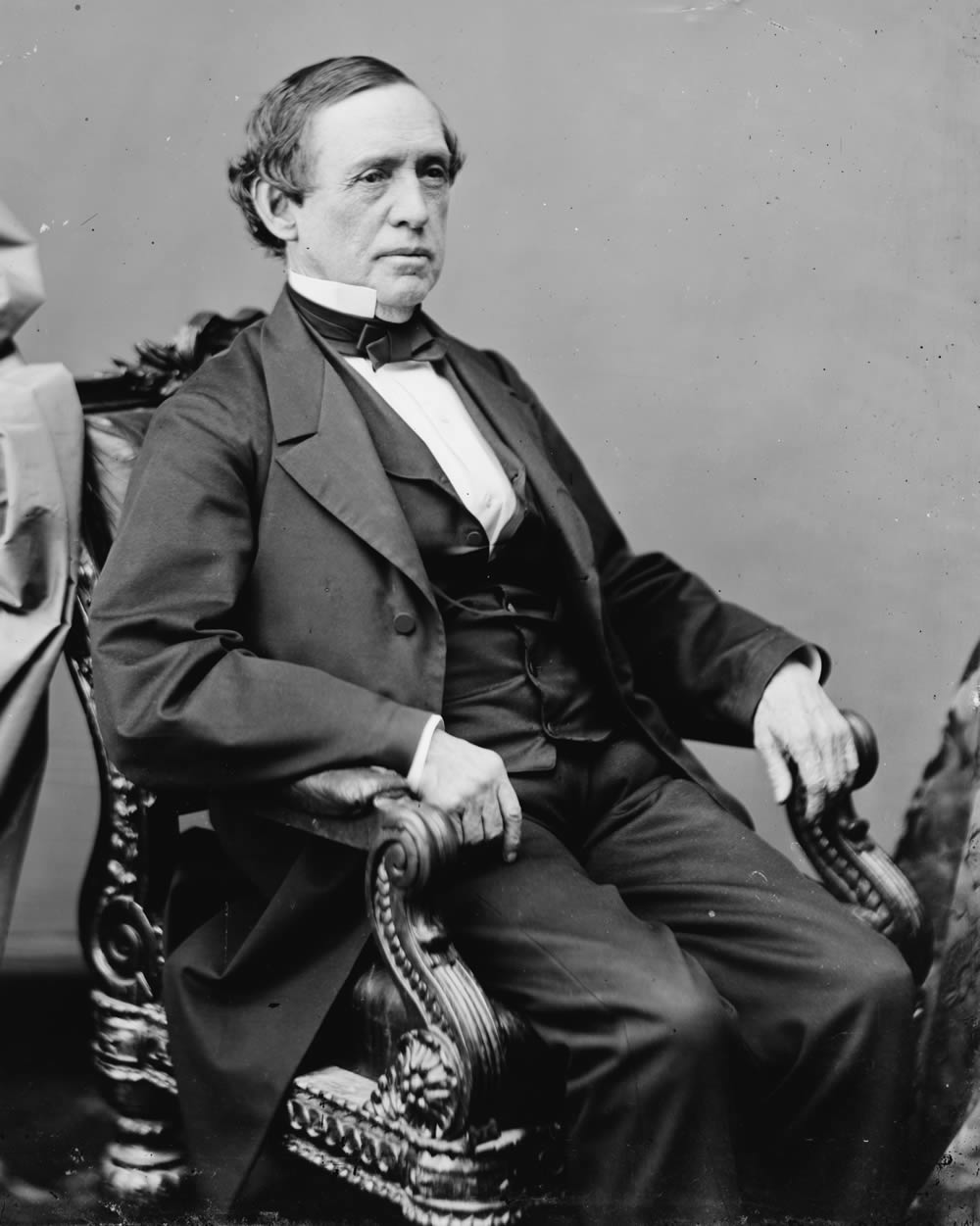

United States Senator from Maryland
- In office March 7, 1868 – March 3, 1873
- Preceded by: John A. J. Creswell
- Succeeded by: George R. Dennis

Member of the Maryland Senate
- In office 1866–67

Personal details
- Born: November 19, 1801 Chestertown, Maryland, US
- Died: October 8, 1879 (aged 77) Chestertown, Maryland, US
- Party: Democratic
- Profession: Politician, Lawyer

Military service
- Branch/service: Maryland Militia
- Rank: Major General

George Vickers (November 19, 1801 – October 8, 1879), a Democrat, was a United States Senator from Maryland, serving from 1868 to 1873. He cast the deciding vote in the Senate that saved U.S. President Andrew Johnson from impeachment. Vickers also served in the Maryland State Senate.

Vickers was born in Chestertown, Maryland, and was employed in the Kent County, Maryland clerk's office for several years. He studied law, and was admitted to the bar in 1832, commencing practice in Chestertown.

He also served as a major general of the Maryland State Militia during the Civil War. Of his four sons, one fought for the North while a second son, Benjamin Vickers, fought in the Confederate 2nd Tennessee Regiment and was killed at the Battle of Shiloh.

In 1864, Vickers served as presidential elector on the Democratic ticket, and was vice president of the National Union Convention of Conservatives in Philadelphia in 1866. He served as a member of the Maryland State Senate from 1866 to 1867, and was elected as a Democrat to the United States Senate to fill the vacancy caused by the action of the Senate in declining to permit Philip F. Thomas to qualify.

Just as Vickers was named to the Senate, the impeachment of U.S. President Andrew Johnson had begun. Radical Republicans were trying to remove Johnson because of his moderate views on Reconstruction. Supporters of the President crossed the Chesapeake Bay in an iceboat, woke Vickers in the middle of the night, and notified him that the Republican effort to block his election to the Senate had failed. Vickers rushed to Washington, was sworn in on March 7, 1868, and shortly after cast the deciding vote against the impeachment of President Johnson.

In 1870, Vickers led southern Democrats in an effort to block the swearing-in of newly elected Senator Hiram Rhodes Revels of Mississippi, the first Black member of the Senate. Vickers argued that the decision in Dred Scott v. Sandford meant that Revels had only been a citizen for the two years since the Fourteenth Amendment had been ratified, and not the required nine. The Senate voted down the objection and Revels was sworn in.

After his term in the Senate, which lasted until March 3, 1873, Vickers resumed the practice of law in Chestertown, and died there in 1879. He is interred in Chester Cemetery.

U.S. Senate
Preceded by John A. J. Creswell	U.S. senator (Class 3) from Maryland; March 7, 1868 – March 3, 1873; Served alongside: Reverdy Johnson, William P. Whyte and William T. Hamilton	Succeeded by George R. Dennis
