= Flag Salute =

1934 poem by Esther Popel

"Flag Salute" is a poem written by Esther Popel about the lynching of George Armwood on October 18, 1933, in Princess Anne, Maryland. It was first published in August 1934 in The Crisis and later republished in its entirety on the cover of The Crisis in 1940.

It juxtaposes the murder of Armwood with quotations from the Pledge of Allegiance. The poem reflects that lynching in the United States had become a "ritual of interracial social control."
