= Esther Popel =

American poet (1896–1958)

Esther B. Popel
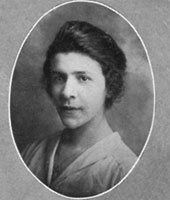
- Esther Popel, 1920
- Born: July 16, 1896; Harrisburg, Pennsylvania
- Died: January 28, 1958 (aged 61)
- Spouse: William Andrew Shaw (m.1925)
- Writing career
- Movement: Harlem Renaissance

Esther B. Popel (July 16, 1896 – January 28, 1958; also known as Esther Popel Shaw) was an African-American poet of the Harlem Renaissance, an activist, and an educator. She wrote and edited for magazines such as The Crisis, the Journal of Negro Education, and Opportunity.

== Early life and education ==
Esther Popel was born on July 16, 1896, to Joseph Gibbs (a mailman) and Helen King Anderson Popel in Harrisburg, Pennsylvania. She had an elder sister, Helen, and a younger brother, Samuel. Shaw graduated from Central High School in Harrisburg in 1915 and went on to Dickinson College in the fall. She was the first African-American woman to enroll at the college and also the first to graduate. Popel chose to pursue the Latin Scientific curriculum, which emphasized Latin and modern languages such as French, German, and Spanish. Upon graduating, Popel received Dickinson's top academic prize, the John Patton Memorial Prize for Excellent Scholarship, and she was inaugurated as a member of Phi Beta Kappa.

On April 11, 1925, Popel married chemist William Andrew Shaw; their daughter, Esther Patricia, was born on June 1, 1926. While most of her poetry was published under her maiden name, she later wrote reviews and other articles under her married name of Esther Popel Shaw.

== Career as poet and writer ==
Historians recognize Popel as an activist and a poet of the Harlem Renaissance. In 1915, while a senior in high school, she self-published her first book of poetry, Thoughtless Thinks by a Thinkless Thaughter. Nineteen years later, she privately published an anthology of lyrical and political poems entitled A Forest Pool and dedicated it to the memory of her mother, who had recently died. Although these were her only two books, she also published poems in a number of magazines of the era and numbered among her friends and admirers such poets as Langston Hughes, Marita Bonner, and Georgia Douglas Johnson; Popel was a member of the latter's Saturday Nighters literary salon in Washington.

Popel published poems in The Crisis, which was the official publication of the National Association for the Advancement of Colored People (NAACP), and in Opportunity: A Journal of Negro Life, published by the National Urban League. She is listed among the prize-winning authors of the latter publication. She wrote one of her most recognized poems, "Flag Salute," in response to the highly publicized October 18, 1933 lynching of an African-American man named George Armwood on Maryland's Eastern Shore. Her poem juxtaposes this historical event with quotations from the Pledge of Allegiance. In 1934, The Crisis published Popel's poem and featured it again on the cover of the November 1940 issue. A committee reporting the Board of Education in Washington found the poem "objectionable" and it was used to recommend that the District of Columbia schools disallow The Crisis. Other of her most recognizable poems include "Blasphemy-American Style," "October Prayer," "Night Comes Walking," and "Little Gray Leaves." Five of her poems were republished in the Beltway Poetry Quarterly in 2013.

Popel Shaw served on the editorial board for the Negro History Bulletin, which was a publication of the Association for the Study of African American Life and History established by the historian Carter G. Woodson. When Woodson died in 1950, Popel Shaw was named among the individuals who would carry on his legacy. In addition to her contribution to the Bulletin, Popel Shaw regularly published book reviews in the Journal of Negro History and the Journal of Negro Education. In her writings in these publications she voiced her opinions about race relations in the United States. She also wrote a half dozen plays for high school students.

== Teaching career and activism ==
In order to support herself, Popel Shaw taught junior high school classes in French, English, algebra, and penmanship. Her teaching career spanned four decades beginning with brief early positions at Douglass Junior High School in Baltimore and Shaw Junior High School in Washington, DC. Her longest-running job was at Francis Junior High in Washington, DC, where she taught from the late 1920s until her retirement in 1952.

Popel Shaw was active throughout her life in African-American and women's rights organizations. In the early 1920s she was a member of the College Alumnae Club, an organization of college-educated African-American women activists who supported education, especially for African-American girls. She served as vice-president and president during her involvement with the club. In 1923, the club became the National Association of College Women (NACW), and as a charter member Popel Shaw was appointed chair of the committee on the constitution. She went on to serve as secretary of the NACW's executive board for 19 years, during which period she also functioned as the organization's chief spokeswoman. In 1933, Popel Shaw represented NACW when the Women's International League of Peace and Freedom presented disarmament petitions to President Roosevelt in the White House. In 1942 she became the NACW's wartime liaison to the Washington Department of the Office of Price Administration.

Other positions that Popel Shaw held included serving on Delta Sigma Theta vigilance committee. Delta was an organization that Popel had been extremely active with; dating back to 1922 when she and four other women chartered the Epsilon Sigma chapter, now known as Baltimore Alumnae chapter. Her only daughter Patricia was also involved with the sorority, joining Delta while enrolled at Howard University.

Popel served as a consultant to the Educational Policies Commission and a board member of the Southeast Settlement House for African-Americans. As part of her work with the commission, she was appointed by the National Education Association and the Department of Superintendence to develop long-range plans to improve education in the United States.

In 1952, a heart condition forced Popel Shaw to retire from teaching. In her retirement she took up painting as a hobby. On January 28, 1958, she died of a stroke and was buried in the Lincoln Memorial Cemetery in Washington, DC.

== Selected works ==
- "Credo" (Opportunity, January 1925)
- "Kinship" (Opportunity, January 1925)
- "Theft" (Opportunity, April 1925)
- "Little Grey Leaves" (Opportunity, September 1925)
- "Night Comes Walking" (Journal of Negro Life, August 1929)
- "Bagatelle" (Opportunity, November 1931)
- "October Prayer" (Opportunity, October 1933)
- "Reach Down, Sweet Grass" (Opportunity, April 1934)
- "Flag Salute" (The Crisis, August 1934)
- "Blasphemy American Style" (Opportunity, December 1934)
- A Forest Pool (Modernistic Press, 1934)
- "The Fort Pillow Massacre" (Negro History Bulletin, 1944)
