= Puncheon Mill House =

Historic house in Maryland, United States

- U.S. National Register of Historic Places
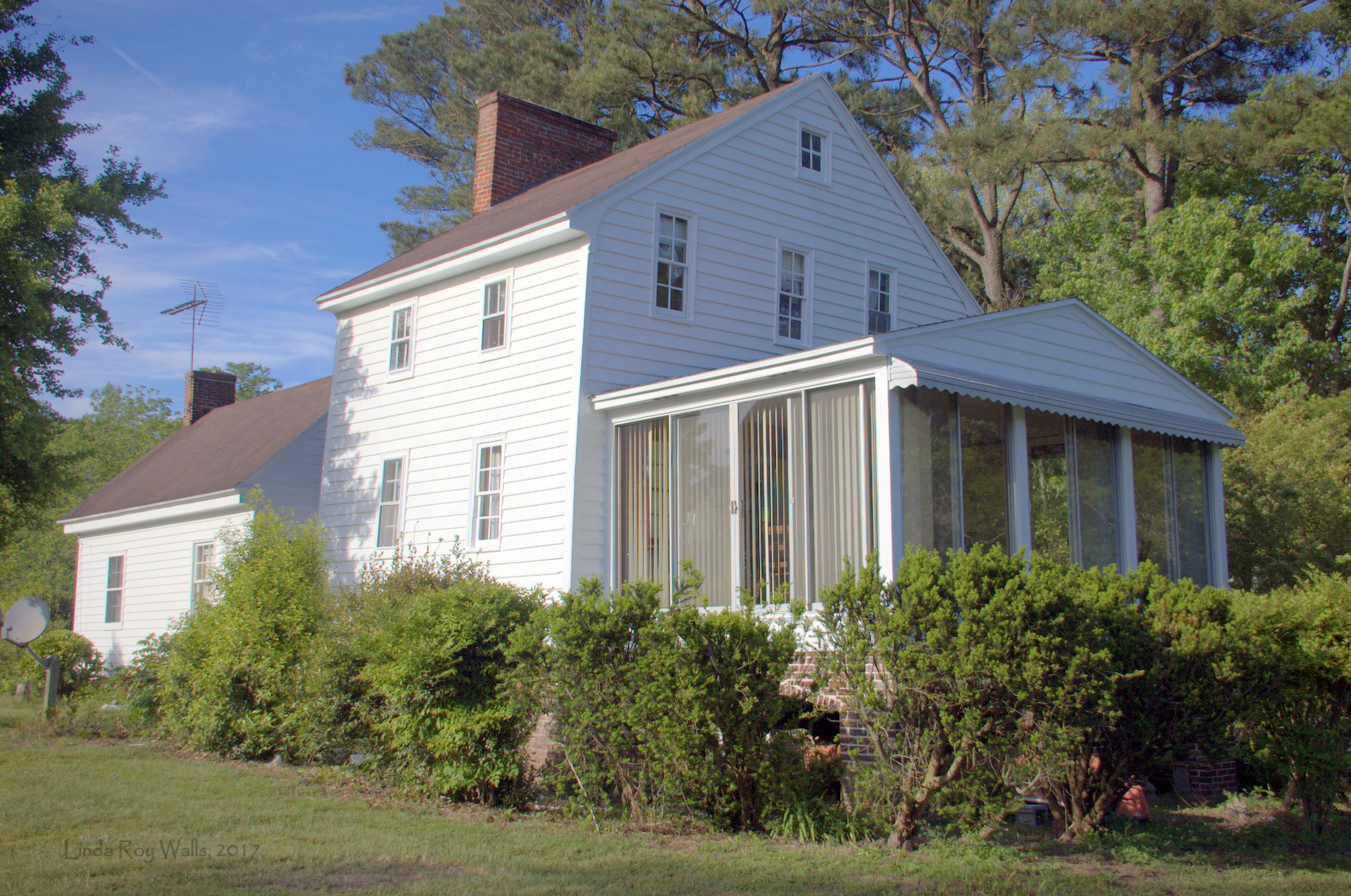

- Location within Maryland Location within the United States
- Location: Puncheon Landing Road; Pocomoke City, Maryland
- Coordinates: 38°4′35″N 75°36′26″W
- Area: less than one acre
- Built: 1810
- Architectural style: Federal
- NRHP reference No.: 94000763
- Added to NRHP: July 27, 1994

Puncheon Mill House, also known as Puncheon's Landing, is a historic home located at Pocomoke City, Somerset County, Maryland. It is a two-story, three-by-two-bay gable-front frame dwelling supported on a raised common bond brick foundation. It was built between 1810 and 1820, and is sheathed with beaded cypress weatherboards and covered with a medium-pitched wood shingle roof. The house was restored and expanded in the 1960s with the addition of a kitchen wing.

It was listed on the National Register of Historic Places in 1994.
