= Hayward's Lott =

Historic house in Maryland, United States

- U.S. National Register of Historic Places
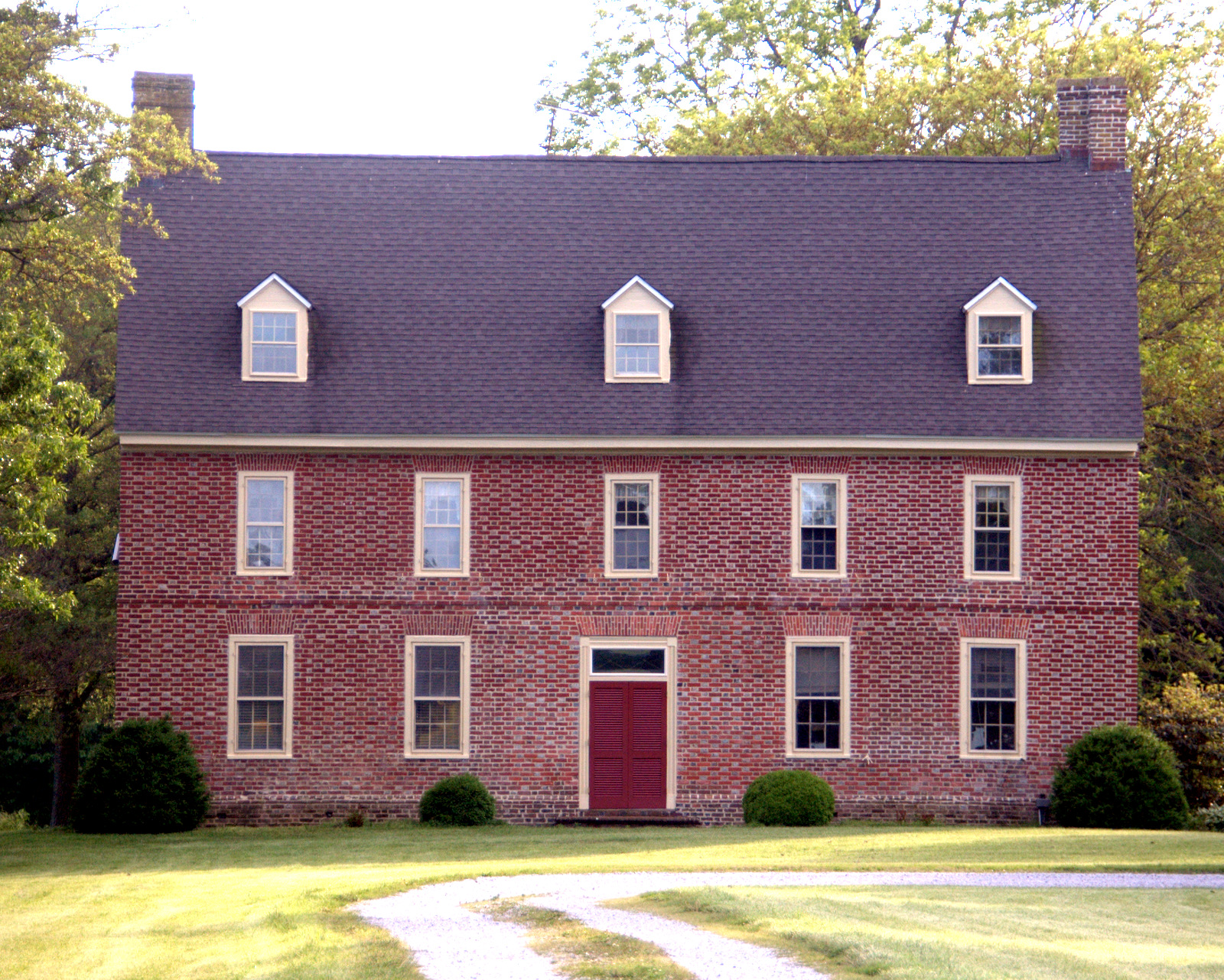

- Location within Maryland Location within the United States
- Location: Hayward Road; Pocomoke City, Maryland
- Coordinates: 38°5′35″N 75°35′21″W
- Area: 20 acres (8.1 ha)
- Built: 1727
- NRHP reference No.: 76001009
- Added to NRHP: May 13, 1976

Hayward's Lott, also known as Ivy Hall, is a historic home located at Pocomoke City, Somerset County, Maryland, United States. It is a 2 1/2-story farmhouse built about 1730 of Flemish bond brickwork with glazed headers. The house features small windows in the principal elevations, a steeply pitched roof, and two interior T-shaped chimneys.

Hayward's Lott was listed on the National Register of Historic Places in 1976.
