= Littleton T. Clarke House =

Historic house in Maryland, United States

- U.S. National Register of Historic Places
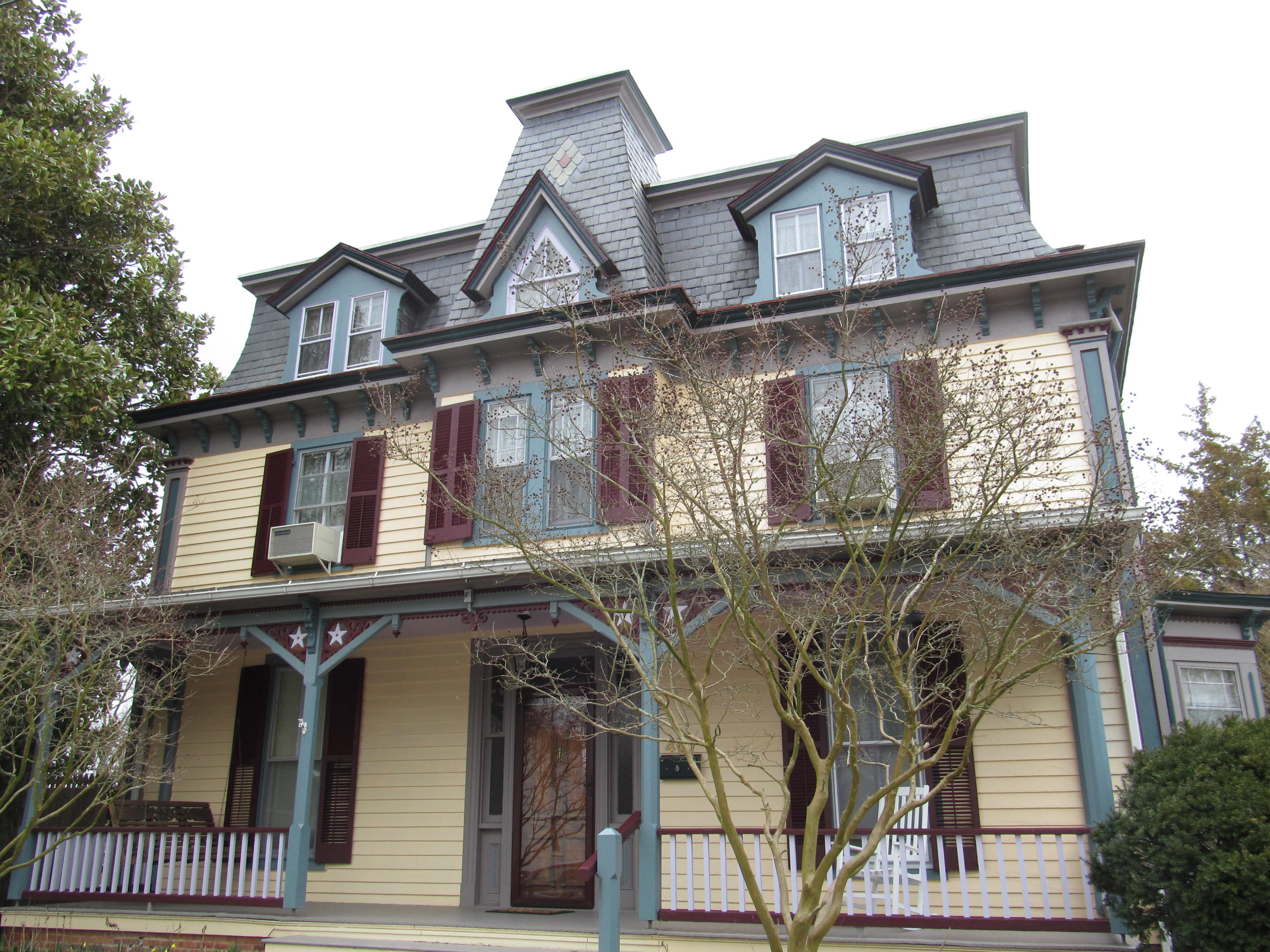
- The Littleton T. Clarke House in 2013

- Location within Maryland Location within the United States
- Location: 407 2nd St., Pocomoke City, Maryland
- Coordinates: 38°4′16″N 75°34′10″W
- Area: 0.3 acres (0.12 ha)
- Built: 1860
- Architectural style: Second Empire
- NRHP reference No.: 96000519
- Added to NRHP: May 2, 1996

The Littleton T. Clarke House is a historic home located at Pocomoke City, Worcester County, Maryland, United States. It is a 2 1/2-story Second Empire–style frame house with a concave curved mansard roof constructed about 1860.

The Littleton T. Clarke House was listed on the National Register of Historic Places in 1996.
