= Crockett House (Pocomoke City, Maryland) =

Historic house in Maryland, United States

- U.S. National Register of Historic Places
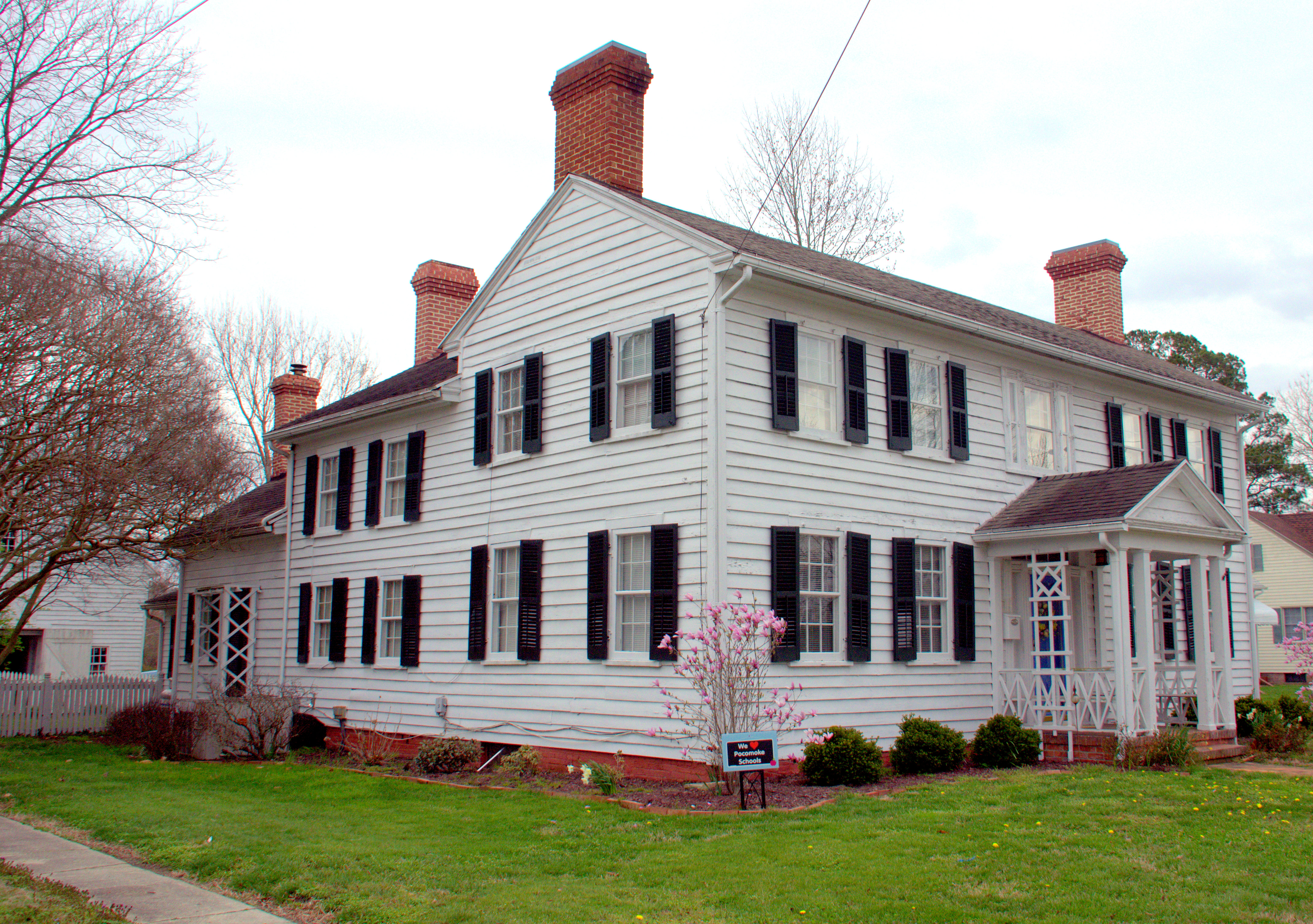

- Location within Maryland Location within the United States
- Location: 900 Market St. Pocomoke City, Maryland
- Coordinates: 38°4′9″N 75°33′34″W
- Area: 0.3 acres (0.12 ha)
- Built: 1850
- Architectural style: Greek Revival
- NRHP reference No.: 96000299
- Added to NRHP: March 21, 1996

Crockett House is a historic home located at Pocomoke City, Worcester County, Maryland, United States. The house is a two-story center passage plan frame dwelling, constructed about 1850, that reflects the influence of the Greek Revival style. Attached is a stepped "telescope" service wing.

Crockett House was listed on the National Register of Historic Places in 1996.
