= Young-Sartorius House =

Historic house in Maryland, United States

- Young--Sartorius House
- U.S. National Register of Historic Places
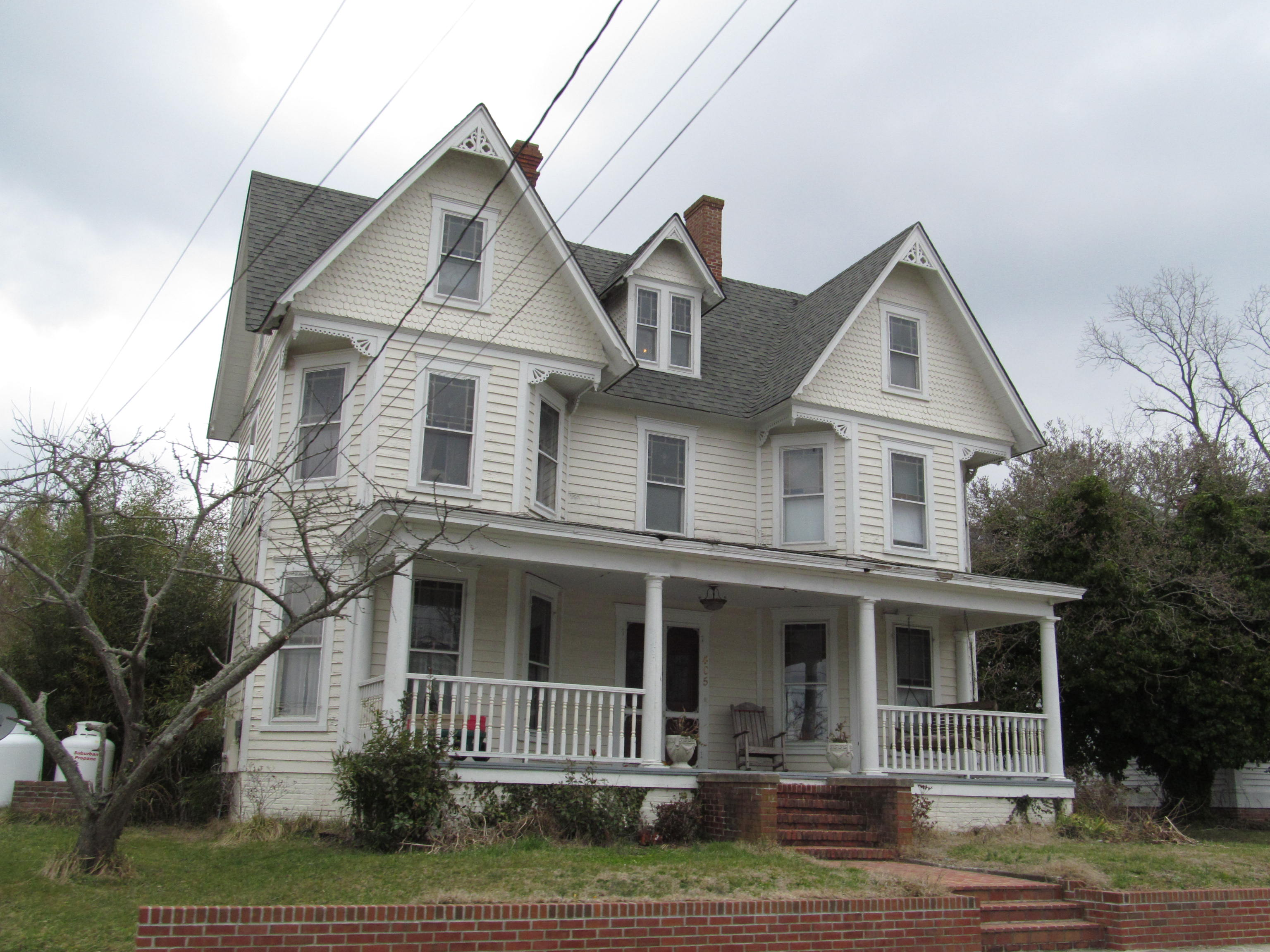
- The Young-Sartorius House in 2013

- Location within Maryland Location within the United States
- Location: 405 Market St., Pocomoke City, Maryland
- Coordinates: 38°4′25″N 75°33′57″W
- Area: 0.3 acres (0.12 ha)
- Built: c. 1860
- Architectural style: Queen Anne
- NRHP reference No.: 96000948
- Added to NRHP: August 30, 1996

The Young-Sartorius House is a historic home located at Pocomoke City, Worcester County, Maryland. It is a 2 1/2-story, center-passage / single-pile frame dwelling built in two stages between about 1860 and about 1900.

It was listed on the National Register of Historic Places in 1996.
