= Lynching of George Armwood =

African American who was lynched in the U.S.

George Armwood was an African American who was lynched in Princess Anne, Maryland, on October 18, 1933. His murder was the last recorded lynching in Maryland.

== Details of the crime ==
On October 16, 1933, a 71-year-old woman named Mary Denston was assaulted while walking home from the post office in Princess Anne by a young black man. Denston identified her assailant as 23-year-old George Armwood, a laborer who lived near Pocomoke City, in the southern portion of Worcester County. Police found Armwood at the home of his employer, John Richardson. Armwood's mother who lived nearby was quoted as stating that the police beat her son in a field across from her home so profusely, that she felt he might be dead already from the beating. Expecting additional violence against Armwood, this time by angry white residents, the police took Armwood to the jail in Salisbury. After an angry crowd gathered at the Salisbury jail, Armwood was relocated to the jail in Cecil County and then again to Baltimore County. Judge Robert F. Duer and State's Attorney John Robins assured Governor Albert Ritchie that if George Armwood were to return to the Eastern Shore of Maryland, his safety would be guaranteed. In the early morning of October 17, Armwood was returned to Princess Anne.

Maryland State Police Captain Edward McKim Johnson was fearful that mob violence would erupt and requested that Armwood be again removed from Princess Anne. Robins declined that request. Governor Ritchie consulted with Maryland Attorney General William Preston Lane, Jr. to determine if the state could overrule Robins and remove Armwood. Lane determined that for Ritchie to do so would require the declaration of martial law.

Sheriff's Deputy Norman Dryden was concerned about the potential for violence on the afternoon of October 17, and he approached Edward Young, commander of the Princess Anne chapter of the American Legion, asking that legionnaires be made available to help preserve order.

Later that day, an angry crowd of 1000 gathered outside the jail on Williams Street. Judge Duer spoke to the crowd and asked them not to harm Armwood, saying he held the members of the crowd "to their honor." Dryden, Johnson, and 23 other officers were watching the jailhouse that evening. The police fired tear gas in an attempt to disperse the crowd. When the police ran out of tear gas, the crowd broke open the jailhouse doors, using two fifteen-foot timbers as battering rams. The crowd knocked Capt. Johnson, unconscious, took the keys to the cells from Deputy Dryden and headed to the second-floor cells where George Armwood and other black prisoners were held.

The mob found Armwood hiding under his mattress and tied a noose around his neck. Armwood was dragged down the steps out of the jail, beaten, stabbed, and kicked as the crowd tied him to the back of a truck and took him to a nearby property where he was hanged. After Armwood was dead, the mob dragged the body back to the courthouse on the corner of Prince and Williams Street, where the body was hanged from a telephone pole and burned. After the body was extinguished, it was moved and left in Hayman's Lumber yard until authorities gathered it the following morning.

== Aftermath ==
Two years later, a grand jury heard testimony from 42 witnesses to the lynching, including twelve black men who were held in jail. Although state police officers personally identified nine men as acting leaders of the mob, a local grand jury declined to indict anyone for Armwood's murder.

Lane then ordered the National Guard to Salisbury and to arrest suspected lynchers. Twelve men were named as being members of the mob that lynched Armwood, and rioting followed, clashing with the National Guard. Four men were tried in Somerset County, but the jury found them guilty and sentenced to life in prison .

== Legacy ==
Esther Popel wrote a widely recognized poem, Flag Salute, in response to the lynching of Armwood. It juxtaposes this murder with quotations from the Pledge of Allegiance.

The Waterbusher is a historical novel written by William L. Thompson in 2010 about the Armwood lynching.
