= Sturgis One Room School =

Building in Maryland, United States

Coordinates: 38°4′32.1″N 75°34′11.75″W

- Interactive map of the Sturgis One Room School area

General information
- Location: 209 Willow Street; Pocomoke City, Maryland, United States
- Completed: 1900

Technical details
- Size: One room

The Sturgis One Room School is a historic U.S. school located at 209 Willow Street, Pocomoke City, Maryland. The community used the One Room School from 1900 to 1937. It was originally known as Sturgis School and was located on Brantley Road. It was moved to its current location in 1996. The school currently serves as The Sturgis One Room School Museum.

== The Sturgis One Room School Museum ==
The Sturgis One Room School Museum illustrates how education was conducted in the local area during the early 20th century.
