= George R. Dennis =

American politician

George Robertson Dennis
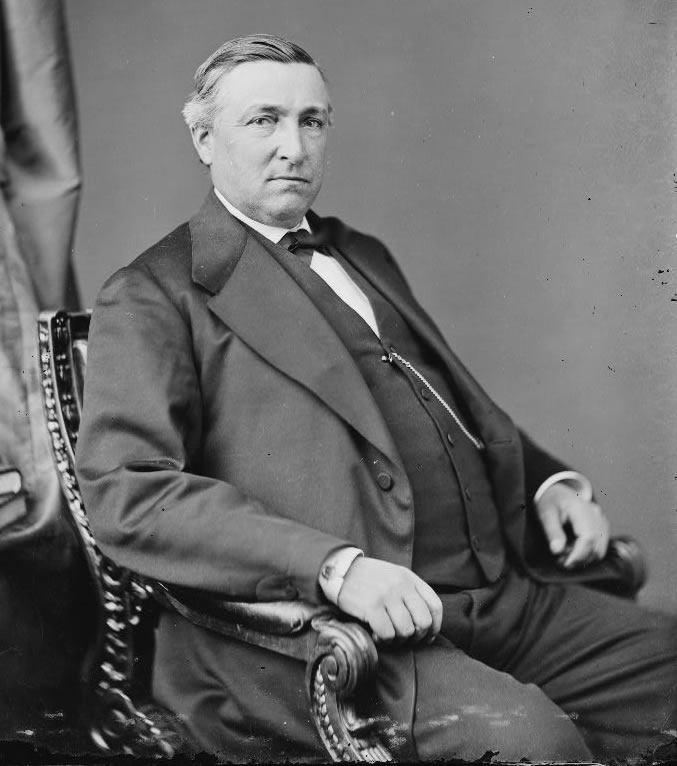

United States Senator from Maryland
- In office March 4, 1873 – March 4, 1879
- Preceded by: George Vickers
- Succeeded by: James B. Groome

Member of the Maryland Senate
- In office 1867

Member of the Maryland House of Delegates
- In office 1854, 1871

Personal details
- Born: April 8, 1822 Whitehaven, Maryland, U.S.
- Died: August 13, 1882 (aged 60) Kingston, Maryland, U.S.
- Resting place: St. Andrew's Churchyard; Princess Anne, Maryland, U.S.
- Party: Democratic
- Relatives: James U. Dennis (brother); Samuel K. Dennis (half-brother)

George Robertson Dennis (April 8, 1822 – August 13, 1882), a Democrat, was a United States Senator from Maryland, serving from 1873 to 1879. He also served in the Maryland State Senate and the Maryland House of Delegates.

== Early life ==
Dennis was born in Whitehaven, Maryland to Maria (née Robertson) and John Upshur Dennis. His brother was James U. Dennis. His half-brother was Samuel K. Dennis. He graduated from Rensselaer Polytechnic Institute in Troy, New York. He entered the University of Virginia at Charlottesville, and studied medicine at the University of Pennsylvania School of Medicine in Philadelphia. He graduated in 1843 and practiced in Kingston, Maryland, for many years, until later devoting himself to agricultural pursuits.

== Career ==
In 1854 and 1871, Dennis served as a member of the Maryland State Senate, and in 1867 served in the Maryland House of Delegates. He was elected as a Democrat to the United States Senate and served from March 4, 1873, until March 3, 1879.

== Personal life ==
He died in Kingston in 1882, and is interred in St. Andrew's Churchyard of Princess Anne, Maryland.

U.S. Senate
Preceded by George Vickers	U.S. senator (Class 3) from Maryland; 1873–1879; Served alongside: William T. Hamilton, William P. Whyte	Succeeded by James B. Groome
