= John Dennis (1807–1859) =

American politician

John Dennis (1807 – November 1, 1859) was an American politician. Born at "Beckford", near Princess Anne, Maryland, he completed preparatory and law studies. After being admitted to the bar, he commenced the practice of law and also engaged in agricultural pursuits. He served in the Maryland House of Delegates from 1835 to 1836, and was elected as a Whig to the Twenty-fifth and Twenty-sixth Congresses, serving from March 4, 1837, to March 3, 1841. He later served as a delegate to the State constitutional convention of 1850. He died at his place of birth, "Beckford".

Dennis was the son of John Dennis (1771–1806) and cousin of Littleton Purnell Dennis, both of whom also represented Maryland in the Congress.

U.S. House of Representatives
Preceded by John Nevett Steele	Member of the U.S. House of Representatives from Maryland's 1st congressional district March 4, 1837 – March 3, 1841	Succeeded by Isaac Dashiell Jones
