= Pocomoke City, Maryland =

- City
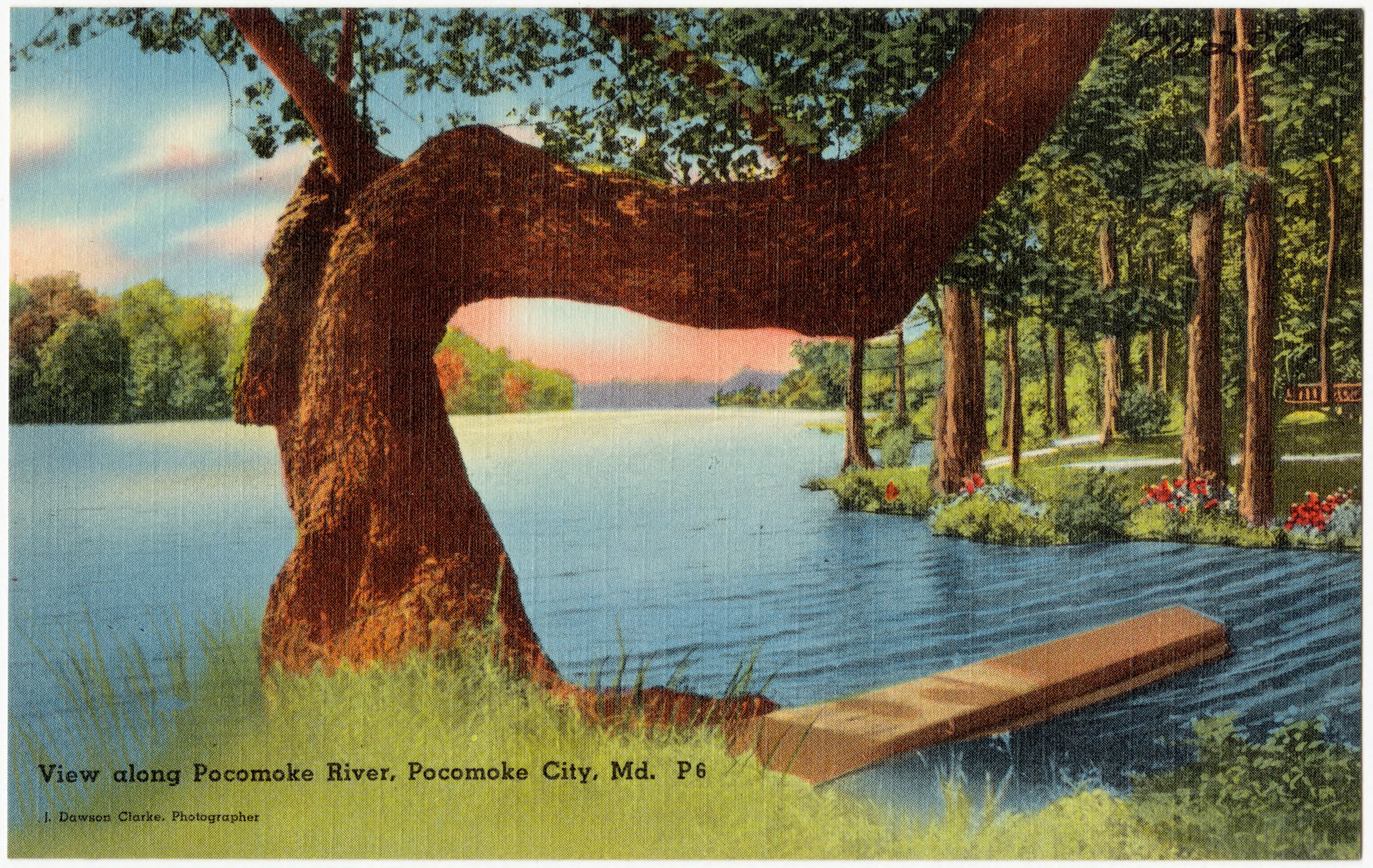

- Flag Seal
- Nickname: Friendliest Town on the Eastern Shore
- Location in Worcester County and the state of Maryland

- Location within the state of Maryland Pocomoke City (the United States)
- Coordinates: 38°4′8″N 75°33′42″W
- Country: United States
- State: Maryland
- County: Worcester
- Incorporated: 1878

Government
  - Mayor: Todd J. Nock

Area
  - Total: 4.03 sq mi (10.45 km^{2})
  - Land: 3.79 sq mi (9.81 km^{2})
  - Water: 0.25 sq mi (0.64 km^{2})
- Elevation: 6.6 ft (2 m)

Population (2020)
  - Total: 4,295
  - Density: 1,133.9/sq mi (437.81/km^{2})
- Time zone: UTC−5 (Eastern (EST))
  - Summer (DST): UTC−4 (EDT)
- ZIP code: 21851
- Area code: 410, 443, 667
- FIPS code: 24-62475
- GNIS feature ID: 0591031
- Website: www.cityofpocomoke.com

Pocomoke City, dubbed "the friendliest town on the Eastern Shore", is a city in Worcester County, Maryland, United States. Although renamed in a burst of civic enthusiasm in 1878, the city is regularly referred to by its inhabitants simply as Pocomoke /ˈpoʊkoʊmoʊk/. The population was 4,295 at the 2020 census. It is part of the Salisbury, Maryland-Delaware Metropolitan Statistical Area. Pocomoke City is a center for commerce on the lower shore, home to an industrial park currently playing host to defense contractors, aerospace engineering, and plastics fabrication. Pocomoke City is located near the Wallops Island Flight Facility in Wallops Island, Virginia.

== History ==
In 1670, Colonel William Stevens established a ferry across the Pocomoke River at the present-day site of the Pocomoke City Bridge. A small settlement called Stevens Ferry (sometimes Stevens Landing) grew at the ferry landing on the south bank of the Pocomoke River. A tobacco warehouse was built just south of Stevens Ferry around 1700 earning the sector the title "Warehouse Landing". The town was first laid out in 1780, at which point it was renamed Newtown. The town was officially incorporated as Newtown (or New Town) in 1865, but was reincorporated in 1878 as Pocomoke City. It was named after the Pocomoke people and Pocomoke River. Pocomoke was believed to mean "black water" but has since been interpreted as "broken ground".

During the city's time as Stevens Landing, and then Newtown, it leveraged its position along the Pocomoke River to grow as a industrial port. Its main exports included tobacco, corn, and furs. Lumber milling was common in Newtown prior to the middle of the 19th century due to the high-quality timber found in nearby forests. The town became known for shipbuilding thanks to an abundant local supply of white oaks. The first sixty-ton vessels were constructed here in 1762. Pocomoke City was recognized as the major shipbuilding center of Worcester County in 1886.

The Eastern Shore Railroad constructed an extension to Newtown in 1871. The Railroad line spanned the Delmarva Peninsula from Delmar, Maryland to Norfolk, Virginia. The line was later absorbed into the New York, Philadelphia, and Norfolk Railroad. In the twentieth century, factories making barrels and baskets for truck crops, and the canning of those crops, aided the town's growth.

Pocomoke City experienced major fires in 1866, 1888, 1892, and 1922. The most recent of these fires destroyed the city's business district and fifty homes on April 17, 1922. The Pocomoke City fire department was able to minimize damage to the town's residential areas thanks to the support of Seaford, Delaware, Snow Hill, Berlin, Crisfield, Cambridge, Salisbury, and Princess Anne fire departments. Nearly all of market street was destroyed in the fire The fire resulted in 1.5 million dollars in damages and 250 residents left homeless.

While truck farming declined during the 1900s, the poultry industry rose to take its place. NASA, the U.S. Navy, and the Coast Guard helped with continued growth by bringing jobs to the area.{{Citation needed}}

Pocomoke City was named an All-America City by the National Municipal League, and for the years 1984–85, Pocomoke City was one of the nine Finalist Communities.

== Culture ==
=== Historic locations ===
The Sturgis One Room School Museum, a one-room schoolhouse, was moved to its present location in the downtown area as a museum of local African-American history. In addition to the MarVa Theater and Costen House, Beverly, Littleton T. Clarke House, Crockett House, Hayward's Lott, Pocomoke City Historic District, Puncheon Mill House, and Young-Sartorius House are listed on the National Register of Historic Places.

The 1920 drawbridge across the Pocomoke River

=== Museums and arts ===
Pocomoke City is home to the Delmarva Discovery Museum, an interactive museum focusing on local ecology and history, and The Isaac Costen House Museum. The MarVa Theater is a 1927 Art Deco auditorium known for its superior acoustics, and is being restored as a regional center for the performing arts.

=== Sports ===
In the past, Pocomoke City held a franchise in the Eastern Shore Baseball League, at times hosting the Salamanders, the Red Sox, and the Chicks.

== Notable murders ==
On June 14, 1906, the city was the site of a lynching. A farmhand named Edd Watson was murdered by a mob.

In October 1933, George Armwood, a Pocomoke City man was taken from a jail cell in nearby Princess Anne and killed by a mob.

== Education ==
Three Worcester County Public Schools are located in Pocomoke City: Pocomoke Elementary, Pocomoke Middle, and Pocomoke High. Both the elementary and high schools are named a Blue Ribbon School.

== Geography ==
Pocomoke City is located at 38°4′8″N 75°33′42″W (38.068904, -75.561718).

According to the United States Census Bureau, the city has a total area of 3.94 square miles (10.20 km^{2}), of which 3.69 square miles (9.56 km^{2}) is land and 0.25 square miles (0.65 km^{2}) is water.

=== Climate ===
Its climate is characterized by hot and humid stretches of weather in summer, but they are often broken up by cold fronts from the north offering several days of mild temperatures. Both spring and fall are pleasant with cool to mild temperatures and lower humidity. Winters are relatively mild compared to areas to the north and northwest, but cold spells send temperatures well below freezing. Due to the impact of the Atlantic Ocean nearby, average snowfall amounts only range from 5 to 10 inches (130 to 250 mm); however, this varies considerably from year to year and occasional nor'easters can produce significant snowfalls over one foot (30 cm). The Blizzard of 2018, for example, produced 10 to 15 inches (250 to 380 mm) of snow, temperatures in teens, and winds gusting over 40 mph (64 km/h). Tropical storms occasionally impact the region during summer and fall.

The Köppen climate classification subtype for this climate is "Cfa" (Humid Subtropical Climate).

Climate data for Pocomoke City, Maryland
| Month | Jan | Feb | Mar | Apr | May | Jun | Jul | Aug | Sep | Oct | Nov | Dec | Year |
|---|---|---|---|---|---|---|---|---|---|---|---|---|---|
| Mean daily maximum °C (°F) | 8 (47) | 9 (48) | 13 (56) | 19 (66) | 24 (75) | 28 (83) | 31 (87) | 29 (85) | 27 (80) | 21 (70) | 15 (59) | 10 (50) | 19 (67) |
| Mean daily minimum °C (°F) | −2 (29) | −2 (28) | 2 (35) | 7 (44) | 12 (53) | 17 (62) | 19 (67) | 19 (66) | 15 (59) | 9 (48) | 4 (39) | −1 (31) | 8 (47) |
| Average precipitation mm (inches) | 79 (3.1) | 81 (3.2) | 100 (4) | 79 (3.1) | 79 (3.1) | 86 (3.4) | 100 (4.1) | 120 (4.9) | 89 (3.5) | 86 (3.4) | 69 (2.7) | 89 (3.5) | 1,100 (42) |
| Average precipitation days | 9 | 8 | 10 | 8 | 9 | 8 | 9 | 8 | 6 | 6 | 7 | 9 | 95 |
Source: Weatherbase

== Municipal status ==
References to the municipality's status as a city or town varies according to sources. The Census Bureau accounts Pocomoke City a city, while official state documents differ. According to the Maryland State Archives, many more official documents refer to the "Town of Pocomoke City" than to the "City of Pocomoke City." The most recent references to the "Town" are from 1963, however, while the most recent references to the "City", which come from its Charter, are from 1990. Other sources also differ: the Maryland Manual Online calls it as a city, while the Maryland Municipal League speaks of it as a town. While cities and towns are significantly different in some states, Maryland's cities and towns, classed simply as "municipalities", are treated equally in state law.

== Demographics ==
Historical population
| Census | Pop. | Note | %± |
|---|---|---|---|
| 1870 | 1,195 | | — |
| 1880 | 1,425 | | 19.2% |
| 1890 | 1,866 | | 30.9% |
| 1900 | 2,124 | | 13.8% |
| 1910 | 2,369 | | 11.5% |
| 1920 | 2,444 | | 3.2% |
| 1930 | 2,609 | | 6.8% |
| 1940 | 2,739 | | 5.0% |
| 1950 | 3,191 | | 16.5% |
| 1960 | 3,329 | | 4.3% |
| 1970 | 3,573 | | 7.3% |
| 1980 | 3,558 | | −0.4% |
| 1990 | 3,922 | | 10.2% |
| 2000 | 4,098 | | 4.5% |
| 2010 | 4,179 | | 2.0% |
| 2020 | 4,295 | | 2.8% |
U.S. Decennial Census

=== 2020 census ===
As of the 2020 census, Pocomoke City had a population of 4,295. The median age was 36.9 years. 26.9% of residents were under the age of 18 and 18.1% of residents were 65 years of age or older. For every 100 females there were 82.8 males, and for every 100 females age 18 and over there were 73.0 males age 18 and over.

0.0% of residents lived in urban areas, while 100.0% lived in rural areas.

There were 1,681 households in Pocomoke City, of which 37.5% had children under the age of 18 living in them. Of all households, 32.1% were married-couple households, 17.3% were households with a male householder and no spouse or partner present, and 44.0% were households with a female householder and no spouse or partner present. About 29.4% of all households were made up of individuals and 17.3% had someone living alone who was 65 years of age or older.

There were 1,883 housing units, of which 10.7% were vacant. The homeowner vacancy rate was 7.3% and the rental vacancy rate was 6.3%.

Racial composition as of the 2020 census
| Race | Number | Percent |
|---|---|---|
| White | 1,890 | 44.0% |
| Black or African American | 1,993 | 46.4% |
| American Indian and Alaska Native | 26 | 0.6% |
| Asian | 55 | 1.3% |
| Native Hawaiian and Other Pacific Islander | 0 | 0.0% |
| Some other race | 65 | 1.5% |
| Two or more races | 266 | 6.2% |
| Hispanic or Latino (of any race) | 174 | 4.1% |

=== 2010 census ===
As of the census of 2010, there were 4,184 people, 1,626 households, and 1,076 families living in the city. The population density was 1,133.9 inhabitants per square mile (437.8/km^{2}). There were 1,894 housing units at an average density of 513.3 per square mile (198.2/km^{2}). The racial makeup of the city was 49.5% White, 45.8% African American, 0.5% Native American, 1.3% Asian, 1.0% from other races, and 2.0% from two or more races. Hispanic or Latino of any race were 2.5% of the population.

There were 1,626 households, of which 38.7% had children under the age of 18 living with them, 35.5% were married couples living together, 24.9% had a female householder with no husband present, 5.8% had a male householder with no wife present, and 33.8% were non-families. 29.6% of all households were made up of individuals, and 14% had someone living alone who was 65 years of age or older. The average household size was 2.52 and the average family size was 3.10.

The median age in the city was 36.4 years. 27.8% of residents were under the age of 18; 9.2% were between the ages of 18 and 24; 23.4% were from 25 to 44; 24.4% were from 45 to 64; and 15.2% were 65 years of age or older. The gender makeup of the city was 55.6% female and 44.4% male.

=== 2000 census ===
As of the census of 2000, there were 4,098 people, 1,596 households, and 1,058 families living in the city. The population density was 1,346.5 inhabitants per square mile (519.9/km^{2}). There were 1,764 housing units at an average density of 579.6 per square mile (223.8/km^{2}). The racial makeup of the city was 50.73% White, 46.36% African American, 0.46% Native American, 0.46% Asian, 0.02% Pacific Islander, 0.34% from other races, and 1.61% from two or more races. Hispanic or Latino of any race were 1.05% of the population.

There were 1,596 households, out of which 35.8% had children under the age of 18 living with them, 38.6% were married couples living together, 24.0% had a female householder with no husband present, and 33.7% were non-families. 29.9% of all households were made up of individuals, and 16.8% had someone living alone who was 65 years of age or older. The average household size was 2.51 and the average family size was 3.11.

In the city, the age distribution of the population shows 30.5% under the age of 18, 7.8% from 18 to 24, 26.7% from 25 to 44, 19.1% from 45 to 64, and 16.0% who were 65 years of age or older. The median age was 36 years. For every 100 females, there were 83.6 males. For every 100 females age 18 and over, there were 74.7 males.

The median income for a household in the city was $28,938, and the median income for a family was $34,722. Males had a median income of $32,175 versus $19,362 for females. The per capita income for the city was $17,301. About 13.6% of families and 18.3% of the population were below the poverty line, including 31.8% of those under age 18 and 13.2% of those age 65 or over.

== Notable people ==
- George Armwood (–1933), victim of last recorded lynching in Maryland lived in Pocomoke City.
- Hugh Latimer Dryden (1898–1965), director of NACA (1947–1958) and Deputy Administrator of NASA (1958-1965) was born in Pocomoke City.
- Anna Ella Carroll (1815-1894), political writer and theorist who published numerous books and articles in the 1860s including: “The Great American Battle,” and “The War Powers Of The General Government." Throughout the Civil War, she worked as an unofficial member of Lincoln’s cabinet, as it was believed publicizing a woman's contributions to military strategy could be controversial. Carroll's reports to President Lincoln led to the development of critical military strategy and Congress passed a bill in 1881 to compensate her for the "important military service rendered by her during the late Civil War."

== Controversy ==
Pocomoke City was the subject of a 2019 documentary, The Friendliest Town, which investigated the abrupt and unexplained firing in 2015 of the town's first Black police chief, Kelvin Sewell. Sewell subsequently filed suit in federal court together with former lieutenant Lynell Green and former detective Franklin Savage, alleging a pattern of "rampant racial discrimination and retaliation" by city, county, and state officials. In 2019, Pocomoke City agreed to settle Sewell and Green's federal lawsuits, and the town entered a consent decree requiring it to reform its policies and procedures around policing.
