= Beverly (Pocomoke City, Maryland) =

Historic house in Maryland

- U.S. National Register of Historic Places
- Location within Maryland Location within the United States
- Location: Colona Road, Pocomoke City, Maryland
- Coordinates: 38°0′25″N 75°37′7″W
- Area: 45.9 acres (18.6 ha)
- Built: 1770
- Architect: Littleton Dennis
- Architectural style: Georgian
- NRHP reference No.: 75000933
- Added to NRHP: October 29, 1975

Beverly is a historic home located in Pocomoke City, Worcester County, Maryland, United States. It is a 2 1/2-story, Georgian-style Flemish bond brick house built about 1770. The house faces the Pocomoke River. An original circular ice house survives on the property.

Beverly was listed on the National Register of Historic Places in 1975.

Littleton Dennis, great-great-grandson of John Dennis of Beverly England, died in 1774 before the house was finished but work went on and was completed by his widow Susanna Upshur Dennis and their children and their descendants lived in the house for nearly 150 years.
