= 1892 United States House of Representatives elections in South Carolina =

The 1892 United States House of Representatives elections in South Carolina were held on November 8, 1892, to select seven Representatives for two-year terms from the state of South Carolina. Two Democratic incumbents were re-elected, four open seats were won by the Democrats and the open seat in the 7th congressional district was picked up by the Republicans. The composition of the state delegation after the election was six Democrats and one Republican.

== 1st congressional district ==
Incumbent Democratic Congressman William H. Brawley of the 1st congressional district, in office since 1891, defeated J. William Stokes in the Democratic primary and was unopposed in the general election.

=== Democratic primary ===
Democratic primary
Candidate	Votes	%
William H. Brawley	6,328	53.6
J. William Stokes	5,486	46.4

=== General election results ===
South Carolina's 1st congressional district election results, 1892
Party	Candidate	Votes	%	±%
Democratic	William H. Brawley (incumbent)	6,318	99.8	+15.6
No party	Write-Ins	15	0.2	+0.1
Majority		6,303	99.6	+31.1
Turnout		6,333		
Democratic hold				

== 2nd congressional district ==
Incumbent Democratic Congressman George D. Tillman of the 2nd congressional district, in office since 1883, was defeated in the Democratic primary by W. Jasper Talbert. He was unopposed in the general election.

=== Democratic primary ===
Democratic primary
Candidate	Votes	%
George D. Tillman	4,642	39.6
W. Jasper Talbert	3,979	34.0
Robert Aldrich	2,745	23.4
John T. Gaston	356	3.0

Democratic primary runoff
Candidate	Votes	%	±%
W. Jasper Talbert	5,652	56.1	+22.1
George D. Tillman	4,416	43.9	+4.3

=== General election results ===
South Carolina's 2nd congressional district election results, 1892
Party	Candidate	Votes	%	±%
Democratic	W. Jasper Talbert	8,001	99.6	+14.1
No party	Write-Ins	30	0.4	+0.2
Majority		7,971	99.2	+28.0
Turnout		8,031		
Democratic hold				

== 3rd congressional district ==
Incumbent Democratic Congressman George Johnstone of the 3rd congressional district, in office since 1891, was defeated in the Democratic primary by Asbury Latimer. He defeated John R. Tolbert in the general election.

=== Democratic primary ===
Democratic primary
Candidate	Votes	%
Asbury Latimer	7,355	52.8
George Johnstone	6,566	47.2

=== General election results ===
South Carolina's 3rd congressional district election results, 1892
Party	Candidate	Votes	%	±%
Democratic	Asbury Latimer	8,330	91.2	−0.2
Republican	John R. Tolbert	787	8.6	+0.4
No party	Write-Ins	17	0.2	−0.2
Majority		7,543	82.6	−0.6
Turnout		9,134		
Democratic hold				

== 4th congressional district ==
Incumbent Democratic Congressman George W. Shell of the 4th congressional district, in office since 1891, defeated Joseph T. Johnson in the Democratic primary and Republican Joshua A.T. Ensor in the general election.

=== Democratic primary ===
Democratic primary
Candidate	Votes	%
George W. Shell	10,585	59.5
Joseph T. Johnson	7,219	40.5

=== General election results ===
South Carolina's 4th congressional district election results, 1892
Party	Candidate	Votes	%	±%
Democratic	George W. Shell (incumbent)	10,401	85.7	+3.8
Republican	Joshua A.T. Ensor	1,730	14.3	−3.5
No party	Write-Ins	6	0.0	−0.3
Majority		8,671	71.4	+7.3
Turnout		12,137		
Democratic hold				

== 5th congressional district ==
Incumbent Democratic Congressman John J. Hemphill of the 5th congressional district, in office since 1883, was defeated in the Democratic primary by Thomas J. Strait. He defeated Republican challenger E. Brooks Sligh in the general election.

=== Democratic primary ===
Democratic primary
Candidate	Votes	%
Thomas J. Strait	6,141	50.7
John J. Hemphill	5,968	49.3

=== General election results ===
South Carolina's 5th congressional district election results, 1892
Party	Candidate	Votes	%	±%
Democratic	Thomas J. Strait	8,791	80.7	−6.4
Republican	E. Brooks Sligh	2,099	19.3	+7.1
Majority		6,692	61.4	−13.5
Turnout		10,890		
Democratic hold				

== 6th congressional district special election ==
Incumbent Democratic Congressman Eli T. Stackhouse of the 6th congressional district, in office since 1891, died on June 14, 1892, during the Democratic primary campaign. A special election for the remainder of the term was called to be held simultaneously with the regular election. The South Carolina Democratic Party decided that the winner of the primary election would be their candidate for both the special and regular elections. John L. McLaurin won the primary and defeated Republican challenger E.J. Sawyer in the general election.

=== Democratic primary ===
Democratic primary
Candidate	Votes	%
John L. McLaurin	8,269	61.2
Jeremiah Smith	4,941	36.6
L.S. Bigham	297	2.2

=== General election results ===
South Carolina's 6th congressional district special election results, 1892
Party	Candidate	Votes	%	±%
Democratic	John L. McLaurin	8,572	90.2	+11.4
Republican	E.J. Sawyer	934	9.8	−10.7
Majority		7,638	80.4	+22.1
Turnout		9,506		
Democratic hold				

== 6th congressional district ==
John L. McLaurin, winner of the Democratic primary for both the special and regular election of the 6th congressional district, defeated Republican challenger E.J. Sawyer in the general election to win the term for the 53rd Congress.

=== General election results ===
South Carolina's 6th congressional district election results, 1892
Party	Candidate	Votes	%	±%
Democratic	John L. McLaurin	10,133	84.6	−5.6
Republican	E.J. Sawyer	1,832	15.3	+5.5
No party	Write-Ins	12	0.1	+0.1
Majority		8,301	69.3	−11.1
Turnout		11,977		
Democratic hold				

== 7th congressional district ==
Incumbent Democratic Congressman William Elliott of the 7th congressional district, in office since 1891, declined to seek re-election. Republican George W. Murray defeated Democratic challenger E.W. Moise in the general election.

=== Democratic primary ===
Democratic primary
Candidate	Votes	%
E.W. Moise	3,607	53.0
W.H. Heyward	3,196	47.0

=== General election results ===
South Carolina's 7th congressional district election results, 1892
Party	Candidate	Votes	%	±%
Republican	George W. Murray	4,995	50.0	+11.2
Democratic	E.W. Moise	4,955	49.6	+5.2
No party	Write-Ins	42	0.4	+0.1
Majority		40	0.4	−5.2
Turnout		9,992		
Republican gain from Democratic				

== See also ==
- United States House of Representatives elections, 1892
- South Carolina gubernatorial election, 1892
- South Carolina's congressional districts
