= 1903 United States Senate election in South Carolina =

1903 Democratic Senate primary runoff in South Carolina
- September 9, 1902
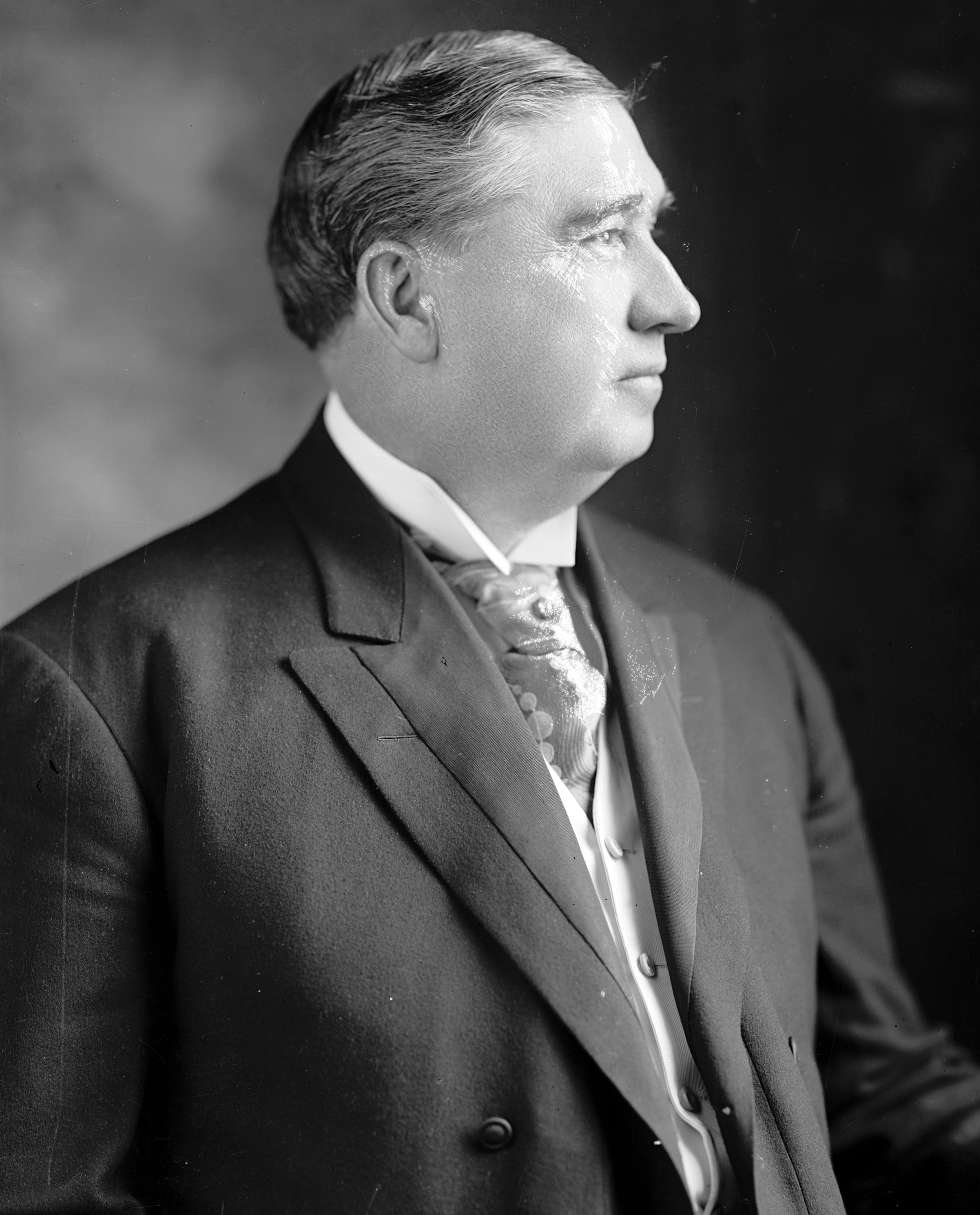

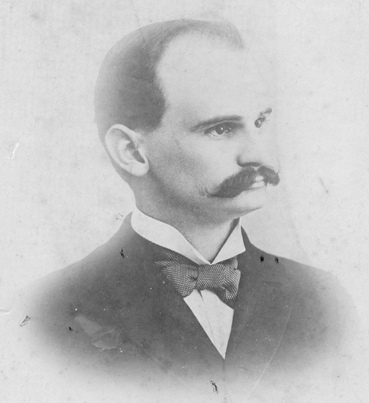
Nominee	Asbury Latimer	John Gary Evans
Party	Democratic	Democratic
Popular vote	53,890	36,371
Percentage	59.7%	40.3%
- County results Latimer: 50–60% 60–70% 70–80% Evans: 50–60% 60–70%
U.S. senator before election
John L. McLaurin
Democratic
Elected U.S. Senator
Asbury Latimer
Democratic

The 1903 South Carolina United States Senate election, held January 27, 1903 to select the U.S. senator from the state of South Carolina, was predetermined by the Democratic Party primary election held on August 26, 1902, and September 9. Democrats were so overwhelmingly dominant that their nomination was tantamount to the general election.

Prior to the ratification of the 17th Amendment to the United States Constitution, U.S. senators were elected by the state legislature and not through the direct election by the people of the state. However, the Democratic Party of South Carolina organized primary elections for the U.S. Senate beginning in 1896 and the General Assembly would confirm the choice of the Democratic voters. Tillmanite Democrat Asbury Latimer won the Democratic primary and was elected by the General Assembly for a six-year term.

== Democratic primary ==
=== Candidates ===
- William Elliott, U.S. Representative from Beaufort
- John Gary Evans, former Governor of South Carolina
- John J. Hemphill, former U.S. Representative from Chester
- Dan S. Henderson
- George Johnstone, former U.S. Representative from Newberry County
- Asbury Latimer, U.S. Representative from Belton

=== Campaign ===
In the special election of 1897, the Conservatives were without a candidate so in 1902 four candidates vied for the support of Conservatives: Dan S. Henderson, William Elliott, George Johnstone and John J. Hemphill. The two remaining candidates in the race, Representative Asbury Latimer and former Governor John Gary Evans, were strong Tillmanites. However, they held strongly opposing views and a duel almost ensued between the two while campaigning at St. George on July 12. A fight did indeed break out between Latimer and Hemphill when they were campaigning in Gaffney on August 14. Latimer took offence to an accusation by Hemphill and struck him. Hemphill was unable to strike back because Latimer quickly left the scene.

On August 26, Latimer and Evans emerged as the top two candidates in the field and were to face each other in a runoff election on September 9. The Conservative candidates had garnered more votes combined than the combined vote of Latimer and Evans, but their inability to coalesce around a single candidate prevented a Conservative from winning the election. Evans was widely disliked by Conservatives in the state so they threw their support behind Latimer and he easily won the runoff election.

=== Results ===
Democratic Primary
Candidate	Votes	%
Asbury Latimer	22,971	24.1
John Gary Evans	17,993	18.9
Dan S. Henderson	13,771	14.5
William Elliott	13,658	14.4
George Johnstone	13,556	14.2
John J. Hemphill	13,261	13.9

Democratic Primary Runoff
Candidate	Votes	%	±%
Asbury Latimer	53,890	59.7	+35.6
John Gary Evans	36,371	40.3	+21.4

== See also ==
- List of United States senators from South Carolina
- 1902 and 1903 United States Senate elections
- 1902 United States House of Representatives elections in South Carolina
- 1902 South Carolina gubernatorial election
