= 55th United States Congress =

1897-1899 U.S. Congress

←	54th	56th	→
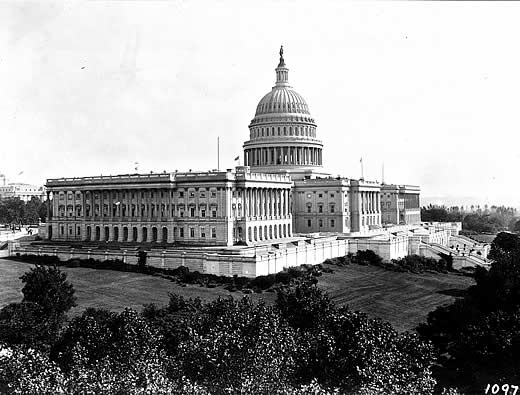
- United States Capitol (1906)

Overview
- Legislative body: United States Congress
- Jurisdiction: United States
- Term: March 4, 1897 – March 4, 1899

Senate
- Members: 90
- President: Garret Hobart (R)
- President pro tempore: William P. Frye (R)
- Party control: Republican (plurality)

House of Representatives
- Members: 357 representatives 3 non-voting delegates
- Speaker: Thomas B. Reed (R)
- Party control: Republican

Sessions
- Special (Note: Special session of the Senate.): March 4, 1897 – March 10, 1897
- 1st: March 15, 1897 – July 24, 1897
- 2nd: December 6, 1897 – July 8, 1898
- 3rd: December 5, 1898 – March 3, 1899

The 55th United States Congress was a meeting of the legislative branch of the United States federal government, composed of the United States Senate and the United States House of Representatives. It met in Washington, D.C., from March 4, 1897, to March 4, 1899, during the first two years of William McKinley's presidency. The apportionment of seats in the House of Representatives was based on the 1890 United States census. Both chambers had a Republican majority. There was one African-American member, George Henry White, a Republican from the state of North Carolina, and one Kaw member, Charles Curtis, a Republican from Kansas.

== Major events ==
- March 4, 1897: William McKinley became President of the United States.
- February 15, 1898: Spanish–American War: USS Maine exploded in Havana harbor.
- December 10, 1898: Treaty of Paris ended Spanish–American War, 30 Stat. 1754.

== Major legislation ==
- July 24, 1897: Dingley tariff, ch. 11, 30 Stat. 151, increased trade duties for revenue and protection
- April 20, 1898: Teller Resolution (Cuba), 30 Stat. 738
- April 25, 1898: United States declaration of war upon Spain (Spanish–American War), 30 Stat. 364
- June 1, 1898: Erdman Act, 30 Stat. 424
- June 13, 1898: War Revenue Act of 1898, 30 Stat. 448
- June 28, 1898: Curtis Act of 1898, 30 Stat. 495, authorized the mass dispossession of territory from the Cherokee Nation, Chickasaw Nation, Choctaw Nation, Muscogee Nation, and Seminole Nation and the divestiture of power from their national governments.
- July 1, 1898: Bankruptcy Act of 1898 (Henderson-Nelson Act), ch. 541, 30 Stat. 544, gave companies an option of gaining protection from creditors.
- July 7, 1898: Newlands Resolution, No. 55, 30 Stat. 750, authorized the annexation of the Republic of Hawaii
- March 3, 1899: Rivers and Harbors Act of 1899, Ch. 425, 33 Stat. 401, § 9, 30 Stat. 1151

== Treaties ratified ==
- February 6, 1899: Treaty of Paris, ending the Spanish–American War. Guam, the Philippines, and Puerto Rico became possessions of the U.S.

== Party summary ==
The count below identifies party affiliations at the beginning of the first session of this Congress, and includes members from vacancies and newly admitted states, when they were first seated. Changes resulting from subsequent replacements are shown below in the "Changes in membership" section.

=== Senate ===
Senate composition by state 2 Democrats (12 states) 2 Republicans (14 states) 2 Silver (1 state) 1 Democrat and 1 Republican (9 states) 1 Republican and 1 Silver-Republican (5 states) 1 Republican and 1 Populist (3 states) 1 Populist and 1 Silver-Republican (1 state)

	Party (shading shows control)					Total	Vacant
	Democratic (D)	Populist (P)	Republican (R)	Silver Republican (SR)	Silver (S)	Total	Vacant
End of previous congress	40	4	44	0	2	90	0
Begin	33	5	43	5	2	88	2
End	34	5	44	5	2	90	0
Final voting share	37.8%	5.6%	48.9%	5.6%	2.2%		
Beginning of next congress	26	4	51	3	2	86	4

=== House of Representatives ===
	Party (shading shows control)						Total	Vacant
	Democratic (D)	Populist (P)	Republican (R)	Independent Republican (IR)	Silver Republican (SR)	Silver (S)	Total	Vacant
End of previous congress	94	9	252	0	1	0	356	1
Begin	126	22	202	1	3	1	355	2
End	122	22	201	1	3	1	350	7
Final voting share	34.9%	6.3%	57.4%	0.3%	0.9%	0.3%		
Beginning of next congress	163	6	183	0	2	1	355	2

== Leadership ==
=== Senate ===
- President: Garret Hobart (R)
- President pro tempore: William P. Frye (R)
- Republican Conference Chairman: William B. Allison
- Democratic Caucus Chairman: Arthur Pue Gorman, until 1898
  - David Turpie, afterwards

=== House of Representatives ===
- Speaker: Thomas Brackett Reed (R)
- Minority Leader: Joseph W. Bailey
- Republican Conference Chairman: Charles H. Grosvenor
- Republican Campaign Committee Chairman: Joseph W. Babcock
- Democratic Caucus Chairman: James D. Richardson
- Democratic Campaign Committee Chairman: Charles James Faulkner

== Members ==
This list is arranged by chamber, then by state. Senators are listed by class, and representatives are listed by district.

Skip to House of Representatives, below

=== Senate ===
Senators were elected by the state legislatures every two years, with one-third beginning new six-year terms with each Congress. Preceding the names in the list below are Senate class numbers, which indicate the cycle of their election. In this Congress, Class 1 meant their term ended with this Congress, requiring re-election in 1898; Class 2 meant their term began in the last Congress, requiring re-election in 1900; and Class 3 meant their term began in this Congress, requiring re-election in 1902.

==== Alabama ====
▌2. John T. Morgan (D)
▌3. Edmund Pettus (D)

==== Arkansas ====
▌2. James H. Berry (D)
▌3. James K. Jones (D)

==== California ====
▌1. Stephen M. White (D)
▌3. George C. Perkins (R)

==== Colorado ====
▌2. Edward O. Wolcott (R)
▌3. Henry M. Teller (SR)

==== Connecticut ====
▌1. Joseph R. Hawley (R)
▌3. Orville H. Platt (R)

==== Delaware ====
▌1. George Gray (D)
▌2. Richard R. Kenney (D)

==== Florida ====
▌1. Samuel Pasco (D)
▌3. Stephen R. Mallory (D), from May 14, 1897

==== Georgia ====
▌2. Augustus O. Bacon (D)
▌3. Alexander S. Clay (D)

==== Idaho ====
▌2. George L. Shoup (R)
▌3. Henry Heitfeld (P)

==== Illinois ====
▌2. Shelby M. Cullom (R)
▌3. William E. Mason (R)

==== Indiana ====
▌1. David Turpie (D)
▌3. Charles W. Fairbanks (R)

==== Iowa ====
▌2 John H. Gear (R)
▌3. William B. Allison (R)

==== Kansas ====
▌2. Lucien Baker (R)
▌3. William A. Harris (P)

==== Kentucky ====
▌2. William Lindsay (D)
▌3. William J. Deboe (R)

==== Louisiana ====
▌2. Donelson Caffery (D)
▌3. Samuel D. McEnery (D)

==== Maine ====
▌1. Eugene Hale (R)
▌2. William P. Frye (R)

==== Maryland ====
▌1. Arthur Pue Gorman (D)
▌3. George L. Wellington (R)

==== Massachusetts ====
▌1. Henry Cabot Lodge (R)
▌2. George F. Hoar (R)

==== Michigan ====
▌1. Julius C. Burrows (R)
▌2. James McMillan (R)

==== Minnesota ====
▌1. Cushman K. Davis (R)
▌2. Knute Nelson (R)

==== Mississippi ====
▌1. James Z. George (D), until August 14, 1897

▌Hernando D. Money (D), from October 8, 1897

▌2. Edward C. Walthall (D), until April 21, 1898

▌William V. Sullivan (D), from May 31, 1898

==== Missouri ====
▌1. Francis Cockrell (D)
▌3. George G. Vest (D)

==== Montana ====
▌1. Lee Mantle (SR)
▌2. Thomas H. Carter (R)

==== Nebraska ====
▌1. William V. Allen (P)
▌2. John M. Thurston (R)

==== Nevada ====
▌1. William M. Stewart (S)
▌3. John P. Jones (S)

==== New Hampshire ====
▌2. William E. Chandler (R)
▌3. Jacob H. Gallinger (R)

==== New Jersey ====
▌1. James Smith Jr. (D)
▌2. William J. Sewell (R)

==== New York ====
▌1. Edward Murphy Jr. (D)
▌3. Thomas C. Platt (R)

==== North Carolina ====
▌2. Marion Butler (P)
▌3. Jeter C. Pritchard (R)

==== North Dakota ====
▌1. William N. Roach (D)
▌3. Henry C. Hansbrough (R)

==== Ohio ====
▌1. John Sherman (R), until March 4, 1897

▌Marcus A. Hanna (R), from March 5, 1897

▌3. Joseph B. Foraker (R)

==== Oregon ====
▌2. George W. McBride (R)
▌3. Joseph Simon (R), from October 7, 1898

==== Pennsylvania ====
▌1. Matthew S. Quay (R)
▌3. Boies Penrose (R)

==== Rhode Island ====
▌1. Nelson W. Aldrich (R)
▌2. George P. Wetmore (R)

==== South Carolina ====
▌2. Benjamin R. Tillman (D)
▌3. Joseph H. Earle (D), until May 20, 1897

▌John L. McLaurin (D), from June 1, 1897

==== South Dakota ====
▌2. Richard F. Pettigrew (SR)
▌3. James H. Kyle (P)

==== Tennessee ====
▌1. William B. Bate (D)
▌2. Isham G. Harris (D), until July 8, 1897

▌Thomas B. Turley (D), from July 20, 1897

==== Texas ====
▌1. Roger Q. Mills (D)
▌2. Horace Chilton (D)

==== Utah ====
▌1. Frank J. Cannon (SR)
▌3. Joseph L. Rawlins (D)

==== Vermont ====
▌1. Redfield Proctor (R)
▌3. Justin S. Morrill (R), until December 28, 1898

▌Jonathan Ross (R), from January 11, 1899

==== Virginia ====
▌1. John W. Daniel (D)
▌2. Thomas S. Martin (D)

==== Washington ====
▌1. John L. Wilson (R)
▌3. George Turner (SR)

==== West Virginia ====
▌1. Charles J. Faulkner Jr. (D)
▌2. Stephen B. Elkins (R)

==== Wisconsin ====
▌1. John L. Mitchell (D)
▌3. John C. Spooner (R)

==== Wyoming ====
▌1. Clarence D. Clark (R)
▌2. Francis E. Warren (R)

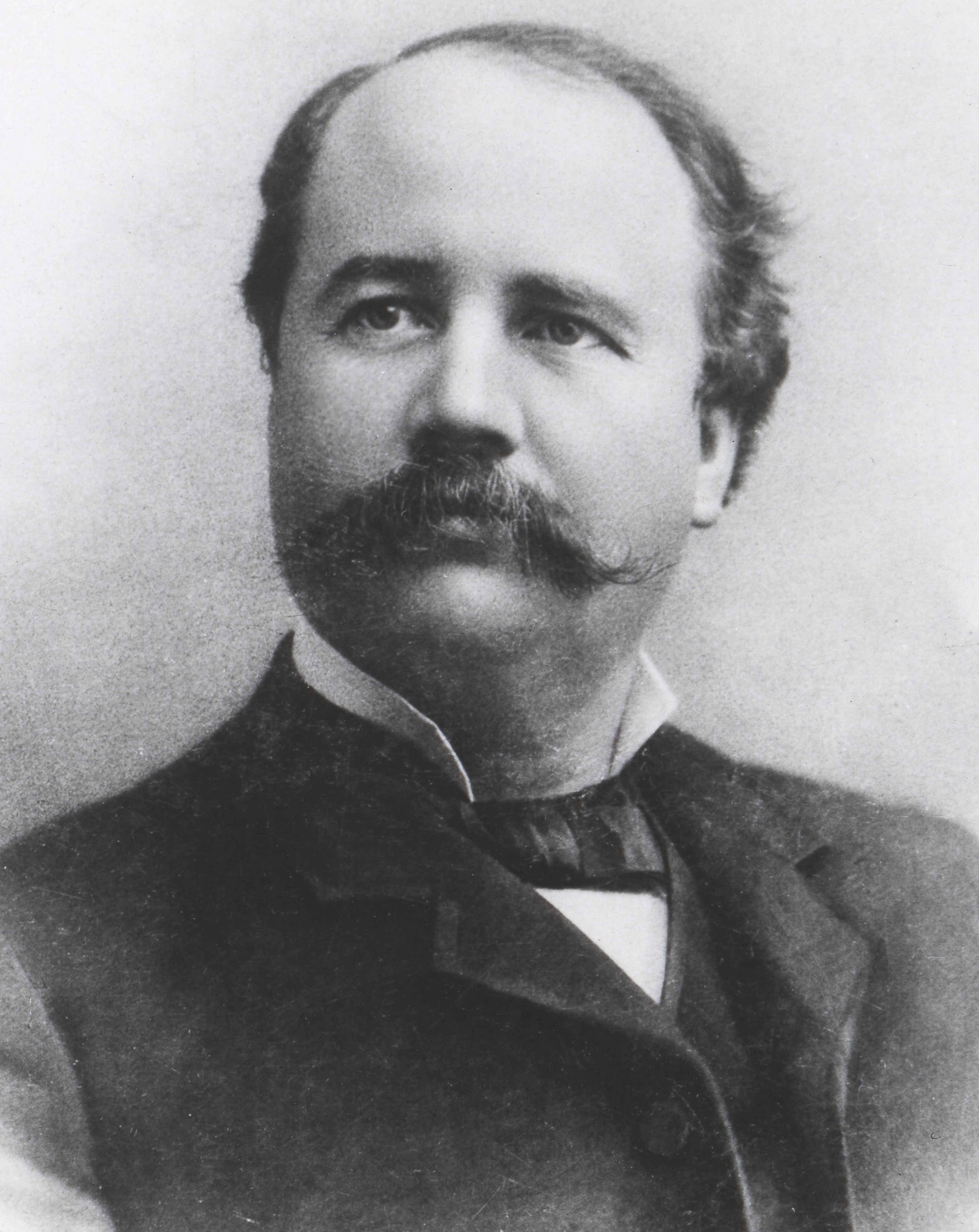
President of the Senate Garret Hobart

=== House of Representatives ===
The names of representatives are preceded by their district numbers.

==== Alabama ====
▌1. George W. Taylor (D)
▌2. Jesse F. Stallings (D)
▌3. Henry D. Clayton (D)
▌4. Thomas S. Plowman (D), until February 9, 1898

▌William F. Aldrich (R), from February 9, 1898

▌5. Willis Brewer (D)
▌6. John H. Bankhead (D)
▌7. Milford W. Howard (P)
▌8. Joseph Wheeler (D)
▌9. Oscar Underwood (D)

==== Arkansas ====
▌1. Philip D. McCulloch Jr. (D)
▌2. John S. Little (D)
▌3. Thomas C. McRae (D)
▌4. William L. Terry (D)
▌5. Hugh A. Dinsmore (D)
▌6. Stephen Brundidge Jr. (D)

==== California ====
▌1. John A. Barham (R)
▌2. Marion De Vries (D)
▌3. Samuel G. Hilborn (R)
▌4. James G. Maguire (D)
▌5. Eugene F. Loud (R)
▌6. Charles A. Barlow (P)
▌7. Curtis H. Castle (P)

==== Colorado ====
▌1. John F. Shafroth (SR)
▌2. John C. Bell (P)

==== Connecticut ====
▌1. E. Stevens Henry (R)
▌2. Nehemiah D. Sperry (R)
▌3. Charles A. Russell (R)
▌4. Ebenezer J. Hill (R)

==== Delaware ====
▌At-large. L. Irving Handy (D)

==== Florida ====
▌1. Stephen M. Sparkman (D)
▌2. Robert W. Davis (D)

==== Georgia ====
▌1. Rufus E. Lester (D)
▌2. James M. Griggs (D)
▌3. Elijah B. Lewis (D)
▌4. William C. Adamson (D)
▌5. Leonidas F. Livingston (D)
▌6. Charles L. Bartlett (D)
▌7. John W. Maddox (D)
▌8. William M. Howard (D)
▌9. Farish C. Tate (D)
▌10. William H. Fleming (D)
▌11. William G. Brantley (D)

==== Idaho ====
▌At-large. James Gunn (P)

==== Illinois ====
▌1. James R. Mann (R)
▌2. William Lorimer (R)
▌3. Hugh R. Belknap (R)
▌4. Daniel W. Mills (R)
▌5. George E. White (R)
▌6. Edward D. Cooke (R), until June 24, 1897

▌Henry S. Boutell (R), from November 23, 1897

▌7. George E. Foss (R)
▌8. Albert J. Hopkins (R)
▌9. Robert R. Hitt (R)
▌10. George W. Prince (R)
▌11. Walter Reeves (R)
▌12. Joseph G. Cannon (R)
▌13. Vespasian Warner (R)
▌14. Joseph V. Graff (R)
▌15. Benjamin F. Marsh (R)
▌16. William H. Hinrichsen (D)
▌17. James A. Connolly (R)
▌18. Thomas M. Jett (D)
▌19. Andrew J. Hunter (D)
▌20. James R. Campbell (D)
▌21. Jehu Baker (D)
▌22. George Washington Smith (R)

==== Indiana ====
▌1. James A. Hemenway (R)
▌2. Robert W. Miers (D)
▌3. William T. Zenor (D)
▌4. William S. Holman (D), until April 22, 1897

▌Francis M. Griffith (D), from December 6, 1897

▌5. George W. Faris (R)
▌6. Henry U. Johnson (R)
▌7. Jesse Overstreet (R)
▌8. Charles L. Henry (R)
▌9. Charles B. Landis (R)
▌10. Edgar D. Crumpacker (R)
▌11. George W. Steele (R)
▌12. James M. Robinson (D)
▌13. Lemuel W. Royse (R)

==== Iowa ====
▌1. Samuel M. Clark (R)
▌2. George M. Curtis (R)
▌3. David B. Henderson (R)
▌4. Thomas Updegraff (R)
▌5. Robert G. Cousins (R)
▌6. John F. Lacey (R)
▌7. John A. T. Hull (R)
▌8. William P. Hepburn (R)
▌9. Alva L. Hager (R)
▌10. Jonathan P. Dolliver (R)
▌11. George D. Perkins (R)

==== Kansas ====
▌1. Case Broderick (R)
▌2. Mason S. Peters (P)
▌3. Edwin R. Ridgely (P)
▌4. Charles Curtis (R)
▌5. William D. Vincent (P)
▌6. Nelson B. McCormick (P)
▌7. Jeremiah Simpson (P)
▌At-large. Jeremiah D. Botkin (P)

==== Kentucky ====
▌1. Charles K. Wheeler (D)
▌2. John D. Clardy (D)
▌3. John S. Rhea (D)
▌4. David Highbaugh Smith (D)
▌5. Walter Evans (R)
▌6. Albert S. Berry (D)
▌7. Evan E. Settle (D)
▌8. George M. Davison (R)
▌9. Samuel J. Pugh (R)
▌10. Thomas Y. Fitzpatrick (D)
▌11. David G. Colson (R)

==== Louisiana ====
▌1. Adolph Meyer (D)
▌2. Robert C. Davey (D)
▌3. Robert F. Broussard (D)
▌4. Henry W. Ogden (D)
▌5. Samuel T. Baird (D)
▌6. Samuel M. Robertson (D)

==== Maine ====
▌1. Thomas B. Reed (R)
▌2. Nelson Dingley Jr. (R), until January 13, 1899
▌3. Seth L. Milliken (R), until April 18, 1897

▌Edwin C. Burleigh (R), from June 21, 1897

▌4. Charles A. Boutelle (R)

==== Maryland ====
▌1. Isaac A. Barber (R)
▌2. William B. Baker (R)
▌3. William S. Booze (R)
▌4. William W. McIntire (R)
▌5. Sydney E. Mudd (R)
▌6. John McDonald (R)

==== Massachusetts ====
▌1. Ashley B. Wright (R), until August 14, 1897

▌George P. Lawrence (R), from November 2, 1897

▌2. Frederick H. Gillett (R)
▌3. Joseph H. Walker (R)
▌4. George W. Weymouth (R)
▌5. William S. Knox (R)
▌6. William H. Moody (R)
▌7. William E. Barrett (R)
▌8. Samuel W. McCall (R)
▌9. John F. Fitzgerald (D)
▌10. Samuel J. Barrows (R)
▌11. Charles F. Sprague (R)
▌12. William C. Lovering (R)
▌13. John Simpkins (R), until March 27, 1898

▌William S. Greene (R), from May 31, 1898

==== Michigan ====
▌1. John B. Corliss (R)
▌2. George Spalding (R)
▌3. Albert M. Todd (D)
▌4. Edward L. Hamilton (R)
▌5. William Alden Smith (R)
▌6. Samuel W. Smith (R)
▌7. Horace G. Snover (R)
▌8. Ferdinand Brucker (D)
▌9. Roswell P. Bishop (R)
▌10. Rousseau O. Crump (R)
▌11. William S. Mesick (R)
▌12. Carlos D. Shelden (R)

==== Minnesota ====
▌1. James Albertus Tawney (R)
▌2. James T. McCleary (R)
▌3. Joel Heatwole (R)
▌4. Frederick C. Stevens (R)
▌5. Loren Fletcher (R)
▌6. R. Page W. Morris (R)
▌7. Frank Eddy (R)

==== Mississippi ====
▌1. John M. Allen (D)
▌2. William V. Sullivan (D), until May 31, 1898

▌Thomas Spight (D), from July 5, 1898

▌3. Thomas C. Catchings (D)
▌4. Andrew F. Fox (D)
▌5. John Sharp Williams (D)
▌6. William F. Love (D), until October 16, 1898

▌Frank A. McLain (D), from December 12, 1898

▌7. Patrick Henry (D)

==== Missouri ====
▌1. James T. Lloyd (D), from June 1, 1897
▌2. Robert N. Bodine (D)
▌3. Alexander M. Dockery (D)
▌4. Charles F. Cochran (D)
▌5. William S. Cowherd (D)
▌6. David A. De Armond (D)
▌7. James Cooney (D)
▌8. Richard P. Bland (D)
▌9. James Beauchamp Clark (D)
▌10. Richard Bartholdt (R)
▌11. Charles F. Joy (R)
▌12. Charles E. Pearce (R)
▌13. Edward Robb (D)
▌14. Willard D. Vandiver (D)
▌15. Maecenas E. Benton (D)

==== Montana ====
▌At-large. Charles S. Hartman (SR)

==== Nebraska ====
▌1. Jesse B. Strode (R)
▌2. David H. Mercer (R)
▌3. Samuel Maxwell (P)
▌4. William L. Stark (P)
▌5. Roderick D. Sutherland (P)
▌6. William L. Greene (P)

==== Nevada ====
▌At-large. Francis G. Newlands (S)

==== New Hampshire ====
▌1. Cyrus A. Sulloway (R)
▌2. Frank G. Clarke (R)

==== New Jersey ====
▌1. Henry C. Loudenslager (R)
▌2. John J. Gardner (R)
▌3. Benjamin F. Howell (R)
▌4. Mahlon Pitney (R), until January 10, 1899
▌5. James F. Stewart (R)
▌6. Richard Wayne Parker (R)
▌7. Thomas McEwan Jr. (R)
▌8. Charles N. Fowler (R)

==== New York ====
▌1. Joseph M. Belford (R)
▌2. Denis M. Hurley (R), until February 26, 1899
▌3. Francis H. Wilson (R), until September 30, 1897

▌Edmund H. Driggs (D), from December 6, 1897

▌4. Israel F. Fischer (R)
▌5. Charles G. Bennett (R)
▌6. James R. Howe (R)
▌7. John H. G. Vehslage (D)
▌8. John M. Mitchell (R)
▌9. Thomas J. Bradley (D)
▌10. Amos J. Cummings (D)
▌11. William Sulzer (D)
▌12. George B. McClellan Jr. (D)
▌13. Richard C. Shannon (R)
▌14. Lemuel E. Quigg (R)
▌15. Philip B. Low (R)
▌16. William L. Ward (R)
▌17. Benjamin Odell (R)
▌18. John H. Ketcham (R)
▌19. Aaron V. S. Cochrane (R)
▌20. George N. Southwick (R)
▌21. David F. Wilber (R)
▌22. Lucius N. Littauer (R)
▌23. Wallace T. Foote Jr. (R)
▌24. Charles A. Chickering (R)
▌25. James S. Sherman (R)
▌26. George W. Ray (R)
▌27. James J. Belden (R)
▌28. Sereno E. Payne (R)
▌29. Charles W. Gillet (R)
▌30. James W. Wadsworth (R)
▌31. Henry C. Brewster (R)
▌32. Rowland B. Mahany (R)
▌33. De Alva S. Alexander (R)
▌34. Warren B. Hooker (R), until November 10, 1898

==== North Carolina ====
▌1. Harry Skinner (P)
▌2. George H. White (R)
▌3. John E. Fowler (P)
▌4. William F. Strowd (P)
▌5. William W. Kitchin (D)
▌6. Charles H. Martin (P)
▌7. Alonzo C. Shuford (P)
▌8. Romulus Z. Linney (R)
▌9. Richmond Pearson (R)

==== North Dakota ====
▌At-large. Martin N. Johnson (R)

==== Ohio ====
▌1. William B. Shattuc (R)
▌2. Jacob H. Bromwell (R)
▌3. John L. Brenner (D)
▌4. George A. Marshall (D)
▌5. David Meekison (D)
▌6. Seth W. Brown (R)
▌7. Walter L. Weaver (R)
▌8. Archibald Lybrand (R)
▌9. James H. Southard (R)
▌10. Lucien J. Fenton (R)
▌11. Charles H. Grosvenor (R)
▌12. John J. Lentz (D)
▌13. James A. Norton (D)
▌14. Winfield S. Kerr (R)
▌15. Henry C. Van Voorhis (R)
▌16. Lorenzo Danford (R)
▌17. John A. McDowell (D)
▌18. Robert W. Tayler (R)
▌19. Stephen A. Northway (R), until September 8, 1898

▌Charles W. F. Dick (R), from November 8, 1898

▌20. Clifton B. Beach (R)
▌21. Theodore E. Burton (R)

==== Oregon ====
▌1. Thomas H. Tongue (R)
▌2. William R. Ellis (R)

==== Pennsylvania ====
▌1. Henry H. Bingham (R)
▌2. Robert Adams Jr. (R)
▌3. William McAleer (D)
▌4. James R. Young (R)
▌5. Alfred C. Harmer (R)
▌6. Thomas S. Butler (IR)
▌7. Irving P. Wanger (R)
▌8. William S. Kirkpatrick (R)
▌9. Daniel Ermentrout (D)
▌10. Marriott Brosius (R)
▌11. William Connell (R)
▌12. Morgan B. Williams (R)
▌13. Charles N. Brumm (R)
▌14. Marlin E. Olmsted (R)
▌15. James H. Codding (R)
▌16. Horace B. Packer (R)
▌17. Monroe H. Kulp (R)
▌18. Thaddeus M. Mahon (R)
▌19. George J. Benner (D)
▌20. Josiah D. Hicks (R)
▌21. Edward E. Robbins (R)
▌22. John Dalzell (R)
▌23. William A. Stone (R), until November 9, 1898

▌William H. Graham (R), from November 29, 1898

▌24. Ernest F. Acheson (R)
▌25. Joseph B. Showalter (R), from April 20, 1897
▌26. John C. Sturtevant (R)
▌27. Charles W. Stone (R)
▌28. William C. Arnold (R)
▌At-large. Samuel A. Davenport (R)
▌At-large. Galusha A. Grow (R)

==== Rhode Island ====
▌1. Melville Bull (R)
▌2. Adin B. Capron (R)

==== South Carolina ====
▌1. William Elliott (D)
▌2. William J. Talbert (D)
▌3. Asbury C. Latimer (D)
▌4. Stanyarne Wilson (D)
▌5. Thomas J. Strait (D)
▌6. John L. McLaurin (D), until May 31, 1897

▌James Norton (D), from December 6, 1897

▌7. J. William Stokes (D)

==== South Dakota ====
Both representatives were elected statewide on a general ticket.

▌At-large. John E. Kelley (P)
▌At-large. Freeman Knowles (P)

==== Tennessee ====
▌1. Walter P. Brownlow (R)
▌2. Henry R. Gibson (R)
▌3. John A. Moon (D)
▌4. Benton McMillin (D), until January 6, 1899
▌5. James D. Richardson (D)
▌6. John W. Gaines (D)
▌7. Nicholas N. Cox (D)
▌8. Thetus W. Sims (D)
▌9. Rice A. Pierce (D)
▌10. Edward W. Carmack (D)

==== Texas ====
▌1. Thomas H. Ball (D)
▌2. Samuel B. Cooper (D)
▌3. Reese C. De Graffenreid (D)
▌4. John W. Cranford (D), until March 3, 1899
▌5. Joseph W. Bailey (D)
▌6. Robert E. Burke (D)
▌7. Robert L. Henry (D)
▌8. Samuel W. T. Lanham (D)
▌9. Joseph D. Sayers (D), until January 16, 1899
▌10. Robert B. Hawley (R)
▌11. Rudolph Kleberg (D)
▌12. James L. Slayden (D)
▌13. John H. Stephens (D)

==== Utah ====
▌At-large. William H. King (D)

==== Vermont ====
▌1. H. Henry Powers (R)
▌2. William W. Grout (R)

==== Virginia ====
▌1. William A. Jones (D)
▌2. William A. Young (D), until April 26, 1898

▌Richard A. Wise (R), from April 26, 1898

▌3. John Lamb (D)
▌4. Sydney P. Epes (D), until March 23, 1898

▌Robert T. Thorp (R), from March 23, 1898

▌5. Claude A. Swanson (D)
▌6. Peter J. Otey (D)
▌7. James Hay (D)
▌8. John F. Rixey (D)
▌9. James A. Walker (R)
▌10. Jacob Yost (R)

==== Washington ====
Both representatives were elected statewide on a general ticket.

▌At-large. William C. Jones (SR)
▌At-large. James Hamilton Lewis (D)

==== West Virginia ====
▌1. Blackburn B. Dovener (R)
▌2. Alston G. Dayton (R)
▌3. Charles P. Dorr (R)
▌4. Warren Miller (R)

==== Wisconsin ====
▌1. Henry Allen Cooper (R)
▌2. Edward Sauerhering (R)
▌3. Joseph W. Babcock (R)
▌4. Theobald Otjen (R)
▌5. Samuel S. Barney (R)
▌6. James H. Davidson (R)
▌7. Michael Griffin (R)
▌8. Edward S. Minor (R)
▌9. Alexander Stewart (R)
▌10. John J. Jenkins (R)

==== Wyoming ====
▌At-large. John E. Osborne (D)

==== Non-voting members ====
▌Arizona Territory. Marcus A. Smith (D)
▌New Mexico Territory. Harvey B. Fergusson (D)
▌Oklahoma Territory. James Y. Callahan (S)

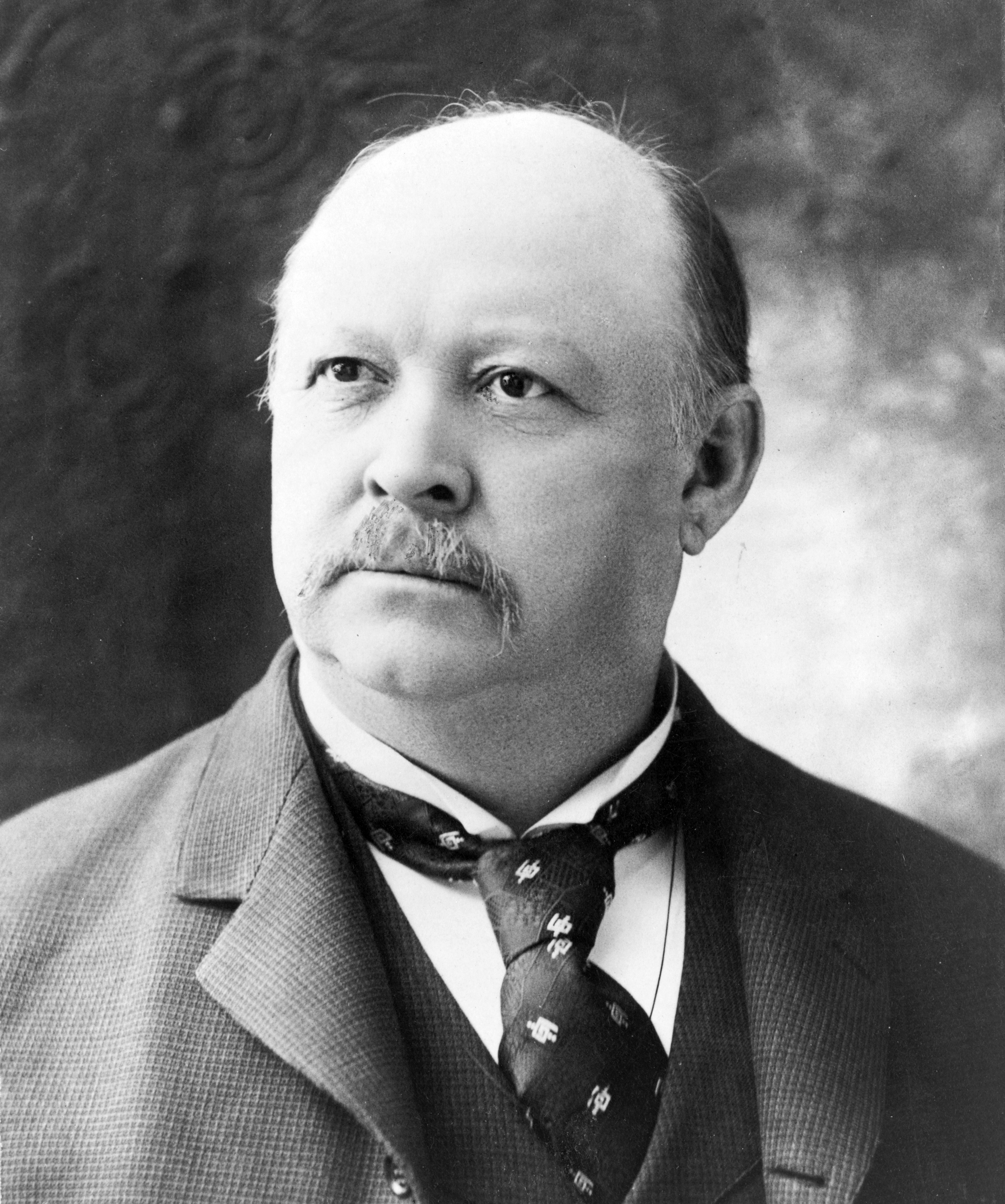
Speaker of the House Thomas Brackett Reed

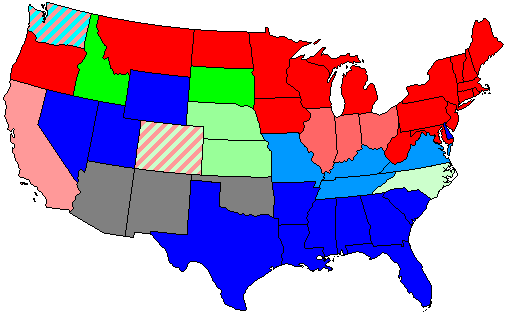
House seats by party holding plurality in state: 80+% to 100% Democratic / 80+% to 100% Republican; 60+% to 80% Democratic / 60+% to 80% Republican; Up to 60% Democratic / Up to 60% Republican

== Changes in membership ==
The count below reflects changes from the beginning of the first session of this Congress.

=== Senate ===
- Replacements: 5
  - Democratic: no net change
  - Republican: no net change
- Deaths: 5
- Resignations: 0
- Total seats with changes: 8

State (class)	Vacated by	Reason for vacancy	Subsequent	Date of successor's installation
Ohio (1)	John Sherman (R)	Resigned March 4, 1897, to become U.S. Secretary of State. Elected to fill remainder of term.	Mark Hanna (R)	March 5, 1897
Florida (3)	Vacant	Failure to elect. Successor elected May 14, 1897.	Stephen R. Mallory (D)	May 15, 1897
Oregon (3)	Vacant	Failure to elect. Successor elected October 8, 1898.	Joseph Simon (R)	October 8, 1898
South Carolina (3)	Joseph H. Earle (D)	Died May 20, 1897. Successor was appointed and subsequently elected.	John L. McLaurin (D)	June 1, 1897
Tennessee (2)	Isham G. Harris (D)	Died July 8, 1897. Successor was appointed and subsequently elected.	Thomas B. Turley (D)	July 20, 1897
Mississippi (1)	James Z. George (D)	Died August 14, 1897. Successor was appointed and subsequently elected.	Hernando Money (D)	October 8, 1897
Mississippi (2)	Edward C. Walthall (D)	Died April 21, 1898. Successor was appointed and subsequently elected.	William V. Sullivan (D)	May 31, 1898
Vermont (3)	Justin S. Morrill (R)	Died December 28, 1898. Successor was appointed.	Jonathan Ross (R)	January 11, 1899

=== House of Representatives ===
- Replacements: 14
  - Democratic: 1 seat net loss
  - Republican: 1 seat net gain
- Deaths: 10
- Resignations: 9
- Contested election: 3
- Total seats with changes: 23

District	Previous	Reason for change	Subsequent	Date of successor's installation
Pennsylvania 25th	Vacant	Rep.-elect James J. Davidson died before being seated. Showalter was elected to finish term.	Joseph B. Showalter (R)	April 20, 1897
Missouri 1st	Vacant	Rep.-elect Richard P. Giles died before being seated. Lloyd was elected to finish term.	James T. Lloyd (D)	June 1, 1897
Maine 3rd	Seth L. Milliken (R)	Died April 18, 1897	Edwin C. Burleigh (R)	June 21, 1897
Indiana 4th	William S. Holman (D)	Died April 22, 1897.	Francis M. Griffith (D)	December 6, 1897
South Carolina 6th	John L. McLaurin (D)	Resigned May 31, 1897, after being appointed to the U.S. Senate	James Norton (D)	December 6, 1897
Illinois 6th	Edward D. Cooke (R)	Died June 24, 1897	Henry S. Boutell (R)	November 23, 1897
Massachusetts 1st	Ashley B. Wright (R)	Died August 14, 1897	George P. Lawrence (R)	November 2, 1897
New York 3rd	Francis H. Wilson (R)	Resigned September 30, 1897, to become Postmaster of Brooklyn, New York	Edmund H. Driggs (D)	December 6, 1897
Alabama 4th	Thomas S. Plowman (D)	Lost contested election February 9, 1898	William F. Aldrich (R)	February 9, 1898
Virginia 4th	Sidney P. Epes (D)	Lost contested election March 23, 1898	Robert T. Thorp (R)	March 23, 1898
Massachusetts 13th	John Simpkins (R)	Died March 27, 1898	William S. Greene (R)	May 31, 1898
Virginia 2nd	William A. Young (D)	Lost contested election April 26, 1898	Richard A. Wise (R)	April 26, 1898
Mississippi 2nd	William V. Sullivan (D)	Resigned May 31, 1898, after being appointed to the U.S. Senate	Thomas Spight (D)	July 5, 1898
Ohio 19th	Stephen A. Northway (R)	Died September 8, 1898	Charles W. F. Dick (R)	November 8, 1898
Mississippi 6th	William F. Love (D)	Died October 16, 1898	Frank A. McLain (D)	December 12, 1898
Pennsylvania 23rd	William A. Stone (R)	Resigned November 9, 1898, to run for Governor of Pennsylvania	William H. Graham (R)	November 29, 1898
New York 34th	Warren B. Hooker (R)	Resigned November 10, 1898, after being appointed judge for the New York Supreme Court	Seat remained vacant until next Congress	
Tennessee 4th	Benton McMillin (D)	Resigned January 6, 1899, after being elected Governor of Tennessee	Seat remained vacant until next Congress	
New Jersey 4th	Mahlon Pitney (R)	Resigned January 10, 1899, after being elected to the New Jersey Senate	Seat remained vacant until next Congress	
Maine 2nd	Nelson Dingley Jr. (R)	Died January 13, 1899	Seat remained vacant until next Congress	
Texas 9th	Joseph D. Sayers (D)	Resigned January 16, 1899, after being elected Governor of Texas	Seat remained vacant until next Congress	
New York 2nd	Denis M. Love (R)	Died February 26, 1899	Seat remained vacant until next Congress	
Texas 4th	John W. Cranford (D)	Died March 3, 1899	Seat remained vacant until next Congress	

== Committees ==
Lists of committees and their party leaders for members of the House and Senate committees can be found through the Official Congressional Directory at the bottom of this article. The directory after the pages of terms of service lists committees of the Senate, House (Standing with Subcommittees, Select and Special) and Joint and, after that, House/Senate committee assignments. On the committees section of the House and Senate in the Official Congressional Directory, the committee's members on the first row on the left side shows the chairman of the committee and on the right side shows the ranking member of the committee.

=== Senate ===
- Additional Accommodations for the Library of Congress (Select) (Chairman: George Gray; Ranking Member: Shelby M. Cullom)
- Agriculture and Forestry (Chairman: Redfield Proctor; Ranking Member: James Z. George)
- Appropriations (Chairman: William B. Allison; Ranking Member: Francis M. Cockrell)
- Audit and Control the Contingent Expenses of the Senate (Chairman: John P. Jones; Ranking Member: James K. Jones)
- Canadian Relations (Chairman: John C. Spooner; Ranking Member: Edward Murphy Jr.)
- Census (Chairman: Thomas H. Carter; Ranking Member: David Turpie)
- Civil Service and Retrenchment (Chairman: Jeter C. Pritchard; Ranking Member: Edward C. Walthall)
- Claims (Chairman: Henry M. Teller; Ranking Member: Samuel Pasco)
- Coast Defenses (Chairman: George W. McBride; Ranking Member: Roger Q. Mills)
- Commerce (Chairman: William P. Frye; Ranking Member: George G. Vest)
- Corporations Organized in the District of Columbia (Chairman: John W. Daniel)
- Distributing Public Revenue Among the States (Select)
- District of Columbia (Chairman: James McMillan; Ranking Member: Isham G. Harris then Charles J. Faulkner)
- Education and Labor (Chairman: James H. Kyle; Ranking Member: James Z. George)
- Engrossed Bills (Chairman: Francis M. Cockrell; Ranking Member: Lucien Baker)
- Enrolled Bills (Chairman: William J. Sewell; Ranking Member: Donelson Caffery)
- Establish a University in the United States (Select) (Chairman: George L. Wellington)
- Examine the Several Branches in the Civil Service (Chairman: Joseph B. Foraker)
- Finance (Chairman: Justin S. Morrill; Ranking Member: Isham G. Harris)
- Fisheries (Chairman: George C. Perkins; Ranking Member: John L. Mitchell)
- Five Civilized Tribes of Indians (Select) (Chairman: Samuel Pasco; Ranking Member: Orville H. Platt)
- Foreign Relations (Chairman: Cushman K. Davis; Ranking Member: John T. Morgan)
- Forest Reservations and the Protection of Game (Chairman: William V. Allen; Ranking Member: John T. Morgan)
- Geological Survey (Select) (Chairman: Stephen B. Elkins; Ranking Member: Edward C. Walthall)
- Immigration (Chairman: Charles W. Fairbanks; Ranking Member: Charles J. Faulkner)
- Indian Affairs (Chairman: Richard F. Pettigrew; Ranking Member: James K. Jones)
- Indian Depredations (Chairman: John L. Wilson; Ranking Member: William Lindsay)
- International Expositions (Select) (Chairman: John M. Thurston; Ranking Member: George G. Vest)
- Interstate Commerce (Chairman: Shelby M. Cullom; Ranking Member: Arthur P. Gorman)
- Irrigation and Reclamation of Arid Lands (Chairman: Francis E. Warren; Ranking Member: Stephen M. White)
- Judiciary (Chairman: George F. Hoar; Ranking Member: James Z. George)
- Library (Chairman: George P. Wetmore; Ranking Member: Francis M. Cockrell)
- Manufactures (Chairman: William E. Mason; Ranking Member: James Smith Jr.)
- Military Affairs (Chairman: Joseph R. Hawley; Ranking Member: William B. Bate)
- Mines and Mining (Chairman: William M. Stewart; Ranking Member: Roger Q. Mills)
- Mississippi River and its Tributaries (Select)
- National Banks (Select) (Chairman: Lee Mantle; Ranking Member: John L. Mitchell)
- Naval Affairs (Chairman: Eugene Hale; Ranking Member: James Smith Jr.)
- Nicaragua Canal (Select) (Chairman: John Tyler Morgan; Ranking Member: Joseph R. Hawley)
- Omaha Exposition (Select)
- Pacific Railroads (Chairman: John H. Gear; Ranking Member: John T. Morgan)
- Patents (Chairman: Orville H. Platt; Ranking Member: Roger Q. Mills)
- Pensions (Chairman: Jacob H. Gallinger; Ranking Member: John L. Mitchell)
- Post Office and Post Roads (Chairman: Edward O. Wolcott; Ranking Member: Marion Butler)
- Potomac River Front (Select) (Chairman: David Turpie; Ranking Member: William P. Frye)
- Printing (Chairman: Henry Cabot Lodge; Ranking Member: Arthur P. Gorman)
- Private Land Claims (Chairman: James K. Jones; Ranking Member: Eugene Hale)
- Privileges and Elections (Chairman: William E. Chandler; Ranking Member: Charles J. Faulkner)
- Public Buildings and Grounds (Chairman: Matthew S. Quay; Ranking Member: George G. Vest)
- Public Health and National Quarantine (Chairman: George G. Vest; Ranking Member: Samuel D. McEnery)
- Public Lands (Chairman: Henry C. Hansbrough; Ranking Member: James H. Berry)
- Railroads (Chairman: Clarence D. Clark; Ranking Member: William J. Deboe)
- Revision of the Laws (Chairman: Julius C. Burrows; Ranking Member: John W. Daniel)
- Revolutionary Claims (Chairman: Edward C. Walthall; Ranking Member: William B. Bate)
- Rules (Chairman: Nelson W. Aldrich; Ranking Member: Isham G. Harris)
- Tariff Regulation (Select)
- Territories (Chairman: George L. Shoup; Ranking Member: Thomas C. Platt)
- Transportation and Sale of Meat Products (Select) (Chairman: William B. Bate; Ranking Member: Edward O. Wolcott)
- Transportation Routes to the Seaboard (Chairman: George L. Shoup; Ranking Member: James Z. George)
- Trespassers upon Indian Lands (Chairman: Lucien Baker; Ranking Member: William N. Roach)
- Washington City Centennial (Select)
- Whole
- Woman Suffrage (Select) (Chairman: James H. Berry; Ranking Member: Matthew S. Quay)

=== House of Representatives ===
- Accounts (Chairman: Benjamin B. Odell Jr.; Ranking Member: Charles L. Bartlett)
- Agriculture (Chairman: James W. Wadsworth; Ranking Member: John S. Williams)
- Alcoholic Liquor Traffic (Chairman: Henry C. Brewster; Ranking Member: John E. Osborne)
- Appropriations (Chairman: Joseph G. Cannon; Ranking Member: Joseph D. Sayers)
- Banking and Currency (Chairman: Joseph H. Walker; Ranking Member: Nicholas N. Cox)
- Claims (Chairman: Charles N. Brumm; Ranking Member: John E. Osborne)
- Coinage, Weights and Measures (Chairman: Charles W. Stone; Ranking Member: Richard P. Bland)
- Disposition of Executive Papers
- District of Columbia (Chairman: Joseph W. Babcock; Ranking Member: James D. Richardson)
- Education (Chairman: Galusha A. Grow; Ranking Member: John E. Fowler)
- Election of the President, Vice President and Representatives in Congress (Chairman: John B. Corliss; Ranking Member: Milford W. Howard)
- Elections No.#1 (Chairman: Robert W. Tayler; Ranking Member: Charles L. Bartlett)
- Elections No.#2 (Chairman: Henry U. Johnson; Ranking Member: James G. Maguire)
- Elections No.#3 (Chairman: James A. Walker; Ranking Member: Robert W. Miers)
- Enrolled Bills (Chairman: Alva L. Hager; Ranking Member: Asbury C. Latimer)
- Expenditures in the Agriculture Department (Chairman: Charles W. Gillet; Ranking Member: William F. Strowd)
- Expenditures in the Interior Department (Chairman: Charles Curtis; Ranking Member: Jehu Baker)
- Expenditures in the Justice Department (Chairman: Cyrus A. Sulloway; Ranking Member: Thomas C. Catchings)
- Expenditures in the Navy Department (Chairman: James F. Stewart; Ranking Member: Stanyarne Wilson)
- Expenditures in the Post Office Department (Chairman: Irving P. Wanger; Ranking Member: Milford W. Howard)
- Expenditures in the State Department (Chairman: Lemuel E. Quigg; Ranking Member: Rufus E. Lester)
- Expenditures in the Treasury Department (Chairman: Robert G. Cousins; Ranking Member: William L. Terry)
- Expenditures in the War Department (Chairman: William W. Grout; Ranking Member: Joseph Wheeler)
- Expenditures on Public Buildings (Chairman: David G. Colson; Ranking Member: Richard P. Bland)
- Foreign Affairs (Chairman: Robert R. Hitt; Ranking Member: Hugh A. Dinsmore)
- Immigration and Naturalization (Chairman: Lorenzo Danford; Ranking Member: John M. Allen)
- Indian Affairs (Chairman: James S. Sherman; Ranking Member: John S. Little)
- Interstate and Foreign Commerce (Chairman: William P. Hepburn; Ranking Member: William McAleer)
- Invalid Pensions (Chairman: George W. Ray; Ranking Member: George B. McClellan Jr.)
- Irrigation of Arid Lands (Chairman: William R. Ellis; Ranking Member: John F. Shafroth)
- Judiciary (Chairman: David B. Henderson; Ranking Member: William L. Terry)
- Labor (Chairman: John J. Gardner; Ranking Member: W. Jasper Talbert)
- Levees and Improvements of the Mississippi River (Chairman: Richard Bartholdt; Ranking Member: John M. Allen)
- Manufactures (Chairman: George W. Faris; Ranking Member: Willard D. Vandiver)
- Merchant Marine and Fisheries (Chairman: Sereno E. Payne; Ranking Member: John F. Fitzgerald)
- Mileage (Chairman: John A. Barham; Ranking Member: Samuel B. Cooper)
- Military Affairs (Chairman: John A.T. Hull; Ranking Member: William Sulzer)
- Militia (Chairman: Benjamin F. Marsh; Ranking Member: Rudolph Kleberg)
- Mines and Mining (Chairman: Charles H. Grosvenor; Ranking Member: Charles S. Hartman)
- Naval Affairs (Chairman: Charles A. Boutelle; Ranking Member: Amos J. Cummings)
- Pacific Railroads (Chairman: H. Henry Powers; Ranking Member: James G. Maguire)
- Patents (Chairman: Josiah D. Hicks; Ranking Member: William Sulzer)
- Pensions (Chairman: Henry C. Loudenslager; Ranking Member: Jesse F. Stallings)
- Post Office and Post Roads (Chairman: Eugene F. Loud; Ranking Member: Claude A. Swanson)
- Public Buildings and Grounds (Chairman: David H. Mercer; Ranking Member: John H. Bankhead)
- Public Lands (Chairman: John F. Lacey; Ranking Member: John F. Shafroth)
- Railways and Canals (Chairman: Charles A. Chickering; Ranking Member: Peter J. Otey)
- Reform in the Civil Service (Chairman: Marriott Brosius; Ranking Member: Alexander M. Dockery)
- Revision of Laws (Chairman: Vespasian Warner; Ranking Member: John W. Maddox)
- Rivers and Harbors (Chairman: Warren B. Hooker; Ranking Member: Thomas C. Catchings)
- Rules (Chairman: Thomas B. Reed; Ranking Member: Joseph W. Bailey)
- Standards of Official Conduct
- Territories (Chairman: William S. Knox; Ranking Member: William McAleer)
- Ventilation and Acoustics (Chairman: Joel P. Heatwole; Ranking Member: Harry Skinner)
- War Claims (Chairman: Thaddeus M. Mahon; Ranking Member: George M. Davison)
- Ways and Means (Chairman: Nelson Dingley; Ranking Member: Joseph W. Bailey)
- Whole

=== Joint committees ===
- Alcohol in the Arts (Select)
- Conditions of Indian Tribes (Special)
- Disposition of (Useless) Executive Papers
- Enrolled Bills (Chairman: Rep. Alva L. Hager; Vice Chairman: Sen. Asbury C. Latimer)
- Investigate Charities and Reformatory Institutions in the District of Columbia
- The Library (Chairman: Rep. Alfred C. Harmer; Vice Chairman: Rep. Amos J. Cummings)
- Printing (Chairman: Rep. George D. Perkins; Vice Chairman: Rep. James D. Richardson)

== Caucuses ==
- Democratic (House)
- Democratic (Senate)

== Employees ==
=== Legislative branch agency directors ===
- Architect of the Capitol: Edward Clark
- Librarian of Congress: Ainsworth Rand Spofford, until 1897
  - John Russell Young, from 1897
- Public Printer of the United States: Thomas E. Benedict, until 1897
  - Francis W. Palmer, from 1897

=== Senate ===
- Secretary: William Ruffin Cox
- Sergeant at Arms: Richard J. Bright
- Librarian: Alonzo M. Church
- Chaplain: William H. Millburn Methodist

=== House of Representatives ===
- Clerk: Alexander McDowell
- Sergeant at Arms: Benjamin F. Russell
- Doorkeeper: William J. Glenn
- Postmaster: Joseph C. McElroy
- Clerk at the Speaker's Table: Asher C. Hinds
- Reading Clerks: E. L. Lampson (D) and Dennis E. Alward (R)
- Chaplain: Henry N. Couden Universalist

== See also ==
- 1896 United States elections (elections leading to this Congress)
  - 1896 United States presidential election
  - 1896–97 United States Senate elections
  - 1896 United States House of Representatives elections
- 1898 United States elections (elections during this Congress, leading to the next Congress)
  - 1898–99 United States Senate elections
  - 1898 United States House of Representatives elections
