= 1890 United States House of Representatives elections in South Carolina =

The 1890 United States House of Representatives elections in South Carolina were held on November 4, 1890, to select seven Representatives for two-year terms from the state of South Carolina. Two Democratic incumbents were re-elected, one Republican incumbent was defeated, and the four open seats were retained by the Democrats. The composition of the state delegation after the election was solely Democratic.

== 1st congressional district ==
Incumbent Democratic Congressman Samuel Dibble of the 1st congressional district, in office since 1883, declined to seek re-election. William H. Brawley was nominated by the Democrats and he defeated Republican challenger William D. Crum in the general election.

=== General election results ===
South Carolina's 1st congressional district election results, 1890
Party	Candidate	Votes	%	±%
Democratic	William H. Brawley	7,249	84.2	−2.5
Republican	William D. Crum	1,349	15.7	+2.6
No party	Write-Ins	14	0.1	−0.1
Majority		5,900	68.5	−5.1
Turnout		8,612		
Democratic hold				

== 2nd congressional district ==
Incumbent Democratic Congressman George D. Tillman of the 2nd congressional district, in office since 1883, defeated Republican challenger Seymour E. Smith.

=== General election results ===
South Carolina's 2nd congressional district election results, 1890
Party	Candidate	Votes	%	±%
Democratic	George D. Tillman (incumbent)	9,956	85.5	−1.3
Republican	Seymour E. Smith	1,671	14.3	+2.9
No party	Write-Ins	18	0.2	−1.6
Majority		8,285	71.2	−4.2
Turnout		11,645		
Democratic hold				

== 3rd congressional district ==
Incumbent Democratic Congressman James S. Cothran of the 3rd congressional district, in office since 1887, declined to seek re-election. George Johnstone won the Democratic primary and defeated Republican John R. Tolbert in the general election.

=== Democratic primary ===
Democratic primary
Candidate	Votes	%
D.K. Norris	4,794	48.9
George Johnstone	2,380	24.3
W.C. Benet	1,865	19.1
R.E. Bowen	550	5.6
Orville Calhoun	208	2.1

Democratic primary runoff
Candidate	Votes	%	±%
George Johnstone	5,553	50.1	+25.8
D.K. Norris	5,529	49.9	+1.0

=== General election results ===
South Carolina's 3rd congressional district election results, 1890
Party	Candidate	Votes	%	±%
Democratic	George Johnstone	8,942	91.4	−8.4
Republican	John R. Tolbert	803	8.2	+8.2
No party	Write-Ins	34	0.4	+0.2
Majority		8,139	83.2	−16.4
Turnout		9,779		
Democratic hold				

== 4th congressional district ==
Incumbent Democratic Congressman William H. Perry of the 4th congressional district, in office since 1885, declined to seek re-election. George W. Shell won the Democratic primary and defeated Republican J.F. Ensor in the general election.

=== Democratic primary ===
Democratic primary
Candidate	Votes	%
George W. Shell	5,140	41.9
David Duncan	4,927	40.2
Robert M. Smith	815	6.7
W.L. Mauldin	808	6.6
Isaac G. McKissick	569	4.6

=== General election results ===
South Carolina's 4th congressional district election results, 1890
Party	Candidate	Votes	%	±%
Democratic	George W. Shell	10,372	81.9	−18.0
Republican	J.F. Ensor	2,258	17.8	+17.8
No party	Write-Ins	32	0.3	+0.2
Majority		8,114	64.1	−35.7
Turnout		12,662		
Democratic hold				

== 5th congressional district ==
Incumbent Democratic Congressman John J. Hemphill of the 5th congressional district, in office since 1883, defeated Republican challenger G.G. Alexander.

=== General election results ===
South Carolina's 5th congressional district election results, 1890
Party	Candidate	Votes	%	±%
Democratic	John J. Hemphill (incumbent)	9,432	87.1	−12.6
Republican	G.G. Alexander	1,321	12.2	+12.2
No party	Write-Ins	75	0.7	+0.4
Majority		8,111	74.9	−24.5
Turnout		10,828		
Democratic hold				

== 6th congressional district ==
Incumbent Democratic Congressman George W. Dargan of the 6th congressional district, in office since 1883, declined to seek re-election. Eli T. Stackhouse was nominated by the Democrats and defeated Republican challenger Edmund H. Deas.

=== General election results ===
South Carolina's 6th congressional district election results, 1890
Party	Candidate	Votes	%	±%
Democratic	Eli T. Stackhouse	9,022	78.8	−16.9
Republican	Edmund H. Deas	2,352	20.5	+20.5
No party	Write-Ins	79	0.7	−3.6
Majority		6,670	58.3	−33.1
Turnout		11,453		
Democratic hold				

== 7th congressional district ==
Incumbent Republican Congressman Thomas E. Miller of the 7th congressional district, in office since 1890, was defeated by Democratic challenger William Elliott.

=== General election results ===
South Carolina's 7th congressional district election results, 1890
Party	Candidate	Votes	%	±%
Democratic	William Elliott	3,792	44.4	−9.7
Republican	Thomas E. Miller (incumbent)	3,315	38.8	−6.6
Independent Republican	E.M. Brayton	1,410	16.5	+16.5
No party	Write-Ins	26	0.3	−0.2
Majority		477	5.6	−3.1
Turnout		8,543		
Democratic gain from Republican				

== See also ==
- United States House of Representatives elections, 1890
- South Carolina gubernatorial election, 1890
- South Carolina's congressional districts
