= 1898 United States Senate special election in South Carolina =

1897 Democratic Senate primary in South Carolina
- August 31, 1897
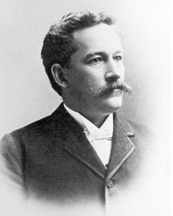

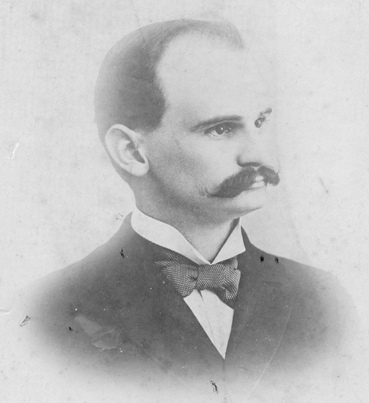
Nominee	John L. McLaurin	John Gary Evans
Party	Democratic	Democratic
Popular vote	29,326	11,375
Percentage	63.9%	24.8%
U.S. senator before election
Joseph H. Earle
Democratic
Elected U.S. Senator
John L. McLaurin
Democratic

The 1898 South Carolina United States Senate special election was January 26, 1898 election to pick the U.S. Senator from the state of South Carolina. The Democratic Party primary election was held on August 31, 1897. Prior to the ratification of the 17th Amendment to the United States Constitution, U.S. Senators were elected by the state legislature and not through the direct election by the people of the state. However, the Democratic Party of South Carolina organized primary elections for the U.S. Senate beginning in 1896 and the General Assembly would confirm the choice of the Democratic voters. Tillmanite Democrat John L. McLaurin won the Democratic primary and was elected by the General Assembly to serve the remainder of the six-year term expiring in 1903.

== Democratic primary ==
After Joseph H. Earle's victory in the 1896 Democratic primary election for Senate, the Conservatives believed that they had scored a decisive victory over the Tillmanite faction. Earle's sudden death in 1897 caught the Conservatives by surprise and they were unprepared to enter a candidate in the Democratic primary election on August 31 to replace Earle in the U.S. Senate. Thus all the candidates who entered the race were Tillmanites and were proponents of Free Silver.

Of the four serious candidates in the race, John L. McLaurin was the most acceptable to the Conservatives and was the only one strongly in favor of the tariffs promoted by the Republicans. When the campaigning began on July 5 in Chester, McLaurin was repeatedly attacked by former Senator John L. M. Irby and former Governor John Gary Evans over his support of the tariff. McLaurin was accused of organizing the Populist Party in South Carolina, a charge he vehemently denied. S.G. Mayfield withdrew from the race on August 12 at Yorkville when McLaurin provided evidence that he had worked to prevent the Populist Party from organizing in South Carolina. John T. Duncan and G. Walton Whitman were the two minor candidates in the contest, although Duncan withdrew from the race in the closing days of the campaign and Whitman was never officially recognized by the state Democratic Party.

Democratic Primary
Candidate	Votes	%
John L. McLaurin	29,326	63.9
John Gary Evans	11,375	24.8
John L. M. Irby	5,159	11.3

== See also ==
- List of United States senators from South Carolina
- List of special elections to the United States Senate
