= 1896–97 United States Senate elections =

- Dates vary by state
- Class 3

30 of the 90 seats in the United States Senate (as well as special elections) 46 seats needed for a majority
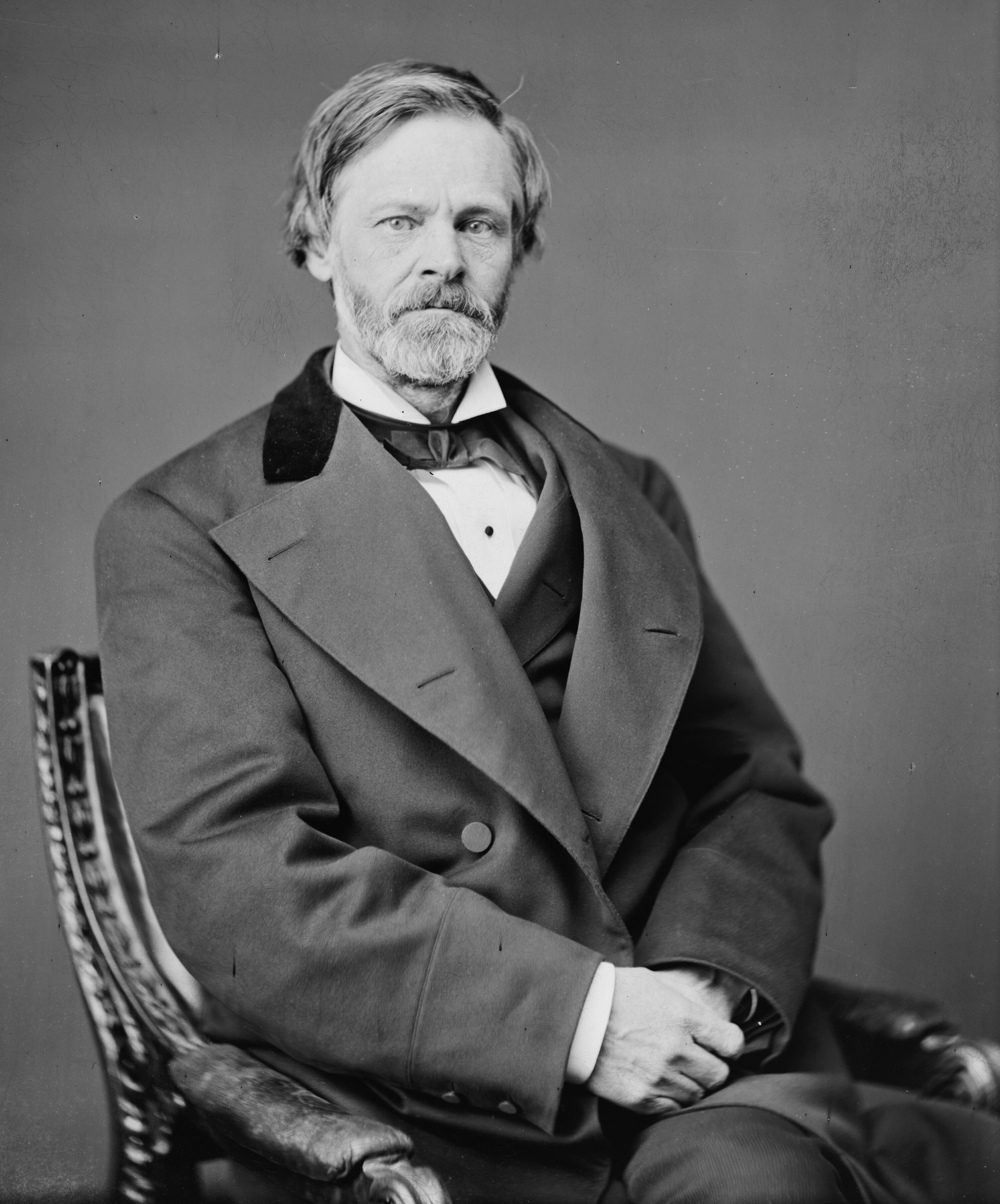

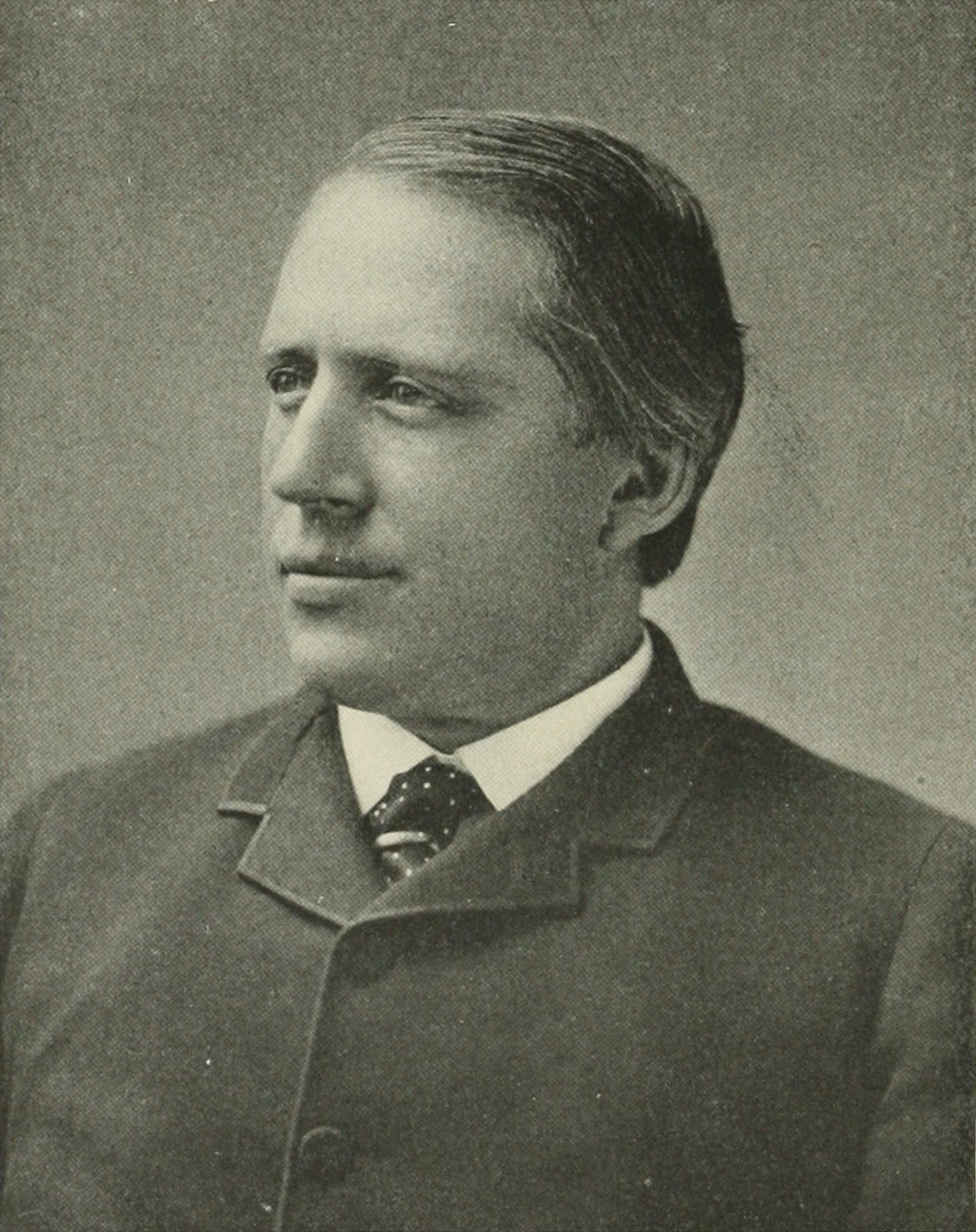
	Majority party	Minority party
Leader	John Sherman (Note: as Republican Conference Chair) (retired)	Arthur Pue Gorman (Note: as Democratic Caucus Chair) (Lost re-election)
Party	Republican	Democratic
Leader since	March 4, 1891	March 4, 1889
Leader's seat	Ohio	Maryland
Seats before	44	39
Seats won	15	7
Seats after	46	32
Seat change	▲2	▼7
Seats up	13	14
	Third party	Fourth party
Party	Populist	Silver Republican
Seats before	4	0
Seats won	3	2
Seats after	5	2
Seat change	▲1	▲2
Seats up	2	0
	Fifth party
Party	Silver
Seats before	2
Seats won	1
Seats after	2
Seat change	Steady
Seats up	1
- Results of the elections: Democratic gain Democratic hold Republican gain Republican hold Silver hold Populist gain Populist hold Silver Republican gain Silver Republican hold Legislature failed to elect
Majority Party before election
Republican
Elected Majority Party
Republican

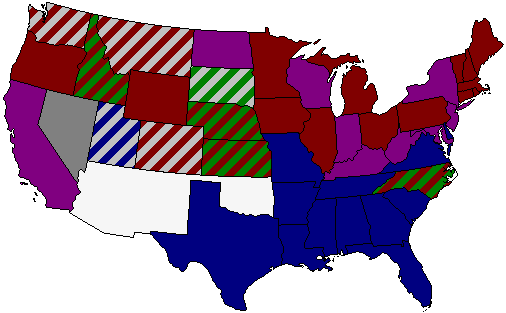
Senate composition by State, 55th Congress

The 1896–97 United States Senate elections were held on various dates in various states. As these U.S. Senate elections were prior to the ratification of the Seventeenth Amendment in 1913, senators were chosen by state legislatures. Senators were elected over a wide range of time throughout 1896 and 1897, and a seat may have been filled months late or remained vacant due to legislative deadlock. In these elections, terms were up for the senators in Class 3.

The Democratic Party lost seven seats, mostly to smaller third parties.

== Results summary ==
Senate party division, 55th Congress (1897–1899)

- Majority party: Republican (43)
- Minority party: Democratic (33)
- Other parties: Populist (5); Silver (5); Silver Republican (2)
- Total seats: 90
- Vacant: 2, later filled by 1 Republican and 1 Democrat.

== Change in Senate composition ==
=== Before the elections ===
					D_{1}	D_{2}	D_{3}	D_{4}	D_{5}
D_{15}	D_{14}	D_{13}	D_{12}	D_{11}	D_{10}	D_{9}	D_{8}	D_{7}	D_{6}
D_{16}	D_{17}	D_{18}	D_{19}	D_{20}	D_{21}	D_{22}	D_{23}	D_{24}	D_{25}
D_{35} Retired	D_{34} Retired	D_{33} Unknown	D_{32} Ran	D_{31} Ran	D_{30} Ran	D_{29} Ran	D_{28} Ran	D_{27} Ran	D_{26} Ran
D_{36} Retired	D_{37} Retired	D_{38} Retired	D_{39} Retired	V_{1}	P_{4} Ran	P_{3} Ran	P_{2}	P_{1}	S_{2} Ran
Plurality ↓									S_{1}
R_{36} Ran	R_{37} Ran	R_{38} Ran	R_{39} Ran	R_{40} Ran	R_{41} Ran	R_{42} Ran	R_{43} Retired	R_{44} Retired	S_{1}
R_{35} Ran	R_{34} Ran	R_{33} Ran	R_{32} Ran	R_{31}	R_{30}	R_{29}	R_{28}	R_{27}	R_{26}
R_{16}	R_{17}	R_{18}	R_{19}	R_{20}	R_{21}	R_{22}	R_{23}	R_{24}	R_{25}
R_{15}	R_{14}	R_{13}	R_{12}	R_{11}	R_{10}	R_{9}	R_{8}	R_{7}	R_{6}
					R_{1}	R_{2}	R_{3}	R_{4}	R_{5}

=== Result of the general elections ===
					D_{1}	D_{2}	D_{3}	D_{4}	D_{5}
D_{15}	D_{14}	D_{13}	D_{12}	D_{11}	D_{10}	D_{9}	D_{8}	D_{7}	D_{6}
D_{16}	D_{17}	D_{18}	D_{19}	D_{20}	D_{21}	D_{22}	D_{23}	D_{24}	D_{25}
P_{3} Re-elected	P_{4} Hold	P_{5} Gain from R	D_{32} Gain from R	D_{31} Hold	D_{30} Hold	D_{29} Hold	D_{28} Hold	D_{27} Re-elected	D_{26} Re-elected
P_{2}	P_{1}	S_{2} Re-elected	S_{1}	SR_{2} Re-elected was R	SR_{1} Gain from R	R_{46} Gain from D	R_{45} Gain from D	R_{44} Gain from D	V_{1} D Loss
Majority →								R_{44} Gain from D	V_{2}
R_{36} Re-elected	R_{37} Re-elected	R_{38} Re-elected	R_{39} Hold	R_{40} Gain from D	R_{41} Gain from D	R_{42} Gain from D	R_{43} Gain from D	R_{44} Gain from D	V_{3} R Loss
R_{35} Re-elected	R_{34} Re-elected	R_{33} Re-elected	R_{32} Re-elected	R_{31}	R_{30}	R_{29}	R_{28}	R_{27}	R_{26}
R_{16}	R_{17}	R_{18}	R_{19}	R_{20}	R_{21}	R_{22}	R_{23}	R_{24}	R_{25}
R_{15}	R_{14}	R_{13}	R_{12}	R_{11}	R_{10}	R_{9}	R_{8}	R_{7}	R_{6}
					R_{1}	R_{2}	R_{3}	R_{4}	R_{5}

=== Beginning of the next Congress ===
					D_{1}	D_{2}	D_{3}	D_{4}	D_{5}
D_{15}	D_{14}	D_{13}	D_{12}	D_{11}	D_{10}	D_{9}	D_{8}	D_{7}	D_{6}
D_{16}	D_{17}	D_{18}	D_{19}	D_{20}	D_{21}	D_{22}	D_{23}	D_{24}	D_{25}
P_{4}	P_{5}	D_{33} Gain	D_{32}	D_{31}	D_{30}	D_{29}	D_{28}	D_{27}	D_{26}
P_{3}	P_{2}	P_{1}	S_{2}	S_{1}	SR_{1}	SR_{2}	SR_{3} Changed	SR_{4} Changed	V_{1}
Plurality ↓								SR_{4} Changed	V_{1}
Plurality ↓								SR_{5} Changed	V_{2}
R_{36}	R_{37}	R_{38}	R_{39}	R_{40}	R_{41}	R_{42}	R_{43}	SR_{5} Changed	V_{2}
R_{35}	R_{34}	R_{33}	R_{32}	R_{31}	R_{30}	R_{29}	R_{28}	R_{27}	R_{26}
R_{16}	R_{17}	R_{18}	R_{19}	R_{20}	R_{21}	R_{22}	R_{23}	R_{24}	R_{25}
R_{15}	R_{14}	R_{13}	R_{12}	R_{11}	R_{10}	R_{9}	R_{8}	R_{7}	R_{6}
					R_{1}	R_{2}	R_{3}	R_{4}	R_{5}

Key:

D_{#}	Democratic
P_{#}	Populist
R_{#}	Republican
S_{#}	Silver
SR_{#}	Silver Republican
V_{#}	Vacant

== Race summaries ==
=== Elections during the 54th Congress ===
In these elections, the winners were seated during 1896 or in 1897 before March 4; ordered by election date.

State	Incumbent	Results	Candidates
Utah (Class 1)	None (new state)	Utah became a state January 4, 1896. First senators elected January 22, 1896. Republican gain.	▌ ✓ Frank J. Cannon (Republican); [data missing]
Utah (Class 3)	None (new state)	Utah became a state January 4, 1896. First senators elected January 22, 1896. Republican gain. Winner did not run for the next term; see below.	▌ ✓ Arthur Brown (Republican); [data missing]
Delaware (Class 2)	Vacant	Legislature had failed to elect. New senator elected January 19, 1897. Democratic gain.	▌ ✓ Richard R. Kenney (Democratic); [data missing]

=== Elections leading to the 55th Congress ===
In these regular elections, the winners were elected for the term beginning March 4, 1897; ordered by state.

All of the elections involved the Class 3 seats.

State	Incumbent			Results	Candidates
State	Senator	Party	Electoral history	Results	Candidates
Alabama	James L. Pugh	Democratic	1880 (special); 1884; 1890	Incumbent lost renomination. New senator elected in 1897. Democratic hold.	▌ ✓ Edmund Pettus (Democratic); [data missing]
Arkansas	James K. Jones	Democratic	1885; 1891	Incumbent re-elected January 20, 1897.	▌ ✓ James K. Jones (Democratic) 114; ▌James Sovereign (Populist) 9; ▌Powell Clayton (Republican) 10
California	George Perkins	Republican	1895 (special)	Incumbent re-elected January 13, 1897.	▌ ✓ George Perkins (Republican); [data missing]
Colorado	Henry M. Teller	Republican	1885; 1891	Incumbent re-elected as a Silver Republican January 20, 1897. Silver Republican gain.	▌ ✓ Henry M. Teller (Silver Republican) 92; ▌George W. Allen (Populist) 6
Connecticut	Orville H. Platt	Republican	1879; 1885; 1891	Incumbent re-elected January 20, 1897.	▌ ✓ Orville H. Platt (Republican); Unopposed
Florida	Wilkinson Call	Democratic	1879; 1885; 1891	Incumbent retired. Legislature failed to elect. Democratic loss. A new senator was later elected; see below.	None.
Georgia	John B. Gordon	Democratic	1873; 1879; 1880 (resigned); 1890	Incumbent retired. New senator elected in 1896. Democratic hold.	▌ ✓ Alexander S. Clay (Democratic); [data missing]
Idaho	Fred Dubois	Republican	1890	Incumbent lost re-election as a Silver Republican. New senator elected January 28, 1897. Populist gain.	▌ ✓ Henry Heitfeld (Populist) 39; ▌Fred Dubois (Silver Republican) 30; ▌Thomas F. Nelson (Populist) 1
Illinois	John M. Palmer	Democratic	1890	Incumbent retired. New senator elected January 20, 1897. Republican gain.	▌ ✓ William E. Mason (Republican) 125; ▌ John P. Altgeld (Democratic) 77
Indiana	Daniel W. Voorhees	Democratic	1877 (appointed); 1879 (special); 1885	Incumbent lost re-election. New senator elected January 20, 1897. Republican gain.	▌ ✓ Charles W. Fairbanks (Republican) 85; ▌Daniel W. Voorhees (Democratic) 58; ▌Leroy Templeton (Populist) 6
Iowa	William B. Allison	Republican	1872; 1878; 1884; 1890	Incumbent re-elected January 22, 1896.	▌ ✓ William B. Allison (Republican) 79; ▌Washington Irving Babb (Democratic) 25; ▌Frank Q. Stuart (Unknown) 1
Kansas	William A. Peffer	Populist	1891	Incumbent lost re-election. New senator elected January 27, 1897. Populist hold.	▌ ✓ William A. Harris (Populist); ▌William A. Peffer (Populist); [data missing]
Kentucky	J. C. S. Blackburn	Democratic	1884; 1890	Legislature failed to elect. Democratic loss. A new senator was later elected; see below.	None.
Louisiana	Newton C. Blanchard	Democratic	1894 (appointed); 1894 (special)	Incumbent retired. New senator elected May 28, 1896. Democratic hold.	▌ ✓ Samuel D. McEnery (Democratic); ▌Denegree (Citizen's League); 3-vote majority
Maryland	Charles H. Gibson	Democratic	1891 (appointed); 1892 (special)	Incumbent retired or lost re-election. New senator elected January 22, 1896. Republican gain.	▌ ✓ George L. Wellington (Republican) 63; ▌Phillips Lee Goldsborough (Republican) 1; ▌John Water Smith (Democratic) 24; ▌John R. Pattison (Democratic) 7; ▌James E. Elegood (Unknown) 1
Missouri	George G. Vest	Democratic	1879; 1885; 1891	Incumbent re-elected January 20, 1897.	▌ ✓ George G. Vest (Democratic); [data missing]
Nevada	John P. Jones	Silver	1873; 1879; 1885; 1891	Incumbent re-elected January 26, 1897.	▌ ✓ John P. Jones (Silver) 40; ▌William McMillan (Republican) 4; ▌A. L. Fitzgerald (Populist) 1
New Hampshire	Jacob H. Gallinger	Republican	1891	Incumbent re-elected January 20, 1897.	▌ ✓ Jacob H. Gallinger (Republican); Unopposed
New York	David B. Hill	Democratic	1891	Incumbent lost re-election. New senator elected January 20, 1897. Republican gain.	▌ ✓ Thomas C. Platt (Republican) 147; ▌David B. Hill (Democratic) 42; ▌Henry George (Ind. Democratic) 4
North Carolina	Jeter Pritchard	Republican	1894 (special)	Incumbent re-elected January 20, 1897.	▌ ✓ Jeter Pritchard (Republican) 88; ▌[FNU] Thompson (Populist) 43; ▌[FNU] Doughton (Democratic) 33
North Dakota	Henry C. Hansbrough	Republican	1891	Incumbent re-elected January 20, 1897.	▌ ✓ Henry C. Hansbrough (Republican); [data missing]
Ohio	Calvin S. Brice	Democratic	1890	Incumbent lost re-election. New senator elected January 14, 1896. Republican gain.	▌ ✓ Joseph B. Foraker (Republican); [data missing]
Oregon	John H. Mitchell	Republican	1885 (late); 1890	Legislature failed to elect. Republican loss. A new senator was later elected; see below.	▌John H. Mitchell (Republican)
Pennsylvania	J. Donald Cameron	Republican	1877 (special); 1879; 1885; 1891	Incumbent retired. New senator elected January 19, 1897. Republican hold.	▌ ✓ Boies Penrose (Republican) 83.00%; ▌Chauncey F. Black (Democratic) 15.42%; ▌John Wanamaker (Republican) 0.40%
South Carolina	John L. M. Irby	Democratic	1884	Incumbent retired. New senator elected January 26, 1897. Democratic hold.	▌ ✓ Joseph Earle (Democratic); Unopposed
South Dakota	James H. Kyle	Populist	1891	Incumbent re-elected February 18, 1897.	▌ ✓ James H. Kyle (Populist); [data missing]
Utah	Arthur Brown	Republican	1896 (new state)	Incumbent retired. New senator elected February 3, 1897. Democratic gain.	▌ ✓ Joseph L. Rawlins (Democratic) 32; ▌Moses Thatcher (Democratic) 29; ▌[FNU] Henderson (Unknown) 1; ▌[FNU] Brown (Unknown) 1
Vermont	Justin S. Morrill	Republican	1866; 1872; 1878; 1884; 1890	Incumbent re-elected in 1896.	▌ ✓ Justin S. Morrill (Republican); [data missing]
Washington	Watson C. Squire	Republican	1889; 1891	Incumbent lost re-election. New senator elected January 29, 1897. Silver Republican gain.	▌ ✓ George Turner (Silver Republican) 67; [data missing]
Wisconsin	William F. Vilas	Democratic	1890	Incumbent lost renomination. New senator elected January 27, 1897. Republican gain.	▌ ✓ John C. Spooner (Republican) 92.13%; ▌Willis C. Silverthorn (Democratic) 6.30%; ▌Edward S. Bragg (Gold Democratic) 1.57%

=== Elections during the 55th Congress ===
In these elections, the winners were elected in 1897 after March 4; ordered by date.

State	Incumbent			Results	Candidates
State	Senator	Party	Electoral history	Results	Candidates
Ohio (Class 1)	John Sherman	Republican	1861 (special); 1866; 1872; 1877 (resigned); 1881; 1886; 1892	Incumbent resigned March 4, 1897. New senator elected March 5, 1897. Republican hold.	▌ ✓ Mark Hanna (Republican); [data missing]
Florida (Class 3)	Vacant			Legislature had failed to elect; see above. New senator elected May 14, 1897. Democratic gain.	▌ ✓ Stephen Mallory II (Democratic) 53; ▌[FNU] Chipley (Unknown) 44; ▌[FNU] Call (Unknown) 1
Kentucky	Vacant			Legislature had failed to elect; see above. New senator elected April 28, 1897. Republican gain.	▌ ✓ William J. Deboe (Republican) 71; ▌J. C. S. Blackburn (Democratic) 50; ▌Henry L. Martin (Democratic) 13; ▌William J. Stone (Democratic) 1
Oregon (Class 3)	Vacant			Legislature had failed to elect; see above. New senator elected May 15, 1897. Republican gain.	▌ ✓ Joseph Simon (Republican); [data missing]

== Maryland ==
1896 United States Senate election in Maryland
- January 1897

80 members of the Maryland General Assembly
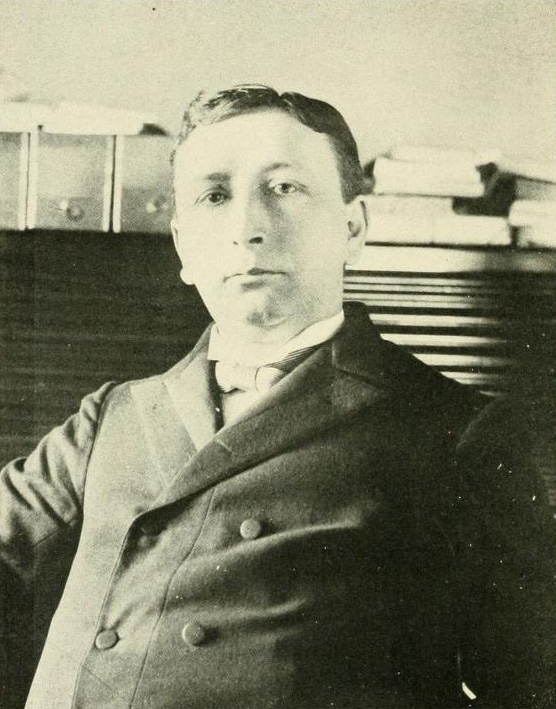
Candidate	George L. Wellington
Party	Republican
Legislative vote	-
Percentage	-%

George L. Wellington was elected by an unknown margin, for the Class 3 seat.

== New York ==
The election in New York was held on January 19, 1897, by the New York State Legislature. Democrat David B. Hill had been elected to this seat in 1891, and his term would expire on March 3, 1897. At the State election in November 1895, 36 Republicans and 14 Democrats were elected for a three-year term (1896–1898) in the state senate. At the State election in November 1896, 114 Republicans and 36 Democrats were elected for the session of 1897 to the Assembly. The 120th New York State Legislature met from January 6 to April 24, 1897, at Albany, New York.

The Republican caucus met on January 14. 149 State legislators attended, and State Senator Cornelius R. Parsons (43rd D.), Ex-Mayor of Rochester, presided. The caucus nominated the Republican boss Thomas C. Platt, who had been briefly a U.S. Senator in 1881, on the first ballot.

1897 Republican caucus for United States Senator result
Candidate	First ballot
✓ Thomas C. Platt	142
Joseph H. Choate	7

The Democratic caucus met on January 18. 46 State legislators attended, but 5 walked out before the roll was called, after making speeches against Hill. The incumbent U.S. Senator David B. Hill was re-nominated.

1897 Democratic caucus for United States Senator result
Candidate	First ballot
✓ David B. Hill	36
Wilbur F. Porter (Note: Wilbur F. Porter (b. ca. 1841), lawyer, five times Mayor of Watertown, ran for Governor in 1896.)	3
Robert C. Titus	2

Thomas C. Platt was the choice of both the Assembly and the state senate, and was declared elected. Four anti-Hill Democrats voted for Labor leader Henry George, who later the same year ran for Mayor of New York as a "Jefferson Democrat" but died a few days before the election.

1897 United States Senator election result
House	Republican		Democrat			
State Senate (50 members)	✓ Thomas C. Platt	35	David B. Hill	11	Henry George	2
State Assembly (150 members)	Thomas C. Platt	112	David B. Hill	31	Henry George	2

Note: The votes were cast on January 19, but both Houses met in a joint session on January 20 to compare nominations, and declare the result.

== Pennsylvania ==
The election in Pennsylvania was held January 19, 1897. Boies Penrose was elected by the Pennsylvania General Assembly. Incumbent Republican J. Donald Cameron, who was elected in an 1877 special election and subsequently re-elected in 1879, 1885, and 1891, was not a candidate for re-election. The Pennsylvania General Assembly, consisting of the House of Representatives and the Senate, convened on January 19, 1897, to elect a new senator to fill the term beginning on March 4, 1897. The results of the vote of both houses combined are as follows:

State Legislature Results
Party	Candidate	Votes	%
Republican	Boies Penrose	210	83.00
Democratic	Chauncey F. Black	39	15.42
Republican	John Wanamaker	1	0.40
N/A	Not voting	3	1.19
Totals		253	100.00%

== South Carolina ==
The election in South Carolina was a unanimous election of the Democratic nominee on January 26, 1897. The Democratic primary election was held on August 26, 1896, and September 9. The Democratic Party of South Carolina organized primary elections for the U.S. Senate beginning in 1896 and the General Assembly would confirm the choice of the Democratic voters. Conservative Democratic Joseph H. Earle won the Democratic primary and was elected by the General Assembly for a six-year term.

In 1896, Governor of South Carolina John Gary Evans entered the first ever election in the state of South Carolina for the U.S. Senate. He had the backing of Senator Ben Tillman and much of the farming interests in the state. However, the farmers' movement had largely run its course and the Tillmanite reform movement had angered a considerable number of voters in the state. Conservative Joseph H. Earle and Newberry native John T. Duncan announced their candidacy's in opposition to Governor Evans. In the primary on August 26 Evans emerged as the frontrunner, but did not garner over 50% of the vote and was forced to face Earle in a runoff election. Those who had voted for Duncan threw their support to Earle and it provided him with the margin he needed for victory over Evans.

South Carolina U.S. Senate Primary Election, 1896
Party	Candidate	Votes	%	±%
Democratic	John Gary Evans	38,802	49.6	
Democratic	Joseph H. Earle	31,092	39.8	
Democratic	John T. Duncan	8,327	10.6	

South Carolina U.S. Senate Primary Election Runoff, 1896
Party	Candidate	Votes	%	±%
Democratic	Joseph H. Earle	42,915	52.0	+12.2
Democratic	John Gary Evans	39,576	48.0	−1.6

== See also ==
- 1896 United States elections
  - 1896 United States House of Representatives elections
  - 1896 United States presidential election
- 54th United States Congress
- 55th United States Congress
