= Red Bluff Lake (disambiguation) =

Red Bluff Lake or Red Buff Reservoir is a reservoir in Pecos, Texas.

Red Bluff Lake may also refer to:

- Red Bluff Lake, a lake formed by the Red Bluff Diversion Dam in Tehama County, California
- Red Bluff Lake, a lake in Red Bluff, South Carolina
