= James Norton (South Carolina politician) =

American politician

Member of the U.S. House of Representatives from South Carolina's 6th district
- In office December 6, 1897 – March 3, 1901
- Preceded by: John L. McLaurin
- Succeeded by: Robert B. Scarborough

Comptroller General of South Carolina
- In office 1894–1897
- Governor: John Gary Evans

Member of the South Carolina House of Representatives
- In office 1907–1908
- In office 1890–1892
- In office 1886–1888

Personal details
- Born: October 8, 1843 Mullins, South Carolina
- Died: October 14, 1920 (aged 77) Mullins, South Carolina
- Party: Democratic
- Profession: Teacher, politician

Military service
- Allegiance: Confederate States of America
- Branch/service: Confederate States Army
- Years of service: 1861–1865
- Unit: Army of Northern Virginia
- Battles/wars: American Civil War

James Norton (October 8, 1843 – October 14, 1920) was a U.S. representative from South Carolina.

Born near Mullins, South Carolina, Norton pursued an academic course, then he left school in 1861 to enter the Confederate States Army. He served throughout the Civil War in the Army of Northern Virginia. After the war, Norton reentered school but did not finish the regular course.

He was a teacher in the public schools 1866–1870, and engaged in agricultural pursuits and merchandising.

Norton was elected county school commissioner in 1870 and reelected in 1872. He served as a member of the Statehouse of representatives in 1886, 1887, 1890, and 1891. He served as assistant comptroller general of South Carolina 1890–1894, then the actual comptroller general of the State from 1894 until 1897, when he resigned.

Norton was elected as a Democrat to the Fifty-fifth Congress to fill the vacancy caused by the resignation of John L. McLaurin. He was re-elected to the Fifty-sixth Congress and served from December 6, 1897, to March 3, 1901. He was not a candidate for reelection in 1900 to the Fifty-seventh Congress.

He resumed agricultural pursuits and also engaged in the real estate business. He was again a member of the Statehouse of representatives in 1907–1908.

He died in Mullins, South Carolina, October 14, 1920. He was interred in Miller's Churchyard.

== Sources ==
- United States Congress. "James Norton (id: N000149)". Biographical Directory of the United States Congress.

U.S. House of Representatives
Preceded by John L. McLaurin	Member of the U.S. House of Representatives from South Carolina's 6th congressional district 1897–1901	Succeeded by Robert B. Scarborough
