= Frank Q. Stuart =

American politician

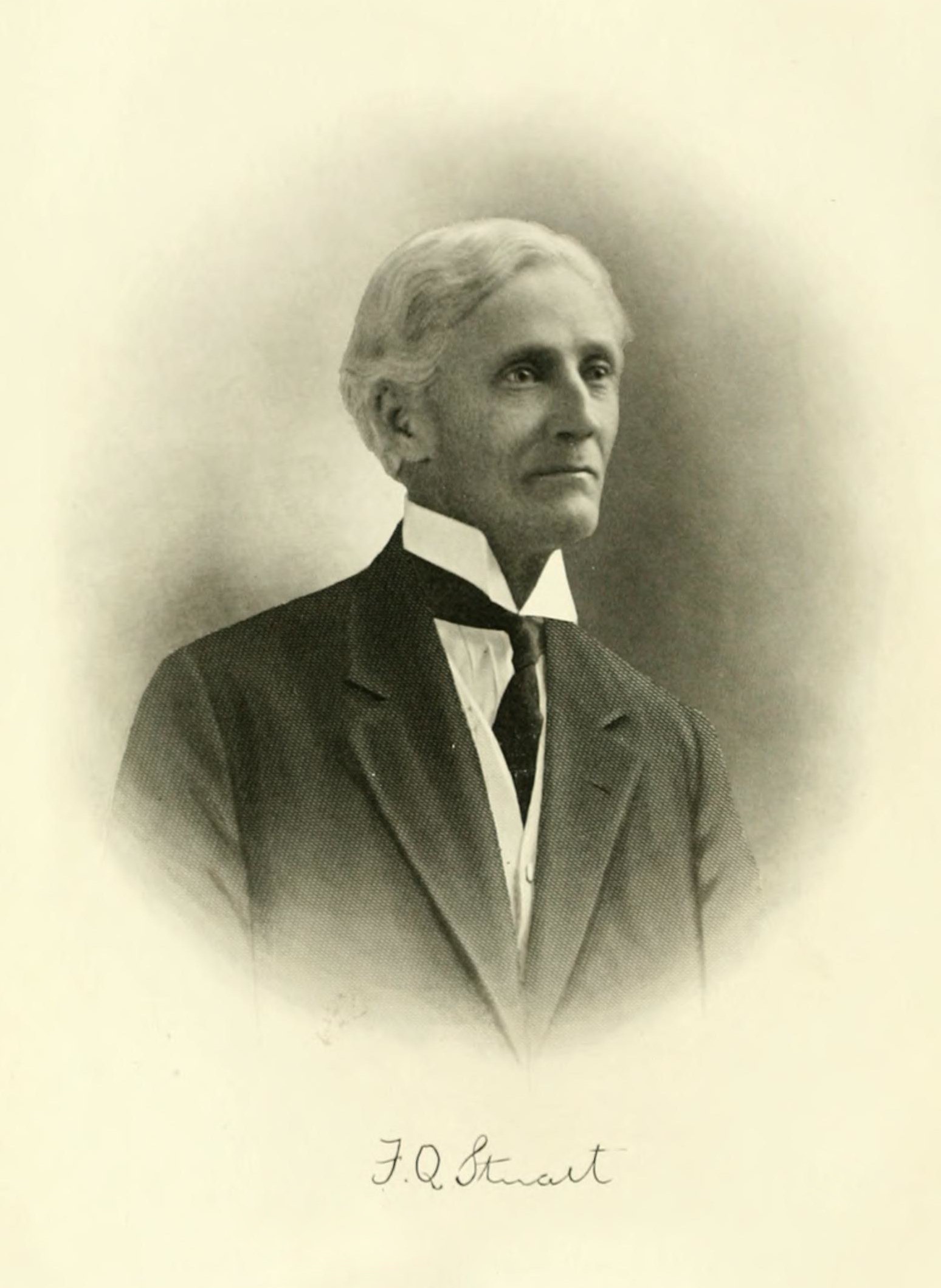
Frank Q. Stuart

Frank Q. Stuart (January 24, 1856 – January 2, 1923) was an American politician active in Colorado and Iowa.

== Biography ==
Frank Q. Stewart was born in Melrose, Iowa. He studied law in Chariton, Iowa. He served in the Colorado House of Representatives during the 6th General Assembly. A Republican at the time, he served in the House on the following committees: Agriculture & Irrigation; Judiciary; Labor; and Reapportionment & State Affairs. He served with his brother, Tom Stuart, the Speaker of the Colorado House of Representatives. He returned to Iowa and was active with the Democratic Party and Populist Party. He received a single vote in the 1896 United States Senate election in Iowa finishing third behind William B. Allison, the Republican incumbent, and Washington Irving Babb, a past state legislator and the Democratic candidate. He died January 2, 1923, in San Francisco, California.
