= Red Bluff, South Carolina =

- Unincorporated community
- Location within South Carolina Location within the United States
- Coordinates: 34°36′41″N 79°30′20″W
- Country: United States
- State: South Carolina
- County: Marlboro
- Elevation: 161 ft (49 m)
- Time zone: UTC-5 (Eastern (EST))
  - Summer (DST): UTC-4 (EDT)
- Area codes: 843, 854
- GNIS feature ID: 1231705

Red Bluff is an unincorporated community, in Marlboro County, South Carolina, United States. Red Bluff Lake, also known as Red Bluff Pond, is in the area and is used for fishing.

John L. McLaurin (1860-1934), lawyer and politician, was born in Red Bluff, in Marlboro County.
