= 1897 United States Senate election in South Carolina =

1896 Democratic Senate primary runoff in South Carolina
- September 9, 1896
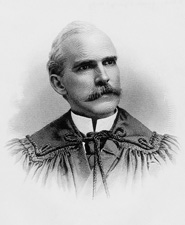

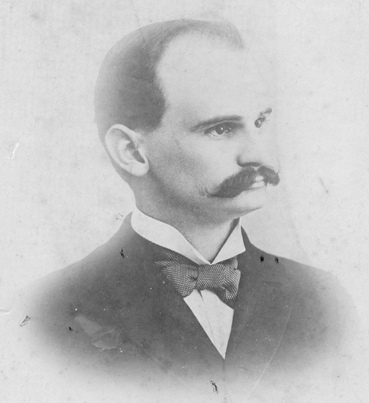
Nominee	Joseph H. Earle	John Gary Evans
Party	Democratic	Democratic
Popular vote	42,915	39,576
Percentage	52%	48%
U.S. senator before election
John L. M. Irby
Democratic
Elected U.S. Senator
Joseph H. Earle
Democratic

The 1897 South Carolina United States Senate election was a unanimous election of the Democratic nominee on January 26, 1897, to select the U.S. Senator from the state of South Carolina. The Democratic primary election was held on August 26, 1896, and September 9. Prior to the ratification of the 17th Amendment to the United States Constitution, U.S. Senators were elected by the state legislature and not through the direct election by the people of the state. However, the Democratic Party of South Carolina organized primary elections for the U.S. Senate beginning in 1896 and the General Assembly would confirm the choice of the Democratic voters. Conservative Democratic Joseph H. Earle won the Democratic primary and was elected by the General Assembly for a six-year term.

== Democratic primary ==
In 1896, Governor of South Carolina John Gary Evans entered the first ever election in the state of South Carolina for the U.S. Senate. He had the backing of Senator Ben Tillman and much of the farming interests in the state. However, the farmers' movement had largely run its course and the Tillmanite reform movement had angered a considerable number of voters in the state. Conservative Joseph H. Earle and Newberry native John T. Duncan announced their candidacy's in opposition to Governor Evans. In the primary on August 26 Evans emerged as the frontrunner, but did not garner over 50% of the vote and was forced to face Earle in a runoff election. Those who had voted for Duncan threw their support to Earle and it provided him with the margin he needed for victory over Evans.

South Carolina U.S. Senate Primary Election, 1896
Party	Candidate	Votes	%	±%
Democratic	John Gary Evans	38,802	49.6	
Democratic	Joseph H. Earle	31,092	39.8	
Democratic	John T. Duncan	8,327	10.6	

South Carolina U.S. Senate Primary Election Runoff, 1896
Party	Candidate	Votes	%	±%
Democratic	Joseph H. Earle	42,915	52.0	+12.2
Democratic	John Gary Evans	39,576	48.0	−1.6

== See also ==
- List of United States senators from South Carolina
- 1896 and 1897 United States Senate elections
- 1896 United States House of Representatives elections in South Carolina
- 1896 South Carolina gubernatorial election
