= John L. McLaurin =

American politician (1860–1934)

John McLaurin
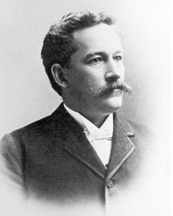

United States Senator from South Carolina
- In office June 1, 1897 – March 3, 1903
- Preceded by: Joseph H. Earle
- Succeeded by: Asbury Latimer

Member of the U.S. House of Representatives from South Carolina's 6th district
- In office December 5, 1892 – May 31, 1897
- Preceded by: Eli T. Stackhouse
- Succeeded by: James Norton

Attorney General of South Carolina
- In office December 10, 1891 – December 5, 1892
- Governor: Benjamin Tillman
- Preceded by: Young J. Pope
- Succeeded by: Daniel Townsend

Member of the South Carolina Senate from the Marlboro County district
- In office January 14, 1913 – November 3, 1914

Member of the South Carolina House of Representatives from the Marion County district
- In office November 25, 1890 – December 10, 1891

Personal details
- Born: John Lowndes McLaurin; May 9, 1860 Marlboro County, South Carolina, U.S.
- Died: July 29, 1934 (aged 74) Bennettsville, South Carolina, U.S.
- Party: Democratic
- Education: Swarthmore College; North Carolina Military Institute (BS); University of Virginia

John Lowndes McLaurin (May 9, 1860 – July 29, 1934) was a United States representative and senator from South Carolina. He was born in Red Bluff, South Carolina, in Marlboro County, South Carolina and attended schools at Bennettsville, South Carolina and Englewood, New Jersey as well as Bethel Military Academy (near Warrenton, Virginia) and Swarthmore College (in Pennsylvania.) He graduated from the Carolina Military Institute, studied law in the University of Virginia at Charlottesville, was admitted to the bar in 1883 and practiced in Bennettsville. He was a member of the South Carolina House of Representatives in 1890-1891 and was attorney general of the State from 1891 to 1892. At a time when Benjamin Tillman was making demagogic appeals to the white working class, McLaurin became one of the first upper-class South Carolinians to support him. Tillman in 1892 pinned the nickname "Little Curly Headed Joe" that stuck for the remainder of McLaurin's life.

McLaurin broke with Tillman in 1894 and they became bitter enemies. Tillman accused him of accepting bribes from the Textile industry, which led to the famous fistfight between the two on the Senate floor on 22 February 1902. Both men were censured.

McLaurin was elected In 1892 as a Democrat to the Fifty-second Congress to fill the vacancy caused by the death of Eli T. Stackhouse; he was reelected to the Fifty-third, Fifty-fourth, and Fifty-fifth Congresses and served from December 5, 1892, until May 31, 1897, when he resigned. He was appointed and subsequently elected as a Democrat to the U.S. Senate to fill the vacancy caused by the death of Joseph H. Earle and served from June 1, 1897, to March 4, 1903; he was not a candidate for reelection. In Congress, he specialized in fiscal affairs.

McLaurin practiced Law in New York City. He later returned to farming in Bennettsville and was Elected to the South Carolina Senate, 1914-1915. He was author of the State warehouse system for storing and financing cotton, and served as State warehouse commissioner from 1915 until his resignation in 1917. He died at his estate near Bennettsville in 1934; interment was in McCall Cemetery. His home, the Robertson-Easterling-McLaurin House, was listed on the National Register of Historic Places in 1984.

== See also ==
- List of federal political scandals in the United States
- List of United States senators expelled or censured

Legal offices
Preceded by Young J. Pope	Attorney General of South Carolina; 1891–1892	Succeeded by Daniel Townsend
U.S. House of Representatives
Preceded by Eli T. Stackhouse	Member of the U.S. House of Representatives from South Carolina's 6th congressional district 1892–1897	Succeeded by James Norton
U.S. Senate
Preceded by Joseph H. Earle	U.S. Senator (Class 3) from South Carolina; 1897–1903; Served alongside: Benjamin Tillman	Succeeded by Asbury Latimer
