= Eli T. Stackhouse =

American politician

Eli Thomas Stackhouse
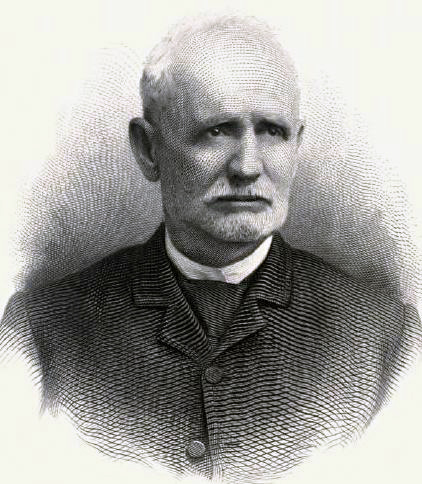

Member of the U.S. House of Representatives from South Carolina's 6th district
- In office March 4, 1891 – June 14, 1892
- Preceded by: George W. Dargan
- Succeeded by: John L. McLaurin

Member of the South Carolina House of Representatives
- In office 1865–1866

Personal details
- Born: March 27, 1824 Little Rock, South Carolina
- Died: June 14, 1892 (aged 68) Washington, D.C.
- Resting place: Little Rock, South Carolina
- Party: Democratic
- Profession: Farmer, soldier, congressman

Military service
- Allegiance: Confederate States of America
- Branch/service: Confederate States Army
- Years of service: 1861–1865
- Rank: Colonel
- Unit: 8th South Carolina Regiment; Army of Northern Virginia
- Battles/wars: American Civil War; First Battle of Bull Run; Battle of Malvern Hill; Battle of Antietam; Battle of Fredericksburg; Battle of Gettysburg; Battle of Chickamauga; Siege of Knoxville; Battle of the Wilderness; Battle of Spotsylvania; Battle of Cold Harbor; Second Battle of Deep Bottom; Battle of Bentonville

Eli Thomas Stackhouse (March 27, 1824 – June 14, 1892) was a U.S. representative from South Carolina and an officer in the Confederate Army of Northern Virginia during the American Civil War.

== Early life ==
Stackhouse was born in Little Rock, South Carolina, on March 27, 1824, and attended the common schools. He worked on his father's farm, though he "sneaked off many a day to go a-fishing." He taught school for several years, from ages 19 to 23, which allowed him to further acquire a sound educational background.

Although he had aspirations in the field of medicine, he abandoned them after meeting and marrying Elizabeth Ann Fore in 1849. After his marriage, Stackhouse transformed his "very poor farm," and "determined to make something of that farm and started to show his neighbors that was in him," resulting in him acquiring "several farm hands as well as several horses and the farm [becoming] itself one of the best in the country."

He was descended from the famous theologian Thomas Stackhouse.

== Civil War ==
Upon the Battle of Fort Sumter (which took place in his native state of South Carolina), Stackhouse enlisted in the Confederate States Army on January 9, 1861, and served throughout the entire Civil War, attaining the rank of colonel of the 8th South Carolina Volunteers.

He enlisted as a private, and was elected captain of the 8 South Carolina Volunteers' Company I, known as "The Spartan Band". He fought and participated in almost every major battle with the Army of Northern Virginia––from his home state's first shot of rebellion until General Joseph Johnston's surrender at Bennett Place.

While fighting behind a stone wall at the Battle of Fredericksburg, and upon seeing a young, dying Union soldier, Stackhouse reportedly said "Son, take my hand and I will pull you over," to which the young soldier was hoisted over.

Stackhouse was wounded eight during the war, with three serious wounds from the battles of Antietam (September 1862), Gettysburg (July 2, 1863), and Second Deep Bottom (June 18, 1864), where he was wounded by a shell fragment.

== Post-war activities ==
After the Union's victory and Emancipation Proclamation, Stackhouse alerted his slaves of their newfound liberation, "[explaining] to them that the result of the War had been to free them... [and] preferred them to seek employment under another employer rather than remain under him who had been their master. Keeping sufficient only for himself and his family he divided his crops among his former slaves."

He served as a member of the South Carolina House of Representatives from 1865 to 1866. He served as member of the first board of trustees of Clemson Agricultural and Mechanical College of South Carolina (now Clemson University) in 1887. He was the first president of the South Carolina State Farmers' Alliance in 1888.

Stackhouse was elected as a Democrat to the Fifty-Second United States Congress and served from March 4, 1891, until his death.

== Death and personal life ==
On June 13, 1892, the day before his death, Stackhouse complained "of the intense heat," which exacerbated his heart disease. At around 1:30 AM the following morning, June 14, his son heard him "breathing laboriously," after which Stackhouse shortly died.

It is written that "Eli Thomas Stackhouse, in appearance, was tall, stood perfectly erect, weighed about 180 pounds, had a large head, steel gray eyes and a ruddy complexion. He wore a beard which he kept closely trimmed."

"He was a consistent member of the Methodist Episcopal Church," and was a "Methodist of the Methodists."

Congressman John L. McLaurin described Stackhouse's disposition:

Candor, sincerity, and conscientiousness were his predominant graces. Indomitable energy, scrupulous honesty, and fidelity were the mainsprings of his success in his industrial and political life. A combination of all these made him an American Cincinnatus.

Stackhouse was interred in Little Rock Cemetery, Little Rock, South Carolina.

== See also ==
- List of members of the United States Congress who died in office (1790–1899)

U.S. House of Representatives
Preceded by George W. Dargan	Member of the U.S. House of Representatives from South Carolina's 6th congressional district 1891–1892	Succeeded by John L. McLaurin
