= John L. M. Irby =

American politician

John Laurens Manning Irby
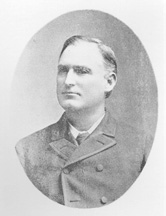

United States Senator from South Carolina
- In office March 4, 1891 – March 4, 1897
- Preceded by: Wade Hampton III
- Succeeded by: Joseph H. Earle

36th Speaker of the South Carolina House of Representatives
- In office November 25, 1890 – December 23, 1890
- Preceded by: James Simons Jr.
- Succeeded by: Ira B. Jones

Member of the South Carolina House of Representatives from Laurens County
- In office November 23, 1886 – December 23, 1890

Personal details
- Born: September 10, 1854 Laurens, South Carolina
- Died: December 9, 1900 (aged 46) Laurens, South Carolina
- Party: Democratic
- Education: Princeton University; University of Virginia

John Laurens Manning Irby (September 10, 1854 – December 9, 1900) was a United States senator from South Carolina.

== Early life ==
Born in Laurens, he attended Laurensville Male Academy (Lauren), Princeton College (Princeton, New Jersey in 1870-1871, and the University of Virginia at Charlottesville from 1871 to 1873.

== Family ==
Joseph H. Earle, Irby's cousin, and Elias Earle, his great-grandfather, had both been members of the U.S. Congress.

== Career ==
He studied law, was admitted to the bar in 1875, commenced practice at Cheraw, and returned to Laurens. He was appointed lieutenant colonel of the South Carolina Militia in 1877 and that year was also intendant of Lauren. He was a member of the South Carolina House of Representatives from 1886 to 1892, serving as speaker in 1890.

Irby was elected as a Democrat to the U.S. Senate and served from March 4, 1891, to March 4, 1897; he was not a candidate for reelection. While in the Senate, he was chairman of the Committee on Transportation Routes to the Seaboard (Fifty-third Congress). Irby was subsequently an unsuccessful candidate for election to the United States Senate in 1897 to fill the vacancy caused by the death of his cousin Joseph H. Earle, and was a delegate to the State constitutional convention in 1895. He resumed the practice of law and also engaged in agricultural pursuits.

== Death ==
Irby died in Laurens around 8 a.m. on December 9, 1900, having suffered from Bright's disease. He was buried in the Laurens city cemetery the following day.

U.S. Senate
Preceded by Wade Hampton III	U.S. senator (Class 3) from South Carolina; 1891–1897; Served alongside: Matthew Butler, Benjamin Tillman	Succeeded by Joseph H. Earle
