= Asbury Latimer =

American politician (1851–1908)

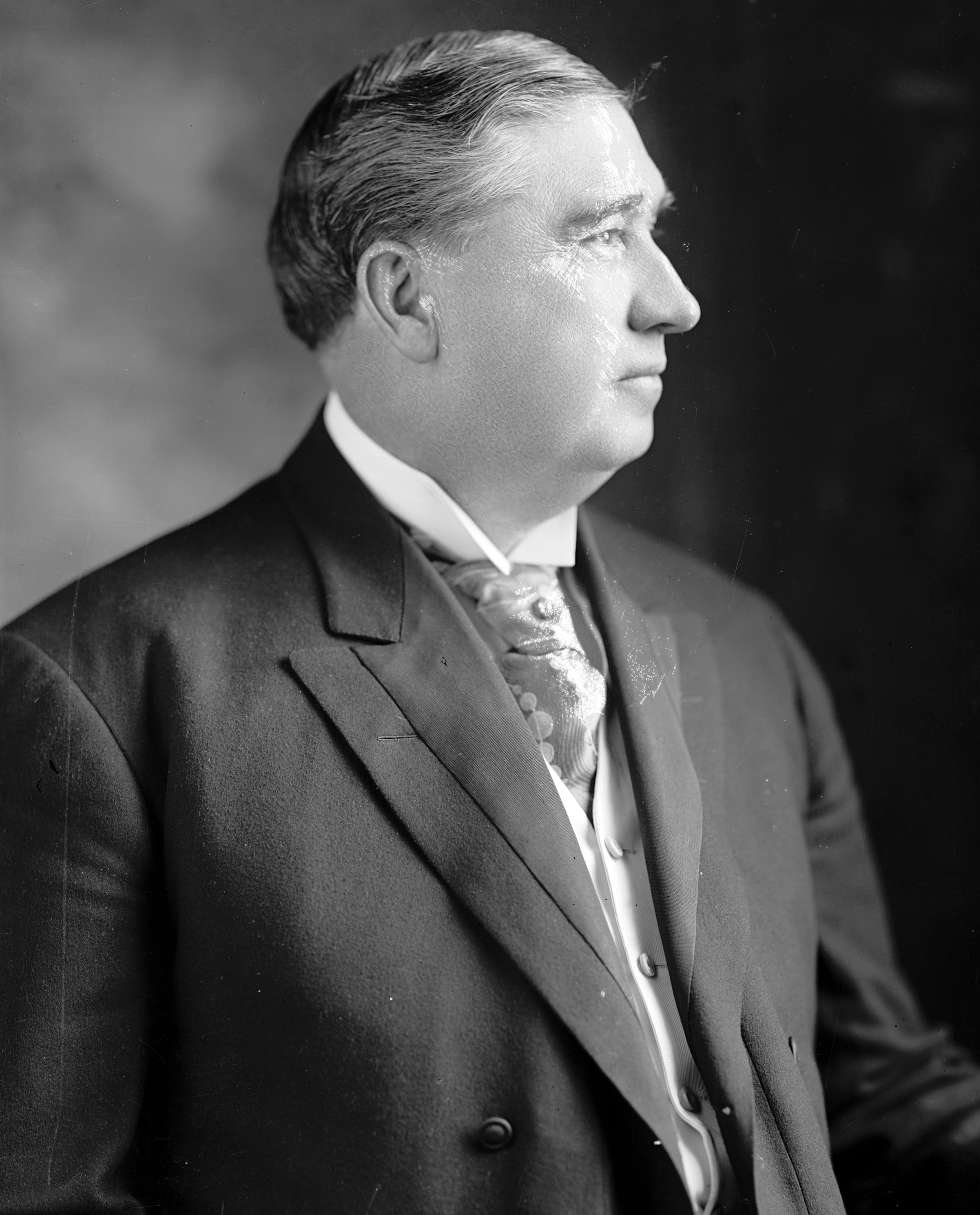
- Harris & Ewing portrait of Latimer, taken between 1905 and 1908

United States Senator from South Carolina
- In office March 4, 1903 – February 20, 1908
- Preceded by: John L. McLaurin
- Succeeded by: Frank B. Gary

Member of the U.S. House of Representatives from South Carolina's 3rd district
- In office March 4, 1893 – March 3, 1903
- Preceded by: George Johnstone
- Succeeded by: Wyatt Aiken

Personal details
- Born: Asbury Churchwell Latimer; July 31, 1851 Lowndesville, South Carolina, US
- Died: February 20, 1908 (aged 56) Washington, D.C., US
- Party: Democratic
- Occupation: Politician

Asbury Churchwell Latimer (July 31, 1851 – February 20, 1908) was an American politician. A Democrat, he was a member of the United States House of Representatives and the United States Senate from South Carolina.

== Early life ==
Latimer was born on July 31, 1851, near Lowndesville, South Carolina, the son of farmer Clement Theophilus Latimer and Frances Beulah (née Young) Latimer. He was a descendent of bishop Hugh Latimer. He was educated at common schools and pursued no further education, as his family was poor. He worked as a farmer, moving to Belton in 1880, working as a farmer there also. As a farmer in Belton, he became prominent in the area's agricultural sector. He later became a lawyer.

== Politics ==
Latimer was a Democrat. He played a role in the uncivil 1876 election era. He rose to political prominence in 1890, during the Farmers' Alliance. That year, he ran for Lieutenant Governor of South Carolina, with Benjamin Tillman as his running mate. In a eulogy, Tillman described him, upon meeting him, as extremely uninformed politically. From 1890 to 1893, he was chairman of the Anderson County Democratic Party.

Latimer served in the United States House of Representatives from March 4, 1893, to March 3, 1903, representing South Carolina's 3rd district. He refused to run in the following election. He was a member of the United States Senate from North Carolina, serving from March 4, 1904, until his death. He primarily worked on agricultural legislation, though in his final term, was a member of the Joint Immigration Commission. In 1906, he helped draft the Pure Food and Drug Act. He supported expanding public roadways in order to benefit the rural south, and as a result was nicknamed "Good Roads" Latimer.

== Personal life and death ==
On June 26, 1877, Latimer married Sara Alice Brown, a niece of Governor Joseph E. Brown. Together, they had five children. Their daughter, Mamie Latimer, was the daughter-in-law of Robert Middleton Heard, who served in the Georgia House of Representatives. He was Methodist.

Latimer died on February 20, 1908, aged 56, in Washington, D.C., from peritonitis, following surgery to treat appendicitis. He was buried at Belton Cemetery. He is the namesake of the Memorial United Methodist Church, in Belton.

== See also ==
- List of members of the United States Congress who died in office (1900–1949)

U.S. House of Representatives
Preceded by George Johnstone	Member of the U.S. House of Representatives from South Carolina's 3rd congressional district 1893–1903	Succeeded by Wyatt Aiken
U.S. Senate
Preceded by John L. McLaurin	U.S. senator (Class 3) from South Carolina; 1903–1908; Served alongside: Benjamin R. Tillman	Succeeded by Frank B. Gary
