= Joseph H. Earle =

American politician (1847–1897)

Joseph Haynsworth Earle
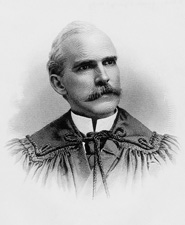

United States Senator from South Carolina
- In office March 4, 1897 – May 20, 1897
- Preceded by: John L. M. Irby
- Succeeded by: John L. McLaurin

South Carolina Attorney General
- In office November 30, 1886 – December 4, 1890
- Governor: John Peter Richardson III
- Preceded by: Charles R. Miles
- Succeeded by: Young J. Pope

Member of the South Carolina Senate from Sumter County
- In office November 28, 1882 – December 24, 1885

Member of the South Carolina House of Representatives from Sumter County
- In office November 26, 1878 – February 20, 1880

Personal details
- Born: April 30, 1847 Greenville, South Carolina, U.S.
- Died: May 20, 1897 (aged 50) Greenville, South Carolina, South Carolina, U.S.
- Party: Democratic

Joseph Haynsworth Earle (April 30, 1847 – May 20, 1897) was a United States senator from South Carolina.

== Biography ==
Born in Greenville, he attended private schools in Sumter. He was a first year cadet at the South Carolina Military Academy (now The Citadel) at the outbreak of the Civil War enlisted in the Confederate Army. Joseph enlisted with the Charles Battery, which at the close of the war was part of Kemper's Artillery, having attained the rank of Sergeant. He graduated from Furman University (Greenville) in 1867, taught school for two years, studied law, was admitted to the bar in 1870 and commenced practice in Anderson. He returned to Sumter in 1875 and continued the practice of law; he was also interested in the logging business and in agricultural pursuits.

Earle was a member of the South Carolina House of Representatives from 1878 to 1882, and was a member of the South Carolina Senate from 1882 to 1886. He was South Carolina Attorney General from 1886 to 1890, declined the nomination for governor, and ran unsuccessfully for that office in 1890. He returned to Greenville in 1892, was elected a circuit judge in 1894, and was elected as a Democrat to the U.S. Senate, serving from March 4, 1897 until his death in Greenville on May 20, 1897. Interment was in Christ Churchyard in Greenville.

== Legacy ==
Joseph Earle was a great-grandson of Elias Earle, a cousin of John Laurens Manning Irby, and a nephew of William Lowndes Yancey, all of whom were members of the U.S. Congress (Yancey also the C.S. Congress).

His birthplace, the Earle Town House, was added to the National Register of Historic Places in 1969.

== See also ==
- List of members of the United States Congress who died in office (1790–1899)

U.S. Senate
Preceded by John L. M. Irby	U.S. senator (Class 3) from South Carolina; 1897; Served alongside: Benjamin Tillman	Succeeded by John L. McLaurin
