= George Johnstone (American politician) =

American politician and lawyer (1846–1921)

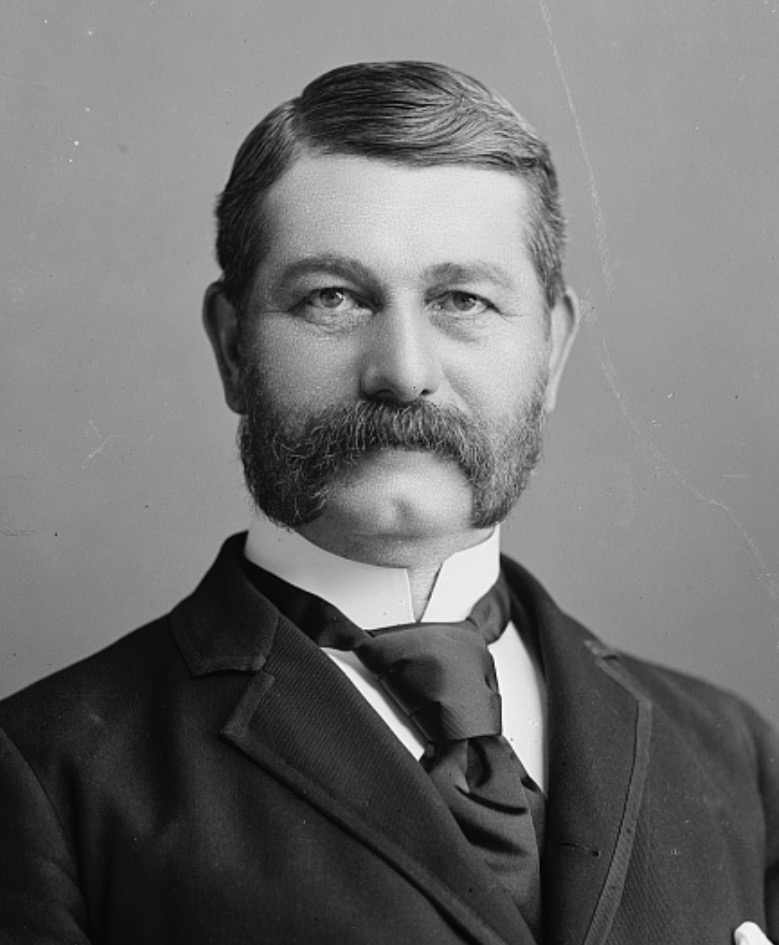
- Portrait of Johnstone by Charles Milton Bell, taken between January 1891 and January 1894

Member of the U.S. House of Representatives from South Carolina's 3rd district
- In office March 4, 1891 – March 3, 1893
- Preceded by: James S. Cothran
- Succeeded by: Asbury Latimer

Member of the South Carolina House of Representatives from the Newberry County district
- In office 1877 – 1884

Personal details
- Born: April 18, 1846 Newberry, South Carolina, US
- Died: March 8, 1921 (aged 74) Newberry, South Carolina, US
- Party: Democratic
- Education: South Carolina State Military Academy; University of Edinburgh
- Profession: Politician, lawyer

Military service
- Allegiance: Confederate States of America
- Branch/service: Confederate States Army
- Years of service: 1864
- Unit: South Carolina Corps of Cadets
- Battles/wars: American Civil War

George Johnstone (April 18, 1846 – March 8, 1921) was an American politician and lawyer. A Democrat, he was a member of the United States House of Representatives from South Carolina.

== Early life and military service ==
Johnstone was born on April 18, 1846, in Newberry, South Carolina, the son of lawyer Chancellor Job Johnstone and Amelia DeWalt. His younger brother, Alan Johnstone, was a member of the South Carolina Senate.

Johnstone was educated at common schools. In January 1864, he enrolled at The Citadel, and in late 1864, enlisted into the South Carolina Corps of Cadets, of the Confederate States Army. He caught an illness during his deployment and was returned to Newberry. From 1866 to 1868, he studied at the University of Edinburgh, and from 1868 to 1870, studied in Paris. He was admitted to the bar at some point between 1871 and 1873, after which he commenced practice in Newberry.

== Politics ==
Johnstone was a Democrat. In 1874, he declined a nomination to the South Carolina House of Representatives, though later served from 1877 to 1884, representing Newberry County. During his tenure, he was a member of the Committee on Ways and Means. In 1881, he worked to revise and amend the Constitution of South Carolina, namely its tax codes. He refused to run in the following election.

On multiple occasions, Johnstone was nominated to the South Carolina Senate, declining all the nominations, saying that he was better heard in the House of Representatives. He was a member of the South Carolina Democratic Executive Committee from 1880 to 1884.

Johnstone served in the United States House of Representatives from March 4, 1891, to March 3, 1893, representing South Carolina's 3rd district. He lost the primaries of the follow election. He later unsuccessfully ran for the United States Senate. He was a delegate to the 1895 South Carolina state constitutional Election.

== Personal and later life ==
After serving in Congress, Johnstone returned to practicing law in Newberry. In 1903, he was a member of the defence team in the trial of politician James H. Tillman for murdering journalist Narciso Gener Gonzales. He also owned a farm in Newberry.

On April 8, 1896, Johnstone married Katie Rutherford. He died on March 8, 1921, aged 74, in Newberry, from an illness which inflicted a stroke and paralysis. He was buried at Johnstone Cemetery, in Newberry.

U.S. House of Representatives
Preceded by James S. Cothran	Member of the U.S. House of Representatives from South Carolina's 3rd congressional district 1891–1893	Succeeded by Asbury Latimer
