= John J. Hemphill =

American politician (1849–1912)

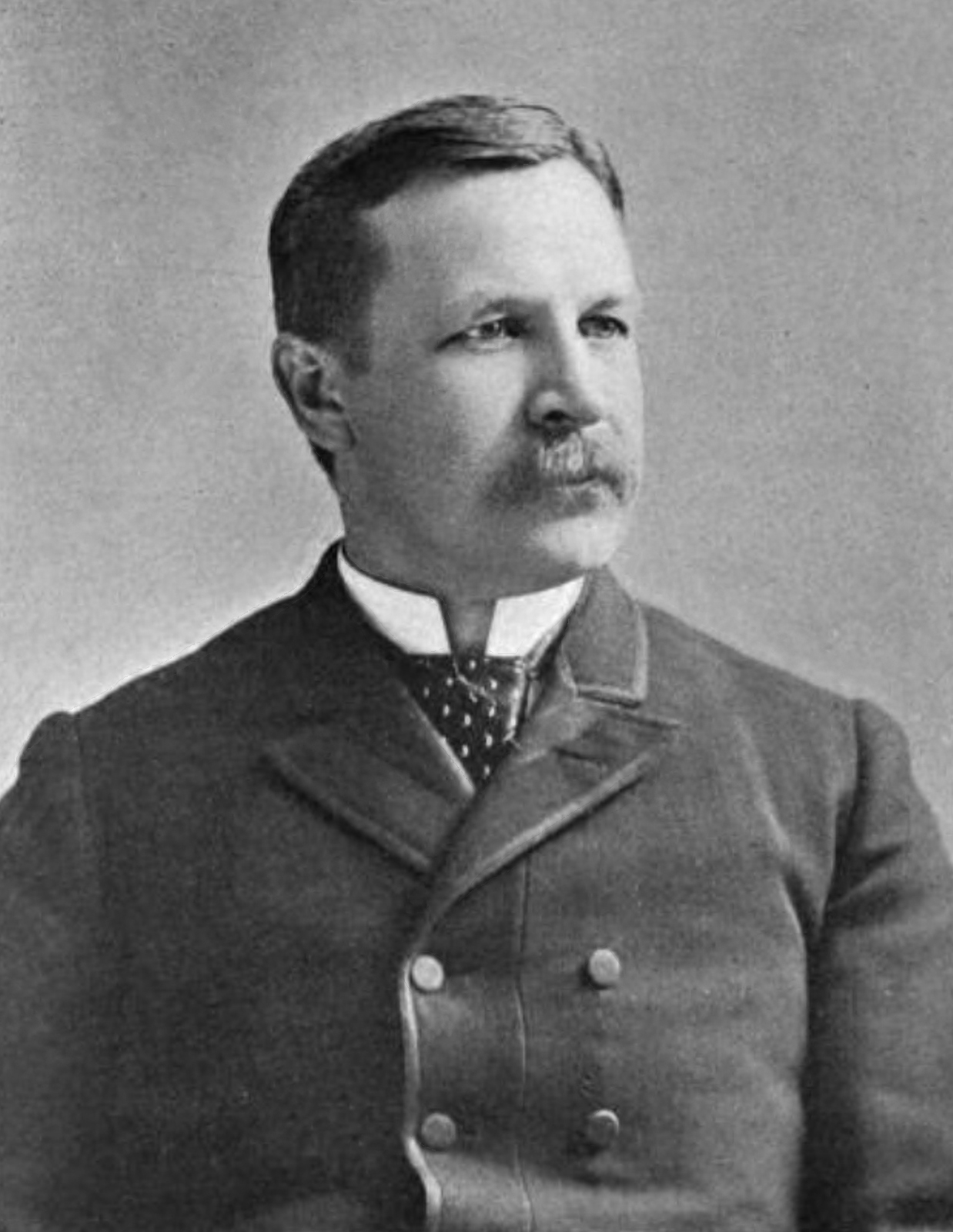

Member of the U.S. House of Representatives from South Carolina's 5th district
- In office March 4, 1883 – March 3, 1893
- Preceded by: Robert Smalls
- Succeeded by: Thomas J. Strait

Member of the South Carolina House of Representatives
- In office 1876 – 1882

Personal details
- Born: John James Hemphill; August 25, 1849 Chester, South Carolina, U.S.
- Died: May 11, 1912 (aged 62) Washington, D.C., U.S.
- Resting place: Oak Hill Cemetery; Washington, D.C., U.S.
- Party: Democratic
- Spouse(s): Addie Avery (died) Elizabeth S. Henry
- Children: 1
- Relatives: William H. Brawley (cousin); J. C. Hemphill (cousin); John Hemphill (uncle); Robert Witherspoon Hemphill (great-nephew)
- Education: University of South Carolina
- Profession: Lawyer; politician; writer

John James Hemphill (August 25, 1849 – May 11, 1912) was a U.S. representative from South Carolina.

== Early life ==
John James Hemphill was born on August 25, 1849, in Chester, South Carolina, to James H. Hemphill. He attended public schools and was graduated from the University of South Carolina at Columbia in 1869. He studied law under his father and was admitted to the bar in 1870.

== Career ==
After graduating, Hemphill practiced law in Chester. He was an unsuccessful candidate for the state legislature in 1874. He served as member of the South Carolina House of Representatives from 1876 to 1882. He was elected as a Democrat to the Forty-eighth and to the four succeeding Congresses (March 4, 1883 – March 3, 1893). He served as chairman of the committee on the District of Columbia (Fiftieth and Fifty-second Congresses). He was an unsuccessful candidate for reelection in 1892 to the Fifty-third Congress. He resumed the practice of law in Washington, D.C. at the Washington Loan and Trust Building, while retaining his residence in South Carolina. He was an unsuccessful candidate for election as United States Senator from South Carolina in 1902. He wrote a number of books, including Why The Solid South.

In 1912, Hemphill was a member of the board of trustees of George Washington University.

== Personal life ==
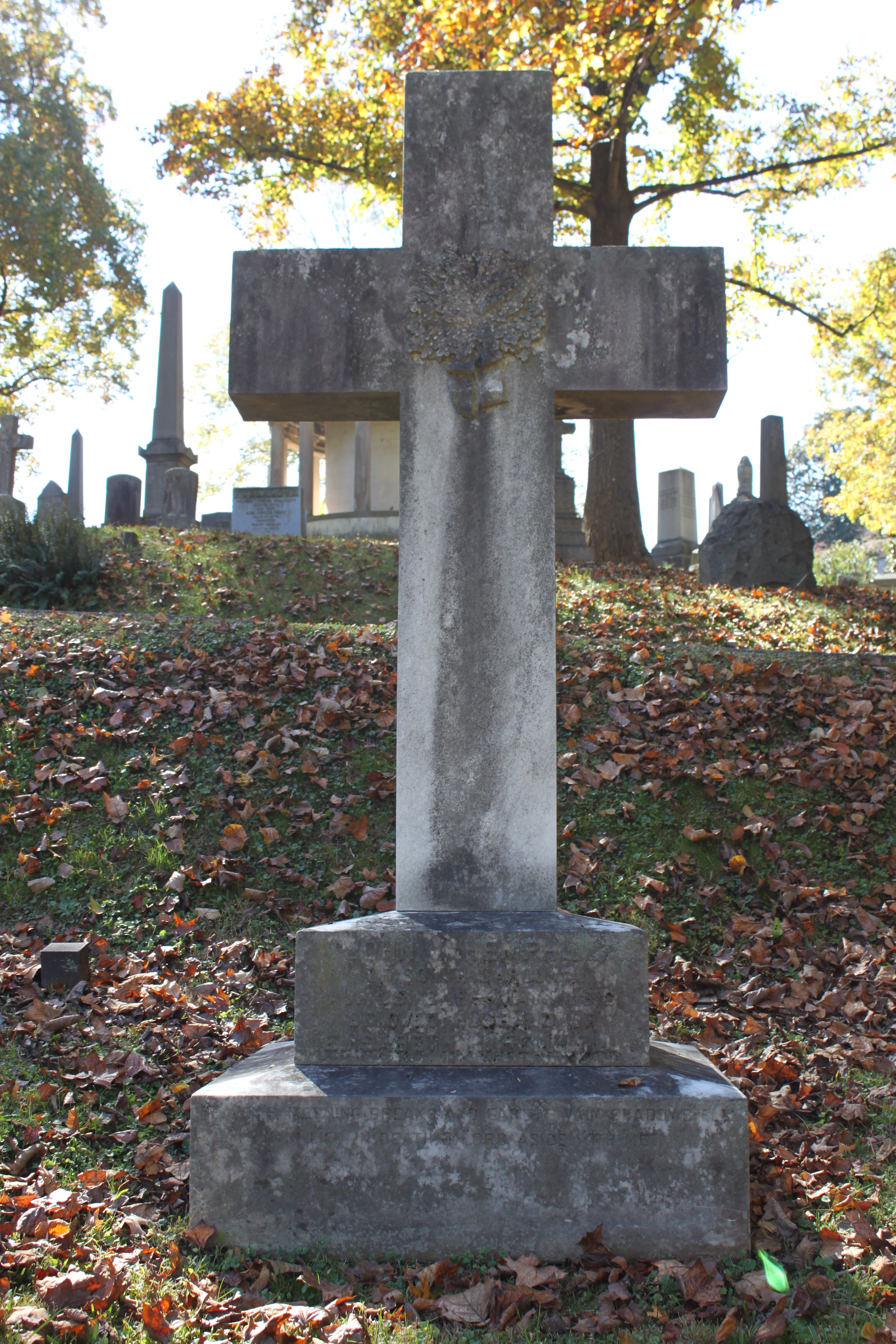
Grave of Hemphill at Oak Hill Cemetery

Hemphill married Addie Avery, granddaughter of John Motley Morehead, of Morganton, North Carolina. She died. He then married Elizabeth S. Henry of Maryland. They had a son, John J. Jr. His cousin William H. Brawley, uncle John Hemphill and great-nephew Robert Witherspoon Hemphill were all politicians. He was also cousins with editor J. C. Hemphill. He was a member of the Metropolitan Club and the Chevy Chase Club.

Hemphill died on May 11, 1912, at his home on Bancroft Place in Washington, D.C. He was interred in Oak Hill Cemetery in Washington, D.C. His pallbearers included James S. Sherman and Joseph McKenna.

U.S. House of Representatives
Preceded by Robert Smalls	Member of the U.S. House of Representatives from South Carolina's 5th congressional district 1883-1893	Succeeded by Thomas J. Strait
