= 1896 United States House of Representatives elections =

House elections for the 55th U.S. Congress

- November 3, 1896 (Note: Three states held early elections between June 1 and September 14.)

All 357 seats in the United States House of Representatives 179 seats needed for a majority
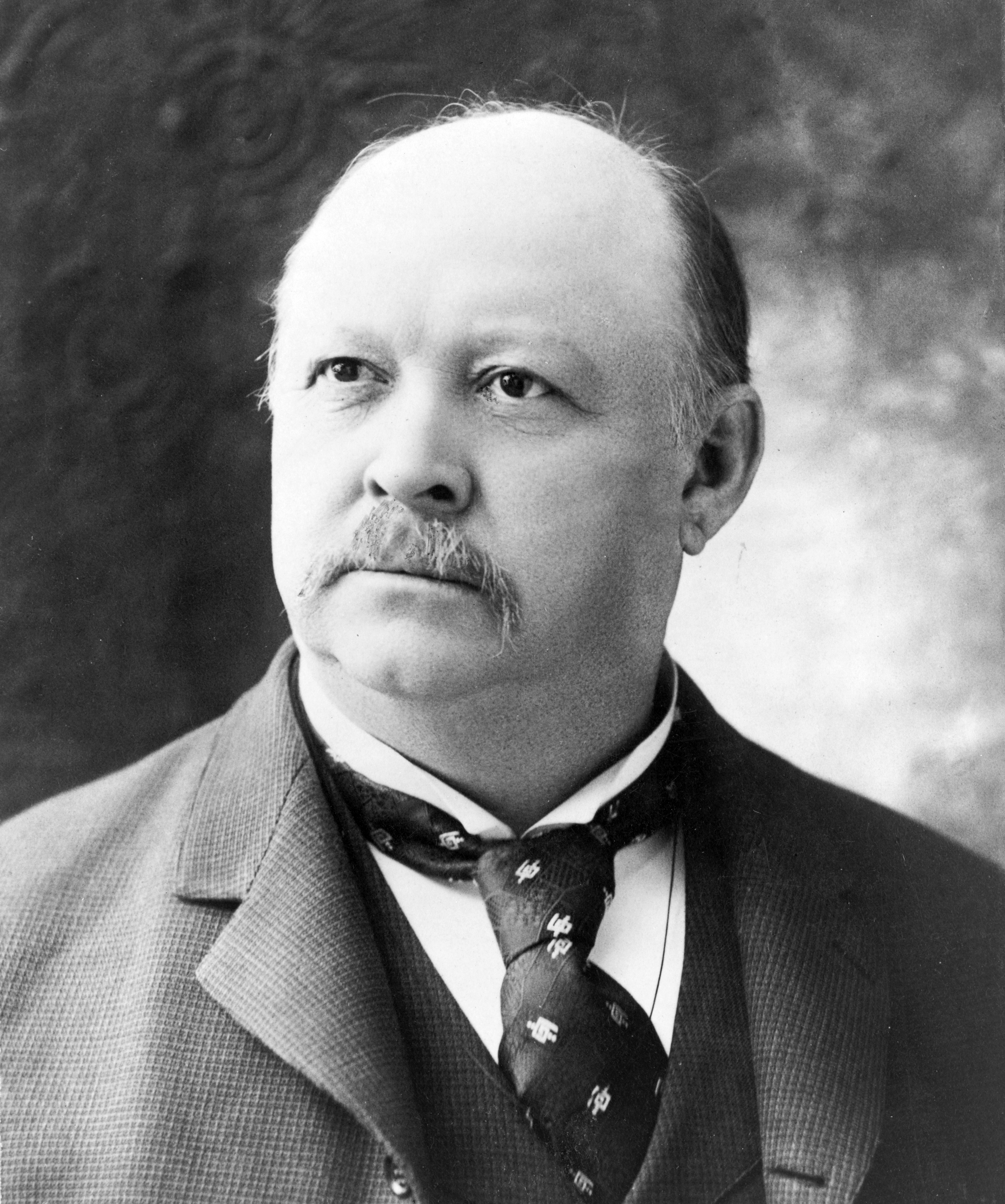

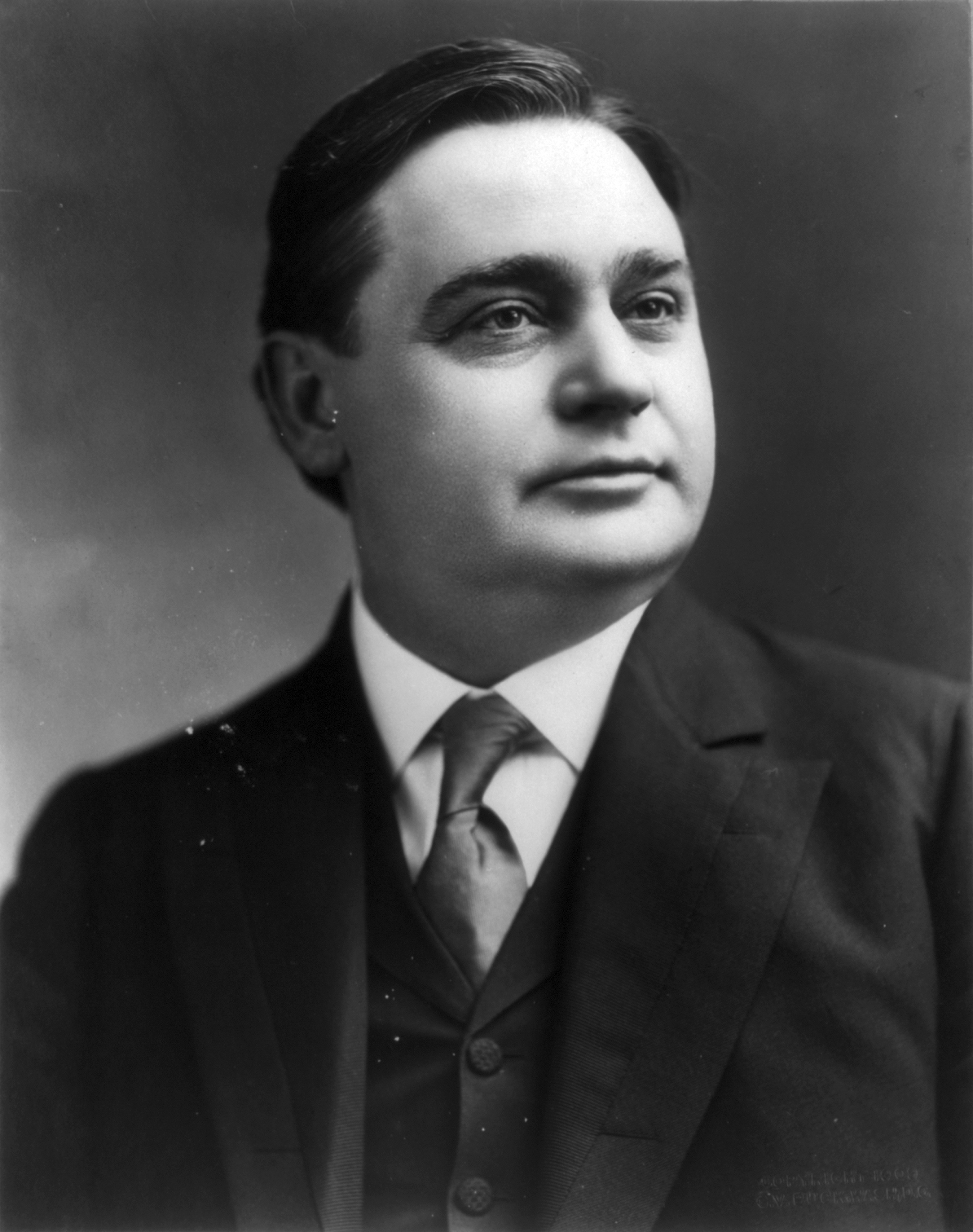
	Majority party	Minority party
Leader	Thomas Brackett Reed	Joseph W. Bailey
Party	Republican	Democratic
Leader's seat	Maine 1st	Texas 5th
Last election	254 seats	93 seats
Seats won	206	124
Seat change	▼48	▲31
Popular vote	6,655,919	5,594,384
Percentage	48.77%	40.99%
Swing	▲0.50pp	▲3.27pp
	Third party	Fourth party
Party	Populist	Silver Republican
Last election	9 seats	Pre-creation
Seats won	22	3
Seat change	▲13	▲3
Popular vote	935,636	139,132
Percentage	6.86%	1.02%
Swing	▼4.16pp	New party
	Fifth party	Sixth party
Party	Silver	Independent Republican
Last election	1	0
Seats won	1	1
Seat change	Steady	▲1
Popular vote	6,429	72,945
Percentage	0.05%	0.53%
Swing	▲0.01pp	▼0.20pp
Speaker before election
Thomas Reed
Republican
Elected Speaker
Thomas Reed
Republican

The 1896 United States House of Representatives elections were held for the most part on November 3, 1896, with Oregon, Maine, and Vermont holding theirs early in either June or September. They coincided with the election of President William McKinley. Elections were held for 357 seats of the United States House of Representatives, representing 45 states, to serve in the 55th United States Congress. The size of the House increased by one seat after Utah gained statehood on January 4, 1896. Special elections were also held throughout the year.

The Republican Party maintained its large majority in the House but lost 48 seats, mostly to the Democratic and Populist parties. The Republican losses were most likely due to the extraordinary gains that party made in the prior elections, when many normally Democratic districts voted Republican due to the severity of and fallout from the Panic of 1893. The Democratic Party recovered in the Mid-Atlantic and Midwestern districts dominated by Catholic and working-class voters. In the Western United States, the Populist Party made large gains and several Republicans broke away over the national party platform's endorsement of a gold standard.

This election marked the zenith of the Populist Party. The Populists would lose most of their seats in the 1898 elections and thereafter slowly fade from prominence.

== Election summaries ==
↓
124	22	5	206
Democratic	Pop	(Note: 1 Silver, 3 Silver Republican, and 1 Independent Republican)	Republican

State	Type	Total seats	Democratic		Populist		Silver		Silver Republican		Ind. Republican		Republican	
State	Type	Total seats	Seats	Change	Seats	Change	Seats	Change	Seats	Change	Seats	Change	Seats	Change
Alabama	District	9	7	▲2	1	▼1	0	Steady	0	Steady	0	Steady	1	▼1
Arkansas	District	6	6	Steady	0	Steady	0	Steady	0	Steady	0	Steady	0	Steady
California	District	7	2	▲1	2	▲2	0	Steady	0	Steady	0	Steady	3	▼3
Colorado	District	2	0	Steady	1	Steady	0	Steady	1	▲1	0	Steady	0	▼1
Connecticut	District	4	0	Steady	0	Steady	0	Steady	0	Steady	0	Steady	4	Steady
Delaware	At-large	1	1	▲1	0	Steady	0	Steady	0	Steady	0	Steady	0	▼1
Florida	District	2	2	Steady	0	Steady	0	Steady	0	Steady	0	Steady	0	Steady
Georgia	District	11	11	Steady	0	Steady	0	Steady	0	Steady	0	Steady	0	Steady
Idaho	At-large	1	0	Steady	1	▲1	0	Steady	0	Steady	0	Steady	0	▼1
Illinois	District	22	5	▲3	0	Steady	0	Steady	0	Steady	0	Steady	17	▼3
Indiana	District	13	4	▲4	0	Steady	0	Steady	0	Steady	0	Steady	9	▼4
Iowa	District	11	0	Steady	0	Steady	0	Steady	0	Steady	0	Steady	11	Steady
Kansas	District +at-large	8	0	Steady	6	▲5	0	Steady	0	Steady	0	Steady	2	▼5
Kentucky	District	11	7	▲1	0	Steady	0	Steady	0	Steady	0	Steady	4	▼1
Louisiana	District	6	6	Steady	0	Steady	0	Steady	0	Steady	0	Steady	0	Steady
Maine (Note: Elections held early.)	District	4	0	Steady	0	Steady	0	Steady	0	Steady	0	Steady	4	Steady
Maryland	District	6	0	▼3	0	Steady	0	Steady	0	Steady	0	Steady	6	▲3
Massachusetts	District	13	1	Steady	0	Steady	0	Steady	0	Steady	0	Steady	12	Steady
Michigan	District	12	2	▲2	0	Steady	0	Steady	0	Steady	0	Steady	10	▼2
Minnesota	District	7	0	Steady	0	Steady	0	Steady	0	Steady	0	Steady	7	Steady
Mississippi	District	7	7	Steady	0	Steady	0	Steady	0	Steady	0	Steady	0	Steady
Missouri	District	15	12	▲7	0	Steady	0	Steady	0	Steady	0	Steady	3	▼7
Montana	At-large	1	0	Steady	0	Steady	0	Steady	1	▲1	0	Steady	0	▼1
Nebraska	District	6	0	Steady	4	▲3	0	Steady	0	Steady	0	Steady	2	▼3
Nevada	At-large	1	0	Steady	0	Steady	1	Steady	0	Steady	0	Steady	0	Steady
New Hampshire	District	2	0	Steady	0	Steady	0	Steady	0	Steady	0	Steady	2	Steady
New Jersey	District	8	0	Steady	0	Steady	0	Steady	0	Steady	0	Steady	8	Steady
New York	District	34	5	▼1	0	Steady	0	Steady	0	Steady	0	Steady	29	▲1
North Carolina	District	9	1	▼1	5	▲1	0	Steady	0	Steady	0	Steady	3	Steady
North Dakota	At-large	1	0	Steady	0	Steady	0	Steady	0	Steady	0	Steady	1	Steady
Ohio	District	21	6	▲4	0	Steady	0	Steady	0	Steady	0	Steady	15	▼4
Oregon	District	2	0	Steady	0	Steady	0	Steady	0	Steady	0	Steady	2	Steady
Pennsylvania	District +2 at-large	30	3	▲1	0	Steady	0	Steady	0	Steady	1	▲1	26	▼2
Rhode Island	District	2	0	Steady	0	Steady	0	Steady	0	Steady	0	Steady	2	Steady
South Carolina	District	7	7	▲1	0	Steady	0	Steady	0	Steady	0	Steady	0	▼1
South Dakota	At-large	2	0	Steady	2	▲2	0	Steady	0	Steady	0	Steady	0	▼2
Tennessee	District	10	8	▲2	0	Steady	0	Steady	0	Steady	0	Steady	2	▼2
Texas	District	13	12	Steady	0	Steady	0	Steady	0	Steady	0	Steady	1	Steady
Utah	At-large	1	1	▲1	0	Steady	0	Steady	0	Steady	0	Steady	0	▼1
Vermont	District	2	0	Steady	0	Steady	0	Steady	0	Steady	0	Steady	2	Steady
Virginia	District	10	6	▼2	0	Steady	0	Steady	0	Steady	0	Steady	4	▲2
Washington (Note: While Dubin (p. 320) indicates the two representatives elected to serve Washington state, J. Hamilton Lewis and William C. Jones, were Populists, most other sources (e.g. Martis, pp. 150–151, etc.) indicate that they were elected as a Democrat and a Silver Republican, respectively.)	At-large	2	1	▲1	0	Steady	0	Steady	1	▲1	0	Steady	0	▼2
West Virginia	District	4	0	Steady	0	Steady	1	Steady	3	▲3	0	Steady	0	Steady
Wisconsin	District	10	0	Steady	0	Steady	0	Steady	0	Steady	0	Steady	10	Steady
Wyoming	At-large	1	1	▲1	0	Steady	0	Steady	0	Steady	0	Steady	0	▼1
Total		357	124 34.7%	▲31	22 6.2%	▲13	1 0.3%	0	3 0.8%	Steady	1 0.3%	▲1	206 57.7%	▼48

Popular vote
Democratic	40.99%
Independent	0.53%
Populist	6.86%
Republican	48.77%
Silver	0.05%
Silver Republican	1.02%
Others	1.78%

House seats
Democratic	34.73%
Independent	0.28%
Populist	6.16%
Republican	57.70%
Silver	0.28%
Silver Republican	0.84%

=== Maps ===
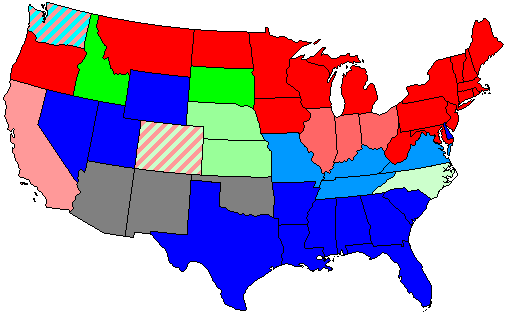
House seats by party holding plurality in state ("Republican" includes Silver, Silver Republican, and Independent Republican): 80+ to 100% Democratic / 80+ to 100% Populist / 80+ to 100% Republican; 60+ to 80% Democratic / 60+ to 80% Populist / 60+ to 80% Republican; Up to 60% Democratic / Up to 60% Populist / Up to 60% Republican

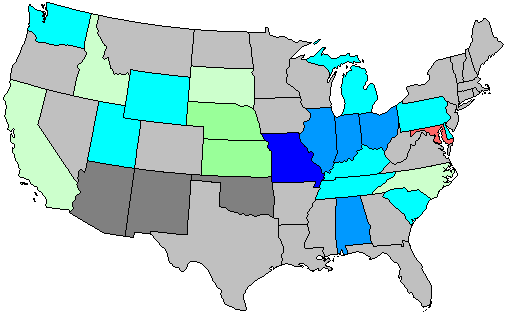
Net gain in party representation ("Republican" includes Silver, Silver Republican, and Independent Republican): 6+ Democratic gain / / 6+ Republican gain; 3–5 Democratic gain / 3–5 Populist gain / 3–5 Republican gain; 1–2 Democratic gain / 1–2 Populist gain / 1–2 Republican gain; no net change

Winner's vote share in each congressional district
Republican vote share in each congressional district

Democratic vote share in each congressional district

Populist vote share in each congressional district

== Special elections ==
District	Incumbent			This race	
District	Member	Party	First elected	Results	Candidates
Virginia 5
South Carolina 7	J. William Stokes	Democratic	1894	Incumbent's previous election declared void June 1, 1896 due to electoral fraud. Incumbent re-elected November 3, 1896. Incumbent also elected to the next term; see below.	▌ ✓ J. William Stokes (Democratic); [data missing]

== Early election dates ==
Three states, with 8 seats between them, held elections early in 1896:

- June 1: Oregon
- September 1: Vermont
- September 14: Maine

== Alabama ==
District	Incumbent			This race	
District	Member	Party	First elected	Results	Candidates
Alabama 1	Richard H. Clarke	Democratic	1888	Incumbent retired to run for Governor of Alabama. Democratic hold.	▌ ✓ George W. Taylor (Democratic) 70.50%; ▌Frank H. Threatt (Republican) 25.38%; ▌Emory C. Stearnes (Populist) 3.84%
Alabama 2	Jesse F. Stallings	Democratic	1892	Incumbent re-elected.	▌ ✓ Jesse F. Stallings (Democratic) 55.94%; ▌Thomas H. Clarke (National Democratic) 25.63%; ▌John C. Fonville (Populist) 18.43%
Alabama 3	George P. Harrison Jr.	Democratic	1894	Incumbent retired. Democratic hold.	▌ ✓ Henry D. Clayton Jr. (Democratic) 52.61%; ▌George L. Comer (National Democratic) 25.94%; ▌Emmet C. Jackson (Populist) 21.45%
Alabama 4	William F. Aldrich	Republican	1894	Incumbent lost re-election. Democratic gain.	▌ ✓ Thomas S. Plowman (Democratic) 56.3%; ▌ William F. Aldrich (Republican/Populist) 40.1%; ▌Edmund H. Dryer (National Democratic) 3.6%
Alabama 4	William F. Aldrich	Republican	1894	Election successfully contested. Incumbent re-elected and seated February 9, 1898.	▌ ✓ William F. Aldrich (Republican/Populist) 49.75%; ▌Thomas S. Plowman (Democratic) 45.59%; ▌Edmund H. Dryer (National Democratic) 4.66%
Alabama 5	Albert T. Goodwyn	Populist	1894	Incumbent lost re-election. Democratic gain.	▌ ✓ Willis Brewer (Democratic) 60.85%; ▌Albert T. Goodwyn (Populist/Republican) 39.15%
Alabama 6	John H. Bankhead	Democratic	1886	Incumbent re-elected.	▌ ✓ John H. Bankhead (Democratic) 55.07%; ▌A. S. Van de Graff (National Democratic) 27.05%; ▌George S. Youngblood (Populist) 17.88%
Alabama 7	Milford W. Howard	Populist	1894	Incumbent re-elected.	▌ ✓ Milford W. Howard (Populist) 35.79%; ▌William I. Bullock (Democratic) 32.66%; ▌James J. Curtis (Republican) 28.91%; ▌George H. Parker (National Democratic) 2.64%
Alabama 8	Joseph Wheeler	Democratic	1884	Incumbent re-elected.	▌ ✓ Joseph Wheeler (Democratic) 56.66%; ▌Oscar W. Hundley (Republican) 42.13%; ▌W. W. Callahan (National Democratic) 1.21%
Alabama 9	Truman H. Aldrich	Republican	1894	Incumbent retired. Democratic gain.	▌ ✓ Oscar Underwood (Democratic) 62.98%; ▌Grattan B. Crowe (Republican/Populist) 26.21%; ▌Archibald Lawson (National Democratic) 10.81%

== Arkansas ==
District	Incumbent			This race	
District	Member	Party	First elected	Results	Candidates
Arkansas 1	Philip D. McCulloch Jr.	Democratic	1892	Incumbent re-elected.	▌ ✓ Philip D. McCulloch Jr. (Democratic) 76.8%; ▌ Francis William Tucker (Republican) 23.2%
Arkansas 2	John S. Little	Democratic	1894	Incumbent re-elected.	▌ ✓ John S. Little (Democratic) 74.7%; ▌ Charles D. Greaves (Republican) 25.3%
Arkansas 3	Thomas C. McRae	Democratic	1885	Incumbent re-elected.	▌ ✓ Thomas C. McRae (Democratic) 70.0%; ▌ J. B. Friedheim (Republican) 30.0%
Arkansas 4	William L. Terry	Democratic	1890	Incumbent re-elected.	▌ ✓ William L. Terry (Democratic) 70.6%; ▌ C. C. Waters (Republican) 29.4%
Arkansas 5	Hugh A. Dinsmore	Democratic	1892	Incumbent re-elected.	▌ ✓ Hugh A. Dinsmore (Democratic) 65.9%; ▌ W. H. Neal (Republican) 34.1%
Arkansas 6	Robert Neill	Democratic	1892	Incumbent retired. Democratic hold.	▌ ✓ Stephen Brundidge Jr. (Democratic) 77.4%; ▌ Benjamin F. Bodenhammer (Republican) 22.7%

== California ==
District	Incumbent			This race	
District	Member	Party	First elected	Results	Candidates
California 1	John All Barham	Republican	1894	Incumbent re-elected.	▌ ✓ John All Barham (Republican) 49.7%; ▌Fletcher A. Cutler (Democratic) 45.5%; ▌George W. Montieth (Populist) 4.2%; ▌B. F. Taylor (Prohibition) 0.7%
California 2	Grove L. Johnson	Republican	1894	Incumbent lost re-election. Democratic gain.	▌ ✓ Marion De Vries (Democratic/Populist) 55.5%; ▌Grove L. Johnson (Republican) 42.3%; ▌F. E. Coulter (Prohibition) 2.2%
California 3	Samuel G. Hilborn	Republican	1894	Incumbent re-elected.	▌ ✓ Samuel G. Hilborn (Republican) 54.0%; ▌Warren B. English (Democratic/Populist) 44.0%; ▌John H. Eustice (Socialist Labor) 1.1%; ▌William Shafer (Prohibition) 0.9%
California 4	James G. Maguire	Democratic	1892	Incumbent re-elected.	▌ ✓ James G. Maguire (Democratic/Populist) 61.0%; ▌Thomas B. O'Brien (Republican) 35.0%; ▌E. T. Kingsley (Socialist Labor) 3.1%; ▌Joseph Rowell (Prohibition) 1.0%
California 5	Eugene F. Loud	Republican	1890	Incumbent re-elected.	▌ ✓ Eugene F. Loud (Republican) 48.6%; ▌Joseph P. Kelly (Democratic) 26.4%; ▌A. H. Kinne (Populist) 22.2%; ▌Henry Daniels (Socialist Labor) 1.8%; ▌T. H. Lawson (Prohibition) 1.0%
California 6	James McLachlan	Republican	1892	Incumbent lost re-election. Populist gain.	▌ ✓ Charles A. Barlow (Populist/Democratic) 48.9%; ▌James McLachlan (Republican) 47.6%; ▌Henry Clay Needham (Prohibition) 2.4%; ▌Job Harriman (Socialist Labor) 1.1%
California 7	William W. Bowers	Republican	1890	Incumbent lost re-election. Populist gain.	▌ ✓ Curtis H. Castle (Populist/Democratic) 46.7%; ▌William W. Bowers (Republican) 46.1%; ▌William H. Carlson (Independent) 5.2%; ▌James W. Webb (Prohibition) 2.0%

== Colorado ==
District	Incumbent			This race	
District	Member	Party	First elected	Results	Candidates
Colorado 1	John F. Shafroth	Republican	1894	Incumbent re-elected as a Silver Republican. Silver Republican gain.	▌ ✓ John F. Shafroth (Fusion) 84.9%; ▌ T. E. McClelland (Republican) 12.1%; ▌ W. F. Steele (Prohibition) 3.0%
Colorado 2	John C. Bell	Populist	1892	Incumbent re-elected.	▌ ✓ John C. Bell (Fusion) 84.5%; ▌ T. F. Hoffmire (Republican) 14.5%

== Connecticut ==
District	Incumbent			This race	
District	Member	Party	First elected	Results	Candidates
Connecticut 1	E. Stevens Henry	Republican	1894	Incumbent re-elected.	▌ ✓ E. Stevens Henry (Republican) 66.7%; ▌Joseph P. Tuttle (Democratic) 26.2%; ▌E. Henry Hyde (Nat. Democratic) 5.1%; ▌James I. Bartholomew (Prohibition) 1.2%; ▌Samuel Joseph (Socialist Labor) 0.8%
Connecticut 2	Nehemiah D. Sperry	Republican	1894	Incumbent re-elected.	▌ ✓ Nehemiah D. Sperry (Republican) 59.2%; ▌Austin B. Fuller (Democratic) 36.8%; ▌Daniel C. Wood (Nat. Democratic) 2.0%; ▌[FNU] Sullivan (Socialist Labor) 1.2%; ▌Edwin P. Augur (Prohibition) 0.8%
Connecticut 3	Charles A. Russell	Republican	1886	Incumbent re-elected.	▌ ✓ Charles A. Russell (Republican) 64.0%; ▌Joseph T. Fanning (Democratic) 32.1%; ▌Henry L. Hammond (Nat. Democratic) 2.1%; ▌William Ingalls (Prohibition) 1.7%
Connecticut 4	Ebenezer J. Hill	Republican	1894	Incumbent re-elected.	▌ ✓ Ebenezer J. Hill (Republican) 63.3%; ▌Michael J. Houlihan (Democratic) 32.5%; ▌Morris W. Seymour (Nat. Democratic) 2.9%; ▌Frederick L. Wooster (Prohibition) 0.9%

== Delaware ==
District	Incumbent			This race	
District	Member	Party	First elected	Results	Candidates
Delaware at-large	Jonathan S. Willis	Republican	1894	Incumbent lost re-election. Democratic gain.	▌ ✓ L. Irving Handy (Democratic) 44.0%; ▌ Jonathan S. Willis (Union Republican) 31.8%; ▌ Robert G. Houston (Republican) 20.3%; ▌ Thomas F. Bayard Jr. (National Democratic) 2.6%; ▌ William Faries (Prohibition) 1.3%

== Florida ==
District	Incumbent			This race	
District	Member	Party	First elected	Results	Candidates
Florida 1	Stephen M. Sparkman	Democratic	1894	Incumbent re-elected.	▌ ✓ Stephen M. Sparkman (Democratic) 77.5%; ▌E. K. Nichols (Republican) 14.6%; ▌J. Asakiah Williams (Populist) 6.8%; ▌J. C. Green (Prohibition) 1.1%
Florida 2	Charles Merian Cooper	Democratic	1892	Incumbent retired. Democratic hold.	▌ ✓ Robert Wyche Davis (Democratic) 61.9%; ▌Joseph N. Stripling (Republican) 28.6%; ▌Daniel G. Ambler (National Democratic) 5.0%; ▌William R. Peterson (Populist) 3.7%; ▌M. E. Spencer (Prohibition) 0.8%

== Georgia ==
District	Incumbent			This race	
District	Member	Party	First elected	Results	Candidates
Georgia 1	Rufus E. Lester	Democratic	1888	Incumbent re-elected.	▌ ✓ Rufus E. Lester (Democratic) 53.8%; ▌ Joseph F. Doyle (Republican) 27.3%; ▌ George H. Miller (Populist) 18.9%
Georgia 2	Benjamin E. Russell	Democratic	1892	Incumbent retired. Democratic hold.	▌ ✓ James M. Griggs (Democratic) 53.2%; ▌ J. E. Peterson (Republican) 28.3%; ▌ John A. Sibley (Populist) 18.6%
Georgia 3	Charles R. Crisp	Democratic	1896	Incumbent retired. Democratic hold.	▌ ✓ Elijah B. Lewis (Democratic) 70.7%; ▌ Seaborn S. Montgomery (Populist) 29.3%
Georgia 4	Charles L. Moses	Democratic	1890	Incumbent lost renomination. Democratic hold.	▌ ✓ William C. Adamson (Democratic) 65.2%; ▌ A. H. Freeman (Republican) 32.9%
Georgia 5	Leonidas F. Livingston	Democratic	1890	Incumbent re-elected.	▌ ✓ Leonidas F. Livingston (Democratic) 58.0%; ▌ J. C. Hendrix (Republican) 42.0%
Georgia 6	Charles L. Bartlett	Democratic	1894	Incumbent re-elected.	▌ ✓ Charles L. Bartlett (Democratic) 63.7%; ▌ A. A. Murphy (Populist) 36.3%
Georgia 7	John W. Maddox	Democratic	1892	Incumbent re-elected.	▌ ✓ John W. Maddox (Democratic) 53.4%; ▌ W. L. Massey (Republican) 25.4%; ▌ J. W. McGarrity (Populist) 21.2%
Georgia 8	Thomas G. Lawson	Democratic	1890	Incumbent lost renomination. Democratic hold.	▌ ✓ William M. Howard (Democratic) 61.6%; ▌ G. L. Anderson (Populist) 20.1%; ▌ W. Patrick Henry (Republican) 18.3%
Georgia 9	Farish Tate	Democratic	1892	Incumbent re-elected.	▌ ✓ Farish Tate (Democratic) 54.2%; ▌ H. P. Farrow (Republican) 26.6%; ▌ Thomas C. Winn (Populist) 19.3%
Georgia 10	James C. C. Black	Democratic	1892	Incumbent retired. Democratic hold.	▌ ✓ William H. Fleming (Democratic) 58.8%; ▌ John T. West (Populist) 41.3%
Georgia 11	Henry G. Turner	Democratic	1880	Incumbent retired. Democratic hold.	▌ ✓ William G. Brantley (Democratic) 60.3%; ▌ Benjamin Millikan (Populist) 39.7%

== Idaho ==
District	Incumbent			This race	
District	Member	Party	First elected	Results	Candidates
Idaho at-large	Edgar Wilson	Republican	1894	Incumbent retired to run for Idaho Supreme Court. Populist gain.	▌ ✓ James Gunn (Populist/Democratic) 47.75%; ▌William Borah (Silver Republican) 31.29%; ▌John T. Morrison (Republican) 20.97%

== Illinois ==
District	Incumbent			This race	
District	Member	Party	First elected	Results	Candidates
Illinois 1	J. Frank Aldrich	Republican	1892	Incumbent retired. Republican hold.	▌ ✓ James Robert Mann (Republican) 67.6%; ▌ James H. Teller (Democratic/Populist) 30.3%; ▌ Benjamin J. Wertheimer (National Democratic) 1.3%; ▌ Thomas A. Strobridge (Prohibition) 0.8%
Illinois 2	William Lorimer	Republican	1894	Incumbent re-elected.	▌ ✓ William Lorimer (Republican) 54.3%; ▌ John Z. White (Democratic/Populist) 43.9%; ▌ James Craigmile (Prohibition) 0.9%; ▌ [FNU] Crenshaw (National Democratic) 0.9%
Illinois 3	Hugh R. Belknap	Republican	1894	Incumbent re-elected.	▌ ✓ Hugh R. Belknap (Republican) 50.0%; ▌ Clarence Darrow (Democratic/Populist) 48.7%; ▌ John Krebs (National Democratic) 0.6%; ▌ Solomon D. Ebersoll (Prohibition) 0.4%; ▌ Michael L. Morris (Socialist Labor) 0.2%; ▌ John J. Flanning (Middle of the Road Populist) 0.1%
Illinois 4	Charles W. Woodman	Republican	1894	Incumbent lost renomination. Republican hold.	▌ ✓ Daniel W. Mills (Republican) 50.9%; ▌ James McAndrews (Democratic/Populist) 46.5%; ▌ James E. Gillis (National Democratic) 1.0%; ▌ Charles W. Woodman (Independent Republican) 0.8%; ▌ Archibald Sprott (Prohibition) 0.5%; ▌ J. Augustus Weaver (Socialist Labor) 0.3%
Illinois 5	George E. White	Republican	1894	Incumbent re-elected.	▌ ✓ George E. White (Republican) 50.9%; ▌ Edward Thomas Noonan (Democratic/Populist) 44.1%; ▌ [FNU] McDonnell (Independent) 3.6%; ▌ Thomas L. Haines (Prohibition) 0.6%; ▌ [FNU] Courtney (National Democratic) 0.5%
Illinois 6	Edward D. Cooke	Republican	1894	Incumbent re-elected.	▌ ✓ Edward D. Cooke (Republican) 56.3%; ▌ Joseph L. Martin (Democratic/Populist) 41.9%; ▌ Sigmund Zeisler (National Democratic) 1.2%; ▌ Ira J. Mason (Prohibition) 0.6%
Illinois 7	George E. Foss	Republican	1894	Incumbent re-elected	▌ ✓ George E. Foss (Republican) 65.1%; ▌ Olaf E. Ray (Democratic) 33.3%; ▌ M. W. Robinson (National Democratic) 0.8%; ▌ James C. Ambrose (Prohibition) 0.7%
Illinois 8	Albert J. Hopkins	Republican	1885	Incumbent re-elected	▌ ✓ Albert J. Hopkins (Republican) 70.1%; ▌ Simeon N. Hoover (Democratic) 28.1%; ▌ S. N. Hoover (Prohibition) 1.8%
Illinois 9	Robert R. Hitt	Republican	1882	Incumbent re-elected.	▌ ✓ Robert R. Hitt (Republican) 67.2%; ▌ Charles O. Knudson (Democratic) 31.1%; ▌ James Lamont (Prohibition) 1.7%
Illinois 10	George W. Prince	Republican	1895	Incumbent re-elected.	▌ ✓ George W. Prince (Republican) 64.0%; ▌ William R. Moore (Democratic) 32.0%; ▌ William C. Holden (Populist) 2.9%; ▌ William Goldsworthy (Prohibition) 1.1%
Illinois 11	Walter Reeves	Republican	1894	Incumbent re-elected.	▌ ✓ Walter Reeves (Republican) 56.5%; ▌ Charles M. Golden (Democratic) 42.2%; ▌ John W. Hosier (Prohibition) 1.3%
Illinois 12	Joseph Gurney Cannon	Republican	1892	Incumbent re-elected.	▌ ✓ Joseph Gurney Cannon (Republican) 59.9%; ▌ George L. Vance (Democratic/Populist) 39.1%; ▌ J. J. Hales (Prohibition) 1.0%
Illinois 13	Vespasian Warner	Republican	1894	Incumbent re-elected.	▌ ✓ Vespasian Warner (Republican) 58.2%; ▌ Frank M. Palmer (Democratic/Populist) 40.1%; ▌ Thomas J. Scott (Prohibition) 1.7%
Illinois 14	Joseph V. Graff	Republican	1894	Incumbent re-elected.	▌ ✓ Joseph V. Graff (Republican) 50.9%; ▌ Nicholas E. Worthington (Democratic) 47.4%; ▌ Daniel R. Sheen (Prohibition) 0.9%; ▌ Theodore Holly (Populist) 0.8%
Illinois 15	Benjamin F. Marsh	Republican	1876	Incumbent re-elected.	▌ ✓ Benjamin F. Marsh (Republican) 49.7%; ▌ William H. Neece (Democratic) 49.1%; ▌ E. Lawrence Gross (Prohibition) 1.2%
Illinois 16	John I. Rinaker	Republican	1894	Incumbent lost re-election. Democratic gain.	▌ ✓ William H. Hinrichsen (Democratic/Populist) 56.0%; ▌ John I. Rinaker (Republican) 43.1%; ▌ M. M. Cooper (Prohibition) 0.9%
Illinois 17	James A. Connolly	Republican	1894	Incumbent re-elected.	▌ ✓ James A. Connolly (Republican) 49.4%; ▌ Ben F. Caldwell (Democratic) 49.2%; ▌ Edmund Miller (Prohibition) 1.0%; ▌ E. G. King (National Democratic) 0.4%
Illinois 18	William F. L. Hadley	Republican	1895	Incumbent lost re-election. Democratic gain.	▌ ✓ Thomas M. Jett (Democratic) 51.5%; ▌ William F. L. Hadley (Republican) 47.4%; ▌ Frank H. Ashcraft (Prohibition) 1.1%
Illinois 19	Benson Wood	Republican	1894	Incumbent lost re-election. Democratic gain.	▌ ✓ Andrew J. Hunter (Democratic) 50.0%; ▌ Benson Wood (Republican) 47.6%; ▌ J. J. Sewell (Populist) 1.7%; ▌ Caius C. Griffith (Prohibition) 0.7%
Illinois 20	Orlando Burrell	Republican	1894	Incumbent lost re-election. Democratic gain.	▌ ✓ James R. Williams (Democratic/Populist) 53.3%; ▌ Orlando Burrell (Republican) 46.5%; ▌ Thomas Riley (Prohibition) 0.2%
Illinois 21	Everett J. Murphy	Republican	1894	Incumbent lost re-election. Democratic gain.	▌ ✓ Jehu Baker (Democratic) 50.4%; ▌ Everett J. Murphy (Republican) 49.6%
Illinois 22	George Washington Smith	Republican	1888	Incumbent re-elected.	▌ ✓ George Washington Smith (Republican) 55.3%; ▌ J. J. Hall (Democratic/Populist) 44.7%

== Indiana ==
District	Incumbent			This race	
District	Member	Party	First elected	Results	Candidates
Indiana 1	James A. Hemenway	Republican	1894	Incumbent re-elected.	▌ ✓ James A. Hemenway (Republican) 49.6%; ▌ Thomas Duncan (Democratic) 47.4%; ▌ Josephus Lee (Populist) 3.0%
Indiana 2	Alexander M. Hardy	Republican	1894	Incumbent lost re-election. Democratic gain.	▌ ✓ Robert W. Miers (Democratic) 48.2%; ▌ Alexander M. Hardy (Republican) 46.0%; ▌ Newel H. Motsinger (Populist) 5.8%
Indiana 3	Robert J. Tracewell	Republican	1894	Incumbent lost re-election. Democratic gain.	▌ ✓ William T. Zenor (Democratic) 52.6%; ▌ Robert J. Tracewell (Republican) 46.9%; ▌ George R. Winchell (Prohibition) 0.3%
Indiana 4	James E. Watson	Republican	1894	Incumbent retired. Democratic gain.	▌ ✓ William S. Holman (Democratic) 50.8%; ▌ Marcus R. Sulzer (Republican) 49.0%; ▌ Nicholas Smith (Prohibition) 0.2%
Indiana 5	George W. Faris; Redistricted from the 8th district	Republican	1894	Incumbent re-elected.	▌ ✓ George W. Faris (Republican) 50.4%; ▌ John Clark Ridpath (Democratic/Populist) 49.6%
Indiana 6	Henry U. Johnson	Republican	1890	Incumbent re-elected.	▌ ✓ Henry U. Johnson (Republican) 52.4%; ▌ Charles A. Robinson (Democratic/Populist) 47.6%
Indiana 7	Jesse Overstreet; Redistricted from the 5th district	Republican	1894	Incumbent re-elected.	▌ ✓ Jesse Overstreet (Republican) 53.8%; ▌ Charles M. Cooper (Democratic/Populist) 44.8%; ▌ Evans Woollen (National Democratic) 1.4%
Indiana 8	Charles L. Henry; Redistricted from the 7th district	Republican	1894	Incumbent re-elected.	▌ ✓ Charles L. Henry (Republican) 52.3%; ▌ John R. Brunt (Democratic/Populist) 47.7%
Indiana 9	Frank Hanly	Republican	1894	Incumbent lost renomination. Republican hold.	▌ ✓ Charles B. Landis (Republican) 50.3%; ▌ Joseph B. Cheadle (Democratic/Populist) 49.7%
Indiana 10	Jethro A. Hatch	Republican	1894	Incumbent retired. Republican hold.	▌ ✓ Edgar D. Crumpacker (Republican) 55.0%; ▌ Martin L. Kruger (Democratic/Populist) 45.0%
Indiana 11	George Washington Steele	Republican	1894	Incumbent re-elected.	▌ ✓ George Washington Steele (Republican) 53.6%; ▌ Joseph Larmier (Democratic) 44.5%; ▌ Harvey Ratliff (Prohibition) 1.2%; ▌ [FNU] Larimer (Populist) 0.7%
Indiana 12	Jacob D. Leighty	Republican	1894	Incumbent lost re-election. Democratic gain.	▌ ✓ James M. Robinson (Democratic/Populist) 50.6%; ▌ Jacob D. Leighty (Republican) 49.4%
Indiana 13	Lemuel W. Royse	Republican	1894	Incumbent re-elected.	▌ ✓ Lemuel W. Royse (Republican) 51.6%; ▌ Charles Kellison (Democratic/Populist) 48.4%

== Iowa ==
District	Incumbent			This race	
District	Member	Party	First elected	Results	Candidates
Iowa 1	Samuel M. Clark	Republican	1894	Incumbent re-elected.	▌ ✓ Samuel M. Clark (Republican) 53.7%; ▌ Sabut M. Casey (Democratic/Populist) 45.6%; ▌ Alva H. Hewitt (Prohibition) 0.7%
Iowa 2	George M. Curtis	Republican	1894	Incumbent re-elected.	▌ ✓ George M. Curtis (Republican) 52.8%; ▌ Alfred Hurst (Democratic) 45.2%; ▌ Charles A. Lloyd (Populist) 1.5%; ▌ N. J. Kremer (Socialist Labor) 0.5%
Iowa 3	David B. Henderson	Republican	1882	Incumbent re-elected.	▌ ✓ David B. Henderson (Republican) 60.7%; ▌ George Stachl (Democratic) 39.3%
Iowa 4	Thomas Updegraff	Republican	1892	Incumbent re-elected.	▌ ✓ Thomas Updegraff (Republican) 59.6%; ▌ F. D. Bayless (Democratic/Populist) 39.8%; ▌ Charles G. Patten (Prohibition) 0.6%
Iowa 5	Robert G. Cousins	Republican	1892	Incumbent re-elected.	▌ ✓ Robert G. Cousins (Republican) 57.7%; ▌ John R. Caldwell (Democratic/Populist) 41.5%; ▌ Laurie Tatum (Prohibition) 0.8%
Iowa 6	John F. Lacey	Republican	1892	Incumbent re-elected.	▌ ✓ John F. Lacey (Republican) 51.1%; ▌ F. E. White (Democratic/Populist) 48.3%; ▌ Abner Branson (Prohibition) 0.6%
Iowa 7	John A. T. Hull	Republican	1890	Incumbent re-elected.	▌ ✓ John A. T. Hull (Republican) 56.9%; ▌ Frank W. Evans (Democratic/Populist) 43.1%
Iowa 8	William P. Hepburn	Republican	1892	Incumbent re-elected.	▌ ✓ William P. Hepburn (Republican) 50.9%; ▌ W. H. Robb (Democratic/Populist) 49.2%
Iowa 9	Alva L. Hager	Republican	1892	Incumbent re-elected.	▌ ✓ Alva L. Hager (Republican) 52.4%; ▌ L. T. Genning (Democratic/Populist) 47.4%; ▌ T. D. Thomas (Prohibition) 0.2%
Iowa 10	Jonathan P. Dolliver	Republican	1888	Incumbent re-elected.	▌ ✓ Jonathan P. Dolliver (Republican) 59.4%; ▌ John B. Romans (Democratic/Populist) 40.0%; ▌ M. W. Atwood (Prohibition) 0.6%
Iowa 11	George D. Perkins	Republican	1890	Incumbent re-elected.	▌ ✓ George D. Perkins (Republican) 56.1%; ▌ H. Vanwagener (Democratic/Populist) 43.2%; ▌ C. F. Farrand (Prohibition) 0.7%

== Kansas ==
District	Incumbent			This race	
District	Member	Party	First elected	Results	Candidates
Kansas 1	Case Broderick	Republican	1890	Incumbent re-elected.	▌ ✓ Case Broderick (Republican) 53.1%; ▌ H. E. Ballou (Populist/Democratic) 46.9%
Kansas 2	Orrin L. Miller	Republican	1894	Incumbent retired. Populist gain.	▌ ✓ Mason S. Peters (Populist/Democratic) 50.4%; ▌ John P. Harris (Republican) 49.6%
Kansas 3	Snyder S. Kirkpatrick	Republican	1894	Incumbent lost re-election. Populist gain.	▌ ✓ Edwin R. Ridgely (Populist/Democratic) 54.2%; ▌ Snyder S. Kirkpatrick (Republican) 45.8%
Kansas 4	Charles Curtis	Republican	1892	Incumbent re-elected.	▌ ✓ Charles Curtis (Republican) 50.7%; ▌ John Madden (Populist/Democratic) 49.3%
Kansas 5	William A. Calderhead	Republican	1894	Incumbent lost re-election. Populist gain.	▌ ✓ William D. Vincent (Populist/Democratic) 50.8%; ▌ William A. Calderhead (Republican) 49.2%
Kansas 6	William Baker	Populist	1890	Incumbent retired. Populist hold.	▌ ✓ Nelson B. McCormick (Populist) 50.8%; ▌ A. H. Ellis (Republican) 44.9%; ▌ J. C. Burton (Democratic) 4.3%
Kansas 7	Chester I. Long	Republican	1894	Incumbent lost re-election. Populist gain.	▌ ✓ Jerry Simpson (Populist/Democratic) 52.5%; ▌ Chester I. Long (Republican) 47.5%
Kansas at-large	Richard W. Blue	Republican	1894	Incumbent lost re-election. Populist gain.	▌ ✓ Jeremiah D. Botkin (Populist/Democratic) 51.3%; ▌ Richard W. Blue (Republican) 48.2%; ▌ [FNU] Williams (Prohibition) 0.5%

== Kentucky ==
District	Incumbent			This race	
District	Member	Party	First elected	Results	Candidates
Kentucky 1	John K. Hendrick	Democratic	1894	Incumbent lost renomination. Democratic hold.	▌ ✓ Charles K. Wheeler (Democratic) 37.4%; ▌ George P. Thomas (Republican) 32.4%; ▌ Ben C. Keys (Populist) 30.3%
Kentucky 2	John D. Clardy	Democratic	1894	Incumbent re-elected.	▌ ✓ John D. Clardy (Democratic) 57.0%; ▌ Edward T. Franks (Republican) 41.8%; ▌ J. W. Lockett (National Democratic) 1.0%; ▌ Walter Southall (Populist) 0.2%
Kentucky 3	W. Godfrey Hunter	Republican	1894	Incumbent lost re-election. Democratic gain.	▌ ✓ John S. Rhea (Democratic) 49.6%; ▌ W. Godfrey Hunter (Republican) 48.7%; ▌ W. R. Vaughn (Independent) 1.7%
Kentucky 4	John W. Lewis	Republican	1894	Incumbent lost re-election. Democratic gain.	▌ ✓ David Highbaugh Smith (Democratic) 49.1%; ▌ John W. Lewis (Republican) 45.8%; ▌ J. E. Durham (Populist) 4.4%; ▌ W. N. Likens (Prohibition) 0.7%
Kentucky 5	Walter Evans	Republican	1894	Incumbent re-elected.	▌ ✓ Walter Evans (Republican) 59.7%; ▌ John Y. Brown (Democratic) 36.8%; ▌ John B. Baskin (National Democratic) 3.5%
Kentucky 6	Albert S. Berry	Democratic	1892	Incumbent re-elected.	▌ ✓ Albert S. Berry (Democratic) 58.9%; ▌ Richard P. Ernst (Republican) 41.1%
Kentucky 7	William Claiborne Owens	Democratic	1894	Incumbent retired. Democratic hold.	▌ ✓ Evan E. Settle (Democratic) 52.5%; ▌ W. C. P. Breckinridge (Nat. Democratic/Republican) 47.5%
Kentucky 8	James B. McCreary	Democratic	1884	Incumbent lost renomination. Republican gain.	▌ ✓ George M. Davison (Republican) 53.7%; ▌ John B. Thompson (Democratic) 46.3%
Kentucky 9	Samuel J. Pugh	Republican	1894	Incumbent re-elected.	▌ ✓ Samuel J. Pugh (Republican) 50.5%; ▌ W. Larue Thomas (Democratic) 49.5%
Kentucky 10	Nathan T. Hopkins	Republican	1894	Incumbent retired. Democratic gain.	▌ ✓ Thomas Y. Fitzpatrick (Democratic) 51.9%; ▌ John W. Langley (Republican) 48.1%
Kentucky 11	David G. Colson	Republican	1894	Incumbent re-elected.	▌ ✓ David G. Colson (Republican) 56.2%; ▌ James D. Black (Democratic) 32.3%; ▌ J. D. White (Independent) 11.4%

== Louisiana ==
District	Incumbent			This race	
District	Member	Party	First elected	Results	Candidates
Louisiana 1	Adolph Meyer	Democratic	1890	Incumbent re-elected.	▌ ✓ Adolph Meyer (Democratic) 70.5%; ▌ Armand Romain (National Republican) 26.1%; ▌ A. E. Livaudais (Republican) 2.7%; ▌ Joseph Gazin (Labor) 0.7%
Louisiana 2	Charles F. Buck	Democratic	1894	Incumbent retired to run for Mayor of New Orleans. Democratic hold.	▌ ✓ Robert C. Davey (Democratic) 60.8%; ▌ James Legendre (National Republican) 31.0%; ▌ Frank N. Wicker (Republican) 8.0%
Louisiana 3	Andrew Price	Democratic	1889	Incumbent retired. Democratic hold.	▌ ✓ Robert F. Broussard (Democratic) 57.7%; ▌ Taylor Beattie (National Republican) 40.2%; ▌ W. D. Gooch (Populist) 1.1%; ▌ H. O. Mayer (Republican) 1.0%
Louisiana 4	Henry Warren Ogden	Democratic	1894	Incumbent re-elected.	▌ ✓ Henry Warren Ogden (Democratic) 66.7%; ▌ B. W. Bailey (Populist) 29.3%; ▌ Robert P. Hunter (Republican) 4.0%
Louisiana 5	Charles J. Boatner	Democratic	1888	Incumbent retired. Democratic hold.	▌ ✓ Samuel T. Baird (Democratic) 70.2%; ▌ Alexis Benoit (Populist) 29.8%
Louisiana 6	Samuel M. Robertson	Democratic	1887	Incumbent re-elected.	▌ ✓ Samuel M. Robertson (Democratic) 72.0%; ▌ C. C. Dunson (National Republican) 22.4%; ▌ William M. Thompson (Populist) 5.6%

== Maine ==
District	Incumbent			This race	
District	Member	Party	First elected	Results	Candidates
Maine 1	Thomas Brackett Reed	Republican	1876	Incumbent re-elected.	▌ ✓ Thomas Brackett Reed (Republican) 66.90%; ▌Edward W. Staples (Democratic) 30.42%; ▌Aaron Clark (Prohibition) 2.09%; ▌James E. Campion (Populist) 0.59%
Maine 2	Nelson Dingley Jr.	Republican	1880	Incumbent re-elected.	▌ ✓ Nelson Dingley Jr. (Republican) 69.21%; ▌Arwood Levensaler (Democratic) 26.01%; ▌Charles E. Allen (Populist) 3.38%; ▌Edward W. Ogier (Prohibition) 1.41%
Maine 3	Seth L. Milliken	Republican	1882	Incumbent re-elected.	▌ ✓ Seth L. Milliken (Republican) 68.20%; ▌Melvin S. Holway (Democratic) 26.18%; ▌Bradford F. Lancaster (Populist) 3.82%; ▌William S. Thompson (Prohibition) 1.80%
Maine 4	Charles A. Boutelle	Republican	1882	Incumbent re-elected.	▌ ✓ Charles A. Boutelle (Republican) 65.96%; ▌Andrew J. Chase (Democratic) 28.39%; ▌George M. Park (Prohibition) 2.89%; ▌Oliver D. Chapman (Populist) 2.76%

== Maryland ==
District	Incumbent			This race	
District	Member	Party	First elected	Results	Candidates
Maryland 1	Joshua W. Miles	Democratic	1894	Incumbent lost re-election. Republican gain.	▌ ✓ Isaac A. Barber (Republican) 48.5; ▌ Joshua W. Miles (Democratic) 46.9%; ▌ T. Pliny Fisher (Prohibition) 4.6%
Maryland 2	William Benjamin Baker	Republican	1894	Incumbent re-elected.	▌ ✓ William Benjamin Baker (Republican) 53.6%; ▌ George Jewett (Democratic) 43.5%; ▌ Chester B. Turnbull (Prohibition) 2.9%
Maryland 3	Harry W. Rusk	Democratic	1886	Incumbent retired. Republican gain.	▌ ✓ William S. Booze (Republican) 57.2%; ▌ Thomas C. Weeks (Democratic) 40.3%; ▌ William Toner (Socialist Labor) 1.3%; ▌ Henry L. Hillegeist (Prohibition) 1.2%
Maryland 4	John K. Cowen	Democratic	1894	Incumbent retired. Republican gain.	▌ ✓ William W. McIntire (Republican) 59.3%; ▌ William Ogden (Democratic) 39.1%; ▌ Arthur Frey (Prohibition) 1.6%
Maryland 5	Charles E. Coffin	Republican	1894	Incumbent retired. Republican hold.	▌ ✓ Sydney E. Mudd I (Republican) 54.3%; ▌ Robert Mass (Democratic) 44.3%; ▌ S. R. Neave (Prohibition) 1.4%
Maryland 6	George Louis Wellington	Republican	1894	Incumbent retired after election as a U.S. senator. Republican hold.	▌ ✓ John McDonald (Republican) 53.3%; ▌ Blair Lee I (Democratic) 44.8%; ▌ Samuel H. Hockman (Prohibition) 1.9%

== Massachusetts ==
District	Incumbent			This race	
District	Member	Party	First elected	Results	Candidates
Massachusetts 1	Ashley B. Wright	Republican	1892	Incumbent re-elected.	▌ ✓ Ashley B. Wright (Republican) 55.2%; ▌Patrick H. Sheehan (Democratic) 31.0%; ▌John Bascom (Prohibition) 3.6%
Massachusetts 2	Frederick H. Gillett	Republican	1892	Incumbent re-elected.	▌ ✓ Frederick H. Gillett (Republican) 71.8%; ▌Thomas A. Fitzgibbon (Democratic) 28.2%
Massachusetts 3	Joseph H. Walker	Republican	1888	Incumbent re-elected.	▌ ✓ Joseph H. Walker (Republican) 72.6%; ▌John O'Gara (Democratic) 27.4%
Massachusetts 4	Lewis D. Apsley	Republican	1892	Incumbent retired. Republican hold.	▌ ✓ George W. Weymouth (Republican) 69.4%; ▌L. Porter Morse (Democratic) 30.6%
Massachusetts 5	William S. Knox	Republican	1894	Incumbent re-elected.	▌ ✓ William S. Knox (Republican) 60.7%; ▌John H. Harrington (Democratic) 39.3%
Massachusetts 6	William H. Moody	Republican	1895 (special)	Incumbent re-elected.	▌ ✓ William H. Moody (Republican) 72.8%; ▌Eben M. Boynton (Democratic) 27.2%
Massachusetts 7	William Emerson Barrett	Republican	1894	Incumbent re-elected.	▌ ✓ William Emerson Barrett (Republican) 68.2%; ▌Philip J. Doherty (Democratic) 31.8%
Massachusetts 8	Samuel W. McCall	Republican	1892	Incumbent re-elected.	▌ ✓ Samuel W. McCall (Republican) 74.4%; ▌Frederick H. Jackson (Democratic) 25.6%
Massachusetts 9	John F. Fitzgerald	Democratic	1894	Incumbent re-elected.	▌ ✓ John F. Fitzgerald (Democratic) 54.7%; ▌Walter L. Sears (Republican) 30.6%; ▌John A. Ryan (Silver Democratic) 12.7%; ▌Hammond T. Fletcher (Ind. Republican) 2.0%
Massachusetts 10	Harrison H. Atwood	Republican	1894	Incumbent lost renomination. Republican hold.	▌ ✓ Samuel J. Barrows (Republican) 50.4%; ▌Bordman Hall (Democratic) 41.9%; ▌William L. Chase (Citizen's Republican) 7.7%
Massachusetts 11	William F. Draper	Republican	1892	Incumbent retired. Republican hold.	▌ ✓ Charles F. Sprague (Republican) 69.4%; ▌William H. Baker (Democratic) 30.6%
Massachusetts 12	Elijah A. Morse	Republican	1888	Incumbent retired. Republican hold.	▌ ✓ William C. Lovering (Republican) 76.9%; ▌E. Gerry Brown (Democratic) 23.1%
Massachusetts 13	John Simpkins	Republican	1894	Incumbent re-elected.	▌ ✓ John Simpkins (Republican) 74.7%; ▌James F. Morris (Democratic) 25.3%

== Michigan ==
District	Incumbent			This race	
District	Member	Party	First elected	Results	Candidates
Michigan 1	John Blaisdell Corliss	Republican	1894	Incumbent re-elected.	▌ ✓ John Blaisdell Corliss (Republican) 55.5%; ▌ Edwin Henderson (Fusion Democratic) 44.5%
Michigan 2	George Spalding	Republican	1894	Incumbent re-elected.	▌ ✓ George Spalding (Republican) 50.5%; ▌ Thomas E. Barkworth (Fusion Democratic) 47.7%; ▌ Oliver H. Perry (Prohibition) 1.1%; ▌ William Rawson (Independent) 0.4%; ▌ John O. Zabell (Populist) 0.3%
Michigan 3	Alfred Milnes	Republican	1895	Incumbent lost re-election. Democratic gain.	▌ ✓ Albert M. Todd (Fusion Democratic) 49.4%; ▌ Alfred Milnes (Republican) 48.5%; ▌ John M. Corbin (National Democratic) 1.2%; ▌ Ashman A. Knappen (Prohibition) 0.9%
Michigan 4	Henry F. Thomas	Republican	1892	Incumbent lost renomination. Republican hold.	▌ ✓ Edward L. Hamilton (Republican) 53.6%; ▌ Roman I. Jarvis (Fusion Democratic) 46.4%
Michigan 5	William Alden Smith	Republican	1894	Incumbent re-elected.	▌ ✓ William Alden Smith (Republican) 54.8%; ▌ George P. Hummer (Fusion Democratic) 45.2%
Michigan 6	David D. Aitken	Republican	1892	Incumbent retired to run for Governor of Michigan. Republican hold.	▌ ✓ Samuel W. Smith (Republican) 53.4%; ▌ Quincy A. Smith (Fusion Democratic) 46.6%
Michigan 7	Horace G. Snover	Republican	1894	Incumbent re-elected.	▌ ✓ Horace G. Snover (Republican) 55.5%; ▌ O'Brien J. Atkinson (Fusion Democratic) 44.5%
Michigan 8	William S. Linton	Republican	1892	Incumbent lost re-election. Democratic gain.	▌ ✓ Ferdinand Brucker (Fusion Democratic) 51.0%; ▌ William S. Linton (Republican) 49.0%
Michigan 9	Roswell P. Bishop	Republican	1894	Incumbent re-elected.	▌ ✓ Roswell P. Bishop (Republican) 58.3%; ▌ Armond F. Tibbitts (Fusion Democratic) 40.6%; ▌ J. G. Rogers (Prohibition) 1.1%
Michigan 10	Rousseau O. Crump	Republican	1894	Incumbent re-elected.	▌ ✓ Rousseau O. Crump (Republican) 52.7%; ▌ Charles S. Hampton (Fusion Democratic) 47.3%
Michigan 11	John Avery	Republican	1892	Incumbent retired. Republican hold.	▌ ✓ William S. Mesick (Republican) 54.9%; ▌ Jonathan G. Ramsdell (Fusion Democratic) 44.1%; ▌ Joseph B. Barney (Prohibition) 1.0%
Michigan 12	Samuel M. Stephenson	Republican	1888	Incumbent retired. Republican hold.	▌ ✓ Carlos D. Shelden (Republican) 70.3%; ▌ Henry W. Seymour (Fusion Democratic) 29.7%

== Minnesota ==
District	Incumbent			This race	
District	Member	Party	First elected	Results	Candidates
Minnesota 1	James A. Tawney	Republican	1892	Incumbent re-elected.	▌ ✓ James A. Tawney (Republican) 60.7%; ▌Patrick Fitzpatrick (Democratic/Populist) 37.4%; ▌Herman D. Clark (Prohibition) 1.8%
Minnesota 2	James McCleary	Republican	1892	Incumbent re-elected.	▌ ✓ James McCleary (Republican) 57.1%; ▌Frank A. Day (Democratic/Populist) 40.9%; ▌Richard Price (Prohibition) 2.0%
Minnesota 3	Joel Heatwole	Republican	1894	Incumbent re-elected.	▌ ✓ Joel Heatwole (Republican) 55.9%; ▌Harrison J. Peck (Democratic/Populist) 42.3%; ▌Christian T. Laugeson (Prohibition) 1.8%
Minnesota 4	Andrew Kiefer	Republican	1892	Incumbent retired. Republican hold.	▌ ✓ Frederick Stevens (Republican) 62.2%; ▌Francis H. Clark (Democratic/Populist) 36.7%; ▌George S. Innis (Prohibition) 1.1%
Minnesota 5	Loren Fletcher	Republican	1892	Incumbent re-elected.	▌ ✓ Loren Fletcher (Republican) 51.8%; ▌Sidney M. Owen (Democratic/Populist) 45.5%; ▌James A. Sanborn (Prohibition) 1.6%; ▌Herbert T. Shaw (Socialist Labor) 1.1%
Minnesota 6	Charles A. Towne	Republican	1894	Incumbent lost re-election as a Fusion candidate. Republican hold.	▌ ✓ Page Morris (Republican) 50.6%; ▌Charles A. Towne (Democratic/Populist) 49.4%
Minnesota 7	Frank Eddy	Republican	1894	Incumbent re-elected.	▌ ✓ Frank Eddy (Republican) 50.9%; ▌Edwin E. Lommen (Democratic/Populist) 46.8%; ▌Jorgen F. Heiberg (Prohibition) 2.3%

== Mississippi ==
District	Incumbent			This race	
District	Member	Party	First elected	Results	Candidates
Mississippi 1	John M. Allen	Democratic	1884	Incumbent re-elected.	▌ ✓ John M. Allen (Democratic) 86.92%; ▌A. W. Kearley (Populist) 9.05%; ▌William H. McGill (Republican) 4.03%
Mississippi 2	John C. Kyle	Democratic	1890	Incumbent retired. Democratic hold.	▌ ✓ William V. Sullivan (Democratic) 70.23%; ▌F. E. Ray (Populist) 14.89%; ▌W. D. Miller (National Democratic) 7.88%; ▌M. A. Montgomery (Republican) 7.00%
Mississippi 3	Thomas C. Catchings	Democratic	1884	Incumbent re-elected.	▌ ✓ Thomas C. Catchings (Democratic) 75.68%; ▌James R. Chalmers (Free Silver Republican) 13.12%; ▌C. J. Jones (Hill Republican) 9.10%; ▌T. S. Easterling (Lynch Republican) 2.10%
Mississippi 4	Hernando Money	Democratic	1892	Incumbent retired. Democratic hold.	▌ ✓ Andrew F. Fox (Democratic) 69.89%; ▌R. K. Prewitt (Populist) 25.85%; ▌W. D. Frazee (Hill Republican) 2.91%; ▌S. S. Matthews (Lynch Republican) 1.35%
Mississippi 5	John S. Williams	Democratic	1892	Incumbent re-elected.	▌ ✓ John S. Williams (Democratic) 80.10%; ▌W. H. Stinson (Populist) 17.19%; ▌J. E. Everett (Lynch Republican) 1.62%; ▌J. H. Denson (Hill Republican) 1.09%
Mississippi 6	Walter M. Denny	Democratic	1894	Incumbent lost renomination. Democratic hold.	▌ ✓ William F. Love (Democratic) 64.25%; ▌A. C. Hathorn (Populist) 25.66%; ▌H. C. Griffin (Republican) 10.09%
Mississippi 7	James G. Spencer	Democratic	1894	Incumbent retired. Democratic hold.	▌ ✓ Patrick Henry (Democratic) 84.74%; ▌G. M. Cain (Populist) 10.37%; ▌J. M. Matthews (Lynch Republican) 2.67%; ▌S. A. Beadle (Hill Republican) 2.22%

== Missouri ==
District	Incumbent			This race	
District	Member	Party	First elected	Results	Candidates
Missouri 1	Charles N. Clark	Republican	1894	Incumbent lost re-election. Democratic gain.	▌ ✓ Richard P. Giles (Democratic) 53.3%; ▌ Charles N. Clark (Republican) 42.8%; ▌ Joseph Miller (Populist) 3.9%
Missouri 2	Uriel S. Hall	Democratic	1892	Incumbent retired. Democratic hold.	▌ ✓ Robert N. Bodine (Democratic) 55.7%; ▌ C. A. Loomis (Republican) 41.7%; ▌ J. T. Palson (Populist) 2.6%
Missouri 3	Alexander M. Dockery	Democratic	1882	Incumbent re-elected.	▌ ✓ Alexander M. Dockery (Democratic) 53.5%; ▌ H. G. Orton (Republican) 41.6%; ▌ Hardin Steele (Populist) 4.9%
Missouri 4	George C. Crowther	Republican	1894	Incumbent lost re-election. Democratic gain.	▌ ✓ Charles F. Cochran (Democratic) 54.7%; ▌ George C. Crowther (Republican) 45.0%; ▌ Willis Weaver (Prohibition) 0.3%
Missouri 5	Robert T. Van Horn	Republican	1894	Incumbent lost renomination. Democratic gain.	▌ ✓ William S. Cowherd (Democratic) 54.9%; ▌ Jay H. Neff (Republican) 45.1%
Missouri 6	David A. De Armond	Democratic	1890	Incumbent re-elected.	▌ ✓ David A. De Armond (Democratic) 53.5%; ▌ Frank V. Hamilton (Republican) 39.7%; ▌ H. B. Linton (Populist) 6.2%; ▌ William M. Godwin (Prohibition) 0.6%
Missouri 7	John P. Tracey	Republican	1894	Incumbent lost re-election. Democratic gain.	▌ ✓ James Cooney (Democratic) 53.5%; ▌ John P. Tracey (Republican) 41.8%; ▌ John R. Thomas (Populist) 4.3%; ▌ Richard T. Bond (Prohibition) 0.4%
Missouri 8	Joel D. Hubbard	Republican	1894	Incumbent lost re-election. Democratic gain.	▌ ✓ Richard P. Bland (Democratic) 53.7%; ▌ Joel D. Hubbard (Republican) 43.1%; ▌ J. H. Steincipher (Populist) 3.2%
Missouri 9	William M. Treloar	Republican	1894	Incumbent lost re-election. Democratic gain.	▌ ✓ Champ Clark (Democratic) 53.0%; ▌ William M. Treloar (Republican) 46.4%; ▌ B. O. Simms (Populist) 0.6%
Missouri 10	Richard Bartholdt	Republican	1892	Incumbent re-elected.	▌ ✓ Richard Bartholdt (Republican) 73.2%; ▌ Charles A. Lemp (Democratic) 26.0%; ▌ Carl Meier (Socialist Labor) 0.8%
Missouri 11	Charles F. Joy	Republican	1892	Incumbent re-elected.	▌ ✓ Charles F. Joy (Republican) 53.3%; ▌ John T. Hunt (Democratic/Populist) 46.4%; ▌ August F. Haeussler (Socialist Labor) 0.3%
Missouri 12	Seth W. Cobb	Democratic	1890	Incumbent retired. Republican gain.	▌ ✓ Charles E. Pearce (Republican) 54.9%; ▌ Robert H. Kern (Democratic) 44.9%; ▌ Louis Crusius (Socialist Labor) 0.2%
Missouri 13	John H. Raney	Republican	1894	Incumbent lost renomination. Democratic gain.	▌ ✓ Edward Robb (Democratic) 51.9%; ▌ George Steel (Republican) 44.4%; ▌ George Bond (Populist) 3.7%
Missouri 14	Norman A. Mozley	Republican	1894	Incumbent retired. Democratic gain.	▌ ✓ Willard Duncan Vandiver (Democratic) 49.6%; ▌ John A. Snider (Republican) 40.8%; ▌ Ambrose H. Livingston (Populist) 9.6%
Missouri 15	Charles G. Burton	Republican	1894	Incumbent lost re-election. Democratic gain.	▌ ✓ Maecenas E. Benton (Democratic) 55.7%; ▌ Charles G. Burton (Republican) 39.2%; ▌ George Frank (Populist) 4.4%; ▌ Charles A. Mitchell (Prohibition) 0.7%

== Montana ==
District	Incumbent			This race	
District	Member	Party	First elected	Results	Candidates
Montana at-large	Charles S. Hartman	Republican	1892	Incumbent re-elected as a Silver Republican. Silver Republican gain.	▌ ✓ Charles S. Hartman (Silver Republican) 78.14%; ▌O. F. Goddard (Republican) 21.86%

== Nebraska ==
District	Incumbent			This race	
District	Member	Party	First elected	Results	Candidates
Nebraska 1	Jesse B. Strode	Republican	1894	Incumbent re-elected.	▌ ✓ Jesse B. Strode (Republican) 49.39%; ▌Jefferson H. Broady (Democratic/Populist) 48.77%; ▌Charles E. Smith (Prohibition) 1.22%; ▌Hampton E. George (National) 0.62%
Nebraska 2	David H. Mercer	Republican	1892	Incumbent re-elected.	▌ ✓ David H. Mercer (Republican) 52.31%; ▌Edward R. Duffie (Democratic/Populist) 46.77%; Others: ▌Charles Watts (Prohibition) 0.71%; ▌George W. Woodbey (National) 0.21%
Nebraska 3	George de Rue Meiklejohn	Republican	1892	Incumbent retired. Populist gain.	▌ ✓ Samuel Maxwell (Populist/Democratic) 54.76%; ▌R. L. Hammond (Republican) 43.44%; ▌David Brown (Prohibition) 1.22%; ▌Charles M. Griffith (National) 0.59%
Nebraska 4	Eugene J. Hainer	Republican	1892	Incumbent lost re-election. Populist gain.	▌ ✓ William L. Stark (Populist/Democratic) 50.54%; ▌Eugene J. Hainer (Republican) 46.42%; ▌R. E. Dumphrey (Democratic) 1.72%; ▌B. Spurlock (Prohibition) 1.05%; ▌William H. Dech (Independent) 0.28%
Nebraska 5	William E. Andrews	Republican	1894	Incumbent lost re-election. Populist gain.	▌ ✓ Roderick D. Sutherland (Populist/Democratic) 52.66%; ▌William E. Andrews (Republican) 44.88%; ▌Ransom S. Proudfit (Prohibition) 1.25%; Others: ▌Charles W. Preston (Democratic) 0.77%; ▌J. S. Miller (National) 0.44%
Nebraska 6	Omer M. Kem	Populist	1890	Incumbent retired. Populist hold.	▌ ✓ William L. Greene (Populist/Democratic) 55.73%; ▌Addison E. Cady (Republican) 42.68%; ▌A. D. George (Prohibition) 1.25%; ▌A. C. Sloan (National Prohibition) 0.34%

== Nevada ==
District	Incumbent			This race	
District	Member	Party	First elected	Results	Candidates
Nevada at-large	Francis G. Newlands	Silver	1892	Incumbent re-elected.	▌ ✓ Francis G. Newlands (Silver/Democratic) 66.3%; ▌ James C. Doughty (Populist) 20.1%; ▌ M. J. Davis (Republican) 13.6%

== New Hampshire ==
District	Incumbent			This race	
District	Member	Party	First elected	Results	Candidates
New Hampshire 1	Cyrus A. Sulloway	Republican	1894	Incumbent re-elected.	▌ ✓ Cyrus A. Sulloway (Republican) 63.0%; ▌ John B. Nash (Democratic) 34.2%; ▌ Henry E. Brawn (Prohibition) 1.5%; ▌ Benjamin T. Whitehouse (Socialist Labor) 0.7%; ▌ Charles W. Coolidge (National Democratic) 0.3%; ▌ Josiah A. Whittier (Populist) 0.3%
New Hampshire 2	Henry M. Baker	Republican	1892	Incumbent retired. Republican hold.	▌ ✓ Frank G. Clarke (Republican) 64.3%; ▌ Daniel M. White (Democratic) 33.4%; ▌ Allen W. Wark (Prohibition) 1.3%; ▌ Arthur H. Drury (National Democratic) 0.5%; ▌ Elias M. Blodgett (Populist) 0.5%

== New Jersey ==
District	Incumbent			This race	
District	Member	Party	First elected	Results	Candidates
New Jersey 1	Henry C. Loudenslager	Republican	1892	Incumbent re-elected.	▌ ✓ Henry C. Loudenslager (Republican) 64.2%; ▌ John T. Wright (Democratic/Populist) 32.6%; ▌ Rudolphus Bingham (Prohibition) 2.9%; ▌ Frank F. Mills (Socialist Labor) 0.3%
New Jersey 2	John J. Gardner	Republican	1892	Incumbent re-elected.	▌ ✓ John J. Gardner (Republican) 66.0%; ▌ Abraham E. Conrow (Democratic/Populist) 29.3%; ▌ R. Lowber Temple (National Democratic) 2.3%; ▌ J. Bailey Adams (Prohibition) 2.2%; ▌ George Yardley (Socialist Labor) 0.2%
New Jersey 3	Benjamin F. Howell	Republican	1894	Incumbent re-elected.	▌ ✓ Benjamin F. Howell (Republican) 57.8%; ▌ John A. Wells (Democratic) 38.3%; ▌ [FNU] Jones (National Democratic) 2.3%; ▌ Arthur W. Marshall (Prohibition) 1.2%; ▌ [FNU] Henry (Socialist Labor) 0.4%
New Jersey 4	Mahlon Pitney	Republican	1894	Incumbent re-elected.	▌ ✓ Mahlon Pitney (Republican/Nat. Dem.) 52.5%; ▌ Augustus W. Cutler (Democratic) 44.8%; ▌ Theodore N. Logan (Prohibition) 2.7%
New Jersey 5	James F. Stewart	Republican	1894	Incumbent re-elected.	▌ ✓ James F. Stewart (Republican) 59.9%; ▌ Addison Ely (Democratic) 34.3%; ▌ [FNU] Banks (National Democratic) 2.3%; ▌ [FNU] Wilson (Socialist Labor) 3.4%; ▌ Mahlon B. Reed (Prohibition) 0.9%
New Jersey 6	Richard W. Parker	Republican	1894	Incumbent re-elected.	▌ ✓ Richard W. Parker (Republican) 64.2%; ▌ Joseph A. Beecher (Democratic) 31.8%; ▌ W. J. Peoples (National Democratic) 1.7%; ▌ J. E. Billings (Socialist Labor) 1.6%; ▌ Oliver B. Hardin (Prohibition) 0.7%
New Jersey 7	Thomas McEwan Jr.	Republican	1894	Incumbent re-elected.	▌ ✓ Thomas McEwan Jr. (Republican) 51.8%; ▌ Alexander C. Young (Democratic) 44.2%; ▌ [FNU] Campbell (Socialist Labor) 1.7%; ▌ Rynier J. Wortendyke (National Democratic) 1.5%; ▌ [FNU] Ginner (Silver Democratic) 0.4%; ▌ John F. McCracken (Prohibition) 0.4%
New Jersey 8	Charles N. Fowler	Republican	1894	Incumbent re-elected.	▌ ✓ Charles N. Fowler (Republican) 61.7%; ▌ Freeman O. Willey (Democratic) 33.1%; ▌ [FNU] Noyes (National Democratic) 2.7%; ▌ [FNU] Campbell (Socialist Labor) 1.4%; ▌ Samuel Wilson (Prohibition) 1.1%

== New York ==
District	Incumbent			This race	
District	Member	Party	First elected	Results	Candidates
New York 1	Richard C. McCormick	Republican	1894	Incumbent retired. Republican hold.	▌ ✓ Joseph M. Belford (Republican) 59.4%; ▌ William D. Marvel (Democratic) 34.8%; ▌ William A. Hazard (National Democratic) 3.8%; ▌ Joseph P. Jones (Socialist Labor) 2.0%
New York 2	Denis M. Hurley	Republican	1894	Incumbent re-elected.	▌ ✓ Denis M. Hurley (Republican) 50.8%; ▌ John Michael Clancy (Democratic) 44.2%; ▌ William C. Redfield (National Democratic) 4.3%; ▌ Emanuel T. Holmes (Socialist Labor) 0.4%; ▌ Isaac K. Funk (Prohibition) 0.3%
New York 3	Francis H. Wilson	Republican	1894	Incumbent re-elected.	▌ ✓ Francis H. Wilson (Republican) 56.3%; ▌ Charles F. Brandt (Democratic) 38.5%; ▌ John A. Hennessy (National Democratic) 4.3%; ▌ Charles L. Furman (Socialist Labor) 0.5%; ▌ William B. Waldron (Prohibition) 0.4%
New York 4	Israel F. Fischer	Republican	1894	Incumbent re-elected.	▌ ✓ Israel F. Fischer (Republican) 56.2%; ▌ Thomas F. Larkin (Democratic) 40.0%; ▌ Theodore S. Nye (National Democratic) 2.3%; ▌ Albert Klein (Socialist Labor) 1.2%; ▌ James E. Ramsey (Prohibition) 0.3%
New York 5	Charles G. Bennett	Republican	1894	Incumbent re-elected.	▌ ✓ Charles G. Bennett (Republican) 57.4%; ▌ Thomas S. Delaney (Democratic) 36.1%; ▌ Leopold Schmidt (Socialist Labor) 4.3%; ▌ Joseph S. Van Wyck (National Democratic) 2.0%; ▌ Albert A. Walker (Prohibition) 0.2%
New York 6	James R. Howe	Republican	1894	Incumbent re-elected.	▌ ✓ James R. Howe (Republican) 49.1%; ▌ William Fickermann (Democratic) 45.8%; ▌ Gustav A. Rosenblath (Socialist Labor) 3.0%; ▌ Daniel Walsh (National Democratic) 1.1%; ▌ John J. Conklin (Populist) 0.5%; ▌ Oscar E. Langer (Independent Citizen) 0.3%; ▌ Conrad H. Palmateer (Prohibition) 0.2%
New York 7	Franklin Bartlett	Democratic	1892	Incumbent lost re-election as a Nat. Democratic/Republican. Democratic hold.	▌ ✓ John H. G. Vehslage (Democratic) 51.9%; ▌ Franklin Bartlett (Nat. Democratic/Republican) 46.4%; ▌ John H. Moore (Socialist Labor) 0.9%; ▌ John W. Rhines (Prohibition) 0.8%
New York 8	John M. Mitchell	Republican	1894	Incumbent re-elected.	▌ ✓ John M. Mitchell (Republican/Nat. Democratic) 52.6%; ▌ James J. Walsh (Democratic) 46.3%; ▌ William F. Westerfield (Socialist Labor) 0.7%; ▌ James C. Witter (Prohibition) 0.4%
New York 9	Henry C. Miner	Democratic	1894	Incumbent retired. Democratic hold.	▌ ✓ Thomas J. Bradley (Democratic) 46.3%; ▌ Timothy J. Campbell (Nat. Democratic/Republican) 35.2%; ▌Daniel De Leon (Socialist Labor) 18.4%; ▌ William McElveen (Prohibition) 0.1%
New York 10	Amos J. Cummings	Democratic	1895	Incumbent re-elected.	▌ ✓ Amos J. Cummings (Democratic) 53.3%; ▌ Clarence W. Meade (Republican) 43.5%; ▌ Calvin Tompkins (National Democratic) 1.6%; ▌ William Ruddy (Socialist Labor) 1.2%; ▌ Fletcher Hamlin (Independent) 0.4%
New York 11	William Sulzer	Democratic	1894	Incumbent re-elected.	▌ ✓ William Sulzer (Democratic) 48.8%; ▌ Ferdinand Eidman (Republican) 41.8%; ▌ Herman Miller (Socialist Labor) 8.1%; ▌ Thomas J. O'Connor (National Democratic) 1.1%; ▌ John E. Hanson (Prohibition) 0.2%
New York 12	George B. McClellan Jr.	Democratic	1894	Incumbent re-elected.	▌ ✓ George B. McClellan Jr. (Democratic) 50.9%; ▌ Charles A. Hess (Republican) 43.9%; ▌ Marion M. Miller (Populist) 3.3%; ▌ Charles B. Copp (Socialist Labor) 1.5%; ▌ Wilbur S. Hobbs (Prohibition) 0.4%
New York 13	Richard C. Shannon	Republican	1894	Incumbent re-elected.	▌ ✓ Richard C. Shannon (Republican) 48.0%; ▌ Thomas Smith (Democratic) 43.8%; ▌ Joseph H. Madden (National Democratic) 3.2%; ▌ Isidore Phillips (Socialist Labor) 1.8%; ▌ John J. Murphy (Populist) 1.6%; ▌ Thomas F. Rightmire (Independent Republican) 1.3%; ▌ Francis M. Hammond (Prohibition) 0.3%
New York 14	Lemuel E. Quigg	Republican	1894	Incumbent re-elected.	▌ ✓ Lemuel E. Quigg (Republican) 55.5%; ▌ John Quincy Adams (Democratic) 37.0%; ▌ Charles V. Fornes (National Democratic) 4.7%; ▌ Richard Morton (Socialist Labor) 2.5%; ▌ Benjamin T. Rogers (Prohibition) 0.3%
New York 15	Philip B. Low	Republican	1894	Incumbent re-elected.	▌ ✓ Philip B. Low (Republican/Nat. Democratic) 54.5%; ▌ William H. Burke (Democratic) 41.5%; ▌ Enoch K. Thomas (Socialist Labor) 3.4%; ▌ Archie C. Fisk (Populist) 0.4%; ▌ Oscar A. Gage (Prohibition) 0.2%
New York 16	Benjamin L. Fairchild	Republican	1894	Incumbent lost re-election as an Independent candidate. Republican hold.	▌ ✓ William L. Ward (Republican) 52.6%; ▌ Eugene B. Travis (Democratic) 40.2%; ▌ James V. Lawrence (National Democratic) 2.9%; ▌ Lucien Sanial (Socialist Labor) 2.2%; ▌ Benjamin L. Fairchild (Independent) 1.3%; ▌ James H. Hardy (Prohibition) 0.8%
New York 17	Benjamin Odell	Republican	1894	Incumbent re-elected.	▌ ✓ Benjamin Odell (Republican) 58.5%; ▌ David A. Morrison (Democratic) 40.1%; ▌ Robert A. Widenmann (National Democratic) 1.2%; ▌ Joseph Schmitt (Socialist Labor) 0.2%
New York 18	Jacob LeFever	Republican	1892	Incumbent retired. Republican hold.	▌ ✓ John H. Ketcham (Republican) 60.9%; ▌ Richard E. Connell (Democratic) 38.0%; ▌ Henry Metcalf (National Democratic) 1.1%
New York 19	Frank S. Black	Republican	1894	Incumbent resigned after being elected Governor of New York. Republican hold.	▌ ✓ Aaron Van Schaick Cochrane (Republican) 55.7%; ▌ George G. Miller (Democratic) 42.0%; ▌ Nathaniel B. Powers (Prohibition) 1.1%; ▌ Elmer T. Haines (National Democratic) 0.9%; ▌ Lawrence A. Boland (Socialist Labor) 0.3%
New York 20	George N. Southwick	Republican	1894	Incumbent re-elected.	▌ ✓ George N. Southwick (Republican) 54.7%; ▌ Thomas F. Wilkinson (Democratic/Populist) 43.2%; ▌ Simeon Holroyd (National Democratic) 1.0%; ▌ John C. Sanford (Prohibition) 0.6%; ▌ Edwin O. Smith (Socialist Labor) 0.5%
New York 21	David F. Wilber	Republican	1894	Incumbent re-elected.	▌ ✓ David F. Wilber (Republican) 55.7%; ▌ John H. Bagley Jr. (Democratic) 43.4%; ▌ Leslie Pell Clarke (Prohibition) 0.9%
New York 22	Newton Martin Curtis	Republican	1891	Incumbent retired. Republican hold.	▌ ✓ Lucius Littauer (Republican) 93.3%; ▌ James T. Sweetman (Prohibition) 4.7%; ▌ John C. Greene (National Democratic) 2.0%
New York 23	Wallace T. Foote Jr.	Republican	1894	Incumbent re-elected.	▌ ✓ Wallace T. Foote Jr. (Republican) 97.0%; ▌ Winfield A. Huppuch (National Democratic) 1.6%; ▌ DeMyre S. Fero (Populist) 1.4%
New York 24	Charles A. Chickering	Republican	1892	Incumbent re-elected.	▌ ✓ Charles A. Chickering (Republican) 61.4%; ▌ Oscar M. Wood (Democratic) 36.6%; ▌ Frederick B. Devendorf (Prohibition) 2.0%
New York 25	James S. Sherman	Republican	1892	Incumbent re-elected.	▌ ✓ James S. Sherman (Republican/Nat. Democratic) 60.8%; ▌ Cornelius Haley (Democratic/Populist) 37.2%; ▌ William D. Towsley (Prohibition) 2.0%
New York 26	George W. Ray	Republican	1890	Incumbent re-elected.	▌ ✓ George W. Ray (Republican) 60.8%; ▌ Alexander D. Wales (Democratic/Populist) 35.7%; ▌ William C. Moulton (Prohibition) 2.6%; ▌ Charles S. Hall (National Democratic) 0.9%
New York 27	Theodore L. Poole	Republican	1894	Incumbent lost re-election as an Ind. Republican/Democratic candidate. Republican hold.	▌ ✓ James J. Belden (Republican) 53.2%; ▌ Theodore L. Poole (Ind. Republican/Democratic) 44.0%; ▌ Charles H. Corregan (Socialist Labor) 1.6%; ▌ Heman D. Fulton (Prohibition) 1.2%
New York 28	Sereno E. Payne	Republican	1889	Incumbent re-elected.	▌ ✓ Sereno E. Payne (Republican) 62.4%; ▌ Robert L. Drummond (Democratic/Populist) 36.8%; ▌ Francis O. Mason (National Democratic) 0.8%
New York 29	Charles W. Gillet	Republican	1892	Incumbent re-elected.	▌ ✓ Charles W. Gillet (Republican) 59.7%; ▌ Henry W. Bowes (Democratic) 39.5%; ▌ De Merville Page (National Democratic) 0.8%
New York 30	James W. Wadsworth	Republican	1890	Incumbent re-elected.	▌ ✓ James W. Wadsworth (Republican) 57.3%; ▌ Frank P. Hulette (Democratic) 38.4%; ▌ Charles Fremont Williams (Prohibition) 2.6%; ▌ George A. Sweet (National Democratic) 0.9%; ▌ John Ideson (Populist) 0.8%
New York 31	Henry C. Brewster	Republican	1894	Incumbent re-elected.	▌ ✓ Henry C. Brewster (Republican) 56.9%; ▌ William E. Ryan (Democratic) 38.3%; ▌ Howard W. Sneck (Populist) 1.4%; ▌ William R. Hunt (Prohibition) 1.2%; ▌ Frank A. Sieverman (Socialist Labor) 1.1%; ▌ William Henry Davis (National Democratic) 0.9%
New York 32	Rowland B. Mahany	Republican	1894	Incumbent re-elected.	▌ ✓ Rowland B. Mahany (Republican) 54.7%; ▌ Charles Rung (Democratic) 43.4%; ▌ Mark B. Moore (National Democratic) 0.9%; ▌ Joseph Otto (Socialist Labor) 0.7%; ▌ Stephen Lockwood (Prohibition) 0.3%
New York 33	Charles Daniels	Republican	1892	Incumbent retired. Republican hold.	▌ ✓ De Alva S. Alexander (Republican) 63.0%; ▌ Harvey W. Richardson (Democratic) 33.4%; ▌ George Wing (National Democratic) 2.1%; ▌ John A. Sayles (Prohibition) 1.0%; ▌ August Miller (Socialist Labor) 0.5%
New York 34	Warren B. Hooker	Republican	1890	Incumbent re-elected.	▌ ✓ Warren B. Hooker (Republican) 86.0%; ▌ David Frank Allen (Populist) 9.2%; ▌ Ancel M. Taylor (Prohibition) 3.6%; ▌ Staley N. Wood (National Democratic) 1.2%

== North Carolina ==
District	Incumbent			This race	
District	Member	Party	First elected	Results	Candidates
North Carolina 1	Harry Skinner	Populist	1894	Incumbent re-elected.	▌ ✓ Harry Skinner (Populist/Republican) 58.3%; ▌ Wilson H. Lucas (Democratic) 41.7%
North Carolina 2	Frederick A. Woodard	Democratic	1892	Incumbent lost re-election. Republican gain.	▌ ✓ George Henry White (Republican) 51.6%; ▌ Frederick A. Woodard (Democratic) 41.1%; ▌ S. Moss (Populist) 7.3%
North Carolina 3	John G. Shaw	Democratic	1894	Incumbent lost renomination. Populist gain.	▌ ✓ John Edgar Fowler (Populist/Republican) 58.9%; ▌ Frank Thompson (Democratic) 41.1%
North Carolina 4	William F. Strowd	Populist	1894	Incumbent re-elected.	▌ ✓ William F. Strowd (Populist/Republican) 55.6%; ▌ Edward W. Pou (Democratic) 43.5%; ▌ [FNU] Banks (Independent Republican) 0.8%; ▌ G. B. Alford (Gold Democratic) 0.1%
North Carolina 5	Thomas Settle	Republican	1892	Incumbent lost re-election. Democratic gain.	▌ ✓ William Walton Kitchin (Democratic) 49.9%; ▌ Thomas Settle (Republican) 48.8%; ▌ A. J. Dolby (Populist) 1.3%
North Carolina 6	Charles H. Martin	Populist	1894	Incumbent re-elected.	▌ ✓ Charles H. Martin (Populist/Republican) 56.1%; ▌ James A. Lockhart (Democratic) 43.9%
North Carolina 7	Alonzo C. Shuford	Populist	1894	Incumbent re-elected.	▌ ✓ Alonzo C. Shuford (Populist/Republican) 55.3%; ▌ Samuel J. Pemberton (Democratic) 44.7%
North Carolina 8	Romulus Z. Linney	Republican	1894	Incumbent re-elected.	▌ ✓ Romulus Z. Linney (Republican/Populist) 51.8%; ▌ Rufus A. Doughton (Democratic) 48.0%; ▌ William M. White (Prohibition) 0.2%
North Carolina 9	Richmond Pearson	Republican	1894	Incumbent re-elected.	▌ ✓ Richmond Pearson (Republican) 51.6%; ▌ Joseph S. Adams (Democratic) 48.3%; ▌ J. P. Herran (Populist) 0.1%

== North Dakota ==
District	Incumbent			This race	
District	Member	Party	First elected	Results	Candidates
North Dakota at-large	Martin N. Johnson	Republican	1890	Incumbent re-elected.	▌ ✓ Martin N. Johnson (Republican) 53.97%; ▌John Burke (Democratic) 45.28%; ▌A. V. Garver (Prohibition) 0.75%

== Ohio ==
District	Incumbent			This race	
District	Member	Party	First elected	Results	Candidates
Ohio 1	Charles Phelps Taft	Republican	1894	Incumbent retired. Republican hold.	▌ ✓ William B. Shattuc (Republican) 60.8%; ▌Thomas J. Donnelly (Democratic) 39.2%
Ohio 2	Jacob H. Bromwell	Republican	1894	Incumbent re-elected.	▌ ✓ Jacob H. Bromwell (Republican) 59.0%; ▌David S. Oliver (Democratic) 41.0%
Ohio 3	Paul J. Sorg	Democratic	1894	Incumbent retired. Democratic hold.	▌ ✓ John L. Brenner (Democratic) 49.8%; ▌Robert M. Nevin (Republican) 49.4%; Others: ▌Joel S. Steward (Populist) 0.6%; ▌Samuel N. Stubbs (National) 0.2%
Ohio 4	Fernando C. Layton	Democratic	1890	Incumbent retired. Democratic hold.	▌ ✓ George A. Marshall (Democratic) 59.5%; ▌John P. Maclean (Republican) 38.6%; ▌L. M. Kramer (Populist) 1.1%; ▌George W. Mace (National) 0.7%
Ohio 5	Francis B. De Witt	Republican	1894	Incumbent lost re-election. Democratic gain.	▌ ✓ David Meekison (Democratic) 56.0%; ▌Francis B. De Witt (Republican) 42.5%; ▌George N. Rice (Populist) 1.5%
Ohio 6	George W. Hulick	Republican	1892	Incumbent lost renomination. Republican hold.	▌ ✓ Seth W. Brown (Republican) 53.8%; ▌Harry W. Paxton (Democratic) 45.4%; ▌Frank S. Delo (Populist) 0.7%
Ohio 7	George W. Wilson	Republican	1892	Incumbent retired. Republican hold.	▌ ✓ Walter L. Weaver (Republican) 52.5%; ▌Francis M. Hunt (Democratic) 46.8%; ▌R. S. Thomson (National) 0.8%
Ohio 8	Luther M. Strong	Republican	1892	Incumbent lost renomination. Republican hold.	▌ ✓ Archibald Lybrand (Republican) 53.8%; ▌McEldin Dun (Democratic) 46.2%
Ohio 9	James H. Southard	Republican	1894	Incumbent re-elected.	▌ ✓ James H. Southard (Republican) 53.5%; ▌Stephen Brophy (Democratic) 46.5%
Ohio 10	Lucien J. Fenton	Republican	1894	Incumbent re-elected.	▌ ✓ Lucien J. Fenton (Republican) 57.9%; ▌Timothy S. Hogan (Democratic) 42.1%; Scattering <0.1%
Ohio 11	Charles H. Grosvenor	Republican	1892	Incumbent re-elected.	▌ ✓ Charles H. Grosvenor (Republican) 54.8%; ▌William E. Finck Jr. (Democratic) 44.7%; ▌Lawrence C. Crippen (Populist) 0.4%
Ohio 12	David K. Watson	Republican	1894	Incumbent lost re-election. Democratic gain.	▌ ✓ John J. Lentz (Democratic) 49.73%; ▌David K. Watson (Republican) 49.63%; Others: ▌Jacob B. Turner (Populist) 0.40%; ▌L. J. Finley (Populist) 0.25%
Ohio 13	Stephen Ross Harris	Republican	1894	Incumbent lost re-election. Democratic gain.	▌ ✓ James A. Norton (Democratic) 54.4%; ▌Stephen Ross Harris (Republican) 44.3%; Others: ▌John H. Rhodes (Populist) 0.9%; ▌John W. Belser (Populist) 0.5%
Ohio 14	Winfield S. Kerr	Republican	1894	Incumbent re-elected.	▌ ✓ Winfield S. Kerr (Republican) 52.0%; ▌John B. Coffinberry (Democratic) 47.6%; ▌Robert F. Mosher (National) 0.4%
Ohio 15	H. Clay Van Voorhis	Republican	1892	Incumbent re-elected.	▌ ✓ H. Clay Van Voorhis (Republican) 52.5%; ▌James B. Tannehill (Democratic) 46.2%; Others: ▌T. H. Padan (Populist) 0.8%; ▌Illion E. Moore (Populist) 0.5%
Ohio 16	Lorenzo Danford	Republican	1894	Incumbent re-elected.	▌ ✓ Lorenzo Danford (Republican) 53.8%; ▌Henry H. McFadden (Democratic) 46.2%
Ohio 17	Addison S. McClure	Republican	1894	Incumbent lost re-election. Democratic gain.	▌ ✓ John A. McDowell (Democratic) 54.7%; ▌Addison S. McClure (Republican) 44.3%; Others: ▌I. N. Kieffer (Populist) 0.8%; ▌Homer E. Cole (National) 0.2%; Scattering 0.1%
Ohio 18	Robert W. Tayler	Republican	1894	Incumbent re-elected.	▌ ✓ Robert W. Tayler (Republican) 54.1%; ▌Isaac R. Sherwood (Democratic) 45.0%; Others: ▌James L. Swan (Populist) 0.9%; Scattering <0.1%
Ohio 19	Stephen A. Northway	Republican	1892	Incumbent re-elected.	▌ ✓ Stephen A. Northway (Republican) 60.3%; ▌William T. Sawyer (Democratic) 39.1%; Others: ▌Solon C. Thayer (Populist) 0.6%; Scattering <0.1%
Ohio 20	Clifton B. Beach	Republican	1894	Incumbent re-elected.	▌ ✓ Clifton B. Beach (Republican) 52.78%; ▌A. T. Van Tassel (Democratic) 46.01%; Others: ▌J. J. Harrison (Populist) 0.54%; ▌Paul Dinger (Socialist Labor) 0.51%; ▌William H. Watkins (National) 0.16%
Ohio 21	Theodore E. Burton	Republican	1894	Incumbent re-elected.	▌ ✓ Theodore E. Burton (Republican) 55.24%; ▌L. A. Russell (Democratic) 43.34%; Others: ▌Louis B. Tuckerman (Populist) 0.49%; ▌Walter Gillet (Socialist Labor) 0.44%; ▌E. Jay Pinney (Populist) 0.38%; ▌Thomas P. McDonough (National) 0.11%

== Oregon ==
District	Incumbent			This race	
District	Member	Party	First elected	Results	Candidates
Oregon 1	Binger Hermann	Republican	1892	Incumbent retired. Republican hold.	▌ ✓ Thomas H. Tongue (Republican) 40.39%; ▌W. S. Vandenberg (Populist) 40.26%; ▌Jefferson Myers (Democratic) 16.52%; ▌N. C. Christensen (Prohibition) 2.83%
Oregon 2	William R. Ellis	Republican	1892	Incumbent re-elected.	▌ ✓ William R. Ellis (Republican) 30.38%; ▌Martin Quinn (Populist) 29.47%; ▌H. H. Northrup (Independent) 21.20%; ▌A. S. Bennett (Democratic) 17.09%; ▌F. McKercher (Prohibition) 1.87%

== Pennsylvania ==
District	Incumbent			This race	
District	Member	Party	First elected	Results	Candidates
Pennsylvania 1	Henry H. Bingham	Republican	1878	Incumbent re-elected.	▌ ✓ Henry H. Bingham (Republican) 69.7%; ▌ Horace E. James (Democratic) 30.0%; ▌ J. Lewis Jenkins (Prohibition) 0.3%
Pennsylvania 2	Robert Adams Jr.	Republican	1893	Incumbent re-elected.	▌ ✓ Robert Adams Jr. (Republican) 78.0%; ▌ Fenton P. F. Mullins (Democratic) 21.4%; ▌ Edward B. Cooper (Prohibition) 0.5%
Pennsylvania 3	Frederick Halterman	Republican	1894	Incumbent lost re-election. Democratic gain.	▌ ✓ William McAleer (Democratic) 49.7%; ▌ Frederick Halterman (Republican) 40.7%; ▌ Samuel E. Hudson (Free Silver) 8.8%; ▌ Frederick G. Haecker (Socialist Labor) 0.6%; ▌ Charles Rhoades (Prohibition) 0.2%
Pennsylvania 4	John E. Reyburn	Republican	1890	Incumbent lost renomination. Republican hold.	▌ ✓ James R. Young (Republican) 77.6%; ▌ Mark D. Cunningham (Democratic) 21.7%; ▌ A. T. Evanson (Prohibition) 0.7%
Pennsylvania 5	Alfred C. Harmer	Republican	1876	Incumbent re-elected.	▌ ✓ Alfred C. Harmer (Republican) 76.1%; ▌ Frank D. Wright (Democratic/Populist) 23.0%; ▌ Samuel Christian (Prohibition) 0.5%; ▌ Ernest Kreft (Socialist Labor) 0.3%
Pennsylvania 6	John B. Robinson	Republican	1890	Incumbent lost re-election. Independent Republican gain.	▌ ✓ Thomas S. Butler (Independent Republican) 39.4%; ▌ John B. Robinson (Republican) 35.1%; ▌ William H. Berry (Democratic/Free Silver) 24.4%; ▌ Jesse G. Yeager (Prohibition) 1.1%
Pennsylvania 7	Irving P. Wanger	Republican	1892	Incumbent re-elected.	▌ ✓ Irving P. Wanger (Republican) 60.7%; ▌ Charles S. Van de Grift (Democratic) 38.1%; ▌ B. G. Parker (Prohibition) 1.2%
Pennsylvania 8	Joseph J. Hart	Democratic	1894	Incumbent retired. Republican gain.	▌ ✓ William S. Kirkpatrick (Republican) 50.5%; ▌ Laird Howard Barber (Democratic) 49.5%
Pennsylvania 9	Constantine J. Erdman	Democratic	1892	Incumbent retired. Democratic hold.	▌ ✓ Daniel Ermentrout (Democratic) 51.1%; ▌ Oliver Williams (Republican) 45.0%; ▌ George H. Heffner (Populist) 2.0%; ▌ Thomas Polk Merrit (Jefferson Democratic) 1.0%; ▌ Isaac P. Merkel (Prohibition) 0.8%
Pennsylvania 10	Marriott Brosius	Republican	1888	Incumbent re-elected.	▌ ✓ Marriott Brosius (Republican) 73.3%; ▌ Edward D. Reilly (Democratic) 25.1%; ▌ W. D. Snyder (Prohibition) 1.6%
Pennsylvania 11	Joseph A. Scranton	Republican	1892	Incumbent retired. Republican hold.	▌ ✓ William Connell (Republican) 61.6%; ▌ Edward Merrifield (Democratic) 35.6%; ▌ H. J. Hockenbury (Prohibition) 2.7%; ▌ Jonas Šliūpas (Populist) 0.2%
Pennsylvania 12	John Leisenring	Republican	1894	Incumbent retired. Republican hold.	▌ ✓ Morgan B. Williams (Republican) 52.4%; ▌ John M. Garman (Democratic) 45.0%; ▌ William R. Netherton (Prohibition) 2.0%; ▌ D. O. Coughlin (Populist) 0.6%
Pennsylvania 13	Charles N. Brumm	Republican	1894	Incumbent re-elected.	▌ ✓ Charles N. Brumm (Republican) 53.0%; ▌ Watson F. Shepherd (Democratic) 46.3%; ▌ S. G. U. Hollopeter (Prohibition) 0.8%
Pennsylvania 14	Ephraim M. Woomer	Republican	1892	Incumbent lost renomination. Republican hold.	▌ ✓ Marlin E. Olmsted (Republican) 87.6%; ▌ Abraham Mattis (Populist) 6.8%; ▌ B. H. Engle (Prohibition) 3.9%; ▌ J. F. Klugh (Independent Democratic) 1.6%
Pennsylvania 15	James H. Codding	Republican	1895	Incumbent re-elected.	▌ ✓ James H. Codding (Republican) 61.6%; ▌ Charles P. Shaw (Democratic) 34.9%; ▌ Charles H. Dana (Prohibition) 3.5%
Pennsylvania 16	Fred C. Leonard	Republican	1894	Incumbent lost renomination. Republican hold.	▌ ✓ Horace B. Packer (Republican) 56.2%; ▌ Luther B. Seibert (Democratic) 39.5%; ▌ Clevan Dinges (Prohibition) 4.3%
Pennsylvania 17	Monroe H. Kulp	Republican	1894	Incumbent re-elected.	▌ ✓ Monroe H. Kulp (Republican) 50.1%; ▌ Alphonsus Walsh (Democratic) 46.4%; ▌ Martin P. Lutz (Prohibition) 3.5%
Pennsylvania 18	Thaddeus M. Mahon	Republican	1892	Incumbent re-elected.	▌ ✓ Thaddeus M. Mahon (Republican) 61.2%; ▌ Willis F. Kearns (Democratic) 38.8%
Pennsylvania 19	James A. Stahle	Republican	1894	Incumbent retired. Democratic gain.	▌ ✓ George J. Benner (Democratic) 49.7%; ▌ Frank E. Hollar (Republican) 48.0%; ▌ W. H. Albright (Prohibition) 1.2%; ▌ Charles A. Hawkins (Jefferson Democratic) 1.1%
Pennsylvania 20	Josiah D. Hicks	Republican	1892	Incumbent re-elected.	▌ ✓ Josiah D. Hicks (Republican) 43.8%; ▌ Robert C. McNamara (Democratic) 37.9%; ▌ Joseph E. Thropp (Protectionist Republican) 16.4%; ▌ John W. Bracken (Prohibition) 1.7%; ▌ Clement Pietsch (Populist) 0.2%
Pennsylvania 21	Daniel B. Heiner	Republican	1892	Incumbent retired. Republican hold.	▌ ✓ Edward E. Robbins (Republican) 59.9%; ▌ Samuel S. Blyholder (Democratic) 36.3%; ▌ John B. Bair (Prohibition) 2.0%; ▌ St. Clair Thompson (Populist) 1.8%
Pennsylvania 22	John Dalzell	Republican	1886	Incumbent re-elected.	▌ ✓ John Dalzell (Republican) 69.0%; ▌ John F. Miller (Democratic) 30.6%; ▌ Edwin Z. Smith (Jefferson Democratic) 0.4%
Pennsylvania 23	William A. Stone	Republican	1890	Incumbent re-elected.	▌ ✓ William A. Stone (Republican) 77.2%; ▌ Morrison Foster (Democratic) 22.3%; ▌ Judson J. Brooks (Jefferson Democratic) 0.5%
Pennsylvania 24	Ernest F. Acheson	Republican	1894	Incumbent re-elected.	▌ ✓ Ernest F. Acheson (Republican) 57.1%; ▌ John Purman (Democratic/Populist) 41.5%; ▌ B. C. McGrew (Prohibition) 1.4%
Pennsylvania 25	Thomas Wharton Phillips	Republican	1892	Incumbent retired. Winner died before start of term. Republican hold.	▌ ✓ James J. Davidson (Republican) 59.5%; ▌ John G. McConahy (Democratic) 38.2%; ▌ [FNU] Allen (Prohibition) 2.3%
Pennsylvania 26	Matthew Griswold	Republican	1894	Incumbent retired. Republican hold.	▌ ✓ John C. Sturtevant (Republican) 50.4%; ▌ Joseph C. Sibley (Democratic/Populist) 48.5%; ▌ Benjamin Mason (Prohibition) 1.1%
Pennsylvania 27	Charles W. Stone	Republican	1890	Incumbent re-elected.	▌ ✓ Charles W. Stone (Republican) 58.3%; ▌ William J. Breene (Democratic/Populist) 37.2%; ▌ John E. Gill (Prohibition) 0.4%
Pennsylvania 28	William C. Arnold	Republican	1894	Incumbent re-elected.	▌ ✓ William C. Arnold (Republican) 50.2%; ▌ Jackson L. Spangler (Democratic) 47.1%; ▌ John Brennan (Prohibition) 2.7%
Pennsylvania at-large 2 seats on a general ticket.	Galusha A. Grow	Republican	1894	Incumbent re-elected.	▌ ✓ Galusha A. Grow (Republican) 30.7%; ▌ ✓ Samuel A. Davenport (Republican) 30.6%; ▌ Jerome T. Ailman (Democratic/Populist) 18.1%; ▌ DeWitt C. DeWitt (Democratic/Free Silver) 17.9%; ▌ Abraham A. Barker (Prohibition) 0.8%; ▌ George Alcorn (Prohibition) 0.8%; ▌ John P. Correll (Populist) 0.3%; ▌ Hay Walker Jr. (Jefferson Democratic) 0.3%; ▌ Benjamin C. Potts (Jefferson Democratic) 0.3%; ▌ Emil Guwang (Socialist Labor) 0.1%; ▌ Fred W. Long (Socialist Labor) 0.1%; ▌ Henry S. Kent (National Prohibition) 0.03%; ▌ Isaac G. Pollard (National Prohibition) 0.03%
Pennsylvania at-large 2 seats on a general ticket.	George F. Huff	Republican	1894	Incumbent retired. Republican hold.	

== Rhode Island ==
District	Incumbent			This race	
District	Member	Party	First elected	Results	Candidates
Rhode Island 1	Melville Bull	Republican	1894	Incumbent re-elected.	▌ ✓ Melville Bull (Republican) 63.7%; ▌ George T. Brown (Democratic) 31.3%; ▌ James A. Williams (Prohibition) 2.5%; ▌ George A. Ballard (Socialist Labor) 2.4%
Rhode Island 2	Warren O. Arnold	Republican	1894	Incumbent retired. Republican hold.	▌ ✓ Adin B. Capron (Republican) 63.5%; ▌ Lucius F. C. Garvin (Democratic) 30.9%; ▌ Henry B. Metcalfe (Prohibition) 4.6%; ▌ James Jefferson (Socialist Labor) 1.0%

== South Carolina ==
District	Incumbent			This race	
District	Member	Party	First elected	Results	Candidates
South Carolina 1	George W. Murray	Republican	1892	Incumbent lost re-election. Democratic gain.	▌ ✓ William Elliott (Democratic) 63.7%; ▌George W. Murray (Reorganized Rep.) 33.9%; ▌W. Cecil Cohen (Republican) 2.4%
South Carolina 2	W. Jasper Talbert	Democratic	1892	Incumbent re-elected.	▌ ✓ W. Jasper Talbert (Democratic) 92.4%; ▌B. P. Chatfield (Republican) 7.3%; Others 0.3%
South Carolina 3	Asbury Latimer	Democratic	1892	Incumbent re-elected.	▌ ✓ Asbury Latimer (Democratic) 92.0%; ▌A. C. Merreck (Republican) 6.2%; ▌Clarence Gray (Reorganized Rep.) 1.8%
South Carolina 4	Stanyarne Wilson	Democratic	1894	Incumbent re-elected.	▌ ✓ Stanyarne Wilson (Democratic) 92.2%; ▌P. S. Suber (Republican) 4.2%; ▌D. T. Bounds (Reorganized Rep.) 3.6%
South Carolina 5	Thomas J. Strait	Democratic	1892	Incumbent re-elected.	▌ ✓ Thomas J. Strait (Democratic) 91.0%; ▌John F. Jones (Republican) 9.0%
South Carolina 6	John L. McLaurin	Democratic	1892	Incumbent re-elected.	▌ ✓ John L. McLaurin (Democratic) 87.7%; ▌J. E. Wilson (Republican) 7.9%; ▌George Henry McKie (Unknown) 4.3%; Others 0.1%
South Carolina 7	J. William Stokes	Democratic	1894	Incumbent's previous election declared void June 1, 1896 due to electoral fraud. Incumbent re-elected. Incumbent also elected to finish the term.	▌ ✓ J. William Stokes (Democratic) 85.6%; ▌T. B. Johnson (Republican) 14.2%; ▌D. A. Perrin (Ind. Republican) 0.2%

== South Dakota ==
District	Incumbent			This race	
District	Member	Party	First elected	Results	Candidates
South Dakota at-large 2 seats on a general ticket	John Pickler	Republican	1889 (new state)	Incumbent retired. Populist gain.	▌ ✓ John Edward Kelley (Populist) 24.9%; ▌ ✓ Freeman Knowles (Populist) 24.9%; ▌Robert J. Gamble (Republican) 24.8%; ▌Coe I. Crawford (Republican) 24.6%; Others: ▌K. Lewis (Prohibition) 0.4%; ▌M. D. Alexander (Prohibition) 0.4%
South Dakota at-large 2 seats on a general ticket	Robert J. Gamble	Republican	1894	Incumbent lost re-election. Populist gain.	▌ ✓ John Edward Kelley (Populist) 24.9%; ▌ ✓ Freeman Knowles (Populist) 24.9%; ▌Robert J. Gamble (Republican) 24.8%; ▌Coe I. Crawford (Republican) 24.6%; Others: ▌K. Lewis (Prohibition) 0.4%; ▌M. D. Alexander (Prohibition) 0.4%

== Tennessee ==
District	Incumbent			This race	
District	Member	Party	First elected	Results	Candidates
Tennessee 1	William C. Anderson	Republican	1894	Incumbent lost renomination. Republican hold.	▌ ✓ Walter P. Brownlow (Republican) 62.36%; ▌Lacey L. Lawrence (Democratic) 34.71%; ▌W. C. Nelson (Ind. Republican) 2.36%; ▌R. S. Cheves (Prohibition) 0.58%
Tennessee 2	Henry R. Gibson	Republican	1894	Incumbent re-elected.	▌ ✓ Henry R. Gibson (Republican) 74.33%; ▌W. L. Ledgerwood (Democratic) 24.98%; Others: ▌W. C. Murphy (Prohibition) 0.62%; ▌W. M. Oliver (Unknown) 0.08%
Tennessee 3	Foster V. Brown	Republican	1894	Incumbent retired. Democratic gain.	▌ ✓ John A. Moon (Democratic) 51.89%; ▌W. J. Clift (Republican) 47.15%; Others: ▌J. L. Hopkins (Prohibition) 0.60%; ▌W. J. Farris (Populist) 0.35%
Tennessee 4	Benton McMillin	Democratic	1878	Incumbent re-elected.	▌ ✓ Benton McMillin (Democratic) 59.56%; ▌C. H. Whitney (Republican) 40.44%
Tennessee 5	James D. Richardson	Democratic	1884	Incumbent re-elected.	▌ ✓ James D. Richardson (Democratic) 58.56%; ▌Sid Houston (Republican) 32.76%; ▌W. E. Erving (Populist) 8.68%
Tennessee 6	Joseph E. Washington	Democratic	1886	Incumbent retired. Democratic hold.	▌ ✓ John W. Gaines (Democratic) 57.97%; ▌James C. McReynolds (Republican) 39.86%; ▌George A. Gawan (Populist) 2.17%
Tennessee 7	Nicholas N. Cox	Democratic	1890	Incumbent re-elected.	▌ ✓ Nicholas N. Cox (Democratic) 55.18%; ▌A. M. Hughes (Republican) 38.41%; ▌J. K. Blackburn (Populist) 6.41%
Tennessee 8	John E. McCall	Republican	1894	Incumbent lost re-election. Democratic gain.	▌ ✓ Thetus W. Sims (Democratic) 53.45%; ▌John E. McCall (Republican) 42.64%; ▌J. S. Leach (Populist) 3.65%; ▌W. L. Nowell (Prohibition) 0.27%
Tennessee 9	James C. McDearmon	Democratic	1892	Incumbent lost renomination. Democratic hold.	▌ ✓ Rice A. Pierce (Democratic) 64.11%; ▌J. H. McDowell (Populist) 35.89%
Tennessee 10	Josiah Patterson	Democratic	1890	Incumbent lost re-election as a National Democrat. Democratic hold.	▌ ✓ Edward W. Carmack (Democratic) 48.76%; ▌Josiah Patterson (National Democratic) 47.11%; ▌B. G. West (Populist) 4.13%

== Texas ==
District	Incumbent			This race	
District	Member	Party	First elected	Results	Candidates
Texas 1	Joseph C. Hutcheson	Democratic	1892	Incumbent retired. Democratic hold.	▌ ✓ Thomas H. Ball (Democratic) 55.5%; ▌ Joe H. Eagle (Populist/Republican) 44.0%; ▌ A. C. Tompkins (Ind. Republican) 0.5%
Texas 2	Samuel B. Cooper	Democratic	1892	Incumbent re-elected.	▌ ✓ Samuel B. Cooper (Democratic) 57.0%; ▌ Benjamin A. Calhoun (Populist) 29.0%; ▌ J. M. Claiborne (Republican) 14.0%
Texas 3	C. H. Yoakum	Democratic	1894	Incumbent retired. Democratic hold.	▌ ✓ Reese C. De Graffenreid (Democratic) 56.5%; ▌ W. E. Farmer (Populist) 43.5%
Texas 4	David B. Culberson	Democratic	1874	Incumbent retired. Democratic hold.	▌ ✓ John W. Cranford (Democratic) 54.0%; ▌ James H. Davis (Populist) 36.7%; ▌ M. W. Johnson (Nat. Democratic/Republican) 9.3%
Texas 5	Joseph W. Bailey	Democratic	1890	Incumbent re-elected.	▌ ✓ Joseph W. Bailey (Democratic) 61.2%; ▌ W. D. Gordan (Republican) 28.5%; ▌ R. C. Foster (Populist) 10.2%
Texas 6	Jo Abbott	Democratic	1886	Incumbent retired. Democratic hold.	▌ ✓ Robert E. Burke (Democratic) 56.8%; ▌ Barnett Gibbs (Populist/Republican) 43.2%
Texas 7	George C. Pendleton	Democratic	1892	Incumbent retired. Democratic hold.	▌ ✓ Robert L. Henry (Democratic) 55.2%; ▌ T. A. Pope (Republican) 24.5%; ▌ W. F. Douthitt (Populist) 20.3%
Texas 8	Charles K. Bell	Democratic	1892	Incumbent lost renomination. Democratic hold.	▌ ✓ S. W. T. Lanham (Democratic) 53.4%; ▌ Charles H. Jenkins (Populist) 44.7%; ▌ J. Peter Smith (Nat. Democratic) 1.9%
Texas 9	Joseph D. Sayers	Democratic	1884	Incumbent re-elected.	▌ ✓ Joseph D. Sayers (Democratic) 51.4%; ▌ William K. Makemson (Republican) 29.0%; ▌ Reddin Andrews (Populist) 17.1%; ▌ J. T. Harris (Ind. Republican) 2.4%
Texas 10	Miles Crowley	Democratic	1894	Incumbent retired. Republican gain.	▌ ✓ Robert B. Hawley (Republican) 45.7%; ▌ James H. Shelburne (Democratic) 40.2%; ▌ Noah Allen (Populist) 14.0%
Texas 11	Rudolph Kleberg	Democratic	1896	Incumbent re-elected.	▌ ✓ Rudolph Kleberg (Democratic) 45.6%; ▌ H. Grass (Republican) 44.1%; ▌ J. M. Smith (Populist) 9.8%
Texas 12	George H. Noonan	Republican	1894	Incumbent lost re-election. Democratic gain.	▌ ✓ James Luther Slayden (Democratic) 46.0%; ▌ George H. Noonan (Republican) 42.3%; ▌Taylor McRae (Populist) 11.6%
Texas 13	Jeremiah V. Cockrell	Democratic	1892	Incumbent retired. Democratic hold.	▌ ✓ John H. Stephens (Democratic) 61.0%; ▌ Henry L. Bentley (Republican) 37.8%

== Utah ==
District	Incumbent			This race	
District	Member	Party	First elected	Results	Candidates
Utah at-large	Clarence Emir Allen	Republican	1895	Incumbent retired. Democratic gain.	▌ ✓ William H. King (Democratic) 61.2%; ▌ Lafayette Holbrook (Republican) 35.9%; ▌ Warren Foster (Populist) 2.9%

== Vermont ==
District	Incumbent			This race	
District	Member	Party	First elected	Results	Candidates
Vermont 1	H. Henry Powers	Republican	1890	Incumbent re-elected.	▌ ✓ H. Henry Powers (Republican) 76.4%; ▌Peter F. McManus (Democratic) 22.5%; ▌Andrew L. Bowen (Populist) 1.0%
Vermont 2	William W. Grout	Republican	1880; 1882 (lost); 1884	Incumbent re-elected.	▌ ✓ William W. Grout (Republican) 80.4%; ▌Henry E. Fitzgerald (Democratic) 18.9%; ▌Thomas J. Aldrich (Populist) 0.6%

== Virginia ==
District	Incumbent			This race	
District	Member	Party	First elected	Results	Candidates
Virginia 1	William A. Jones	Democratic	1890	Incumbent re-elected.	▌ ✓ William A. Jones (Democratic) 58.4%; ▌Walter B. Tyler (Republican) 40.5%; Others: ▌Edward J. Winder (Prohibition) 0.8%; ▌Samuel D. Shazier (Socialist Labor) 0.3%
Virginia 2	David G. Tyler	Democratic	1892	Incumbent retired. Democratic hold.	▌ ✓ William A. Young (Democratic) 50.4%; ▌Richard A. Wise (Republican) 42.8%; ▌W. M. Whaley (Democratic) 6.1%; ▌A. B. Griffin (Prohibition) 0.7%
Virginia 2	David G. Tyler	Democratic	1892	Election successfully challenged. Republican gain.	▌ ✓ Richard A. Wise (Republican)
Virginia 3	Tazewell Ellett	Democratic	1894	Incumbent retired. Democratic hold.	▌ ✓ John Lamb (Democratic) 55.5%; ▌L. L. Lewis (Republican) 42.5%; Others: ▌Elisha L. Lewis (Republican) 0.8%; ▌William H. Lewis (Republican) 0.6%; ▌John Mitchell (Republican) 0.3%; ▌James O. Atwood (Prohibition) 0.3%
Virginia 4	Robert Taylor Thorp	Republican	1894 (contest)	Incumbent lost re-election. Democratic gain.	▌ ✓ Sydney P. Epes (Democratic) 54.5%; ▌Robert Taylor Thorp (Republican) 43.4%; ▌J. L. Thorp (Republican) 2.1%
Virginia 4	Robert Taylor Thorp	Republican	1894 (contest)	Election successfully challenged. Republican gain.	▌ ✓ Robert Taylor Thorp (Republican)
Virginia 5	Claude A. Swanson	Democratic	1892	Incumbent re-elected.	▌ ✓ Claude A. Swanson (Democratic) 51.0%; ▌John Robert Brown (Republican) 49.0%
Virginia 6	Peter J. Otey	Democratic	1894	Incumbent re-elected.	▌ ✓ Peter J. Otey (Democratic) 57.0%; ▌Duval Radford (Democratic) 38.7%; ▌J. Hampton Hoge (Republican) 2.8%; ▌Joseph Johnston (Prohibition) 1.5%
Virginia 7	Smith S. Turner	Democratic	1894 (special)	Incumbent retired. Democratic hold.	▌ ✓ James Hay (Democratic) 52.1%; ▌Robert J. Walker (Republican) 42.4%; Others: ▌J. Samuel Harrisberger (Democratic) 1.1%; ▌John F. Forsyth (Independent) 0.7%
Virginia 8	Elisha E. Meredith	Democratic	1891 (special)	Incumbent retired. Democratic hold.	▌ ✓ John Franklin Rixey (Democratic) 56.1%; ▌Peter H. McCaull (Republican) 43.2%; Others: ▌Joseph N. Pancoast (Prohibition) 0.5%; ▌W. C. Colerran (Unknown) 0.2%; ▌James S. Cowdon (Unknown) 0.1%
Virginia 9	James A. Walker	Republican	1892	Incumbent re-elected.	▌ ✓ James A. Walker (Republican) 52.7%; ▌Samuel M. Williams (Democratic) 47.3%
Virginia 10	Henry St. George Tucker	Democratic	1888	Incumbent retired. Republican gain.	▌ ✓ Jacob Yost (Republican) 49.9%; ▌Henry D. Flood (Democratic) 49.8%; ▌C. F. Wanack (Unknown) 0.3%

== Washington ==
District	Incumbent			This race	
District	Member	Party	First elected	Results	Candidates
Washington at-large 2 seats on a general ticket	William H. Doolittle	Republican	1892	Incumbent lost re-election. Democratic gain.	▌ ✓ J. Hamilton Lewis (Fusion) 28.50%; ▌ ✓ William Carey Jones (Fusion) 28.28%; ▌William H. Doolittle (Republican) 21.11%; ▌Samuel C. Hyde (Republican) 20.97%; Others: ▌C. A. Sayler (Prohibition) 0.56%; ▌Martin Olsen (Prohibition) 0.49%; ▌C. E. Mix (National) 0.09%
Washington at-large 2 seats on a general ticket	Samuel C. Hyde	Republican	1894	Incumbent lost re-election. Silver Republican gain.	▌ ✓ J. Hamilton Lewis (Fusion) 28.50%; ▌ ✓ William Carey Jones (Fusion) 28.28%; ▌William H. Doolittle (Republican) 21.11%; ▌Samuel C. Hyde (Republican) 20.97%; Others: ▌C. A. Sayler (Prohibition) 0.56%; ▌Martin Olsen (Prohibition) 0.49%; ▌C. E. Mix (National) 0.09%

== West Virginia ==
District	Incumbent			This race	
District	Member	Party	First elected	Results	Candidates
West Virginia 1	Blackburn B. Dovener	Republican	1894	Incumbent re-elected.	▌ ✓ Blackburn B. Dovener (Republican) 52.69%; ▌W. W. Arnett (Democratic) 46.75%; Others: ▌G. W. Grimes (Independent) 0.42%; ▌Thomas M. Stone (Independent) 0.14%
West Virginia 2	Alston G. Dayton	Republican	1894	Incumbent re-elected.	▌ ✓ Alston G. Dayton (Republican) 52.31%; ▌William S. Wilson (Democratic) 47.69%
West Virginia 3	James H. Huling	Republican	1894	Incumbent retired. Republican hold.	▌ ✓ Charles Dorr (Republican) 53.26%; ▌Emanuel W. Wilson (Democratic) 46.75%
West Virginia 4	Warren Miller	Republican	1894	Incumbent re-elected.	▌ ✓ Warren Miller (Republican) 51.20%; ▌Walter Pendleton (Democratic) 48.80%

== Wisconsin ==
Wisconsin elected ten members of congress on Election Day, November 3, 1896.

District	Incumbent			This race	
District	Member	Party	First elected	Results	Candidates
Wisconsin 1	Henry Allen Cooper	Republican	1892	Incumbent re-elected.	▌ ✓ Henry Allen Cooper (Republican) 64.1%; ▌Jeremiah L. Mahoney (Democratic) 33.4%; ▌George W. White (Prohibition) 2.5%
Wisconsin 2	Edward Sauerhering	Republican	1894	Incumbent re-elected.	▌ ✓ Edward Sauerhering (Republican) 56.5%; ▌William H. Rogers (Democratic) 41.1%; ▌Jesse Meyers (Prohibition) 2.4%
Wisconsin 3	Joseph W. Babcock	Republican	1892	Incumbent re-elected.	▌ ✓ Joseph W. Babcock (Republican) 63.8%; ▌Alfred J. Davis (Democratic) 36.2%
Wisconsin 4	Theobald Otjen	Republican	1894	Incumbent re-elected.	▌ ✓ Theobald Otjen (Republican) 54.2%; ▌Robert C. Schilling (Democratic) 44.9%; ▌Robert May (Prohibition) 0.9%
Wisconsin 5	Samuel S. Barney	Republican	1894	Incumbent re-elected.	▌ ✓ Samuel S. Barney (Republican) 61.0%; ▌George W. Winans (Democratic) 37.8%; ▌Henry Mensing (Socialist Labor) 1.3%
Wisconsin 6	Samuel A. Cook	Republican	1894	Incumbent declined re-nomination. Republican hold.	▌ ✓ James H. Davidson (Republican) 57.7%; ▌William F. Gruenewald (Democratic) 41.0%; ▌James E. Thompson (Prohibition) 1.4%
Wisconsin 7	Michael Griffin	Republican	1894	Incumbent re-elected.	▌ ✓ Michael Griffin (Republican) 65.8%; ▌Caleb M. Hilliard (Democratic) 32.0%; ▌James H. Moseley (Prohibition) 2.2%
Wisconsin 8	Edward S. Minor	Republican	1894	Incumbent re-elected.	▌ ✓ Edward S. Minor (Republican) 60.3%; ▌George W. Cate (Democratic) 38.4%; ▌John W. Evans (Prohibition) 1.3%
Wisconsin 9	Alexander Stewart	Republican	1894	Incumbent re-elected.	▌ ✓ Alexander Stewart (Republican) 63.2%; ▌William W. O'Keefe (Democratic) 36.8%
Wisconsin 10	John J. Jenkins	Republican	1894	Incumbent re-elected.	▌ ✓ John J. Jenkins (Republican) 65.5%; ▌Frederick H. Remington (Democratic) 34.5%

== Wyoming ==
District	Incumbent			This race	
District	Member	Party	First elected	Results	Candidates
Wyoming at-large	Frank W. Mondell	Republican	1894	Incumbent lost re-election. Democratic gain.	▌ ✓ John E. Osborne (Democratic) 49.14%; ▌Frank W. Mondell (Republican) 47.87%; ▌William Brown (Populist) 2.99%

== Non-voting delegates ==
=== Oklahoma Territory ===
District	Incumbent			This race	
District	Delegate	Party	First elected	Results	Candidates
Oklahoma Territory at-large	Dennis T. Flynn	Republican	1892	Incumbent lost re-election. Silver gain.	▌ ✓ James Y. Callahan (Silver) 51.09%; ▌Dennis T. Flynn (Republican) 48.91%

== See also ==
- 1896 United States elections
  - 1896 United States presidential election
  - 1896–97 United States Senate elections
- 54th United States Congress
- 55th United States Congress

== Bibliography ==
- Dubin, Michael J. (March 1, 1998). United States Congressional Elections, 1788-1997: The Official Results of the Elections of the 1st Through 105th Congresses. McFarland and Company. ISBN 978-0786402830.
- Martis, Kenneth C. (January 1, 1989). The Historical Atlas of Political Parties in the United States Congress, 1789-1989. Macmillan Publishing Company. ISBN 978-0029201701.
- Moore, John L., ed. (1994). Congressional Quarterly's Guide to U.S. Elections (Third ed.). Congressional Quarterly Inc. ISBN 978-0871879967.
- "Party Divisions of the House of Representatives* 1789–Present". Office of the Historian, House of United States House of Representatives.
