= 1894 United States House of Representatives elections in South Carolina =

The 1894 United States House of representatives elections in South Carolina were held on November 6th, 1894 The Democratic party won all of the seats in South Carolina that were up for election. The winners of this would go on to form the 54th United States Congress.

== 1st congressional district special election ==
Incumbent Democratic Congressman William H. Brawley of the 1st congressional district, in office since 1891, resigned in 1894. A special election was called for April and it pitted two Democrats against each other because the South Carolina Democratic Party refused to organize a primary election. James F. Izlar defeated J. William Stokes in the special election to win the remainder of the term for the 53rd Congress.

=== General election results ===
South Carolina's 1st congressional district special election results, 1894
| Party | Candidate | Votes | % | ±% |
|---|---|---|---|---|
| Democratic | James F. Izlar | 3,070 | 60.1 | N/A |
| Democratic | J. William Stokes | 2,042 | 39.9 | N/A |
| Majority | | 1,028 | 20.2 | N/A |
| Turnout | | 5,112 | | |
| Democratic hold | | | | |

== 1st congressional district ==
The 1st congressional district was redrawn in 1894 to cover much of the South Carolina Lowcountry. William Elliott defeated D.A.J. Sullivan in the Democratic primary and Republican challenger George W. Murray in the general election. However, Murray challenged the election and the Republican controlled Congress awarded him the seat from Elliott in 1896.

=== Democratic primary ===
Democratic primary
| Candidate | Votes | % |
|---|---|---|
| William Elliott | 2,937 | 62.1 |
| D.A.J. Sullivan | 1,789 | 37.9 |

=== General election results ===
South Carolina's 1st congressional district election results, 1894
| Party | Candidate | Votes | % | ±% |
|---|---|---|---|---|
| Democratic | William Elliott | 5,650 | 59.1 | −40.5 |
| Republican | George W. Murray | 3,913 | 40.9 | +40.9 |
| Majority | | 1,737 | 18.2 | −81.4 |
| Turnout | | 9,563 | | |
| Democratic hold | | | | |

== 2nd congressional district ==
Incumbent Democratic Congressman W. Jasper Talbert of the 2nd congressional district, in office since 1893, was unopposed in his bid for re-election.

=== General election results ===
South Carolina's 2nd congressional district election results, 1894
| Party | Candidate | Votes | % | ±% |
|---|---|---|---|---|
| Democratic | W. Jasper Talbert (incumbent) | 5,942 | 99.5 | −0.1 |
| No party | Write-Ins | 31 | 0.5 | +0.1 |
| Majority | | 5,911 | 99.0 | −0.2 |
| Turnout | | 5,973 | | |
| Democratic hold | | | | |

== 3rd congressional district ==
Incumbent Democratic Congressman Asbury Latimer of the 3rd congressional district, in office since 1893, defeated Republican Robert Moorman in the general election.

=== General election results ===
South Carolina's 3rd congressional district election results, 1894
| Party | Candidate | Votes | % | ±% |
|---|---|---|---|---|
| Democratic | Asbury Latimer (incumbent) | 5,778 | 81.3 | −9.9 |
| Republican | Robert Moorman | 985 | 13.9 | +5.3 |
| No party | Write-Ins | 342 | 4.8 | +4.6 |
| Majority | | 4,793 | 67.4 | −15.2 |
| Turnout | | 7,105 | | |
| Democratic hold | | | | |

== 4th congressional district ==
Incumbent Democratic Congressman George W. Shell of the 4th congressional district, in office since 1891, declined to seek re-election. Stanyarne Wilson won the Democratic primary and defeated Republican Lawson D. Melton in the general election.

=== Democratic primary ===
Democratic primary
| Candidate | Votes | % |
|---|---|---|
| Stanyarne Wilson | 6,903 | 56.4 |
| Joseph T. Johnson | 3,628 | 29.7 |
| David Duncan | 1,696 | 13.9 |

=== General election results ===
South Carolina's 4th congressional district election results, 1894
| Party | Candidate | Votes | % | ±% |
|---|---|---|---|---|
| Democratic | Stanyarne Wilson | 8,425 | 75.1 | −10.6 |
| Republican | Lawson D. Melton | 2,771 | 24.7 | +10.4 |
| No party | Write-Ins | 28 | 0.2 | +0.2 |
| Majority | | 5,654 | 50.4 | −21.0 |
| Turnout | | 11,224 | | |
| Democratic hold | | | | |

== 5th congressional district ==
Incumbent Democratic Congressman Thomas J. Strait of the 5th congressional district, in office since 1893, defeated David E. Finley in the Democratic primary and Republican G.G. Alexander in the general election.

=== Democratic primary ===
Democratic primary
| Candidate | Votes | % |
|---|---|---|
| Thomas J. Strait | 5,442 | 67.2 |
| David E. Finley | 2,655 | 32.8 |

=== General election results ===
South Carolina's 5th congressional district election results, 1894
| Party | Candidate | Votes | % | ±% |
|---|---|---|---|---|
| Democratic | Thomas J. Strait (incumbent) | 6,141 | 67.6 | −13.1 |
| Republican | G.G. Alexander | 1,545 | 17.0 | −2.3 |
| Independent | W.R. Davie | 1,163 | 12.8 | +12.8 |
| No party | Write-Ins | 237 | 2.6 | +2.6 |
| Majority | | 4,596 | 50.6 | −10.8 |
| Turnout | | 9,086 | | |
| Democratic hold | | | | |

== 6th congressional district ==
Incumbent Democratic Congressman John L. McLaurin of the 6th congressional district, in office since 1893, defeated Republican challenger J.P. Wilson.

=== General election results ===
South Carolina's 6th congressional district election results, 1894
| Party | Candidate | Votes | % | ±% |
|---|---|---|---|---|
| Democratic | John L. McLaurin (incumbent) | 8,171 | 76.9 | −7.7 |
| Republican | J.P. Wilson | 2,452 | 23.1 | +7.8 |
| No party | Write-Ins | 7 | 0.0 | −0.1 |
| Majority | | 5,719 | 53.8 | −15.5 |
| Turnout | | 10,630 | | |
| Democratic hold | | | | |

== 7th congressional district ==
The 7th congressional district was redrawn in 1894 to include much of the lower central part of the state. J. William Stokes was nominated by the Democrats and defeated Republican T.B. Johnson in the general election.

=== General election results ===
South Carolina's 7th congressional district election results, 1894
| Party | Candidate | Votes | % | ±% |
|---|---|---|---|---|
| Democratic | J. William Stokes | 7,358 | 73.0 | +23.4 |
| Republican | T.B. Johnson | 2,656 | 26.3 | −23.7 |
| No party | Write-Ins | 70 | 0.7 | +0.3 |
| Majority | | 4,702 | 46.7 | +46.3 |
| Turnout | | 10,084 | | |
| Democratic gain from Republican | | | | |

== See also ==
- United States House of Representatives elections, 1894
- South Carolina gubernatorial election, 1894
- South Carolina's congressional districts
