= William H. Perry (South Carolina politician) =

American politician

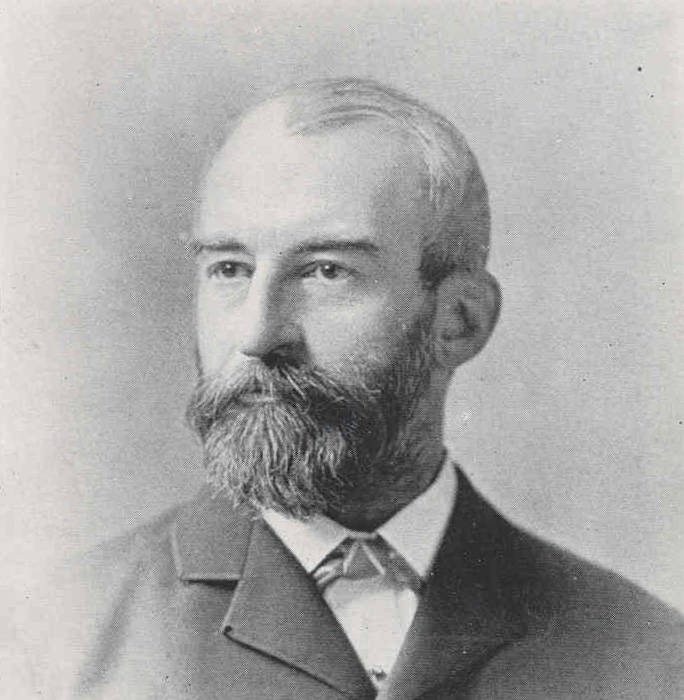

Member of the U.S. House of Representatives from South Carolina's 4th district
- In office March 4, 1885 – March 3, 1891
- Preceded by: John Bratton
- Succeeded by: George W. Shell

Member of the South Carolina Senate from Greenville County
- In office November 23, 1880 – November 25, 1884
- Preceded by: Stephen Stanley Crittenden
- Succeeded by: William Lawrence Mauldin

Member of the South Carolina House of Representatives from Greenville County
- In office November 27, 1865 – December 21, 1866

Personal details
- Born: June 9, 1839 Greenville, South Carolina, U.S.
- Died: July 7, 1902 (aged 63) Greenville, South Carolina, U.S.
- Resting place: Christ Church (Greenville, South Carolina)
- Party: Democratic
- Spouse: Louise Bankhead
- Education: Furman University; South Carolina College; Harvard University
- Profession: Attorney

Military service
- Allegiance: Confederate States of America
- Branch/service: Confederate States Army
- Rank: First Lieutenant
- Unit: Confederate cavalry
- Battles/wars: American Civil War

William Hayne Perry (June 9, 1839 – July 7, 1902) was a United States representative from South Carolina. He was born in Greenville, South Carolina, where he attended Greenville Academy, and graduated from Furman University at Greenville in 1857. He also attended South Carolina College (now the University of South Carolina) at Columbia, South Carolina and graduated from Harvard University in 1859. Later, he studied law in Greenville and was admitted to the bar in 1861 and commenced practice in Greenville.

Perry served as a private and subsequently as lieutenant in the Confederate Cavalry during the American Civil War. He resumed the practice of law in Greenville in 1865. He served as a member of the State constitutional convention in 1865 and a member of the South Carolina House of Representatives in 1865 and 1866. He was the solicitor of the eighth judicial circuit of South Carolina from 1868 to 1872 and served in the South Carolina Senate from 1880 to 1884.

Perry was elected as a Democrat to the Forty-ninth, Fiftieth, and Fifty-first Congresses (March 4, 1885 – March 3, 1891). He declined to be a candidate for renomination in 1890. After leaving Congress, he resumed the practice of law. He died at his home, "San Souci," near Greenville, in 1902 and was buried in Christ Church Cemetery, Greenville, South Carolina.

== Family ==
He was the son of Benjamin Franklin Perry (November 20, 1805 – December 3, 1886) and Elizabeth Frances McCall. In 1888, he married Louise Bankhead, daughter of Congressman and later U.S. Senator John H. Bankhead.

U.S. House of Representatives
Preceded by John Bratton	Member of the U.S. House of Representatives from South Carolina's 4th congressional district 1885 – 1891	Succeeded by George W. Shell
