= Christ Church (Greenville, South Carolina) =

Historic church in South Carolina, United States

Christ Church (Episcopal) and Churchyard
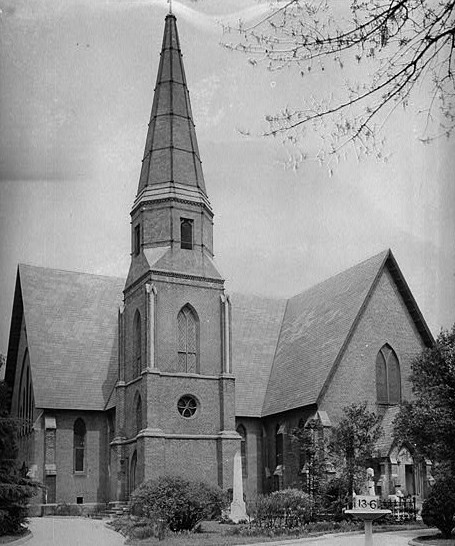
- Christ Church Episcopal in 1934

Religion
- Affiliation: Episcopal Church in the United States of America
- District: Episcopal Diocese of Upper South Carolina
- Leadership: Harrison McLeod, Rector
- Year consecrated: 1854
- Status: active

Location
- Location: 10 N. Church St., Greenville, South Carolina
- State: South Carolina
- Interactive map of Christ Church (Episcopal) and Churchyard
- Coordinates: 34°51′3″N 82°23′40″W

Architecture
- Architects: McCullough, Rev. John Dewitt
- Type: Church
- Style: Gothic Revival
- Groundbreaking: 1852
- Completed: 1854 (current church building)

Specifications
- Length: 109 ft (33 m)
- Width: 96 ft (29 m)
- Width (nave): 39 ft (12 m)
- Height (max): 65 ft (20 m)
- Spire: 1
- Spire height: 104.67 ft (31.9 m)
- Materials: Brick with stone and stucco trim

U.S. National Register of Historic Places
- Added to NRHP: May 06, 1971
- NRHP Reference no.: 71000784

Website
- http://www.ccgsc.org/

Christ Church (Episcopal) is an Episcopal church in Greenville, South Carolina, United States. which was consecrated in 1854. The church and its courtyard are listed on the National Register of Historic Places as Christ Church (Episcopal) and Churchyard. It is the oldest organized religious body and the oldest church building remaining in Greenville.

== History ==
In March, 1820, Reverend Rodolphus Dickerson founded St. James Mission in the village of Greenville Court House. In 1825, Vardry McBee, who was an early industrialist in Greenville, gave 4 acres (1.6 ha) for the church. The cornerstone was laid on September 15, 1825. The brick church was 55 ft (17 m) long and 30 ft (9 m) wide. The first service was held on June 18, 1826. The church was accepted into the Episcopal Diocese of South Carolina as Christ Church Parish.

In 1845, the parish proposed the building of a new church. Joel Poinsett, who was a vestryman of the church, drew up plans. Since these were felt to too elaborate and unaffordable, construction was delayed and Poinsett died. Rev. John D. McCollough, who had designed and built over a dozen churches in upstate South Carolina, drew the final plans and built the church. The cornerstone was laid on May 29, 1852. It contained religious books, church and diocesan publications in a sealed copper box.

The nave of the brick Gothic church was originally 80 ft (24 m) long and 39 ft (12 m) wide. There were five lancet windows on each side. The west end had five narrow stained glass windows, which has been described as a "pentaphlet," and an art glass circular window depicting the Holy Trinity. The chancel had a triplet window in the chancel depicting Christ, St. John, and St. Peter. The peaked ceiling was 65 ft (20 m) tall. Although several sources, quoting an 1856 article in the Southern Episcopalian, say that the brick bell tower is 130 ft (40 m) tall, the 1934 architectural drawings indicate that is 104.67 ft (31.9 m) tall from the top of the foundation to the base of its cross. The church was consecrated on September 29, 1854.

A balcony was added in 1875. The south transept was constructed in 1880. In 1914, the triplex window in the chancel was replaced with a stained glass window of the Last Supper from Franz Mayer & Co. in Munich This window was dedicated to Ellison Capers, who was a Confederate general, rector in 1866 to 1888, and Bishop of the Diocese of South Carolina. In 1968, the north transept was built to complete the Gothic cruciform design, and an undercroft was added. In 2000, the balcony was enlarged and a 68-rank Goulding and Wood organ was installed.

The Historic American Buildings Survey documented the church with photographs and measured drawings in 1934. The drawings include a site plan and drawings of various details of the church.

Christ Church is now in the Episcopal Diocese of Upper South Carolina. It sponsors Christ Church Episcopal School in Greenville.

== Churchyard ==
The churchyard has a cemetery. In addition to Vardry McBee, clergy, church members, and former mayors, three politicians are interred: the post-Civil War provisional Governor Benjamin Franklin Perry, his son, U.S. Congressman William H. Perry, and U.S. Senator Joseph H. Earle.
