= George W. Shell =

American politician

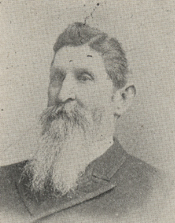

Member of the U.S. House of Representatives from South Carolina's 4th district
- In office March 4, 1891 – March 3, 1895
- Preceded by: William H. Perry
- Succeeded by: Stanyarne Wilson

Personal details
- Born: George Washington Shell; November 13, 1831 Laurens County, South Carolina, U.S.
- Died: December 15, 1899 (aged 68) Laurens County, South Carolina, U.S.
- Party: Democratic

Military service
- Allegiance: Confederate States of America
- Branch/service: Confederate States Army
- Years of service: 1861 – 1865
- Rank: Captain
- Unit: 3rd Regiment; South Carolina Volunteers; Company A
- Battles/wars: American Civil War

George Washington Shell (November 13, 1831 – December 15, 1899) was a U.S. representative from South Carolina.

== Life ==
Born near Laurens, South Carolina, Shell attended the common schools and Laurens Academy. He engaged in agricultural pursuits. He entered the Confederate States Army as a private in April 1861 and served throughout the Civil War, attaining the rank of captain. He resumed agricultural pursuits.

In 1875, he and his brother were charged with the assassination of politician Joseph Crews; a jury acquitted them both after a half-hour of deliberation.

He served as member of the State Democratic executive committee in 1886 and 1887. Chosen president of the State Farmers' Association in 1888. He served as clerk of court of Laurens County 1888-1896.

Shell was elected as a Democrat to the Fifty-second and Fifty-third Congresses (March 4, 1891 – March 3, 1895). He served as chairman of the Committee on Ventilation and Acoustics (Fifty-third Congress). He was not a candidate for renomination in 1894. He retired to his plantation near Laurens, South Carolina, and died there December 15, 1899. He was interred in Chestnut Ridge Cemetery.

== Sources ==
- United States Congress. "George W. Shell (id: S000324)". Biographical Directory of the United States Congress.

U.S. House of Representatives
Preceded by William H. Perry	Member of the U.S. House of Representatives from South Carolina's 4th congressional district 1891 – 1895	Succeeded by Stanyarne Wilson
