= Lafayette Holbrook =

American mayor

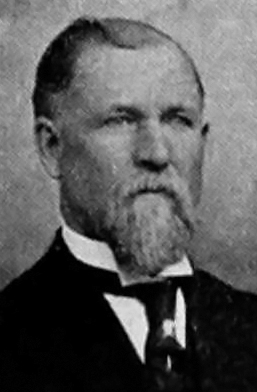
LaFayette Holbrook 1922

Lafayette Holbrook (September 7, 1850 – January 1, 1941) was mayor of Provo, Utah, from 1894 to 1897 and an unsuccessful candidate for the United States House of Representatives in 1896.

Holbrook was born in Salt Lake City in the Provisional State of Deseret, just two days before Utah Territory was created. A year after his birth his father, Chandler Holbrook, helped found Fillmore, Utah, and that is where Holbrook was raised. He was a nephew of Utah politician Joseph Holbrook. Holbrook attended the University of Deseret, the predecessor of the University of Utah. He was for many years involved in the ranching business, bringing cattle and pigs from Texas and Kansas to Utah.

From 1873 to 1875, Holbrook served as an LDS missionary in England. In 1876, he married Emily Angeline Hinckley, a daughter of Ira N. Hinckley. In later years, Holbrook was involved in mercantile activities in Frisco and Logan, Utah, and was an owner of mining companies in the Tintic Region along the Utah County–Juab County line and in the Detroit Mining District in Millard County, Utah.

In 1896, Holbrook was the unsuccessful Republican candidate for United States House of Representatives from Utah. In 1901, he became a counselor in the presidency of the Utah Stake of the Church of Jesus Christ of Latter-day Saints.
