= Stanyarne Wilson =

American politician

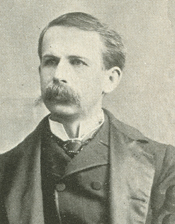

Member of the U.S. House of Representatives from South Carolina's 4th district
- In office March 4, 1895 – March 3, 1901
- Preceded by: George W. Shell
- Succeeded by: Joseph T. Johnson

Member of the South Carolina Senate from Spartanburg County
- In office November 22, 1892 – March 3, 1895
- Preceded by: Robert Marion Smith
- Succeeded by: Edgar Lycurgus Archer

Member of the South Carolina House of Representatives from Spartanburg County
- In office November 25, 1890 – November 22, 1892
- In office November 25, 1884 – November 23, 1886

Personal details
- Born: January 10, 1860 Yorkville, South Carolina, U.S.
- Died: February 14, 1928 (aged 68) Spartanburg, South Carolina, U.S.
- Party: Democratic
- Education: King's Mountain Military School; Washington and Lee University
- Occupation: lawyer

Stanyarne Wilson (January 10, 1860 – February 14, 1928) was a U.S. representative from South Carolina.

Born in Yorkville (now York), South Carolina, Wilson attended King's Mountain Military School and Washington and Lee University, Lexington, Virginia. He studied law. He was admitted to the bar by an act of the legislature in 1880, then being a minor. He settled in Spartanburg, South Carolina, in 1881. Practiced law and was also interested in cotton manufactures, gold mining, iron works, and agriculture. He served as member of the State house of representatives 1884–1886 and 1890–1892. He served in the State senate 1892–1895. He served as member of the State constitutional convention in 1895.

Wilson was elected as a Democrat to the Fifty-fourth, Fifty-fifth, and Fifty-sixth Congresses (March 4, 1895 – March 3, 1901). He continued the practice of law in Spartanburg, South Carolina, and later in Richmond, Virginia, where he moved in 1913. He returned to Spartanburg, South Carolina, in January 1928, and died there February 14, 1928. He was interred in Church of the Advent Cemetery.

== Sources ==
- United States Congress. "Stanyarne Wilson (id: W000612)". Biographical Directory of the United States Congress.

U.S. House of Representatives
Preceded by George W. Shell	Member of the U.S. House of Representatives from South Carolina's 4th congressional district 1895–1901	Succeeded by Joseph T. Johnson
