= Martha Pearson Smith =

American poet

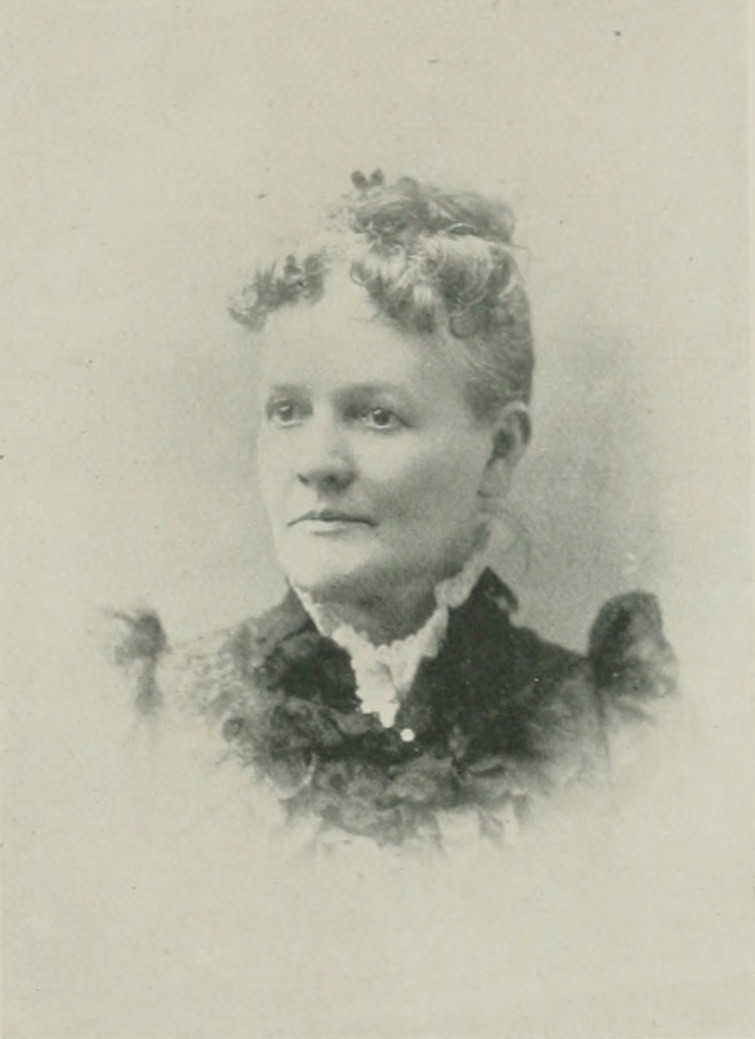
- Photo in A Woman of the Century
- Born: Martha Ann Pearson; September 29, 1836; North Conway, New Hampshire, U.S.
- Died: 1912 (aged 75–76); Spokane, Washington
- Other name: "Mattie"
- Occupations: poet; musician; songwriter
- Spouse: Edson Rollins Smith (m. 1859; died 1900)
- Children: 3 sons
- Writing career
- Pen name: Mattie May; Mattie; May

Martha Pearson Smith (pen names, Mattie May, May, Mattie; September 29, 1836 - 1912) was an American poet and musician of the long nineteenth century. She made significant contributions in secular and sacred verse. One of her best songs was "Jennie and I", which was set to music by Prof. T. M. Towne. She was a champion of the cause of temperance and did much to advance the movement in Minnesota.

== Early life and education ==
Martha ("Mattie") Ann Pearson was born in North Conway, New Hampshire, September 29, 1836. Her parents were John Milton Pearon (1810-1887) and Laura Abigail (Emery) Pearson (1815-1853). Her paternal grandmother was related to Nathaniel Hawthorne. Her ancestry runs back to the Smithfield martyr. Her ancestors included the Gilmans, who came from England in the ship Diligent, in 1638, and settled in Hingham, Massachusetts. Many of the most noted men and women of New England were members of her family in past generations.

Her early life was passed amid the quiet and healthful scenes of the White Mountains. Her family removed to Meredith, New Hampshire, and when she was seven years old, they made their home in Boston, Massachusetts, for four years, where she studied. Her mother, who had been a successful teacher, personally superintended the education of her family. The young Martha was able to read when she was only four years old, and before she was seven years old had read Milton's Paradise Lost, Hervey's Meditations and other classical works.

The Pearson family for generations had been a musical one. Her grandfather, John Pearson, was a singer and composer of both words and music that were sung in the Congregational Church in Newburyport, Massachusetts. He was a fine performer on several instruments, and from him, Martha inherited her strong love and talent for music. She studied music and even ventured to compose airs, when she was six years old. Among her published songs are "Under the Lilies Sleeping" and "Go, Forget Me." She had many musical compositions in manuscript, and some of her temperance songs are published in the temperance section of Woman in Sacred Song. Some of her verses were set to music by Prof. Towne.

When she was yet a child, her family moved to Cincinnati, Ohio, and afterward to Covington, Kentucky, where she attended school for a number of years. Her teacher trained her in composition, for which she early showed a strong talent. She attended a young ladies' seminary in Covington, and at the age of sixteen years published in the local papers several serial stories over the pen name "Mattie May". Some of her poems appeared when she was eleven years old. At the age of ten, she began to write a book founded on the Maine Liquor Law.

During the cholera epidemic in Covington, she was mildly sick, and her parents, imagining her a victim of the disease, hurried her to bed, bathed her head, and instructed her to keep quiet. Shortly after, her mother entered her room and was amazed to see Martha sitting up in bed, with flushed face, writing as fast as she could a poem entitled "The Song of the Pestilence", which she was not allowed to finish.

== Career ==
For a number of years, she taught school in Kentucky. She lived in the state until 1857, when she removed to Minnesota.

Smith was engaged in charitable work. Her first years in Minnesota were troublesome ones, as the Dakota people were warring with the pioneers. Smith and her children were sent to Vermont for some months, until the warring ended. She was a voluminous writer, but most of her best work was never published. She became a professional partner of Eva Munson Smith, supporting the sale of the latter's book, Woman in Sacred Song.

== Personal life ==
On November 3, 1859, she married Edson Rollins Smith (1836-1900), a banker and mill-owner, of Le Sueur, Minnesota, who served as a state senator. Their family consisted of three sons:

- Louis Orville Smith (1860–1907)
- Rollin Edson Smith (1862–1931)
- Frederick Pearson Smith (1867–1909)

Martha Ann Pearson Smith died in Spokane, Washington, 1912.

== Selected works ==
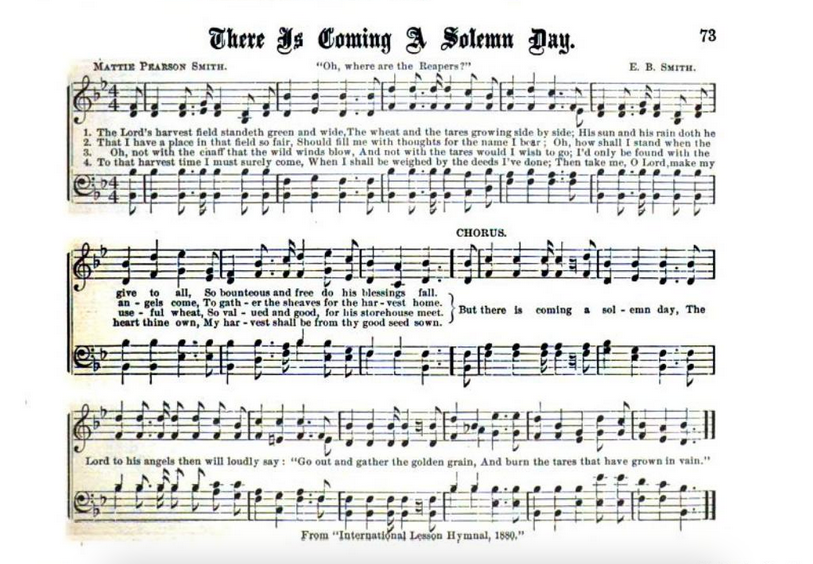
"There Is Coming A Solemn Day" (1880)

=== Lyrics ===
Sources:

- "A child's psalm"
- "Always ready"
- "Captain 'No'"
- "Entire consecration"
- "Invocation"
- "Is rum to be king?"
- "Little children, pray"
- "Pray without easing"
- "When we are old enough to vote"
- "Why?"
- "Beautiful Star of Bethlehem"
- "Come, Join the Famous Army"
- "Go Forth, Go Forth to Battle"
- "In the Morning Early"
- "The Last Command"
- "The Lord’s Harvest Field Standeth"
- "O Glorious Land"
- "Ready, Savior, I Would Be"
- "The Tempter Watcheth Every Hour"
- "Though I Am a Little Child"
- "When Little Children Let Sinful Thoughts Glow"
