= Spencer Hays =

American businessman and art collector

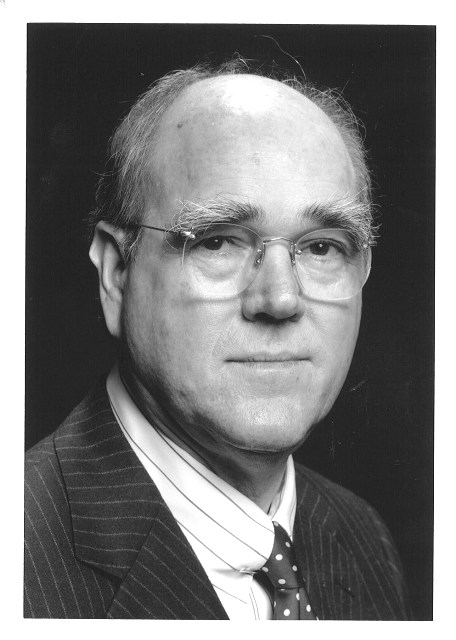
- Born: July 14, 1936; Ardmore, Oklahoma, U.S.
- Died: March 1, 2017 (aged 80); New York City, U.S.
- Education: Texas Christian University
- Occupations: Businessman, art collector
- Spouse: Marlene Hays

Spencer Hays (July 14, 1936 – March 1, 2017) was an American businessman and art collector. He was the majority owner and chairman of the executive committee of Southwestern family of companies. With his wife, he made the largest foreign donation to the Musée d'Orsay since its opening in 1986.

== Early life ==
Spencer Hays was born in Ardmore, Oklahoma. He grew up in Gainesville, Texas.

Hays played basketball in high school. He attended Texas Christian University on a basketball scholarship.

== Career ==
As a student at TCU, Hays started his career with Southwestern Advantage in 1956. He became vice president of sales in 1966, executive vice president in 1971, and president in 1973. As Southwestern Advantage expanded into Southwestern Family of Companies, Hays became the chairman of its executive committee starting in 1983. He was the majority owner of Southwestern Family of Companies until the time of his death.

Additionally, Hays founded Tom James Co., a fine clothing firm, in 1966. He purchased Oxxford Clothes, high-end men's suit and sport coat manufacturer, in 1994. He was the owner of Athlon Sports Communications, a publisher of sports manuals.

Hays was inducted into the hall of fame of the Direct Selling Association in 1983.

== Art collection and philanthropy ==
With his wife, Hays began collecting American art in the 1970s. By the 1980s, they began collecting French art, especially Les Nabis.

Hays and his wife co-founded the American Friends of the Musée d'Orsay in 2013. Hays served on its board of directors. In 2016, the couple donated 187 paintings worth £155 million to the museum. After their death, their donation will come up to 600 paintings worth £315 million. The donation includes paintings by Pierre Bonnard, Édouard Vuillard, Maurice Denis, Odilon Redon, Edgar Degas, Gustave Caillebotte, Camille Corot, Aristide Maillol, Amedeo Modigliani and Albert Marquet. It was the largest foreign bequest to the museum since its opening in 1986. As a result, French president François Hollande thanked them for it and made them Commanders of the Legion of Honour.

On July 10, 2019, a second donation of 106 pièces of art (40 paintings, 47 drawings and 19 sculptures) of Bonnard, Vuillard, Maurice Denis, Félix Vallotton, Georges Lacombe, Édouard Manet, Émile Bernard, Camille Claudel, Odilon Redon, Robert Delaunay, Henri Matisse or Modigliani was given by Marlene Spencer to the Musée d'Orsay.

Hays donated $2 million to his alma mater, Texas Christian University. He previously served on its board of trustees.

== Personal life and death ==
Hays met his wife, Marlene, at 14; they married when he was 19. They resided in a mansion modeled after the Hôtel de Noirmoutier in Nashville, Tennessee. They also owned an apartment in Manhattan, New York City.

Hays died on March 1, 2017, at age 80.
