= Charles Dick Medal of Merit =

The Charles Dick Medal of Merit is awarded by the National Guard Association of the United States to elected officials in recognition of their contributions toward the National Guard. It was established in 1988 and named in honor Charles Dick, a major general from the Ohio National Guard.
