= Charles W. F. Dick =

American politician (1858–1945)

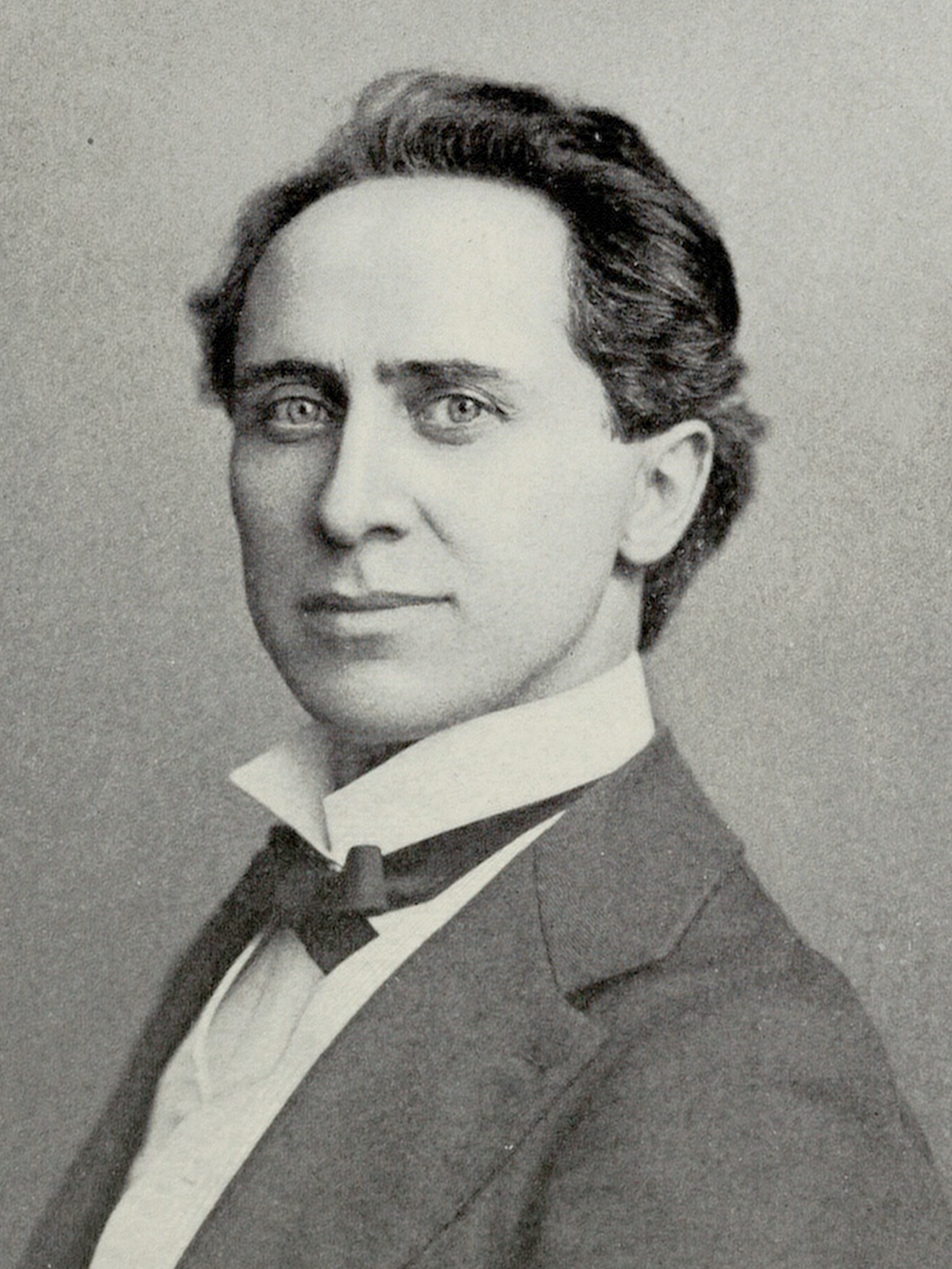

United States Senator from Ohio
- In office March 23, 1904 – March 3, 1911
- Preceded by: Marcus A. Hanna
- Succeeded by: Atlee Pomerene

Member of the U.S. House of Representatives from Ohio's 19th district
- In office November 8, 1898 – March 23, 1904
- Preceded by: Stephen A. Northway
- Succeeded by: W. Aubrey Thomas

Personal details
- Born: November 3, 1858 Akron, Ohio, U.S.
- Died: March 13, 1945 (aged 86) Akron, Ohio, U.S.
- Party: Republican
- Spouse: Carrie M. Peterson
- Children: 5

Charles William Frederick Dick (November 3, 1858 – March 13, 1945) was a Republican politician from Ohio. He served in the United States House of Representatives and U.S. Senate.

== Early life ==
Born in Akron, Ohio, his parents were Gottlieb Dick (a Scots/German immigrant), and Magdalena or "Lena" (Von Handel) Dick, who immigrated to the United States from Heidelberg, Germany. On June 30, 1881, Dick married Carrie May Peterson, the daughter of Dr. James Holman Peterson and Caroline Van Evera. They had five children: James, Lucius, Carl, Grace (Mrs. Edgar Williams) and Dorothy (Mrs. William Robinson). Dick was a Scottish Rite Mason, Odd Fellow, and Knight of Pythias.

== Career ==
=== Early career ===
"Charley" Dick was educated in Akron, and worked at several stores and banks. In 1886, he was the successful Republican nominee for Summit County auditor, and he was re-elected in 1888. He also read law, and was admitted to the bar in 1894. Dick was a delegate to the 1892, 1896 and 1900 Republican National Conventions. He was elected Chairman of the Ohio Republican Party in 1887 and 1891, and served as the Secretary of the Republican National Committee from 1896 to 1900.

=== Military career ===
In November 1885 Dick joined the Ohio Army National Guard as a private in Company B, 8th Ohio Infantry Regiment, and he was commissioned as a first lieutenant a few days later. His regiment volunteered for service in the Spanish–American War, and Dick served in Cuba as a major and lieutenant colonel. He continued his military service after the war, and attained the rank of major general as head of the Ohio National Guard. From 1902 to 1909 he was president of the National Guard Association of the United States.

=== Congressional career ===
He was elected to the United States House of Representatives by a special election in 1898 to fill a vacancy created by the death of Stephen A. Northway, serving the 19th district.

Dick was Chairman of the Militia Committee, and sponsored the Militia Act of 1903 (the Dick Act). This act codified the circumstances under which the National Guard in each state could be federalized, provided federal resources for equipping and training the National Guard, and required National Guard units to organize and meet the same readiness requirements as the regular Army.

Dick served until he resigned in 1904, having been elected to the Senate to fill the vacancy created by the death of Marcus A. Hanna.

In the Senate he served as chairman of the Mining Committee and the Committee on Indian Depredations. He also was the head of a Congressional Committee which investigated hazing at the United States Military Academy. He served until 1911, when he lost a bid for a second term.

While in Congress, he became one of the largest stockholders in the Goodyear Tire and Rubber Company, and served as a vice president and member of the board of directors.

=== Later career ===
Dick practiced law after leaving the Senate, and pursued a successful business career, including ownership of the Franklin Square Hotel in Washington, D.C., and the Hotel Chatham in New York City.

He ran unsuccessfully for the U.S. House in 1918, losing to Martin L. Davey. In 1922 he was an unsuccessful candidate for the Republican U.S. Senate nomination, losing to Simeon D. Fess.

== Retirement, death and burial ==
From 1941 until his death in Akron on March 13, 1945, Dick was the oldest living former US Senator. He was buried in Akron's Glendale Cemetery.

== Legacy ==
Since 1988 the National Guard Association of the United States presents the annual Charles Dick Medal of Merit to recognize support for the National Guard by state and federal legislators.

U.S. House of Representatives
Preceded by Stephen A. Northway	Member of the U.S. House of Representatives from Ohio's 19th congressional district November 8, 1898 – March 23, 1904	Succeeded by W. Aubrey Thomas
U.S. Senate
Preceded by Marcus A. Hanna	U.S. senator (Class 1) from Ohio; March 23, 1904 – March 3, 1911; Served alongside: Joseph B. Foraker, Theodore E. Burton	Succeeded by Atlee Pomerene
Honorary titles
Preceded by Reed Smoot	Most senior living U.S. senator (Sitting or former); February 9, 1941 – March 13, 1945	Succeeded by Norris Brown
Party political offices
Preceded by	Secretary of the Republican National Committee; 1896–1900	Succeeded by Perry S. Heath
