= Z. C. Graves =

American Baptist preacher and educator

Zuinglius Calvin Graves Jr. (April 5, 1816 – May 18, 1902) was an American Baptist preacher and educator. He is most noted as the first President of the Mary Sharp College (1851–1896), located at Winchester, Tennessee. It was the first women's college in the United States to offer degrees equivalent to the degrees offered at men's colleges – preceding Vassar College by ten years.

== Personal life and family ==
Graves was born in Chester, Windsor County, Vermont, the son of Zuinglius Calvin Graves and Lois Snell. He was the older brother of influential 19th-century Baptist preacher James Robinson Graves. About 1838 he removed to Ashtabula County, Ohio, where he taught at the Kingsville Academy twelve years. There in Ashtabula, he met and married Adelia Cleopatra Spencer in 1841. She was the daughter of Dr. and Mrs. Daniel Spencer, and a niece of the noted calligrapher and penman Platt Rogers Spencer.

Z. C. and Adelia Graves had four known children: James R., Florence M., Zuinglius Dickinson, and Hubert A. He died on May 18, 1902. His remains are interred in the Winchester City Cemetery in Winchester, Franklin County, Tennessee.

== Work ==
After the Mary Sharp College was chartered in 1848 (as the Tennessee Female Institute), trustees hired Z. C. Graves to lead the new effort. The school opened January 1, 1851, with Graves as the President and his wife Adelia as the Matron. "The Mary Sharp College under Dr. Graves’ presidency acquired a national reputation, and he avers that its success was owing quite as much to her wise counsels and management as to his own efforts."

According to the Tennessee Encyclopedia of History and Culture, "Graves...patterned the classical curriculum at Mary Sharp College after those offered at Amherst College, Brown University, and the University of Virginia. He emphasized religious and moral training and required every student to attend chapel. Students at Mary Sharp, unlike those at other female colleges and academies, studied algebra, geometry, and trigonometry; Latin and Greek; English literature, grammar, and composition; ancient, English, and American history; philosophy and rhetoric; geography and geology; and botany, chemistry, astronomy, and physiology."

In addition to leading Mary Sharp College, Graves also served at Soule College in Murfreesboro, Tennessee – going there in 1889 when the Baptists bought it. When Nashville Baptists opened Nashville Baptist Female College (aka Boscobel), the interest in Soule was sold, and several faculty members, including Graves, joined the school at Nashville.

With thirty-nine other messengers, Z. C. Graves participated in the organization of the Tennessee Baptist Convention at Murfreesboro, Tennessee in 1874.

== Bibliography ==
- Livermore, Mary Ashton, Frances Elizabeth Willard, editors (1893). A Woman of the Century: Fourteen Hundred-seventy Biographical Sketches Accompanied by Portraits of Leading American Women in All Walks of Life. Buffalo, NY: Charles Wells Moulton.
- Mielnik, Tara Mitchell. “Mary Sharp College.” (2018) Tennessee Encyclopedia of History and Culture.
- Wardin, Albert W. Jr. (1999) Tennessee Baptists: a Comprehensive History, 1779-1999. Brentwood, TN: Tennessee Baptist Convention,
- Wilson, James Grant and John Fiske, eds. (1888) Appleton’s Cyclopaedia of American Biography, Volume II, Crane-Grimshaw. New York, NY: D. Appleton & Co.
