= Kingsville Academy =

Kingsville Academy was a school which was chartered in Kingsville, Ohio in 1834. Its building was constructed in 1836. In its 37-year history, the institution educated about 5,000 students. With the rise of the public high school, enrollment dwindled and, ultimately led to the Academy`s demise and the building burned down in 1927

== Notable people ==
Some of its notable students included:

- John Bidwell
- Daniel Bliss
- Julius C. Burrows
- Adelia Cleopatra Graves (1821-1895), educator, author, poet
- James Robinson Graves
- Stephen A. Northway
- Albion W. Tourgée
