= Annie Somers Gilchrist =

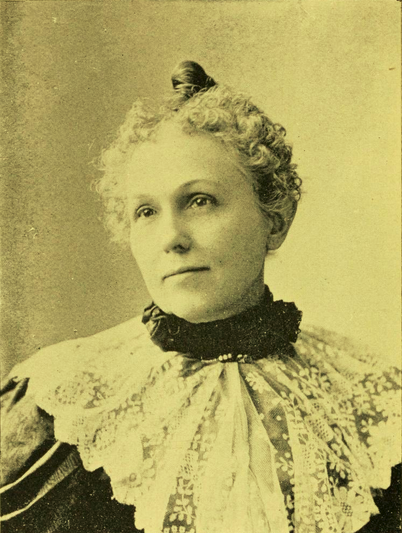
- Born: Annie Somers; 1841 near Dresden, Tennessee, U.S.
- Died: February 2, 1912 (aged 70–71); Nashville, Tennessee, U.S.
- Resting place: Dresden
- Education: Mary Sharp College
- Occupation: writer
- Spouse: John Alexander Gilchrist (m. 1860; died 1891)
- Children: Oscar Gilchrist
- Relatives: George Somers; William Shakespeare
- Writing career
- Genres: novels; poems; biographies
- Notable work: Some Representative Women of Tennessee

Annie Somers Gilchrist (1841 – February 2, 1912) was a pioneer woman author of Tennessee during the long nineteenth century who wrote novels, poetry, and biographies. As a novelist, she was best known by the popular novels: Rosehurst, Harcourt, and The Mystery of Beechcroft. Her poems were numerous. She was also an excellent musician and elocutionist.

== Early life and education ==
Annie Somers was born at "The Oaks", her father's plantation near Dresden, Tennessee, 1841. Her father, James Somers, served in the War of 1812. In 1820, he married Ann McFarland of Wilson County, Tennessee, and removing to Weakley County, Tennessee, he amassed a large fortune, the major part of which he lost during the civil war. She had several older siblings including Jacob, John, James, Jane, Lafayette, and Earskin. John went on to serve as chancellor of the Tenth Division Chancery Court.

She was a Daughters of the American Revolution (D. A. R.) by right of her descent from Captain Matthew Somers, nephew of Sir George Somers, the traveler and soldier for whom Somers Islands (now called Bermuda) were named. On her maternal side, Gilchrist was a descendant of Mary Arden's brother; Mary Arden was the mother of William Shakespeare. (Note: Flora & MacKethan (2001) question Gilchrist's purported kinship with William Shakespeare.) Gilchrist's grandfather, John Somers, a descendant of Captain Matthew, was born in Warwickshire, England, and, marrying there Catherine Arden (cousin to William Shakespeare), emigrated to the Thirteen Colonies, and held a captain's commission in the Revolutionary War.

Gilchrist was educated at the Mary Sharp College, Winchester, Tennessee, receiving instruction in writing from Adelia C. Graves.

== Career ==
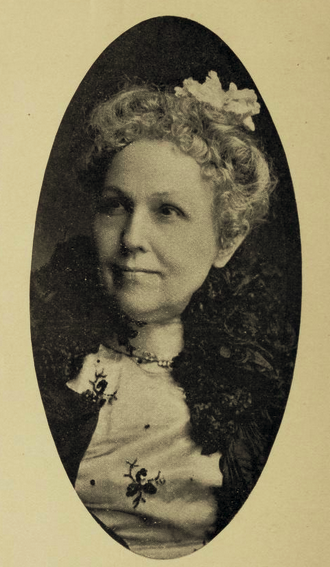
(1902)

She began writing after marriage, becoming a regular contributor to Godey's Lady's Book. Her first story, "The Mystery of Beechcroft", appeared as a serial in that magazine. As a novelist, she was best known by the popular novels: Rosehurst, Harcourt, and The Mystery of Beechcroft. Rosehurst; or, The Step-Daughter (1884), focuses on Marion Lawrence, a woman rejected by her father. She marries, but becomes jealous of the relationship between her husband and his cousin, so she leaves him for another man. She loses her sanity for a time, but regains it and returns to her husband. The Night-Rider's Daughter (1910) focuses on ten year old Gracie Gaylor and her family in the backwoods of Tennessee. They are reliant on lake fishing but their access is removed by ruthless developers. Gracie's father is wrongfully imprisoned and her parents die.

"The Indian's Prophecy", "Put None but Americans on Guard To-night" (which was recited by her at the inaugural of the Tennessee Centennial), "Ethel", "To Annie", and "Our Glorious Banner, the Hope of the Free", were favorably known. "The Indian's Prophecy" and "Put None but Americans on Guard To-night" were read by every D. A. R. chapter in the U.S. as they were published in the association's organ, the American Monthly Magazine. "The Blue Tennessee", "The Great Secret", "Visions", and "Night Thoughts" appeared in Godey's, 1877; "Night Thoughts" was inscribed to Mrs. Hallie Simpson, of Memphis, Tennessee.

In addition to the D. A. R., she was a member of the United Daughters of the Confederacy, and the Nashville Woman's Press and Authors Club. In 1906, she was elected Recording Secretary of the local branch of the Woman's Christian Temperance Union.

== Personal life ==
In Weakley, September 4, 1860, she married John Alexander Gilchrist (1836–1891), a native of New York, and who was of the well-known Gilchrist family. He was a businessman in her native county of Weakley. She resided with her husband in the North during the civil war, 1861–65, but following the close of the war, returned to Nashville where her husband conducted a hotel. They had at least one child, a son, Oscar. By 1897, she was widowed by some years.

In religion, she was a member of the First Baptist Church, Nashville.

Annie Somers Gilchrist died at her home in Nashville, February 2, 1912. Interment was in Dresden.

== Selected works ==
=== Compilations ===
A souvenir of the Tennessee centennial; poems

- Some Representative Women of Tennessee, 1902 (biographies) (Text)
- A souvenir of the Tennessee centennial; poems, 1897 (biographies; poems) (Text)

=== Novels ===
- The Mystery of Beechcroft, 1877
- Rosehurst, or, The step-daughter, 1884
- Harcourt, or, A soul illumined, 1886
- The robins' talk of Tennessee, 1901
- Katherine Somerville, or, the Southland before and after the civil war, 1906 (Text)
- The night-rider's daughter, 1910 (Text)
- Zulieme

=== Poems ===
- "The Indian's Prophecy"
- "Put None but Americans on Guard To-night"
- "Ethel"
- "To Annie"
- "Our Glorious Banner, the Hope of the Free"
- "The Indian's Prophecy"
- "Put None but Americans on Guard To-night"
- "The Blue Tennessee"
- "The Great Secret"
- "Visions"
- "Night Thoughts"
