= Parade Media =

American publisher

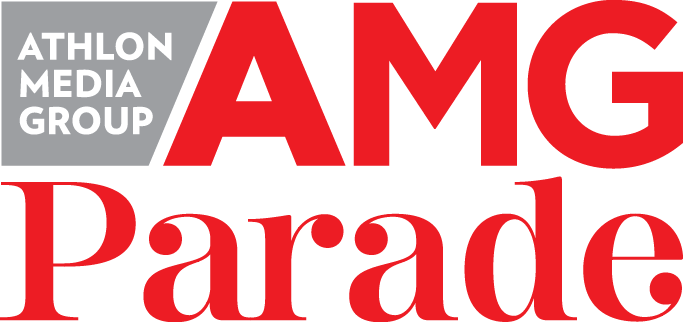
- Logo prior to 2022
- Founded: 1967
- Country of origin: United States
- Headquarters location: Nashville, Tennessee
- Key people: Spencer Hays (majority owner)
- Publication types: Magazines
- Official website: www.parademediagroup.com

Parade Media (previously known as AMG/Parade and Athlon Media Group) is a publisher founded in 1967 that is based in Nashville, Tennessee. Nashville's Spencer Hays was its majority stockholder. It was purchased by The Arena Group in 2022 and now operates as a subsidiary of The Arena Group.

== Athlon Sports ==
Athlon is best known for publishing preseason single-title sports annuals on professional and college sports. The annuals are sold at newsstands in the U.S., Canada, Mexico, and Europe. It is the U.S.'s largest publisher of sports annuals, ranking Number 1 in retail sales dollars and magazines sold.

Athlon's 15 sports magazines include Athlon Sports Monthly, Pro Football, Fantasy Football, National College Football, Southeastern Football, Atlantic Coast Football, Big Ten Football, Big 12 Football, Big East Football, Pac-10 Football, Baseball, College Basketball, Pro Basketball, Racing and Golf. Athlon's digital properties include AthlonSports.com, which has daily coverage of the sports it covers.

On October 1, 2022, it was announced that Athlon Sports would be discontinuing its special magazines due to its merger with Sports Illustrated. The new special magazines will be released in the Sports Illustrated manner. The merger was undone in 2024 with Sports Illustrated owner Authentic Brands Group revoking The Arena Group's license to use the Sports Illustrated brand and transferring it to Minute Media; The Arena Group's sports content, which was being published under the SI banner at the time, moved to a revived Athlon Sports website.

== History ==
In February 2006, it acquired Grogans Sports Information Inc., a fantasy sports publisher based in Littleton, Colorado, that publishes Grogans Fantasy Football Analyst in-season scouting reports.

In June 2010, Athlon Sports Communications appointed Anthony Flaccavento as publisher for Athlon Sports magazine. Athlon Sports is a monthly publication that launched in October 2010. Athlon Sports began with a circulation of seven million and grew to nine million in 2011.

In 2013, Athlon acquired the print rights to three magazines distributed as newspaper inserts: American Profile, Relish, and Spry. Athlon did not develop the associated websites and later launched the companion website Community Table. In 2014, Athlon acquired Parade from Advance Publications.

In 2016, Athlon acquired the titles of Harris Publications, which had been shut down.

Athlon Sports, as well as Tom James Co, an affiliated company, have been accused of racism by several employees who complain of an extremely religious, right-wing and racist atmosphere.

In August 2023, Manoj Bhargava announced that he would be merging his Bridge Media Networks (the owner of NewsNet) with The Arena Group, bringing Parade Media under his majority control.

== Publications ==
- AMG Lifestyle
  - Harris Farmer's Almanac
- AMG/Parade
  - Athlon Sports
  - Parade
- Athlon Outdoors
  - American Frontiersman
  - Ballistic
  - Combat Handguns
  - Guns of the Old West
  - Mopar Action
  - The New Pioneer
  - Survivor's Edge
  - Tactical Weapons
- The Spun by Athlon Sports
