= Hank Fort =

American singer and songwriter

- Hank Fort c. 1957
- Born: Eleanor Louise Middleton Hankins; June 19, 1908; Nashville, Tennessee, U.S.
- Died: January 12, 1973 (aged 64); Washington, D.C., U.S.
- Resting place: Mount Olivet Cemetery
- Occupations: Singer, songwriter
- Spouse(s): Walter A. Fort, m. 1928/1/3; William McAuliffe, m. 1964/2/19
- Parent(s): Cornelius Hankins; Maude McGehee

Hank Fort (née Eleanor Hankins, 1908–1973) was an American singer and songwriter of the mid 20th century from Nashville, Tennessee. She composed over 400 songs, many with a humorous Southern viewpoint, including "Put Your Shoes On, Lucy" (recorded by Petula Clark), and "I Didn't Know the Gun Was Loaded" The Andrews Sisters, and "Save Your Confederate Money, Boys, the South Shall Rise Again". Known for her humor and sunny personality, her Washington, D.C. apartment was a gathering place for scores of admirers, many of whom were political figures. These included Sam Rayburn, Lyndon Johnson, Hale Boggs and Liz Carpenter (Lady Bird Johnson's press secretary). In 1960, Fort campaigned actively for John F. Kennedy, traveling in the South entertaining with Mrs. Johnson, Ethel Kennedy, Eunice Shriver, and Jean Kennedy Smith. Her composition, "Look With Pride On Our Flag", was played at the second inauguration of Richard Nixon in 1973. Upon her death January 12, 1973, Barry Goldwater delivered the eulogy at her memorial service.

== Early life ==
Hank Fort was born Eleanor Hankins on June 19, 1908, in Nashville, Tennessee. She attended Peabody Demonstration School and Ward–Belmont College, where she became known by the nickname "Hank". After graduation, during World War II, she began writing songs and entertaining at army camps.

Her father, Cornelius Hankins (1863–1946), was a portrait artist. He studied with Robert Henri (leader of the "Ashcan School") and with William Merritt Chase in New York. Hankins' portraits of political figures and military generals are displayed in the US state capitol buildings of Tennessee, Alabama, Mississippi, and Louisiana. Her mother, Maude McGehee Hankins, was an artist and a writer of children's verse.

In 1928, at age 19, she married Walter A. Fort, an insurance executive, taking his name; they later divorced. Her second marriage, in 1964, was to Bill McAuliffe, a Washington investment broker whom she met on a cruise. She began writing songs for the presidential campaign of Senator Estes Kefauver of Tennessee, which brought her to the attention of Lady Bird Johnson. After moving to Washington, D.C. with McAuliffe, her songs and her piano entertaining became popular in Washington society.

== Career ==
Fort composed over 400 songs. Her song, "Put Your Shoes On, Lucy" was recorded by Petula Clark in 1949, and by Anne Shelton in 1952. Fort's composition, "I Didn't Know the Gun Was Loaded", was a minor hit for The Andrews Sisters. In 1958 Fort released an album on Epic Records, Hank Fort Sings and Plays Her Own Songs which included such ditties as "Save Your Confederate Money, Boys" and "You Can't Hurt Me Now Cause I'm Daid".

One of her intimate friends was Liz Carpenter, Lady Bird Johnson's press secretary. Speaking of Fort, Carpenter said, "She threw herself wholeheartedly into everything". She became interested in politics in the 1960s and, at the invitation of Mrs. Johnson, Fort participated in the "flying tea parties", a part of the Kennedy–Johnson presidential campaign . In these gatherings, she traveled throughout the South entertaining along with Mrs. Johnson, Ethel Kennedy, Eunice Shriver, and Jean Kennedy Smith. Her Washington apartment became a frequent social gathering place for politicians including Sam Rayburn, Estes Kefauver, Albert Gore, George Smathers, and Lyndon Johnson. One of Fort's songs, "Look With Pride On Our Flag", dedicated to President Richard Nixon, was played at his 1973 inauguration ceremony, eight days after Fort's death.

== Children's theater ==
Fort was active for many years in the Nashville Children's Theater, after participating in it herself when she was a child. It is a project that began as a Junior League undertaking, but grew into a larger community project. Fort was head of the project in Nashville to become one of the first junior theaters in the US to become self-sustaining.

== "Fortnightly" ==
In 1935, Fort created a ballroom dancing class for youth in Nashville called "Fortnightly". The lessons became a tradition of teaching dance along with the social niceties of the ballroom to generations of Nashville youth. Fort joined with a business partner, Mrs. Martha Perkins Trousdale and later Carol Woolwine, to get the school going. Initially classes were at country clubs or Nashville's Parmer School; Fort came to terms with Albertine Maxwell to use her home at 3325 West End Avenue. The school endured for 23 years and was a well-known rite of passage for youngsters in the sixth, seventh and eighth grades. Some students thought "Fortnightly" was named for Mrs. Fort. She said, "It came as a shock to them that the name came from the twice-a-month meetings". Former student Tom Henderson, said, "An annual costume party held at the old Centennial Club on 8th Avenue for all pupils was the highlight of the year during that time and was the talk of the town". After Fort left Nashville for New York and Washington, the school continued operating and Fort commuted to Nashville at the beginning of the season and again for the masquerade ball at the end.

== Death ==
Fort died on January 12, 1973, in Washington, D.C. Liz Carpenter wrote her obituary. At her memorial service, Barry Goldwater gave her eulogy and read a prayer he had written.
