= Eva Munson Smith =

American poet

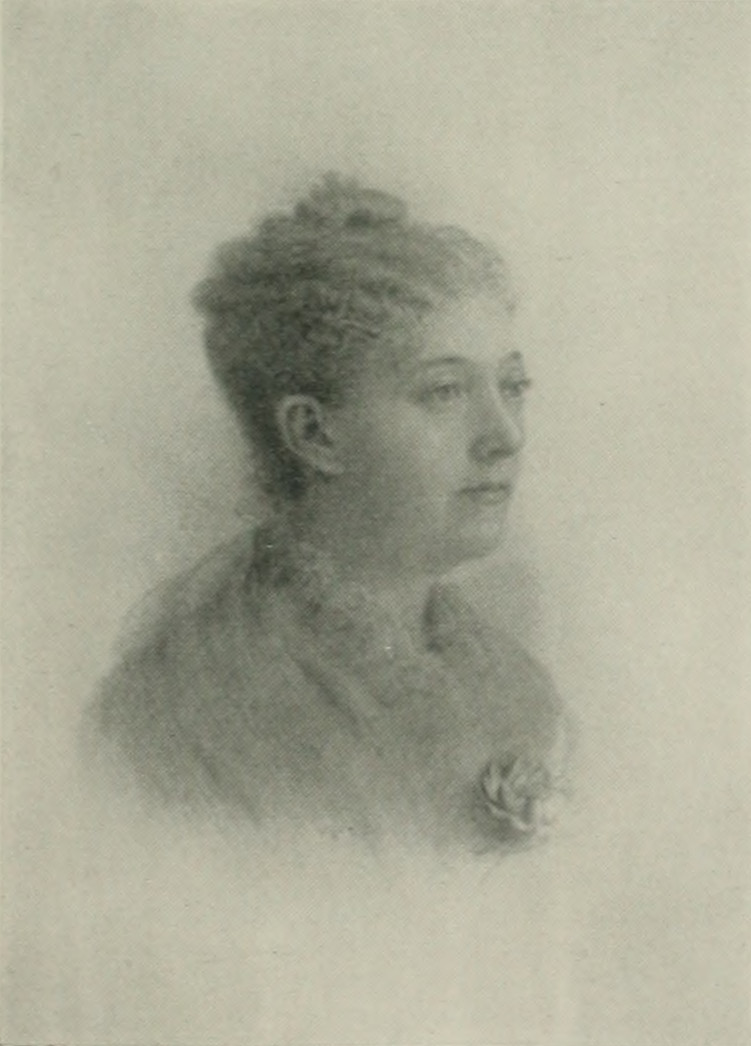
- Photo from "A Woman of the Century"
- Born: Evaline Frances Munson; July 12, 1843; Monkton, Vermont, U.S.
- Died: November 5, 1915 (aged 72); Jacksonville, Illinois, U.S.
- Education: Mary Sharp College; Rockford Female Seminary
- Occupations: composer; poet; author
- Spouse: George Clinton Smith (m. 1869)
- Writing career
- Notable work: Woman in Sacred Song (1885)

Signature
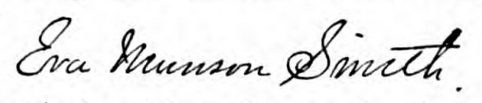

Eva Munson Smith (née,Munson; also known after marriage as, Mrs. George Clinton Smith; July 12, 1843 – November 5, 1915) was an American composer, poet, and author. She was the author of Woman in Sacred Song (1885), a representative work of what women have done in hymnology. She was the author of a large number of temperance songs and other works, which became very popular. Her poems appeared in Poets of America and other standard works. Her best known productions were "Woodland Warblings", "American Rifle Team March", and "I Will Not Leave You Comfortless".

== Early life and education ==
Evaline Frances Munson was born in Monkton, Vermont, on July 12, 1843. She was the daughter of William Chandler Munson and Hannah Bailey Munson. Her parents came from Puritan ancestry. Her father was an eminent educator and patriot of his day. He was descended from Capt. Thomas Munson who was born in England in 1612 and came to the Colonies in 1639. He settled first in Hartford, Connecticut, and afterward removed to New Haven, Connecticut. Her mother was a direct descendant of Anna Warner Bailey, of Revolutionary fame, who tore up her flannel petticoat to make wadding for the guns in battle. Her musical and poetical abilities appeared in her childhood, and she was, while yet a girl, a proficient musician, a fine singer and a writer of notable verse. At the age of five years, she composed little airs, and at fourteen, she wrote her musical compositions in form for publication and preservation. She united early with the church, and her musical abilities were turned into the religious channel, such as singing in church choirs.

Mr. Munson and his daughter moved to Lagrange, Missouri and then to Winchester, Tennessee, where she received a good education in the Mary Sharp College. Owing to his union sympathies, Mr. Munson lost his business, and removed to Rockford, Illinois where Eva was graduated from the Rockford Female Seminary (now Rockford University), in 1864. He died there shortly after.

== Career ==
After her father's death, Munson had to rely upon her own resources. She was removed to Nebraska City, Nebraska, where she had full charge of the musical department of Otoe University.

Having observed at an early age that many of the choicest musical productions were the work of women, she decided to make a collection of the sacred compositions of women, and the result was her compilation, Woman in Sacred Song (Boston, 1885). The second edition, published in 1887, contained poetry written by 830 women and 150 musical compositions by 50 different women. The work became internationally known.

Smith composed many popular pieces. Her "Joy" was published in 1868. Among her best known productions are "Woodland Warblings", "Home Sonata", "American Rifle Team March", and "I Will Not Leave You Comfortless". She set to music for voice and piano Lincoln's favorite poem, "Oh, Why Should the Spirit of Mortal Be Proud?".

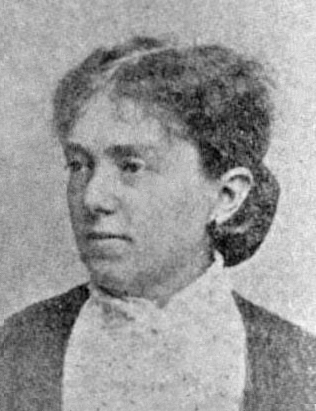
1904

She married George Clinton Smith in 1869, a druggist, in Nebraska; they had no children. The couple moved to Topeka, Kansas and from that city to Springfield, Illinois in 1873 or 1874. They resided in Illinois for twenty years, where she taught elocution and music. She held salons with a large circle of temperance and religious workers, and musical, literary and patriotic persons. She was in sympathy with missionary, moral and patriotic movements. For two years, during 1890 and 1891, She served as president of Stephenson Woman's Relief Corps, No. 17, president of the Suffrage Association of Springfield, vice-president of the Illinois Equal Suffrage Club, president of the North Woman's Christian Temperance Union, and historian for the Daughters of the American Revolution.

She was a candidate for trustee of the University of Illinois on the Prohibition ticket in 1912; and a one time candidate for state superintendent of public instruction on the Prohibition ticket.

== Personal life and death ==
Smith traveled extensively in the U.S. In religion, she was a member of the Presbyterian Church. Smith died at the Jacksonville State Hospital in Jacksonville, Illinois, November 5, 1915, and was buried at the Oak Ridge Cemetery in Springfield.

== Selected works ==
Woman in Sacred Song

=== Books ===
- Woman in Sacred Song, 1885

=== Musical compositions ===
- "Joy", 1868
- "Woodland Warblings"
- "The Home Sonata", 1877
- "American Rifle Team March"
- "I Will Not Leave You Comfortless"
