= Cornelius Hankins =

American painter

- Born: Cornelius Haley Hankins; July 12, 1863; Itawamba County, Mississippi, C.S.
- Died: May 12, 1946 (aged 82); Nashville, Tennessee, U.S.
- Resting place: Mount Olivet Cemetery
- Occupation: Painter
- Spouse: Maude McGehee
- Children: Hank Fort
- Parent(s): Edward Locke Hankins; Annie Mary McFadden

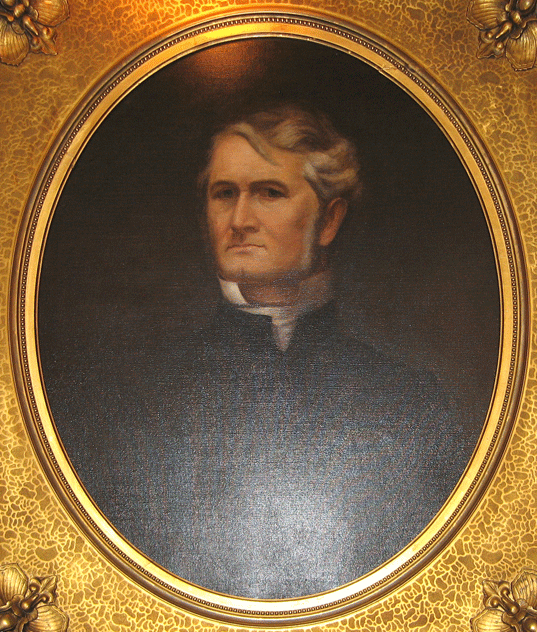
Portrait of Leonidas Polk by Cornelius Hankins, c.1905

Cornelius Hankins (1863-1946) was an American painter. He painted agrarian landscapes of Tennessee and portraits of Confederate veterans and politicians.

== Early life ==
Cornelius Hankins was born on July 12, 1863, in Itawamba County, Mississippi. His father was Edward Locke Hankins and his mother, Annie Mary McFadden.

== Career ==
Hankins moved to Nashville, Tennessee, where he was taught painting by Edwin M. Gardner, an art teacher and painter. By 1897, he taught at the Richmond Art Club in Richmond, Virginia. Meanwhile, he began exhibiting his work. By March 1902, his paintings were exhibited at the University Club in Nashville. A decade later, in November 1912, they were exhibited at the Centennial Club.

Hankins painted a portrait of Sumner Archibald Cunningham, the founder of the Confederate Veteran. He also painted a portrait of Caroline Meriwether Goodlett, the founding president of the United Daughters of the Confederacy. Additionally, he painted a portrait of Confederate General Robert E. Lee for the Tennessee General Assembly in 1901. He also did 15 portraits for the Shelby County Courthouse in Memphis, Tennessee. He went on to do portraits of Confederate General Nathan Bedford Forrest, Admiral Albert Gleaves, Senator William B. Bate, Governor Albert H. Roberts and Governor Benton McMillin.

Some of Hankins's portraits were donated by Confederate veteran or university alumni groups to public and private institutions. For example, Hankins painted a portrait of Confederate General Benjamin F. Cheatham for the Frank Cheatham Bivouac of the Association of Confederate Soldiers, who unveiled it in the Tennessee State Chamber and placed it in the Tennessee State Library in 1904. He also painted a portrait of Julia A. Sears, a founding faculty member of the Peabody College for Teachers (now part of Vanderbilt University), which was placed in the chapel in 1904. Additionally, Hankins painted a portrait of William Lofland Dudley, the founding dean of the Vanderbilt University School of Medicine; it was donated by local alumni to Vanderbilt University in 1915.

According to the Tennessee Encyclopedia of History and Culture, "At the time of his death, nine of his portraits were hanging in the Tennessee State Capitol, six in the Alabama State Capitol, two in the Mississippi State Capitol, and one in the Louisiana State Capitol."

== Personal life ==
Hankins married Maude McGehee. They had two daughters, Eleanor Hankins, known professionally as Hank Fort, who became a renowned singer, and Dorothy Churchill Hankins Wood.

== Death ==
Hankins died on May 12, 1946, in Nashville, Tennessee. He was buried at the Mount Olivet Cemetery.
