= Mary Sharp College =

Former American women's college

Coordinates: 35.178°N 86.116°W

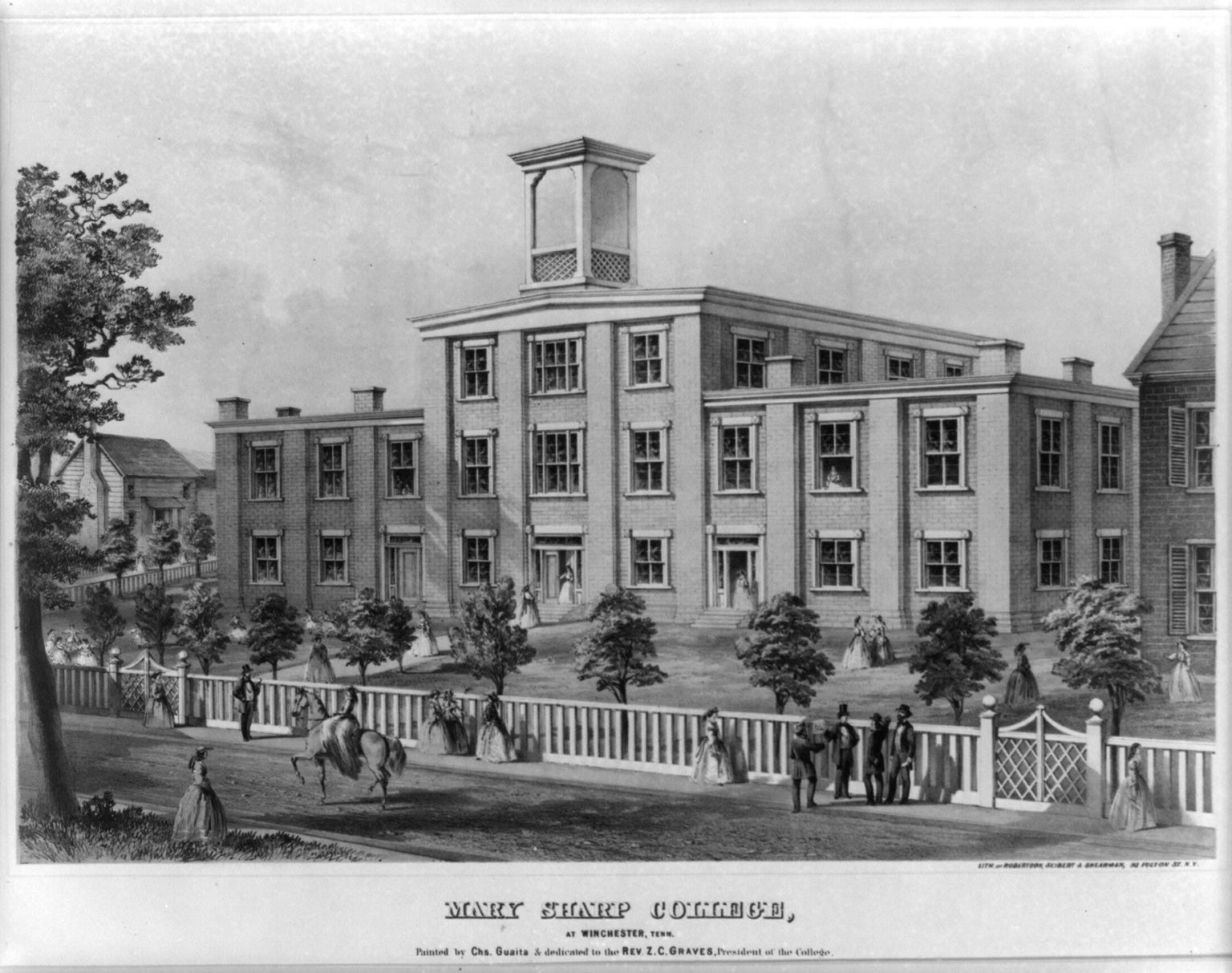
- Type: Women's college
- Established: 1851–1896
- Location: Winchester, Tennessee, USA

Mary Sharp College (1851–1896), first known as the Tennessee and Alabama Female Institute, was a women's college, located in Winchester, Tennessee. It was named after the abolitionist Mary Sharp.

== History ==
The college was first chartered in 1850 and was directed by Dr. Zuinglius Calvin Graves and the Baptist Church. It "was the first women's college in the United States to offer degrees equivalent to those offered at men's colleges."

Graves offered a radical curriculum. He patterned the classical curriculum at Mary Sharp College after those offered at Amherst College, Brown University, and the University of Virginia. He emphasized religious and moral training and required every student to attend chapel. Students at Mary Sharp, unlike those at other female colleges and academies, studied algebra, geometry, and trigonometry; Latin and Greek; English literature, grammar, and composition; ancient, English, and American history; philosophy and rhetoric; geography and geology; and botany, chemistry, astronomy, and physiology.

The college awarded its first degrees in 1855. The economic depression of the 1890s led to its closure in 1896.

== Notable people ==
=== Teachers and administrator ===
- Edwin M. Gardner (1845–1935) Confederate veteran and painter
- Adelia Cleopatra Graves (1821—1895), educator, author, poet
- Zuinglius Calvin Graves Jr. (1816–1902) Baptist preacher and educator, the first President of Mary Sharp College
- Mary Louise Nash (1826-1896), American educator and writer

=== Alumni ===
- Annie Somers Gilchrist (1841–1912), writer
- Eva Munson Smith (1843–1915), composer, poet, author

== See also ==
- Female seminary
- Timeline of women's colleges in the United States
