= Second inauguration of Richard Nixon =

47th United States presidential inauguration

Second presidential inauguration of Richard Nixon
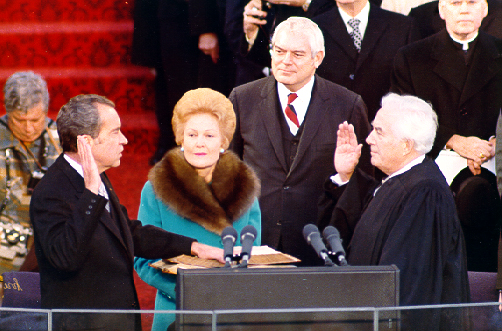
- Richard Nixon takes the oath of office for his second term
- Date: January 20, 1973; 53 years ago
- Location: United States Capitol, Washington, D.C.
- Organized by: Joint Congressional Committee on Inaugural Ceremonies
- Participants: Richard Nixon; 37th president of the United States — Assuming office Spiro Agnew; 39th vice president of the United States — Assuming office Warren E. Burger; Chief Justice of the United States — Administering oaths

The second inauguration of Richard Nixon as president of the United States was held on Saturday, January 20, 1973, at the East Portico of the United States Capitol in Washington, D.C. This was the 47th inauguration and marked the commencement of the second and final term of both Richard Nixon as president and Spiro Agnew as vice president. Both Agnew and Nixon resigned within two years of this term. In December 1973, Gerald Ford replaced Agnew as vice president and in the following year, replaced Nixon as president. This made Nixon the first and, as of 2026, only person to be inaugurated four times as both president and vice president. Chief Justice Warren E. Burger administered both the presidential and vice presidential oaths of office. During the ceremony, Look With Pride On Our Flag, a song dedicated to President Nixon and composed by Hank Fort, was played.

Weather conditions for 12 noon at Washington National Airport, located 3.1 miles (4.8 km) from the ceremony, were: 42 °F (6 °C), wind 16 mph (25 km/h), and cloudy.

== Inaugural festivities ==
The inaugural theme was "The Spirit of '76". The 1973 Inaugural Committee's chairman was J. Willard Marriott. Other officers of the committee and its working groups included Jeb Magruder, Mark Evans, Ken Rietz, Ed Cowling, Ann Dore, Pam Powell. H. R. Haldeman was not officially part of the committee but was involved in many of the committee's important decisions.

When former president Lyndon B. Johnson, whom Nixon succeeded four years earlier, died two days after the inauguration, several events planned were cancelled to allow for a state funeral. Also, Johnson's casket traveled the entire length of the Capitol, entering through the Senate wing when taken into the rotunda to lie in state, and exiting through the House wing; this was due to inauguration construction on the East Front steps.

The Apollo 17 astronauts joined the inaugural parade along with a training version of the Lunar Roving Vehicle, Apollo 17 was the final mission of the program and would be the last crewed moon mission until Artemis 2 sent crew on a lunar fly-by more than 50 years later.

=== Concerts ===
Three simultaneous inaugural concerts were planned: a Symphonic Concert (a "show for financial contributors") held at Kennedy Center Concert Hall, a Youth Concert ("a show for young people", to feature the Osmonds and the Carpenters), and an American Music Concert ("a show for all others", to feature country, folk, jazz, Dixieland, etc).

The committee decided to program Eugene Ormandy, Nixon's favorite conductor (Nixon had awarded Ormandy the Presidential Medal of Freedom in 1970), and the Philadelphia Orchestra for the Symphonic Concert, breaking the tradition since the 1930s of hiring the National Symphony Orchestra for the inauguration. In early December 1972 the committee considered asking Dimitri Tiomkin for a new work to accompany a reading of Lincoln's 2nd inaugural address for the concert (possibly at the suggestion of Nixon's friend and supporter Tex Ritter, for whom Tiomkin's The Ballad of High Noon became a signature tune).

But with fears that Tiomkin would work too slow, and at Ormandy's suggestion, Vincent Persichetti was approached to write the work. Persichetti completed the work in two weeks, it became his A Lincoln Address, opus 124. During the time that Persichetti was composing; the Vietnam War's Christmas Bombings began. The committee developed reservations about the appropriateness of Lincoln's address at the inauguration in the climate of war, and pulled Persichetti's composition from the program after it had been announced.

The Symphonic Concert's program consisted of:

- National Anthem
- Copland's Fanfare for the Common Man
- Beethoven's 5th symphony
- a choral medley of patriotic American music, including portions of the Declaration of Independence read by Charlton Heston, and ending with America the Beautiful, led by Robert Wagner and the Los Angeles Master Chorale
- Grieg's Piano Concerto played by Van Cliburn
- Tchaikovsky's 1812 overture.

== Protests ==
Just like during Nixon's first inauguration, there were protests over the Vietnam War.

== See also ==
- Presidency of Richard Nixon
- First inauguration of Richard Nixon
- 1972 United States presidential election
- Richard Nixon 1972 presidential campaign
