= Adelia Cleopatra Graves =

American educator, author, and poet

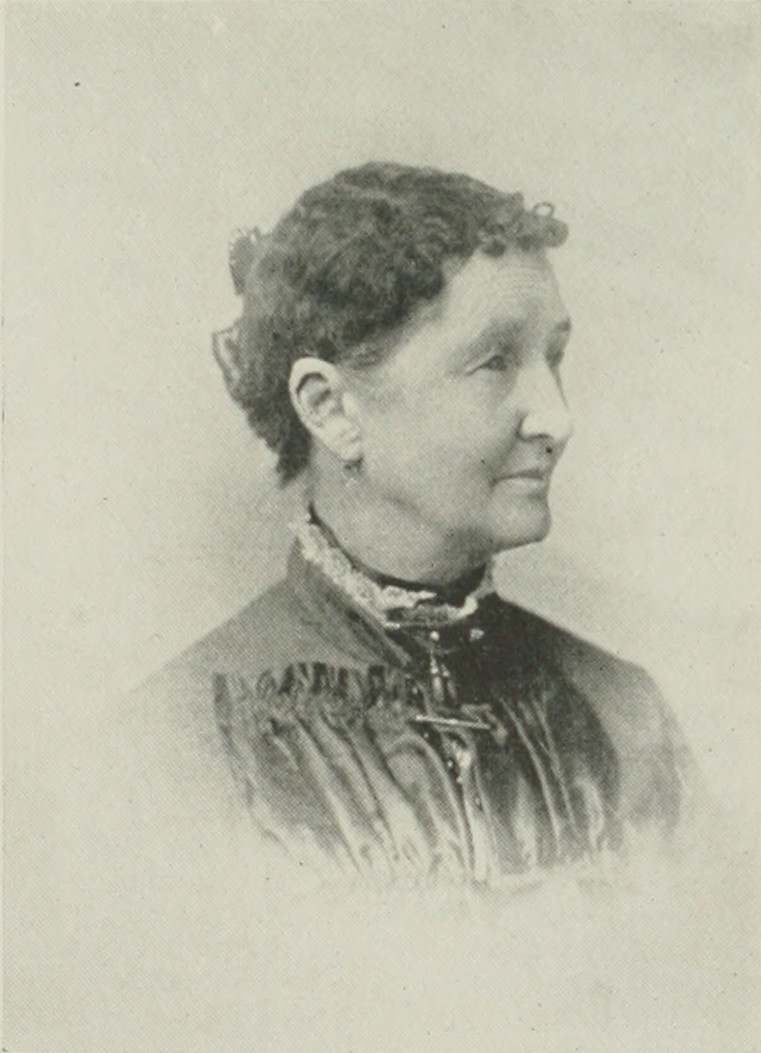
- Photo from "A Woman of the Century"
- Born: Adelia Cleopatra Spencer; March 17, 1821; Kingsville, Ohio, U.S.
- Died: November 6, 1895 (aged 74); Winchester, Tennessee, U.S.
- Education: Kingsville Academy
- Occupations: educator, author, poet
- Spouse: Zuinglius Calvin Graves (m. 1841)
- Relatives: Platt Rogers Spencer (uncle)
- Writing career
- Pen name: Aunt Alice
- Language: English
- Notable works: Life of Columbus; Poems for Children; Seclusarval, or the Arts of Romanism; and Jephtha's Daughter, a drama

Adelia Cleopatra Graves (pen name, Aunt Alice; March 17, 1821 - 1895) was an American educator, author, and poet. At one time serving as Professor of Latin and Belles-lettres at Mary Sharp College, she went on to occupy the position of Matron and Professor of Rhetoric in the college. In 1841, she married Prof. Zuinglius Calvin Graves (1816–1902), who was serving as president of Kingsville Academy. She was the author of several books including juvenile literature under the pseudonym of "Aunt Alice". She also contributed prose and verse to periodical literature. In her day, Graves was one of the most popular writers of the South. Her best-known works were: Life of Columbus; Poems for Children; Seclusarval, or the Arts of Romanism; and Jephtha's Daughter, a drama.

== Early years and education ==
Adelia Cleopatra Spencer was born in Kingsville, Ohio, March 17, 1821. She was the daughter of Dr. Daniel M. Spencer and Marian T. Cook, and a niece of Platt Rogers Spencer, the originator of the Spencerian script. Graves' mother was an intellectual. Her family was wealthy and cultured, all the men having for generations had the benefit of collegiate education. Her father especially excelled in the Greek and Latin languages.

Graves spent her early life on the shores of Lake Erie, where she resolved to devote her life to literature. She loved to be alone, passing her time on the beach, or in the old forests near where she had been born. Her love of nature was a passion, the record of which was preserved in some of her earliest unpublished poems. Stanzas written before she was nine years old were models of correct versification, exhibiting simplicity of expression and happy choice of words which characterized the productions of her more mature years. She wrote because she could not restrain the flow of thoughts, taking shape in rhymes.

She was a graduate of Kingsville Academy.

== Career ==
In 1841, she married Dr. Zuinglius Calvin Graves, who was at that time president of Kingsville Academy; later, president of Soule College; and founder and president of Mary Sharp College. A few years after her marriage, Graves received a bad injury, which severely limited her physical energy. For five years, she could not walk across her room; and later found it difficult to walk a short distance.

For years, she taught classes in languages in the Kingsville Academy. At Mary Sharp College, there were few positions she did not occupy at some point, save that of mathematics. For 32 years, she was matron and professor of rhetoric, belles-lettres, elocution, and English composition. She also taught French, ancient history, ancient geography, and English literature.

The published works of Graves include Seclusaval, or the Arts of Romanism (1870), a work written to deter Protestants from sending children to Catholic schools; and Jephtha's Daughter, a drama, (1867). Besides these, there were two prize stories. Twelve or thirteen small volumes were also compiled from the Southern Child's Book, at the request of the Southern Baptist Sabbath School Union, for the use of Sunday schools. For years, Graves edited and wrote for that publication. She wrote the Old Testament Catechism in Rhyme (1859), on request of the same society, for African American slaves, for which she received US$0.20 a line. Her unpublished poems were numerous.

Graves contributed to different periodicals, mostly fugitive poems, and two prose tales, and a prize tale. "Ruined Lives," published in the Southern Repository, in Memphis, Tennessee, and the drama of Jephthah's Daughter, were some of her other published works.

Graves is mentioned in Woman in Sacred Song, and Southland Poets, as well as in the Successful Men of Tennessee for her extraordinary financial ability, having managed a business of US$15,000−20,000 per year for years at a time.

== Selected works ==
- 1835, Woman in Sacred Song
- 1854, First lessons in gentleness and truth.: By Aunt Alice
- 1855, A home book : for good children
- 1859, Melodies of heart and home
- 1859, The child's scripture catechism in rhyme
- 1867, Jephthah's Daughter. A Drama in Five Acts. Founded on the Eleventh Chapter of Judges
- 1869, Seclusaval : or, The arts of romanism
