= Edwin M. Gardner =

American painter

- Born: October 12, 1845; Giles County, Tennessee, U.S.
- Died: October 28, 1935 (aged 90); Nashville, Tennessee, U.S.
- Resting place: Mount Olivet Cemetery
- Occupation: Painter

Edwin M. Gardner (1845–1935) was an American Confederate veteran and painter.

== Early life ==
Gardner was born on October 12, 1845, in Giles County, Tennessee. He grew up in Mississippi. During the American Civil War of 1861–1865, he served in the Confederate States Army under General Nathan Bedford Forrest.

Gardner took painting lessons at the Royal Academy of Arts in Belgium and the National Academy Museum and School in New York City.

== Career ==
Gardner started his career as an art teacher at a female academy in Aberdeen, Mississippi, followed by Mary Sharp College, a female academy in Winchester, Tennessee. He moved to Nashville, Tennessee, where he joined the Nashville Art Association and taught at the Watkins Institute, where he had a studio. One of his students, Cornelius Hankins, became a prominent painter in the South.

Gardner did a portrait of Sarah Childress Polk. He also painted blacks.

== Death ==
Gardner died on October 28, 1935, in Nashville, Tennessee. He was buried at the Mount Olivet Cemetery.
