= Hôtel de Noirmoutier =

Coordinates: 48.8578°N 2.3167°E

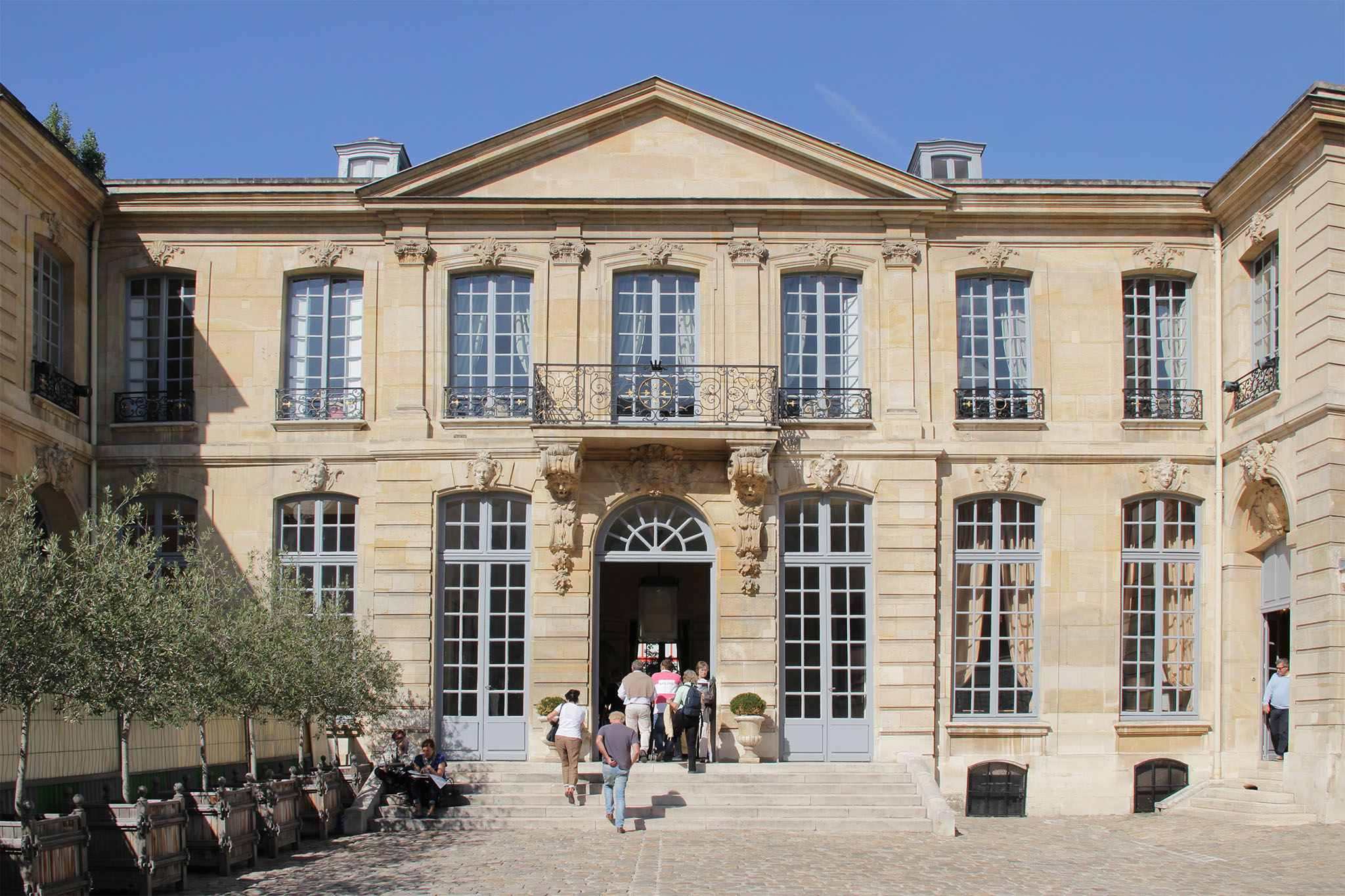
- Interactive map of the Hôtel de Noirmoutier area

General information
- Type: Hôtel particulier
- Classification: Monument historique (12 February 1996)
- Location: Paris, France

The Hôtel de Noirmoutier (French pronunciation: [otɛl də nwaʁmutje]) is an hôtel particulier in the 7th arrondissement of Paris, France. It was built in 1723. It has been listed by the French Ministry of Culture since 12 February 1996.

The mansion served as a model for Spencer Hays's residence in Nashville, Tennessee.
