= Stephen A. Northway =

American politician

Stephen Asa Northway
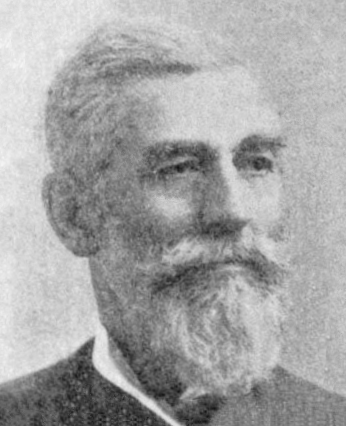

Member of the U.S. House of Representatives from Ohio's 19th district
- In office March 4, 1893 – September 8, 1898
- Preceded by: Ezra B. Taylor
- Succeeded by: Charles W. F. Dick

Member of the Ohio House of Representatives from the Ashtabula County district
- In office January 1, 1866 – January 5, 1868
- Preceded by: Abner Kellogg
- Succeeded by: William M. Eames

Personal details
- Born: June 19, 1833 Christian Hollow, New York, U.S.
- Died: September 8, 1898 (aged 65) Jefferson, Ohio, U.S.
- Resting place: Oakdale Cemetery
- Party: Republican
- Education: Kingsville Academy

Stephen Asa Northway (June 19, 1833 – September 8, 1898) was an American lawyer and politician who served as a U.S. representative from Ohio from 1893 to 1898.

== Early life ==
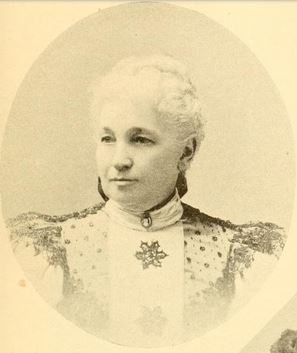
Mrs Stephen A. Northway

Born in Christian Hollow, New York, Northway moved with his parents in 1840 to the township of Orwell, Ohio. He attended the district school, Kingsville Academy, and Orwell Academy. He taught school. He studied law.

== Career ==
He was admitted to the bar in 1859 and commenced practice in Jefferson, Ohio. He served as prosecuting attorney of Ashtabula County 1861-1865. He served as member of the State house of representatives in 1865 and 1866. He resumed the practice of law.

== Later life and death ==
Northway was elected as a Republican to the Fifty-third, Fifty-fourth, and Fifty-fifth Congresses and served from March 4, 1893, until his death in Jefferson, Ohio, on September 8, 1898. He was interred in Oakdale Cemetery.

== See also ==
- List of members of the United States Congress who died in office (1790–1899)

== Sources ==
- United States Congress. "Stephen A. Northway (id: N000144)". Biographical Directory of the United States Congress.

U.S. House of Representatives
Preceded by Ezra B. Taylor	Member of the U.S. House of Representatives from Ohio's 19th congressional district 1893–1898	Succeeded by Charles W. F. Dick
