= Southwestern Advantage =

American marketing company

- Type: Private
- Industry: Conglomerate
- Founded: 1855
- Founder: Rev. J. R. V. Graves
- Headquarters: Nashville, Tennessee, United States
- Key people: Henry Bedford, CEO; Dave Causer, President - Southwestern Family of Companies
- Parent: Southwestern family of companies
- Website: www.southwesternadvantage.com

Southwestern Advantage (formerly known as Southwestern Company), is an education material sales company based in Nashville, TN. The privately owned company recruits college and university students as independent contractors to sell educational books, apps, and website subscriptions door-to-door using direct selling methods. Southwestern Advantage is part of the Southwestern Family of Companies.

== History ==
In 1855, Southwestern Publishing House was established in Nashville, Tennessee. The company's name reflected its location at the time, in the southwestern part of the United States. Founded by Baptist minister, James Robinson Graves, the company originally published a Southern Baptist newspaper as well as religious pamphlets that were distributed by mail. In 1868, J. R. Graves discontinued the mail-order business model, and began training men to sell Bibles and educational books door-to-door as a way to earn money for college. The program has operated continuously since then and is one of the longest-running entrepreneurial training initiatives for college students in the United States. In the 1920s, the company became one of the largest door-to-door sales companies in America.

Southwestern lost nearly all of its representatives as a result of World War II. It was rebuilt through the Great Depression and the number of independent representatives grew to over 1500. In 1968, the Times-Mirror Company purchased Southwestern. In 1982, the company was purchased by Southwestern employees and renamed Southwestern/Great American Incorporated (SWGA Inc.).

In 2022, Southwestern Advantage President Dan Moore retired. He worked for the company as a student representative in 1974 and earned enough to pay his tuition at Harvard University. After graduating with a B.A. in government, he joined Southwestern Advantage as a district sales manager. He was later promoted to vice president of marketing and then became the company’s president in 2007.

Upon Moore's retirement, Southwestern Advantage named Dave Causer as the new president of the company.

== Program overview ==
The company sells educational material for use from preschool to college prep.

Every year, the company recruits American and European university students to work as independent contractors who sell educational books, software, and subscription websites during the summer months. Students who accept a position complete a free, week-long training program in Nashville, Tennessee. After completing the program, students are assigned a position outside of their home or school states, and are typically responsible for housing costs of about $50/week, usually living with a host family. Sales areas are predominantly suburban or rural.

The company operates on a direct sales platform, where wages are solely determined by sales revenue minus expenses and costs of goods sold; they do not offer employee benefits or guaranteed pay. Students are also responsible for their expenses (like food and gas) while operating in the field during the selling season, and foreign students must pay for their visas and airfare themselves. Some universities consider the program an internship eligible for college credits.

The commission rate for most dealers is 40%. Some students report working 80 hours a week or more during selling season, though minimum quotas are not mandated by Southwestern. Attendance to weekly Sunday meetings with managers are also not mandatory, but if a meeting space is rented, dealers are encouraged to pay $10–20 each to share expenses.

The program provides participants with opportunities to develop business-related skills, including goal-setting, scheduling, communication, problem-solving, and money management, which are not typically emphasized in traditional classroom settings.

== Products ==
Southwestern Advantage publishes and markets educational books, software, and subscription websites. The main product, Southwestern Advantage, is a series of educational reference books targeted to school-age children. The product line also includes apps, college prep material, and others.

In 2019, student dealers represented over 240 college and university campuses around the world.

== Controversy ==
=== Lobbying ===
In 2007, Southwestern Advantage lobbied against the Malinda's Traveling Sales Crew Protection Act, an anti-traveling sales crew bill intended to stop companies from putting their workers in dangerous and unfair conditions. The bill was passed, but in a form that applies only to sales workers who travel in groups of two or more.

=== On campus ===
Harvard University banned Southwestern from recruiting on its campus in 1977 for "irregular recruiting activities", though four years later Southwestern resumed recruiting despite this ban. In 2005, the University of Maryland banned Southwestern from recruiting on its campus; as of 2009, however, the university continued to receive complaints against the company.

In the UK University of Durham's campus in 2005, the Durham Students' Union, stating that the "Southwestern Company 'experience' is not marketed as openly as it could be, and some students may be misled", banned Southwestern from Dunelm House and mandated the union president "to liaise with Southwestern Books to work towards marketing which is clearer and to ask the company to develop its recruitment process to ensure Durham students are aware of the risks and pressures that the job entails."

The Guild of Students at the University of Birmingham passed a motion in May 2006 banning the company from its premises and encouraging the university to do the same.

In 2010, the University of Idaho announced that Southwestern Advantage is prohibited from recruiting on campus due to misconduct and violation of University and Career Center policies after several complaints were issued, which were deemed "valid" by the Campus' Career Center Director. She explained, "I don't really think students understand the implications of an independent contractor," referring to the company policy of registering student employees as independent contractors.

A non-binding motion was passed at the 2010 AGM of the Students Association at the University of Edinburgh, banning the company from all union premises.
