= Rosetta Luce Gilchrist =

American physician, writer

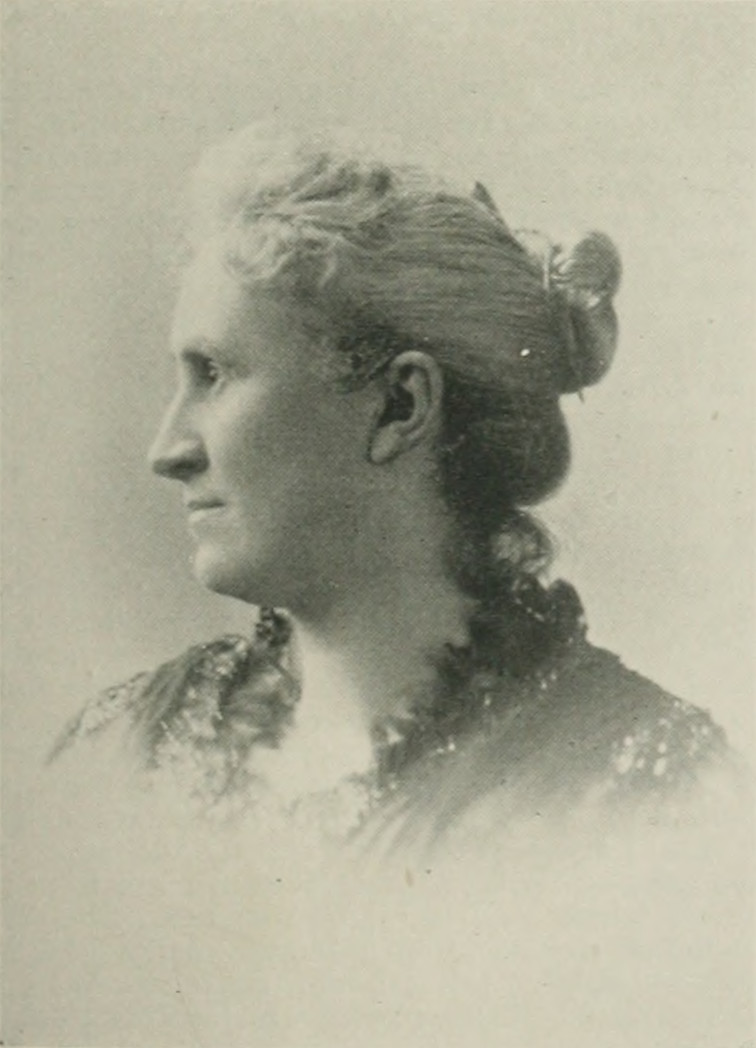
- Photo in A Woman of the Century
- Born: Rosetta Luce; April 11, 1850; Kingsville, Ashtabula County, Ohio, U.S.
- Died: February 17, 1921 (aged 70)
- Resting place: Lulu Falls Cemetery, Kingsville
- Education: Oberlin College; Cleveland Homeopathic Medical College
- Occupations: physician; author; poet
- Writing career
- Notable works: Apples of sodom; Tibby: A Novel Dealing with Psychic Forces and Telepathy

Rosetta Luce Gilchrist (née, Luce; April 11, 1850 – February 17, 1921) was an American physician, author, novelist, and poet from Ohio. After graduating from Oberlin College and the Cleveland Homeopathic Medical College, she established a successful medical practice. Gilchrist was also a prolific writer whose publications included Margaret's Sacrifice, Thistledew Papers, and the anti-Mormon novel, Apples of Sodom. Additionally, she was a correspondent for various newspapers, a self-taught oil painter, and served as the president of the Ashtabula Equal Rights Club.

== Biography ==
Rosetta Luce was born in Kingsville, Ashtabula County, Ohio, April 11, 1850. In youth, she was a student in the Kingsville, or Rexville, academy. She graduated from Oberlin College in 1870. In 1890, she graduated from the Cleveland Homeopathic Medical College.

Gilchrist was a teacher in the Cleveland public schools. After graduating from medical school, she gained a lucrative practice in the medical profession. Gilchrist also had a successful literary career. Her early work Apples of Sodom was a piece of anti-Mormon fiction. Other publications included Margaret's Sacrifice, Thistledew Papers, and numerous poems. Gilchrist served as a correspondent for various newspapers. She was a member of the Woman's National Press Association and the Cleveland Woman's Press Association and president of the Ashtabula Equal Rights Club.

Gilchrist was also a self-taught painter in oils. She had a family of three children, including a daughter, Jessamine.

Rosetta Luce Gilchrist died on February 17, 1921.

== Selected works ==
- Apples of Sodom, A Story of Mormon Life., 1883
- Tibby: A Novel Dealing with Psychic Forces and Telepathy, 1904
- Margaret's Sacrifice
- Thistledew Papers
