= Ezra B. Taylor =

American politician (1823–1912)

Ezra Booth Taylor
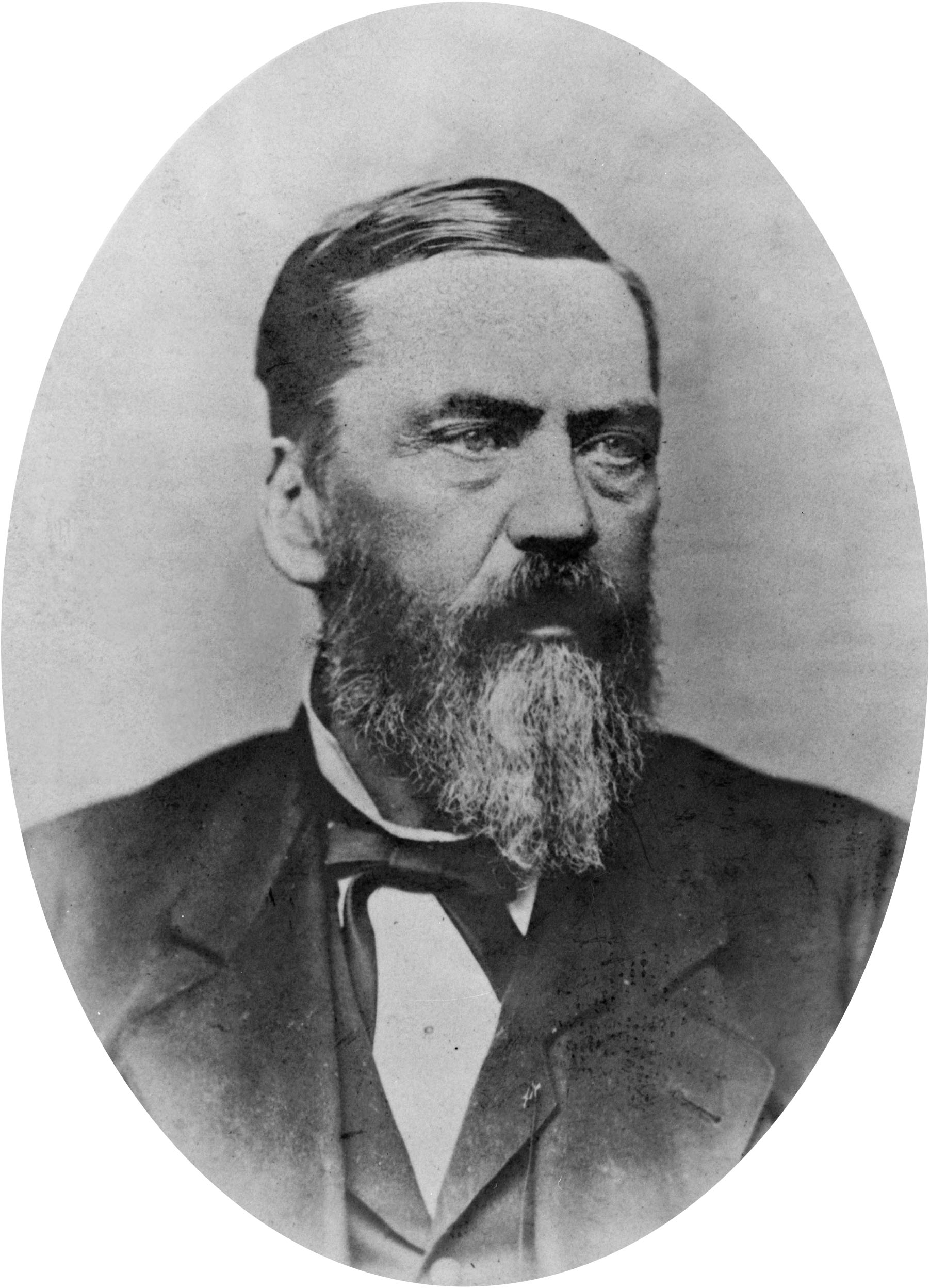
- Taylor, 1860–1890

Member of the U.S. House of Representatives from Ohio's 19th district
- In office December 13, 1880 – March 3, 1893
- Preceded by: James A. Garfield
- Succeeded by: Stephen A. Northway

Personal details
- Born: July 9, 1823 Nelson Township, Ohio
- Died: January 29, 1912 (aged 88) Warren, Ohio
- Party: Republican
- Spouse: Harriet M. Frazier
- Children: two

Ezra Booth Taylor (July 9, 1823 – January 29, 1912) was an American lawyer and politician who served as a U.S. representative from Ohio from 1880 to 1893. He won election to the congressional seat that had been vacated by James Garfield after he was elected president.

== Biography ==
Taylor was born in Nelson Township, Portage County, Ohio and attended the common and select schools and academies. He studied law and was admitted to the bar and commenced practice in Portage County in 1845. Taylor was elected prosecuting attorney in 1854 and moved to Warren, Ohio, in 1861.

=== Civil War ===
During the American Civil War, he enrolled as a private in Company A, One Hundred and Seventy-first Ohio Infantry, on April 27, 1864. He was mustered into service on May 5, 1864, and was honorably discharged on August 20, 1864.

=== Congress ===
Taylor was elected judge of the court of common pleas for the ninth judicial district of Ohio and served from March 1877 to September 1880, when he resigned.

He won a special election on November 30, 1880 as a Republican to fill the vacancy caused by the resignation of president–elect James A. Garfield. He had already been elected October 12 to the 47th Congress when Garfield retired from the seat to run for president.

Taylor was re-elected to the five succeeding Congresses and served from December 13, 1880, to March 3, 1893. He was an outspoken opponent of the Chinese Exclusion Act in 1882, arguing that Chinese immigrants were being singled out by laborers on the West Coast. He served as chairman of the Committee on the Judiciary (in the 51st Congress).

He declined to be a candidate for renomination in 1892.

=== Personal life ===
After leaving office, he resumed the practice of his profession. He died in Warren, Ohio, on January 29, 1912, and was interred in the Warren mausoleum at Oakwood Cemetery.

In 1849, Taylor was married in Ravenna to Harriet M. Frazier, who died in 1876. They had a daughter and a son. The former, Harriet Taylor Upton was a famous suffragist and author.

U.S. House of Representatives
Preceded by James A. Garfield	Member of the U.S. House of Representatives from Ohio's 19th congressional district 1880–1893	Succeeded by Stephen A. Northway
