= Anna Warner Bailey =

American revolutionary hero (1758–1851)

- Born: October 11, 1758; Groton, Connecticut, United States
- Died: January 10, 1851 (aged 92); Groton, Connecticut, United States
- Other names: Mother Bailey

Anna Warner Bailey (October 11, 1758 – January 10, 1851) was a popular American revolutionary heroine known as "Mother Bailey".

== Biography ==
Anna Warner was born in Groton, Connecticut, United states, in October 11, 1758. She was an orphan raised by her Uncle Edward Mills.

During the battle of Fort Griswold, Mills was among the soldiers. Bailey walked to the scene of the battle to find her uncle mortally wounded. Bailey returned home, saddled a horse for her aunt and then carried her baby cousin back to the fort to see Mills before he died. She also tended to other wounded combatants.

The story became a favorite story of the revolution. Bailey's future husband, Captain Elijah Bailey, was also in the battle and spent some time as a prisoner of war of the British. After the war, Captain Bailey became the postmaster of their home town. In later years, during the 1812 War against the English, Bailey again came to the aid of the soldiers defending New London from a blockading English Fleet. On being told that the soldiers were running low on cartridge wadding she took off her petticoat and told them to use that. She became a celebrity in the aftermath of the war. Bailey died in Groton on January 10, 1851, and is buried in Starr Burying Ground Cemetery, Groton, Connecticut. She is locally remembered in the chapter name of the Daughters of the American Revolution.
