= Kingsville, Ohio =

- Census-designated place
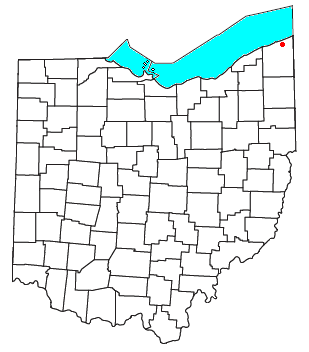
- Location of Kingsville, Ohio
- Country: United States
- State: Ohio
- County: Ashtabula
- Township: Kingsville
- Elevation: 761 ft (232 m)

Population (2020)
  - Total: 823
- Time zone: UTC-5 (Eastern (EST))
  - Summer (DST): UTC-4 (EDT)
- ZIP code: 44048
- Area code: 440
- GNIS feature ID: 2628911

Kingsville is a census-designated place in central Kingsville Township, Ashtabula County, Ohio, United States. The population was 824 at the 2020 census. It lies at the intersection of State Routes 84 and 193, less than one mile (1.6 km) northwest of Interstate 90.

== History ==
Kingsville was originally called Fobesdale or Fobesville, and under the latter name was laid out in 1810.

== In the media ==
Kingsville was a location used for the filming of The Dark Secret of Harvest Home.

== Notable people ==
- Rosetta Luce Gilchrist, physician, writer
- Adelia Cleopatra Graves, educator, author
- Jasper A. Maltby, Civil War general
