= Southwestern Family of Companies =

International conglomerate

- Type: Private
- Industry: Conglomerate
- Founded: 1855
- Founder: Rev. J. R. V. Graves
- Headquarters: Nashville, Tennessee, United States
- Key people: Henry Bedford, Chairman of the Board
- Subsidiaries: Global Educational Concepts; High School in the USA; Inspire Kindness; Pat Summitt Leadership Group; SBR Consulting; Southwestern Advantage; Southwestern Consulting; Southwestern Distribution; Southwestern Insurance Group; Southwestern Legacy; Insurance Group; Southwestern Publishing House; Southwestern; Real Estate; Southwestern Travel Group; Southwestern Ventures; ThinkingAhead
- Website: www.southwestern.com

Southwestern Family of Companies is an international, employee-owned conglomerate. It was started in 1855 as Southwestern Publishing House. In 2023, it was made up of 19 individual businesses. These businesses are in various industries including publishing, insurance, investment services, real estate, travel, business and leadership coaching, and sales.

== History ==
In 1855, Southwestern Publishing House was established in Nashville, Tennessee. The company's name was chosen because, at that time, Nashville was in the southwestern part of the United States. Founded by the Baptist minister James Robinson Graves, Southwestern originally published The Tennessee Baptist, a Southern Baptist newspaper, and religious booklets which were sold by mail for 20¢ and 30¢ each.

Before the Civil War, most bibles were printed in the North, rather than the South. Graves acquired stereotype plates from the North and began printing bibles for sale in August 1861. He also produced and sold educational books. After the 1864 Battle of Nashville resulted in a Union victory, Graves relocated to Memphis, as he felt vulnerable because of articles he had published against the North. The company resumed publishing in 1867.

In 1868, Graves discontinued the company’s mail order business, and began training young men as independent dealers to sell bibles and educational books door-to-door as a way to earn money for college. Graves retired in 1871.

In 1879 the company relocated to Nashville under the new ownership of Jacob Florida. In 1899, P. B. Jones acquired majority ownership and became President and General Manager. In 1921, J. B. Henderson, a sixteen-year veteran who started in the summer sales program became the sole owner. During the 1920s, the firm grew to one of the largest person-to-person sales companies in America.

By 1947, Southwestern had lost nearly all of its independent dealers as a result of World War II. It was rebuilt, and experienced tremendous growth as the United States rebounded from the Great Depression. The number of independent reps grew to over 1,500.

In 1959 Oldham, a 24-year veteran who started in the summer sales program, became the majority shareholder of Southwestern; his ownership role would last until 1968, and his presidential role would last until 1972. J. Fred Landers was also made 49% owner at this time and continued his career with Southwestern until he died in 1987. The Southwestern Family of Companies headquarters is named after Fred for his deep contributions to the culture of the company.

In 1968, Times-Mirror Company acquired ownership of Southwestern.

Also in 1959, Spencer Hays graduated from TCU and joined the company. He helped the company expand into selling reference books, cookbooks, and children’s books; as well as providing fundraising services, and selling hospital flooring and cancer insurance.

In 1975, Times-Mirror formed a fund-raising company called Nashville Educational Marketing Services under Southwestern, later to be renamed Great American Opportunities. Jerry Heffel became the company's president in 1980.

In 1982, Times-Mirror agreed to sell Southwestern, then a $30-million-a-year company, back to a group of company executives. Hays was named executive chairman of the board and Ralph Mosley was named chairman and CEO.

Southwestern earned position 4,832 on the Inc. 5000 list in 2012 of the fastest growing private companies in the United States.

In July 2022, Henry Bedford was named CEO when Dustin Hillis stepped down. Bedford had been with Southwestern Family of Companies for 49 years, served as chairman of the board, and previously held the CEO position.

== Current companies ==
After the leveraged buyout in 1982 from Times-Mirror that formed Southwestern Family of Companies continued to expand. The conglomerate’s businesses include consulting, financial services, real estate, and executive search. In a conglomerate, “one company owns a controlling stake in several smaller companies, conducting business separately and independently.”

=== Global Educational Concepts ===
This company is a designated sponsor of the U.S. Department of State's BridgeUSA Summer Work Travel and Internship programs. GEC also sponsors work and travel visas for international students who participate in the Southwestern Advantage summer program.

The firm is headquartered in Nashville, TN. The firm is a member of the Alliance for International Educational and Cultural Exchange.

=== High School in the USA ===
High School in the USA is an international exchange program that brings international students into United States classrooms.

=== Inspire Kindness ===
Inspire Kindness president and co-founder Dan Greene sold the company to SWFC. It creates products meant to help people make positive changes.

=== Pat Summitt Leadership Group ===
The Group helps teams, companies, and individuals grow personally and professionally using the Definite Dozen program, a 12-step guide to success created by Pat Summitt. Summitt, a former University of Tennessee women’s basketball coach, died in 2016.

=== SBR Consulting ===
This SWFC entity is based in London. The company provides sales performance consulting and was founded in 2002.

=== Southwestern Advantage ===
Since 1868, Southwestern Advantage has operated a direct marketing sales program that recruits and trains college and university students as independent contractors. The company recruits a few thousand American and a few hundred European university students to sell educational books, software, apps, and subscription websites during the summer.

=== Southwestern Consulting ===
This company consists of Southwestern Coaching, Southwestern Speakers, and Southwestern Speakers. Together, these organizations provide sales and leadership coaching services. They’ve worked with clients such as Aflac, Mercedes-Benz, and Re/Max.

=== Southwestern Distribution ===
Southwestern Distribution provides third-party logistical partnerships and full-service distribution. This includes bulk-storage, order fulfillment, and shipping services.

=== Southwestern Insurance Group ===
This company was founded in 2018 by David Stuart, an alumnus of the Southwestern Advantage internship program. The company sells term life, whole life, annuities, and products like auto and homeowners insurance.

=== Southwestern Legacy Insurance Group ===
This subsidiary was founded in 2021. It is a final expense insurance distributor and sells small life insurance policies.

=== Southwestern Publishing House ===
This company was acquired as FRP, Inc. (originally a 1961 imprint Favorite Recipes Press in 1982 by Fuller and Dees as a custom book publisher focused on cookbooks to be sold for fundraising purposes. Since that time, over 1,500 titles have been published. In 2011, it was renamed Southwestern Publishing Group.

=== Southwestern Real Estate ===
This is a residential real estate company. Patrick Roach is the president.

=== Southwestern Travel Group ===
Southwestern Travel Group is a travel agency. Terri Rickard is the president.

=== Southwestern Ventures ===
Southwestern Ventures is a European business incubator.

=== ThinkingAhead ===
This company was originally named Southwestern Business Resources and changed its name in 2012. It is a Nashville-based executive search firm founded in 1982.
