= James Robinson Graves =

American Baptist preacher, publisher, evangelist, debater, author and editor

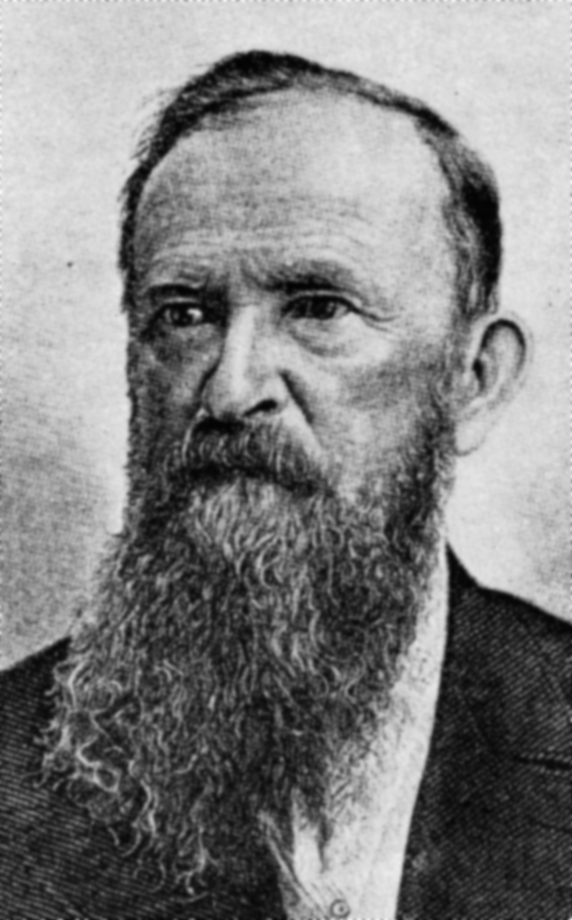
J.R. Graves

James Robinson Graves (April 10, 1820 – June 26, 1893) was an American Baptist preacher, publisher, evangelist, debater, author, and editor. He is most noted as the original founder of what is now the Southwestern family of companies. Graves was born in Chester, Vermont, the son of Z. C. Graves, and died in Memphis, Tennessee. His remains are interred in Elmwood Cemetery in Memphis.

== Career ==
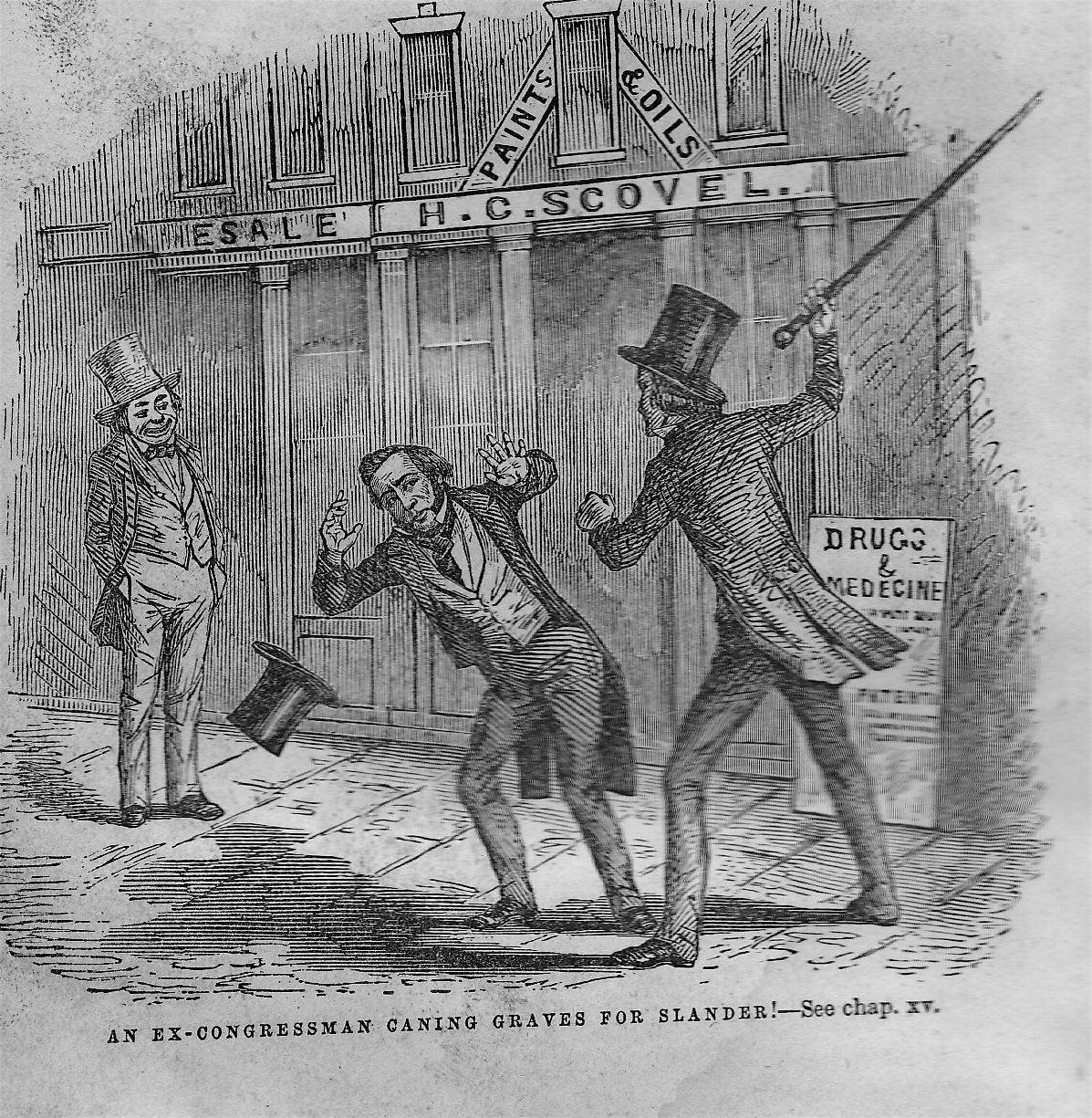
Engraving illustrating the caning of J.R. Graves by an ex-congressman in front of Scovel's drug store in Nashville for alleged slander.

In 1855, Graves established Southwestern Publishing House in Nashville, Tennessee. The company's name was chosen because, at that time, Nashville was in the southwestern part of the United States. Southwestern originally published The Tennessee Baptist, a Southern Baptist newspaper, and religious booklets which were sold by mail for 20¢ and 30¢ each.

Prior to the Civil War, most Bibles were printed in the North, rather than the Confederacy. Graves acquired stereotype plates from the North and began printing Bibles for sale in August 1861. He also produced and sold educational books. After the 1862 fall of Fort Donelson resulted in a Union victory, Graves relocated to Panola County, Mississippi, as he felt vulnerable because of articles he had published against the North. The company resumed publishing in 1867.

In 1868, Graves discontinued the company’s mail-order business, and began training young men as independent dealers to sell Bibles and educational books door-to-door as a way to earn money for college. Graves retired in 1871.

Though raised in a Congregationalist family, Graves joined a Baptist church at age 15. Contemporary fellow ministers in the Southern Baptist Convention praised his preaching abilities. Thomas Treadwell Eaton wrote, "We have seen him hold a congregation packed uncomfortably, for three hours and a half without any sign of weariness on their part. This was not done once or twice, but scores of times." Denominational leader James Bruton Gambrell described one of Graves' sermons at a small church in Mississippi as "The Greatest Sermon I Ever Heard." Scholars have recognized Graves as an early and chief promulgator of the Landmark movement. The subject's Nashville publishing house, Graves, Marks, & Co, which later became South-Western Publishing, published all of fellow 'Landmarker' Amos Cooper Dayton's books. Both were expelled as 'schismatics' between 1858 and 1859 from the Nashville First Baptist Church due to their theological perspectives on their apostolic connection.

== Personal life ==
In the 1830s, J. R. Graves’s older brother, Zuinglius Calvin Graves (1816–1902), moved to Ashtabula, Ohio to teach school. Soon mother Lois, sister Louisa and J. R. had relocated there as well. All three Graves children married while there. In 1845, J. R. Graves married Lucinda Ellen “Lua” Spencer, daughter of Dr. and Mrs. Daniel Spencer. They relocated to Nashville, Tennessee and had four children – none of whom lived to adulthood. Graves married a second time in 1856, to Louisa Jane Snider, daughter of Dr. and Mrs. George Snider of Jackson, Tennessee. They had five children. Louisa Jane Graves and Graves’s mother Lois died in 1867 during a yellow fever epidemic in Memphis, Tennessee (where they had relocated circa 1866). In 1869, Graves married Georgianna Snider, Louisa’s sister. They had three children. Georgianna died in 1932. Most of the family members are buried in Elmwood Cemetery at Memphis, Tennessee and the Nashville City Cemetery in Nashville, Tennessee.

== Bibliography ==
- The Desire of All Nations
- The Watchman's Reply
- The Trilemma
- The First Baptist Church in America
- The Great Iron Wheel
- The Little Iron Wheel
- The Bible Doctrine of the Middle Life
- Exposition of Modern Spiritism
- The Little Seraph (song book)
- Old Landmarkism, What Is It?
- The Work of Christ in Seven Dispensations
- Intercommunion Inconsistent, Unscriptural, and Productive of Evil
- What Is It To Eat and Drink Unworthily?
- John's Baptism: Was It From Moses or Christ?

== Resources ==
- Burnett, J .J., Sketches of Tennessee's Pioneer Baptist Preachers
- George, Timothy, Baptist theologians
- Hailey, O. L., J. R. Graves, life, times and teachings
- Patterson, James A. 2012. James Robinson Graves: Staking the Boundaries of Baptist Identity. B & H Academic.
