= National Guard Association of the United States =

Lobbying organization in the US

Coordinates: 38°53′53.28″N 77°0′34.51″W

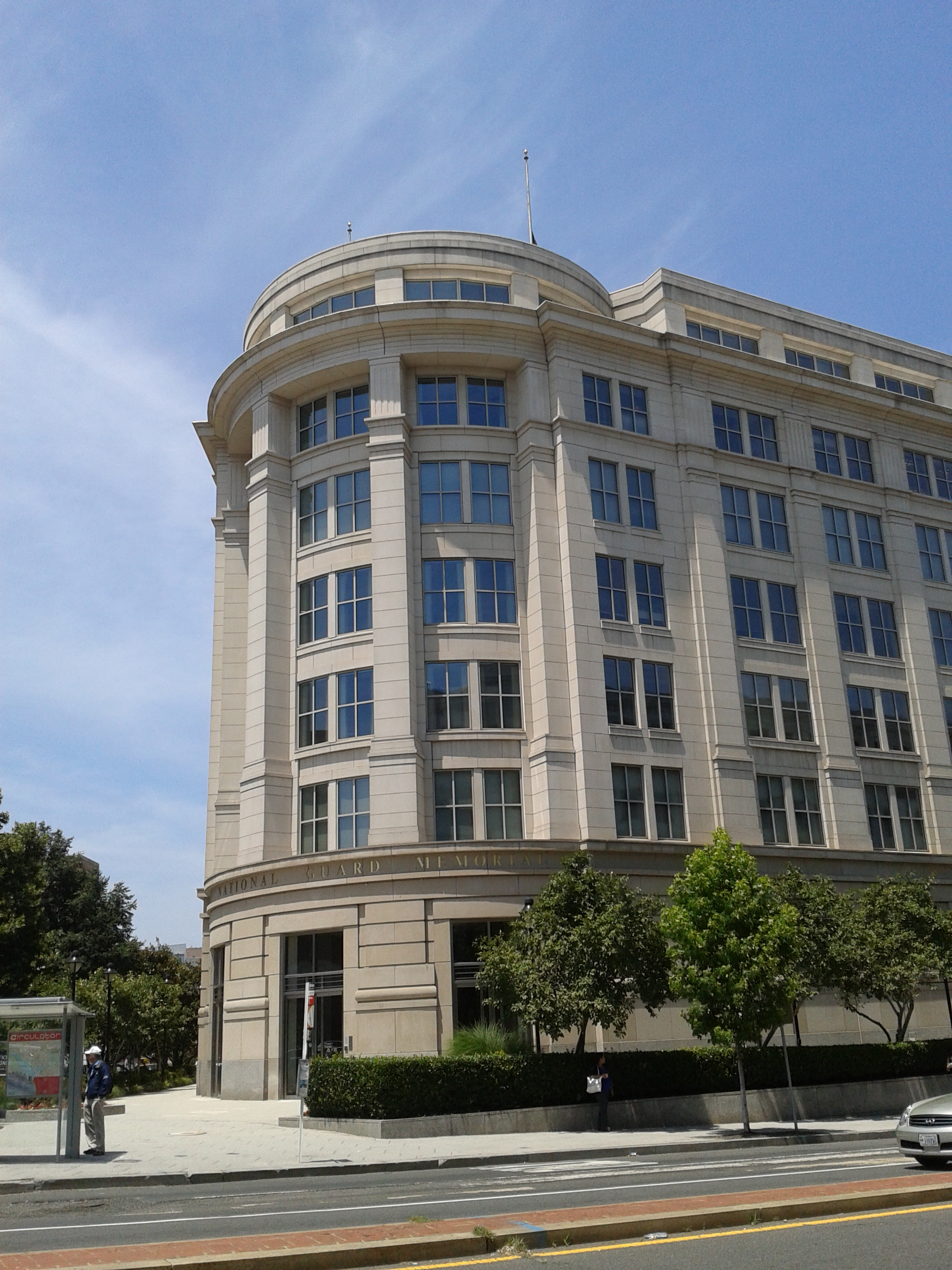
- The National Guard Memorial Building is the home of the National Guard Association of the United States
- Formation: 1878
- Headquarters: 1 Massachusetts Ave, N.W. Washington, D.C. 20001
- Chairman of the Board: Maj. Gen. Paul Rogers
- President: Maj. Gen. Francis M. McGinn (Ret.)
- Chief of Staff: Lt. Col. John Fesler (Ret.)
- Website: http://www.ngaus.org/

The National Guard Association of the United States was founded in 1878 as a congressional lobbying organization for National Guard issues. A member of the Military Coalition, NGAUS lobbies on behalf of over 400,000 officers and enlisted members who comprise the membership of the organization. It has been partially or solely responsible for winning a number of benefits, ranging from health to retirement, for National Guard forces nationwide. It also operates NGAUS Insurance Trust, which provides products to full-time federal technicians, including life insurance. It also operates the National Guard Educational Foundation, which focuses on educating the public about the National Guard.

== 1970 bombing ==
On May 10th, 1970, the Weather Underground bombed the NGAUS HQ.
