= Woman in Sacred Song =

- Woman in sacred song : a library of hymns, religious poems, and sacred music, by woman (1888 edition)
- Author: Eva Munson Smith
- Language: English
- Subject: poetry; musical compositions; biographical compilation
- Genre: hymns; religious poems; sacred music
- Publisher: D. Lothrop & Company
- Publication date: 1885
- Publication place: U.S.
- Pages: 880 quarto pages
- ISBN: 1343522196

Woman in Sacred Song : a library of hymns, religious poems, and sacred music, by woman is an illustrated book of 880 quarto pages compiled by Eva Munson Smith with preface by Frances E. Willard, first published in 1885 in Boston by D. Lothrop & Company. It contains hymns and nearly 3,000 devotional, missionary, temperance, and miscellaneous poems, the work of about 820 women in the preceding 340 years. There are brief biographies and musical settings, as well as 140 pieces of music.

The larger part of the material was the product of living women. Through exhaustive research, Smith settled questions of disputed authorship, and did coupled popular verses with the names of the writers, where the former had been started anonymously or the two had become disunited by the accidents of the press. In this work, Smith traces the advancement of woman's poetical and musical capabilities from the middle of the 17th century to the time of writing - 1885 - and shows how rapid and substantial was the advancement.

At the age of 13, Louisa May Alcott wrote the hymn, "My Kingdom". When, years afterward, Smith wrote to Alcott, asking for some poems for Woman in Sacred Song, Alcott sent her "My Kingdom", saying, "It is the only hymn I ever wrote. It was composed at thirteen, and as I still find the same difficulty in governing my kingdom, it still expresses my soul's desire, and I have nothing better to offer."

Later editions contained poems written by 830 women and 150 musical compositions by 50 different women.

In 1893, Smith was invited to deliver an address before the World's Congress of Representative Women on the topic of the same name: "Woman in Sacred Song".
