= List of United States representatives in the 55th Congress =

This is a complete list of United States representatives during the 55th United States Congress listed by seniority.

As an historical article, the districts and party affiliations listed reflect those during the 55th Congress (March 4, 1897 – March 3, 1899). Seats and party affiliations on similar lists for other congresses will be different for certain members.

Seniority depends on the date on which members were sworn into office. Since many members are sworn in on the same day, subsequent ranking is based on previous congressional service of the individual and then by alphabetical order by the last name of the representative.

Committee chairmanship in the House is often associated with seniority. However, party leadership is typically not associated with seniority.

Note: The "*" indicates that the representative/delegate may have served one or more non-consecutive terms while in the House of Representatives of the United States Congress.

== U.S. House seniority list ==
U.S. House seniority
Rank	Representative	Party	District	Seniority date (Previous service, if any)	No.# of term(s)	Notes
1	Alfred C. Harmer	R	PA-05	March 4, 1877; Previous service, 1871–1875.	13th term*	Dean of the House
2	Thomas Brackett Reed	R	ME-01	March 4, 1877	11th term	Speaker of the House
3	Henry H. Bingham	R	PA-01	March 4, 1879	10th term	
4	Benton McMillin	D	TN-04	March 4, 1879	10th term	Resigned on January 6, 1899.
5	Nelson Dingley, Jr.	R	ME-02	September 12, 1881	9th term	Died on January 13, 1899.
6	Robert R. Hitt	R	IL-09	December 4, 1882	9th term	
7	Alexander Monroe Dockery	D	MO-03	March 4, 1883	8th term	Left the House in 1899.
8	Charles A. Boutelle	R	ME-04	March 4, 1883	8th term	
9	David B. Henderson	R	IA-03	March 4, 1883	8th term	
10	Seth L. Milliken	R	ME-03	March 4, 1883	8th term	Died on April 18, 1897.
11	John Mills Allen	D	MS-01	March 4, 1885	7th term	
12	Thomas C. Catchings	D	MS-03	March 4, 1885	7th term	
13	William W. Grout	R	VT-02	March 4, 1885; Previous service, 1881–1883.	8th term*	
14	James D. Richardson	D	TN-05	March 4, 1885	7th term	
15	Joseph D. Sayers	D	TX-09	March 4, 1885	7th term	Resigned on January 16, 1899.
16	Joseph Wheeler	D	AL-08	March 4, 1885; Previous service, 1881–1882 and 1883.	9th term**	
17	Albert J. Hopkins	R	IL-08	December 7, 1885	7th term	
18	Thomas Chipman McRae	D	AR-03	December 7, 1885	7th term	
19	John H. Bankhead	D	AL-06	March 4, 1887	6th term	
20	John Dalzell	R	PA-22	March 4, 1887	6th term	
21	Charles Addison Russell	R	CT-03	March 4, 1887	6th term	
22	Samuel Matthews Robertson	D	LA-06	December 5, 1887	6th term	
23	Marriott Henry Brosius	R	PA-10	March 4, 1889	5th term	
24	Jonathan P. Dolliver	R	IA-10	March 4, 1889	5th term	
25	Rufus E. Lester	D	GA-01	March 4, 1889	5th term	
26	George W. Smith	R	IL-22	March 4, 1889	5th term	
27	Joseph H. Walker	R	MA-03	March 4, 1889	5th term	Left the House in 1899.
28	Sereno E. Payne	R	NY-28	December 2, 1889; Previous service, 1883–1887.	7th term*	
29	Charles Warren Stone	R	PA-27	November 4, 1890	5th term	Left the House in 1899.
30	Joseph Weldon Bailey	D	TX-05	March 4, 1891	4th term	
31	Case Broderick	R	KS-01	March 4, 1891	4th term	Left the House in 1899.
32	Nicholas N. Cox	D	TN-07	March 4, 1891	4th term	
33	David A. De Armond	D	MO-06	March 4, 1891	4th term	
34	Warren B. Hooker	R	NY-34	March 4, 1891	4th term	Resigned on November 10, 1898.
35	John A. T. Hull	R	IA-07	March 4, 1891	4th term	
36	Henry U. Johnson	R	IN-06	March 4, 1891	4th term	Left the House in 1899.
37	Martin N. Johnson	R	ND	March 4, 1891	4th term	Left the House in 1899.
38	William Atkinson Jones	D	VA-01	March 4, 1891	4th term	
39	Leonidas F. Livingston	D	GA-05	March 4, 1891	4th term	
40	Eugene F. Loud	R	CA-05	March 4, 1891	4th term	
41	Adolph Meyer	D	LA-01	March 4, 1891	4th term	
42	George D. Perkins	R	IA-11	March 4, 1891	4th term	Left the House in 1899.
43	H. Henry Powers	R	VT-01	March 4, 1891	4th term	
44	George W. Ray	R	NY-26	March 4, 1891; Previous service, 1883–1885.	5th term*	
45	William A. Stone	R	PA-23	March 4, 1891	4th term	Resigned on November 9, 1898.
46	William L. Terry	D	AR-04	March 4, 1891	4th term	
47	James Wolcott Wadsworth	R	NY-30	March 4, 1891; Previous service, 1881–1885.	6th term*	
48	John L. McLaurin	D	SC-06	December 5, 1892	4th term	Resigned on May 31, 1897.
49	Joseph W. Babcock	R	WI-03	March 4, 1893	3rd term	
50	Richard Bartholdt	R	MO-10	March 4, 1893	3rd term	
51	John Calhoun Bell	P	CO-02	March 4, 1893	3rd term	
52	Albert S. Berry	D	KY-06	March 4, 1893	3rd term	
53	Joseph Gurney Cannon	R	IL-12	March 4, 1893; Previous service, 1873–1891.	12th term*	
54	Charles A. Chickering	R	NY-24	March 4, 1893	3rd term	
55	Henry Allen Cooper	R	WI-01	March 4, 1893	3rd term	
56	Samuel B. Cooper	D	TX-02	March 4, 1893	3rd term	
57	Robert G. Cousins	R	IA-05	March 4, 1893	3rd term	
58	Charles Curtis	R	KS-04	March 4, 1893	3rd term	
59	Hugh A. Dinsmore	D	AR-05	March 4, 1893	3rd term	
60	William R. Ellis	R	OR-02	March 4, 1893	3rd term	Left the House in 1899.
61	Loren Fletcher	R	MN-05	March 4, 1893	3rd term	
62	John J. Gardner	R	NJ-02	March 4, 1893	3rd term	
63	Charles W. Gillet	R	NY-29	March 4, 1893	3rd term	
64	Frederick H. Gillett	R	MA-02	March 4, 1893	3rd term	
65	Charles H. Grosvenor	R	OH-11	March 4, 1893; Previous service, 1885–1891.	6th term*	
66	Alva L. Hager	R	IA-09	March 4, 1893	3rd term	Left the House in 1899.
67	Charles S. Hartman	R	MT	March 4, 1893	3rd term	Left the House in 1899.
68	William Peters Hepburn	R	IA-08	March 4, 1893; Previous service, 1881–1887.	6th term*	
69	Josiah Duane Hicks	R	PA-20	March 4, 1893	3rd term	Left the House in 1899.
70	John F. Lacey	R	IA-06	March 4, 1893; Previous service, 1889–1891.	4th term*	
71	Asbury Latimer	D	SC-03	March 4, 1893	3rd term	
72	Henry C. Loudenslager	R	NJ-01	March 4, 1893	3rd term	
73	John W. Maddox	D	GA-07	March 4, 1893	3rd term	
74	James G. Maguire	D	CA-04	March 4, 1893	3rd term	Left the House in 1899.
75	Thaddeus Maclay Mahon	R	PA-18	March 4, 1893	3rd term	
76	Benjamin F. Marsh	R	IL-15	March 4, 1893; Previous service, 1877–1883.	6th term*	
77	Samuel W. McCall	R	MA-08	March 4, 1893	3rd term	
78	James McCleary	R	MN-02	March 4, 1893	3rd term	
79	Philip D. McCulloch, Jr.	D	AR-01	March 4, 1893	3rd term	
80	David Henry Mercer	R	NE-02	March 4, 1893	3rd term	
81	Francis G. Newlands	D	NV	March 4, 1893	3rd term	
82	Stephen A. Northway	R	OH-19	March 4, 1893	3rd term	Died on September 8, 1898.
83	James S. Sherman	R	NY-25	March 4, 1893; Previous service, 1887–1891.	5th term*	
84	Jesse F. Stallings	D	AL-02	March 4, 1893	3rd term	
86	Thomas J. Strait	D	SC-05	March 4, 1893	3rd term	Left the House in 1899.
87	Claude A. Swanson	D	VA-05	March 4, 1893	3rd term	
88	W. Jasper Talbert	D	SC-02	March 4, 1893	3rd term	
89	Farish Carter Tate	D	GA-09	March 4, 1893	3rd term	
90	James Albertus Tawney	R	MN-01	March 4, 1893	3rd term	
91	Thomas Updegraff	R	IA-04	March 4, 1893; Previous service, 1879–1883.	5th term*	Left the House in 1899.
92	H. Clay Van Voorhis	R	OH-15	March 4, 1893	3rd term	
93	Irving Price Wanger	R	PA-07	March 4, 1893	3rd term	
94	John Sharp Williams	D	MS-05	March 4, 1893	3rd term	
95	Ashley B. Wright	R	MA-01	March 4, 1893	3rd term	Died on August 14, 1897.
96	Robert Adams, Jr.	R	PA-02	December 19, 1893	3rd term	
97	Lemuel E. Quigg	R	NY-14	January 30, 1894	3rd term	Left the House in 1899.
98	Galusha A. Grow	R	PA	February 26, 1894; Previous service, 1851–1863.	9th term*	
99	Henry Warren Ogden	D	LA-04	May 12, 1894	3rd term	Left the House in 1899.
100	Michael Griffin	R	WI-07	November 5, 1894	3rd term	Left the House in 1899.
101	Jacob H. Bromwell	R	OH-02	December 3, 1894	3rd term	
102	John Sebastian Little	D	AR-02	December 3, 1894	3rd term	
103	Ernest F. Acheson	R	PA-24	March 4, 1895	2nd term	
104	William Carlile Arnold	R	PA-28	March 4, 1895	2nd term	Left the House in 1899.
105	William Benjamin Baker	R	MD-02	March 4, 1895	2nd term	
106	John All Barham	R	CA-01	March 4, 1895	2nd term	
107	Samuel S. Barney	R	WI-05	March 4, 1895	2nd term	
108	William Emerson Barrett	R	MA-07	March 4, 1895	2nd term	Left the House in 1899.
109	Charles Lafayette Bartlett	D	GA-06	March 4, 1895	2nd term	
110	Clifton B. Beach	R	OH-20	March 4, 1895	2nd term	
111	Charles G. Bennett	R	NY-05	March 4, 1895	2nd term	Left the House in 1899.
112	Roswell P. Bishop	R	MI-09	March 4, 1895	2nd term	
113	Henry C. Brewster	R	NY-31	March 4, 1895	2nd term	Left the House in 1899.
114	Charles N. Brumm	R	PA-13	March 4, 1895; Previous service, 1881–1889.	6th term*	Left the House in 1899.
115	Melville Bull	R	RI-01	March 4, 1895	2nd term	
116	Theodore E. Burton	R	OH-21	March 4, 1895; Previous service, 1889–1891.	3rd term*	
117	John Daniel Clardy	D	KY-02	March 4, 1895	2nd term	Left the House in 1899.
118	Samuel M. Clark	R	IA-01	March 4, 1895	2nd term	Left the House in 1899.
119	David Grant Colson	R	KY-11	March 4, 1895	2nd term	Left the House in 1899.
120	James A. Connolly	R	IL-17	March 4, 1895	2nd term	Left the House in 1899.
121	Edward D. Cooke	R	IL-06	March 4, 1895	2nd term	Died on June 24, 1897.
122	John Blaisdell Corliss	R	MI-01	March 4, 1895	2nd term	
123	Rousseau Owen Crump	R	MI-10	March 4, 1895	2nd term	
124	George M. Curtis	R	IA-02	March 4, 1895	2nd term	Left the House in 1899.
125	Lorenzo Danford	R	OH-16	March 4, 1895; Previous service, 1873–1879.	5th term*	
126	Alston G. Dayton	R	WV-02	March 4, 1895	2nd term	
127	Charles Dorr	R	WV-03	March 4, 1895	2nd term	Left the House in 1899.
128	Blackburn B. Dovener	R	WV-01	March 4, 1895	2nd term	
129	Frank Eddy	R	MN-07	March 4, 1895	2nd term	
130	Walter Evans	R	KY-05	March 4, 1895	2nd term	Left the House in 1899.
131	George W. Faris	R	IN-05	March 4, 1895	2nd term	
132	Lucien J. Fenton	R	OH-10	March 4, 1895	2nd term	Left the House in 1899.
133	Israel F. Fischer	R	NY-04	March 4, 1895	2nd term	Left the House in 1899.
134	John F. Fitzgerald	D	MA-09	March 4, 1895	2nd term	
135	Wallace T. Foote, Jr.	R	NY-23	March 4, 1895	2nd term	Left the House in 1899.
136	George Edmund Foss	R	IL-07	March 4, 1895	2nd term	
137	Charles N. Fowler	R	NJ-08	March 4, 1895	2nd term	
138	Henry R. Gibson	R	TN-02	March 4, 1895	2nd term	
139	Joseph V. Graff	R	IL-14	March 4, 1895	2nd term	
140	Joel Heatwole	R	MN-03	March 4, 1895	2nd term	
141	James A. Hemenway	R	IN-01	March 4, 1895	2nd term	
142	Charles L. Henry	R	IN-08	March 4, 1895	2nd term	Left the House in 1899.
143	E. Stevens Henry	R	CT-01	March 4, 1895	2nd term	
144	Samuel G. Hilborn	R	CA-03	March 4, 1895; Previous service, 1892–1894.	4th term*	Left the House in 1899.
145	Ebenezer J. Hill	R	CT-04	March 4, 1895	2nd term	
146	Milford W. Howard	P	AL-07	March 4, 1895	2nd term	Left the House in 1899.
147	James R. Howe	R	NY-06	March 4, 1895	2nd term	Left the House in 1899.
148	Benjamin Franklin Howell	R	NJ-03	March 4, 1895	2nd term	
149	Denis M. Hurley	R	NY-02	March 4, 1895	2nd term	Died on February 26, 1899.
150	John J. Jenkins	R	WI-10	March 4, 1895	2nd term	
151	Charles Frederick Joy	R	MO-11	March 4, 1895; Previous service, 1893–1894.	3rd term*	
152	Winfield S. Kerr	R	OH-14	March 4, 1895	2nd term	
153	William Shadrach Knox	R	MA-05	March 4, 1895	2nd term	
154	Monroe Henry Kulp	R	PA-17	March 4, 1895	2nd term	Left the House in 1899.
155	Romulus Zachariah Linney	R	NC-08	March 4, 1895	2nd term	
156	William Lorimer	R	IL-02	March 4, 1895	2nd term	
157	Philip B. Low	R	NY-15	March 4, 1895	2nd term	Left the House in 1899.
158	Rowland B. Mahany	R	NY-32	March 4, 1895	2nd term	Left the House in 1899.
159	Thomas McEwan, Jr.	R	NJ-07	March 4, 1895	2nd term	Left the House in 1899.
160	George B. McClellan, Jr.	D	NY-12	March 4, 1895	2nd term	
161	Warren Miller	R	WV-04	March 4, 1895	2nd term	Left the House in 1899.
162	Edward S. Minor	R	WI-08	March 4, 1895	2nd term	
163	Benjamin Barker Odell, Jr.	R	NY-17	March 4, 1895	2nd term	Left the House in 1899.
164	Peter J. Otey	D	VA-06	March 4, 1895	2nd term	
165	Theobald Otjen	R	WI-04	March 4, 1895	2nd term	
166	Jesse Overstreet	R	IN-07	March 4, 1895	2nd term	
167	Richard W. Parker	R	NJ-06	March 4, 1895	2nd term	
168	Richmond Pearson	R	NC-09	March 4, 1895	2nd term	Left the House in 1899.
169	Mahlon Pitney	R	NJ-04	March 4, 1895	2nd term	Resigned on January 10, 1899.
170	Samuel Johnson Pugh	R	KY-09	March 4, 1895	2nd term	
171	Walter Reeves	R	IL-11	March 4, 1895	2nd term	
172	Lemuel W. Royse	R	IN-13	March 4, 1895	2nd term	Left the House in 1899.
173	Edward Sauerhering	R	WI-02	March 4, 1895	2nd term	Left the House in 1899.
174	John F. Shafroth	R	CO-01	March 4, 1895	2nd term	
175	Richard C. Shannon	R	NY-13	March 4, 1895	2nd term	Left the House in 1899.
176	Alonzo C. Shuford	P	NC-07	March 4, 1895	2nd term	Left the House in 1899.
177	John Simpkins	R	MA-13	March 4, 1895	2nd term	Died on March 27, 1898.
178	Harry Skinner	P	NC-01	March 4, 1895	2nd term	Left the House in 1899.
179	William Alden Smith	R	MI-05	March 4, 1895	2nd term	
180	Horace G. Snover	R	MI-07	March 4, 1895	2nd term	Left the House in 1899.
181	James H. Southard	R	OH-09	March 4, 1895	2nd term	
182	George N. Southwick	R	NY-20	March 4, 1895	2nd term	Left the House in 1899.
183	George Spalding	R	MI-02	March 4, 1895	2nd term	Left the House in 1899.
184	Stephen M. Sparkman	D	FL-01	March 4, 1895	2nd term	
185	Nehemiah D. Sperry	R	CT-02	March 4, 1895	2nd term	
186	George Washington Steele	R	IN-11	March 4, 1895; Previous service, 1881–1889.	6th term*	
187	Alexander Stewart	R	WI-09	March 4, 1895	2nd term	
188	James F. Stewart	R	NJ-05	March 4, 1895	2nd term	
189	Jesse Burr Strode	R	NE-01	March 4, 1895	2nd term	Left the House in 1899.
190	William Franklin Strowd	P	NC-04	March 4, 1895	2nd term	Left the House in 1899.
191	Cyrus A. Sulloway	R	NH-01	March 4, 1895	2nd term	
192	William Sulzer	D	NY-11	March 4, 1895	2nd term	
193	Robert Walker Tayler	R	OH-18	March 4, 1895	2nd term	
194	James A. Walker	R	VA-09	March 4, 1895	2nd term	Left the House in 1899.
195	Vespasian Warner	R	IL-13	March 4, 1895	2nd term	
196	George E. White	R	IL-05	March 4, 1895	2nd term	Left the House in 1899.
197	David F. Wilber	R	NY-21	March 4, 1895	2nd term	Left the House in 1899.
198	Francis H. Wilson	R	NY-03	March 4, 1895	2nd term	Resigned on September 30, 1897.
199	Stanyarne Wilson	D	SC-04	March 4, 1895	2nd term	
200	Amos J. Cummings	D	NY-10	November 5, 1895; Previous service, 1887–1889 and 1889–1894.	6th term**	
201	William Henry Moody	R	MA-06	November 5, 1895	2nd term	
202	James Hodge Codding	R	PA-15	November 5, 1895	2nd term	Left the House in 1899.
203	George W. Prince	R	IL-10	December 2, 1895	2nd term	
204	Hugh R. Belknap	R	IL-03	December 27, 1895	2nd term	Left the House in 1899.
205	Rudolph Kleberg	D	TX-11	April 7, 1896	2nd term	
206	John M. Mitchell	R	NY-08	June 2, 1896	2nd term	Left the House in 1899.
207	Charles H. Martin	P	NC-06	June 5, 1896	2nd term	Left the House in 1899.
208	J. William Stokes	D	SC-07	November 3, 1896; Previous service, 1895–1896.	3rd term*	
209	William C. Adamson	D	GA-04	March 4, 1897	1st term	
210	De Alva S. Alexander	R	NY-33	March 4, 1897	1st term	
211	Samuel T. Baird	D	LA-05	March 4, 1897	1st term	Left the House in 1899.
212	Jehu Baker	D	IL-21	March 4, 1897; Previous service, 1865–1869 and 1887–1889.	4th term**	Left the House in 1899.
213	Thomas Henry Ball	D	TX-01	March 4, 1897	1st term	
214	Isaac Ambrose Barber	R	MD-01	March 4, 1897	1st term	Left the House in 1899.
215	Charles A. Barlow	P	CA-06	March 4, 1897	1st term	Left the House in 1899.
216	Samuel J. Barrows	R	MA-10	March 4, 1897	1st term	Left the House in 1899.
217	James J. Belden	R	NY-27	March 4, 1897; Previous service, 1887–1895.	5th term*	Left the House in 1899.
218	Joseph M. Belford	R	NY-01	March 4, 1897	1st term	Left the House in 1899.
219	George Jacob Benner	D	PA-19	March 4, 1897	1st term	Left the House in 1899.
220	Maecenas Eason Benton	D	MO-15	March 4, 1897	1st term	
221	Richard P. Bland	D	MO-08	March 4, 1897; Previous service, 1873–1895.	12th term*	
222	Robert N. Bodine	D	MO-02	March 4, 1897	1st term	Left the House in 1899.
223	William Samuel Booze	R	MD-03	March 4, 1897	1st term	Left the House in 1899.
224	Jeremiah D. Botkin	P	KS	March 4, 1897	1st term	Left the House in 1899.
225	Thomas J. Bradley	D	NY-09	March 4, 1897	1st term	
226	William Gordon Brantley	D	GA-11	March 4, 1897	1st term	
227	John Lewis Brenner	D	OH-03	March 4, 1897	1st term	
228	Willis Brewer	D	AL-05	March 4, 1897	1st term	
229	Robert F. Broussard	D	LA-03	March 4, 1897	1st term	
230	Seth W. Brown	R	OH-06	March 4, 1897	1st term	
231	Walter Brownlow	R	TN-01	March 4, 1897	1st term	
232	Ferdinand Brucker	D	MI-08	March 4, 1897	1st term	Left the House in 1899.
233	Stephen Brundidge, Jr.	D	AR-06	March 4, 1897	1st term	
234	Robert E. Burke	D	TX-06	March 4, 1897	1st term	
235	Thomas S. Butler	R	PA-06	March 4, 1897	1st term	
236	James R. Campbell	D	IL-20	March 4, 1897	1st term	Left the House in 1899.
237	Edward W. Carmack	D	TN-10	March 4, 1897	1st term	
238	Adin B. Capron	R	RI-02	March 4, 1897	1st term	
239	Curtis H. Castle	P	CA-07	March 4, 1897	1st term	Left the House in 1899.
240	Champ Clark	D	MO-09	March 4, 1897; Previous service, 1893–1895.	2nd term*	
241	Frank Gay Clarke	R	NH-02	March 4, 1897	1st term	
242	Charles F. Cochran	D	MO-04	March 4, 1897	1st term	
243	Aaron Van Schaick Cochrane	R	NY-19	March 4, 1897	1st term	
244	William Connell	R	PA-11	March 4, 1897	1st term	
245	James Cooney	D	MO-07	March 4, 1897	1st term	
246	William S. Cowherd	D	MO-05	March 4, 1897	1st term	
247	John W. Cranford	D	TX-04	March 4, 1897	1st term	Died on March 3, 1899.
248	Edgar D. Crumpacker	R	IN-10	March 4, 1897	1st term	
249	Samuel Arza Davenport	R	PA	March 4, 1897	1st term	
250	Robert C. Davey	D	LA-02	March 4, 1897; Previous service, 1893–1895.	2nd term*	
251	James H. Davidson	R	WI-06	March 4, 1897	1st term	
252	Robert Wyche Davis	D	FL-02	March 4, 1897	1st term	
253	George M. Davison	R	KY-08	March 4, 1897	1st term	Left the House in 1899.
254	Reese C. De Graffenreid	D	TX-03	March 4, 1897	1st term	
255	Henry De Lamar Clayton, Jr.	D	AL-03	March 4, 1897	1st term	
256	Marion De Vries	D	CA-02	March 4, 1897	1st term	
257	William Elliott	D	SC-01	March 4, 1897; Previous service, 1887–1890, 1891–1893 and 1895–1896.	5th term***	
258	Sidney Parham Epes	D	VA-04	March 4, 1897	1st term	Resigned on March 23, 1898.
259	Daniel Ermentrout	D	PA-09	March 4, 1897; Previous service, 1881–1889.	5th term*	
260	Thomas Y. Fitzpatrick	D	KY-10	March 4, 1897	1st term	
261	William Henry Fleming	D	GA-10	March 4, 1897	1st term	
262	John Edgar Fowler	P	NC-03	March 4, 1897	1st term	Left the House in 1899.
263	Andrew F. Fox	D	MS-04	March 4, 1897	1st term	
264	John W. Gaines	D	TN-06	March 4, 1897	1st term	
265	William Laury Greene	P	NE-06	March 4, 1897	1st term	
266	James M. Griggs	D	GA-02	March 4, 1897	1st term	
267	James Gunn	P	ID	March 4, 1897	1st term	Left the House in 1899.
268	Edward L. Hamilton	R	MI-04	March 4, 1897	1st term	
269	L. Irving Handy	D	DE	March 4, 1897	1st term	Left the House in 1899.
270	James Hay	D	VA-07	March 4, 1897	1st term	
271	Robert B. Hawley	R	TX-10	March 4, 1897	1st term	
272	Patrick Henry	D	MS-07	March 4, 1897	1st term	
274	Robert Lee Henry	D	TX-07	March 4, 1897	1st term	
275	William H. Hinrichsen	D	IL-16	March 4, 1897	1st term	Left the House in 1899.
276	William S. Holman	D	IN-04	March 4, 1897; Previous service, 1859–1865, 1867–1877 and 1881–1895.	16th term***	Died on April 22, 1897.
277	William Marcellus Howard	D	GA-08	March 4, 1897	1st term	
278	Andrew J. Hunter	D	IL-19	March 4, 1897; Previous service, 1893–1895.	2nd term*	Left the House in 1899.
279	Thomas M. Jett	D	IL-18	March 4, 1897	1st term	
280	William Carey Jones	R	WA	March 4, 1897	1st term	Left the House in 1899.
281	John Edward Kelley	P	SD	March 4, 1897	1st term	Left the House in 1899.
282	John H. Ketcham	R	NY-18	March 4, 1897; Previous service, 1865–1873 and 1877–1893.	13th term**	
283	William H. King	D	UT	March 4, 1897	1st term	Left the House in 1899.
284	William Sebring Kirkpatrick	R	PA-08	March 4, 1897	1st term	Left the House in 1899.
285	William Walton Kitchin	D	NC-05	March 4, 1897	1st term	
286	Freeman T. Knowles	P	SD	March 4, 1897	1st term	Left the House in 1899.
287	John Lamb	D	VA-03	March 4, 1897	1st term	
288	Charles B. Landis	R	IN-09	March 4, 1897	1st term	
289	S. W. T. Lanham	D	TX-08	March 4, 1897; Previous service, 1883–1893.	6th term*	
290	John J. Lentz	D	OH-12	March 4, 1897	1st term	
291	Elijah B. Lewis	D	GA-03	March 4, 1897	1st term	
292	J. Hamilton Lewis	D	WA	March 4, 1897	1st term	Left the House in 1899.
293	Lucius Littauer	R	NY-22	March 4, 1897	1st term	
294	William F. Love	D	MS-06	March 4, 1897	1st term	Died on October 16, 1898.
295	William C. Lovering	R	MA-12	March 4, 1897	1st term	
296	Archibald Lybrand	R	OH-08	March 4, 1897	1st term	
297	James R. Mann	R	IL-01	March 4, 1897	1st term	
298	George Alexander Marshall	D	OH-04	March 4, 1897	1st term	Left the House in 1899.
299	Samuel Maxwell	P	NE-03	March 4, 1897	1st term	Left the House in 1899.
300	William McAleer	D	PA-03	March 4, 1897; Previous service, 1891–1895.	3rd term*	
301	Nelson B. McCormick	P	KS-06	March 4, 1897	1st term	Left the House in 1899.
302	John McDonald	R	MD-06	March 4, 1897	1st term	Left the House in 1899.
303	John A. McDowell	D	OH-17	March 4, 1897	1st term	
304	William Watson McIntire	R	MD-04	March 4, 1897	1st term	Left the House in 1899.
305	David Meekison	D	OH-05	March 4, 1897	1st term	
306	William S. Mesick	R	MI-11	March 4, 1897	1st term	
307	Robert W. Miers	D	IN-02	March 4, 1897	1st term	
308	Daniel W. Mills	R	IL-04	March 4, 1897	1st term	Left the House in 1899.
309	John A. Moon	D	TN-03	March 4, 1897	1st term	
310	Robert P. Morris	R	MN-06	March 4, 1897	1st term	
311	Sydney Emanuel Mudd I	R	MD-05	March 4, 1897; Previous service, 1890–1891.	2nd term*	
312	James A. Norton	D	OH-13	March 4, 1897	1st term	
313	Marlin Edgar Olmsted	R	PA-14	March 4, 1897	1st term	
314	John Eugene Osborne	D	WY	March 4, 1897	1st term	Left the House in 1899.
315	Horace Billings Packer	R	PA-16	March 4, 1897	1st term	
316	Charles Edward Pearce	R	MO-12	March 4, 1897	1st term	
317	Mason S. Peters	P	KS-02	March 4, 1897	1st term	Left the House in 1899.
318	Rice Alexander Pierce	D	TN-09	March 4, 1897; Previous service, 1883–1885 and 1889–1893.	4th term**	
319	Thomas S. Plowman	D	AL-04	March 4, 1897	1st term	Resigned on February 9, 1898.
320	John Stockdale Rhea	D	KY-03	March 4, 1897	1st term	
321	Edwin R. Ridgely	P	KS-03	March 4, 1897	1st term	
322	John Franklin Rixey	D	VA-08	March 4, 1897	1st term	
323	Edward Robb	D	MO-13	March 4, 1897	1st term	
324	Edward Everett Robbins	R	PA-21	March 4, 1897	1st term	Left the House in 1899.
325	James M. Robinson	D	IN-12	March 4, 1897	1st term	
326	Evan E. Settle	D	KY-07	March 4, 1897	1st term	
327	William B. Shattuc	R	OH-01	March 4, 1897	1st term	
328	Carlos D. Shelden	R	MI-12	March 4, 1897	1st term	
329	Jerry Simpson	P	KS-07	March 4, 1897; Previous service, 1891–1895.	3rd term*	Left the House in 1899.
330	Thetus W. Sims	D	TN-08	March 4, 1897	1st term	
331	James Luther Slayden	D	TX-12	March 4, 1897	1st term	
332	David Highbaugh Smith	D	KY-04	March 4, 1897	1st term	
333	Samuel William Smith	R	MI-06	March 4, 1897	1st term	
334	Charles F. Sprague	R	MA-11	March 4, 1897	1st term	
335	William Ledyard Stark	P	NE-04	March 4, 1897	1st term	
336	John Hall Stephens	D	TX-13	March 4, 1897	1st term	
337	Frederick Stevens	R	MN-04	March 4, 1897	1st term	
338	John Cirby Sturtevant	R	PA-26	March 4, 1897	1st term	Left the House in 1899.
339	William V. Sullivan	D	MS-02	March 4, 1897	1st term	Resigned on May 31, 1898.
340	Roderick Dhu Sutherland	P	NE-05	March 4, 1897	1st term	
341	George W. Taylor	D	AL-01	March 4, 1897	1st term	
342	Albert M. Todd	D	MI-03	March 4, 1897	1st term	Left the House in 1899.
343	Thomas H. Tongue	R	OR-01	March 4, 1897	1st term	
344	Willard Duncan Vandiver	D	MO-14	March 4, 1897	1st term	
345	William D. Vincent	P	KS-05	March 4, 1897	1st term	Left the House in 1899.
346	Oscar Underwood	D	AL-09	March 4, 1897; Previous service, 1895–1896.	2nd term*	
347	John H. G. Vehslage	D	NY-07	March 4, 1897	1st term	Left the House in 1899.
348	William L. Ward	R	NY-16	March 4, 1897	1st term	Left the House in 1899.
349	Walter L. Weaver	R	OH-07	March 4, 1897	1st term	
350	George W. Weymouth	R	MA-04	March 4, 1897	1st term	
351	Charles K. Wheeler	D	KY-01	March 4, 1897	1st term	
352	George Henry White	R	NC-02	March 4, 1897	1st term	
353	Morgan B. Williams	R	PA-12	March 4, 1897	1st term	Left the House in 1899.
354	Jacob Yost	D	VA-10	March 4, 1897; Previous service, 1887–1889.	2nd term*	Left the House in 1899.
355	James R. Young	R	PA-04	March 4, 1897	1st term	
356	William Albin Young	D	VA-02	March 4, 1897	1st term	Resigned on April 26, 1898.
357	William T. Zenor	D	IN-03	March 4, 1897	1st term	
	Joseph Baltzell Showalter	R	PA-25	April 20, 1897	1st term	
	James Tilghman Lloyd	D	MO-01	June 1, 1897	1st term	
	Edwin C. Burleigh	R	ME-03	June 21, 1897	1st term	
	George P. Lawrence	R	MA-01	November 2, 1897	1st term	
	Henry Sherman Boutell	R	IL-06	November 23, 1897	1st term	
	Edmund H. Driggs	D	NY-03	December 6, 1897	1st term	
	Francis M. Griffith	D	IN-04	December 6, 1897	1st term	
	James Norton	D	SC-06	December 6, 1897	1st term	
	William F. Aldrich	R	AL-04	February 9, 1898; Previous service, 1896–1897.	2nd term*	Left the House in 1899.
	Robert Taylor Thorp	R	VA-04	March 23, 1898; Previous service, 1896–1897.	2nd term*	Left the House in 1899.
	Richard Alsop Wise	R	VA-02	April 26, 1898	1st term	Left the House in 1899.
	William S. Greene	R	MA-13	May 31, 1898	1st term	
	Thomas Spight	D	MS-02	July 5, 1898	1st term	
	Charles W. F. Dick	R	OH-19	November 8, 1898	1st term	
	William Harrison Graham	R	PA-23	November 29, 1898	1st term	
	Frank A. McLain	D	MS-06	December 12, 1898	1st term	

== Delegates ==
Rank	Delegate	Party	District	Seniority date (Previous service, if any)	No.# of term(s)	Notes
1	Marcus A. Smith	D	AZ	March 4, 1897; Previous service, 1887–1895.	5th term*	
2	James Yancy Callahan	FS	OK	March 4, 1897	1st term	
3	Harvey B. Fergusson	D	NM	March 4, 1897	1st term	

== See also ==
- 55th United States Congress
- List of United States congressional districts
- List of United States senators in the 55th Congress
