= List of United States senators in the 55th Congress =

This is a complete list of United States senators during the 55th United States Congress listed by seniority from March 4, 1897, to March 3, 1899.

Order of service is based on the commencement of the senator's first term. Behind this is former service as a senator (only giving the senator seniority within their new incoming class), service as vice president, a House member, a cabinet secretary, or a governor of a state. The final factor is the population of the senator's state.

Senators who were sworn in during the middle of the Congress (up until the last senator who was not sworn in early after winning the November 1898 election) are listed at the end of the list with no number.

== Terms of service ==
Class	Terms of service of senators that expired in years
Class 1	Terms of service of senators that expired in 1899 (CA, CT, DE, FL, IN, MA, MD, ME, MI, MN, MO, MS, MT, ND, NE, NJ, NV, NY, OH, PA, RI, TN, TX, UT, VA, VT, WA, WI, WV, and WY.)
Class 2	Terms of service of senators that expired in 1901 (AL, AR, CO, DE, GA, IA, ID, IL, KS, KY, LA, MA, ME, MI, MN, MS, MT, NC, NE, NH, NJ, OR, RI, SC, SD, TN, TX, VA, WV, and WY.)
Class 3	Terms of service of senators that expired in 1903 (AL, AR, CA, CO, CT, FL, GA, ID, IL, IN, IA, KS, KY, LA, MD, MO, NC, ND, NH, NV, NY, OH, OR, PA, SC, SD, UT, VT, WA, and WI.)

== U.S. Senate seniority list ==
U.S. Senate seniority
Rank	Senator (party-state)	Seniority date	Other factors
1	Justin S. Morrill (R-VT)	March 4, 1867	Former representative
2	William B. Allison (R-IA)	March 4, 1873	Former representative
3	John P. Jones (R-NV)	March 4, 1873	
4	Francis Cockrell (D-MO)	March 4, 1875	
5	George F. Hoar (R-MA)	March 4, 1877	Former representative
6	Isham G. Harris (D-TN)	March 4, 1877	Former governor, former representative
7	John T. Morgan (D-AL)	March 4, 1877	
8	George G. Vest (D-MO)	March 4, 1879	Missouri 5th in population (1870)
9	Orville H. Platt (R-CT)	March 4, 1879	Connecticut 25th in population (1870)
10	John Sherman (R-OH)	March 4, 1881	Previously a senator
11	Eugene Hale (R-ME)	March 4, 1881	Former representative (10 years)
12	Joseph R. Hawley (R-CT)	March 4, 1881	Former representative (5 years)
13	James Z. George (D-MS)	March 4, 1881	Mississippi 18th in population (1870)
14	Arthur P. Gorman (D-MD)	March 4, 1881	Maryland 20th in population (1870)
15	William P. Frye (R-ME)	March 18, 1881	Former representative
16	Nelson W. Aldrich (R-RI)	October 5, 1881	Former representative, former governor
17	Shelby M. Cullom (R-IL)	March 4, 1883	Former representative, former governor
18	Henry M. Teller (D-CO)	March 4, 1885	Previously a senator
19	James K. Jones (D-AR)	March 4, 1885	
20	George Gray (D-DE)	March 18, 1885	
21	James H. Berry (D-AR)	March 20, 1885	Former governor
22	William M. Stewart (R-NV)	March 4, 1887	Previously a senator (11 years)
23	David Turpie (D-IN)	March 4, 1887	Previously a senator (1 month)
24	John W. Daniel (D-VA)	March 4, 1887	Former representative
25	William B. Bate (D-TN)	March 4, 1887	Former governor, Tennessee 12th in population (1880)
26	Cushman K. Davis (R-MN)	March 4, 1887	Former governor, Minnesota 26th in population (1880)
27	Matthew Quay (R-PA)	March 4, 1887	Pennsylvania 2nd in population (1880)
28	Charles J. Faulkner (D-WV)	March 4, 1887	West Virginia 29th in population (1880)
29	Samuel Pasco (D-FL)	May 19, 1887	
30	James McMillan (R-MI)	March 4, 1889	Michigan 9th in population (1880)
31	Edward O. Wolcott (R-CO)	March 4, 1889	Colorado 35th in population (1880)
32	William E. Chandler (R-NH)	June 18, 1889	
33	Richard F. Pettigrew (SR-SD)	November 2, 1889	Former delegate
34	George L. Shoup (R-ID)	December 18, 1890	Former governor
35	Jacob H. Gallinger (R-NH)	March 4, 1891	Former representative (4 years)
36	Henry C. Hansbrough (R-ND)	March 4, 1891	Former representative (2 years)
37	James H. Kyle (R-SD)	March 4, 1891	
38	Redfield Proctor (R-VT)	November 2, 1891	Former governor
39	Roger Q. Mills (D-TX)	March 23, 1892	
40	Donelson Caffery (D-LA)	December 31, 1892	
41	William Lindsay (D-KY)	February 15, 1893	
42	Henry Cabot Lodge (R-MA)	March 4, 1893	Former representative (6 years)
43	John L. Mitchell (D-WI)	March 4, 1893	Former representative (2 years)
44	Edward Murphy Jr. (D-NY)	March 4, 1893	New York 1st in population (1890)
45	James Smith Jr. (D-NJ)	March 4, 1893	New Jersey 18th in population (1890)
46	Stephen M. White (D-CA)	March 4, 1893	California 22nd in population (1890)
47	William V. Allen (PP-NE)	March 4, 1893	Nebraska 26th in population (1890)
48	William N. Roach (D-ND)	March 4, 1893	North Dakota 41st in population (1890)
49	George C. Perkins (R-CA)	July 26, 1893	Former governor
50	Lee Mantle (SR-MT)	January 16, 1895	
51	Julius C. Burrows (R-MI)	January 23, 1895	Former representative
52	Clarence D. Clark (R-WY)	January 24, 1895	Former representative
53	Jeter C. Pritchard (R-NC)	January 24, 1895	
54	John L. Wilson (R-WA)	February 19, 1895	
55	Edward C. Walthall (D-MS)	March 4, 1895	Previously a senator (9 years)
56	William J. Sewell (R-NJ)	March 4, 1895	Previously a senator (6 years)
57	Francis E. Warren (R-WY)	March 4, 1895	Previously a senator (3 years)
58	Horace Chilton (D-TX)	March 4, 1895	Previously a senator (2 years)
59	Thomas H. Carter (R-MT)	March 4, 1895	Former delegate, former representative
60	Stephen B. Elkins (R-WV)	March 4, 1895	Former delegate, former cabinet member
61	John H. Gear (R-IA)	March 4, 1895	Former governor, Iowa 10th in population (1890)
62	Knute Nelson (R-MN)	March 4, 1895	Former governor, Minnesota 20th in population (1890)
63	Benjamin Tillman (D-SC)	March 4, 1895	Former governor, South Carolina 23rd in population (1890)
64	George P. Wetmore (R-RI)	March 4, 1895	Former governor, Rhode Island 36th in population (1890)
65	Augustus O. Bacon (D-GA)	March 4, 1895	Georgia 12th in population (1890)
66	Thomas S. Martin (D-VA)	March 4, 1895	Virginia 15th in population (1890)
67	Marion Butler (PP-NC)	March 4, 1895	North Carolina 16th in population (1890)
68	Lucien Baker (PP-KS)	March 4, 1895	Kansas 19th in population (1890)
69	John M. Thurston (R-NE)	March 4, 1895	Nebraska 26th in population (1890)
70	George W. McBride (R-OR)	March 4, 1895	Oregon 38th in population (1890)
71	Frank J. Cannon (SR-UT)	January 22, 1896	
72	Richard R. Kenney (D-DE)	January 19, 1897	
73	John C. Spooner (R-WI)	March 4, 1897	Previously a senator (6 years)
74	Thomas C. Platt (R-NY)	March 4, 1897	Previously a senator (2 months)
75	William E. Mason (R-IL)	March 4, 1897	Former representative (4 years)
76	William A. Harris (PP-KS)	March 4, 1897	Former representative (2 years), Kansas 19th in population (1890)
77	George L. Wellington (R-MD)	March 4, 1897	Former representative (2 years), Maryland 27th in population (1890)
78	Joseph L. Rawlins (D-UT)	March 4, 1897	Former delegate
79	Joseph B. Foraker (R-OH)	March 4, 1897	Former governor, Ohio 4th in population (1890)
80	Samuel D. McEnery (D-LA)	March 4, 1897	Former governor, Louisiana 25th in population (1890)
81	Boies Penrose (R-PA)	March 4, 1897	Pennsylvania 2nd in population (1890)
82	Charles W. Fairbanks (R-IN)	March 4, 1897	Indiana 8th in population (1890)
83	William J. Deboe (R-KY)	March 4, 1897	Kentucky 11th in population (1890)
84	Alexander S. Clay (D-GA)	March 4, 1897	Georgia 12th in population (1890)
85	Edmund Pettus (D-AL)	March 4, 1897	Alabama 17th in population (1890)
86	Joseph H. Earle (D-SC)	March 4, 1897	South Carolina 23rd in population (1890)
87	George Turner (SR-WA)	March 4, 1897	Washington 34th in population (1890)
88	Henry Heitfeld (PP-ID)	March 4, 1897	Idaho 43rd in population (1890)
	Mark Hanna (R-OH)	March 6, 1897	
89	Stephen Mallory II (D-FL)	May 15, 1897	
	John L. McLaurin (D-SC)	June 1, 1897	
	Thomas B. Turley (D-TN)	July 20, 1897	
	Hernando Money (D-MS)	October 8, 1897	
	William V. Sullivan (D-MS)	May 31, 1898	
90	Joseph Simon (R-OR)	October 8, 1898	
	Jonathan Ross (R-VT)	January 11, 1899	

== See also ==
- 55th United States Congress
- List of United States representatives in the 55th Congress
