= Francis H. Dodds =

American politician

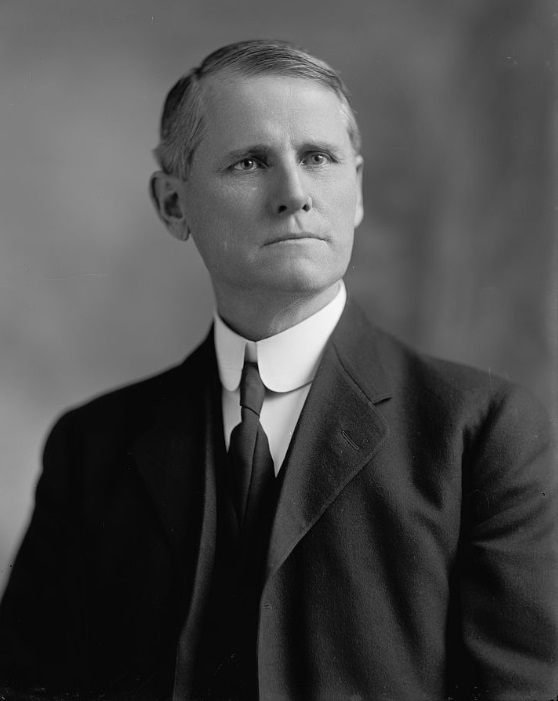

Member of the U.S. House of Representatives from Michigan's 11th district
- In office March 4, 1909 – March 3, 1913
- Preceded by: Archibald B. Darragh
- Succeeded by: Francis O. Lindquist

Personal details
- Born: June 9, 1858 St. Lawrence County, New York, U.S.
- Died: December 23, 1940 (aged 82) Mount Pleasant, Michigan, U.S.
- Party: Republican
- Education: University of Michigan

Francis Henry Dodds (June 9, 1858 – December 23, 1940), was a politician from the U.S. state of Michigan.

Dodds was born on a farm near Waddington in St. Lawrence County, New York. He attended the local schools and moved with his parents to Isabella County, Michigan, in 1866. He graduated from Olivet College and taught school at Olivet and Mount Pleasant, Michigan. He graduated from the law department of the University of Michigan at Ann Arbor in 1880 and was admitted to the bar the same year and commenced the practice of law at Mount Pleasant. He served as city attorney of Mount Pleasant, 1892–1894; and was a member of the board of education, 1894-1897.

Dodds was elected as a Republican from Michigan's 11th congressional district to the 61st and 62nd Congresses, serving from March 4, 1909 to March 3, 1913. He was an unsuccessful candidate for renomination in 1912.

After leaving Congress, Dodds returned to Mount Pleasant and resumed the practice of law in until his death. He died aged 82 and is interred at Riverside Cemetery of Mount Pleasant.

U.S. House of Representatives
Preceded by Archibald B. Darragh	United States Representative for the 11th congressional district of Michigan; March 4, 1909 – March 3, 1913	Succeeded by Francis O. Lindquist
