= John Avery (politician) =

American politician (1824–1914)

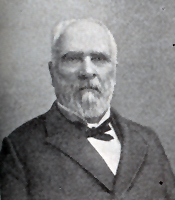
- From 1896's An Illustrated Congressional Manual.

Member of the U.S. House of Representatives from Michigan's 11th district
- In office March 4, 1893 – March 3, 1897
- Preceded by: Samuel M. Stephenson
- Succeeded by: William S. Mesick

Member of the Michigan Board of Health
- In office 1880–1893

Member of the Michigan House of Representatives
- In office 1869–1870

Personal details
- Born: February 29, 1824 Watertown, New York, US
- Died: January 21, 1914 (aged 89) Greenville, Michigan, US
- Resting place: Forest Home Cemetery; Greenville, Michigan
- Education: Cleveland Medical College
- Profession: Physician

Military service
- Allegiance: United States (Union)
- Branch/service: Union Army
- Years of service: 1862-1865
- Rank: Major (Surgeon)
- Unit: 21st Michigan Volunteer Infantry Regiment
- Battles/wars: March to the Sea; Carolinas campaign

John Avery (February 29, 1824 – January 21, 1914) was a physician and politician from the U.S. state of Michigan. He served two terms in the United States House of Representatives from 1893 to 1897.

== Early life and education ==
Avery was born in Watertown, New York, and moved with his parents to Michigan in 1836. He attended the common schools and entered Grass Lake Academy in Jackson, where he studied medicine for two years. He graduated from the Cleveland Medical College in 1850 and commenced the practice of medicine in Ionia, Michigan. He then moved to Otsego, Michigan, in 1852 and continued the practice of his profession.

== Civil War service ==
During the American Civil War, he was assistant surgeon and surgeon of the Twenty-first Regiment, Michigan Volunteer Infantry. He served in the Army of the Cumberland in Kentucky and Tennessee and was with General William Tecumseh Sherman on his March to the Sea, as well as during the subsequent Carolinas campaign.

== Political career ==
He settled in Greenville, Michigan, in 1868 and again engaged in the practice of medicine. He was a member of the Michigan State House of Representatives in 1869 and 1870. He was appointed a member of the State Board of Health in 1880 and was reappointed in 1886.

Avery was elected as a Republican to the United States House of Representatives for the Fifty-third and Fifty-fourth Congresses, serving from March 4, 1893, to March 3, 1897. He was not a candidate for renomination in 1896.

After leaving Congress, Avery went back to Greenville and returned to the practice of medicine. He died at the age of eighty-nine and was interred at Forest Home Cemetery of Greenville.

U.S. House of Representatives
| Preceded by Samuel M. Stephenson | United States Representative for the 11th congressional district of Michigan; 1893 – 1897 | Succeeded by William S. Mesick |
