= Archibald B. Darragh =

American politician (1840–1927)

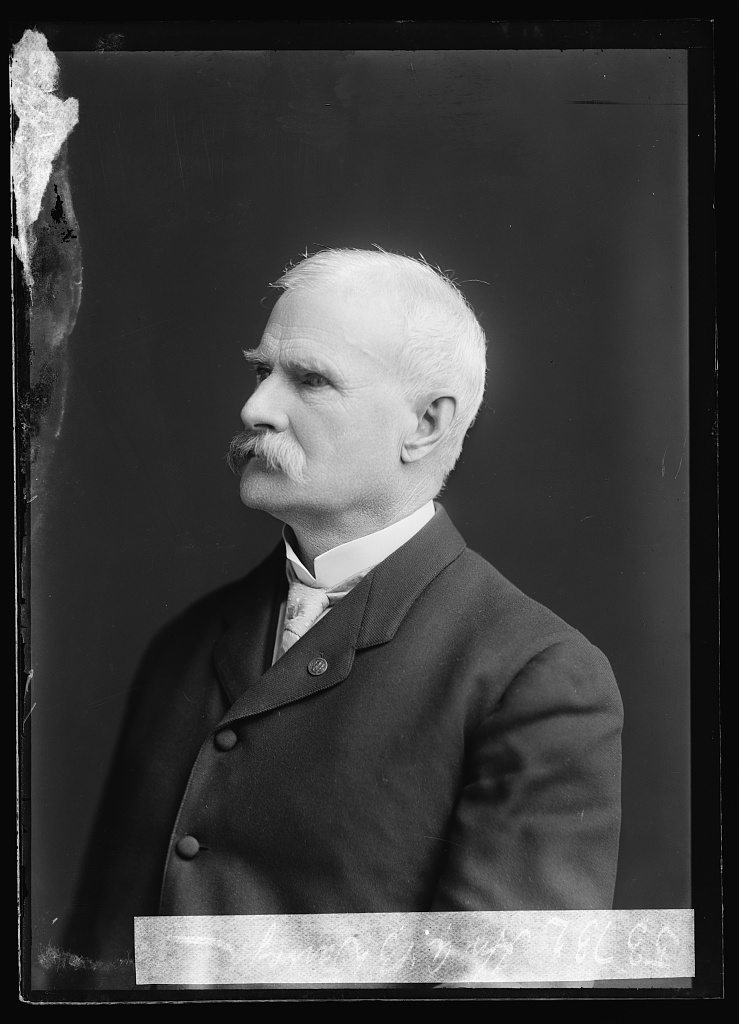
- Archibald B. Darragh photographed by C. M. Bell Studio

Member of the U.S. House of Representatives from Michigan's 11th district
- In office March 4, 1901 – March 3, 1909
- Preceded by: William S. Mesick
- Succeeded by: Francis H. Dodds

Personal details
- Born: December 23, 1840 La Salle Township, Michigan, U.S.
- Died: February 21, 1927 (aged 86) St. Louis, Michigan, U.S.
- Party: Republican
- Education: University of Michigan

Archibald Bard Darragh (December 23, 1840 – February 21, 1927) was a politician from the U.S. state of Michigan.

== Life and politics ==
Bard was born in La Salle Township, Michigan, and attended the common schools and a private academy in Monroe. He entered the University of Michigan at Ann Arbor in 1857 and pursued a classical course for two years. He moved to Claiborne County, Mississippi, and became a teacher. He returned to Michigan upon the outbreak of the Civil War and enlisted in Company H, Eighteenth Regiment, Michigan Volunteer Infantry, in 1862. He was commissioned second lieutenant, Company D, Ninth Regiment, Michigan Volunteer Cavalry, in 1863; promoted to first lieutenant in 1864 and captain in 1865. After the war, he returned to Michigan and became superintendent of the public schools of Jackson in 1867. He reentered the University of Michigan and graduated in 1868. He moved to St. Louis, Michigan, in 1870 and engaged in banking. He was elected treasurer of Gratiot County, Michigan, in 1872; was a member of the Michigan House of Representatives, 1882–1883. He was mayor of St. Louis in 1893 and a member of the board of control of the State asylum.

Darragh was elected as a Republican from Michigan's 11th congressional district to the 57th and to the three succeeding Congresses, serving from March 4, 1901, to March 3, 1909. He was not a candidate for renomination in 1908 and again engaged in banking.

Darragh died at the age of eighty-six in St. Louis, Michigan, and is interred there at Oak Grove Cemetery.

U.S. House of Representatives
Preceded by William S. Mesick	United States Representative for the 11th congressional district of Michigan; March 4, 1901 – March 3, 1909	Succeeded by Francis H. Dodds
