= 21st Michigan Infantry Regiment =

- Active: September 9, 1862, to June 8, 1865
- Country: United States
- Allegiance: Union
- Branch: Infantry
- Engagements: Battle of Perryville; Battle of Stones River; Battle of Chickamauga; Battle of Chattanooga; March to the Sea; Siege of Savannah; Battle of Bentonville; Battle of Averasborough

The 21st Michigan Infantry Regiment was an infantry regiment that served in the Union Army during the American Civil War.

== Service ==
The 21st Michigan Infantry was mustered into Federal service at Ionia, Michigan, and Grand Rapids, Michigan, on September 9, 1862. The regiment recruited its members starting on July 15, 1862, from the 4th Congressional District which included the Michigan counties of Barry, Ionia, Montcalm, Kent, Ottawa, Muskegon, Oceana, Newaygo, Mecosta, Mason, Manistee, Grand Traverse, Leelanau, Manitou, Osceola, Emmet, Mackinac, Delta, and Cheboygan. The 21st Michigan Infantry rendezvous was at Ionia.

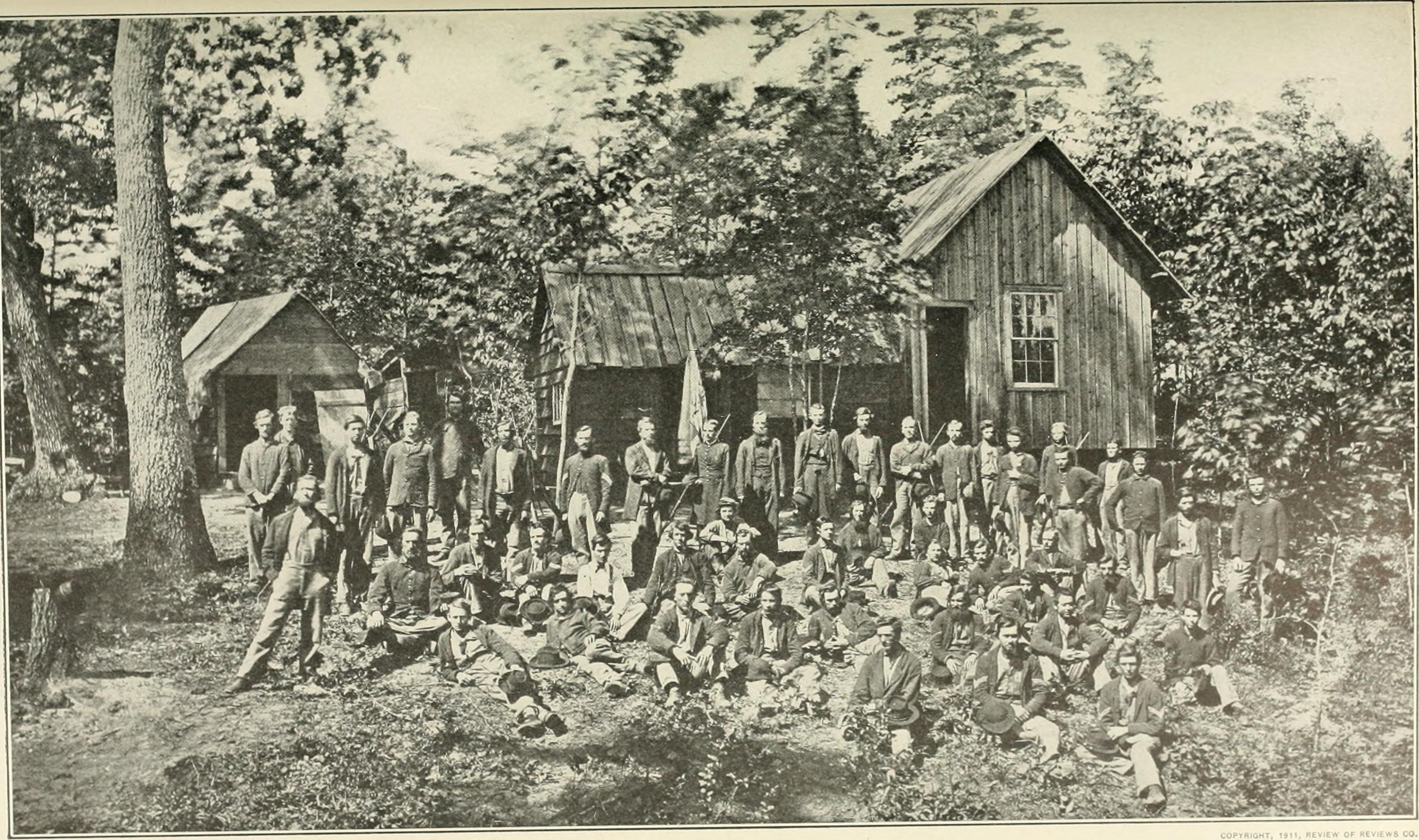
The 21st Michigan Infantry, a company of William Tecumseh Sherman's veterans.

Among the ranks were future prominent Michigan politicians John Avery and Charles E. Belknap.

The regiment left its quarters at Ionia, Michigan, on September 12 in command of Colonel Stevens, 1,008 strong, under orders to report at Cincinnati. It was immediately pushed forward into Kentucky via Louisville, and became early engaged in the realities of war.

A silk flag was provided by the ladies of Ionia and delivered to the 21st Michigan Volunteer Infantry Regiment on 6 September 1862, at that city. The center of the flag was decorated with the American eagle, holding its quiver of arrows, olive branch, etc. Over this a small National flag, and beneath it the words "Union," "Constitution." A speech was made by L. B. Soule, Esq., on behalf of the ladies, to which Colonel A. A. Stevens, commanding the regiment, appropriately replied. Afterwards speeches were made by Z. Chandler, T. W. Ferry, and F. W. Kellogg. At the same time there was presented a flag by the children of the Grand Haven Sunday-schools to Company G of the regiment. The flag given to the regiment was carried through all of its engagements, brought back to the State, and at a celebration on July 4, 1865, was formally returned, on behalf of the regiment, to the ladies by the Hon. John Avery, of Greenville, the highest-ranking officer of the regiment present, and was received on behalf of the ladies by the Hon. John B. Hutchins, of Ionia. On October 1, the 21st Michigan broke camp at Louisville and entered upon a long march through Kentucky. On the 8th it bore an important part in the Battle of Perryville in Kentucky. In this battle, the 21st Michigan suffered a loss of 24 wounded (1 mortally) and 3 missing, Colonel Stevens being among the wounded.

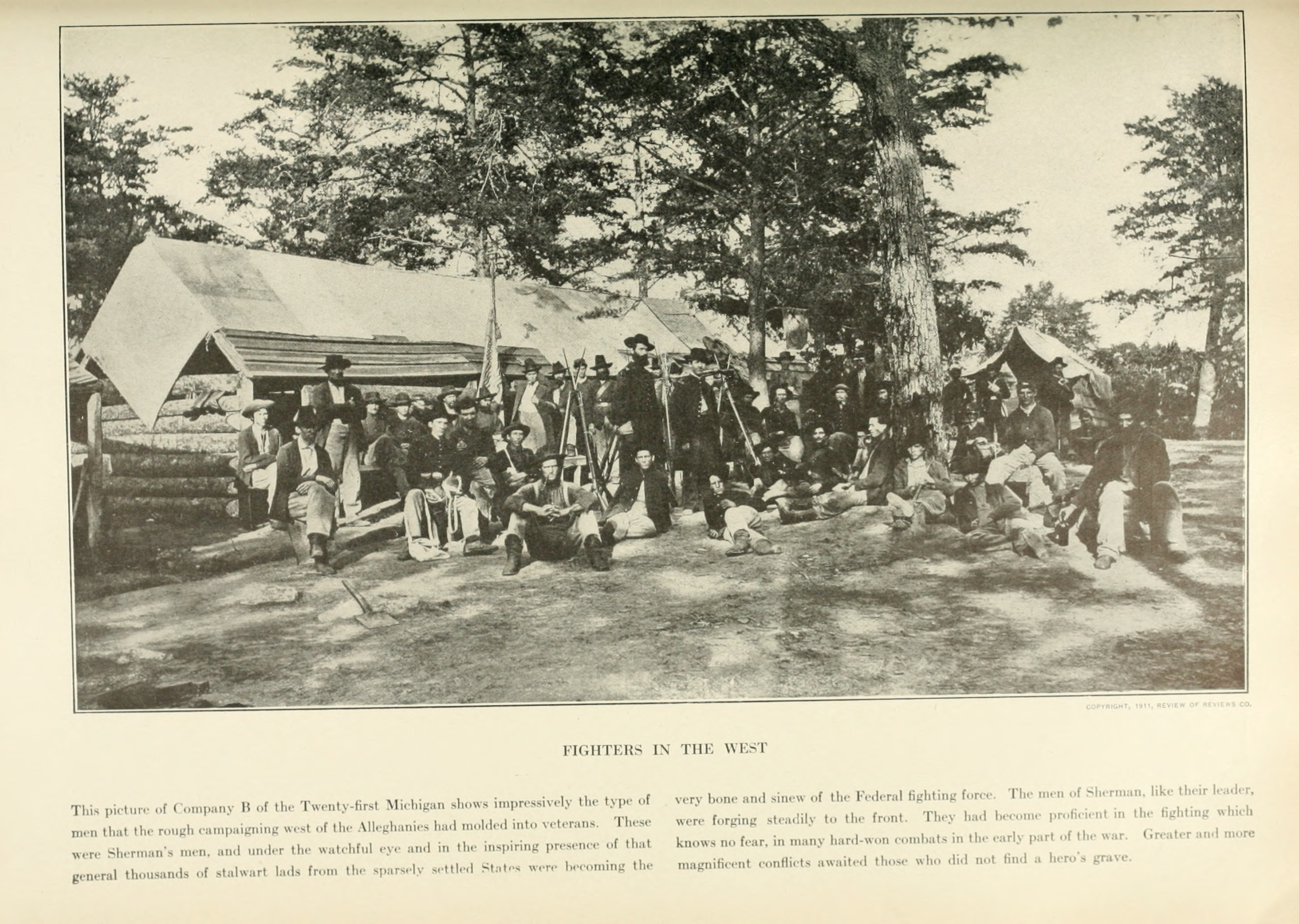
21st Michigan in the West

From Perryville the regiment moved to Bowling Green, Kentucky, and on November 4, 1862, proceeded to Nashville, arriving there on the 12th and encamped, remaining there until the general advance of General Rosecrans on Murfreesboro. The 21st Michigan left Nashville on 26 December 1862, with the army, in command of Lieutenant Colonel McCreery, and was engaged at Lavergne on the 27th, and at Stewart's creek on the 29th. It participated with Sill's brigade of Sheridan's division in the five days' Battle of Stone's River, sustaining a loss of 17 killed, 85 wounded, including Captain Leonard O. Fitzgerald, mortally, and 37 missing.

After Colonel Stevens resigned due to ill health, the regiment was commanded by Colonel McCreery. The unit remained at Murfreesboro, employed on picket duty and as guard for forage trains, until June 24, 1863, when it advanced with the army on Tullahoma. During July 1863 the regiment was stationed at Cowan and Anderson Station, on the Nashville and Chattanooga railroad. Subsequently, it occupied Bridgeport, under General Lytle, who commanded the brigade to which the 21st was attached. September 2, 1863, the regiment crossed the Tennessee, and advanced with the corps of Major General McCook to Trenton, Ga., from whence it crossed the mountains to Alpine, 30 miles from Rome; thence made a forced march toward Chattanooga, between the mountain ranges, and came into line of battle at Chickamauga September 19, 1863. The following day the regiment participated in the battle of Chickamauga, sustaining a loss of 11 killed, 58 wounded, 35 missing, 3 prisoners. Of the missing, 21 were known to be wounded. Lieutenant Colonel M. B. Wells was among the killed, and Captain Edgar W. Smith, being mortally wounded, died October 13 following, while Colonel McCreery, commanding the regiment, was severely wounded and taken prisoner. In this engagement the regiment belonged to the same brigade as at Stone River, and then commanded by General Lytle, was serving in Sheridan's division of the 4th corps. On September 20, while the division was advancing to the support of General Thomas, it became heavily engaged, and captured prisoners from four different rebel divisions. The 21st was in the hottest of the fight, behaved with great courage, never yielding except when overcome by immense odds, but after a brave but fruitless effort against a perfect torrent of the enemy was compelled to give way.

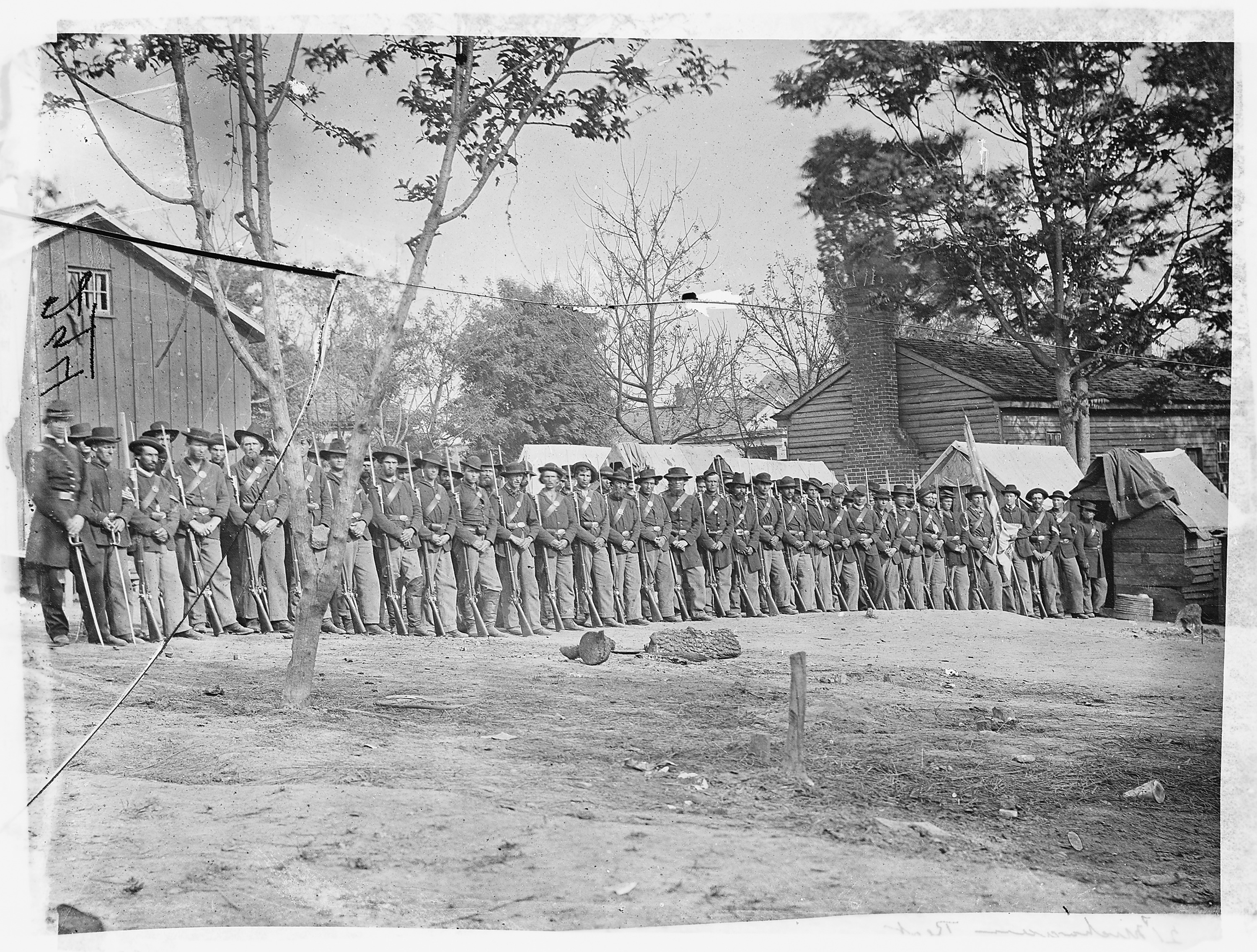

After the battle of Chickamauga the regiment, in command of Lieutenant Colonel S. K. Bishop, was detached from its brigade by order of General Thomas, and was placed under General Smith, Chief Engineer of the Department, and performed duty as engineer troops, forming part of Engineer Brigade, and was on that duty during the engagement of Mission Ridge. It was stationed, until June 11, 1864, on the north side of the Tennessee River, near Chattanooga, and was employed in building a bridge over the river, and in the erection of storehouses in Chattanooga. At the above date the regiment was ordered to Lookout Mountain, where it was engaged in building hospitals, running mills, and in the performance of the usual picket duty, until 20 September following, when it was relieved from further duty with the Engineer Corps. On September 27 the regiment left Lookout Mountain for Tullahoma, thence it proceeded to Nashville. Joining the forces under General Rosseau, it participated with them in the pursuit of the rebels under General Forrest, beyond Florence, Ala., returning to Florence on 11 October. On the 14th, the regiment was ordered to Chattanooga, and on the 18th to proceed to and garrison Dalton, Ga. On 30 October, the regiment was relieved at Dalton, and was ordered to join its corps. During the year it had traveled between 480 and 500 miles.

On November 1, 1864, the 21st, then in command of Colonel Bishop, was at Dalton, Ga., where it received orders to march to Kingston and join the 14th army corps, and on arriving there was assigned to the 2d brigade, 1st division, when it started for Atlanta, and on the march assisted in tearing up the railroad track and destroying everything in its rear, reaching that point on the 15th, and on the following day after the destruction of that place, moved with General Sherman's army towards Milledgeville, arriving there on the 22d, and then took up a line of march in the direction of Augusta, and on reaching within about forty miles of that point, turned directly south towards Savannah, and arrived at the works in front of that place on 10 December, and there relieved a part of the 20th army corps, which held a portion of the works on the south side of the canal, being the most exposed position on the whole line. There the men being obliged to stay in the trenches, without tents and lightly clad, few of them having blankets, suffered extremely from cold, and also from hunger, as their rations were short. The regiment continued in that position until the 15th, when it moved back north of the canal, and remained there until the evacuation of Savannah on the 21st, and then encamped about three-fourths of a mile from the city.

During the 25 days occupied on the march from Atlanta, only two and a half days' rations had been issued to the regiment, it being mainly supplied with subsistence procured by foraging on the inhabitants of the country through which it passed. The regiment remained at Savannah, refitting, reclothing the men, and getting ready for the campaign through the Carolinas, until January 20, 1865 following, when in command of Captain A. C. Prince, it marched up along the Savannah river to Sister's Ferry, where it lay until 5 February, then crossed into South Carolina, still continuing the movement in the vicinity of the river until nearly opposite Columbia, when a direction was taken towards that point, and on arriving there turned to the left, crossed the Black and Saluda rivers, and struck the railroad at Winnsboro, where it assisted in destroying the track as far north as Blackstock Station; then changing the direction eastward, crossed the Great and Little Pedee rivers about eight miles north of Cheraw, then crossed the Wateree at Rocky Mountain, on pontoons made from wagon boxes covered with tent flies and canvas, the high water having carried away the pontoon bridge. While crossing, the brigade, being the rear guard, was much annoyed by the enemy's cavalry, but succeeded in getting over the entire corps' train, when the march was resumed in the direction of Fayetteville, N. C. Reaching there, Cape Fear river was crossed on 13 March, and moving forward, met the enemy at Averysboro on the 16th, and after a severe engagement he retreated during the night; continuing the march, again encountering the enemy at Bentonville, on the 19th, where the regiment became heavily engaged, losing six officers and eighty-six men, killed and wounded, out of 230, and after the retreat of the enemy from that point the march was resumed, and crossing the Neuse river, arrived at Goldsboro on the 25th, after a march of sixty-four days from Savannah, during which time only twelve days' rations had been issued to the regiment, the main supply having been obtained by foraging on the country on the line of march.

The regiment remained in camp near Goldsboro until April 11, when again in command of Colonel Bishop, a movement was commenced in the direction of Raleigh. Reaching there on the 14th, it then marched to Haywood, on Cape Fear river, where it remained until the surrender of Johnston's army, when the regiment, with its division and corps, started for Richmond, in company with the 20th corps. The two corps being destined for the same point, entered on a friendly race, which resulted in the 1st division, 14th corps, in which was the 21st Michigan, reaching that point ahead of any other troops, marching 280 miles in less than eight days. From Richmond the march was continued to Washington, D. C., where the regiment participated in the review of General Sherman's army on 24 May, and on 8 January was mustered out of service, when it proceeded to Michigan, arriving at Detroit on the 13th, and on the 22d was paid off and disbanded.

The 21st participated in encounters with the enemy at Perryville, Ky., October 8, 1862; Lavergne, Tenn., December 27, 1862; Stewart's Creek, Tenn., December 29, 1862; Stone River, Tenn., December 29, 31, 1862, and January 1, 2, and 3, 1863; Tullahoma, Tenn., June 24, 1863; Elk River, Tenn., July 1, 1863; Chickamauga, Ga., September 19, 20, and 21, 1863; Chattanooga, Tenn., October 6, 1863; Brown's Ferry, Tenn., October 27, 1863; Mission Ridge, Tenn., November 26, 1863; Savannah, Ga., December 11, 18, 20, and 21, 1864; Averysboro, N. C., March 16, 1865; Bentonville, N. C., March 19, 11, 1865.

The reports of the regiment show a membership of 1,477 officers and men.

The regiment was mustered out of service on June 8, 1865.

== Total strength and casualties ==
The regiment suffered 3 officers and 80 enlisted men who were killed in action or mortally wounded and 3 officers and 291 enlisted men who died of disease, for a total of 377 fatalities.

== Commanders ==
- Brig. General Ambrose A. Stevens
- Colonel William B. McCreery
- Brev. Colonel Loomis K. Bishop
- Brev. Major Arthur C. Prince

== See also ==
- List of Michigan Civil War Units
- Michigan in the American Civil War
