= James B. Morgan =

American politician

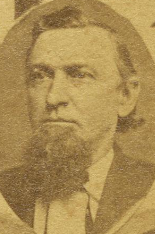

Member of the U.S. House of Representatives from Mississippi's 2nd district
- In office March 4, 1885 – March 3, 1891
- Preceded by: James R. Chalmers
- Succeeded by: John C. Kyle

Member of the Mississippi Senate
- In office 1877-1879

Personal details
- Born: James Bright Morgan; March 14, 1833 Fayetteville, Tennessee, U.S.
- Died: June 18, 1892 (aged 59) Horn Lake, Mississippi, U.S.
- Cause of death: Shot
- Resting place: Hernando Baptist Cemetery
- Party: Democratic

James Bright Morgan (March 14, 1833 – June 18, 1892) was an American lawyer, politician, and Confederate Civil War veteran who served three terms as a U.S. Representative from Mississippi 1885 to 1891.

After leaving Congress, he returned to his legal practice but was murdered by an opposing counsel in 1892.

== Early life and career ==
He was born near Fayetteville, Tennessee and moved with his parents to De Soto County, Mississippi in 1840, settling in Hernando. He received an academic education and studied law. Morgan was admitted to the bar in 1857, and practiced in Hernando.

In 1857 he was elected probate judge of De Soto County and he served until 1861, the outbreak of the Civil War.

=== Civil War ===
During the Civil War, Morgan enlisted in the Confederate States Army, initially as a private. He eventually received a commission and progressed through the ranks, becoming the commanding officer of the 29th Mississippi Infantry Regiment. He was severely wounded in the Battle of Chickamauga in September 1863, and rose to the rank of colonel before the end of the war.

After he war, he returned to his law practice and was once again elected probate judge of De Soto County.

== Political career ==
Morgan was elected to the Mississippi State Senate in 1876, and served until 1878 when he became Chancellor of the third chancery district, a post he held until 1882.

=== Congress ===
He was then elected as a Democrat to the Forty-ninth, Fiftieth, and Fifty-first Congresses (March 4, 1885 – March 3, 1891).

== Retirement and death ==
After retiring from his political career he resumed the practice of law. He died near Horn Lake, Mississippi on June 18, 1892, and was interred at Hernando Baptist Cemetery.

=== Murder and aftermath ===
Morgan died when he was shot while on board a train traveling to Memphis, Tennessee; his assailant was attorney Henry Foster. Morgan and Foster had been opposing counsel in a lawsuit shortly before Morgan's death, which led to an argument between Foster and Morgan's son; Morgan responded by administering a caning to Foster. Foster retaliated by shooting Morgan.

Foster was convicted at his first trial. After a successful appeal resulted in a retrial, he was acquitted in 1894.

== Sources ==
=== Newspapers ===
- "Mississippi Delegate Shot: Judge John Bright Morgan Murdered on a Train". Salt Lake Tribune. Salt lake City, UT. June 19, 1892. p. 1 – via Newspapers.com.
- "Morgan's Slayer Acquitted". The Daily Commercial Herald. Vicksburg, MS. June 23, 1894. p. 2 – via Newspapers.com.

U.S. House of Representatives
Preceded by James R. Chalmers	Member of the U.S. House of Representatives from Mississippi's 2nd congressional district 1885-1891	Succeeded by John C. Kyle
