= Francis O. Lindquist =

American politician

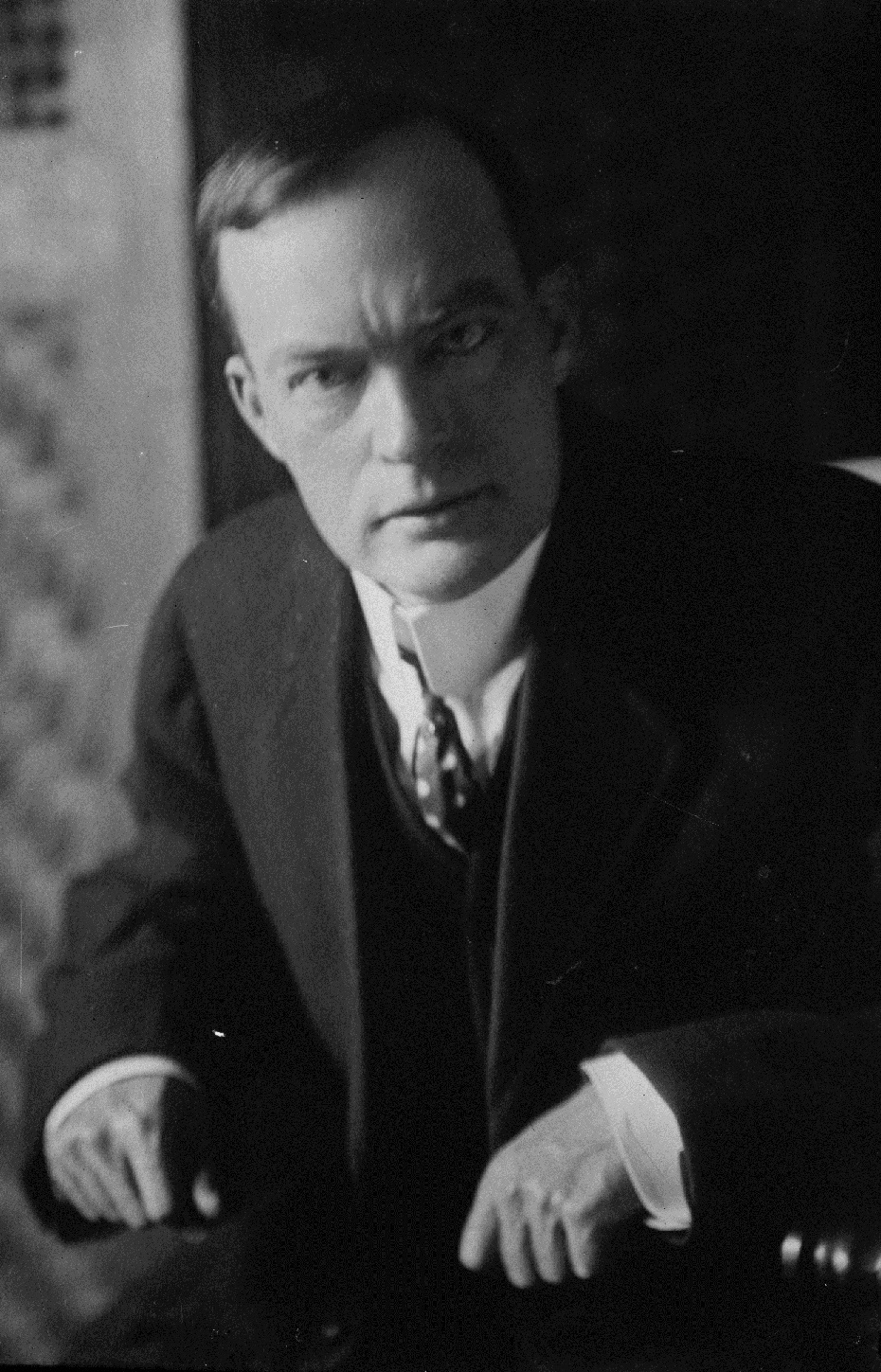

Member of the U.S. House of Representatives from Michigan's 11th district
- In office March 4, 1913 – March 3, 1915
- Preceded by: Francis H. Dodds
- Succeeded by: Frank D. Scott

Personal details
- Born: September 27, 1869 Marinette, Wisconsin, U.S.
- Died: September 25, 1924 (aged 54) Grand Rapids, Michigan, U.S.
- Party: Republican

Francis Oscar Lindquist (September 27, 1869 – September 25, 1924) was a politician from the U.S. state of Michigan.

Lindquist was born in Marinette, Wisconsin on September 27, 1869 to a Norwegian-born mother and a Swedish-born father and attended the common schools. He moved to Greenville, Michigan, in 1904 and engaged in the mail-order clothing and manufacturing business. He moved to Grand Rapids in 1915 and became president of the Canada Mills Co., of New York and Michigan.

Lindquist was elected as a Republican from Michigan's 11th congressional district to the 63rd United States Congress, serving from March 4, 1913 to March 3, 1915. He won the election in a landslide, using mail-order tactics to canvass voters. He was not a candidate for renomination in 1914 and resumed the mail-order business in Grand Rapids. After the First World War, he returned to Greenville and supervised a correspondence-school course for sales people. In 1922, he lost to Bird J. Vincent in the Republican primary election for U.S. Representative in Michigan's 8th congressional district.

Lindquist died at age 54, on September 25, 1924, in Grand Rapids and is interred at Forest Home Cemetery in Greenville.

U.S. House of Representatives
Preceded by Francis H. Dodds	United States Representative for the 11th congressional district of Michigan; 1913–1915	Succeeded by Frank D. Scott
