= William S. Mesick =

American politician

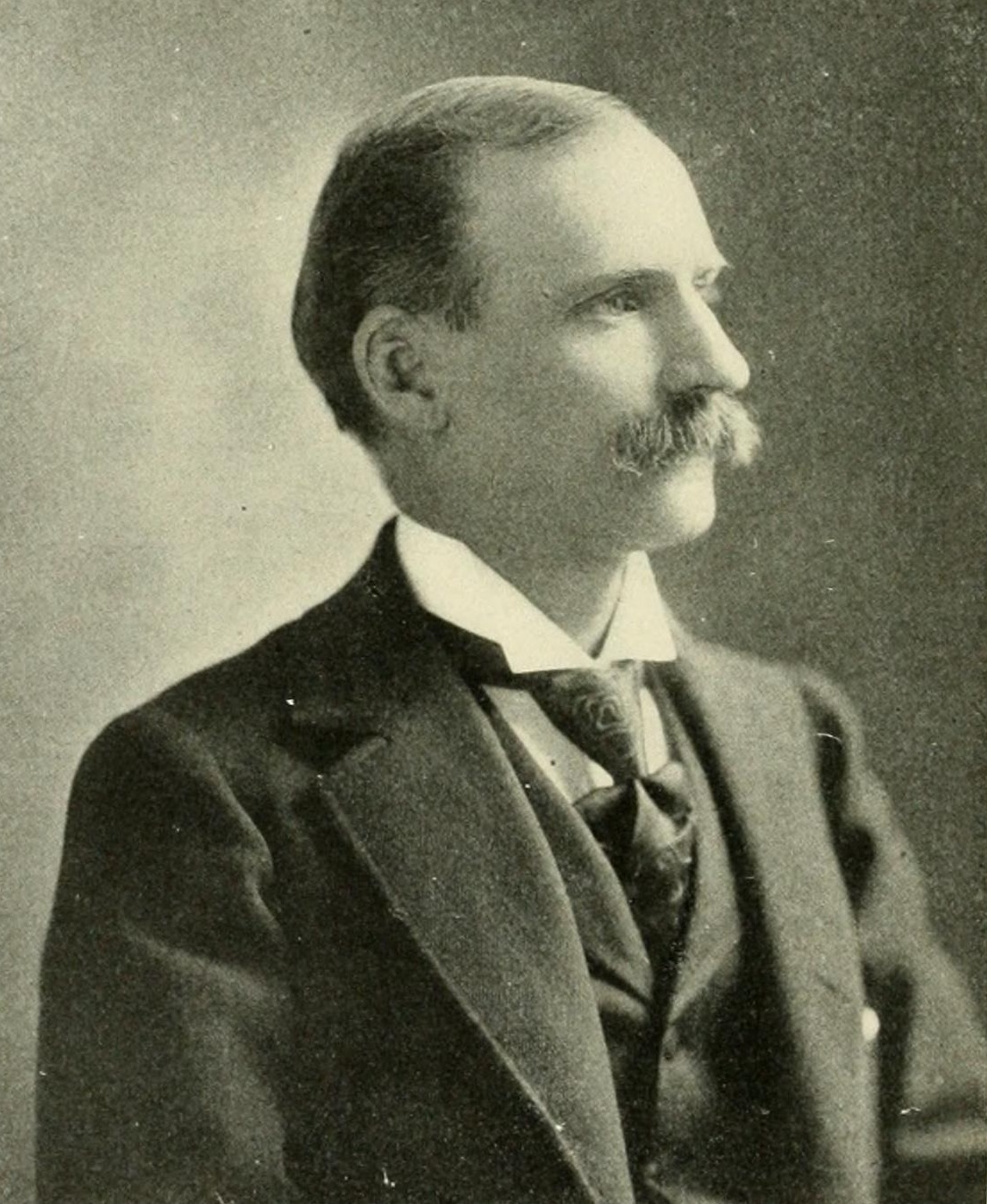

Member of the U.S. House of Representatives from Michigan's 11th district
- In office March 4, 1897 – March 3, 1901
- Preceded by: John Avery
- Succeeded by: Archibald B. Darragh

Personal details
- Born: August 26, 1856 Newark, New York, U.S.
- Died: December 1, 1942 (aged 86) Petoskey, Michigan, U.S.
- Party: Republican
- Education: University of Michigan

William Smith Mesick (August 26, 1856 – December 1, 1942) was a politician from the U.S. state of Michigan.

Mesick was born in Newark, New York and attended the common schools. He moved to Michigan and attended Kalamazoo Business College and graduated from the law department of the University of Michigan at Ann Arbor in 1881. He was admitted to the bar in 1881 and commenced the practice of his profession in Mancelona. He was prosecuting attorney of Antrim County for one term.

In 1896, Mesick was elected as a Republican from Michigan's 11th congressional district to the 55th Congress and re-elected in 1898 to the 56th, serving from March 4, 1897 to March 3, 1901. During the 56th Congress, he was chairman of the Committee on Elections No. 3. He was an unsuccessful candidate for re-nomination in 1900, losing in the Republican primaries to Archibald B. Darragh.

After leaving Congress, Mesick resumed the practice of his profession in Mancelona and subsequently moved to Petoskey, Michigan and continued practice. He died in Petoskey and is interred there at Greenwood Cemetery.

U.S. House of Representatives
Preceded by John Avery	United States Representative for the 11th congressional district of Michigan; 1897 – 1901	Succeeded by Archibald B. Darragh
