= Thomas Spight =

American politician

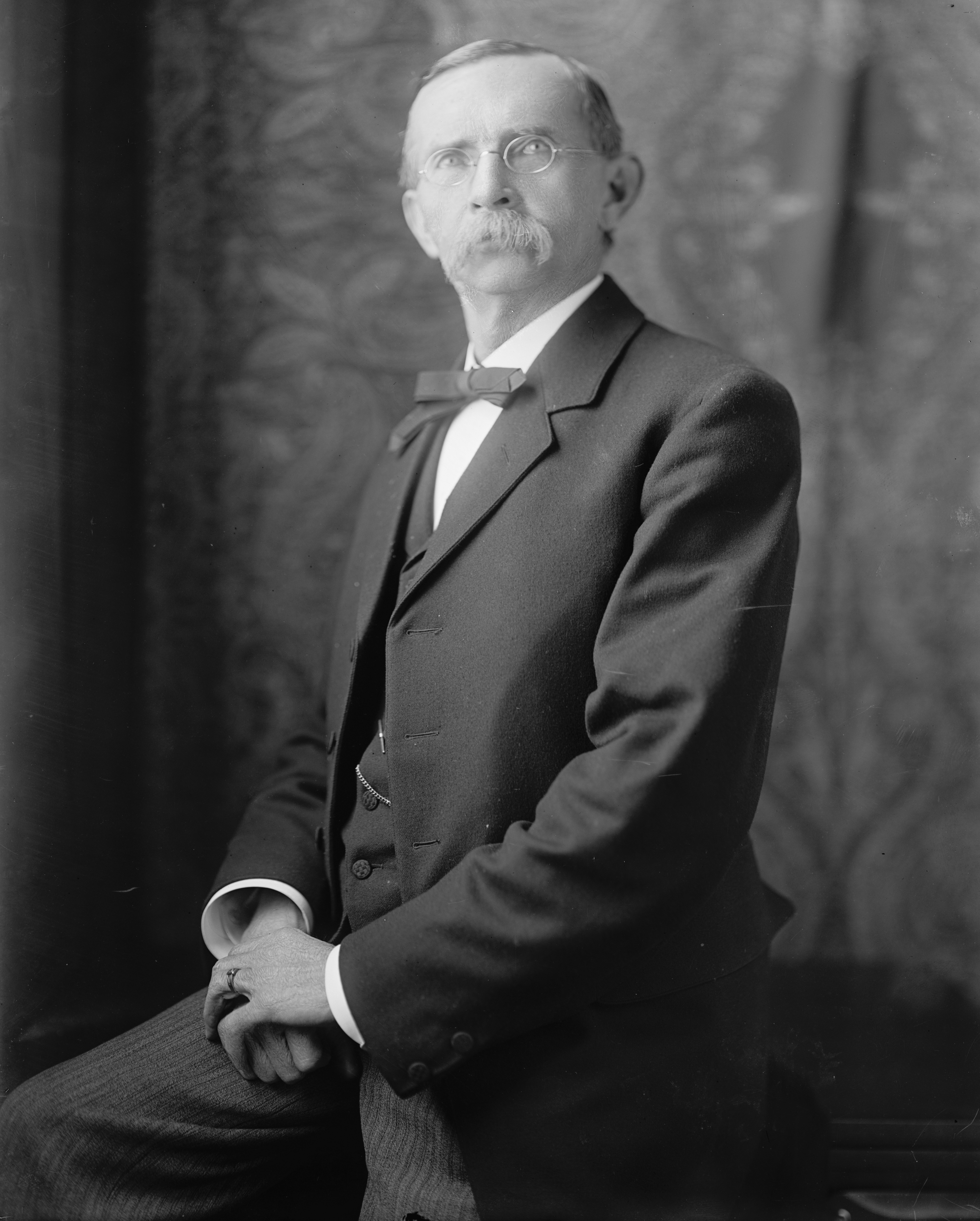

Member of the U.S. House of Representatives from Mississippi's 2nd district
- In office July 5, 1898 – March 3, 1911
- Preceded by: William V. Sullivan
- Succeeded by: Hubert D. Stephens

Member of the Mississippi House of Representatives
- In office 1874–1880

Personal details
- Born: October 25, 1841 near Ripley, Mississippi
- Died: January 5, 1924 (aged 82)
- Resting place: Ripley Cemetery
- Party: Democratic
- Occupation: Lawyer, schoolteacher, newspaper owner

Military service
- Allegiance: Confederate States of America
- Branch/service: Army

Thomas Spight (October 25, 1841 – January 5, 1924) was an American lawyer and Confederate Civil War veteran who served seven terms as a U.S. representative from Mississippi from 1898 to 1911.

== Early life and education ==
Born near Ripley, Mississippi, Spight attended the common schools, Ripley Academy, Purdy (Tennessee) College, and the La Grange (Tennessee) Synodical College where he was a member of the Sigma (original) chapter of the Sigma Chi Fraternity.

== Civil War ==
He enlisted in the Confederate States Army as a private in 1861. He was promoted to the rank of lieutenant the same year. In 1862, he became captain of Company B, Thirty-fourth Regiment, Mississippi Volunteer Infantry, and served until the close of the war.

== Career ==
He taught school and also engaged in agricultural pursuits. He studied law. He was admitted to the bar in 1875 and commenced practice in Ripley, Mississippi.

He served as member of the Mississippi House of Representatives from 1874–1880. He established the Southern Sentinel in 1879, retiring from the newspaper business five years later. He served as prosecuting attorney of the third judicial district 1884–1892.

=== Congress ===
Spight was elected as a Democrat to the Fifty-fifth Congress to fill the vacancy caused by the resignation of William V. Sullivan. He was reelected to the Fifty-sixth and to the five succeeding Congresses and served from July 5, 1898, to March 3, 1911. He was an unsuccessful candidate for renomination in 1910.

== Later career and death ==
He again resumed the practice of his profession and also engaged in religious work until his death in Ripley, Mississippi, January 5, 1924.

He was interred in Ripley Cemetery.

U.S. House of Representatives
Preceded by William V. Sullivan	Member of the U.S. House of Representatives from Mississippi's 2nd congressional district 1898–1911	Succeeded by Hubert D. Stephens
