= William V. Sullivan =

American politician (1857–1918)

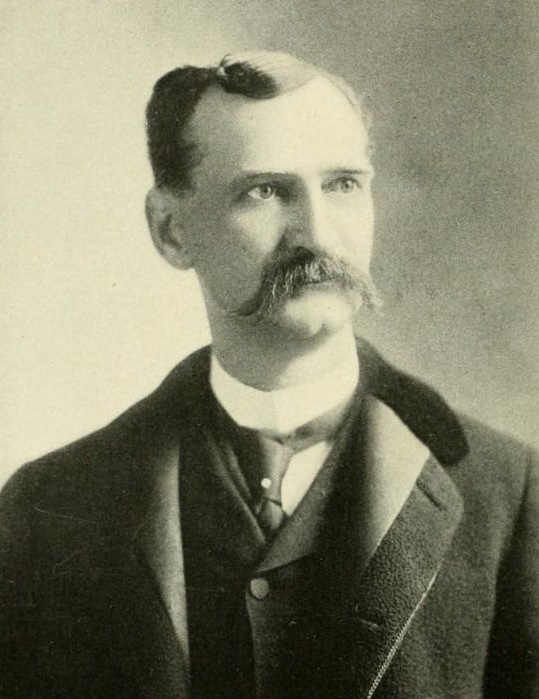

United States Senator from Mississippi
- In office May 31, 1898 – March 3, 1901
- Preceded by: Edward C. Walthall
- Succeeded by: Anselm J. McLaurin

Member of the U.S. House of Representatives from Mississippi's 2nd district
- In office March 4, 1897 – May 31, 1898
- Preceded by: John C. Kyle
- Succeeded by: Thomas Spight

Personal details
- Born: William Van Amberg Sullivan; December 18, 1857 Winona, Mississippi, U.S.
- Died: March 21, 1918 (aged 60) Oxford, Mississippi, U.S.
- Party: Democratic

William Van Amberg Sullivan (December 18, 1857 – March 21, 1918) was an American lawyer and politician who served as both a United States representative and a Senator from Mississippi around the turn of the 20th century.

== Biography ==
Born near Winona, Mississippi, he attended the common schools in Panola County and the University of Mississippi at Oxford, where he was a member of St. Anthony Hall.

He graduated from Vanderbilt University, in Nashville, Tennessee, in 1875, was admitted to the bar that year, and commenced practice in Austin. He moved to Oxford in 1877, was a member of the board of city aldermen.

=== Congress ===
He was elected as a Democrat to the Fifty-fifth Congress and served from March 4, 1897, to May 31, 1898, when he resigned, having been appointed Senator.

He was appointed and subsequently elected to the U.S. Senate to fill the vacancy caused by the death of Edward C. Walthall and served from May 31, 1898, to March 3, 1901; he was not a candidate for reelection.

=== Controversy ===
On September 8, 1908, Sullivan led a lynch mob which murdered a black man named Nelse Patton, who had been accused of killing a white woman. William Sullivan was quoted a day later as saying, "I led the mob which lynched Nelse Patton, and I'm proud of it. I directed every movement of the mob and I did everything I could to see that he was lynched."

=== Retirement and death ===
Sullivan retired from active business and resided in Washington, D.C. In 1918, he died in Oxford.

U.S. House of Representatives
Preceded by John C. Kyle	Member of the U.S. House of Representatives from Mississippi's 2nd congressional district 1897–1898	Succeeded by Thomas Spight
U.S. Senate
Preceded by Edward C. Walthall	U.S. senator (Class 1) from Mississippi; 1898–1901; Served alongside: Hernando D. Money	Succeeded by Anselm J. McLaurin
